= Aadhiya system =

Prostitution system in India

The aadhiya system, also sometimes spelled as adhiya, is a system, most prevalent in north-eastern, northern Bengali speaking parts of India (as the word is Bengali), where a sex worker is rented a room or apartment by a mashi or brothel keeper, usually an older retired sex worker, who charges the worker rent for the room based on her total earnings rather than at a fixed rate, so that the mashi gets a share of the worker's earnings.

== See also ==
- Dance bar
- Pornography in India
- Prostitution in India
- Prostitution in Pakistan
- Prostitution in colonial India
- Prostitution in Asia
- Prostitution by country
