= Pornography in Pakistan =

Pornography in Pakistan is subject to several legal provisions. The Government of Pakistan has placed ban on internet websites containing such material since November 2011. Major pornography website are already banned in Pakistan. In 2016, it was reported that government of Pakistan ordered Internet service providers in Pakistan to block more than 400,000 websites which contained pornographic content. Later in 2019, around 800,000 additional website containing pornographic content were banned by the Pakistan Telecommunication Authority on the order of the government.

== History ==
Until September 2011, Internet pornography was accessible and pornography was widely accessed with no policy towards censorship. Men often visited Internet cafes to pay for and watch pornography. However, in November 2011, the Pakistan Telecommunications Authority's (PTA) decided to start blocking pornographic websites.

In September 2011, a hacker claiming to be from Pakistan defaced the official website of the Supreme Court of Pakistan as a means to raise attention and call on the Chief Justice to permanently ban and block access to pornographic content on the Internet in the country. In October 2011, the website of the Pakistan Telecommunication Authority (PTA) was also defaced by the same hacker, with similar demands where the hacker demanded a blanket ban on all websites containing explicit material.

In November 2011, the PTA announced that it was in the process of banning the 1,000 most-frequented pornographic websites in Pakistan. The measure was taken to curb pornography. A report in 2012 said that, with many porn websites banned in the country, a few people were turning to purchasing pornographic DVDs in places such as Karachi's Rainbow Centre, which has long been the largest hub of video piracy and CD distribution in Pakistan.

== Child pornography ==
Child pornography is illegal in Pakistan. Culprits found involved in child pornography and child sexual abuse will be subject to 7 years in prison and a fine of US$7,000 as per the Pakistani laws. The punishment was later increased to 14 years to 20 years in prison and a fine of 1 million Pakistani rupees. Pakistan also has cyber unit to curb child pornography within the country. The unit has a team of 40 members and one director-level official, who will be independent to investigate the matter and the unit is integrated with the National Database and Registration Authority (NADRA) and Pakistan Telecommunication Authority (PTA).

Before introducing its own laws regarding the child pornography, Pakistan had ratified the Optional Protocol to the UNCRC on the Sale of Children, Child Prostitution and Child Pornography.

Federal Investigation Agency, cyber-crime chief has said, "Child pornography is a business . . with those involved in the crime linked to international child pornography rings." On 18 July 2019, around 2,384 websites containing child pornographic content were blocked by Pakistan Telecom Authority (PTA). Chairman of Pakistan Telecom Authorities, Aamir Azim Bajwa, stated that Pakistan was in touch with the Interpol to ban obscene material related to children. He said that the authorities did not find any evidence to suggest that these materials are being uploaded in Pakistan and people in Pakistan are viewing such content through VPN (virtual private network). The chairman further stated that PTA has blocked around 11,000 proxies and are working on methods to supervise VPN.

== Actions ==
The Pakistan Telecommunication Authority (PTA) reported in October 2024 that it had blocked over 844,000 pornographic websites as part of efforts to remove access to adult content and was working to monitor the use of virtual private networks (VPNs) to bypass such restrictions.

== See also ==
- Censorship in Pakistan
- Dance bar
- Internet censorship in Pakistan
- Internet in Pakistan
- Kasur child sexual abuse scandal
- Mujra
- Nautch
- Prostitution in colonial India
- Prostitution in Pakistan
- Tawaif
