= Heera Mandi =

Residential neighbourhood in District Lahore, Pakistan

Heera Mandi ہیرا منڈی Shahi Mohallah
- Neighbourhood
- Location within Lahore
- Coordinates: 31.586167101203753°N 74.30980680775039°E
- Country: Pakistan
- Province: Punjab
- City: Lahore
- Administrative town: Ravi
- Union council: 30 (Taxali Gate)

Heera Mandi, (Note: Urdu: ہیرامنڈی, lit. 'Diamond Market') sometimes referred to as Shahi Mohallah ("Royal Neighbourhood"), is a neighbourhood and bazaar located in the Walled City of Lahore.

It is specifically known as the red light district of Lahore, Pakistan. It is believed to have been originally named 'Heera Singh Di Mandi', meaning Heera Singh's food grain market. Later, this transformed to the modern name Heera Mandi as it evolved into a ‘red light district’ for the city.

Heera Mandi is located inside the Walled City of Lahore, near the Taxali Gate, and south of the Badshahi Mosque. Heeramandi, originally a song and dance community rooted in the 'tawaif' culture during the Mughal period, first evolved into a hotspot for prostitution during the Ahmad Shah Durrani (1747-1772) invasions of India. Following British colonization, Heera Mandi gradually transformed into a red-light district.

== Etymology ==
Heera Mandi translates literally to "diamond market". Heera Singh Dogra, a prime minister of the Punjab, during the reign of Maharaja Ranjit Singh thought that Shahi Mohalla in the heart of the city may be used as an economic hub, similar to a bazaar, in addition to housing tawaifs.

He established a food grains market in the neighborhood which first became known as ‘Heera Singh di Mandi’ (Heera Singh's market). Heera Singh's father Dhian Singh was the Prime Minister during Ranjit Singh's reign.

== Historical background ==
=== Mughal Empire ===
Established during the Mughal Empire in the 15th and 16th centuries, this place gained prominence during the reign of the third Mughal emperor, Akbar. During the Mughal period, women from Afghanistan and Uzbekistan were brought to Heera Mandi to entertain the royal court.

An area south of the Lahore Fort was developed as a residential neighborhood for attendants and servants of the royal court and the Emperor. It later came to be known as Shahi Mohalla, which translates to "royal neighborhood" in English. The area became home to tawaifs, who were professional entertainers associated with the royal court. The market remained the centre of the city's tawaif (courtesan) culture for the Lahore's Mughal era elite during the 15th, 16th and 17th centuries. The name "Heera Mandi" was chosen in honor of Heera Singh Dogra, an officer who resided in that area.

=== Durrani Empire ===
Following invasions by Ahmad Shah Abdali who is also called Ahmad Shah Durrani, Heera Mandi became known for prostitution. Abdali made it a Prostitution hub for his army.

=== Sikh Empire ===
Maharaja Ranjit Singh reinstated various Mughal royal rituals in Lahore, including the culture of tawaifs and their court performances, the tawaifs continued to receive royal patronage from the court. Brothels run by Afghans in Heeramandi were shut down.

=== British Empire ===
British colonial rule solidified Heera Mandi's reputation as a hub for prostitution. Within the market, women and hijras offered traditional and classical dances. From the British colonial period till recent past, it remained a centre of prostitution in Lahore. Many hijras, members of Pakistan's transgender community, frequent the area and are involved in the area's dance culture. After the British colonization, although more brothels and prostitutes were operating in Heera Mandi, there were still tawaif performing activities in the area, Heera Mandi retained its reputation as a centre of the performing arts. Tawaifs' patrons were no longer emperors and nobles but wealthy men from the city. This is when Heera Mandi earned its nickname “Bazaar-e-Husn” (Market of Beauty).

=== After the partition ===
After the partition of India in 1947, young and attractive tawaifs from Heera Mandi became the first choice of Pakistan filmmakers. Girls from the Heera Mandi joined the Lollywood industry and gained much fame and wealth. Some of the most skilled tawaifs performed as backup dancers in early Pakistani films. In Heera Mandi and surrounding areas, there were many dance and music classrooms, which closed as the tawaifs and musicians left. Eventually, only prostitutes came and stayed at Heera Mandi to engage in prostitution.

=== Culture ===
During the Mughal period, tawaifs of Heeramandi were trained in Indian classical music, Kathak and mujra dance, as well as poetry and etiquette. These tawaifs had art teachers or an Ustad to guide them in their skills. They would practice music and dance on the balcony. These tawaifs entertained guests with exquisite art in kotha and provided performing arts to their guests. Some of the tawaifs also entered the palace to perform for the Mughal royal family.

=== Prostitution ===
The brothel houses were further developed by the British in the old Anarkali Bazaar for the recreation and enjoyment of the British soldiers during the British Raj. After that, these were shifted to Lohari Gate and then to Taxali Gate.

The place is also considered as a symbol for the city of Lahore during the Mughal period. Over time, during the day, Heera Mandi is much like any other Pakistani bazaar and is known for its good food, wide range of Khussa (traditional Mughal footwear), and shops for musical instruments and dance. At night, the 'brothels above the shops' were opened. Sometimes the words 'Heera Mandi' themselves are considered to be offensive during informal conversations.

== Crackdown on prostitution ==
During Muhammad Zia-ul-Haq's reign, an operation was conducted against music and dance houses, which were alleged to be dens of prostitution. The operation served to spread the practice throughout the city instead of one limited area of the city.

After prostitution was outlawed in Heera Mandi, much of the area was converted into food streets, restaurants and retail shops. In recent times, there are prostitutes in the area who are selling sex secretly, the practice in the neighbourhood is in decline with the rise of 'reserving' prostitutes on online websites, though it's still illegal.

== Civic administration ==
The neighbourhood forms part of Taxali Gate's Union Council 30.

== In popular culture ==
- Lajwanti, a 2015 Indian TV series is partially set in Heera Mandi.
- Heera Mandi is referred to in the 2019 Indian film Kalank.
- The district serves as the basis for the 2024 Indian Netflix web-series Heeramandi: The Diamond Bazaar (2024).
- The 2024 Pakistani film Taxali Gate is partially set in Heera Mandi.

== See also ==
- Dance bar
- Mujra
- Nautch
- Tawaif
- Prostitution in colonial India
- Prostitution in Pakistan
- Prostitution in Afghanistan
- Bacha bazi
- Napier Road, Karachi
