= Chukri system =

System of forced prostitution in parts of India

The Chukri system is a debt bondage or forced labour system found in Kidderpore and other parts of West Bengal. Under this system, a woman can be coerced into prostitution in order to pay off debts. She generally works without pay for one year or longer in order to repay a supposed debt to the brothel owner for food, clothes, make-up, and living expenses.

The system creates a workforce of people virtually enslaved to their creditors, and constitutes one of the primary causes for women entering the sex trade. The system flourishes primarily in West Bengal or Calcutta. The name is used also in Bangladesh and the system also exists there.

== See also ==
- Dance bar
- Pornography in India
- Prostitution in India
- Prostitution in Bangladesh
- Prostitution in colonial India
- Prostitution in Asia
- Prostitution by country
