= Prostitution in Pakistan =

Legal status of prostitution across Asia. Decriminalization – No criminal penalties for prostitution Legalization -prostitution legal and regulated Abolitionism – prostitution is legal, but organized activities such as brothels and pimping are illegal; prostitution is not regulated Neo-abolitionism illegal to buy sex and for 3rd party involvement, legal to sell sex Prohibitionism – prostitution illegal Legality varies with local laws

Prostitution in Pakistan is a taboo culture of sex-trade that exists as an open secret but illegal. Prostitution is largely based in organisational setups like brothels or furthered by individual sex workers.

The sex trade is illegal in the country due to criminalization of extramarital sex. Pakistani prostitutes, thus, operate underground and in spite of the legal difficulties, prostitution in Pakistan is prevalent. In some areas of the country prostitution is strictly illegal and traditionally punishable by death, especially in the Khyber-Pakhtunkhwa and Balochistan regions.

Most analysts recognize poverty as a crucial factor in driving women towards prostitution. Both female and male prostitution have grown in operational yield in Pakistan over the years. With this increase in professional sex-trade in the country, non-governmental organisations are beginning to worry about issues like discrimination and AIDS. A 2017 UNAIDS report estimates that there are around 229,441 prostitutes in the country. In Khyber Pakhtunkhwa and Punjab, the graduate unemployment rate is elevated, indicating an oversupply of graduates in the face of labor markets that struggle to accommodate new graduates.

== History ==
The clan system in South Asia, involving various clans and sects, has always been a ground for segregated skill development. In the region, occupational clans evolved over time providing specific skills to the society through hereditary exclusion from others. Being a blacksmith, goldsmith, shoemaker, or gardener etc. thus became hereditary professions of specific communities. The "kanjar" an ethnic group in Pakistan believed to be associated with prostitution, were a nomadic people during the Mughal era who relied on herding, hunting, fishing and handicrafts. Over time, some of the Kanjar people began to work as entertainers, they are street entertainers. Kanjar women performed a dance called Chakri, while Kanjar men worked as musicians. Another group of Kanjar entertainers have settled in city; some perform as family units, while others run kotha businesses in the city. Kanjar girls who work in the arts in the city belong to the lower ranks of the tawaif. But some of them have risen to a higher status, calling themselves "kanchani," these are hereditary families of entertainers. Kanjar girls learn dance and music from a young age. The male Kanjar is called "kanjari," this class plays the Pakhawaj, the Rabab, and the Tala. Girls from Kanjar entertainer families seek out a wealthy patron. They establish a long-term, marriage like relationship through a ritual called "Nath Utrai", which is fundamentally different from prostitution in the conventional sense.

As some of the poorer members of the Kanjar tribe began to engage in prostitution and open brothels as a supplementary income, "kanjar" came to mean prostitute and "kanjari" came to mean pimp. The non-elite had a parallel system, that of brothels, which evolved much later when they no longer were controlled by the kings and nobility was loosened. It coincided with the growth of sea-trade where sailors became good clientele for the low-ranking prostitutes. During the British Raj, the earlier nobility was replaced by a new nobility composed of those who showed loyalty for the British. This new nobility was incapable of taking the role of patrons like earlier kings, and so the British provided much need patronage for the profession to grow and regulated the trade.

Prostitution was formalised for the first time in the South Asia by the British government in the mid-18th century. The British colonialists enacted special laws, created "red light" areas and assigned the task of protecting women sex workers to law-enforcing agencies. Municipalities overlooking the sex districts were given the responsibility of collecting taxes and providing health and sanitation services to the brothels.

After the creation of Pakistan in 1947, Pakistan inherited the historical red-light districts in Lahore and Multan including the infamous Hira Mandi area. These were well-developed and attracted both wealthy clients and those looking for singers and actresses. The prostitutes and associates in the sex-trade were named Kanjars. while their musician companions were known as the community of Mirasis. The prostitutes would usually, and still do, dance to the music of harmonium and tabla played by the mirasis. Where Lahore and Multan were the known contenders in the trade, other cities also had their own red-light districts which may include Ghulam abad and Aminpur bazar in Faisalabad Napier Road in Karachi and Qasai Gali in Rawalpindi. The prostitutes retained the hereditary character of their occupation and the social stigma.

During the rule of Muhammad Zia-ul-Haq, who tried to Islamise the nation, prostitution was viewed as an "evil" in society, and attempts were made to eradicate prostitution. Attempts were also made to curb music and dancing. The hours for performance of the dancing girls were reduced to two hours every evening. Police checkpoints were established in all entrances of red-light districts during the hours of rehearsing or practising music where the names of the visitors in red-light areas were recorded in police register, frightening the clients away.

== Female prostitution ==
Women involved in the practice of prostitution in Pakistan can be divided into three broad categories: women who have been trafficked or lured into the profession, women who have been born into the profession and women who willingly seek out a pimp to make extra money. Trafficked women are mainly found in the brothels, while those who willingly join this profession work as call girls, usually accompanied by a dalal or bharva or pimp. Those born into the profession are 'schooled' at home and operate under the management of their mother or another older female relative.

Prostitution, especially in brothels, often remains associated with human trafficking as trafficked women are sold into brothels. In 2003, approximately 20,000 minors were engaged in prostitution in Pakistan.

A recent study indicated that major cities like Karachi, Lahore, Faisalabad and Multan have large population of sex workers. A few cities have red-light districts, but due to illegal status of prostitution, many sex workers work in homes or hotels dispersed throughout urban areas and residential suburbs.

Cities like Karachi and Lahore are major base of operation for call-girls. In Karachi, many girls take on the occupation of call-girls independently; however most girls enter into prostitution after coming into contact with a pimp. The girls share 40%–50% of their income with the pimps. Some call girls work with the pimps under a fixed monthly amount, and the pimps provide police protection, shelter and bear daily expenses. Many call girls learn dance-forms like mujra to earn more money.

Affluent men in the nation may have a second or even a third wife, with whom they have had a semi-permanent sexual relationship in return for financial support, the husband acting as the wife's patron.They may not view the relationship in terms that of a client and a sex worker but as a loving relationship or as courtesan. The children born by these relationships are supported by their father.

== Male prostitution ==
Male and gay prostitution is increasing in Pakistan, though gay prostitution is not a recent phenomenon in the country. British explorer Richard Francis Burton, who visited the Sindh region long before the British conquest, documented a brothel of boy prostitutes in Karachi. Today many areas of large cities in the country have become virtual red-light districts for gay sex. Male prostitutes operate their business in every city and major town in Pakistan. Clients of male prostitutes come from every class, age group and profession. Homosexual men belonging to the upper and middle classes frequently pick up male prostitutes from video game shops, restaurants and cold-drinks spots. Young male prostitutes generally find customers in places like dark alleys, crowded bus stops, shopping centres, cinemas, hotel lobbies, parks, railway stations, hospitals, school compounds, elevators of public buildings etc. Sabzi Mandi, Lea Market, Landhi, Malir, and Lyari in Karachi are places visited by homosexuals from lower income groups. Clients in these areas primarily consist of bus drivers and conductors, night watchmen, labourers from upcountry, policemen, low-income government officials, small-time businesspersons etc.

Many male prostitutes offer services at hotel rooms booked for the purpose instead of the client's residence. This is because while accompanying a client to his residence prostitutes become vulnerable to assault or robbery. Some prostitutes have sex with clients in the back seat of the client's car. There are many part-time prostitutes who are students, salespersons, workers in hotels and garages. They become involved in the profession to earn extra money, and often to get a job in the film industry. Some involved in prostitution often manage to save enough money to go abroad in search of a job. Many boys are frequently used by the police without getting paid. Plainclothes police officers are often involved in the extortion and blackmail of male prostitutes.

Male prostitution has become common place in the Pakistani province of Khyber Pakhtunkhwa and has taken roots in the society as a norm and sign of financial muscle. Bacha bazi as it is known, where children especially young boys are dressed as women and forced to sing and dance in front of men, who later take them for sexual pleasure and pay the family.

== Foreign prostitutes in Pakistan ==
Many Filipino, Thai and Chinese women work in prostitution. They work in massage parlors. Many Filipino are employed as sex workers at various dens operating in Lahore and Islamabad. Afghan women are also trafficked to Pakistan for sexual exploitation. Thousands of Afghan girls and boys are trafficked into neighboring countries mostly Pakistan and sold into slavery each year.

== Law ==
Prostitution has no legal recognition in Pakistan. Moreover, despite growth of male prostitution and gay prostitution, homosexuality is outlawed in the nation. Under Section 377 of the Pakistan Penal Code, whoever voluntarily has "carnal intercourse against the order of nature with any man, woman or animal" shall be punished by 100 lashes and from 2 years to life imprisonment. While arrests are not common for homosexuality, the law is used as a tool to blackmail. Police frequently take money or sex from people they know to be involved in commercial or non-commercial homosexual relationship. Pakistani law is greatly influenced by the Penal Code drawn up by the British in 1892. This remains a major element of the current Pakistani law.

Section 371A and section 371B of the Pakistan Penal Code states:

371A. Selling person for purposes of prostitution, etc.– Whoever sells, lets to hire, or otherwise disposes of any person with intent that such person shall at any time be employed or used for the purpose of prostitution or illicit intercourse with any person or for any unlawful and immoral purpose, or knowing it to be likely that such person will at any time be employed or used for any such purpose, shall be punished with imprisonment which may extend to twenty-five years, and shall also be liable to fine.

Explanations.–(a) When a female is sold, let for hire, or otherwise disposed of to a prostitute or to any person who keeps or manages a brothel, the person so disposing of such female shall, until the contrary is proved, be presumed to have disposed of her with the intent that she shall be used for the purpose of prostitution. (b) For the purposes of this section and section 371B, "illicit intercourse" means sexual intercourse between persons not united by marriage.

371B. Buying person for purposes of prostitution, etc.–-Whoever buys, hires or otherwise obtains possession of any person with intent that such person shall at any time be employed or used for the purpose of prostitution or illicit intercourse with any person or for any unlawful and immoral purpose, or knowing it to be likely that such person will at any time be employed or used for any such purpose, shall be punished with imprisonment which may extend to twenty-five years, and shall also be liable to fine.

Explanation.–Any prostitute or any person keeping or managing a brothel, who buys, hires or otherwise obtains possession of a female shall, until the contrary is proved be presumed to have obtained possession of such female with the intent that she shall be used for the purpose of prostitution.

Sexual relations between two consenting adults was not a crime in Pakistan before 1979. Only the involvement of minors in prostitution was prohibited by law. Later the Zina Ordinance was enacted and extramarital sex became a criminal offence.

In the 1950s, "dancing-girls" were legitimized as "artists" in a High Court order. Thus they were permitted to perform for three hours in the evening. This is the only legal cover they have obtained till date. Other carnal activities, red-light districts and brothels remain illegal business and operate as an open secret let be by offering huge sums in bribe to the police. Many areas in Pakistan like Heera Mandi in Lahore and 12 No Chungi in Sargodha are govt licensed areas and police protect them due to some political reasons.

== Sex trafficking ==
According to the United States Department of State, Pakistan is a source, transit, and destination country for women and children subjected to sex trafficking. Children are bought, sold, rented, or kidnapped and placed in organized sex trafficking. NGOs report boys are subjected to sex trafficking around hotels, truck stops, bus stations, and shrines. Illegal labor agents charge high recruitment fees to parents in return for employing their children, some of whom are subjected to sex trafficking. Trafficking experts describe a structured system for exploiting women, girls, and LGBTI individuals in sex trafficking, including offering victims for sale in physical markets. Observers report police accept bribes to ignore prostitution in general, some of which may include sex trafficking. Women and girls are sold into forced marriages; in some cases, their new “husbands” force them into prostitution in Iran or Afghanistan. False job offers and high recruitment fees charged by illegal labor agents or sub-agents of licensed Pakistani overseas employment promoters entrap Pakistanis into sex trafficking. Women and girls from Afghanistan, China, Russia, Nepal, Iran, Bangladesh, Uzbekistan, and Azerbaijan are reportedly subjected to sex trafficking in Pakistan. Refugees from Afghanistan, Bangladesh, and Burma, including Rohingya, as well as religious and ethnic minorities such as Christians and Hazaras, are particularly vulnerable to trafficking in Pakistan.

The United States Department of State Office to Monitor and Combat Trafficking in Persons ranks Pakistan as a 'Tier 2' country.

== See also ==
- Dance bar
- Mujra
- Nautch
- Tawaif
- Prostitution in colonial India
- Pornography in Pakistan
