= British Indian (disambiguation) =

British Indians are Indians residing in Britain and British people of Indian descent.

British Indian or British Indians may also refer to:

- Nationals of British India, more commonly known by the demonym Indian people
- Of or relating to British India or the period of British rule in India
  - The British Indian Army
  - The British Indian Association, a political association in 19th and early 20th-century India
- The British Indian Ocean Territory, or people or other matters related thereto
- Britons in India, the British presence in India
  - Anglo-Indians, people of mixed British and Indian descent
