= Britons in India =

Ethnic group

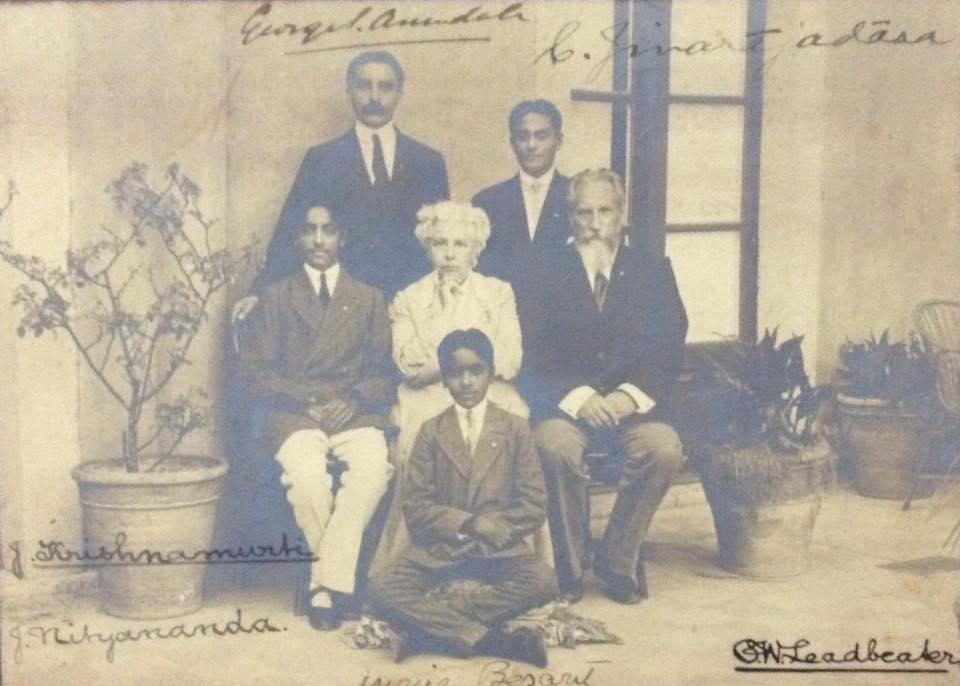
- Annie Besant shown with the Theosophists in Adyar, Madras in 1912

Total population
- 37,700

Languages
- English (British · Indian); Hindustani (Hindi · Urdu); Many other Indian languages

Religion
- Christianity (Protestant · Catholic)

Britons in India, though comprising only 37,700 British nationals in 2007, have had a significant impact due to the effects of British colonialism. Anglo-Indian was once used as a synonym for ethnic Britons in India, though nowadays refer more commonly to Indians of mixed British and Indian descent.

== History ==
=== Pre-colonial era ===
In the centuries before the "Second" British Empire, the motives of British individuals arriving in India generally centred around gaining wealth. One example of contemporary British views of India can be found in Shakespeare's writings, whose mentions of India paint a picture of a mysterious, wealthy land. The Indian perspective of European travelers was less flattering, as they were seen as "wondrous" yet "untrustworthy"; Emperor Akbar described them as an "assemblage of savages", and had considered trying to civilise them.

When the East India Company, formed in 1600, began to trade with Indians, its officials generally showed respect towards Indian society, though in some cases they may have suppressed their criticisms as a way of facilitating trade. Britons who went to India in this time period were apt to learn the local culture, as they were coming from a weaker polity and generally were only able to marry Indian women; British women were initially banned in Company settlements, being seen as distractions. British women started to come to India after the 1661 British acquisition of Bombay because of the need to populate the islands.

=== Colonial era ===
Two centuries of effort and achievement, lives given on a hundred fields, far more lives given and consumed in faithful and devoted service to the Indian people themselves. All this has earned us rights of our own in India.

— Winston Churchill (1931),

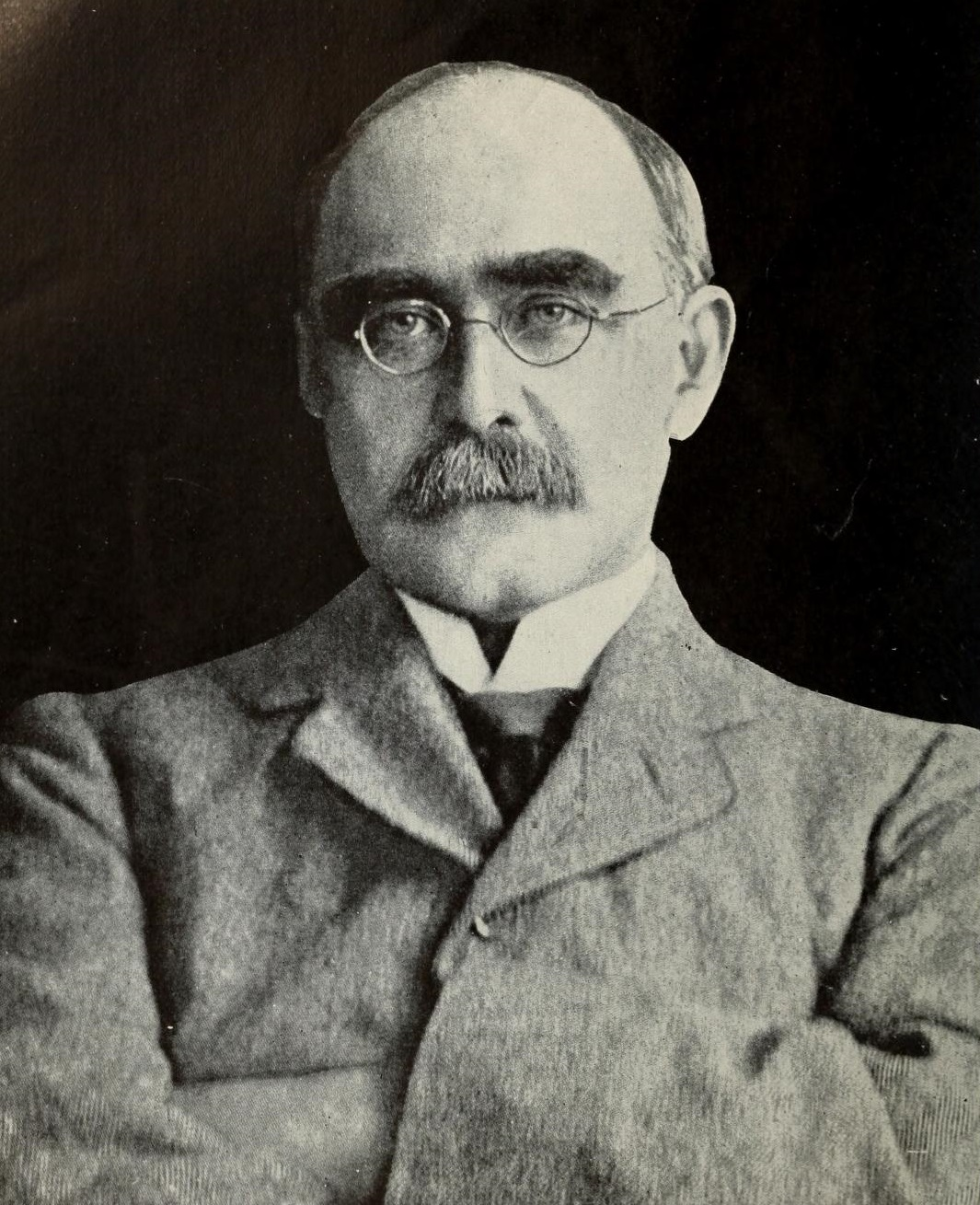
Author Rudyard Kipling

As the Company came to rise in Indian politics, a greater level of contemptuousness became apparent amongst Britons, and they came to isolate themselves to a substantial extent from the local population. The trauma of dominating a colonised population was a factor in pushing some British officials to isolate themselves from Indians' day-to-day life; the failed 1857 Rebellion also played a role in encouraging tensions and racism, as it increased fear of the locals. The rise of evangelicalism, encouraging negative views of non-Christian cultures, was another factor. However, children raised in India were fonder of the local culture, and even though they were generally sent to Britain to receive education, they often returned as adults.

The difficulty of travel to India, as well as poor health outcomes in the early colonial period, greatly challenged British visitors initially; after 1837, overland travel (after 1840, connecting to steam ships, and from the 1850s, involving newly built railways) to India was popularised, with stopovers in places such as Egypt gaining appeal. British women started to come in much greater numbers after the 1869 completion of the Suez Canal, which enabled a faster maritime journey between Britain and India; by then, British men's dalliances with the local "bibis" were seen as improper, and were being expunged from official records of earlier generations. British men still outnumbered the women to a substantial degree for the entire period up until India's independence though, with gender and racial identities having a role in determining hierarchies. Some men enjoyed the ability to unconstrainedly flex their masculinity in a foreign land, and British families in India stratified based on how white (non-Indian) they were and how frequently they were able to visit Britain.

By 1921, at the peak of the British Empire, 20,000 civil and military personnel had established themselves in India. The British related their exploits in India to those of classical empires; they saw themselves as inheriting the Greco-Roman heritage (see Alexander's Indian campaign), and compared their efforts in civilising India to those of the Romans in ancient Britain. On the whole, they did not seek to settle on a permanent basis or to own land; as late as the 1860s, there were even arguments against opening up the sale of "waste" land, because it might encourage excessive European immigration.

=== Contemporary era ===
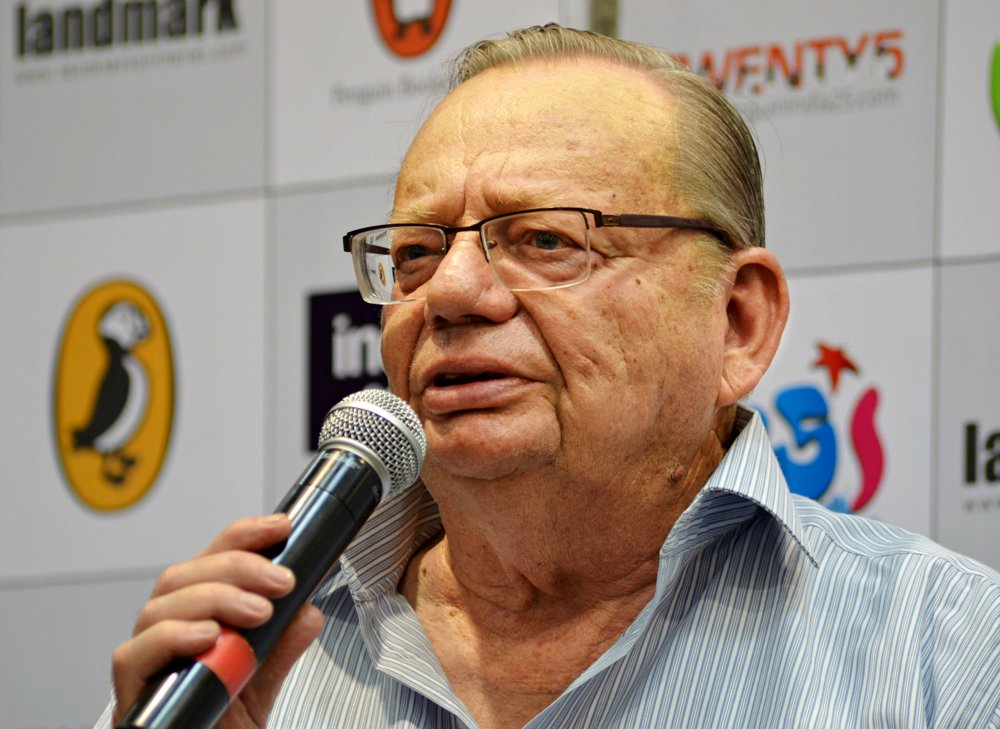
Ruskin Bond

India's 1947 independence from British rule saw the departure of British troops; the last regiment left in February 1948. British-run firms also had rapidly lost ground in the Indian economy from World War I onwards.

== Impact ==
=== Cuisine ===
Food played a role in how the British adapted to the local climate; a variety of "sick food" guides were available. To counter the high rate of death to tropical disease, Britons used the medicinal quinine; however, to mask its taste, they would mix it with soda and sugar, giving rise to "tonic water", a natural complement to gin.

=== Music ===
Western forms of music first came to India during British rule, with certain American forms of music such as jazz also becoming established by the 20th century with some British involvement.

=== Prostitution ===
A steady influx of British troops into India was vital in setting up of organised prostitution in India, which persisted even after independence.

=== Sport ===
The interaction between local beliefs and Western sporting practices sometimes manifested itself in anti-sport ways; for example, the initial introduction of football at one Srinagar school, designed to produce physical fitness among the children, had to take place by force because the schoolboys saw contact with the leather ball as defiling them, and similar sentiments of avoiding defilement led to Brahmins preferring cricket because it didn't involve physical contact with lower castes. An American observer later commented that the British physical education regime also appeared to be meant to produce a "race of subservient people" through its emphasis on elements such as military drills.

One of the world's earliest football clubs, the Mohun Bagan was established in 1889. The club was formed when The Football Association of England began making standard rules for football before FIFA, the international governing body of football was founded.

== See also ==
- India–United Kingdom relations
- Indians in the United Kingdom
- Britons in Pakistan
- Nabob
