= Showgirls of Pakistan =

2020 Pakistani documentary film

- Directed by: Saad Khan
- Written by: Saad Khan
- Produced by: Saad Khan; Anam Abbas
- Cinematography: Anam Abbas
- Edited by: Saad Khan; Joey Chriqui
- Release date: 2020
- Running time: 106 minutes

Showgirls of Pakistan is a 2020 documentary film by Lahore-born filmmaker Saad Khan, about the commercial Mujra industry of Pakistan.

== Background ==
Mujra is a dance form that emerged during the Mughal empire, practiced by courtesans for the elite classes of Northern India. The documentary explores the prejudice, censorship, and misogynistic climate in which Mujra dancers work in modern-day Punjab, Pakistan.

== Music ==
The soundtrack of the film is composed of old melodies of Lollywood films from the 1960s and 1970s.

== Synopsis ==
Showgirls of Pakistan revolves around the lives of three performers, Afreen Khan, Uzma Khan, and Reema Jaan. Afreen's story follows her dancing in Lahore's public theaters. She dances on a dangerous platform where performers are beaten, harassed, kidnapped, or shot. Uzma performs in rural private parties and dance bars in Dubai. Finally, veteran dancer Reema, a transgender woman or khawaja sira, had a promising dancing career on stage but now struggles to find work.

== Reception ==
The film was premiered in the IDFA Competition 2020. It was selected by VICE for its non-fiction collection The Short List, the film is also available on their YouTube channel.

The film was positively reviewed by Foreign Policy, Dawn, Mint, and Business Doc Europe.

== Controversy ==
Nick Fraser of BBC termed the documentary "Pak porn" during 17th Annual Hot Docs Forum. The director Saad Khan responded as "Nick saying it’s ‘Pak porn’ and slut shaming the women in the film is the same thing as my Dad going to those shows and then calling them whores". Guy Lavie, channel manager for Israel's yesDocu and Brianna Little, development executive with Amazon Studios applauded the film, Brianna called the film "Incredible". Michael Kronish of Vice Canada called the film "a natural fit” for Vice.

Showgirls of Pakistan won $10,000 Corus-Hot Docs Forum pitch prize during the 2016 Hot Docs Forum.
