= Prostitution in India =

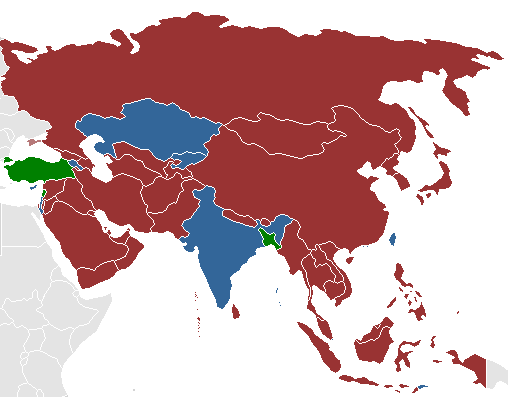
Legal status of prostitution across Asia. Prostitution legal and regulated Prostitution (the exchange of sex for money) legal, but organized activities such as brothels and pimping are illegal; prostitution is not regulated Prostitution illegal No data

Prostitution is legal in India, but a number of related activities including soliciting, kerb crawling, owning or managing a brothel, prostitution in a hotel, child prostitution, pimping and pandering are illegal. There are, however, many brothels illegally operating in Indian cities including Mumbai, Delhi, Kolkata, Pune, and Nagpur, among others. UNAIDS estimate there were 657,829 prostitutes in the country as of 2016. Other unofficial estimates have calculated India has roughly 3 million prostitutes. India is widely regarded as having one of the world's largest commercial sex industry. It has emerged as a global hub of sex tourism, attracting sex tourists from wealthy countries. The sex industry in India is a multi-billion dollar one, and one of the fastest growing. Sex workers face poor conditions and structural barriers.

== History ==
A tawaif was a courtesan who catered to the nobility of India, particularly during the Mughal era. The tawaifs excelled in and contributed to music, dance (mujra), theatre, and the Urdu literary tradition, and were considered an authority on etiquette. Tawaifs were largely a North Indian institution central to Mughal court culture from the 16th century onwards and became even more prominent with the weakening of Mughal rule in the mid-18th century. They contributed significantly to the continuation of traditional dance and music forms and then the emergence of modern Indian cinema.

Goa was a colony in Portuguese India set up in the early 16th century, and this Portuguese stronghold contained a community of Portuguese slaves. During the late 16th and 17th centuries the Portuguese trade in Japanese slaves resulted in traders from the Portuguese Empire and their captive lascar crew members from South Asia bringing Japanese slaves to Goa. These were usually young Japanese women and girls brought or captured from Japan as sexual slaves.

The culture of the performing art of nautch, an alluring style of popular dance, rose to prominence during the later period of the Mughal Empire and the rule of the British East India Company. During the period of Company rule (and after the Indian Rebellion of 1857, the direct administration of the British Crown), British colonial officials established and maintained brothels across the Indian subcontinent. The prostitutes who worked in such brothels were recruited from rural Indian families and paid directly by the British authorities. The red-light districts of cities such as Mumbai developed at this time. The governments of many Indian princely states had regulated sex work in India prior to the 1860s. The British Raj enacted the Cantonment Act of 1864 to regulate prostitution in colonial India as a matter of accepting a necessary evil. The Cantonment Acts regulated and structured prostitution in the British military bases which provided for about twelve to fifteen Indian women kept in brothels called chaklas for each British regiment stationed in India. They were licensed by military officials and were allowed to consort with soldiers only. In the late 19th and early 20th centuries, women and girls from Eastern Europe and Japan were trafficked into British India, where they worked as prostitutes, servicing British colonists and soldiers, since sexual relations between white men and native women was increasingly opposed by colonial authorities. Japanese prostitutes (the Karayuki-san) serviced British colonists in British India where they were viewed as clean.

From time immemorial Indian poets have sung praises of the 'public woman', the professional entertainer. The epics give us a colourful description of her intimate connection with royal splendour. The Puranas highlight her auspicious presence as a symbol of good luck. Buddhist literature also testifies to the high esteem in which she was held in society. She appears through the ages in different incarnations from apsara in divine form to ganika, devdasi, nartika [ordinary dancer], kanchani, tawaif and the nautch girl.

— Pran Nevile

== Operations and modus operandi ==
Prostitution in India manifests in various forms. The most notable instances where sex workers offer their services may include situations where these services are accessible under different disguises:

- Brothels: Buildings in which prostitutes are available.
- Streetwalkers/Street prostitution: Prostitutes who stand or walk in the streets, roads, highways or public spaces to get customers.
- Call girls: Prostitutes with whom an appointment can be made by telephone, usually to meet at the client's address.
- Escort agencies: An agency where people, especially young women, may be hired to accompany someone for entertainment, etc.
- Private residences: The place, especially the house, in which a person lives or resides.
- Massage & spa parlors: A place where people go and pay for a massage.
- Hotels: A commercial establishment offering lodging facilities.
- Nightclubs and bars: A place of entertainment open at night usually serving food and liquor and providing music and space for dancing and often having a floor show.
- Virtual sex, Cybersex and Phone sex services on online and on digital platforms: Online/phone-based sex-oriented conversations and exchanges through audio, images, video or texts.
- Devadasi, temple dancers devoted to the practice of spiritual dancing but are forced into sex work.

== Organisation ==
Government organisations like MDACS (Maharashtra District AIDS Control Society) have played a very prominent role in generating awareness on HIV/AIDS, through the assistance in providing free literature and organising street campaigns. There are several NGOs that work to prevent the spread of STI/STDs in the community. NACO (National AIDS Control Organisation), a government agency leads these NGOs. The Durbar Mahila Sumanwua Committee is a sex-workers' union based in Sonagachi, Kolkata, which has 65,000 members. They advocate for labour rights for sex workers, and they also fight against trafficking.

=== Prevalence ===
There were an estimated two million female sex workers in the country in 1997. In 2007, the Ministry of Women and Child Development reported the presence of over 3 million female sex workers in India, with 35.47 percent of them entering the trade before the age of 18 years. The number of prostitutes rose by 50% between 1997 and 2004.

=== Underage prostitution ===
Surveys show there are an estimated 1.2 million children involved in prostitution.

=== Research ===
Much new knowledge on sex work in India came from the first major survey, in April 2011. This was performed by the Centre for Advocacy on Stigma and Marginalisation (CASAM), which is part of SANGRAM, a major NGO that deals with sex workers.

== Red-light districts of India ==
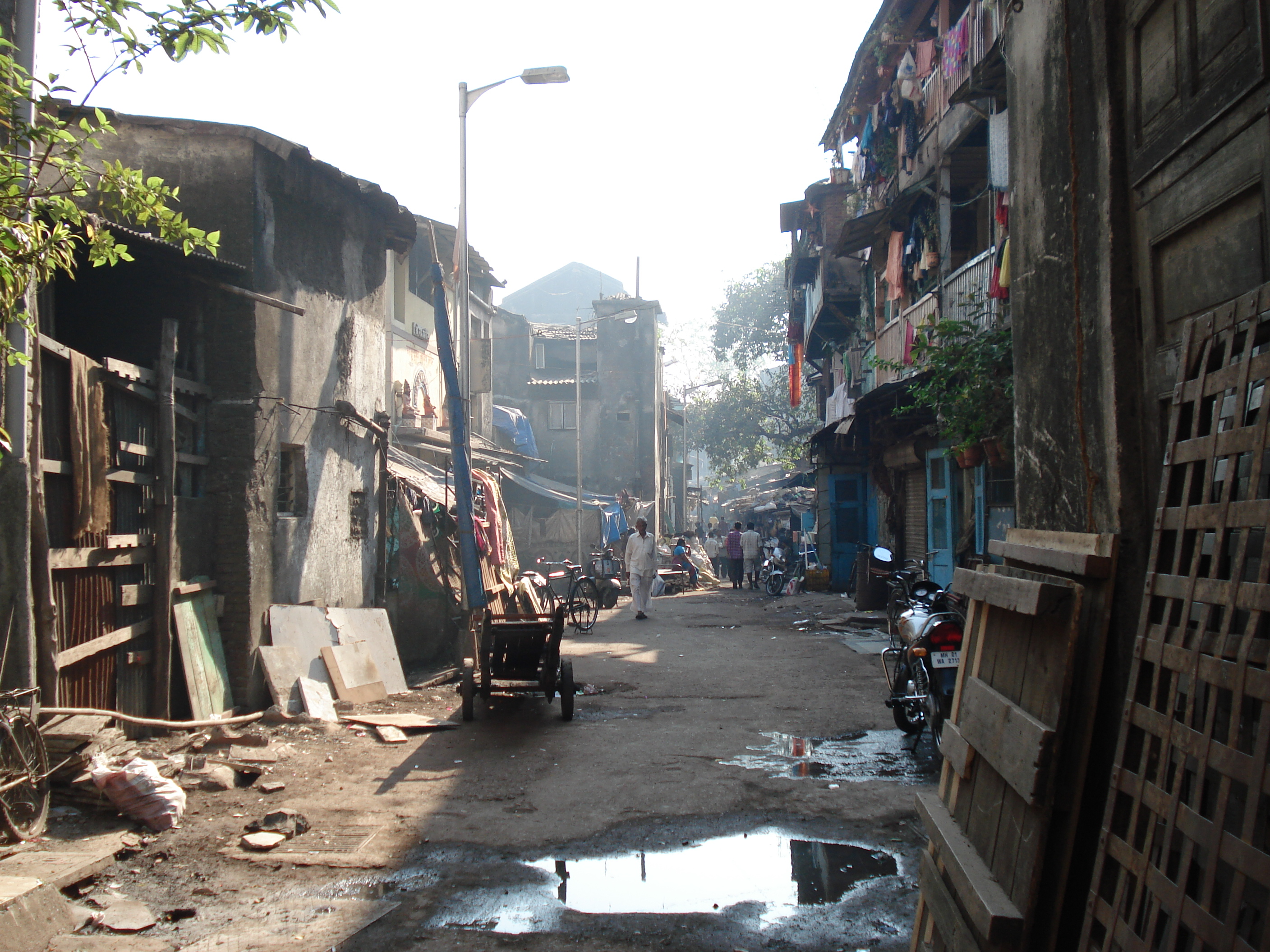
A lane in Kamathipura, a red light district in Mumbai.

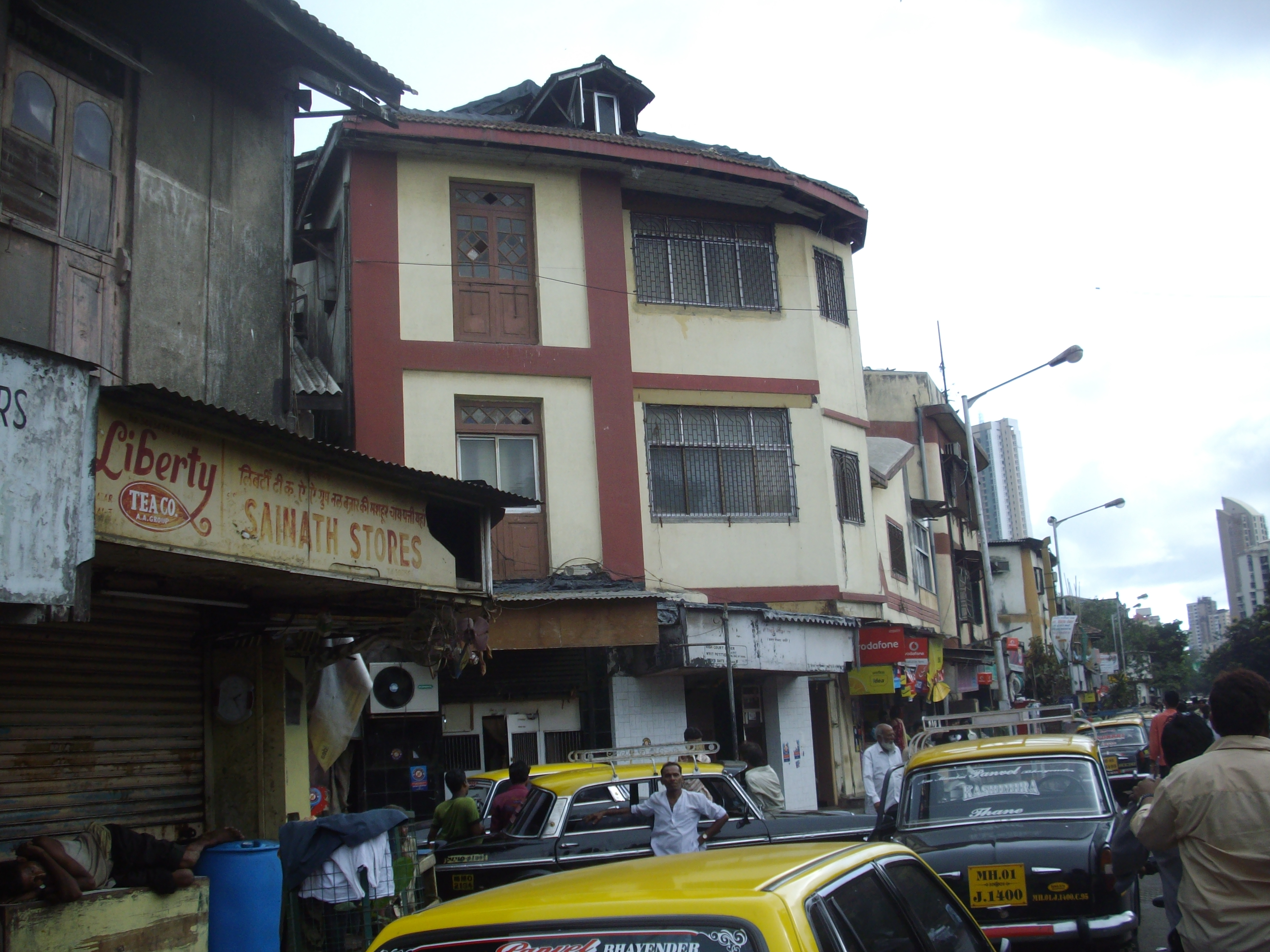
A brothel in Kamathipura

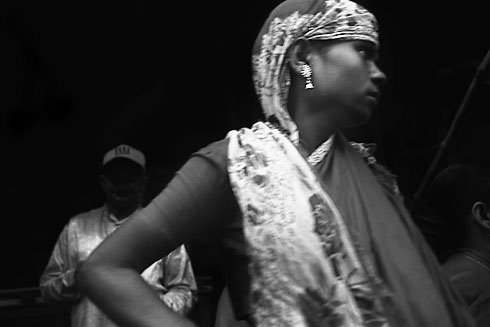
A scene in Sonagachi, Kolkata's red light district, 2005.

India's largest and best-known red-light districts are:

- Sonagachi, Kolkata: Asia's largest red-light district with around 10,000 to 16,000 female sex workers. According to a 2019 study by the Indian Journal of Public Health reported that West Bengal had the highest number of female sex workers (FSWs) in India, contributing nearly 25% of the country's total estimated 1.82 million FSWs. This suggests that around 455,000 FSWs were in West Bengal at that time. During her January 2014 visit to Kolkata, Gloria Steinem toured Sonagachi accompanied by members of the anti-trafficking organisation Apne Aap Women Worldwide.
- Kamathipura, Mumbai: Second largest red-light district in India with approximately 5,000 sex workers.
- Budhwar Peth, Pune: India's third largest red-light district with home to around 5,000 sex workers and 700 brothels.
- Chaturbhuj Sthan, Muzaffarpur: A red-light district in Bihar with around 3,500 sex workers.
- Shivdaspur, Uttar Pradesh: A town in Varanasi district with a red-light district housing approximately 2,000 sex workers.
- G. B. Road, New Delhi: A red-light district in the Indian capital with many brothels and over 1,000 sex workers.
- Ganga Jamuna, Nagpur: A red-light district with as many as 188 brothels and thousands of sex workers.
- Reshampura, Gwalior: A red-light district in Madhya Pradesh.
- Kabari Bazar, Meerut: A red-light district with hundreds of sex workers operating from around 75 brothels.
- Meergunj, Prayagraj: A red-light district with a significant number of sex workers infamous for illicit trafficking and forced prostitution.

The operation of brothels is officially prohibited (de jure), yet in practice, these establishments are confined to specific areas within urban locales. Despite the lack of official sanction for brothels, minimal efforts are exerted to eradicate or impede its existence. The living conditions within these establishments are notably substandard, marked by dilapidated infrastructure, insufficient lighting, malodorous environments, uncleanliness, and an overall lack of sanitation. Notably, the prevalence of sexually transmitted diseases, including HIV/AIDS, is exceptionally high in these establishments and the services provided within these brothels are usually available at a notably cheap price. The environment in the brothels, particularly in the surrounding alleys, is deemed hazardous, especially during the night, with reports of various other forms of criminal activities.

== Legal status ==
The law is vague on prostitution itself. The primary law dealing with the status of sex workers is the 1956 law referred to as The Immoral Traffic (Suppression) Act (ITSA). According to this law, prostitutes can practise their trade privately but cannot legally solicit customers in public. A BBC article, however, mentions that prostitution is illegal in India; the Indian law does not refer to the practice of selling one's own sexual service as "prostitution". Clients can be punished for sexual activity in proximity to a public place. Organised prostitution (brothels, prostitution rings, pimping, etc.) is illegal. As long as it is done individually and voluntarily, a woman (male prostitution is not recognised in any law in India) can use her body in exchange for material benefit. In particular, the law forbids a sex worker to carry on her profession within 200 yards of a public place. Unlike as is the case with other professions, sex workers are not protected under normal labour laws, but they possess the right to rescue and rehabilitation if they desire, and they possess all the rights of other citizens.

In practice ITSA is not commonly used. The Indian Penal Code (IPC) which predates the ITSA is often used to charge sex workers with vague crimes such as "public indecency" or being a "public nuisance" without explicitly defining what these consist of. In 1986 the old law was amended as the Immoral Traffic (Prevention) Act or ITPA. Attempts to amend this to criminalise clients have been opposed by the Health Ministry, and has encountered considerable opposition. In a positive development in the improvement of the lives of female sex workers in Calcutta, a state-owned insurance company has provided life insurance to 250 individuals.

Over the years, India saw a growing mandate to legalise prostitution, to avoid exploitation of sex workers and their children by middlemen and in the wake of a growing HIV/AIDS menace.

Supreme Court of India; on 19 May 2022, upheld that everyone, including sex workers are guaranteed the right to dignity and life under Article 21 of Constitution of India. Thus, sex workers can not be harassed and arrested legally. Brothel related practices still remain illegal.

=== Immoral Traffic (Prevention) Act ===
The Immoral Traffic (Prevention) Act, or ITPA, also called the Prevention of Immoral Trafficking Act (PITA), is a 1986 amendment of legislation passed in 1956 as a result of the signing by India of the United Nations' declaration in 1950 in New York on the suppression of human trafficking. The act, then called the All India Suppression of Immoral Traffic Act (SITA), was amended to the current law. The laws were intended as a means of limiting and eventually abolishing prostitution in India by gradually criminalising various aspects of sex work. The main points of the PITA are as follows:

- Sex workers: A prostitute who seduces or solicits shall be prosecuted. Similarly, call girls can not publish phone numbers to the public (imprisonment up to six months with fine, point 8). Sex workers are also punished for prostitution near any public place or notified area (imprisonment of up to three months with fine, point 7).
- Clients: A client is guilty of consorting with prostitutes and can be charged if he engages in sex acts with a sex worker within 200 yards of a public place or "notified area" (imprisonment of up to 3 months, point 7). The client may also be punished if the sex worker is below 18 years of age (from 7 to 10 years of imprisonment, no matter the age of the minor, point 7).
- Pimps: Pimps or live-in lovers who live off a prostitute's earnings are guilty of a crime. Any adult male living with a prostitute is assumed to be guilty unless he can prove otherwise (imprisonment of up to 2 years with fine, point 4).
- Brothels: Landlords and brothel-keepers can be prosecuted, maintaining a brothel is illegal (from 1 to 3 years' imprisonment with fine for first offence, point 3). Detaining someone at a brothel for the purpose of sexual exploitation can lead to prosecution (imprisonment of more than 7 years, point 6). Prostitution in a hotel is also a criminal offence.
- Procuring and trafficking: A person who procures or attempts to procure anybody is liable to be punished. A person who moves a person from one place to another (human trafficking) can be prosecuted similarly (7 years' imprisonment with fine for first conviction, and up to life imprisonment thereafter, point 5B).
- Rescued women: The government is legally obligated to provide rescue and rehabilitation in a "protective home" for any sex worker requesting assistance (point 21).

A "public place" in context of this law includes places of public religious worship, educational institutions, hostels, hospitals etc. A "notified area" is a place which is declared to be "prostitution-free" by the state government under the PITA. "Brothel" in context of this law, is a place which has two or more sex workers (2a). Prostitution itself is not an offence under this law, but soliciting, brothels, madams and pimps are illegal.

=== Political and legal debates ===
In 2006 the Ministry of Women and Child Development put forward a bill aimed at reducing human trafficking. The bill proposed criminalising the clients of trafficked prostitutes. However, it stalled during the legislative process, and legislation against human trafficking was subsequently effected by amendments to the Indian Penal Code.

Clauses in the ITPA relating to living off the earnings of a sex-worker are being challenged in court, together with criminalisation of brothels, prostitution around a notified public place, soliciting and the power given to a magistrate to evict sex-workers from their home and forbidding their re-entry. Other groups are lobbying parliament for amendments to the law.

In 2009 the Supreme Court ruled that prostitution should be legalised and convened a panel to consider amending the law. In 2011 the Supreme Court held that "right to live with dignity" is a Constitutional right and issued an order relating to "creating conditions conducive for sex workers to work with dignity". The court directed the Central Government, States and Union Territories to carry out a survey to determine the number of sex workers in the country willing to be rehabilitated.

However, in 2012 the Central Government made a plea to the Supreme Court arguing that sex workers should not be allowed to pursue their trade under the constitutional "right to live with dignity". Government counsel contended that any such endorsement by the court would be ultra vires of ITPA, which totally bans prostitution. Opposing counsel submitted that the Act only prohibited brothel activities and punitive action against pimps. The Supreme Court agreed to examine the plea.

Feminist debates over prostitution in India have included disagreements over whether prostitution should be understood primarily as a form of gendered violence and exploitation or whether sex workers should be recognised as workers with rights and agency. Indian sex workers’ rights activists have challenged abolitionist feminist approaches, arguing for the empowerment of sex workers and greater recognition of their rights.

== Reasons for entry ==
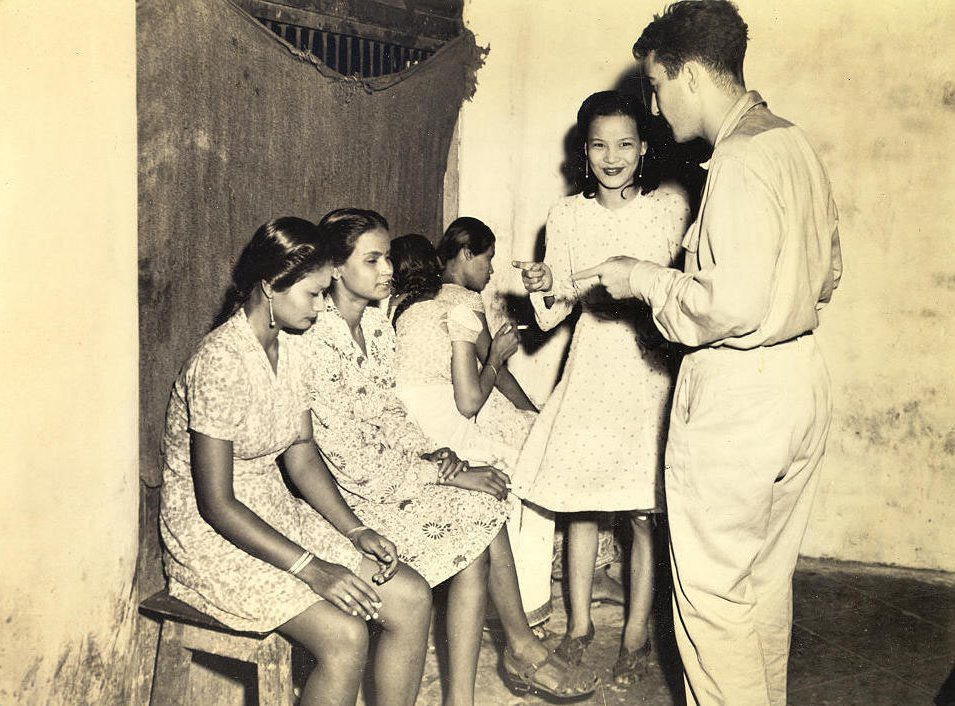
An American GI and prostitutes in Calcutta in 1945

Most of the research done by the development organisation Sanlaap indicates that the majority of sex workers in India work as prostitutes due to lacking resources to support themselves or their children. Most do not choose this profession but out of necessity, often after the breakup of a marriage or after being disowned and thrown out of their homes by their families. The children of sex workers are much more likely to get involved in this kind of work as well. A survey completed in 1988 by the All Bengal Women's Union interviewed a random sample of 160 sex workers in Calcutta: Of those, 23 claimed that they had come of their own accord, whereas the remaining 137 women claimed to have been introduced into the sex trade by agents. The breakdown was as follows:

- Neighbour in connivance with parents: 7
- Neighbours as pimps (guardians not knowing): 19
- Aged sex workers from same village or locality: 31
- Unknown person/accidental meeting with pimp: 32
- Mother/sister/near relative in the profession: 18
- Lover giving false hope of marriage or job and selling to brothel: 14
- Close acquaintance giving false hope of marriage or job: 11
- "Husband" (not legally married): 3
- Husband (legally married): 1
- Young college student selling to brothel and visiting free of cost: 1

The breakdown of the agents by sex were as follows: 76% of the agents were female and 24% were males. Over 80% of the agents bring young women into the profession were known people and not traffickers: neighbours, relatives, etc.

Also prevalent in parts of Bengal is the Chukri System, whereby a female is coerced into prostitution to pay off debts, as a form of bonded labour. In this system, the prostitute generally works without pay for one year or longer to repay a supposed debt to the brothel owner for food, clothes, make-up and living expenses. In India, the Government's "central sponsored scheme" provides financial or in-kind grants to released bonded labourers and their family members, the report noted, adding over 2,850,000 people have benefited to date. Almost 5,000 prosecutions have been recorded so far under the Bonded Labour System (Abolition) Act of 1976.

Some women and girls are by tradition born into prostitution to support the family. The Bachara Tribe, for example, follow this tradition with eldest daughters often expected to be prostitutes.

Over 40% of 484 prostituted girls rescued during major raids of brothels in Mumbai in 1996 were from Nepal. In India one estimate calculated that as many as 200,000 Nepalese girls, many under the age of 14, were sold into sexual slavery during the 1990s.

== Sex worker health ==
Sex workers in India find it difficult to access health care and face discrimination, especially in government hospitals, based on their profession, such as being forced to take tests for sexually transmitted infection when they are ill, being refused to be admitted to hospitals without HIV tests, being refused to conduct physical examination before prescribing medication. Surveys have found that sex workers prefer private health care providers over the government ones where they have some kind of sensitisation training. Difficulty in accessing health care is due to factors such as hospitals sending women to their husband for approval to get abortion, financial hurdles such as high fees for abortion and difficulty procuring identification documents as many sex workers live unstable lives, having trouble providing a proof of address. A Supreme Court verdict in 2021 directed that sex workers be provided Aadhaar and ration without asking for proof of address, which made the situation better for sex workers. In government hospitals, sometimes it is not even doctors who do abortions for sex workers, but ward boys will do. Sex workers also lack privacy in hospitals because people think they are okay with anybody looking at their private parts. Transgender sex workers face even more discrimination than women sex workers due to doctors' lack of knowledge of transgender bodies, hospitals not having separate queues for trans people and hospitals not assigning them doctors but rather rush them to testing centres.

Mumbai and Kolkata (Calcutta) have the country's largest brothel based sex industry, with over 100,000 sex workers in Mumbai. It is estimated that HIV among prostitutes have largely fallen, in last decade.

A positive outcome of a prevention programme among prostitutes can be found in Sonagachi, a red-light district in Kolkata. The education programme targeted about 5,000 female prostitutes. A team of two peer workers carried out outreach activities including education, condom promotion and follow-up of STI cases. When the project was launched in 1992, 27% of sex workers reported condom use. By 1995 this had risen to 82%, and in 2001 it was 86%.

Reaching women who are working in brothels has proven to be quite difficult due to the sheltered and secluded nature of the work, where pimps, Mashis, and brothel-keepers often control access to the women and prevent their access to education, resulting in a low to modest literacy rate for many sex workers.

Not only HIV but other infection diseases have been decreased, examined data from 868 prevention projects—serving about 500,000 female sex workers—implemented between 1995 and 2008. The research found that reaching sex workers through prevention programs decreased HIV and syphilis infection rates among young pregnant women tested routinely at government prenatal health clinics.

== Foreign prostitutes ==
Women and girls from Azerbaijan, Russia, Uzbekistan, Philippines Arab countries, Japan, the former Soviet Republics and Bangladesh, from other origins have been noted as working as prostitutes in India.

In 2015, ten Thai women were arrested in India on prostitution charges for allegedly running two brothels masquerading as massage parlours.

In 2013 there were reports of Afghan women being trafficked as prostitutes to India.

Uzbek women go to India to work as prostitutes.

== Sex trafficking ==
India is a source, destination, and transit country for women and children subjected to sex trafficking. Most of India's trafficking problem is internal, and those from the most disadvantaged social strata—economically, members of tribal communities—are most vulnerable. Thousands of unregulated work placement agencies reportedly lure adults and children under false promises of employment into sex trafficking.

Experts estimate millions of women and children are victims of sex trafficking in India. Traffickers use false promises of employment or arrange sham marriages within India or Gulf states and subject women and girls to sex trafficking. In addition to traditional red light districts, women and children increasingly endure sex trafficking in small hotels, vehicles, huts, and private residences. Traffickers increasingly use websites, mobile apps, and online money transfers to facilitate commercial sex. Children continue to be subjected to sex trafficking in religious pilgrimage centers and by foreign travelers in tourist destinations.

Many women and girls, predominately from Nepal and Bangladesh, and from Central Asia, Africa, and Asia, including Rohingya and other minority populations from Burma, are subjected to sex trafficking in India. Prime destinations for both Indian and foreign female trafficking victims include Kolkata, Mumbai, Delhi, Gujarat, Hyderabad, and along the India-Nepal border; Nepali women and girls are increasingly subjected to sex trafficking in Assam, and other cities such as Nagpur and Pune. Some corrupt law enforcement officers protect suspected traffickers and brothel owners from law enforcement efforts, take bribes from sex trafficking establishments and sexual services from victims, and tip off sex traffickers to impede rescue efforts. Some Nepali, Bangladeshi, Afghan, and Pakistani women and girls are subjected to both labor and sex trafficking in major Indian cities. Following the 2015 Nepal earthquakes, Nepali women who transit through India are increasingly subjected to trafficking in the Middle East and Africa.

The United States Department of State Office to Monitor and Combat Trafficking in Persons ranks India as a 'Tier 2' country.

== Popular culture ==
Prostitution has been a theme in Indian literature and arts for centuries. Mrichakatika, a ten-act Sanskrit play, was written by Śhudraka in the 2nd century BC, and tells the story of a famous courtesan, Vasantsena. It was made into Utsav, a 1984 Hindi film. Amrapali (Ambapali), the legendary nagarvadhu, or royal courtesan of the Kingdom of Vaishali, famously became an enlightened Buddhist monk later in her life - a story retold in a Hindi film, Amrapali (1966).

The tawaif, or elite courtesan in the Mughal era, has been a theme of a number of films, including Pakeezah (1972), Umrao Jaan (1981), Tawaif (1985), Kama Sutra: A Tale of Love (1996) and Umrao Jaan (2006). Other movies depicting lives of prostitutes and dancing girls are Sharaabi (1984), Ram Teri Ganga Maili (1985), Amar Prem (1972), Mausam (1975), Mandi (1983), Devdas (2002), Chandni Bar (2001), Chameli (2003), Laaga Chunari Mein Daag, Sadak (2007), Dev D (2009), B.A. Pass (2013), Thira (2013), Begum Jaan (2017) and Gangubai Kathiawadi (2022).

Various fictional films have featured the subject of prostitution in India, including Slumdog Millionaire (2008), Chaarfutiya Chhokare (2014), Manoranjan (1974), Soothradharan (2001), Calcutta News (2008), Lakshmi (2014), Love Sonia (2018), Gangubai Kathiawadi (2022) among others.

Born into Brothels, a 2004 American documentary film about the children of prostitutes in Sonagachi, Kolkata, won the Academy Award for Documentary Feature in 2004.

Delhi-based woman film maker Shohini Ghosh made a documentary film "Tales of the Night Fairies" in 2002, interviewing five sex workers who are activists of the DMSC sex-worker union in Kolkata. DMSC fights against trafficking and advocates for labour rights for sex-workers.

== See also ==
- Dance bar (India)
- Prostitution in Bangladesh
- Prostitution by country
- Prostitution in Asia
- Prostitution in the Americas
- Prostitution in Europe
- Pornography in India
- Prostitution in Kolkata
- Prostitution in Thailand

== Bibliography ==
- Banerji, Sures Chandra (1989). The Castaway of Indian Society: History of Prostitution in India Since Vedic Times, Based on Sanskrit, Pāli, Prākrit, and Bengali Sources. Calcutta: Punthi Pustak. ISBN 978-81-85094-25-0.
- Beck, Sanderson (2004). India & Southeast Asia to 1875. World Peace Communications. ISBN 978-0-9762210-0-5.
- Cunningham, S.; Shah, M. (2016). The Oxford Handbook of the Economics of Prostitution. Oxford handbooks. Oxford University Press. ISBN 978-0-199-91524-8. LCCN 2016008321.
- D'Cunha, J. (1991). The Legalization of Prostitution: A Sociological Inquiry Into the Laws Relating to Prostitution in India and the West. Wordmakers for the Christian Institute for the Study of Religion and Society. ISBN 978-8-185-44701-8. LCCN lc91907832.
- Gathia, Joseph Anthony; Centre of Concern for Child Labour (1999). Child Prostitution in India. Concept Publishing Company. ISBN 978-81-7022-771-7.
- Gomare et al. 2002. Adopting strategic approach for reaching out to inaccessible population viz Abstract WePeF6707F abstract, The XIV International AIDS Conference.
- Grjebine, Loïs (1987). Reporting on Prostitution: The Media, Women, and Prostitution in India, Malaysia, and the Philippines. UNESCO.
- Kole, Subir K. (2009). "From "Veshyas" to "Entertainment Workers": Evolving Discourses of Bodies, Rights, and Prostitution in India". Asian Politics & Policy. 1 (2): 255–281. doi:10.1111/j.1943-0787.2009.01115.x.
- Lakkimsetti, C. (2020). Legalizing Sex: Sexual Minorities, AIDS, and Citizenship in India. New York University Press. ISBN 978-1-479-85223-9.
- Legg, S. (2014). Prostitution and the Ends of Empire: Scale, Governmentalities, and Interwar India. Duke University Press. ISBN 978-0-822-37617-0.
- Lund-Thomsen, Peter; Riisgaard, Lone; Singh, Sukhpal; Ghori, Shakil; Coe, Neil M. (2021). "Global Value Chains and Intermediaries in Multi-stakeholder Initiatives in Pakistan and India". Development and Change. 52 (3): 504–532. doi:10.1111/dech.12647. hdl:10398/00bada88-a961-47fe-97d4-3b1f25e10383. ISSN 1467-7660. S2CID 234851831.
- Mitra, D. (2020). Indian Sex Life: Sexuality and the Colonial Origins of Modern Social Thought. Princeton University Press. ISBN 978-0-691-19634-3. LCCN 2019016737.
- Mukherji, Santosh Kumar (1986). Prostitution in India. New Delhi: Inter-India Publications. ISBN 978-81-210-0054-3.
- Murthy, L.; Seshu, M.S. (2014). The Business of Sex. Zubaan. ISBN 978-9-383-07459-4.
- Nag, M. (2006). Sex Workers of India: Diversity in Practice of Prostitution and Ways of Life. Allied Publishers Private. ISBN 978-8-184-24018-4.
- Nair, P. M.; Sen, Sankar (2005). Trafficking in Women and Children in India. Orient Blackswan. ISBN 978-81-250-2845-1.
- Nanda, B.; Ray, N. (2018). Discourse on Rights in India: Debates and Dilemmas. Taylor & Francis. ISBN 978-0-429-82714-3.
- Rehman, M.U.; Singh, D. (2020). Laws and Regulations Vis-A-VIS Prostitution in India. Eliva Press. ISBN 978-1-952-75153-0.
- Rozario, M. Rita (2000). Broken Lives: Dalit Women and Girls in Prostitution in India. Tumkur, Karnataka, India: Ambedkar Resource Centre, Rural Education for Development Society. ISBN 978-81-87367-02-4.
- Sahni, R.; Shankar, V.K.; Apte, H. (2008). Prostitution and Beyond: An Analysis of Sex Workers in India. SAGE Publications. ISBN 978-0-761-93638-1. LCCN 2008023613.
- Sithannan, V. (2014). Immoral Traffic - Prostitution in India. eBooks2go. ISBN 978-1-618-13023-5.
- Singh, P.K. (2004). Brothel Prostitution in India. University Book House. ISBN 978-8-181-98026-7. LCCN 2004312822.
- Sinha, S. N.; Basu, Nripendra Kumer (1933). History of Prostitution in India. Bengal Social Hygiene Association.
- Soofi, Mayank Austen (2013). Nobody Can Love You More: Life in Delhi's Red Light District. Penguin Group. ISBN 978-0-670-08414-2.
- Shah, Svati P. (1 December 2013). "Brothels and Big Screen Rescues". Interventions. 15 (4): 549–566. doi:10.1080/1369801X.2013.849425. ISSN 1369-801X. S2CID 142882920.
- Tambe, A. (2019). Defining Girlhood in India: A Transnational History of Sexual Maturity Laws. University of Illinois Press. ISBN 978-0-252-05158-6. LCCN 2019025066.
- Vijayakumar, G. (2021). At Risk: Indian Sexual Politics and the Global AIDS Crisis. Globalization in Everyday Life. Stanford University Press. ISBN 978-1-503-62806-9. LCCN 2020050234.
- Wright, Andrea (2018). "'The Immoral Traffic in Women': Regulating Indian Emigration to the Persian Gulf". In Ferdoush, Md Azmeary; Jones, Reece (eds.). Borders and Mobility in South Asia and Beyond. Amsterdam University Press. pp. 145–166. doi:10.2307/j.ctv513ckq.10. ISBN 978-90-485-3522-4. S2CID 244538097.
- Global Perspectives on Prostitution and Sex Trafficking: Africa, Asia, Middle East, and Oceania. Lexington Books. 2011. ISBN 978-0-739-13277-7. LCCN 2010043820.
- Sinha, Sunny; Prasad, Indulata (2021). "Examining hopes, aspirations, and future plans of women in non-brothel-based sex work in Kolkata, India". Culture, Health & Sexuality. 23 (7): 913–926. doi:10.1080/13691058.2020.1740793. PMID 32452748. S2CID 218892328.
- Vijayakumar, Gowri; Panchanadeswaran, Subadra; Chacko, Shubha (2019). "Sex Work, Marginalization, and Activism in India". Archives of Sexual Behavior. 48 (7): 1969–1972. doi:10.1007/s10508-018-1384-3. PMID 30617663. S2CID 58569951.
- Navani-Vazirani, Sonia; Solomon, Davidson; Gopalakrishnan; Heylen, Elsa; Srikrishnan, Aylur Kailasom; Vasudevan, Canjeevaram K.; Ekstrand, Maria L. (2015). "Mobile phones and sex work in South India: The emerging role of mobile phones in condom use by female sex workers in two Indian states". Culture, Health & Sexuality. 17 (2): 252–265. doi:10.1080/13691058.2014.960002. PMC 4425944. PMID 25301669.
- Silverman, J. G.; Raj, A.; Cheng, D. M.; Decker, M. R.; Coleman, S.; Bridden, C.; Pardeshi, M.; Saggurti, N.; Samet, J. H. (2011). "Sex Trafficking and Initiation-Related Violence, Alcohol Use, and HIV Risk Among HIV-Infected Female Sex Workers in Mumbai, India". Journal of Infectious Diseases. 204 (Suppl 5): S1229–S1234. doi:10.1093/infdis/jir540. PMC 3247788. PMID 22043037.
- Buzdugan, Raluca; Halli, Shiva S.; Cowan, Frances M. (2009). "The female sex work typology in India in the context of HIV/AIDS". Tropical Medicine & International Health. 14 (6): 673–687. doi:10.1111/j.1365-3156.2009.02278.x. PMID 19392742. S2CID 29286294.
- Swendeman, Dallas; Fehrenbacher, Anne E.; Ali, Samira; George, Sheba; Mindry, Deborah; Collins, Mallory; Ghose, Toorjo; Dey, Bharati (2015). ""Whatever I Have, I Have Made by Coming into this Profession": The Intersection of Resources, Agency, and Achievements in Pathways to Sex Work in Kolkata, India". Archives of Sexual Behavior. 44 (4): 1011–1023. doi:10.1007/s10508-014-0404-1. PMC 4382371. PMID 25583373.
- Platt, Lucy; Grenfell, Pippa; Meiksin, Rebecca; Elmes, Jocelyn; Sherman, Susan G.; Sanders, Teela; Mwangi, Peninah; Crago, Anna-Louise (2018). "Associations between sex work laws and sex workers' health: A systematic review and meta-analysis of quantitative and qualitative studies". PLOS Medicine. 15 (12) e1002680. doi:10.1371/journal.pmed.1002680. PMC 6289426. PMID 30532209.
- McClarty, Leigh M.; Bhattacharjee, Parinita; Blanchard, James F.; Lorway, Robert R.; Ramanaik, Satyanarayana; Mishra, Sharmistha; Isac, Shajy; Ramesh, B.M.; Washington, Reynold; Moses, Stephen; Becker, Marissa L. (2014). "Circumstances, experiences and processes surrounding women's entry into sex work in India". Culture, Health & Sexuality. 16 (2): 149–163. doi:10.1080/13691058.2013.845692. PMID 24236895. S2CID 45216575.
- Vejella, Shanti; Patel, Sangram Kishor; Saggurti, Niranjan; Prabhakar, Parimi (2016). "Community Collectivization and Consistent Condom Use Among Female Sex Workers in Southern India: Evidence from Two Rounds of Behavioral Tracking Surveys". AIDS and Behavior. 20 (4): 776–787. doi:10.1007/s10461-015-1171-2. PMC 4799261. PMID 26286343.
- Javalkar, Prakash; Platt, Lucy; Prakash, Ravi; Beattie, Tara S.; Collumbien, Martine; Gafos, Mitzy; Ramanaik, Satyanarayana; Davey, Calum; Jewkes, Rachel; Watts, Charlotte; Bhattacharjee, Parinita; Thalinja, Raghavendra; Dl, Kavitha; Isac, Shajy; Heise, Lori (2019). "Effectiveness of a multilevel intervention to reduce violence and increase condom use in intimate partnerships among female sex workers: Cluster randomised controlled trial in Karnataka, India". BMJ Global Health. 4 (6) e001546. doi:10.1136/bmjgh-2019-001546. PMC 6861099. PMID 31798984.
- Suryawanshi, Dipak; Bhatnagar, Tarun; Deshpande, Sucheta; Zhou, Weiwei; Singh, Pankaj; Collumbien, Martine (2013). "Diversity among Clients of Female Sex Workers in India: Comparing Risk Profiles and Intervention Impact by Site of Solicitation. Implications for the Vulnerability of Less Visible Female Sex Workers". PLOS ONE. 8 (9) e73470. Bibcode:2013PLoSO...873470S. doi:10.1371/journal.pone.0073470. PMC 3759393. PMID 24023877..
- Alexander, Mallika; Mainkar, Mandar; Deshpande, Sucheta; Chidrawar, Shweta; Sane, Suvarna; Mehendale, Sanjay (2014). "Heterosexual Anal Sex among Female Sex Workers in High HIV Prevalence States of India: Need for Comprehensive Intervention". PLOS ONE. 9 (2) e88858. Bibcode:2014PLoSO...988858A. doi:10.1371/journal.pone.0088858. PMC 3930672. PMID 24586416.
- Joffres, Christine; Mills, Edward; Joffres, Michel; Khanna, Tinku; Walia, Harleen; Grund, Darrin (2008). "Sexual slavery without borders: Trafficking for commercial sexual exploitation in India". International Journal for Equity in Health. 7 22. doi:10.1186/1475-9276-7-22. PMC 2569945. PMID 18817576.
- Magar, Veronica (2012). "Rescue and Rehabilitation: A Critical Analysis of Sex Workers' Antitrafficking Response in India". Signs: Journal of Women in Culture and Society. 37 (3): 619–644. doi:10.1086/662698. S2CID 146640028.
- Mahapatra, Bidhubhusan; Walia, Monika; Patel, Sangram Kishor; Battala, Madhusudana; Mukherjee, Saradiya; Patel, Prachi; Subramanium, Balakrishnan; Atmavilas, Yamini; Saggurti, Niranjan (2020). "Sustaining consistent condom use among female sex workers by addressing their vulnerabilities and strengthening community-led organizations in India". PLOS ONE. 15 (7) e0235094. Bibcode:2020PLoSO..1535094M. doi:10.1371/journal.pone.0235094. PMC 7329078. PMID 32609731.
- Lazarus, Lisa; Reza-Paul, Sushena; Rahman, Syed Hafeez Ur; Ramaiah, Manjula; Venugopal, M.S.; Venukumar, K.T.; Moses, Stephen; Becker, Marissa; Lorway, Robert (2021). "Beyond remedicalisation: A community-led PrEP demonstration project among sex workers in India". Culture, Health & Sexuality. 23 (9): 1255–1269. doi:10.1080/13691058.2020.1774656. PMID 32672518. S2CID 220586230.
- Legg, Stephen (2009). "Governing prostitution in colonial Delhi: From cantonment regulations to international hygiene (1864–1939)" (PDF). Social History. 34 (4): 447–467. doi:10.1080/03071020903257018. JSTOR 25677306. S2CID 145288117.
- Ghose, Toorjo; Swendeman, Dallas T.; George, Sheba M. (2011). "The Role of Brothels in Reducing HIV Risk in Sonagachi, India". Qualitative Health Research. 21 (5): 587–600. doi:10.1177/1049732310395328. PMID 21266706. S2CID 13898677.
- Mahapatra, Bidhubhusan; Bhattacharya, Ruchira; Atmavilas, Yamini; Saggurti, Niranjan (2018). "Measuring vulnerability among female sex workers in India using a multidimensional framework". PLOS ONE. 13 (9) e0204055. Bibcode:2018PLoSO..1304055M. doi:10.1371/journal.pone.0204055. PMC 6155505. PMID 30252879.
- Fehrenbacher, Anne E.; Chowdhury, Debasish; Jana, Smarajit; Ray, Protim; Dey, Bharati; Ghose, Toorjo; Swendeman, Dallas (2018). "Consistent Condom Use by Married and Cohabiting Female Sex Workers in India: Investigating Relational Norms with Commercial Versus Intimate Partners". AIDS and Behavior. 22 (12): 4034–4047. doi:10.1007/s10461-018-2219-x. PMC 6330243. PMID 30006793.
- Brady, David; Biradavolu, Monica; Blankenship, Kim M. (2015). "Brokers and the Earnings of Female Sex Workers in India". American Sociological Review. 80 (6): 1123–1149. doi:10.1177/0003122415609051. hdl:10419/190199. JSTOR 24756411. S2CID 146576721.
- Kotiswaran, Prabha (2008). "Born Unto Brothels: Toward a Legal Ethnography of Sex Work in an Indian Red-Light Area". Law & Social Inquiry. 33 (3): 579–629. doi:10.1111/j.1747-4469.2008.00116.x. JSTOR 20108776. S2CID 62832706.
- Gangoli, Geetanjali (2006). "Prostitution in India". International approaches to prostitution (1st ed.). Bristol University Press. pp. 115–140. doi:10.2307/j.ctt9qgxs0.10. ISBN 978-1-84742-158-6. JSTOR j.ctt9qgxs0.10.
- Levine, Philippa (1994). "Venereal Disease, Prostitution, and the Politics of Empire: The Case of British India". Journal of the History of Sexuality. 4 (4): 579–602. JSTOR 4617154. PMID 11639269.
- Bhattacharji, Sukumari (1987). "Prostitution in Ancient India". Social Scientist. 15 (2): 32–61. doi:10.2307/3520437. JSTOR 3520437.
- Banerjee, Sumanta (1993). "The 'Beshya' and the 'Babu': Prostitute and Her Clientele in 19th Century Bengal". Economic and Political Weekly. 28 (45): 2461–2472. JSTOR 4400383.
- George, Annie; Vindhya, U.; Ray, Sawmya (2010). "Sex Trafficking and Sex Work: Definitions, Debates and Dynamics — A Review of Literature". Economic and Political Weekly. 45 (17): 64–73. JSTOR 25664387.
- Bandyopadhyay, Aparna (2014). "Chronicles of Love, Betrayal and Prostitution in Late Colonial Bengal". Proceedings of the Indian History Congress. 75: 723–728. JSTOR 44158453.
- Nag, Moni (2001). "Anthropological Perspectives on Prostitution and AIDS in India". Economic and Political Weekly. 36 (42): 4025–4030. JSTOR 4411265.
- Sinha, Murli M. (1999). "Sex, Structural Violence, and AIDS: Case Studies of Indian Prostitutes". Women's Studies Quarterly. 27 (1/2): 65–72. JSTOR 40003399.
- Misra, Geetanjali; Mahal, Ajay; Shah, Rima (2000). "Protecting the Rights of Sex Workers: The Indian Experience". Health and Human Rights. 5 (1): 88–115. doi:10.2307/4065224. JSTOR 4065224. PMID 11154525.
- Legg, Stephen (2012). "Stimulation, Segregation and Scandal: Geographies of Prostitution Regulation in British India, between Registration (1888) and Suppression (1923)". Modern Asian Studies. 46 (6): 1459–1505. doi:10.1017/S0026749X11000503. JSTOR 41683035. S2CID 145166694.
