= Prostitution in colonial India =

The practice of prostitution in colonial India was influenced by the policies of British rule in India. During the 19th and 20th centuries the colonial government facilitated, regulated and allowed the existence of prostitution. Not only was prostitution in India affected by the policy of the Governor General of India, it was also influenced by the moral and political beliefs of the British authorities, and conflicts and tensions between the British authorities and the Indian populace at large. The colonial government had a profound effect on prostitution in India, both legislatively and socially.

By the mid-19th century, the existence of large numbers of indigenous prostitutes in British military cantonments was indicative of the widespread prevalence of state-sanctioned prostitution in colonial India. The colonial administration enacted new laws aimed at restricting prostitution as a practice reserved exclusively for British military personnel, and making it a permitted part of the military apparatus.

By the end of the 19th century, colonial governance of the sex trade had evolved from restricted intercommunal mobility to legislative and biopolitical mechanisms of disease prevention within British military cantonments. Colonial Cantonment acts, starting with the 1864 Cantonment Act, structured and regulated prostitution on British military bases, providing for registration and mandatory medical examinations for women serving British soldiers.

== Cantonment Act of 1864 ==
Although the governments of many Indian princely states had regulated prostitution prior to the 1860s, such regulation in British India was first ushered in by the Cantonment Act of 1864. The Cantonment Acts regulated and structured prostitution in the British military bases. The structuring features of the Cantonment Acts provided for about twelve to fifteen Indian women for each regiment of British soldiers. Each regiment contained about a thousand soldiers. These women were kept in brothels called chaklas. They were licensed by military officials and were allowed to consort with soldiers only. Most of the women came from poor families and had no other opportunities for social or economic independence. The structural inequalities that pushed women into prostitution were often enforced by the colonial governments.

Furthermore, the Cantonment Act of 1864 provided for the establishment and extension of hospitals in cantonments. Women working in chaklas were often required to undergo medical examinations once a week, in order to examine them for traces of venereal diseases. Prostitutes were often confined against their wills in these prison hospitals, especially if they were found to have a venereal disease. The Cantonment Act of 1864, originally meant for military bases, was eventually extended to the Presidencies and Provinces of British India. However, when British military personnel were increasingly struck down by venereal diseases, more regulations were demanded. This eventually led to the Indian Contagious Disease Acts.

== Cantonment Act of 1895 ==
As the practice of prostitution increasingly became a source of contention between Indians and the British, another Cantonment Act was enacted. This Act of 1895 explicitly outlawed any licensing or official approval of prostitution in cantonments. This was seen as a strong measure to prevent the spread of venereal disease, and most of the military was opposed to the Act. The Cantonment Acts serve as examples of only some of the tension over prostitution in colonial India.

== Contagious Disease Acts ==
Between 1864 and 1869 many parts of British India, including the British military cantonments, were subjected to the Contagious Disease Acts. These Acts originated in Great Britain itself and were then introduced in British India and other British possessions. The Indian Contagious Disease Acts were similar in content, but wider in scope than the domestic Contagious Disease Acts. These Acts were meant as a response to the growing number of cases of venereal disease amongst the British military. Historical records indicate that one in three reported Army illnesses were venereal diseases. The British saw the need for regulation of prostitution to protect their military men, and the issue of venereal diseases had become one of concern for the Quartermaster General of India, Sir Edward Chapman. The Contagious Disease Acts sought to prevent venereal diseases in military personnel through several regulations. The Acts required the registration of women engaged in prostitution. These women were often required to carry a license in the form of a card. Furthermore, it mandated the regular medical examination of female prostitutes. If any of these women were found to be infected during an examination, they were required to undergo in-patient treatment. If they refused such treatment, they could be penalized by imprisonment. Once cured of their diseases, they were released. None of these measures were applied to infected men. The Acts only targeted female prostitutes, as they were the only people subject to licensing and medical examinations.

=== Opposition to Contagious Diseases Acts ===
From the time the Contagious Disease Acts had been enacted, they were controversial. There was a growing Abolitionism movement that sought to end state-regulated prostitution. Some of this opposition came from the prominent feminist Josephine Butler. Feminists saw prostitutes as an obstacle to equality in society, and therefore sought to end state-sanctioned prostitution. Other Abolitionists viewed state sanctioned prostitution as morally offensive and harmful. In 1869, groups were formed in opposition to the Contagious Disease Acts, which included the National Association for the Repeal of the Contagious Diseases Act and the Ladies National Association for the Repeal of the Contagious Diseases Acts. These repeal efforts proved to be successful in 1883, when the Acts were suspended. The next year they were completely repealed.

== Immigration of foreign prostitutes ==
In the early 20th century, Eastern European prostitutes were visible in the major cities and seaports of British India, where the colonial authorities had become increasingly opposed to sexual contact between British men and Indian women. As seaports became more prominent in India, more European sailors travelled to India leading to an increase in the demand for sexual services of women, and more European women immigrated to work as prostitutes. British authorities tolerated the immigration of European prostitutes in the hope that British men would engage in sex with them, instead of Indian women.

Although, state-regulated prostitution was seen as a necessity to satisfy sailors and soldiers, European prostitutes constituted another racial crisis for the British authorities, giving rise to fears about sexual intercourse between "native" males and white prostitutes. They perceived this type of sexual interaction as undermining to colonial hierarchies based on class and race. They were even more anxious about the possibility of production of mixed-race children from such unions, as it threatened European racial purity. However, there were fewer concerns about unions between white males and Indian females, although they too could and did produce children.

Generally, Indian women were not seen as violated or as victims when they engaged in prostitution with British men. Stephen Edwardes, police commissioner of Bombay from 1909 to 1917, noted that brothels of European women were accepted so that British men did not have to engage in sexual relations with Indian women. Growing social disapproval of sexual relations with Indian women compelled the authorities to accept prostitution as a necessary evil.

In most cases, European prostitutes were considered "poor whites" or "low Europeans", indicating their perceived low socio-economic class. Evidence shows that many of the trafficked women, as well as their traffickers, were Jewish. References to these women as "low Europeans" or "less white" were often based in anti-Semitism. Terms such as "less white" denote an overall view that somehow these women were less valuable. The League of Nations was also compelled to take action. Growing pressures forced the British imperial authorities to react. Ultimately, the British in India would bow down to the strains caused by the First World War and the abolitionist movements. Brothels would only remain lawful in British India until the 1930s.

== Religious clashes ==
The British were proactive in state legislation . But cultural misunderstandings contributed to how and to what extent practices regarded as prostitution by the British were regulated. One misunderstanding was British perception of Devadasis. These women, who were dedicated to Hindu temples for serving classical dance & music, maintained sexual relations with men of high social status. They were usually non-monogamous sexual relations with a variety of social elites. This offended the traditional British conceptions of marriage and Victorian moral conduct. The sexual nature of the Devadasi occupation was widely condemned by most Britons. Therefore, British officials focused on the sexual roles of the Devadasis and encouraged laws against them. The British viewed the traditional Hindu practice of devoting certain young women to the temple as the exploitation of a minor for the purposes of prostitution, and from the 1860s onwards convictions for "temple harlotry" became increasingly common. The clash between British and Hindu culture became increasingly apparent as the British legislators enforced more laws against Devadasi practices. Eventually, the Indian Penal Code included the Devadasi practice as a punishable offense.

Although British moral sensibilities were no doubt disturbed by the sexual practices of Devadasis, they were also unaccustomed to the traditional rights Devadasis enjoyed. Under Hindu Law, Devadasis were granted property and inheritance rights, often unheard of by women. Although certain forms of prostitution were permitted by the British, they eventually profiled Devadasis as an illegitimate form of prostitution.

== Justification for prostitution ==
The British authorities offered several justifications for the British regulation of prostitution in colonial British India. One justification of such state regulation of prostitution was the notion that prostitution was a vital safeguard against homosexuality. Specifically, access to prostitutes was necessary to protect British military men from engaging in homosexual behaviour and other "unnatural" acts. Therefore, military administrators approved of brothels in cantonments. One 1917 committee report by the Government of India claimed that homosexuality would invariably take hold if men were denied access to women. This apparent fear of homosexuality had colonial roots. Many European colonialists viewed homosexuality as perverse, "un-British" behaviour, whereas they often believed that same-sex practices were "natural" to other "inferior" peoples, such as Indians, Arabs, and Africans.

The British preserved and regulated prostitution through mandatory licensing and medical examinations, not out of concern for prostitutes, but out of concern for their own military men.

== View of Christian missionaries ==
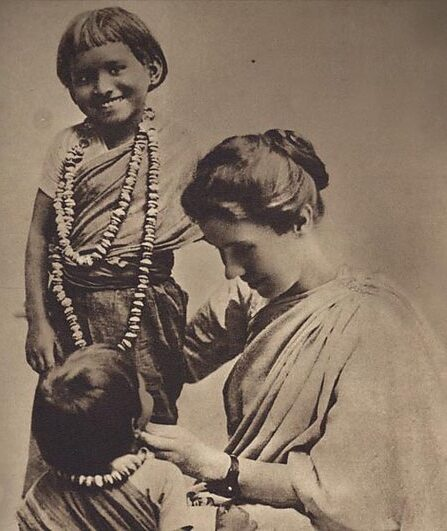
Amy Carmichael, a Protestant missionary, focused her efforts in the Indian Empire on rescuing children from prostitution.

Christian missionaries opposed the practice of prostitution in the British Empire. They also fought against the practice of child temple prostitution. Amy Carmichael, a Protestant missionary of the Church of England Zenana Missionary Society focused her efforts towards children who were "to be dedicated as temple prostitutes", resulting in the creation of the Dohnavur Fellowship, which rescued one thousand children, as well as operated a hospital and engaged in evangelism. After seeing the work of an Anglican religious order called the Wantage Sisters of Fulham, who devoted their lives to caring for prostitutes, Pandita Ramabai—a convert to Christianity—founded the Kripa Sadan (Home of Mercy), a center "for the rehabilitation of prostitutes in India."

== See also ==
- Dance bar
- Mujra
- Nautch
- Tawaif
- Prostitution in India
- Prostitution in Pakistan
