= Nautch =

Popular court dance in royal India

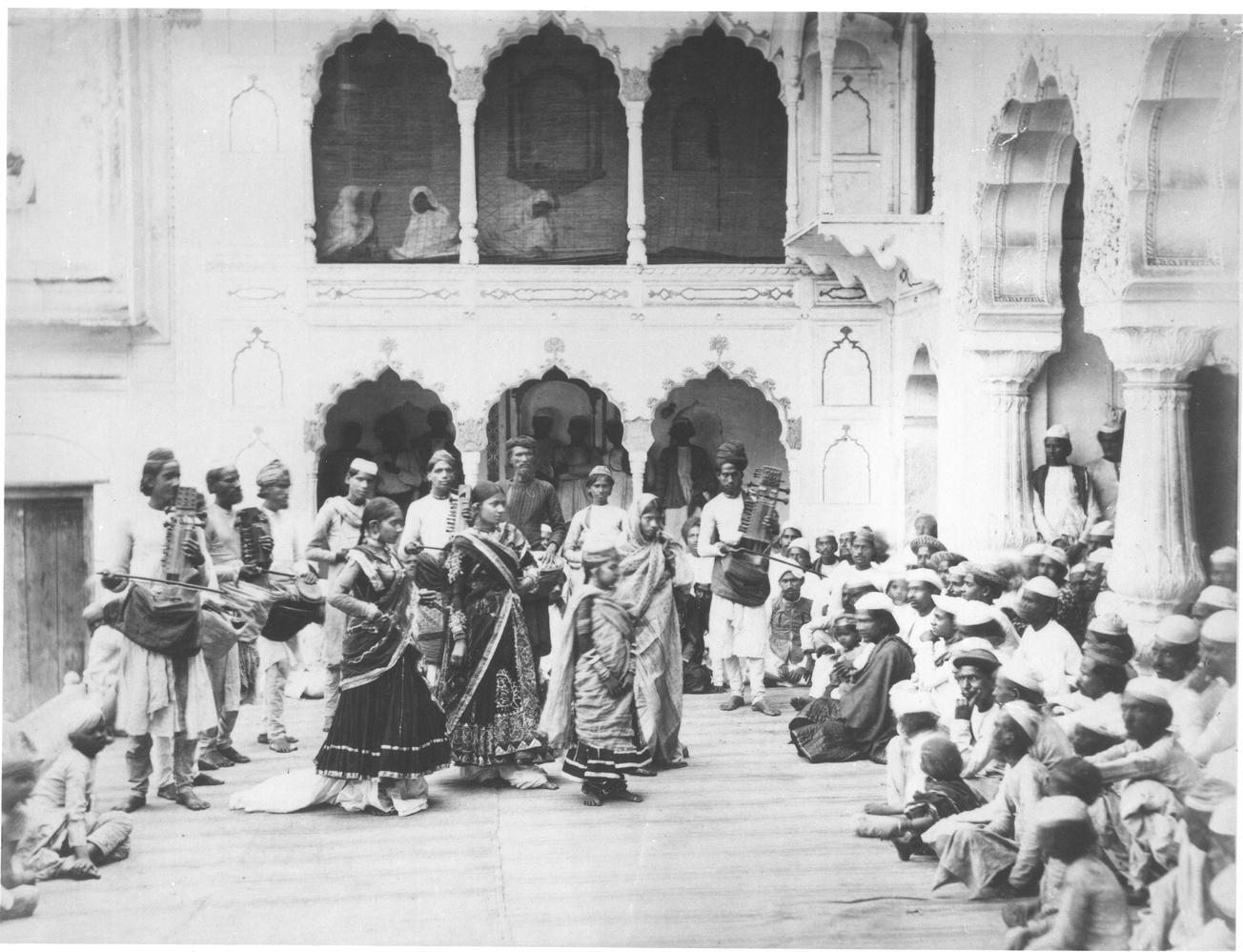
Nautch dancers in Old Delhi, c. 1874

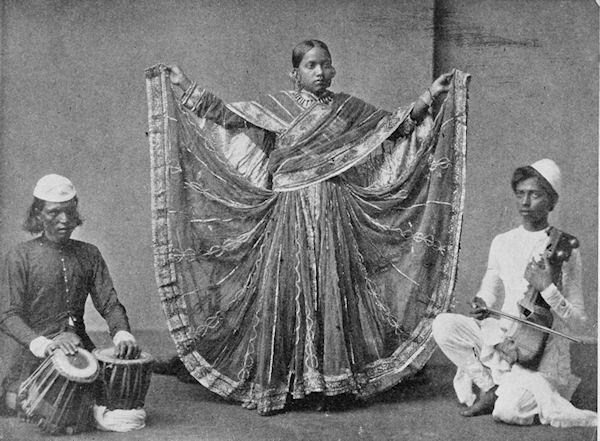
Nautch dancer in Calcutta, c. 1900

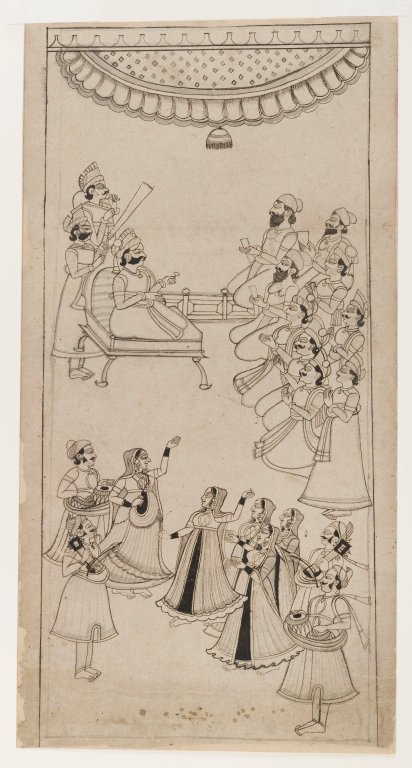
A Raja awaits the arrival of Nautch dancers

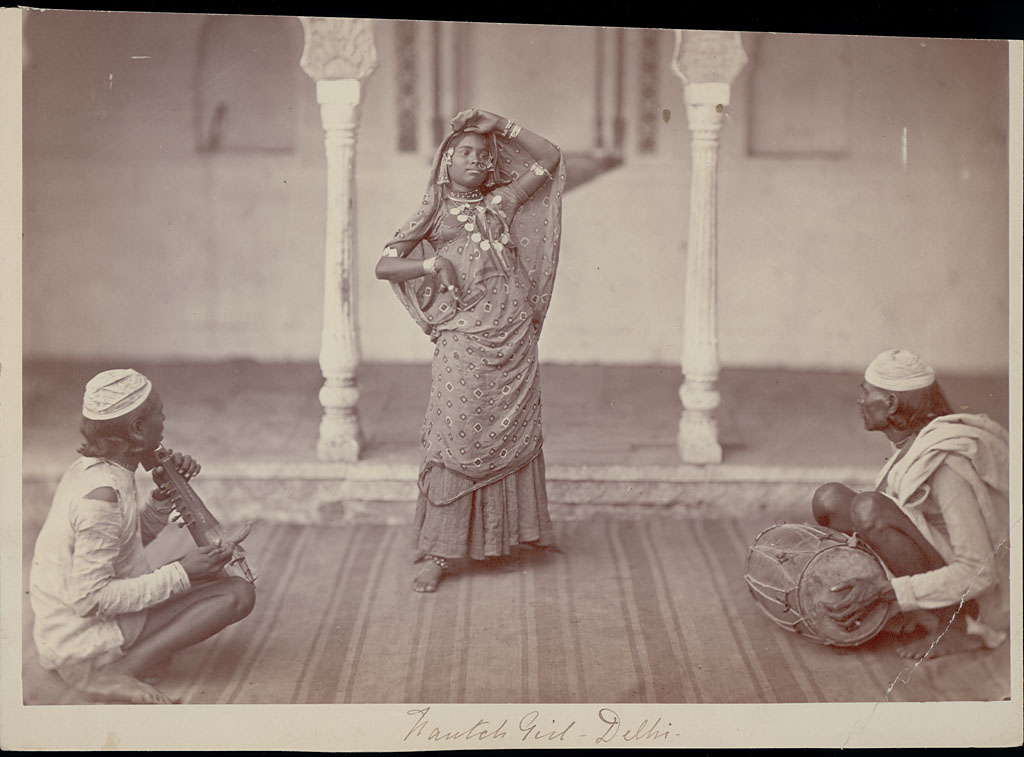
A Nautch girl performing, 1862

The nautch (/ˈnɔːtʃ/, meaning "dance" or "dancing" from Hindustani: "naach") was a popular court dance performed by girls (known as "nautch girls") in later Mughal and colonial India. The word "nautch" was a British corruption of "Nach", the Bengali word for dancing. In the early part of the 19th century, it was the resident Bengalis British supported and created elite with whom they associated most with and they picked up their culture from them. The culture of the performing art of the nautch rose to prominence during the later period of Mughal Empire and the rule of the East India Company.

Over time, the nautch travelled outside the confines of the imperial courts of the Mughals, the palaces of the nawabs and the princely states, and the higher echelons of the officials of the British Raj, to the palaces of zamindars. However under the British Raj they came to be reviled as lewd by the Victorian standards of the British and not well tolerated. As a result, many nautch girls lost their former patrons and were pushed further into prostitution, as local mistresses for the British were replaced with wives from Britain.

Some references use the terms nautch and nautch girls to describe Devadasis who used to perform ritual and religious dances in the Hindu temples of India. However, there is not much similarity between the devadasis and the nautch girls. The former performed dances, mostly Indian classical dances, including the ritual dances, in the precincts of the Hindu temples to please the temple deities, whereas the nautch girls performed nautches for the pleasure of men. In 1917, attributing the adjective to a woman in India would suggest her entrancing skill, tempting style and alluring costume could mesmerize men to absolute obedience.

== History ==
Earlier, devotional dances were performed in the temples by the devdasi for spiritual reasons only. During the mughal era, dance for entertainment became popular, and many rulers took dance girls in their entourages even at their battle-camps. The early British migrants to India were often given tawaifs as welcome gifts or rewards. In 18th century, young princes were sent to nautch girls to learn tehzeeb (elegance and court manners) and culture.

During the Mughal and British era, nautch girls regularly performed at durbars. Nautch girls were also invited to perform on the special events of the native Indians where guests congregated in a separate performance hall, nautch girls sat with the nautch party, composed of attendant musicians and two or more nautch girls, whose numbers vary depending on the status of the host.

Hindi women in general are finely shaped, gentle in their manners, and have something soft and even musical in their voices. An exceedingly graceful dance of the Natch girls is called the "Kite dance". The air is slow and expressive, and the dancers imitate in their gestures the movements of a person flying the kite.

— Julia, Anglo-Indian author (1873)

== Nautch ==
=== Nautch types ===
The nautch, performed only by the girls, evolved into several styles, three of which were most essential, the mor nach (the dance of peacock to attract peahens), patang nach (the kite dance imitating both the kite and the kite flier) and qahar ka nach (the palki pallbearer's dance, erotic and suggestive dance performed as finale) were popular types of dance.

Jealousy and love are hardly ever better portrayed than by the dark flashing eyes, and unrestrained passion, of an Indian natch girl. Very few English admire this exhibition on the first representation, but by repetition it ceases to disgust, and at length, in many cases, comes to form the chief enjoyment of life. It is a fact, however, that whenever this fatal taste is acquired, the moral being of the man becomes more and more enervated, until its healthier European characteristics that are lost in the voluptuous indolence that enthrals the generality of the western Asiatics.

— The English in India, and other sketches, by a traveller (1835)

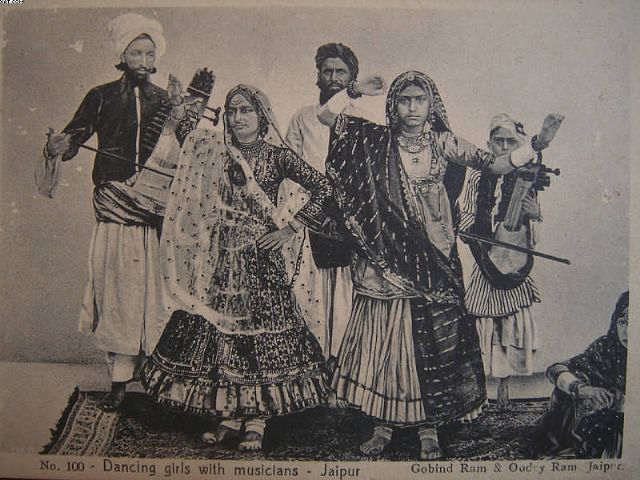
Nautch girls and Musicians in Jaipur

=== Regional variations of the nautch ===
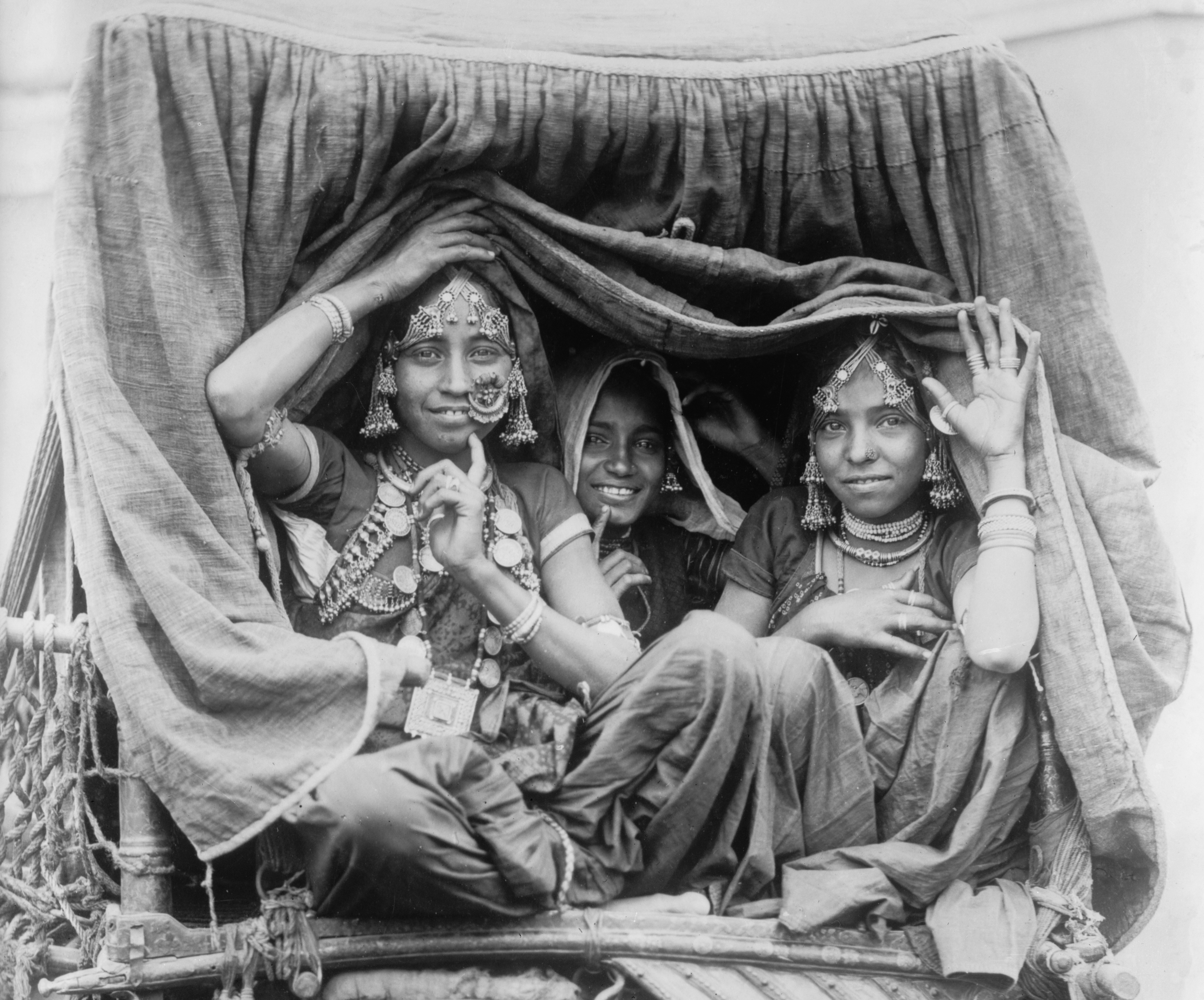
Nautch girls

The "zamindari nautch" patronised by the Zamindar of Baghmundi was known as the araiha, in which two or four nautch girls and two jhumar singers in company of about 20 male dancers took part in the singing and dancing. Part of the songs were repeated by the dancing girls and by the male dancers, and the nautch girls formed a line or a circle to perform a dance similar to the fox-trot as two or three sang, and they repeated the refrain.

== Nautch party ==
The nautch girls performed in small troupes called the "nautch parties", which consisted of just one or two people to 10 or more, including dancers and singer, and their husbands often played the role of musicians and handlers.

=== Nautch girls ===
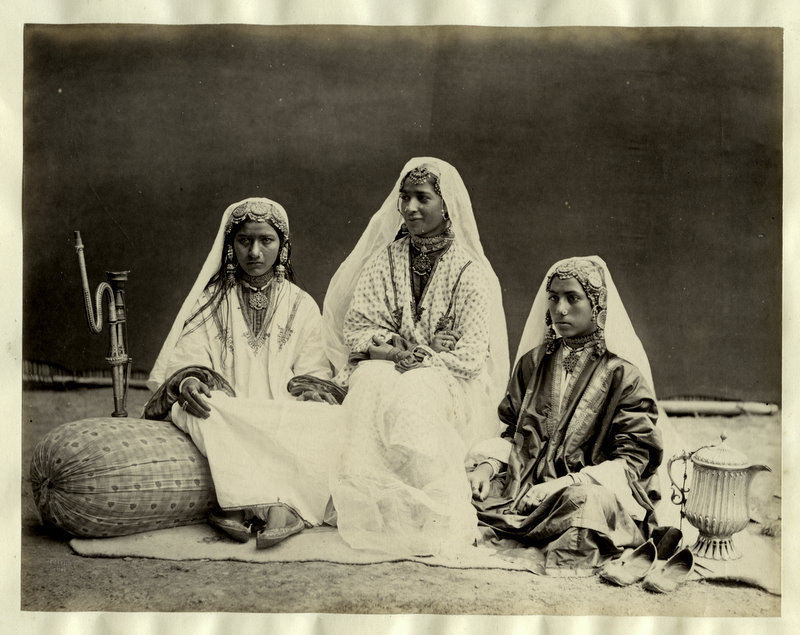
Indian nautch girls from Kashmir in the 1870s

A nautch girl is not a Domni (hereditary female singer), Kasbi (a female belonging to family which practices hereditary sex trade), Randi (first generation prostitute), Tawaif (elegant and cultured female master of arts, including singing and dancing), Kanjari (low-class uncultured Tawaif), Nochi (young girl trainee under a tawaaif) or Devdasi (temple dancer devoted to the practice of spiritual dancing); she belongs to her own distinctive class.

— The Times of India

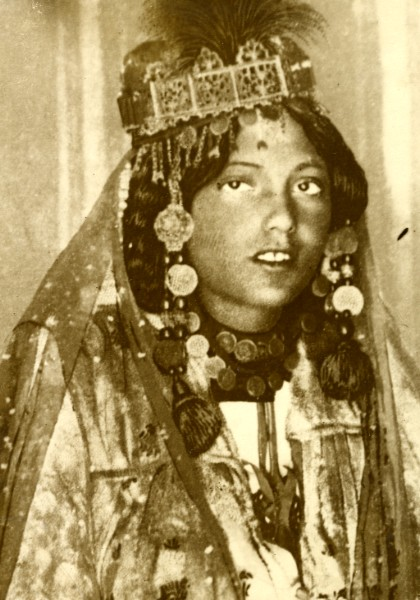
Indian Nautch girl in Bombay

A nautch girl is a dancer who makes a living by entertaining men, women and children of all social classes, regions, castes and religions on various occasions including parties, weddings, christenings, religious ceremonies, and other social events. Their dances were simplified combination of kathak, dasi attam and folk dance. Wandering troops of nautch girls often traveled to different places, performed impromptu roadside dance performances or just turned up uninvited to perform at the homes of their richer patrons who were customarily obliged to pay them. They performed everywhere, in the homes of their patrons, public places or on stage, also in Mughal courts, palaces of nawabs, mahals (castles) of rajas, bungalows of British officers, homes of nobles, havelis (mansions) of zamindars (landowners) and many other places.Nautch from the Beria community in Uttar Pradesh who perform public dances are called Berin. Nautchs from the Gand or Gondh communities in central India are called Deogarni. Groups of nautchs from the Telangana region in southern India are called Bogams. These groups of folk artists are all Hindu.

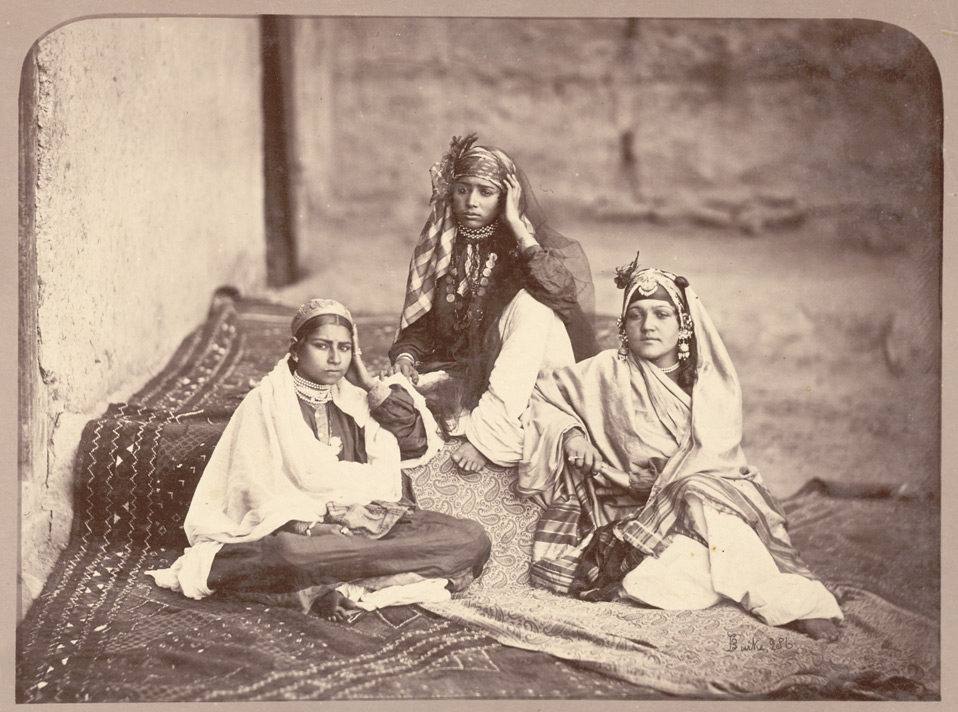
Indian professional dancing nautch girls in Kabul for the Afghan emir Abdur Rahman Khan, 1879

They [nautch girls] are extremely delicate in their person, soft and regular in their features, with a form of perfect symmetry, and although dedicated from infancy to this profession, they in general preserve a decency and modesty in their demeanor, which is more likely to allure than the shameless effrontery of similar characters in other countries.

— James Forbes (artist) (1749–1819), Oriental Memoirs (1813)

=== Nautch musicians ===
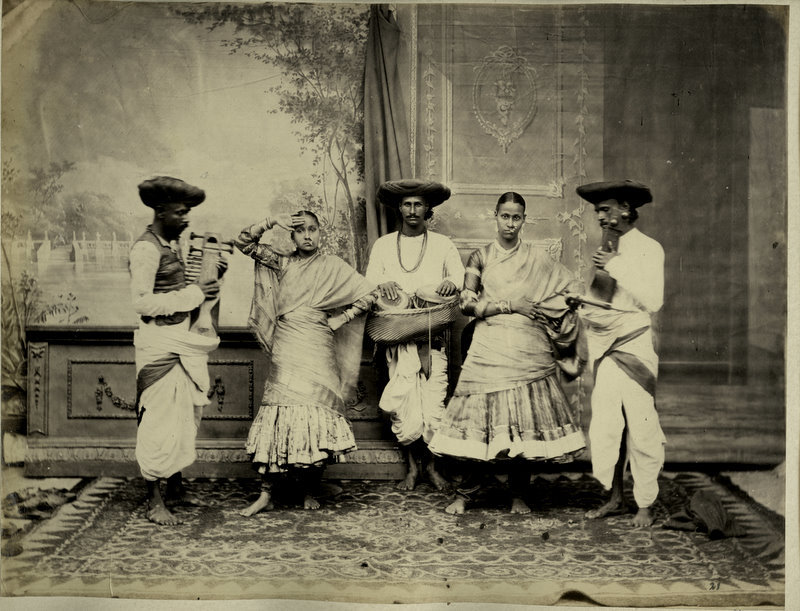
Indian nautch girls and musicians in the 1870s

The nautch party musicians historically played four instruments: sarangi, tabla, manjeera and dholak. A fifth instrument, the harmonium, was introduced in the beginning of the 20th century. Musicians performed while standing in the courts, palaces and the homes of rich patrons. They performed while sitting in the homes of poor patrons and in public performances. Singers of the nautch party used thumri, dadra, ghazal and geet.

=== Nautch handlers: mama and muhafiz ===
A mama, usually an older and experienced maidservant, who sat in a corner of the dais preparing paan (betel nut) and beedi (Indian cigar) for patrons, was responsible for taking care of nautch girls, their meals, and safekeeping of the jewelry worn by them. A muhafiz was an unarmed guard who maintained order, acted as usher, and ensured protection during performance and travel. Mashalchis (one or two lamp bearers) of the troupe were responsible for the lighting during night performances.

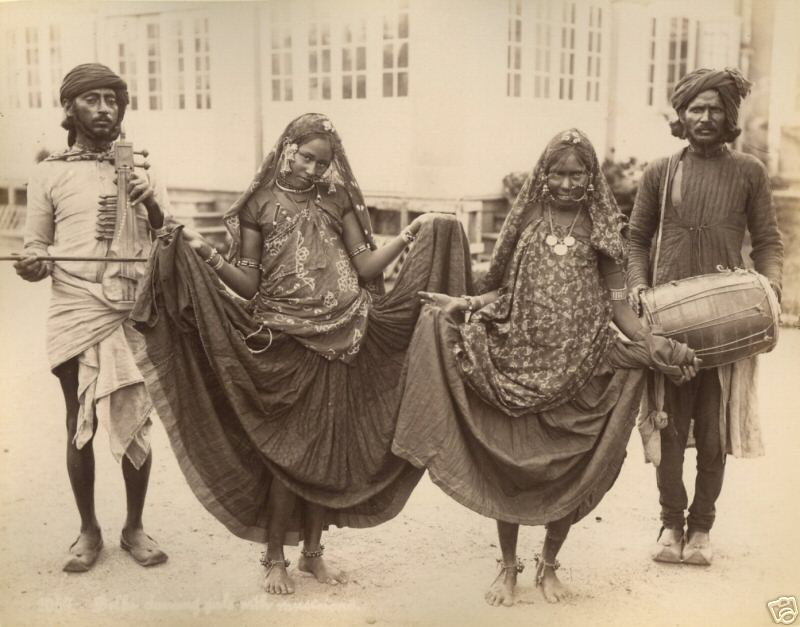
Delhi Nautch girls and musicians

The tent was most glaringly lighted, massaulchis or torch-bearers stood here and there ready to attend to any person who might require them…we had scarcely seated ourselves ere two of them made their appearance, floating into our presence, all tinsel colored muslin and ornaments: they were followed by three musicians, and attended by a couple of mussaulchis who held their torches first to the face and then lower down as if showing off the charms of the dancers to the best advantage.

— Lieutenant Thomas Bacon, Description of Late Evening Nautch

== Famous nautch girls ==
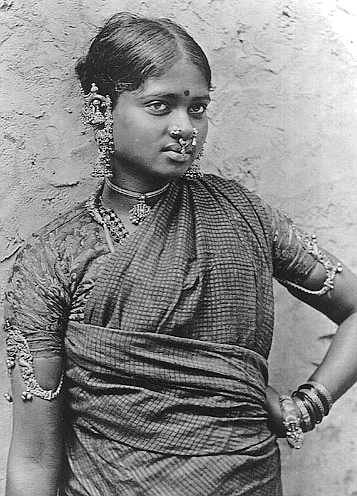
Tamil nautch, 1910

Roopmati was a famous Hindu nautch girl from Saharanpur, who married Baz Bahadur, the Muslim sultan of Malwa. Akbar the Great is said to have invaded Malwa after hearing about her beauty. In 1561 Akbar's army, led by Adham Khan and Pir Muhammad Khan, attacked Malwa and defeated Baz Bahadur in the battle of Sarangpur (29 March 1561). One of the reasons for Adham Khan's attack seems to be his lust for Rani Roopmati. She, however, poisoned herself upon hearing of the fall of Mandu. Baz Bahadur fled to Khandesh.

Pyari Jan was a famous nautch girl of Delhi in 1815.

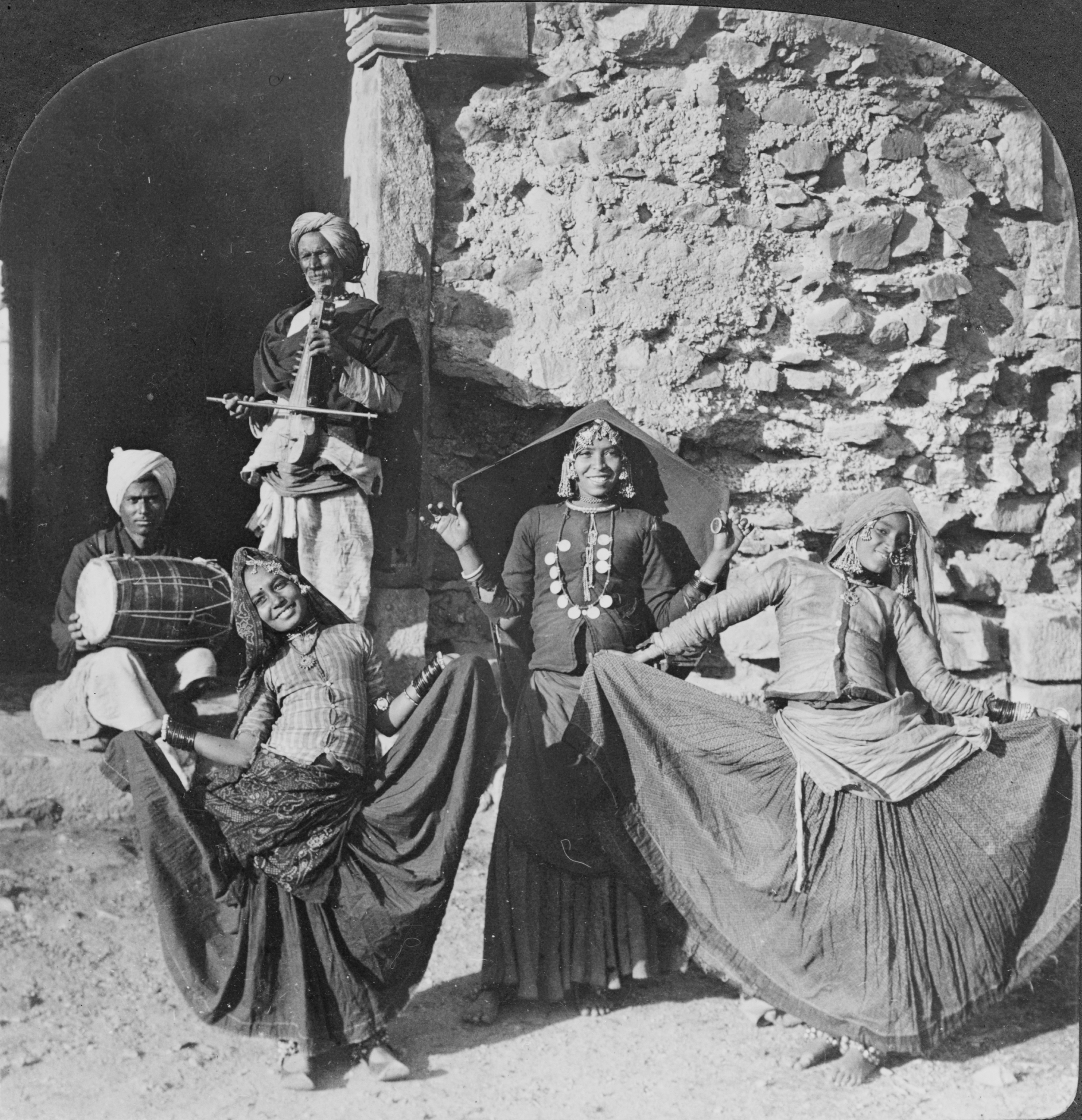
Nautch girls and musicians in old Delhi

From time immemorial Indian poets have sung praises of the 'public woman', the professional entertainer. The epics give us a colourful description of her intimate connection with royal splendour. The Puranas highlight her auspicious presence as a symbol of good luck. Buddhist literature also testifies to the high esteem in which she was held in society. She appears through the ages in different incarnations from apsara [celestial virgin] in divine form to ganika [attendant], devdasi [spiritual dancer], nartika [ordinary dancer], kanchani, tawaif [cultured professional courtesan] and nautch girl [dancer member of the professional troupe].

— Pran Nevile

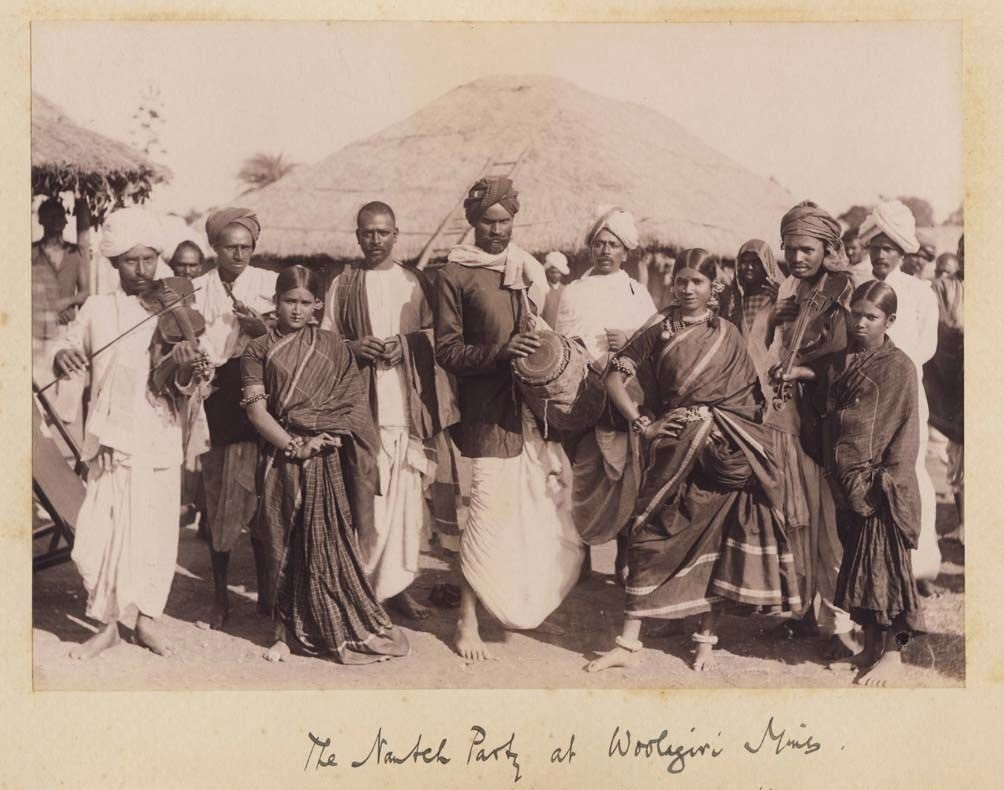
The Nautch performing at Woolagiri Mines, 1895

Begum Samru (christened as Joanna Nobilis Sombre) was an 18th-century ruler who started her life as a nautch girl and became ruler of Sardhana, a small principality near Meerut and the only ever Catholic ruler of India. She rose to prominence through marriage to her European husband Walter Reinhardt Sombre and inherited his estate after his death. She is buried in the Basilica of our Lady of Graces, which she commissioned.

== Anti-Nautch movement ==
The shift in attitude to nautch girls can be attributed to the British Raj, who after capturing Lahore from the Sikhs after the Anglo-Sikh wars did not share the same attitude towards dancing girls.

While the British men were happy to take local women as concubines and mistresses they were uninterested in becoming patrons of the formerly well tolerated courtesans of Lahore, and even less interested in spending lavish sums upon them. The Victorian purity movement, which spread from England to the colonies and the Indian mutiny of 1857 further reinforced these views on local practices such as dancing girls which were seen as lewd by the Victorian standards of the British Raj. British women were imported into India (and modern day Pakistan) as respectable wives to replace local mistresses.

== Decline in patronage, shift towards prostitution ==
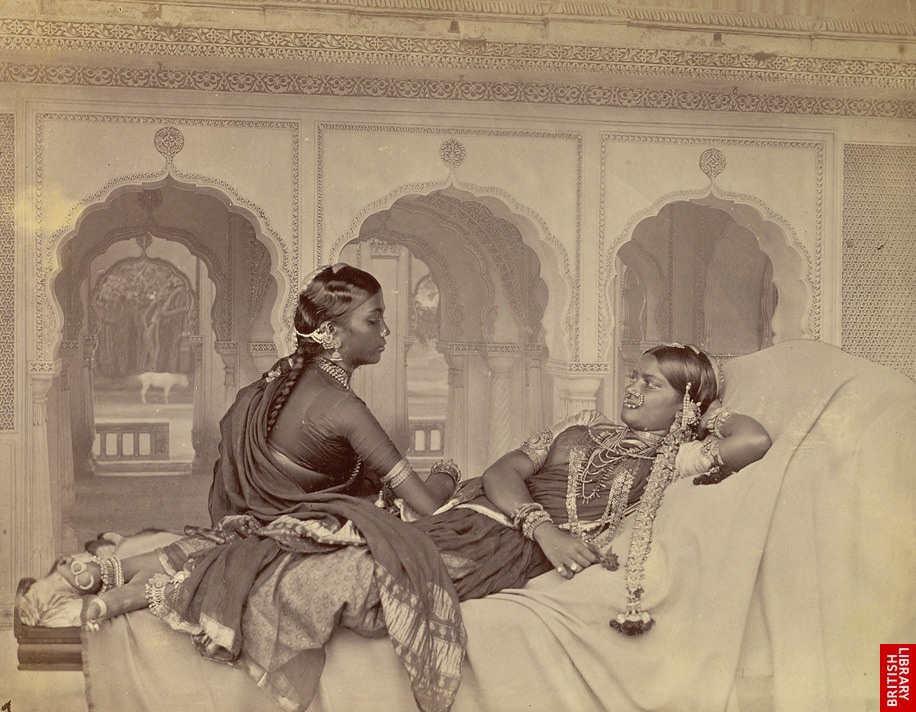
Nautch girls, Hyderabad; a photo commissioned by the Indian government in the 19th century; the colonial authorities designated a "prostitute class" for the dancers.

In the mid-nineteenth century, with the spread of western education and pressure from the increased number of Christian missionaries after the opening of the Suez Canal in 1869, dance was stigmatized and shunned by Europeans and Indians alike. Consequently, nautch girls abandoned by their patrons were often forced to take up prostitution for survival, and by the early 20th century the respectable art of the nautch had acquired a derogatory connotation.

== See also ==
- Dance bar
- Dance in India
- Tawaif
- Devadasi
- Ghawazi
- Ouled Naïl
- Indian classical dance
- List of Indian folk dances
- Mujra
- Naach, a 2004 dance film
- The Nautch Girl, a 1891 opera
- Nautch Girls of India, a 1996 book
- Habba Khatoon
- Bani Thani
- Kanjirottu Yakshi
