= Mujra =

Traditional Indian dance form performed by courtesans

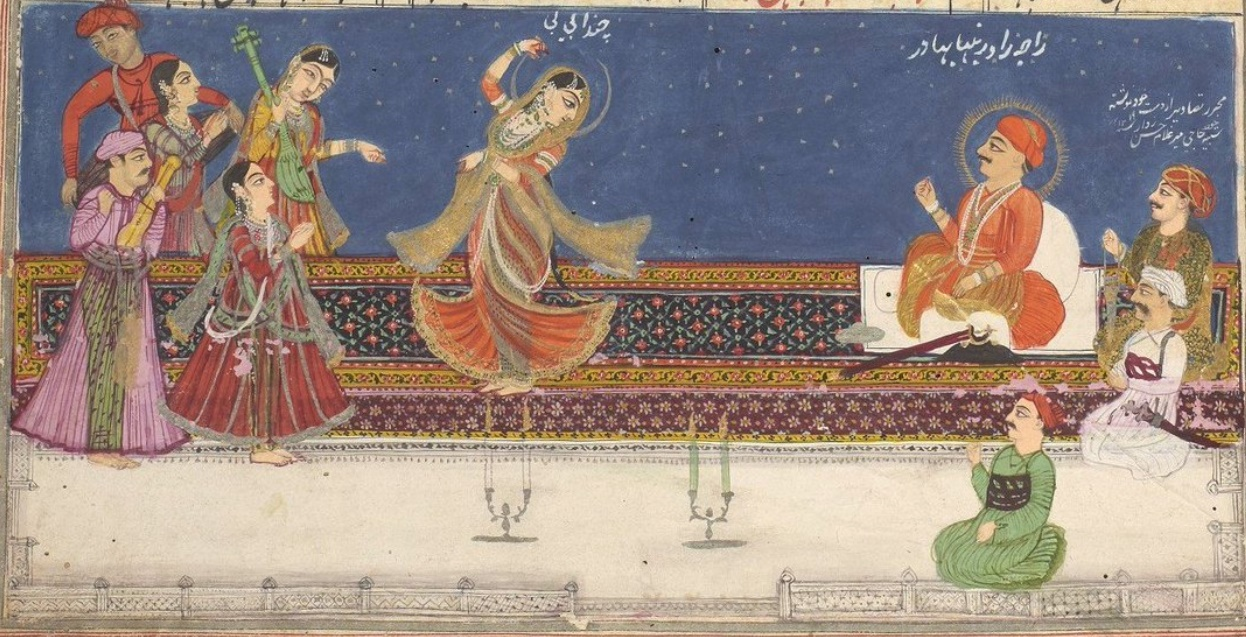
Tawaif Mah Laqa Bai dancing in court

Mujra is a dance performance that emerged during Mughal rule in Indian subcontinent, where the elite class and local rulers like the nawabs (often connected to the Mughal emperor's court) used to frequent tawaifs (courtesans) for entertainment.

== Background and history ==
It combines elements of the Indian classical Kathak dance with Hindustani classical music including thumris and ghazals. It also includes poems from other Mughal periods like the emperors from Akbar to Bahadur Shah Zafar's ruling periods. Mujra was traditionally performed at mehfils and in special houses called kothas. During Mughal rule in the subcontinent, in places such as Delhi, Lucknow, Jaipur, Lahore the tradition of performing mujra was a family art and often passed down from mother to daughter. These courtesans or tawaifs had some power and prestige due to their access to the elite class and some of them came to be known as authorities on culture. Some noble families would send their sons to them to learn etiquette and the art of conversation from them. They were sometimes called Nautch girls which included dancers, singers and playmates of their patron nawabs.

In Lahore, Mughal Empire's Heera Mandi neighbourhood, the profession was a cross between art and exotic dance, with the performers often serving as courtesans amongst Mughal royalty or wealthy patrons. "The wealthy even sent their sons to the salons of tawaifs, high-class courtesans that have been likened to Japanese geishas, to study etiquette."

Mujra dance consolidates elements of classical Kathak dance with local music, including thumris and ghazals. It also incorporates poetry from the Mughal era. True mujra is elegant, sophisticated and artistic, presented with taste and elegance. In the past, tawaifs would also be invited to perform mujra on important occasions such as marriage or the birth of a male heir. During the British colonial period, some tawaifs became prostitute and some prostitutes also called their erotic dances mujra dance. Mujra dance gradually became associated with prostitution.

As a musical genre, mujras historically reconstruct an aesthetic culture of sixteenth-to-nineteenth-century South Asia in which heightened musical and dance entertainment afforded a medium for exchange between one woman and many men — what ethnomusicologist Regula Qureshi calls, "an asymmetry of power that is tempered with gentility."

== Present day ==
Modern Mujra dancers perform at events like weddings, birthday and bachelor parties in countries where traditional Mughal culture is prevalent, such as Pakistan. To a lesser extent, dancers in Pakistan often perform a modern form of mujra along with popular local music.

In 2005, when dance bars were closed across Maharashtra state, many former bar girls moved to 'Congress House' near Kennedy Bridge on Grant Road area in Mumbai, the city's oldest hub for mujra, and started performing mujra there. The women are trained in mujra in Agra of India and Lahore and Karachi of Pakistan. Dawn newspaper, Karachi, describes Lahore's Heera Mandi area as, "Pakistan's oldest red light district was for centuries, a hub of traditional erotic dancers, musicians and prostitutes."

In many areas of the Indian subcontinent, they are called by different names – for example they are called tawaifs in North India and Pakistan (in Hindi and Urdu-speaking areas), baijis in Bengal, and naikins in Goa.

Most women hope for an international dance career or South Asian dance career at a film studio.

Mujra in the Marathi, Urdu and Hindi languages means:

- Payment of respects
- Musical performance by a dancing-girl
- To salute deferentially

== In popular culture ==
Mujra has been depicted in Bollywood films like Mehndi (1958), Mughal-e-Azam (1960), Pakeezah (1972), Umrao Jaan (1981), Zindagi Ya Toofan (1958) and Devdas (1955), or in other films that show the past Mughal rule and its culture. The dance is upscaled and taught with more dance choreography to make the female dancer more fluent in her moves and to be more artistic and feminine. The women are usually the center of the public eye and can dance and entertain the audience for a long time.

It has also been depicted in the Indian television series Heeramandi.

In Pakistan's Lollywood films like Anjuman (1970), one can see many mujra dances being performed before the movie is over while in Pakistani dramas such as Deewar-e-Shab (2019) and Umrao Jaan Ada (2003), there were also several Mujra performances.

A documentary about mujra dancers called Showgirls of Pakistan was released globally in 2021. It is a feature-length documentary directed by Pakistani film maker Saad Khan.

== See also ==
- Dance bar (India)
- Nautch
