= Dance bar =

Term in India for adult bars

Dance bar is a term used in India to refer to bars in which adult entertainment in the form of dances by relatively well-covered women are performed for male patrons in exchange for cash. Dance bars used to be present only in Maharashtra, but later spread across the country, mainly in cities. Dance bars are a flirtatious world of fantasy catering to the need of feeling of being wanted.

Dance bars were banned in the state of Maharashtra in August 2005, which was first struck down by the Bombay High Court on 12 April 2006, and the verdict was upheld by the Supreme Court in July 2013. The Maharashtra government banned dance bars again in 2014 by an Ordinance, but this too was found "unconstitutional" by the Supreme Court in October 2015, allowing Mumbai dance bars to reopen.

== History ==
The first dance bars were in Khalapur in the Raigad district of Maharashtra, in the early 1980s. The first dance bar in Pune district was hotel Kapila International.

== Bar setting ==
=== Clothing ===
Bar dancing in India, markedly differs from erotic dancing and nightclub dance in the Western world and some parts of the Eastern world. In a way, it is more similar to bellydancing performed as entertainment. The dancers, known as bar girls, remain significantly clothed throughout the performance, showing at most some midriff, part of the back, and bare arms. Therefore, the erotic aspect of bar dancing is mostly achieved through suggestion. In Maharashtra, bar dancer attire is often ethnic Indian (sari or lehenga-choli), whereas in some other places, such as Bangalore, it may include Western garb. The bar dances are often compared to mujras, wherein women would dance to live classical Indian music, traditionally performed by tawaif (courtesans) during the Mughal era.

=== Dancer protocol ===
The dance, per se, is not pernicious, but it's the dance in that particular place, where liquor is served and clients are sitting getting boozed. Then the whole atmosphere becomes conducive for men to tease girls, or to book girls for further prostitution.

— Deputy Police Commissioner of Mumbai in 2006.

Bar girls dance to Bollywood and Indipop numbers on a colourfully lit dance floor, in the central focus of a dance bar's seating arrangement. Patrons sit in chairs lined up against the walls of the room. The dancing is minimalist kind and features no pelvic thrusting and bosom heaving seen typical Bollywood dance, nor any belly-dancing or suggestive gyrations. Most of the time, bar girls reservedly sway to music, in a movement designed for the conservation of energy, until they find a patron whose attention they wish to attract, or are called upon by a patron. They then dance in front of the patron, making fleeting eye contact, pointing, gesturing, or generally making their targeted patron "feel special". No bodily contact between the two is allowed, and the bar dancers often stay within the confines of the dance floor. Male waiters hover over patrons and dancers who get too close to each other, both to oversee transactions between the two as well as ostensibly to prevent sex-for-money deals being made. Patrons sometimes shower bar girls with currency notes, which generally results in more animated dancing.

=== Income ===
The patron showers his favoured dancer with currency notes. He does this either by handing over nominal denominations of cash (10 or 20 rupee notes), or through an act known as "scratching", where he holds a wad of currency notes above his dancer and rubs notes off the wad down upon the dancer. In some cases, he would even garland the dancer with rupees. Many bar dancers are able to make hundreds of rupees a night in this way, thanks to generous, well-off, and possibly inebriated patrons. At the end of the day, each girl's earnings are counted and split in some predetermined proportion between the dance bar and the girls. The dance bars also make money through the sale of alcohol and snacks. Most women earned up to ₹10,000 (US$100) a month, this attracted women from all over India and even as far away as Nepal and Bangladesh, especially as dance bars was considered by them as a safer way to make a living, than working in the Mumbai's red-light district.

Income depended on the popularity and status of the bar girl. The Hindustan Times reported that the less popular girls were given 60% of the amount showered on them. It also stated that popular girls received a monthly salary of ₹ 100,000–300,000, while the bar owner kept all the money showered on them.

=== Social and economic aspects ===
Dance bars closed at midnight, but in 2000, the government changed the rule to permit them to stay open until 1:30 am. However, this was changed to 12:30 am, following the rape of a minor at Marine Drive, Mumbai in 2005, although the rape was committed by a police constable inside a police chowki (station). Once dance bars end by 2 am, the bar owners provide security and safe transport to home the bar dance girls, many of these girls are married with children. Their clients are from all strata of society, including college students, corporate workers and even schoolboys who bribe to get in.

Policemen and local thugs also make money off regular haftas from the dance bars. Dance bars serve as a meeting place for criminals, making them a hub for intelligence gathering by police.

Laws were enacted and court cases were filed to shut down the dance bars to advance political fortunes and curry favor with moralist public and also due to the breakdown bribery arrangements between the dance bar owners and authorities who were deeply entrenched in the sexual economy of dance bars.

== Dance bars outside Maharashtra ==
Dance bars exist in other parts of India, although they are illegal.

On 4 June 2006, the Crime Branch of the Delhi Police busted the El Dorado dance bar in Hotel Rajdoot on Mathura Road, and arrested 13 dance bar girls and one of the hotel owners on charges ranging from obscenity to immoral trafficking and abetment. The girls were aged between 20 and 30 and came from lower-middle-class families. Four of them were from Delhi, two each were from Bihar, Noida and Punjab and one each from Kolkata and Allahabad. The girls had previously been employed in Mumbai dance bars, but shifted to Delhi after those establishments were banned.

== In popular culture ==
Dance bars have been theme of several films, such as Chandni Bar. Dance bars are also regularly featured in item songs in Bollywood movies. Chandni Bar, a 2001 film in which Tabu played role of a Bar Dancer. Deepika Padukone played the role of a bar dancer 'Mohini' from Maharashtra during the time of the ban in the 2014 film Happy New Year.

== Controversies ==
Dance bars were banned in the state of Maharashtra, in August 2005, with the passing of the Maharashtra Police (Amendment) Act, 2005. Subsequently, the government shut down dance bars. However, many continued to flourish as late as 2011, although in a clandestine way in Mumbai and its outskirts. Mumbai alone had 700 dance bars, at their peak in April 2005 when it was banned, though officially only 307 dance bars existed, the rest were illegal, while the figures for rest of the state was 650 dance bars in total. In all they employed 150,000 people, including 75,000 bar girls. These bars functioned as fronts for prostitution. After the ban was enforced, no rehabilitation program was initiated for the nightclub dancers, known as bar-balas. Many moved to Dubai and other Middle Eastern countries, while others went to New Delhi, Chennai and Hyderabad.

The ban was first struck down by the Bombay High Court on 12 April 2006, and the verdict was upheld by the Supreme Court in July 2013. The Hindu reported that the number of women employed in bars in Maharashtra was around 20,000 in September 2013. Most of them were waitresses or singers at orchestra bars.

The Maharashtra government banned dance bars again in 2014 by an Ordinance, but this too was found "unconstitutional" by the Supreme Court in October 2015, allowing Mumbai dance bars to reopen. On 25 February 2004, following the raid, the Maharashtra government issued a notification restricting persons below the age of 21 from entering dance bars, discothèques and pubs. Bars violating the law would face fines and possible cancellation of licences. The ban, under the Bombay Prohibition Act, was effective from 1 April 2004.

== See also ==
- List of public house topics
- Tawaif
- Nautch
- Prostitution in colonial India
- Prostitution in India
