= Prajwala =

Organization against prostitution and sex trafficking

- Founded: 1996; 30 years ago
- Founders: Ms. Sunitha Krishnan and Brother Jose Vetticatil
- Type: Non-Governmental Organization
- Purpose: Anti-Sex Trafficking
- Location: Hyderabad, India
- Employees: 200
- Website: www.prajwalaindia.com

Prajwala is a non-governmental organization based in Hyderabad, India, devoted exclusively to eradicating prostitution and sex trafficking. Founded in 1996 by Ms. Sunitha Krishnan and Brother Jose Vetticatil, the organization actively works in the areas of prevention, rescue, rehabilitation, re-integration, and advocacy to combat trafficking in every dimension and restore dignity to victims of commercial sexual exploitation.

Currently, Prajwala runs seventeen transition centers for children of women in prostitution, three crisis counseling centers in police stations, a production-cum-training unit for economic rehabilitation, and a therapeutic shelter home for sex trafficked women and children, the majority of whom are HIV positive. Out of its 200 employees, 70% are survivors themselves. Prajwala also forms partnerships with local communities, civil society, corporate agencies and government bodies on various aspects of prevention, protection and prosecution throughout India and the world.

== Mission ==
Prajwala holds the conviction that sex trafficking is the worst form of human rights violation and flesh trade the oldest form of sexual slavery. The organization is dedicated to creating a trafficking-free society where no woman or child is sexually exploited and no human being is treated as a commodity. The larger goal is to demonstrate best field practices for up-scaling, replication and adaptation by state and non-state agencies to ensure anti-trafficking mechanisms are in place.

== History ==
The philosophy of Prajwala evolved after the oldest red light district of Hyderabad city, Mehboob ki Mehindi, was forcibly evacuated in 1996. As a result, thousands of women caught in the clutches of prostitution were suddenly uprooted, homeless and displaced. Based on the women's plea for a dignified future for their children, two visionaries—a Catholic Missionary named Brother Jose Vetticatil and a then Hindu nun Ms. Sunitha Krishnan—joined forces to initiate an intervention to prevent minors from entering the sex trade. This program, called Prevention Through Education, initially consisted of a small school run out of a vacated brothel.

The ongoing process of interaction with the women posed a threat to the traffickers, the middle-men, and the brokers, which led to a long challenge and struggle for the core team of Prajwala. The founders were faced with life-threatening situations a number of times, which they braved through with the conviction that a viable alternative is possible. The enormity of the situation and the vastness of the task did not stop Prajwala from making a small change in this community. As the journey progressed, Prajwala's reach expanded to meet the multifold needs of victims and establish a wide range of anti-trafficking initiatives, with full faith in people's participation in the process of social transformation.

== The Approach ==
Over the years, Prajwala evolved need-based interventions through a multi-pronged, strategic approach, consisting of five pillars: prevention, rescue, rehabilitation, re-integration, and advocacy.

=== Prevention ===
Prajwala uses value-based education as a primary tool to prevent children of women in prostitution from entering this trade. The organization's transition centers in Hyderabad function as bridging schools which not only foster the overall development of the children, but also equip them with the necessary psychosocial and scholastic skills to ensure a bright future that breaks the cycles of poverty and social exclusion. Mothers as well as local leaders serve as key contributors and partners in this program. Till date these centers have reached out to over 7,000 children and prevented them from being inducted into inter-generational prostitution.

The organization also builds the capacities of individuals and groups through active linkage with community members, police and district administration to create a zero tolerance for commercial sexual exploitation. In 2011, Prajwala initiated a mass campaign called Men Against Demand (MAD), which mobilises men to take a stand against seeking paid sex and encourages them to fight against sex trafficking by abolishing its demand. Since its inception, Prajwala's Community-based Prevention Program has sensitised over 8 million people.

=== Rescue ===
In the initial years, Prajwala had negative experiences with cops, so the Rescue and Restoration Program team worked independently, without police cooperation. However, when a member of the team—an ex-pimp—was brutally murdered in 1999, Prajwala began collaborating with law enforcement officials to conduct joint rescue operations.

Sometimes, the men pose as customers, either to act as decoys during a raid or to gather information about a brothel. Survivors work as counselors, giving immediate guidance to the terrified rescued girls. None of them have weapons, and the threat of violence is constant. But Prajwala offers its employees something precious—the opportunity to make a profound impact in people’s lives day after day.

Today, Prajwala regularly partners with Anti-Human Trafficking Units (ATHUs), State CID inspectors and Women Protection Cells across India to investigate and rescue women from the flesh trade. The organization extends moral, financial, legal and social support to victims and ensures that perpetrators are brought to justice. Prajwala also operates three Crisis Counseling Centers in police stations at entry and exit points throughout Hyderabad to identify minors in prostitution and intercept trafficking cases. So far, the organization has rescued over 9,500 victims from commercial sexual exploitation.

=== Rehabilitation ===
In order to address the multi-dimensional needs of trafficked victims, Prajwala facilitates psychological, economic and civic aspects of rehabilitation for rescued children and adults.

Prajwala has built a residential shelter home 65 km close to Hyderabad to provide a safe and healing environment for young women and girls rescued from the flesh trade. When they first arrive, victims often attempt to escape or commit suicide due to extreme post-traumatic stress disorder, Stockholm syndrome and life-threatening diseases such as HIV/AIDS, which is why crisis counseling and psychosocial support is provided to aid the healing process. With the help of social workers, medical staff, caretakers and teachers, Prajwala also provides health care, education, yoga & meditation, nutritious diet, therapeutic programs & activities, and life-skills & vocational training.

As part of economic empowerment, Prajwala helps survivors acquire the skills and capacities needed to gain a dignified livelihood and thrive independently. In the small-scale production-cum-training unit, survivors become experts in non-conventional trades such as welding, bookbinding, carpentry, desktop publishing and screen printing.

Prajwala’s focus has been on tapping the innate potential and strengths of these survivors in ventures aimed at their re-integration into the mainstream society as equals. This means capitalizing on the strength that the girls were forced to acquire – their fearlessness and lack of inhibition.

The economic rehabilitation strategy involves intensive need and aptitude-based research, combined with market assessment in order to produce viable and sustainable economic opportunities. Prajwala works in cooperation with the corporate sector to place survivors in jobs according to their interests, such as taxi drivers, camera operators, housekeepers, security guards, nursing attendants, masons and more. Over the years, hundreds of survivors have been trained in the production-cum-training unit and secured employment outside of the organization in service, hospitality, and construction industries.

Prajwala's final phase of rehabilitation entails gaining a civic identity through provision of immediate relief benefits, housing, health, ration and electoral photo identification cards. Over the years, 521 survivors have been given housing under the weaker section's housing scheme—a subsidised government welfare program. As Nirbhaya project advisor in Kerala, Ms. Krishnan has also successfully appealed the government to provide financial compensation to minor rape victims.

=== Re-integration ===
In order to help survivors successfully re-integrate into mainstream society, Prajwala re-unites them with their families, arranges for their marriage, and supports independent-living arrangements. In 2007, Prajwala launched the survivor's movement Aparajita (meaning "those who remain undefeated against all odds"), which is a network for re-integrated survivors to access social support and a platform for advocacy. A two-day National Survivor's Conference was organized by Prajwala in 2011 in which 40 Aparajita members prepared a charter on the course to be adopted in rescue and rehabilitation of trafficked victims, which was presented to the Supreme Court to implement as a Victim Protection Protocol.

=== Advocacy ===
Prajwala has worked relentlessly to bring about a change in the attitude of India's government for victim-friendly policies, as well as awareness regarding sex trafficking, through political, legal, and media advocacy.

==== Policy and legal advocacy ====
In 2002, Prajwala conducted an action research and publication of a document entitled The Shattered Innocence on inter-state trafficking from Andhra Pradesh to other states, revealing the reality and magnitude of the crime along with a demographic profile of vulnerable communities. Upon submitting this report to the government, a state-level consultation on the need for a multi-sectoral approach to address the issue emerged.

In collaboration with Prajwala, the Department of Women and Child Welfare started taking a proactive role in all post-rescue work. As a result of Prajwala's lobbying efforts, a high-level state coordination committee was formed with secretaries of all relevant government departments. Draft guidelines of the state policy to combat trafficking was prepared by Prajwala, and after state-level cabinet member approval, the policy was brought forth as GO Ms 1 on Jan 1, 2003.

In 2013, Prajwala lobbied extensively for an anti-trafficking policy in Kerala called the Nirbhaya Fund Scheme for Women and Children, and Ms. Sunitha Krishnan became the state advisor for this groundbreaking policy. She was also appointed as a member of the Andhra Pradesh State Women's Commission and contributed to India's new Bill on Rape, which was passed in Parliament in 2013 to increase punitive measures for sexual violence and assault.

Furthermore, Ms. Sunitha Krishnan has conducted sensitisation workshops for thousands of senior police officers, judges, prosecutors and Child Welfare Committee members to equip them with the requisite understanding and skills to effectively handle cases of human trafficking and advocate for child-friendly courts. As a result, police personnel ranking from Superintendents to Sub Inspectors have been trained on how to combat the crime and address the psycho-social needs of victims during and after rescue.

==== Media advocacy ====
In collaboration with internationally acclaimed director Rajesh Touchriver, Prajwala has produced several films on sex trafficking and child sexual abuse to educate and sensitise the masses. The 2005 documentary Anamika—The Nameless won the AC award under "Best Foreign Award" category, Best Editing from Festival Cine de Granada and Best Documentary Film Award at the HIFF. The film has since been included in the curriculum of India's National Police Academy and National Judicial Academy. Prajwala's shockingly vivid film The Sacred Face also broke the silence about the horrors of incest among high-level officials in Hyderabad.

In 2009, Ms. Sunitha Krishnan gave a speech during an official TED India conference about Prajwala's work, which has since inspired over 2.5 million viewers globally. Her July 2012 appearance on Aamir Khan’s television show Satyamev Jayate was instrumental in not only garnering huge funds but also networking with business owners willing to provide job placements for survivors. In addition, Prajwala sensitised over 3,000 corporate houses through the INK and The Indus Entrepreneurs (TiE) conferences, which made a deep impact on the attendees.

In January 2013, Prajwala launched its bilingual feature film on sex trafficking titled Ente in Malayalam and Na Bangaru Talli in Telugu. The Chief Minister of Kerala Shri Oommen Chandy and Social Welfare Minister M. K. Muneer attended the debut audio release of Ente in Kochi as well as the film's premier in Trivandrum. Na Bangaru Talli has won 5 international awards in 2013, including Best Feature Film Award at Trinity International Film Festival, USA and Award of Excellence from IFFCRM, Indonesia.

== Founders ==
Ms. Sunitha Krishnan is a rare breed of individual who has committed her life as a full-time volunteer in Prajwala. A mental health professional, she has done extensive research and is essentially a field practitioner. She has been instrumental in rescuing thousands of children from severely abusive conditions and restoring childhood to them. Ms. Sunitha Krishnan is making it possible for India's government and citizens organizations to manage jointly a range of protective and rehabilitative services for children and women who have been trafficked for commercial sexual exploitation. For her efforts in the anti-trafficking sector she has been awarded Stree Shakthi Puraskar (National Award), Perdita Huston Human Rights Award and the World Of Children Health Award.

Bro Jose Vetticatil was an engineer by training. As a brother belonging to the order of Montfort Brothers of St. Gabriel, Bro Jose was committed to the cause of deprived for 28 years. He was involved in post-earthquake rehabilitation efforts in Latur. His main contribution was in the field of technical training for deprived boys. As the Director of Boys Town, a reputed technical training institute, Bro Jose was instrumental in creating a self-sustaining production-cum-training center. As the erstwhile president of Prajwala, Bro Jose was not only the guiding force behind all interventions but also the master mind behind all the economic rehabilitation programs. After leading Prajwala for over nine years and shaping all its interventions, Bro Jose Vetticatil died on 18 September 2005.

== Awards and recognition ==
Prajwala has received several national and international awards for its outstanding efforts:

- In April, 2008, Prajwala won the prestigious AGFUND International Award for its pioneering work to Combat Trafficking of Women and Children through Community Partnership.
- Prajwala received the National Award for Child Welfare from the Govt. of India in February, 2009 for the exceptional services it renders to prevent child trafficking and its outstanding efforts to rescue and rehabilitate child victims of sex trafficking.
- Edelgive Foundation, the philanthropic arm of Edelweiss Capital, conferred the EdelGive Social Innovation Award to Prajwala in 2011 for its path-breaking work on economic security and livelihoods of victims of trafficking.

Based on her courageous and tireless work as an anti-trafficking crusader, Prajwala's founder Ms. Sunitha Krishnan has also received numerous accolades and honors including Real Heroes Award from Reliance Foundation and CNN-IBN (2008), Trafficking in Persons (TIP) Report Heroes from US Department of State (2009), John Jay College of Criminal Justice Awards (2011), Vanitha Woman of the Year Award (2011), Living Legends Award from Human Symphony Foundation (2013), Godfrey Phillips National Bravery Award 2013, and People of the Year award from Limca Book of Records, 2014.

== See also ==
- Prostitution in India
- Prostitution in Asia
- Prostitution in Kolkata
- Prostitution in Mumbai
- World Charter for Prostitutes' Rights
- Durbar Mahila Samanwaya Committee
- All Bengal Women's Union
- Sonagachi
- Kamathipura
- Garstin Bastion Road, New Delhi
- Male prostitution
