= Sanlaap =

Indian feminist non-governmental organization

Sanlaap is an Indian feminist non-governmental organisation, established by Indrani Sinha in 1987 in Calcutta. Based in Calcutta, the group aims to protect the human rights of women and girls. Sanlaap is a developmental organisation that works towards correction of social imbalances which present themselves as gender injustice and violence against women and children. The primary work is focused against trafficking of women and children for commercial sexual exploitation, sexual abuse and forced prostitution. As part of its work, the group starts shops to train girls to make a living and foster their independence.

== History ==
In 1987 a group of researchers and teachers decided to work for the rights of women and female children. In 1989–90, a study of sexually abused females in Calcutta and its suburbs revealed that girls who were sexually abused when they came in search of work as domestic help and in other forms of employment, often ended up in red light areas. The plight of girls who had been trafficked, tricked and forced into child prostitution became the focus of Sanlaap's work.

Interacting with women in prostitution (WIP) revealed the need of these women to find a safe place for their children while they were busy during evening hours. The idea of a Drop in Centre (DIC) came out as a need expressed by the women in prostitution. Today, Sanlaap runs 14 DICs (drop in centres) in 11 red light districts of Kolkata and its outskirts under its Education Programme (SOPAN).

Mothers in the red light areas of Kolkata voiced concerns that their girls in the age group 12–13 years drop out of schools and get married, and are eventually deserted by husband, often left with a child. They then join the women in prostitution for survival. The women living there also explained how they were trafficked by their husbands, families and friends using the false leads of marriage and employment. They wanted their female children to be safe and out of prostitution and the sex industry.

The idea of a shelter home evolved through this experience, and the first shelter home was started in July 1993. There are three—SNEHA ("Affection")—Shelter Homes in Kolkata and the two districts which house more than 150 girls who are minors rescued from prostitution, children of women in prostitution and vulnerable girls rescued from sexual abuse. Mental Health Intervention Programme through Counselling (1995–96), Vocational skills leading to production (SRIJONI) and economic empowerment, dance as therapy (SANVED), formal and non-formal education are some major interventions and projects of the organisation.

Networking is seen as an integral part of Sanlaap Activities; it is believed that Human Rights of individuals or groups cannot be achieved and trafficking cannot be stopped unless and until all groups network with each other and protest the violence of trafficking and forced prostitution, where major victims are under 18 years of age. Sanlaap also networks with the different Government structures and the Panchayats stop trafficking of children and women.

Sanlaap believes that trafficking and forced prostitution is organised crime and prostitution cannot become work in the South Asian Region. Women and children discriminated by the family and society are bought and sold as commodities in this region and although there are legal bans on traditional and religious prostitution, the implementation has been very weak and female children are forced into brothel prostitution. Natural calamities, political disturbances and civil wars force hundreds of women and girls to take to the streets and many are trafficked for prostitution and dangerous bonded labor practices in the South Asian Countries. Female children and women are often uneducated and unemployed, hence undergoing discrimination at all levels. As a consequence they have vulnerabilities which force them to migrate and many are trafficked during this time. Corruption is rampant at every level and if prostitution is accepted as work, the madam-pimp-brothel owner-trafficker nexus will be strengthened and more girls will find their way into forced prostitution. The demand age for prostitution is the age of sixteen.

The core of Sanlaap's campaign against trafficking in women and girls for the purpose of commercial sexual exploitation is to provide psychosocial rehabilitation of child victims of prostitution, whether they or their mothers are engaged in it. Interventions in Calcutta's red light areas are aimed at building access to communities where prostitutes live and providing services to such women and their children to ensure their access to education, health and protection from abuse and exploitation.

Sanlaap runs two homes for children rescued from, or vulnerable to, prostitution, a hostel for young working women, and a receiving centre for girls rescued from prostitution. The organisation also works with the Panchayats in source areas for trafficking, developing systems and mechanisms to protect vulnerable women and children from being trafficked and to ensure safe passage for those migrating in search of work or because of marriage. Sneha is a home for girls rescued from prostitution, and the female children of women engaged in prostitution who may be vulnerable to second-generation prostitution. The home aims to allow the girls to assess their situation while also dealing with various health issues.

The youth programme's peer support groups among the children of women in prostitution continue to meet regularly. The Kidderpore group has formed a working relationship with the local police to identify trafficked girls and older women who force children into prostitution. Sanlaap intends to support this group further so that its members can take control of situations as they arise in their area.

The success of Sanlaap's legal counselling centre at the Watgunge police station in Calcutta has increased demand for similar services at other police stations. Sanlaap continues to agitate for reform within the juvenile justice board. It has joined a network that aims to set minimum standards for quality of care in institutions for children. Sanlaap's legal aid wing also continues to pursue the speedy disposal of legal cases involving girls living under state custody.

== AIDS ==
More than 19% of the girls rescued from brothel prostitution living in Sneha Shelters are HIV positive, discarded by their families and the Government Homes. Some have given birth to children at the age of fourteen and fifteen.

== Legal Aid ==
SALAH ("advice"), the Legal Aid Wing was born in 1996 to provide assistance in cases of domestic violence, maintenance, child custody and women's rights for all women (except property and tenancy disputes). The focus in 1999 shifted to Campaign and Advocacy initially in the source areas. The Campaign and Advocacy (SAHAYOG) sets up Child Protection Units (CPUs), works towards safe migration and networks with Community Based Organisations in the source areas. From 1998, Sanlaap began working with the Panchayat and the District Administration, Police and he Border Security Force, sensitising them and motivating them into taking measures for protection of children and women vulnerable to trafficking and ensuring safe migration. Economic rehabilitation of survivors of trafficking has special importance today where Sanlaap works in collaboration with the Private and the Public sector.

== SUNDAR ==
SUNDAR was initiated in 2000 as a support group for Women in Prostitution to address the problems of WIP in the red-light areas. The women are supported to attain their identity in the form of voters’ identity card and ration card and are also supported to live a life with dignity without being abused and exploited by local hoodlums, pimps, customers, police and their live-in boyfriends or husbands.

== See also ==
- Prostitution in India
- Prostitution in Asia
- Prostitution in Kolkata
- Prostitution in Mumbai
- World Charter for Prostitutes' Rights
- Durbar Mahila Samanwaya Committee
- All Bengal Women's Union
- Sonagachi
- Kamathipura
- Garstin Bastion Road, New Delhi
- Male prostitution
