= Meergunj =

- Neighborhood of Allahabad
- Country: India
- State: Uttar Pradesh
- City: Allahabad

Government
  - Body: Allahabad Municipal Corporation

Meergunj or Meerganj is a red-light area in Allahabad, Uttar Pradesh.

The area is known for sex trafficking, involvement of gangsters and violence.

In 2016, social worker Sunil Chowdhaty filed a petition in the Allahabad High Court to have the red-light district closed and the trade moved to the city outskirts. The Court ruled in favor of the petition. However, most of the sex workers returned to the area.

== See also ==
- Prostitution in India
- Prostitution in Asia
- Prostitution in Kolkata
- Prostitution in Mumbai
- All Bengal Women's Union
- Durbar Mahila Samanwaya Committee
- Sonagachi
- Male prostitution
