= Shivdaspur =

Coordinates: 29°46′01″N 77°29′23″E

- Census town
- Interactive map of Shivdaspur
- Country: India
- State: Uttar Pradesh
- District: Varanasi

Population (2001)
  - Total: 11,432

Languages
  - Official: Hindi
- Time zone: UTC+5:30 (IST)
- Vehicle registration: UP
- Website: up.gov.in

Shivdaspur is a census town and a red light district in Varanasi in eastern Uttar Pradesh in India. It resides on periphery of Varanasi city, surrounded by Lahartara, Manduadih.

== Demographics ==
As of the 2001 Census of India, Shivdaspur had a population of 11,432. Males constitute 54% of the population and females 46%. Shivdaspur has an average literacy rate of 59%, lower than the national average of 59.5%: male literacy is 68%, and female literacy is 48%.14% of the population is under 6 years of age.

== Red-light district ==
In the 1970s the red-light district in Dalamandi, near the Kashi Vishwanath Temple, was closed and the sex-workers moved to Shivdaspur. The area has declined as the number of customers has fallen, partly because the fear of HIV. There have been calls from locals and politicians for the area to be closed.

== See also ==
- Prostitution in India
- Prostitution in Asia
- Prostitution in Kolkata
- Prostitution in Mumbai
- Sonagachi
- All Bengal Women's Union
- Durbar Mahila Samanwaya Committee
- Male prostitution
