= Budhwar Peth, Pune =

Budhwar Peth
- Suburb
- Location in Maharashtra, India
- Coordinates: 18.517°N 73.858°E
- Country: India
- State: Maharashtra
- District: Pune

Languages
  - Official: Marathi
- Time zone: UTC+5:30 (IST)
- PIN: 411 002
- Telephone code: 91(020)
- Vehicle registration: MH 12

Budhwar Peth is one of many commercial localities in the old city of Pune, India. The area is located in the heart of the city has a high number of electronics shops, and is known for its red-light district. Three out of the five important Ganesh Mandals (Mana che Ganpati) i.e. Jogeshwari Ganpati, Guruji Talim Mandal, Tulshibaug Ganpati are located here, as is Appa Balwant Chowk, known as ABC.

== History ==
For some period, Pune was ruled by the Mughal emperor Aurangzeb in mid to late 1600s. When Aurangzeb attacked Pune, he camped Budhwar Peth in 1660. During Mughal rule, this Peth was known as Mohitabad or Moheyabad. Peshwa Madhavrao I (1761–1773) renamed it as Budhwar Peth. Tulshibaug, Belbaugh and the Jogeshwari temple are some of the historical landmarks of Budhwar peth from the Peshwa era.

The Bhide Wada, located near Limbraj Maharaj Temple hosted the first school for girls in Maharashtra. The school was started by Savitribai and Jyotiba Phule in January 1848.

== Economy ==
Budhwar Peth is a business area particularly for electrical goods market, books and traditional items. Places of interest include; Tambdi Jogeshwari Temple, N.M.V High School, part of Laxmi Road, the main shopping area of inner Pune, Appa Balwant Chowk and Dagadusheth Halwai Ganapati temple, which is believed to be the richest amongst all Ganesh Temples with the Lord Ganesha icon laden with several | of rupees of gold.

== Red-light district ==
Budhwar Peth houses India's third largest red-light district. It has been estimated to contain about 700 brothels and 5,000 prostitutes. The area suffers from sex trafficking, child prostitution and police corruption. HIV was formerly a large problem, but an HIV/AIDS programme, including education and condom distribution has resulted in a considerably reduced HIV prevalence.

== See also ==
- Prostitution in India
- Prostitution in Asia
- Prostitution in Mumbai
- Sonagachi
- Durbar Mahila Samanwaya Committee
