= DMSC =

DMSC may refer to:

- Doctor of Medical Science, a professional doctorate for physician assistants (postnominals DMSc or DMS)
- Doctor of Medical Science (Danish and Norwegian degree), a post-doctoral degree (postnominals DMSc)
- Durbar Mahila Samanwaya Committee, a nonprofit organization in India
