= Nobody Can Love You More =

Book by Mayank Austen Soofi

Nobody Can Love You More: Life in Delhi's Red Light District
- First edition
- Author: Mayank Austen Soofi
- Language: English
- Subject: Prostitution in India
- Publisher: Penguin Books India
- Publication date: 2012
- Publication place: India
- Pages: 240
- ISBN: 9780143422723

Nobody Can Love You More: Life in Delhi's Red Light District is a 2012 book by the Indian writer and photojournalist Mayank Austen Soofi.

== Synopsis ==
The book follows the daily lives of sex workers living on G.B. Road, New Delhi, a large red-light district in India's capital as they "raise their children, cook for their lovers, visit temples, shrines and mosques, complain about pimps and brothel owners, listen to film songs, and solicit and entertain customers". The book seeks to paint a portrait of women for whom sex is a way to make a living. The book contains photography described by the publishers as "haunting"

== Reception ==
In The Times of India Arunima Mazumdar wrote that the book "is a perspective of a neighbourhood distanced from the accepted societal norms. It is a reminder and a comprehensive understanding of the extraordinary lives of ordinary people"

In the Sunday Guardian Annie Zaidi describes the book as "gently sympathetic" but criticises some elements of the writing style. Overall, Zaidi notes that "As a reminder of their humanity and their vulnerability, Soofi's book is worth a read"
