= Garstin Bastion Road, New Delhi =

G. B. Road Swami Shradhanand Marg
- neighbourhood
- Location within Delhi
- Coordinates: 28°38′51″N 77°13′22″E
- Country: India
- State: Delhi

Garstin Bastion Road, also called G.B. Road (officially renamed Swami Shradhanand Marg in 1966) is a road running from Ajmeri Gate to Lahori Gate in Delhi, India. It is the city's main red-light district. There are several hundred multi-storey brothels on the street, and there are estimated to be over 1,000 sex workers.

== History ==
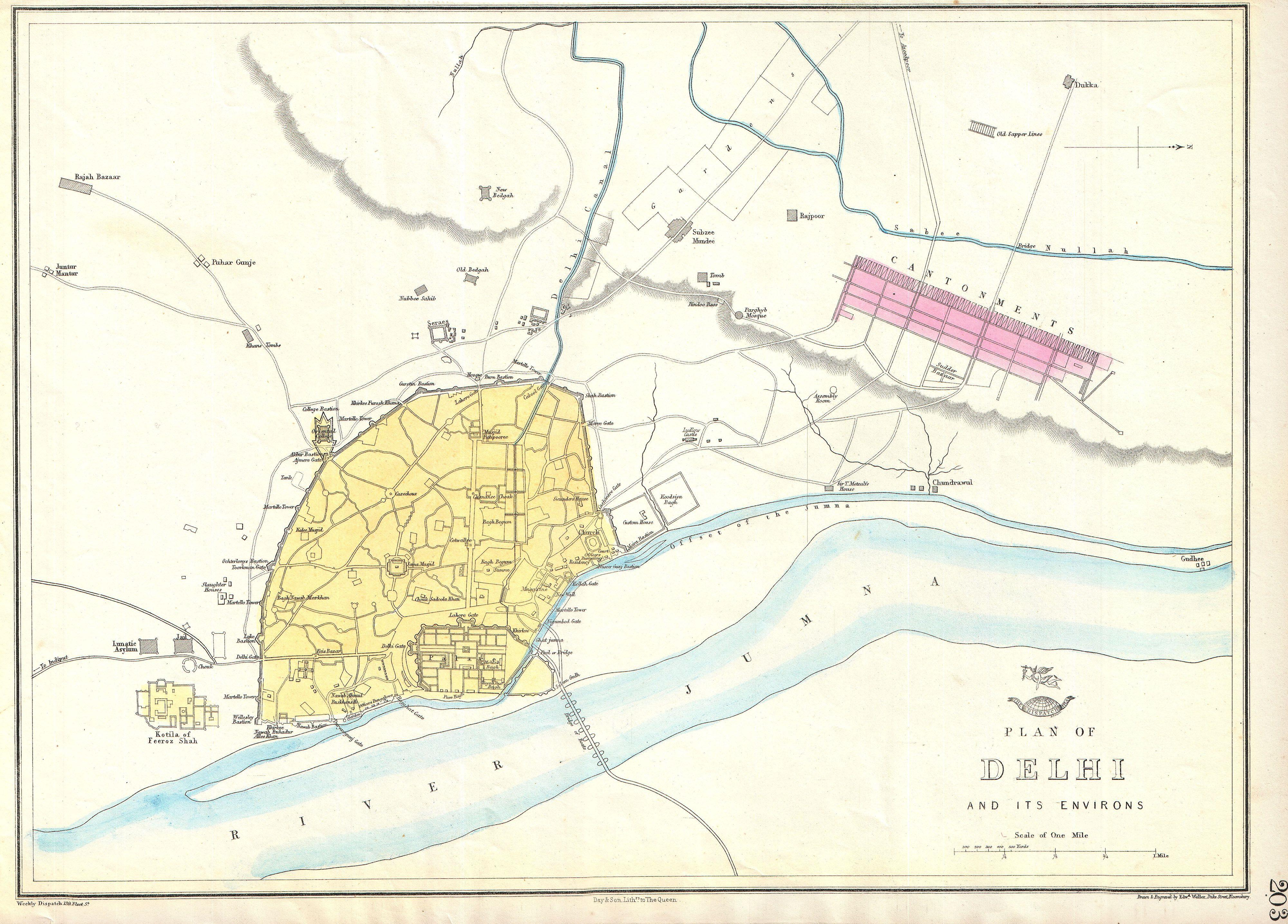
1863 map of Delhi. Garstin Bastion was located on the western part of the city walls

The old city of Delhi, Shahjahanabad, was surrounded by a wall. The wall had many gates and bastions. A bastion is an angular structure projecting outward from the curtain wall of an artillery fortification. It is called burj in Arabic and Urdu. One such burj or bastion was named after a British officer of the East India Company. The history of G.B. Road can be dated back to the Mughal era. It is said that there were five red light areas or kothas (brothels) in Delhi at that time. Then came the British Raj, when a British commissioner named Garstin consolidated all the five kothas in one area on this road. The road has about 100 brothels now. G.B Road has one of the few red-light areas in India apart from Kamathipura (Mumbai), Sonagachi (Kolkata) and Chaturbhuj Sthan (Muzaffarpur). The place also contains thousands of prostitution rooms or kothas.

== Market ==
The road is famous as a market for machinery, automobile parts, hardware and tools and is the largest market for these items in the National Capital Region. The road is crowded with vehicles and persons during the day as it is a commercial area.

The segment of the road starting from the Ajmeri Gate in the south until the small intersection with a street leading up to Farash Khana in the north has shops on the ground floor and kothas or brothels on the first and second floors.

The streets and houses at the back of the road are residential areas.

== Crime ==
At night, the road is a dangerous place for the uninitiated. Mugging, snatching of wallets, watches and phones and other crimes happen quite often. A policeman on duty was stabbed to death by muggers just after midnight in September 2012 when a posse of policemen tried to save a man from a gang of criminals who had waylaid him on the road and stabbed him while he was going home from work.

== See also ==
- Prostitution in India
- Prostitution in Asia
- Prostitution in Kolkata
- Prostitution in Mumbai
- All Bengal Women's Union
- Durbar Mahila Samanwaya Committee
- Male prostitution

== Bibliography ==
- Soofi, Mayank Austen (2013). Nobody Can Love You More: Life in Delhi's Red Light District. Penguin Group. ISBN 978-0-670-08414-2.
