= Appa Balwant Chowk =

Coordinates: 18.5172026°N 73.8535344°E

Appa Balwant Chowk (also known as A.B.C.) is a popular crossroads in the Shaniwar Peth neighborhood of Pune, India that is particularly noted for the concentration of bookshops in the area. It is also the site of the 15th century Tambdi Jogeshwari temple.

== History ==
The Appa Balwant Chowk was named after Sardar Appa Balwant Mehendale, a commander in the Maratha army. The place began to be known as a venue for booksellers in the late 1950s, following the opening of the first shop by L.N. Godbole.

On August 9, 1942, two people were shot and killed by police at A.B.C. after a teenager raised the Indian flag in defiance of British rule. This triggered anti-colonialist violence, including a theatre bombing, the 75th anniversary of which was marked in January 2018.
