= Dedh galli =

Dedh galli, also spelt Dedh gully, is a street market in Mumbai. It means one and a half alley. It has been described as one of Mumbai's three Chor Bazars or flea markets primarily for footwear. It is located in the Kamathipura area of the city, behind Alexander cinema. The market functions between 4 am to 8 am, on Friday and Sunday.
