= Kamathis =

Kamathis are a group of people from Mumbai, India who had migrated to the city from the Indian state of Hyderabad state. In 1795, the Maratha army defeated the Nizam of Hyderabad. Following this, many artisans and construction workers from Telangana migrated to Bombay and settled into the flats which were made livable by the construction of the Hornby Vellard. These workers were called Kamathis, and their enclave was called Kamathipura.
