= Mayank Austen Soofi =

Indian writer and photojournalist

- Occupations: Writer, blogger, and photojournalist
- Known for: Delhiwale
- Website: www.thedelhiwalla.com

Mayank Austen Soofi is a Delhi-based Indian writer, blogger and photojournalist, who writes columns for Hindustan Times and Mint on culture, food and literary landscapes of Delhi.

He is best known for his website and blog, Delhiwale, a multifaceted guide of the city, that has been praised as being "the most compelling guide to India's capital" by The Independent and "a one-man encyclopedia of the city" by Time Out Delhi.

== Biography ==
Soofi was born in Nainital, Uttarakhand and moved to Delhi around 2004. He uses 'Austen' as his middle name as a tribute to the author Jane Austen, about whom he often blogs. His writings were featured in Volume 4 of "Penguin Book of New Writing from India" published by Penguin.

In 2011, he published four alternative guidebooks to the city of Delhi: The Delhi Walla - Portraits, Delhi Food, Delhi Hangouts and Delhi Monuments. His latest book Nobody Can Love You More, published in 2012 by Penguin Books, deals with the life of a 'kotha', Hindi for brothel, in Delhi's largest red-light district, G. B. Road, which is home to 5,000 sex workers.

He also writes columns on Delhi in the city supplement of Hindustan Times titled "The Delhiwalla", Soofi also writes a column, "Delhi's Belly", for the weekend supplement of the business newspaper Mint.

He has initiated many projects, including Mission Delhi, which aims to profile 1% of Delhi's 14 million people, and a blog dedicated to Arundhati Roy's debut novel, The God of Small Things, and to its readers. He recently started a reading club called The Delhi Proustians, which centers around the French novelist Marcel Proust and his seven volume novel, In Search of Lost Time.

== Works ==
- The Delhi Walla: Delhi Monuments – HarperCollins, 2011. (ISBN 978-9-350-29005-7)
- The Delhi Walla: Delhi Hangouts – HarperCollins, 2011. (ISBN 978-9-350-29006-4)
- The Delhi Walla: Delhi Food+Drink – HarperCollins, 2011. (ISBN 978-9-350-29004-0)
- The Delhi Walla: Portraits – HarperCollins, 2011. (ISBN 978-9-350-29064-4)
- Nobody Can Love You More – Penguin Books, 2012. (ISBN 978-0-670-08414-2)
