= Smarajit Jana =

Indian health scientist (died 2021)

Smarajit Jana (21 July 1952 to 8 May 2021) was a public health scientist of the All India Institute of Hygiene and Public Health, Kolkata. He is notable for his work for the rights of sex workers in Sonagachi. He was an epidemiologist and member of the Indian National Task Force on COVID-19, which later infected him, leading to his death.

== Early life and education ==
Jana was a medical doctor and completed his MBBS in 1978 from Calcutta University. He completed his post graduate course on Tropical Medicine and Health from STM, Calcutta between 1981 and 82. He also did his M.D. in Social and Preventive Medicine at AIIH & PH, Calcutta University. He also did courses in epidemiology and health system development in School of Hygiene and Public Health, the Johns Hopkins University, Baltimore, USA, AIDS Education and Training Center, The University of Washington, Seattle, USA. and Dept. of Public Health, Leeds University, United Kingdom. His married Madhulina and has a daughter, Samaita, and son, Sambit.

== Career ==
He is the founder of SHIP, an organisation to prevent HIV and collectivise women in Sex Work. He also played a great role in starting the National Network of Sex Workers and later after he was disillusioned withe same and was instrumental in starting the second National organisation for Sex Workers, the All India Network of Sex Workers (AINSW). He died on 8 May 2020 due to Corona. In 1992, as a researcher at the All India Institute of Hygiene and Public Health he worked on the Sonagachi Project. Later, he is also one of the founders of Durbar Mahila Samanwaya Committee (DMSC), a sex workers collective which presently has over 65,000 members. Working with CARE Bangladesh from 1999 to 2003, he helped HIV interventions among sex workers and people who inject drug. Later, he came back to India and served CARE India as Assistant Country Director.

== Awards ==
- In 1999, Jana received the National Public Service Excellence Award for Innovation in HIV Interventions by Government of India.
