= Prabha Kotiswaran =

Professor of law and social justice

Prabha Kotiswaran is a professor of law and social justice working at King's College London (KCL) in the United Kingdom.

== Career ==
Professor Prabha obtained her undergraduate degree from the National Law School of India University, and a doctorate degree from Harvard University, USA. She later practised law at Debevoise and Plimpton, two eminent law firms in New York, USA. She was a lecturer at the School of Oriental and African Studies at the University of London. She joined KCL in 2012.

== Research & teaching ==
Prabha teaches undergraduate and postgraduate courses at the KCL. These include, but not limited to, Criminal Law, Jurisprudence, and Law & Social Theory. Professor Kotiswaran has published over 35 research papers and many books. She published her first research paper in 2001 titled "Preparing for Civil Disobedience: Indian Sex Workers and the Law."

== Selected books ==
- Dangerous Sex, Invisible Labor: Sex Work and the Law in India
- Governance Feminism: An Introduction
- Sex Work
- Towards an Economic Sociology of Law
- Revisiting the Law and Governance of Trafficking, Forced Labor and Modern Slavery
- Governance Feminism: Notes from the Field

== Awards ==
- 2011: SLSA-Hart Book Prize for Early Career Academics.
- 2014: Leverhulme Prize.
