= Sonagachi =

- Neighbourhood in Kolkata (Calcutta)
- Location in Kolkata
- Coordinates: 22°59′39″N 88°36′44″E
- Country: India
- State: West Bengal
- City: Kolkata
- Founder: East India Company
- Named for: বেশ্যালয়
- Elevation: 11 m (36 ft)

Sonagachi is a neighbourhood in Kolkata, India, located in North Kolkata near the intersection of Jatindra Mohan Avenue (north of C.R. Avenue) with Beadon Street and Sovabazar, about one kilometer north of the Marble Palace area. Sonagachi is among the largest red-light districts in Asia and the world with several hundred multi-storey brothels accommodating more than 16,000 commercial sex workers.

== Etymology ==
In Bengali, Sona Gachi means 'Tree of Gold'. According to legend, during the early days of Calcutta the area was the den of a notorious dacoit by the name of Sanaullah, who lived here with his mother. On his death, the grieving woman is said to have heard a voice coming from their hut, saying, "Mother, don't cry. I have become a Gazi", and so the legend of Sona Gazi started. The mother built a mosque in memory of her son, although it fell into disrepair. The Sona Gazi was converted into Sonagachi.

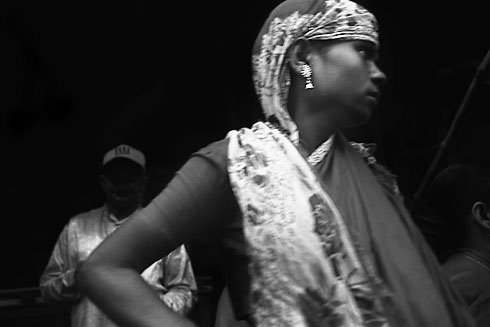
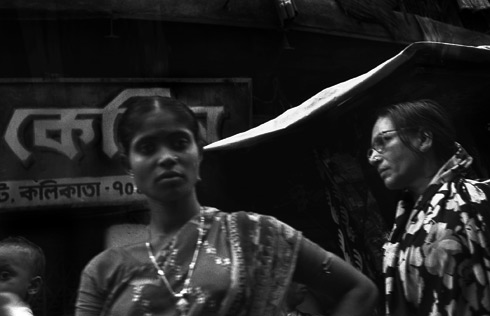
A scene in Sonagachi, Kolkata's red light district, 2005.

== Red-light district ==
=== Current situation ===
Several NGOs and government organizations operate in Sonagachi for the prevention of sexually transmitted diseases (STD) including AIDS. The book Guilty Without Trial by the founders of the NGO Sanlaap based much of their research into human trafficking in India on this area.

The Sonagachi project is a sex workers' cooperative that operates in the area and empowers sex workers to insist on condom use and to stand up against abuse. Run by the Durbar Mahila Samanwaya Committee, it was founded by public health scientist Smarajit Jana in 1992 but is now largely run by the prostitutes themselves. While some are crediting the DMSC with keeping a relatively low rate of HIV infection among prostitutes, around 5.17% of the 13,000 prostitutes in Sonagachi are estimated to be HIV positive. This rate is close to the average HIV rate for female prostitutes in India, which is estimated to be 5.1%, though the HIV infection rate among prostitutes as well as among the general population varies widely by region in India. According to some sources, prostitutes from Sonagachi who test HIV positive are not told about the results, and live with the disease without knowing about it "because the DMSC is worried that HIV positive women will be ostracized." Some prostitutes in Sonagachi have stated that "the clients, at least three quarters of them" refuse to use condoms and "if we force them to use the condom, they will just go next door. There are so many women working here, and in the end, everyone is prepared to work without protection for fear of losing trade."

Besides the Sonagachi project, the DMSC also runs several similar projects in West Bengal, organizing some 65,000 prostitutes and their children. The organization lobbies for the recognition of sex workers' rights and full legalization, runs literacy and vocational programs, and provides micro loans. The DMSC hosted India's first national convention of sex workers on 14 November 1997 in Kolkata, titled 'Sex Work is Real Work: We Demand Workers Rights'. The book Half the Sky: Turning Oppression into Opportunity for Women Worldwide reports investigations revealing that, contrary to stated policy, the DMSC allows sex slavery, sex trafficking, and underage girls in Sonagachi project brothels.

== Popular culture ==
The documentary Born into Brothels: Calcutta's Red Light Kids won the Oscar for best documentary award in 2005. It depicts the lives of children born to prostitutes in Sonagachi. Born into Brothels takes the viewer beyond the well-known prostitute-clogged streets and into the homes of the children who live in the so-called worst place on earth. If the film has one success story, it is the discovery of ten-year-old Avijit whose natural affinity for creating exciting compositions through the lens earned him an invitation to the World Press Photo Foundation in Amsterdam.

Sahir Ludhianavi wrote

Ye duniya do rangi hai

Ek taraf se resham ode, ek taraf se nangi hai

Ek taraf andhi daulat ki paagal aish parasti

Ek taraf jismoñ ki qeemat roti se bhi sasti

Ek taraf hai Sonaagaachi, ek taraf Chaurangi hai

Ye duniya do rangi hai

Meaning:

This world is double-faced

One side covered with silk, the other naked

On the one hand, the hedonism of blind wealth

On the other, bodies sold cheaper than bread

On the one hand lies Sonagachi, on the other Chowringhee

This world is double-faced

There is also a documentary titled Tales of The Night Fairies by Prof. Shohini Ghosh and Dr. Sabeena Ghadioke from Asia's leading Media institute AJK, Mass Communication Research Centre, about the Sonagachi area. It has won the Jeevika Award for the best documentary feature on livelihood in India.

Popular actor Kamal Haasan's movie Mahanadhi has a storyline based on the area. The Malayalam Film Calcutta News depicts the story of women being trafficked and forced to become sex workers in Sonagachi.

In his documentary The Five Obstructions, renowned Danish filmmaker Lars von Trier asks poet and experimental filmmaker Jorgen Leth to name the worst place in the world he has ever visited, and immediately Leth responds with "The Red Light District of Calcutta."

== See also ==
- Prostitution in India
- Prostitution in Asia
- Prostitution in Kolkata
- Prostitution in Mumbai
- All Bengal Women's Union
- Durbar Mahila Samanwaya Committee
- Kamathipura
- Garstin Bastion Road, New Delhi
- Budhwar Peth, Pune
- Male prostitution
