= Calcutta News (film) =

- Directed by: Blessy
- Written by: Blessy
- Produced by: Thampi Antony
- Starring: Dileep; Indrajith Sukumaran; Meera Jasmine; Vimala Raman; Innocent
- Cinematography: S. Kumar
- Music by: Debojyoti Mishra
- Production company: Kayal Films
- Distributed by: Century Pictures
- Release date: 25 January 2008
- Running time: 150 minutes
- Country: India
- Language: Malayalam

Calcutta News is a 2008 Indian Malayalam language romantic thriller film written and directed by Blessy. The film stars Dileep, Indrajith Sukumaran, Meera Jasmine and Vimala Raman. The music is composed by Debojyoti Mishra. The film deals with the issue of trafficking in women and how an Orphan girl from Kerala gets caught in it. It showcased Blessy's yet another different genre film and successfully provided Dileep with different character unlike his usual comic characters.

== Plot ==
Ajith Thomas is an acclaimed investigative television anchor and producer with a leading channel 'Calcutta News', and is the son of a former footballer who grew up in Kolkata. His team at the channel includes news assistant Smitha, anchors Aruna and Sheela. Ajith is a lovable guy who lives in a flat with his mother and two sisters and is an active member of the Malayalee Samajam led by a comical president and his wife Leela. One day, Ajith bumps into a newly married Malayalee couple while on work in a tram, but the guy is hostile when he tries to introduce himself as a Malayalee. However, while editing the news, he is shocked to find that an unidentified body found near Kalighat resembles the rude guy he met in the tram.

Ajith's investigative nature comes into the fore as he goes about finding the mystery behind the brutal murder of the guy. The guy was Harikumar, who had married an orphan Krishnapriya, from Pattambi and brought her to Kolkata, before his brutal murder. Krishna is unaware of her husband's job or what he does for a living and is shattered to know about his death. However, just before Hari is killed, Krishna had come to known that Hari had only married her with the intention of delivering her, a young virgin, to his boss.

Krishna is both relieved that she is safe from sex racket she almost fell into, as well as desperate and sad because Hari had been the only person she knew or could go to. She couldn't return home and had nowhere to go. She attempts suicide but fails. Hope floats into her life after Ajith sort of becomes her protector and also gets attracted to her for her innocence and their mutual love for music.

Krishna moves in with Aruna and Sheela but cannot forget her past. When she comes across a psychic at Ajith's office she decides to approach him to know the exact cause of Hari's death. The psychic communicates with Hari's spirit and Krishnapriya come to know of who killed Hari. Ajith becomes concerned about Krishna's obsession with the details of Hari's murder and the strange behaviour she exhibits sometimes. He takes the help of a psychologist to help her forget the painful memories, and she begins to live a normal life teaching music to children. The henchmen of the racket are meanwhile on the hunt for her, as they had already paid Hari for a new girl. The one-armed guy who operates from Sonagachi, the largest red-light area in eastern India, looking for Krishna also wants to settle a score with her, as in the fight with Hari to get her, he lost his left hand after Hari hit it with an iron rod. On a tip off, they trace her to the music school and kidnap her. Ajith tries to get the help of the police but they refuse to register a complaint without any proof. He is forced to go Krishna all alone. When he enters the red-light area, Ajith is shocked at the abuse and neglect the women are facing. He begins to record what he sees on his cell phone. The goons there find him inside and beat him up severely. Howevwe, he overpowers them and escapes. He is now trapped deep in the red light area with goons out to kill him. In the lair, his cell phone falls out of his hand and is found by a little girl. The child is fascinated by the video recording going on and follows Ajith everywhere recording whatever happens to him. Eventually when she returns the phone to Ajith, the entire fight has been recorded on it. Ajith transmits it to Smitha and she airs it live along with his plea to rescue the women and himself. Police battalions arrive and free everyone including Ajith and Krishna.

== Cast ==
- Dileep as Ajith Thomas
- Indrajith Sukumaran as Harikumar
- Meera Jasmine as Krishna Priya
- Vimala Raman as Smitha
- Manasa as Aruna
- Binda as Sheela
- Innocent as Samajam President
- Bindu Panicker as Leela
- Chitra Shenoy as Ajith's mother
- Suja Menon as Ajith's sister
- Unni Maya as Ajith's sister
- Kathal Krishnamoorthy

== Soundtrack ==
The soundtrack features 8 tracks composed by Debojyoti Mishra with lyrics penned by Vayalar Sarathchandra Varma and Kamalesh Mukherjee.

Soundtrack Album
#	Song	Singers	Raga
1	"Akaleyoru Chillamele"	K. S. Chithra, Asmitha Sengupta	—
2	"Engu Ninno Vanna"	Madhu Balakrishnan, K. S. Chithra, Debojyoti Mishra	Raagamalika (Kalyani, Desh)
3	"Engu Ninno Vannu [F]"	K. S. Chithra, Debojyoti Mishra	Raagamalika (Kalyani, Desh)
4	"Engu Ninno Vannu [M]"	Madhu Balakrishnan	Raagamalika (Kalyani, Desh)
5	"Kani Kanduvo"	Madhu Balakrishnan, K. S. Chithra	—
6	"Kannaadikkoottile"	K. S. Chithra, Vinitha, Vijitha	—
7	"Nanmayaakunna"	K. S. Chithra	Jog
8	"Tu Chor Bhi"	Sreekanth Acharya	—

== Reception ==
The film is considered as one of the action films by Blessy. The film gained positive reviews from the viewers and the critics praising the performances, the plot and the narration and also the serious subject they have discussed in the film which is currently ongoing in the country. Although the film was a commercial failure at the box office.

== Awards ==
Brinda and K K Vinod received the Kerala State Film Award for Best Choreography.
