= Kamathipura =

Neighbourhood in Mumbai, India

Kamathipura Kamthipura
- Neighbourhood in Mumbai
- Location in Mumbai, India
- Coordinates: 18.96°N 72.82°E
- Country: India
- State: Maharashtra
- Metro: Mumbai
- Established: 1795

Government
  - Type: Municipal Corporation
  - Body: BMC
- Elevation: 4 m (13 ft)

Languages
  - Official: Marathi
- Time zone: UTC+5:30 (IST)
- Postal code: 400008
- Vehicle registration: MH-01

Kamathipura (also spelled Kamthipura) is a neighbourhood in Mumbai, India known for prostitution. It was first settled after 1795 with the construction of causeways that connected the erstwhile seven islands of Mumbai. Initially known as Lal Bazaar, it got its name from the Kamathis (workers) of other areas of the country, who were labourers on sexual sites. Due to tough police crackdowns, in the late 1990s with the rise of AIDS and government's redevelopment policy that helped sex workers to move out of the profession and subsequently out of Kamathipura, the number of sex workers in the area has dwindled. Since then, Kamathipura has experienced gentrification, and as of 2017, Kamathipura had less than 2,000 sex workers. Real estate expansion has pushed the brothels into only two of the 14 lanes which they originally occupied. In 1992, Brihanmumbai Municipal Corporation (BMC) recorded there were 45,000 sex workers, which decreased to 1,600 in 2009 and 500 in 2018. Many sex workers have migrated to other areas in Maharashtra, in part due to real estate developers taking over increasingly valuable land. In 2018, the Maharashtra government sought tenders to demolish and redevelop the area.

== History ==
Former seven islands of Mumbai, before the 17th century

The ground floors open directly onto the road like native shops. In their lower and upper rooms, native women call to male passers-by.

— A visiting Christian missionary in late 19th century

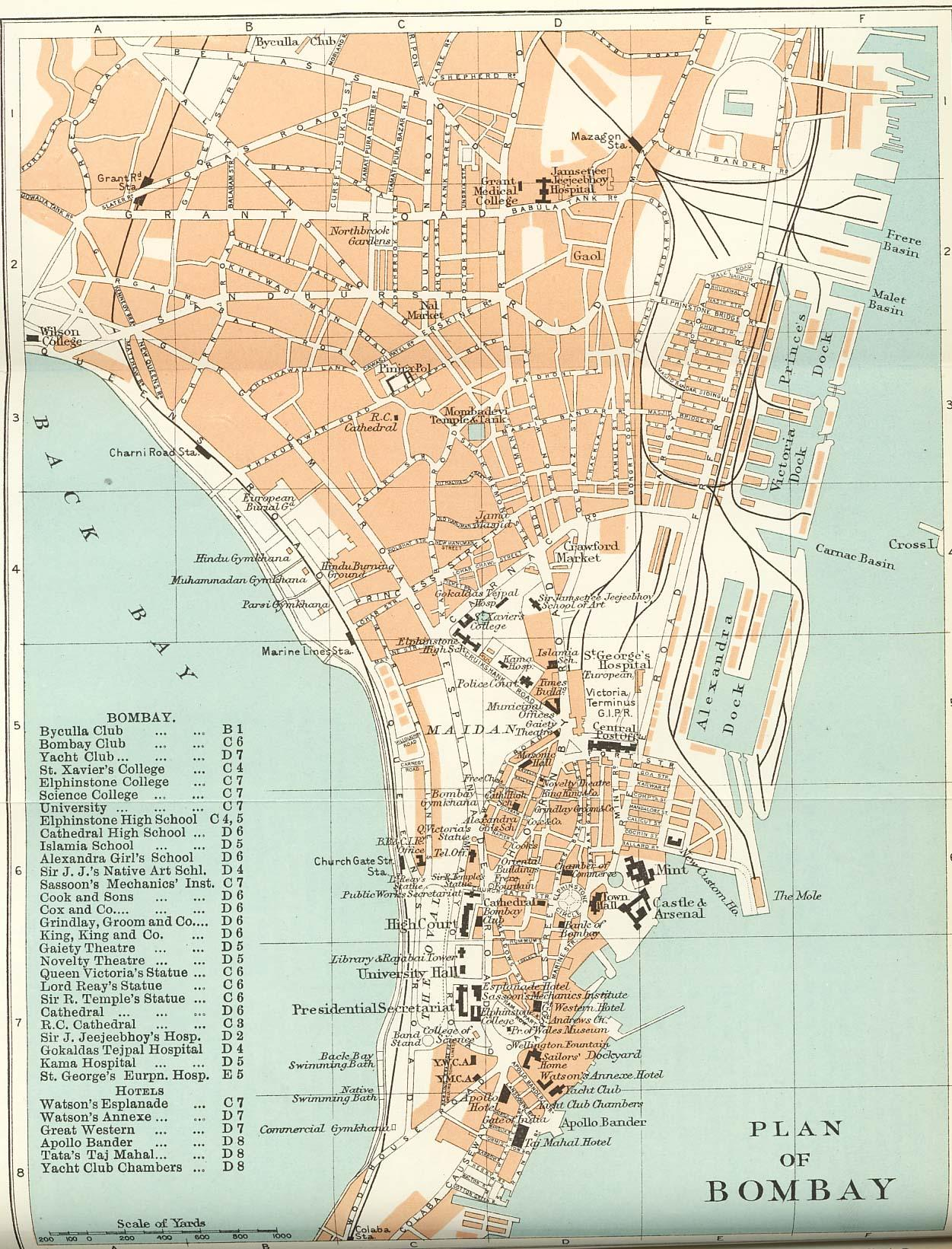
Kamathipura area in map of Mumbai, 1924

The British fortified Mumbai as commerce of the Bombay port flourished. In 1782, the British began the project to unify the islands. Before the completion of the Hornby Vellard project in 1784, which built a causeway uniting all seven islands of Mumbai under William Hornby, governor of Bombay (1771–1784), plugged the Great Breach in Mahalaxmi, while the subsequent Bellasis Road causeway joined Mazagaon and Malabar Hill in 1793. This resulted in several low-lying marshy areas of Mumbai Flats like Byculla, Tardeo, Mahalaxmi and Kamathipura opening up for habitation. Kamathipura emerged in 1795 on the northern periphery of the Fort. Thereafter, starting 1795, Kamathis (workers) of other areas of the country, working as labourers on construction sites began settling here in the flat areas which were rendered liveable due to the construction of the Hornby Vellard and the Bellasis Road, giving the area its present name. It was bounded by Bellasis Road on the north, by Gaodevi on the south and the main road across, Falkland Road. At one point during this period it was home to a Chinese community, which worked as dockhands and ran restaurants. By the late 19th century, it all changed.

Till then, as previous 1864 Census figures for Mumbai indicate, other areas had a larger population of prostitutes, like Girgaon (1,044), Phanaswadi (1,323) and Oomburkharee (1,583) compared with Kamathipura (601), all of which declined after 1864. In the nineteenth century, the area developed in the main red light district of the city of Mumbai. In the words of a visiting missionary, "...the ground floor open to the road, like native shops. In these lower as well as in the upper rooms were native women calling to the male passers-by of various nationalities." Kamathipura became established as one of the "comfort zones" in Mumbai for British soldiers, and this is embedded within the local origin stories. The most well-known brothel in the area, Pila House, is the hybridisation of its original word: Playhouse. The first venereal disease clinic of Bombay was opened in 1916, and was taken over by BMC in 1925. Nearby, Bachchuseth ki Wadi on Foras Road was famous for its kothewalis or tawaifs and mujras.

When India gained independence, a larger number of sex workers moved into the area. In recent decades, large numbers of Nepalese women and girls have also been trafficked into the district. Over the years under Indian government rule, the sex industry in Kamathipura continued to flourish. Trafficking and economic circumstances also brought women from different parts of the country there. Eventually it became Asia's largest sex district.

In the late 1980s, the rise of AIDS was partially responsible for the decline of Kamathipura's sex industry. Police started cracking down on the brothels and customers declined as the disease spread. Many sex workers left for the suburbs or other cities. From around 50,000 sex workers in 1992, the number of sex workers has been reduced to below 2000.

The brothels in the area are crowded. Sex workers wait outside to pick up customers and then rent an available bed. The estimated 3,000 buildings in the area are largely dilapidated; safe drinking water and sanitation are scarce as well.

Some historical sources point out that the origin of slums, subsequently the red-light areas of Mumbai, including Kamathipura, is related to land acquisition from the indigenous population who were evicted from their farmlands and cattle-fields and forced to live in congested conditions, to facilitate the development of the industrial harbour city. In the early stages, people accumulated in the new slums, partly dependent on construction contracts. Later, as men became unemployed due to lack of jobs, more women began to engage in sex work in order to survive. Gang activity also increased in the area; in the 1970s and early '80s, Bachchu Wadi at Kamathipura was frequented by gangleaders from the Mumbai underworld, such as Haji Mastan, Karim Lala, and Dawood Ibrahim.

The 2005 statewide ban on dance bars resulted in many former female dancers resorting to prostitution in Mumbai's red-light districts in order to survive. According to police, in 2005, there were 100,000 prostitutes working out of five-star hotels and brothels across Mumbai.

The area is also home to a small cottage industry of about 200 women who make a living rolling beedis (hand-rolled Indian cigarettes).

== Demographics ==
Kamathipura is divided into roughly 14 lanes and divided according to regional backgrounds of the workers. Most of the workers come from other Indian states. There is little interaction between areas, which makes it harder for social organizations to organize them into a movement or union. Further, lack of public opinion, political leadership or social activism which is empathetic towards them means a tough time forming unions.

The area had 55,936 voters in 2007.

== Image gallery ==
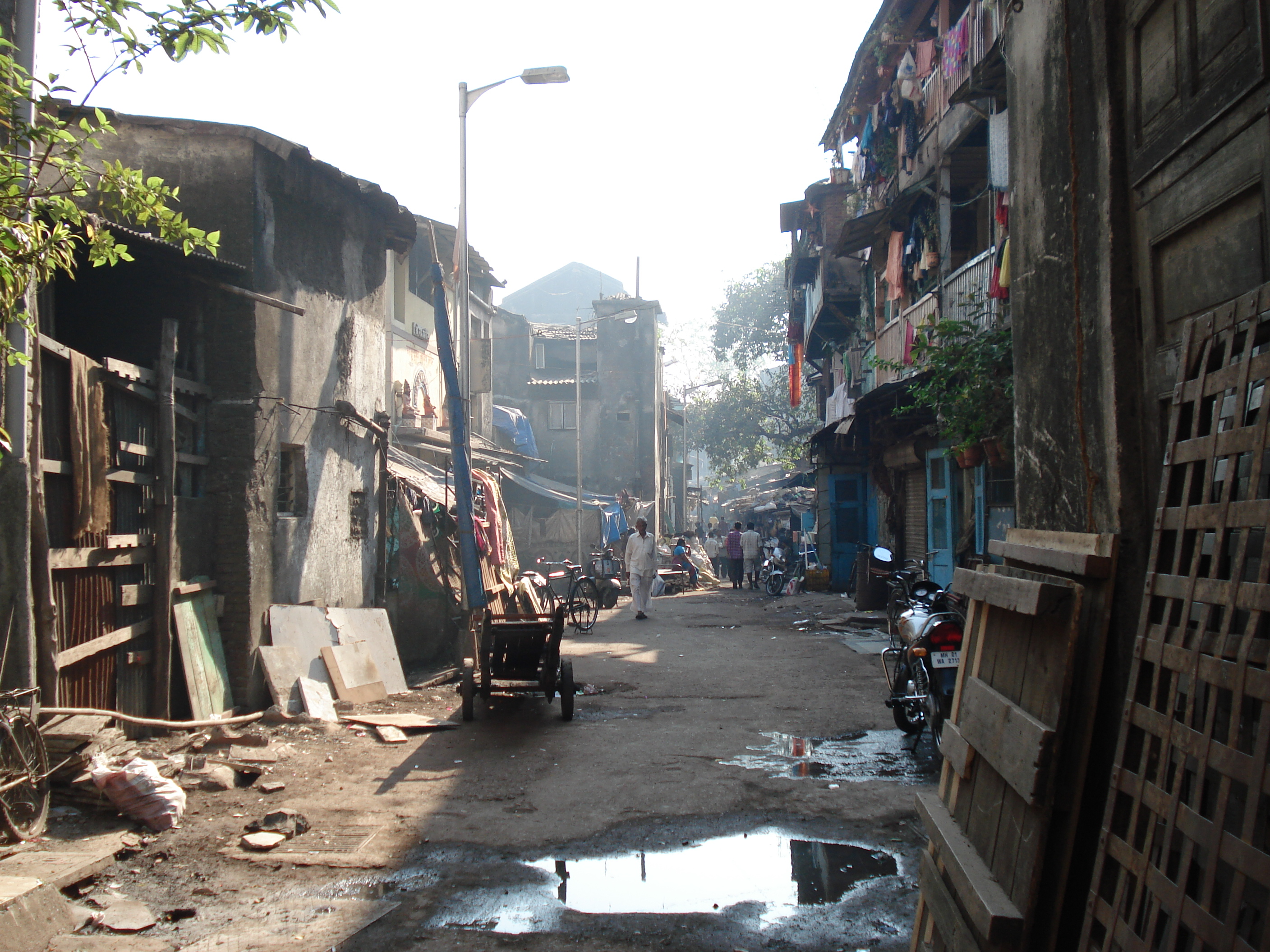

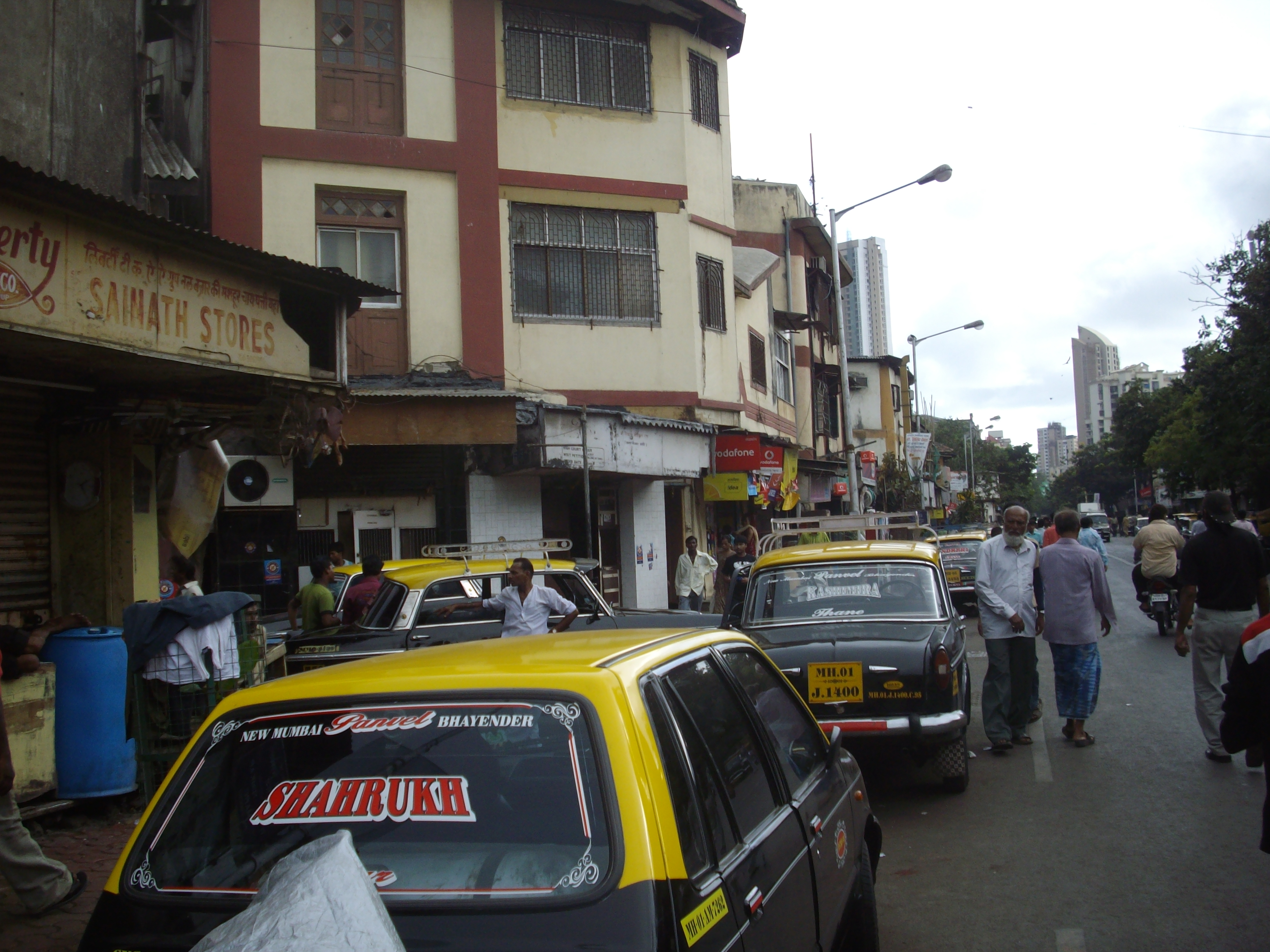

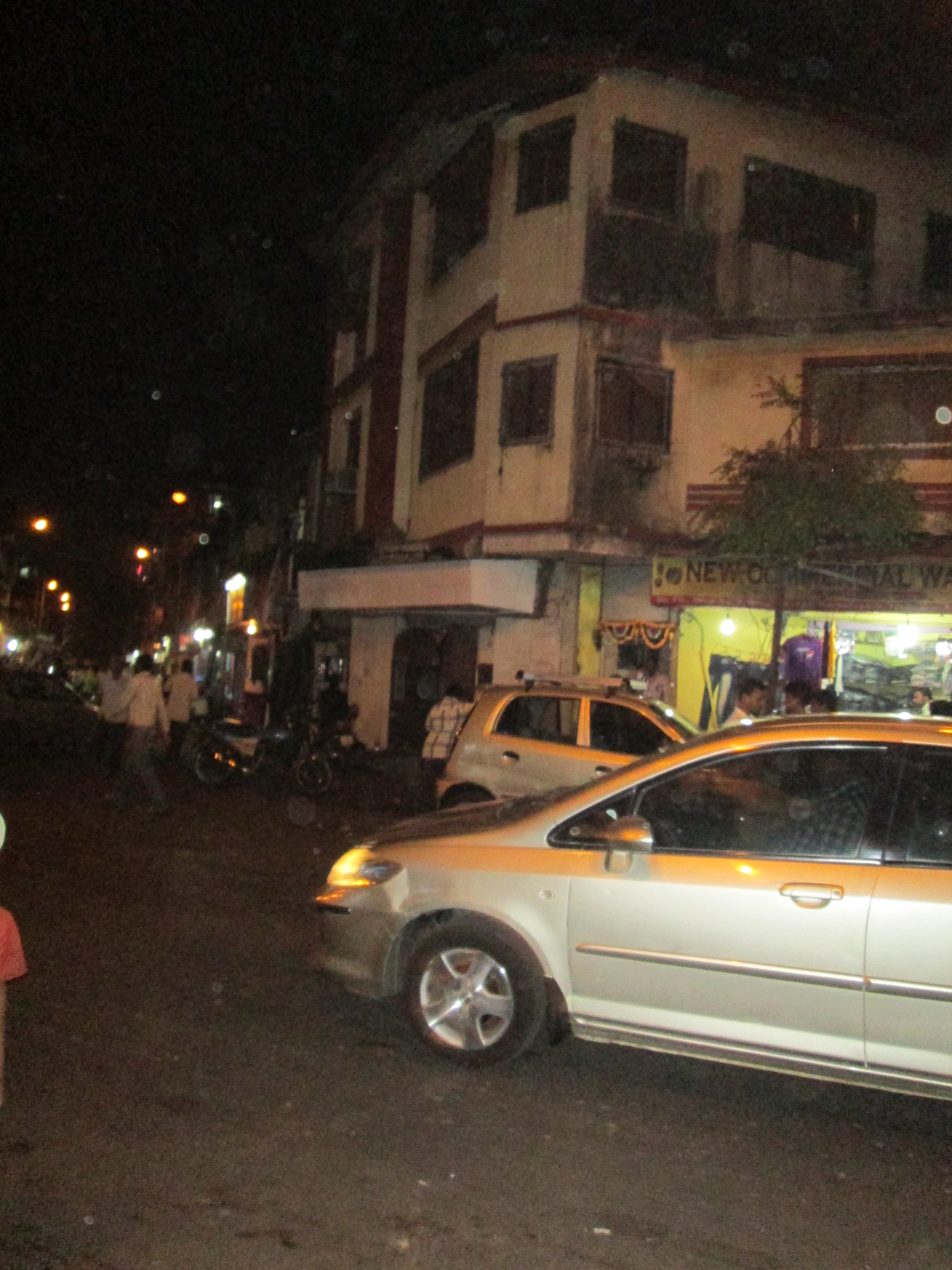

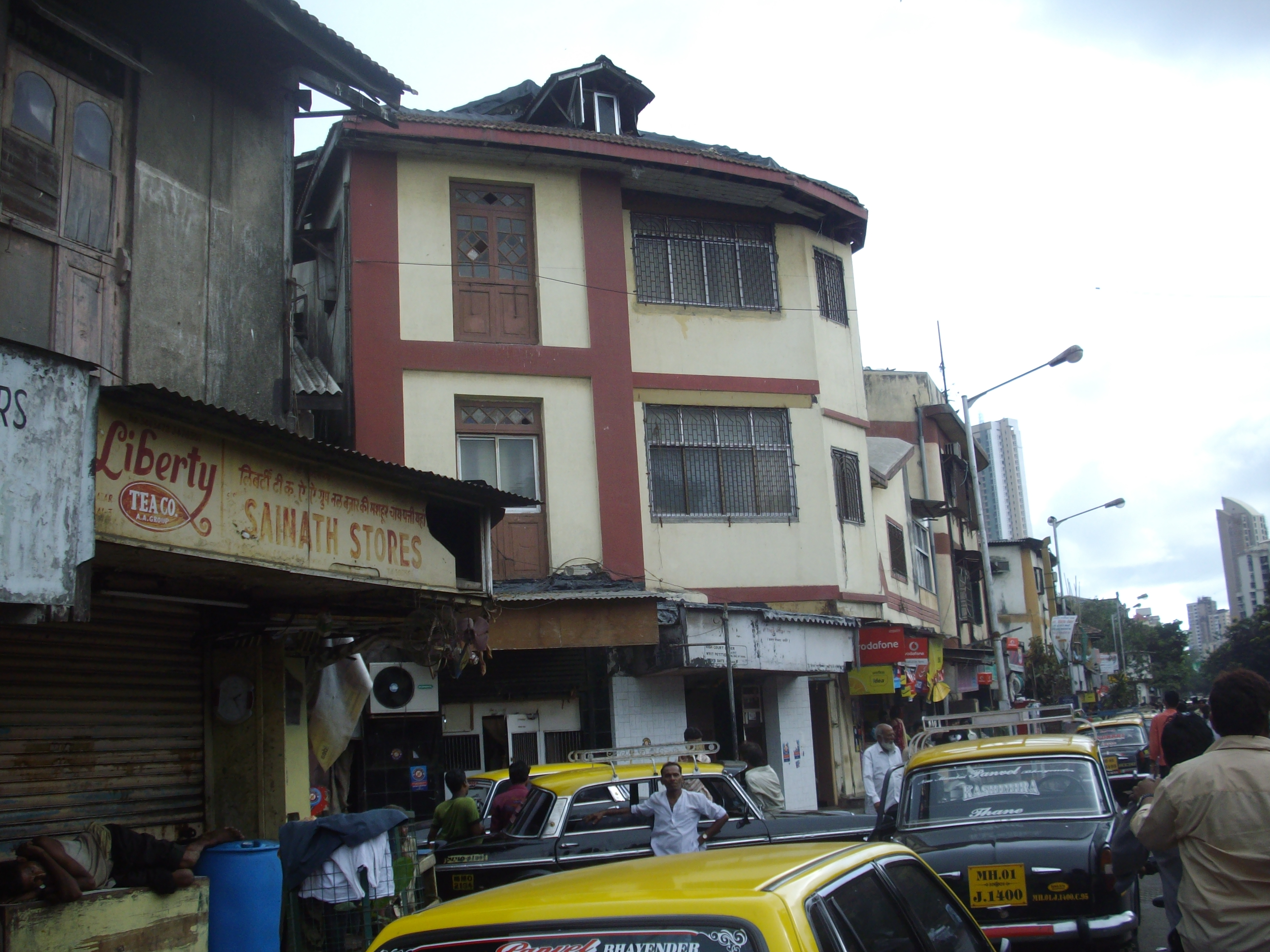

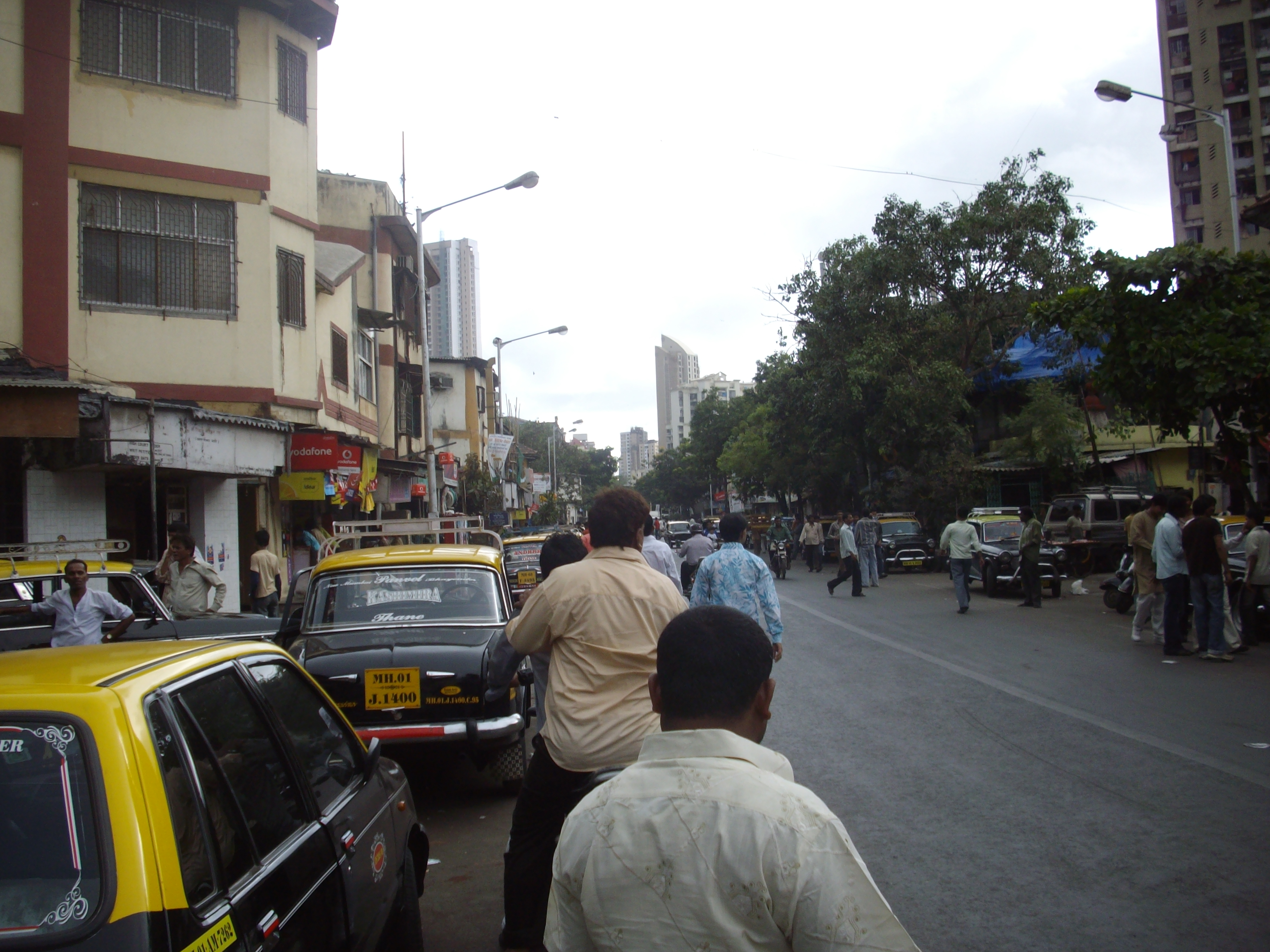

== See also ==
- Prostitution in India
- Prostitution in Asia
- Prostitution in Kolkata
- Prostitution in Mumbai
- Sonagachi
- All Bengal Women's Union
- Dedh galli, street market
- Durbar Mahila Samanwaya Committee
- Male prostitution
- Play House (Mumbai)
