= Durbar Mahila Samanwaya Committee =

Nonprofit organization in Calcutta, India

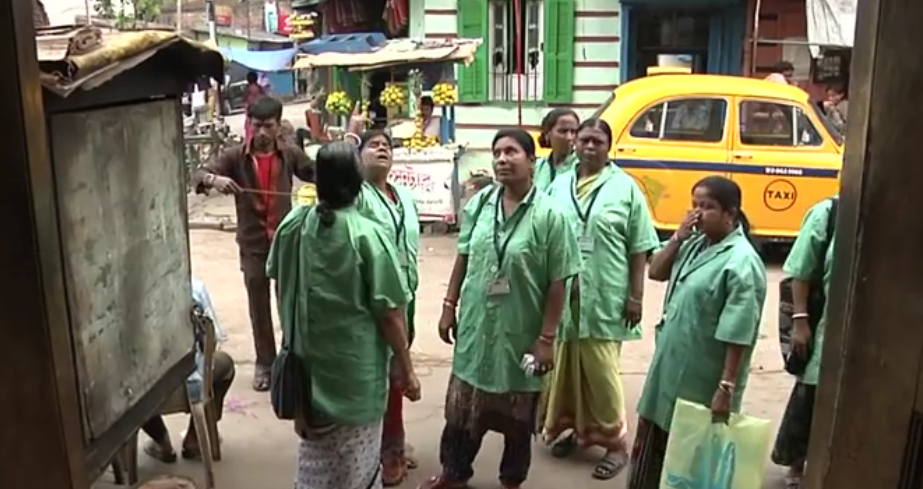
- Peer educators of the Durbar Mahila Samanwaya Committee in the streets of Kolkata
- Abbreviation: DMSC
- Formation: 1995; 31 years ago
- Type: CBO
- Location: Sonagachi, Kolkata
- Region served: West Bengal
- Members: sex workers
- President: Putul Halder
- Secretary: Kajol Bose
- Mentor: Bharati Dey
- Chief Advisor: Dr. Smarajit Jana
- Website: www.durbar.org

The Durbar Mahila Samanwaya Committee (Bengali: দুর্বার মহিলা সমন্বয় সমিতি Durbar Mohila Shômonbôe Shomiti "Unstoppable Women's Synthesis Committee"), or simply Durbar, is a collective of 60,000 sex workers in West Bengal. Established on 15 February 1992, in Sonagachi, the largest red-light district in Kolkata, West Bengal, India with estimated 11,000 sex workers, Durbar has been working on women's rights and sex workers' rights advocacy, anti-human trafficking and HIV/AIDS prevention. The Durbar states that its aims are the challenging and altering of the barriers that form the everyday reality of sex workers' lives as they relate to their poverty or their ostracism. Durbar runs 51 free clinics for sex workers across West Bengal, with support from organisations such as the Ford Foundation and the National AIDS Control Organisation (NACO), who also help Durbar in its initiatives like networking, rights protection and creating alternative livelihood for sex workers.

The group is overtly political in its aims of fighting for the recognition of prostitution as legal work and, of sex workers as workers and, for a secure social existence of sex workers and their children. They work for the legalisation of prostitution and seek to reform laws that restrict human rights of sex.

== History ==
On 15 February 1992, public health scientist Dr. Smarajit Jana of All India Institute of Hygiene and Public Health, Kolkata, visited the red-light area of Sonagachi for a HIV intervention research study. A peer education team was formed from amongst the sex workers and provided training. Shortly after, studies revealed larger issues amongst sex workers, such as sex workers rights, education of their children, access to financial services and handling of harassment by police and local thugs, along with promoting the use of condoms. Thus in 1995 he formed 'Durbar Mahila Samanwaya Committee' (DMSC) with 12 sex workers as stakeholders. By 2012 DMSC had a membership of 65,000 from 48 branches across the state of West Bengal, and continues to be managed by sex workers, their children and government officials as its board members, and has not just female sex workers as its members but also male and transgender sex workers.

Since its inception, it has been working as an advocacy group for sex workers and over the years, it has worked towards sensitizing general public about rights of sex workers, often initiating debate and discussion in public media and press, besides advocating abolition of 'The Immoral Traffic (Prevention) Act, 1956' (PITA), and legalisation of sex work. Many sex workers now have voters identity cards, health insurance and even bank accounts. In 1995, its consumer cooperative society and micro-credit programme, 'Usha' (literally meaning light), ensured that the Government of West Bengal altered the state's cooperative law to register it as a sex workers cooperative, instead of a 'housewives cooperative' under the prevalent state laws. By 2006–2007, small saving of its 5,000 members lead to an annual turnover to ₹9.75 crore (US$1.2 million), with loan of ₹2.12 crore (US$250,000) distributed amongst its members, which also helped break the monopoly of local moneylenders, who would charge interest rates of up to 300%. The DMSC hosted India's first national convention of sex workers on 14 November 1997 in Kolkata, titled 'Sex Work is Real Work: We Demand Workers Rights'.

DMSC runs 17 non-formal schools for children of sex workers, and two hostels, one at Ultadanga and the other at Baruipur. Its cultural wing, 'Komol Gandhar', teaches dance, drama, mime and music to children, who invited regularly for paid shows.

== HIV/AIDS project ==
The Durbar runs the STD/HIV Intervention Programme (commonly known as the Sonagachi Project) since 1999. The ownership and management of the Sonagachi Project was taken over by DMSC from the All India Institute of Hygiene and Public Health, a central government public health training and research institute based in Calcutta, which had initiated the programme in 1992. After gaining control of the STD/HIV Intervention Programme in 1999, DMSC began replicating the Sonagachi model in other red light areas in West Bengal. DMSC also implements STD/HIV intervention Programme among street-based sex workers and their clients, covering a population of over 20,000 sex workers and migrant labourers. DMSC currently implements and runs STD/HIV intervention programmes in 49 sex work sites in West Bengal.

The approach of Durbar's programme is based on the 3 Rs - Respect, Reliance and Recognition. Respect towards sex workers, Reliance on the knowledge and wisdom of the community of sex workers and, Recognition of sex work as an occupation, for protecting their occupational and human rights.

Durbar is active in building broader alliances to promote HIV prevention, care and support for HIV infected and affected individuals and families both at the national and regional levels.

== See also ==
- Prostitution in India
- Prostitution in Asia
- Prostitution in Kolkata
- Prostitution in Mumbai
- World Charter for Prostitutes' Rights
- All Bengal Women's Union
- Kamathipura
- Garstin Bastion Road, New Delhi
- Budhwar Peth, Pune
- Male prostitution
