= All Bengal Women's Union =

The All Bengal Women's Union was started in the 1932, when a group of women in West Bengal formed a cadre of like-minded women to help their helpless, exploited and victimized fellow women.

The All Bengal Women's Union is assisted in their work by several NGOs such as Save the Children Fund.

== History ==
The genesis of the group lay in the fact that trafficking in women and children had increased to an unprecedented extent in West Bengal and the Calcutta area and this NGO was an attempt to address the problem.

In between the two World Wars, the number of sailors and soldiers had considerably increased and the flesh trade found a ready and expanding market in Calcutta. The Calcutta Suppression of Immoral Traffic Act and the Children Act were passed in order to enable the police to rescue women and children from the brothels. A new bill entitled The Bengal Suppression of Immoral Traffic Bill was placed before the Bengal Legislative Assembly in 1932 by Mr. J. N. Basu, an eminent lawyer and social worker. The Bengal Presidency Council of Women and the All Bengal Women's Conference decided to form an independent organization for the Suppression of Immoral Traffic in Bengal. This society came into being with the name of All Bengal Women's Union and registered under Act XXI of 1860. The All Bengal Women's Union is affiliated to the International Abolitionist Federation, Geneva. On 1 April 1933, the bill was passed. Romola Sinha, the founder member was the first chairperson of Central Social Welfare Board in West Bengal.

Among the other notable ladies who had made significant contributions to the institution were Smt Maneck Modi, Smt Sheila Davar and Mrs Bela Sen. The visit of Princess Anne (in January 2007) was an important event in the history of the Institution. Mrs Davar became the president of the club on the death of Mrs Sinha. She also founded the Bustee Welfare Society located at Lovelock Place. Mrs Bela Sen was the chairman of the production department for a long time.

== Projects ==
The major projects of the organization have been:

- Creating homes for the housing of old aged women
- Creating children's welfare homes (Primary Schools)
- Providing vocational training
- Developing rehabilitation centers
- The Refill Project for those with learning disabilities
- The Bakery Project that provides employment to rehabilitated women
- Research and documentation into the sex trade of children and women
- Counselling services for mentally and psychologically traumatised women (sponsored by the Hope Kolkata Foundation)
- Sponsorship programs for health and education needs (in conjunction with ASHA and Save the Children)
- Free legal aid to women who are living below the poverty line to those who need it for any purpose
- The Sahayika Project, which trains girls who are victims of various atrocities and violence as ayahs and nursing assistants.
- The Shikshalaya Prakalpo Project, supported by UNICEF, aims to provide primary school education to the dropouts
- The Swadhar Project, intended to work with 25 girls from the red light district is in its genesis

== See also ==
- Prostitution in India
- Prostitution in Asia
- Prostitution in Kolkata
- Prostitution in Mumbai
- World Charter for Prostitutes' Rights
- Durbar Mahila Samanwaya Committee
- Kamathipura
- Garstin Bastion Road, New Delhi
- Budhwar Peth, Pune
- Male prostitution
