= Prostitution in Kolkata =

One of the largest sex industries in Asia

Prostitution in Kolkata (formerly Calcutta) is present in different forms and Kolkata's sex industry is one of the largest in Asia. Prostitution may be brothel-based or non-brothel based as in the case of call girls. India is regarded as having one of the largest commercial sex trades globally. Kolkata has many red-light districts, out of which Sonagachi is the largest red-light district in Asia with more than 50,000 commercial sex workers. According to a 2019 study by the Indian Journal of Public Health reported that West Bengal had the highest number of female sex workers (FSWs) in India, contributing nearly 25% of the country's total estimated 1.82 million FSWs. This suggests that around 455,000 FSWs were in West Bengal at that time.

== Prostitute population ==
The total number of prostitutes in Kolkata is unknown. Some estimates state that there are more than 60,000 brothel-based women and girls in prostitution in Kolkata.

The population of prostitutes in Sonagachi consists mainly of Nepalese, Bangladeshi and Indian women trafficked from north eastern and neighbouring states, many who are trafficked into the area by their boyfriends or family. Some sources estimate that are 30,000 Bangladeshi women in the brothels of Kolkata.

According to some sources the most common form of trafficking consists in offering false promises or some offer of help out of a dead-end or crisis situation, force is used later after the prostitutes have already been sold. "Mashis (brothel owners/older sex workers) use friendship, sympathy, also veiled threats to convince the women that it is now in their best interest to conform and begin working." The Crime Branch of Delhi Police has recovered one girl from Rabindra Sarani, Sonagachi who was missing along with eight other female inmates from Sanskar Ashram in Dilshad Garden since December 2, 2018. Eight out of these nine girls were originally from Nepal, while the ninth girl was from Bhagalpur, Bihar. These girls had been rescued from a brothel in G.B. Road," police said.

== History of prostitution ==
A farcical short-drama book named Beshyaleela ( বেশ্যালীলা ) was printed in the middle of the year 1880 written by an anonymous writer ( অজ্ঞাতনামা ). It is not very familiar or much discussed book till now. In this drama, a good description can be found about the negative attitudes shown by the then existing 19th century educated Bengali Babu class of people towards the prostitutes and the prostitution. From the first half of the 19th century, centering on Sonagachhi, a huge organised prostitution area surrounding Cornwallis Street (Now Bidhan Sarani) on the east, and Chitpur on the west were formed. Although many areas in Calcutta were inhabited by those prostitutes outside those areas also. On the south it was Kalighat to Khidirpur dock areas, in the middle-Calcutta it was Kalinga-Fenwick Bazar, on the far south in Kareya area many girls from different social-classes of Hindu-Muslim-Christian communities were engaged with this profession. More than that, there was no clear 'mark' or 'boundary-line' between the 'gentleman areas' and the 'prostitutes areas'. Many areas had scattered or mixed up population of those two kinds. Rather, many areas could be termed as 'half-gentleman' areas, where normal gentleman's families and various types of prostitutes co-existed side by side. From the middle of the 19th century, the British colonial administration, Christian Missionaries, and native English-knowing educated 'Victorian' Indian gentlemen started campaign against prostitutes. This was their part of the project of social 'sanitation' process for creating the so-called 'gentle-society'. Under the leadership of Mr. Kaliprasanna Singha, the 'Vidyotsahini Sabha' ( বিদ্যোৎসাহিনী সভা ) submitted one mass-petition in the Indian Legislative Council.

== Red-light districts ==
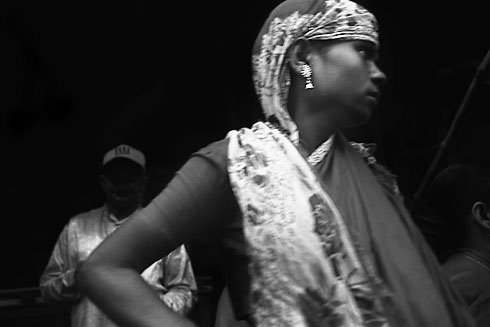
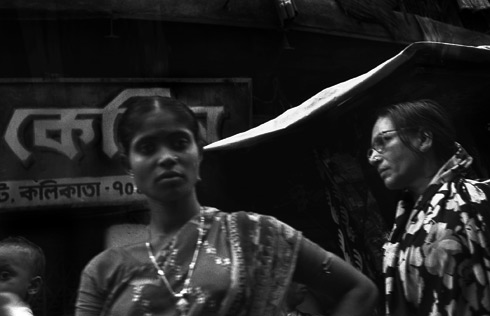
A scene in Sonagachi, Kolkata's red light district, 2005.

=== Bowbazar ===
Bowbazar has a red-light district where about 15,000 prostitutes work. The surrounding areas are inhabited by slum dwellers, truckers and migrant labourers. The adjacent Tiretta Bazar area is mainly a loading – unloading point with offices or godowns of a large number of transport companies. The area is very unsanitary.

=== Garia ===
There is a small red-light district in Garia. There were plans to build a home for retired sex workers in the area.

=== Kalighat ===
In south Kolkata, there is a red light district in the neighbourhood of Kalighat. Located around the banks of the Adi Ganga canal, an estimated 1,000 to 1,500 prostitutes live and work there. Kolkata has emerged as a hub for the trafficking of girls, who often arrive from Nepal, Bangladesh, Assam and Burma. From Kolkata they are often sold again to brothels in Mumbai (Bombay) or Chennai (Madras). Some will go on to the Middle East, Africa and Europe. Many of the women in Sonnagachi were forcedly taken away from their homes; some were tricked and others sold into prostitution by their friends and families; most of them are illiterate.

=== Kidderpore ===
The red-light district in Kidderpore is the third largest in Kolkata. NGO Apne Aap has a support centre in the area and has made two films about life in Kidderpore's red-light district: Kali and Shaadi Ka Shart Shauchalaya.

=== Lebu Bagan ===
There is a small, little known red-light district in north Kolkata called Lebu Bagan. About 100 prostitutes work there in four streets.

=== Sonagachi ===
The largest red-light district in Kolkata, is Sonagachi, it is also the largest red-light district in India. The area came to be known as Sona Gachi from a Sufi saint Sona Ghazi whose tomb (mazaar) is located in the locality. It is an area with several hundred multi-storey brothels, and around 10,000 sex workers. Sonagachi is located in North-Kolkata near the intersection of Chittaranjan Avenue Sova Bazar and Beadon Street, just north of the Marble Palace. The Prostitute Population mostly consists of woman's from poor regions of neighboring states and border regions. Previously there were many local prostitutes in Sonagachi. But now Rajasthani, Bihari, Odia and Khamia-Nepalese prostitutes have gained in number. According to class-division, the red-light areas of Kolkata are also divided into four different classes: poor-class, lower-class, middle-class, and rich-class. For example, The red-light area which once existed opposite to the diagonal angle of Khanna Cinema Hall was of 'poor-class'. When they contacted customers, they asked them "Khat-e na Chot-e" ? Which means, "Do you want to sleep in wooden cot or on jute-sheet spread over the floor?" As customers wished, the fee varied according to their choice. The lower-class and middle-class of prostitute areas were scattered around Haarkaata Gully and near Chetla/Kalighat bridge.

Several non-government organizations and government organizations operate here for the prevention of sexually transmitted diseases (STD) including AIDS. Sonagachi project is a prostitute's cooperative that operates in the area and empowers sex workers to insist on condom use; a relatively low percentage of prostitutes in this district (5.17% of the 13,000 prostitutes in Sonagachi) are estimated to be HIV positive. However, these efforts are hindered by human trafficking: refusal of clients to wear condom, and women controlled by third parties are forced to oblige.

According to some sources, prostitutes from Sonagachi who test HIV positive are not told about the results, and live with the disease without knowing about it "because the DMSC is worried that HIV positive women will be ostracized." Some prostitutes in Sonagachi have stated that "the clients, at least three quarters of them" refuse to use condoms and "If we force them to use the condom, they will just go next door. There are so many women working here, and in the end, everyone is prepared to work without protection for fear of losing trade."

=== Tollygunge ===
Tollygunge is a small red-light district located near Prince Anwar Shah Road.

== Street prostitution ==
Street prostitutes work in Esplanade Crossing, opposite of cinema 'Metro' and in the street between Elite Cinema Hall and Regal Cinema Hall, Jagat Cinema near Sealdah station and under Sealdah flyover, and another place is Ultadanga flyover and railway foot over bridge, Kalighat and Garia. Also a very small level high class escort service operates here, mostly college student or housewives or executives. Generally they use hotels booked by client or the flat of their pimp.

Male prostitutes often pick up clients in the Maidan, particularly in front of the Victoria Memorial.

== Call girls ==
Call girls operate independently and through pimps or escort agencies. Prostitution is operated from many beauty parlours and massage parlors in the city. Pimps (commonly called agents) in nightclubs, pubs, star hotels and floorboys acting as agents generally keep catalogues with pictures of the call girls. The girls operate in places like flats, hotels, etc. Generally the call girls go to the rooms in star hotels. However, when the client cannot provide a place of convenience, the agents provide one and the place is generally decided on before.

Call girls in Kolkata may come from middle class, upper middle class and upper-class families. They may be executives, housewives, college students or actresses.

The Kolkata Police have connections with many call girls working as their informers. Many criminals like to spend time with the girls. Hence some call girls are used by the police to get information about suspected criminals.

Durbar Mahila Samanwaya Committee (DMSC), which runs the Sonagachi project and several similar projects in West Bengal, lobbies for the recognition of sex workers' rights and full legalization. DMSC hosted India's first national convention of sex workers on 14 November 1997, in Kolkata, entitled 'Sex Work is Real Work: We Demand Workers Rights'.

== In popular culture ==
Born into Brothels, a 2004 American documentary film about the children of prostitutes in Sonagachi, won the Academy Award for Documentary Feature in 2004.

The documentary entitled Tales of The Night Fairies by Prof. Shohini Ghosh and Dr. Sabeena Ghadioke from Asia's leading Media institute AJK, Mass Communication Research Centre, is about the Sonagachi area. It has won the Jeevika Award for the best documentary feature on livelihood in India.

Popular actor Kamal Haasan's movie Mahanadhi has a storyline based on the Sonagachi. The film won three awards at the 41st National Film Awards. It received the National Film Award for Best Feature Film in Tamil and H. Sridhar and K. M. Surya Narayan received the National Film Award for Best Audiography. It also won Tamil Nadu State Film Award Special Prize for Best Film.

The Malayalam film Calcutta News depicts the story of women being trafficked and forced to become sex worker in Sonagachi.

== See also ==
- Prostitution in India
- Prostitution in Asia
- Prostitution in Mumbai
- All Bengal Women's Union

== Bibliography ==
- Anirban Pal (2008). "Political space for the civil society: The work of two community-based organizations in Kolkata". Habitat International. 32 (4): 424–436. doi:10.1016/j.habitatint.2007.11.008. ISSN 0197-3975.
- Mishra, Swasti Vardhan. "Reading Kolkata's Space of Prostitution as a Political Society." Environment and Urbanization ASIA 7, no. 2 (September 2016): 267–76. doi:10.1177/0975425316655653
- Banerjee, S. (1998). Dangerous Outcast: The Prostitute in Nineteenth Century Bengal. Seagull Books. ISBN 978-8-170-46119-7. LCCN lc98908088.
- Cornish, Flora, and Riddhi Banerjee. "How Do Relationships Between Peer Educators and Sex Workers Lead to Increased Condom Use?: A Social Capital Interpretation of the Sonagachi Project." Indian Anthropologist 43, no. 1 (2013): 51–64. JSTOR 41920141
- MacKinnon, Catharine A. "15. Trafficking, Prostitution, and Inequality". Butterfly Politics, Cambridge, MA and London, England: Harvard University Press, 2017, pp. 162–180. doi:10.4159/9780674977761-016
- Kotiswaran, P. (2011). Dangerous Sex, Invisible Labor: Sex Work and the Law in India. Princeton University Press. ISBN 978-0-691-14251-7. LCCN 2010052069.
- Ghosh, S. (2003). "Professional" Abortion Seekers: The Sex-workers of Kolkata. Abortion Assessment Project-India, Health watch Trust, Centre for Enquiry into Health and Allied Themes. ISBN 978-8-1-890-4224-0.
- Global Perspectives on Prostitution and Sex Trafficking: Africa, Asia, Middle East, and Oceania. Lexington Books. 2011. ISBN 978-0-739-13277-7. LCCN 2010043820.
- Nanda, B.; Ray, N. (2018). Discourse on Rights in India: Debates and Dilemmas. Taylor & Francis. ISBN 978-0-429-82714-3.
- Nair, P.M.; Sen, S. (2005). Trafficking in Women and Children in India. Orient Longman. ISBN 978-8-125-02845-1. LCCN 2006561197.
- Gangopadhyay, DN; Chanda, M; Sarkar, K; Niyogi, SK; Chakraborty, S; Saha, MK; Manna, B; Jana, S; Ray, P; Bhattacharya, SK; Detels, R (2005). "Evaluation of sexually transmitted diseases/human immunodeficiency virus intervention programs for sex workers in Calcutta, India". Sex Transm Dis. 32 (11): 680–4. doi:10.1097/01.olq.0000175399.43457.28. PMC 2903624. PMID 16254542.
- Tamang, Anand. A study of trafficked Nepalese girls and women in Mumbai and Kolkata, India / [principal investigator, Anand Tamang; research director, John Frederick]. Kathmandu : Terre des hommes Foundation, 2005 (2006 printing). viii, 50 p.; 30 cm. HQ240.B6 T35 2005 ISBN 9994656678 LCCN 2008-307461.
- Sinha, Indrani, 1950–2015. Mothers for sale : women in Kolkata's sex trade / Indrani Sinha and Shamita Das Dasgupta. Kolkata : Dasgupta Alliance, 2009. xix, 267 p.; 22 cm. HQ240.C3 S49 2009 ISBN 978-8-182-11051-9 LCCN 2009-341771.
- Bandyopadhyay, K; Banerjee, S; Goswami, DN; Dasgupta, A; Jana, S (2018). "Predictors of Inconsistent Condom Use among Female Sex Workers: A Community-Based Study in a Red-Light Area of Kolkata, India". Indian J Community Med. 43 (4): 274–278. doi:10.4103/ijcm.IJCM_84_18. PMC 6319282. PMID 30662179.
- Karan, A; Hansen, N (2018). "Does the Stockholm Syndrome affect female sex workers? The case for a "Sonagachi Syndrome"". BMC Int Health Hum Rights. 18 (1) 10. doi:10.1186/s12914-018-0148-4. PMC 5802051. PMID 29409491.
- Fehrenbacher, AE; Chowdhury, D; Ghose, T; Swendeman, D (2016). "Consistent Condom Use by Female Sex Workers in Kolkata, India: Testing Theories of Economic Insecurity, Behavior Change, Life Course Vulnerability and Empowerment". AIDS Behav. 20 (10): 2332–2345. doi:10.1007/s10461-016-1412-z. PMC 5016559. PMID 27170035.
- Swendeman, D; Fehrenbacher, AE; Roy, S; Das, R; Ray, P; Sumstine, S; Ghose, T; Jana, S (2018). "Gender disparities in depression severity and coping among people living with HIV/AIDS in Kolkata, India". PLOS ONE. 13 (11) e0207055. Bibcode:2018PLoSO..1307055S. doi:10.1371/journal.pone.0207055. PMC 6248946. PMID 30462688.
- Sinha, S; Prasad, I (2021). "Examining hopes, aspirations, and future plans of women in non-brothel-based sex work in Kolkata, India". Cult Health Sex. 23 (7): 913–926. doi:10.1080/13691058.2020.1740793. PMID 32452748.
- Swendeman, D; Fehrenbacher, AE; Ali, S; George, S; Mindry, D; Collins, M; Ghose, T; Dey, B (2015). ""Whatever I have, I have made by coming into this profession": the intersection of resources, agency, and achievements in pathways to sex work in Kolkata, India". Arch Sex Behav. 44 (4): 1011–23. doi:10.1007/s10508-014-0404-1. PMC 4382371. PMID 25583373.
- Sinha, S (2017). "Ethical and Safety Issues in Doing Sex Work Research: Reflections From a Field-Based Ethnographic Study in Kolkata, India". Qual Health Res. 27 (6): 893–908. doi:10.1177/1049732316669338. PMC 5865471. PMID 27651071.
- Jana, S; Ray, P; Roy, S; Kadam, A; Gangakhedkar, RR; Rewari, BB; Moses, S; Becker, ML (2021). "Successful integration of HIV pre-exposure prophylaxis into a community-based HIV prevention program for female sex workers in Kolkata, India". Int J STD AIDS. 32 (7): 638–647. doi:10.1177/0956462420983992. PMC 8091404. PMID 33596735.
- Jana, S; Basu, I; Rotheram-Borus, MJ; Newman, PA (2004). "The Sonagachi Project: a sustainable community intervention program". AIDS Educ Prev. 16 (5): 405–14. doi:10.1521/aeap.16.5.405.48734. PMID 15491952.
- Ganguly, S; Chakraborty, D; Goswami, DN (2018). "HIV/AIDS epidemic in West Bengal: An overview". J Family Med Prim Care. 7 (5): 898–902. doi:10.4103/jfmpc.jfmpc_192_17. PMC 6259504. PMID 30598930.
- Sarkar, K; Bal, B; Mukherjee, R; Chakraborty, S; Saha, S; Ghosh, A; Parsons, S (2008). "Sex-trafficking, violence, negotiating skill, and HIV infection in brothel-based sex workers of eastern India, adjoining Nepal, Bhutan, and Bangladesh". J Health Popul Nutr. 26 (2): 223–31. PMC 2740670. PMID 18686555.
- Kumar, S (1998). "Model for sexual health found in India's West Bengal". Lancet. 351 (9095): 46. doi:10.1016/S0140-6736(05)78070-3. PMID 9454057.
- Evans, C; Lambert, H (January 2008). "The limits of behaviour change theory: condom use and contexts of HIV risk in the Kolkata sex industry". Cult Health Sex. 10 (1): 27–42. doi:10.1080/13691050701561393. PMID 18038279.
- Sinha, A; Goswami, DN; Haldar, D; Choudhury, KB; Saha, MK; Dutta, S (2020). "Sociobehavioural matrix and knowledge, attitude and practises regarding HIV/AIDS among female sex workers in an international border area of West Bengal, India". J Family Med Prim Care. 9 (3): 1728–1732. doi:10.4103/jfmpc.jfmpc_1196_19. PMC 7266195. PMID 32509679.
- Ghosh, Swati. "Empowerment of Sex Workers: The Kolkata Experience." Economic and Political Weekly, vol. 41, no. 13, Economic and Political Weekly, 2006, pp. 1289–91, JSTOR 4418032.
- Sarkar, K., B. Bal, R. Mukherjee, S.K. Niyogi, M.K. Saha, and S.K. Bhattacharya. "Epidemiology of HIV Infection among Brothel-Based Sex Workers in Kolkata, India." Journal of Health, Population and Nutrition 23, no. 3 (2005): 231–35. JSTOR 23499323.
- Bandyopadhyay, Aparna. "CHRONICLES OF LOVE, BETRAYAL AND PROSTITUTION IN LATE COLONIAL BENGAL." Proceedings of the Indian History Congress, vol. 75, Indian History Congress, 2014, pp. 723–28, JSTOR 44158453.
- Nag, Moni. "Sex Workers in Sonagachi: Pioneers of a Revolution." Economic and Political Weekly, vol. 40, no. 49, Economic and Political Weekly, 2005, pp. 5151–56, JSTOR 4417483.
- Evans, Catrin, and Helen Lambert. "The Limits of Behaviour Change Theory: Condom Use and Contexts of HIV Risk in the Kolkata Sex Industry." Culture, Health & Sexuality, vol. 10, no. 1, Taylor & Francis, Ltd., 2008, pp. 27–42, JSTOR 20460978.
- Kotiswaran, Prabha. "Born Unto Brothels: Toward a Legal Ethnography of Sex Work in an Indian Red-Light Area." Law & Social Inquiry, vol. 33, no. 3, [ American Bar Foundation, Wiley], 2008, pp. 579–629, JSTOR 20108776.
