= Prostitution in Mumbai =

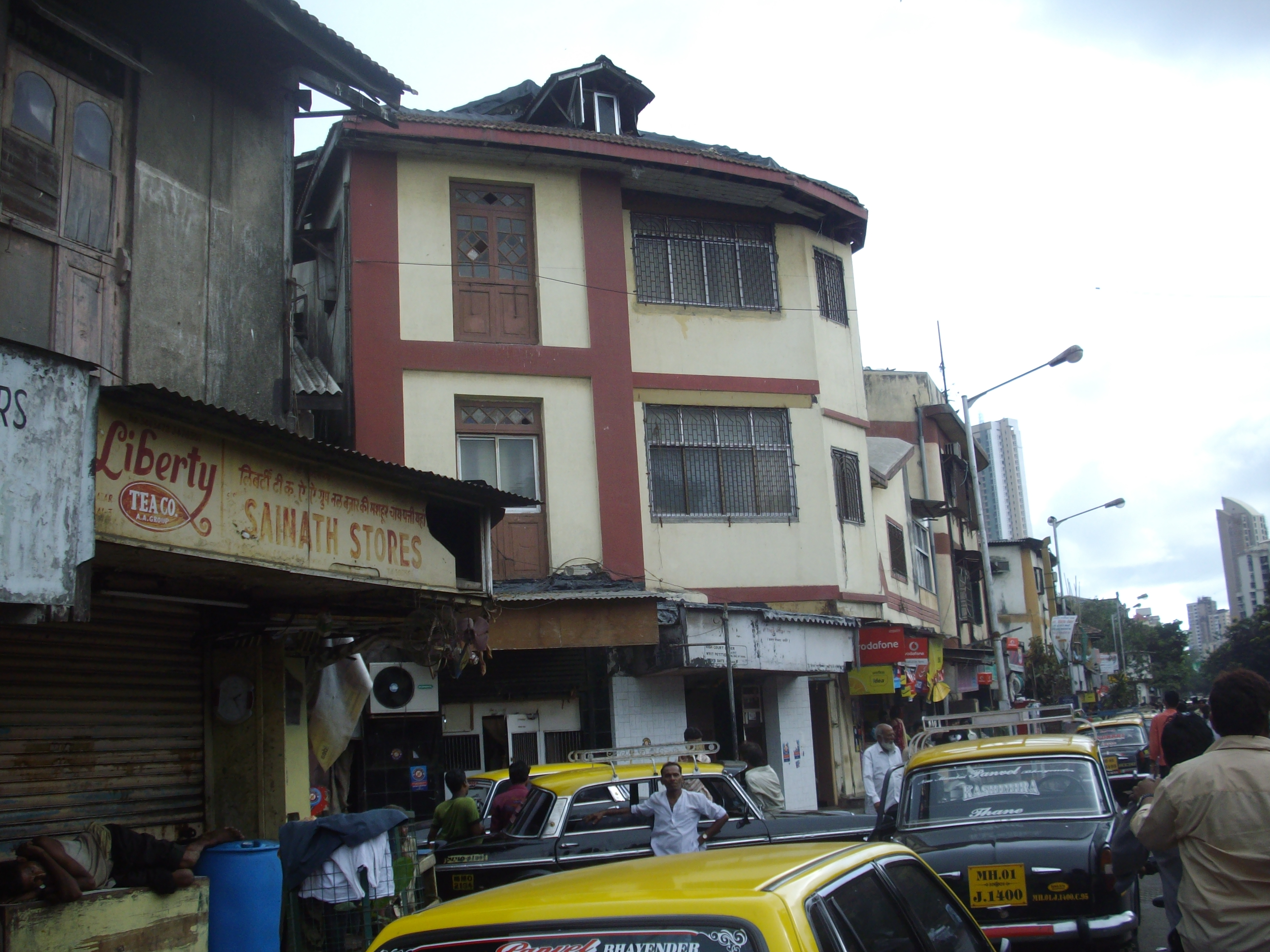
A brothel in Kamathipura

Mumbai (formerly known as Bombay), is a city in India which contains the neighborhood of Kamathipura, one of the largest red-light districts in Asia. India is regarded as having one of the largest commercial sex trades globally. These neighborhoods are so large and popular that Mumbai has been called the "ultimate destination" for sex tourism. The red-light districts or lal bazaars in Mumbai are inhabited by thousands of sex workers including women, men, children, and transgender people.

== History of Mumbai ==
Mumbai is the capital city of the state of Maharashtra and is one of the largest cities in India with an estimated population of over 18 million people. India is considered to be the global epicenter of sex work and has the largest commercial sex trade in the world. Mumbai is the largest city in the state of Maharashtra and is often referred to as the ultimate sex tourist destination. India is a country made up of people that celebrate and practice a variety of cultural and religious traditions, and the people that make up India come from different racial and ethnic backgrounds. Although India is not unique in gender-discrimination based violence, it is a country that on one hand controls the sexuality of women yet is also home to one of the largest flourishing commercial sex trades.

One of the red light districts in Mumbai emerged from British colonial rule in the middle of the nineteenth century. It was created out of a fear of British soldiers engaging in homosexual relations with other soldiers. The British also saw an additional reason for needing prostitution, especially amongst the military. It was seen as necessary to stave off boredom among soldiers and to reinforce imperial dominance through sexual control of Indian women. In creating a zone for British soldiers to engage in "safe heterosexual relations" British colonial administration held the power to separate the brothel area from the "respectable" residential areas which granted them power and control over the lives of the sex workers.

Research into sex work in Mumbai originally drew attention to the HIV/AIDS patterns discovered there. Researchers have subsequently studied the state of sex work in Mumbai by interviewing and collecting the narratives of those involved in and affected by sex work.

== Terminology ==
Svati P. Shah, an anthropologist who studies gender and women in South Asia, says that the use of the term prostitution is a matter of context and argues against its use as a universal term that combines all forms of transactional sex into a singular conceptual framework. While those involved in current and past research concerning this issue typically employ the term sex work, others argue that prostitution refers more to human trafficking. Some supporters of the abolition of prostitution reject the use of the term sex worker as they argue that it legitimises prostitution. According to the anthropologist Susanne Asman there were vague terms used in Ichigyang to refer to women engaging in sex work; they were often described as "Bombay going" or "women doing that work".

The terminology used to describe sex work in Mumbai depends on context.

== State of sex work in Mumbai ==
Mumbai contains the largest red light district in Asia, in the neighborhood of Kamathipura. Kamathipura is estimated to have over five thousand sex workers, who are identified as male, female, and transgender. Of the estimated five thousand sex workers located in Kamathipura the majority are assumed to be victims of sex trafficking. However it is difficult to determine the exact number of those involved in trafficking in the red light districts of Mumbai due to the criminal nature of the issue and the scale of it. The victims are typically young girls, and are usually trafficked from the surrounding areas, but they are sometimes trafficked from neighboring countries such as Nepal and Bangladesh. Hijaras can also be found working in the red light districts of Mumbai. It has been argued that hijaras are more likely to participate in high risk sex acts with clients because it is believed they cannot contract or spread disease or illness. Sex workers in Mumbai at brothels and other commercial sex sites are visited by both men from the local area and those traveling to the area in search of employment.

Currently there are a large number of vague restrictions regarding the act of participating in sex work.

== Sex workers in Mumbai ==
Many studies have indicated that sex workers in Mumbai enter into the sex industry for a range of reasons. Many of the interviews and studies that have been conducted demonstrate that when people enter or are forced into the industry it is usually as a result of some kind of crisis. Researchers have used interviews to study how and why women participate in sex work. Through these interviews it has been concluded that female sex workers typically end up in sex work for a variety of reasons ranging from but not limited to marital abuse, death of their husband, poverty, or death of a parent. Researchers have identified these scenarios as some of the most common. Ashwini Tambe, professor and scholar in gender and women studies, argues that in Mumbai the realm of sex work and the role of family are not separate. In studying the role of sex workers in Mumbai, it was also found that many women are sold into sex work by friends, acquaintances, or family members. Increased economic hardship can result in women such as housewives and daily laborers using sex work as a method of securing additional income to support themselves and/or their families.

According to Robert Friedman, an American investigative journalist, human rights organizations say that over 90% of female sex workers in Mumbai are considered indentured servants.

Traditionally research has usually concerned itself with the situation of female and child sex workers in Mumbai, ignoring the increasing proportion of male and transgender sex workers. Including male sex workers in discussions about the state of sex work in Mumbai is necessary, as male sex workers are considered a high-risk group for HIV infection. As research has developed concerning the role of male sex workers in Mumbai it has been demonstrated through interviews that although these men's responses vary with their sexual identities, their soliciting practices, sex roles and clientele, they nevertheless indicate that they entered into sex work as a result of their poor economic status.

As efforts have increased to enforce anti-human trafficking and HIV/AIDS prevention, brothels have become the main target of these preventive measures. This has increased the diversification of sex work occurring in Mumbai as clients have become more likely to seek services outside of brothels because they believe they are less likely to contract HIV/AIDS.

=== Conditions of sex workers in Mumbai ===
Social workers have been given the responsibility of addressing the issues associated with sex trafficking in Mumbai, and the large number of young girls trafficked. As the industry continues to expand the demand for young girls has begun to rise. The brothels in the red light districts of Mumbai are patrolled by goondas, thugs who work for or are part of the mafia, to ensure that enslaved sex workers do not escape or run away. Police raids are said to target mostly girls from outside India and also underage girls, who are often kept out of view by brothel owners.

Many of the young women who are sex workers in Mumbai work under madams or have pimps

The madams of female sex workers usually receive payment upfront for the female sex worker performing the sex act. From their wages the female sex workers typically have to pay for electricity, food, rent, interest, and bribes paid to local police.

In recent years Mumbai has reported a dwindling number of brothels as a result of gentrification, heightened anti-trafficking efforts and police enforcement raids. This has resulted in the dispersal of sex workers, increasing their vulnerability. While efforts to encourage women sex workers to use condoms have been emphasized, their users often face stigmatization. Young girls who have been trafficked into sex work often have no autonomy and no choice as to whether or not they use condoms when engaging in sex work. Condoms are also not used when a girl is presented and sold to a client as a virgin – a practice known as sar dhaki – demonstrating that despite targeted efforts to ensure safer working conditions this remain an issue.

=== HIV and AIDS patterns in Mumbai ===
Following the first case of HIV/AIDS identified in Mumbai, efforts to prevent the disease were undertaken. With the implementation of these efforts advocates recognized they had to understand the functioning of the sex industry. As efforts to engage with sex workers for HIV/AIDS prevention increased, many of these concentrated solely on female sex workers, neglecting male and transgender sex workers. From 2006 to 2009, Mumbai experienced an intensive HIV prevention campaign and there was increased use of safer sex in brothels and among street-based sex workers. Programs intended to reduce the spread of HIV/AIDS range from but are not limited to efforts that include peer based education, condom distribution, increased screening and treatment of sexually transmitted infections and diseases. Between the years 2006 and 2009 the rates of women with HIV in Maharashtra went from 26% to 27.5%, with a large proportion of these infection rates coming from Mumbai. According to Human Rights Watch more than half of the population of sex workers in Mumbai have contracted HIV. It is a characteristic of some Arab and Indian men to bid for and purchase virgin sex workers from Mumbai as it is believed that sex with a virgin can cure gonorrhea and syphilis. Some female sex workers develop a relationship with their clients, considering them a lover or a partner. In this case they often will not use a condom with the partner, even if they are HIV positive.

== Research ==
Svati P. Shah, the author of Street Corner Secrets and other works about research into the conditions of red light districts in Mumbai, has been working to broaden the discussion about the conditions there. Shah warns those interested in doing research work in Mumbai against sensationalizing the conditions of sex work and the patterns of HIV and AIDS. The anthropologist Susanne Asman has studied the lives of women sex workers who have returned to Nepal after working and living in Mumbai for some years. Over the course of ten years Susanne Asman collected information and conducted fieldwork concerning stories, lives and behaviour patterns of women sex workers returning to their home villages from Mumbai. As research has developed and more nuanced studies have been released many researchers still place much emphasis on the practices and politics of sex work.

== See also ==
- Prostitution in India
- Prostitution in Asia
- Prostitution in Kolkata
- All Bengal Women's Union
- Durbar Mahila Samanwaya Committee
- Sonagachi
- Male prostitution
