= Prostitution in Asia =

Legal status of prostitution across Asia. Legalization – prostitution legal and regulated Abolitionism – prostitution is legal, but organized activities such as brothels and pimping are illegal; prostitution is not regulated Prohibitionism – prostitution illegal Legality varies with local laws

The legality of prostitution in Asia varies by country. There is often a significant difference in Asia between prostitution laws and the practice of prostitution. In 2011, the Asian Commission on AIDS estimated there were 10 million sex workers in Asia and 75 million male customers.

Child prostitution is a serious problem in this region. Past surveys indicate that 30 to 35 percent of all prostitutes in the Mekong sub-region of Southeast Asia are between 12 and 17 years of age.

The World Health Organization has called for the decriminalisation of sex work as a means of combating HIV/AIDS. The Asian region has the lowest incidence (5.2%).

This page uses the UN system of subregions.

== Central Asia ==
=== Kazakhstan ===
Kazakhstan
- Prostitution legal Buying sex legal Brothels illegal Procuring illegal Solicitation illegal

In Kazakhstan prostitution itself is legal, but acts facilitating prostitution, such as operating a brothel or prostitution ring, are illegal. Forced prostitution and prostitution connected to organized crime are prohibited. Non-governmental organizations (NGOs) reported that criminal prostitution rings often included local law enforcement officials.

Estimates of the number of prostitutes in Kazakhstan vary from 4,000 and 25,000, including a number from Kyrgyzstan, Uzbekistan and Ukraine.

Sex workers often face harassment, extortion, arbitrary arrest, rape, and violence from the police.

=== Kyrgyzstan ===
Kyrgyzstan
- Prostitution legal Buying sex legal Brothels illegal Procuring illegal Solicitation illegal

Prostitution in Kyrgyzstan has been legal since 1998, but the operation of brothels, pimping, and recruiting persons into prostitution are illegal, with penalties of up to five years There are estimated to be 7,100 sex workers in the country. Prostitution occurs on the streets, in bars, hotels and brothels.

Prostitution has been blamed for a rise in HIV/AIDS. The HIV prevalence amongst sex workers is 2%.

Sex trafficking is a problem in the country.

=== Tajikistan ===
Tajikistan
- Prostitution legal Buying sex legal Brothels illegal Procuring illegal Solicitation illegal

Prostitution in Tajikistan is legal, but related activities such as soliciting, procuring and brothel keeping are prohibited. Prostitution has increased within the country since the collapse of the Soviet Union. UNAIDS estimate there are 14,100 female sex workers in Tajikistan. Government official figures for 2015 were 1,777 prostitutes and 194 brothels. Prostitution occurs on the streets and in bars, restaurants, nightclubs and saunas, and HIV prevalence is 3.5% amongst sex workers.

Previously, as soliciting is an administrative offence, arrested prostitutes are given a nominal fine and released, while those procuring are prosecuted, potentially being punished by up to eight years in jail. In 2015 a new law was passed that doubled the fine for solicitation and added 15 days of home arrest to the punishment.

=== Turkmenistan ===
Turkmenistan
- Prostitution illegal Buying sex legal

Prostitution in Turkmenistan is illegal but common. Prostitution has increased within the country since the collapse of the Soviet Union. Poverty is one of the reasons women have turned to prostitution, sometimes under pressure from family members.

Prostitutes frequent bars, casinos and nightclubs; some are addicted to heroin. In Daşoguz, a major truck stop, many 'night butterflies' service the truck drivers in the overnight truck parks.

=== Uzbekistan ===
Uzbekistan
- Prostitution illegal Buying sex legal

Prostitution in Uzbekistan is illegal but common, especially in Samarkand, Fergana, and the capital, Tashkent. Prostitution has increased within the country since the collapse of the Soviet Union. UNAIDS estimate there are 22,000 sex workers in the country. Many of the women have turned to prostitution in Uzbekistan because of poverty.

Law enforcement is inconsistent. Some police officers will harass prostitutes and extort "protection money" from them. Sometimes prostitutes work with police as informants to avoid being arrested.

== East Asia ==
=== China ===
China
- Prostitution illegal Buying sex illegal

Officially, prostitution is illegal in mainland China, but in practice is widespread.

Shortly after taking power in 1949, the Chinese Communist Party embarked upon a series of campaigns that purportedly eradicated prostitution from mainland China by the early 1960s. Since the loosening of government controls over society in the early 1980s, prostitution in mainland China not only has become more visible, but can now be found throughout both urban and rural areas. In spite of government efforts, prostitution has now developed to the extent that it comprises an industry, one that involves a great number of people and produces a considerable economic output. Prostitution has also become associated with a number of problems, including organized crime, government corruption and sexually transmitted diseases. For example, a Communist Party official who was a top provincial campaigner against corruption was removed from his post after he was caught in a hotel room with a prostitute.

==== Hong Kong ====
Hong Kong
- Prostitution legal Buying sex legal Brothels illegal Procuring illegal Solicitation illegal

Prostitution in Hong Kong is itself legal, but organised prostitution is illegal, as there are laws against keeping a vice establishment, causing or procuring another to be a prostitute, living on the prostitution of others, or public solicitation.

The most visible public venues for sex workers in Hong Kong, especially for tourists, are massage parlours and the so-called "Japanese style night clubs". However, most of the commercial sex worker industry consists of women working in small, usually one-room apartments, usually referred to as "one-woman brothels", the equivalent of the "walk-up brothel" in the United Kingdom. They advertise for clients through the Internet and local classifieds. Most popular mainstream newspapers will carry such classifieds with brothel guides as an insert within racing form guides. Yellow neon advertising boxes were used to advertise sexual services to such an extent that "yellow" (黃) became synonymous with prostitution.

==== Macau ====
Macau
- Prostitution legal Buying sex legal Brothels illegal Procuring illegal

Prostitution is legal in Macau unlike in mainland China, because the city is a special administrative region of the country. However, operating a brothel and procuring are both illegal in Macau, with the latter punishable by a maximum jail sentence of 8 years. The city has a large sex trade despite there being no official red-light district. The trade is said to be controlled by Chinese organized crime groups, which has occasionally led to violent clashes. Street prostitution takes place in Macau and prostitutes also work in low-rent buildings, massage parlours and illegal brothels, and the casinos, nightclubs, saunas and some of the larger hotels. Most hotels, however, have suspected prostitutes removed from the premises. Many of the city's sidewalks and underpasses are littered with prostitutes' calling cards.

=== Japan ===
Japan
- Prostitution illegal Buying sex legal

Prostitution is illegal in Japan; however, as the definition of prostitution is "intercourse with an unspecified person in exchange for payment", the sale of other sexual services is legal and widespread.

Prostitution has existed throughout the country's history. While the Anti-Prostitution Law of 1956 states that "No person may either do prostitution or become the customer of it," loopholes, liberal interpretations and loose enforcement of the law have allowed the sex industry to prosper and earn an estimated 2.3 trillion yen ($24 billion) a year.

In Japan, the "sex industry" (風俗, fūzoku; literally "public morals") is not synonymous with prostitution. Since Japanese law defines prostitution as "intercourse with an unspecified person in exchange for payment," most fūzoku offer only non-coital services, such as conversation, dancing, or bathing, to remain legal. Nevertheless, polls by MiW and the National Women's Education Center of Japan have found that between 20% and 40% of Japanese men have paid for sex.

=== Mongolia ===
Mongolia
- Prostitution illegal

Prostitution is illegal in Mongolia but widespread in some areas. The Global Fund for Tuberculosis, HIV/AIDS and Malaria estimated there were about 19,000 sex workers in the country in 2006. Many women in Mongolia turn to prostitution through poverty.

Sex trafficking and child prostitution, including child sex tourism, are problems in the country.

=== North Korea ===
North Korea
- Prostitution illegal Buying sex illegal

Prostitution is illegal in North Korea and, according to the North Korean government, does not exist. Under Article 261 of the Criminal law, prostitution is punishable by up to two years labour if engaged in "multiple times". According to CIA analyst Helen-Louise Hunter, during the rule of Kim Il-sung, there was no organized prostitution, but some prostitution was still practiced discreetly near railroad stations and restaurants. While defectors currently report widespread prostitution, this is not experienced by visitors to the country. Allegedly, kippumjo provides sexual entertainment to high-ranking officials.

=== South Korea ===
South Korea
- Prostitution illegal Buying sex illegal

Prostitution is illegal in South Korea, but according to the Korea Women's Development Institute, the sex trade in Korea was estimated to amount to 14 trillion South Korean won ($13 billion) in 2007, roughly 1.6% of the nation's gross domestic product.

According to a survey conducted by the Department of Urology at the Korea University College of Medicine in 2015, 23.1% of males and 2.6% of females, aged 18–69, had sexual experience with a prostitute. Despite legal sanctions and police crackdowns, prostitution continues to flourish in South Korea, while sex workers continue to actively resist the state's activities.

=== Taiwan ===
Taiwan
- Prostitution illegal except in designated zones

Legislation was introduced in 2011 to allow local governments in Taiwan to set up "special zones" where prostitution is permitted. Outside these zones prostitution is illegal. As of 2017 no "special zones" had been opened.

== North Asia ==
=== Russia ===
Russia
- Prostitution illegal Buying sex legal

Prostitution is an administrative, but not criminal, offence in Russia (such as, for example, drinking beer in a public place or walking nude on the street). The maximum punishment is a fine up to 2000 rubles (~$30); however, organising prostitution or engaging somebody into prostitution is punishable by a prison term.

== South Asia ==
=== Afghanistan ===
Afghanistan
- Prostitution illegal Buying sex legal

Prostitution is illegal in Afghanistan, with punishments ranging from 5 to 15 years imprisonment. Despite Afghanistan being deeply religious and one of the most conservative countries in the world, where sex outside marriage is against the law, some prostitution activities are reported in the capital Kabul as well as in the Mazar-e-Sharif area in the north of the country.

Small number of women from Iran, Tajikistan, China, and possibly Uganda and other countries are imported for prostitution into Afghanistan. According to the Afghan Interior Ministry's department of sexual crimes, about 2 to 3 prostitution arrests were made each week in Afghanistan between 2007 and 2008.

=== Bangladesh ===
Bangladesh
- Prostitution legal and regulated Buying sex legal Brothels licensed Solicitation illegal

Prostitution is legal and regulated in Bangladesh, but it is not considered a respectable profession by Bangladeshi society. Prostitutes must register and swear an affidavit stating she is unable to find any other work. Local NGOs estimate the total number of female prostitutes to be as many as 100,000.

There are 20 brothel-villages in the country. The largest is Daulatdia which has about 1,300 sex workers, it is one of the largest brothels in the world.

Unwed mothers, orphans, and others outside the normal family support system are the most vulnerable to human trafficking. Government corruption greatly facilitates the process of trafficking. Police and local government officials often ignore trafficking in women and children for commercial sexual exploitation and are easily bribed by brothel owners and pimps.

=== Bhutan ===
Bhutan
- Prostitution illegal Buying sex illegal

Prostitution is illegal in Bhutan but in many of Bhutan's border towns there are people openly practicing in the sex trade. Prostitution mainly occurs in bars, clubs & hotels. Some of the sex workers are employed by bar and hotel owners to attract customers. Prostitution also occurs in the capital, Thimphu. There are thought to be 400 - 500 sex workers in the country, many from poor backgrounds who enter prostitution for financial reasons.

In 2017, the NGO Lhak-Sam proposed that sex work be legalised by the government, but the proposal was turned down.

=== India ===
India
- Prostitution legal Buying sex legal Brothels illegal Procuring illegal Solicitation illegal

In India, prostitution is legal only if carried out in the private residence of a prostitute or others. A number of related activities are crimes, including soliciting in a public place, kerb crawling, owning or managing a brothel, prostitution in a hotel, child prostitution, pimping and pandering. But many brothels illegally operate in many Indian cities including Mumbai, Delhi and Kolkata.

There were an estimated two million female sex workers in the country in 1997. In 2007, the Ministry of Women and Child Development reported the presence of over 3 million female sex workers in India, with 35.47 percent of them entering the trade before the age of 18 years.Transgender people also make up a significant share of sex workers, around 15% of the sex worker population, yet they remain an understudied and undeserved group in the commercial sex sector. They are among the most exploited and harassed groups in the sex trade.

=== Maldives ===
Maldives
- Prostitution illegal Buying sex illegal

Prostitution in the Maldives is illegal under Islamic sharia law, but occurs on a small scale. A 2014 survey by the Human Rights Commission of the Maldives (HRCM) estimated there were 1,139 female prostitutes on the islands. Some women enter the country posing as tourists but then engage in sex work.

Following complaints that sexual services were being offered in spas in hotels, and a protest in the capital, Malé, by the opposition Adhaalath Party, the government ordered the closure of the spas in 1,000 hotels in late December 2011. Following pressure from the country's tourism industry, president Mohamed Nasheed lifted the ban a few days later.

=== Nepal ===
Nepal
- Prostitution illegal Buying sex legal

Prostitution is illegal in Nepal. The Human Trafficking and Transportation (Control) Act, 2064, Act Number 5 of the Year 2064 (2008), criminalises prostitution and living of the earnings of prostitution by including it in the definition of human trafficking.

For many, entering into the sex industry is the only way in which they could survive economically in Nepal. However, sex work is not officially recognized among the industrial or service sectors of labour. Sex trafficking happens on a large scale in Nepal, but voluntary sex work is common.

=== Pakistan ===
Pakistan
- Prostitution illegal Buying sex illegal

Prostitution is illegal in Pakistan but a taboo culture of sex-trade exists as an open secret. Prostitution is largely based in organisational setups like brothels or furthered by individual call girls in the Punjab province of Pakistan. The sex trade is deemed illegal in the country due to the declaration of extramarital sex as an immoral activity. Pakistani prostitutes, thus, operate underground and in spite of the legal difficulties, prostitution in Pakistan is prevalent. In some areas of the country prostitution is strictly illegal and traditionally punishable by death, especially in the Federally Administered Tribal Areas (FATA), Khyber-Pakhtunkhwa and Balochistan regions.

=== Sri Lanka ===
Sri Lanka
- Prostitution illegal Buying sex illegal

Prostitution is illegal in Sri Lanka, and related activities such as soliciting, procuring, and brothels are outlawed. It is also illegal to traffic persons for prostitution, especially minors. Prostitution is not as widespread in Sri Lanka as in some neighbouring countries. It is estimated that there are 40,000 prostitutes (known as "Ganikawa") in the country, and nearly half of them operate in Colombo.

== Southeast Asia ==
=== Brunei ===
Brunei
- Prostitution illegal Buying sex illegal

Prostitution in Brunei is illegal and can incur a punishment of imprisonment for 1 year and a fine of BN$5,000 for a first offence, or 3 years and BN$10,000 on a second or subsequent conviction.

In 1993, in a diplomatic affair dubbed as the Brunei beauties, Senator Ernesto Maceda, with testimony from Rosanna Roces, claimed that there were illegal recruitment of Filipinas in Brunei as prostitutes and entertainers. Prince Jefri, the brother of Sultan Hassanal Bolkiah were among those linked to the scandal, in which Ruffa Gutierrez, Vivian Velez, Lea Orosa, Aurora Sevilla, Sheila Israel, Rachel Lobangco, Tetchie Agbayani, Maritoni Fernandez, Gretchen Barretto, and Cristina Gonzales were alleged to be amongst the victims.

=== Cambodia ===
Cambodia
- Prostitution illegal Buying sex legal

Prostitution in Cambodia is illegal, but prevalent. The 2008 Cambodian Law on Suppression of Human Trafficking and Sexual Exploitation has proven controversial, with international concerns regarding human rights abuses resulting from it, such as outlined in the 2010 Human Rights Watch report.

Violence against prostitutes, especially gang rape, called bauk in Cambodian, is very common. Perpetrators include customers and police officers. According to some sources, such assaults are not condemned by society, due to the extreme stigmatization of prostitutes.

=== Indonesia ===
Indonesia
- No prostitution laws

Prostitution in Indonesia is legally considered a "crime against decency/morality", although it is widely practised, tolerated and even regulated in some areas. Some women are financially motivated to become prostitutes, while others may be forced by friends, relatives or strangers. Traditionally, they have met with customers in entertainment venues or special prostitution complexes, or lokalisasi. However, recently internet forums and Facebook have been used to facilitate prostitute-client relations. In recent years, child sex tourism has become an issue at the resort islands of Batam, Bali, Bojonegoro and Tuban.

=== Laos ===
Laos
- Prostitution illegal Buying sex illegal

Prostitution in Laos is regarded as a criminal activity and can be subject to severe prosecution. It is much less common than in neighbouring Thailand. Soliciting for prostitution instead takes place mainly in the city's bars and clubs, although street prostitution also takes place. The visibility of prostitution in Laos belies the practice's illegality. Most prostitutes in Laos are from poor rural Laotian families and the country's ethnic minorities. In addition to these, there are many prostitutes in Laos from China and Vietnam, while some Laotian women go to Thailand to work as sex workers.

=== Malaysia ===
Malaysia
- Prostitution legal Buying sex legal Brothels illegal Procuring illegal Solicitation illegal

Prostitution in Malaysia is legal and widespread in all states except Kelantan. Related activities such as soliciting and brothels are illegal. There were an estimated 150,000 prostitutes in Malaysia in 2014 and that the country's sex trade generated US$963 million.

Kuala Lumpur has a number of red-light districts where street prostitution, massage parlours and brothels can be found. The most upmarket, and probably the best known, is Bukit Bintang. More downmarket is the RLD at Lorong Haji Taib where Indian, Chinese, and local prostitutes operate. Close by is the Chow Kit area where transgender prostitutes ply at night. Jalan Alor, Jalan Hicks, and Jalan Thamibipilly in the Brickfields area are red-light districts. Street walkers operate around Jalan Petaling.

=== Myanmar ===
Myanmar
- Prostitution illegal Buying sex legal

Prostitution in Myanmar (also known as Burma) is illegal. Prostitution is a major social issue that particularly affects women and children.

Burma is a major source of prostitutes (an estimate of 25,000–30,000) in Thailand, with the majority of women trafficked taken to Ranong, bordering south Burma, and Mae Sai, at the eastern tip of Burma. Burmese sex workers also operate in Yunnan, China, particularly the border town of Ruili. The majority of Burmese prostitutes in Thailand are from ethnic minorities. Sixty percent of Burmese prostitutes are under 18 years of age. Burma is also a source country of sex workers and forced labourers in China, Bangladesh, Taiwan, India, Malaysia, Korea, Macau, and Japan. Internal trafficking of women for the purpose of prostitution occurs from rural villages to urban centres, military camps, border towns, and fishing villages.

=== Philippines ===
Philippines
- Prostitution illegal Buying sex legal

Prostitution in the Philippines is illegal, although somewhat tolerated among society, with law enforcement being rare with regards to sex workers. Penalties range up to life imprisonment for those involved in trafficking, which is covered by the Anti-Trafficking in Persons Act of 2003. Prostitution is often available through bars, karaoke bars (also known as KTVs), massage parlors, brothels (also known as casa), street walkers, and escort services.

=== Singapore ===
Singapore
- Prostitution legal Buying sex legal Brothels illegal Procuring illegal Solicitation illegal

Prostitution in Singapore in itself is not illegal, but various prostitution-related activities are criminalised. This includes public solicitation, living on the earnings of a prostitute and maintaining a brothel. In practice, police unofficially tolerate and monitor a limited number of brothels. Prostitutes in such establishments are required to undergo periodic health checks and must carry a health card.

=== Thailand ===
Thailand
- Prostitution legal Buying sex legal Brothels illegal Procuring illegal Solicitation illegal

The law in Thailand does not prohibit the exchange of sexual services between a prostitute and the client. However, associated activities like solicitation, pimping and organizing prostitution in a commercial establishment are illegal.

The precise number of prostitutes is difficult to assess. Estimates vary widely and are subject to national and international controversy. Since the Vietnam War, Thailand has gained international notoriety among travellers from many countries as a sex tourism destination.

=== Timor-Leste ===
Timor-Leste
- Prostitution legal Buying sex legal Brothels illegal Procuring illegal Solicitation illegal

Prostitution in Timor-Leste is legal, but soliciting and third party involvement for profit or to facilitate prostitution is forbidden. Prostitution has become a problem since the country gained independence from Indonesia, especially in the capital, Dili. There are estimated to be 1,688 sex workers in the country.

Law enforcement is weak, but there are occasional clampdowns. Foreign sex workers are usually targeted, and are often deported. Public order laws are also used against prostitutes.

Many of the local prostitutes have entered the sex trade due to poverty and lack of other employment. Foreign prostitutes, especially from Indonesia, China and the Philippines, enter the country on 90-day tourists visas.

=== Vietnam ===
Vietnam
- Prostitution illegal Buying sex illegal

Prostitution in Vietnam is illegal and considered a serious crime. The government has estimated that there were 33,000 prostitutes in the country in 2013, this was 9% higher than the previous year's estimate. Other estimates puts the number at up to 200,000 individuals.

Sex workers organisations report that law enforcement is abusive and corrupt.

== West Asia ==
=== Armenia ===
Armenia
- Prostitution illegal Buying sex legal

In Armenia, prostitution is illegal under administrative law (Article 179.1). Related activities such as running a brothel and pimping are prohibited by the Criminal Code, although there are known to be brothels in the capital, Yerevan, and in Gyumri. According to UNESCO, since the collapse of the Soviet Union in 1991, prostitution in the country has grown. There are about 5,600 women involved in prostitution in Armenia, roughly 1,500 of them are in Yerevan. However, official police figures are far lower, for example 240 in 2012. Police and other safety forces reportedly tolerate prostitution. Many women turn to prostitution due to unemployment.

=== Azerbaijan ===
Azerbaijan
- Prostitution illegal Buying sex legal

Prostitution in Azerbaijan is illegal but common. Prostitution is an administrative offence and punishable by a fine. Keeping a brothel is a criminal offence and punishable by up to 6 years imprisonment. In 2017 a draft law proposing to add heavy fines to the punishment for keeping a brothel was before the National Assembly. It has been estimated that there are 25 054 prostitutes in Azerbaijan, some of which are aged 15 – 18.

=== Bahrain ===
Bahrain
- Prostitution illegal Buying sex legal

Prostitution in Bahrain is illegal but has gained a reputation in the Middle East as major destination for sex tourism. The Bahrain Youth Society for Human Rights reported in 2007 that there were more than 13,500 prostitutes in the country and that the number was rising.

Sex trafficking is a problem in the country.

=== Cyprus ===
Cyprus
- Prostitution legal Buying sex legal Brothels illegal Procuring illegal

The law does not prohibit prostitution itself, but operating brothels, organizing prostitution rings, living off the profits of prostitution, encouraging prostitution or forcing a person to engage in prostitution are illegal activities.

Cyprus has been criticised by the US State Department for failing to control the flow of illegal immigrants and legal to be involved in forced prostitution. Cyprus has gained a reputation for being a major transit point for people smugglers to transport women for the purposes of prostitution. International observers have criticized the government for its lack of action to prevent forced prostitution. The law of Cyprus forbids forced (but not voluntary) prostitution. However, it is believed that many immigrants are hired as barmaids and coerced into prostitution by this method.

==== Northern Cyprus ====
Northern Cyprus
- Prostitution illegal Buying sex legal

The Turkish Republic of Northern Cyprus is only recognised as a separate state by Turkey. Prostitution is illegal, however in nightclubs, "konsomatrices", who sit with, eat with or entertain customers for money are allowed. Konsomatrices are not allowed to have sex with customers, but this restriction is frequently flouted. Enforcement is generally lax, but in July 2006 the Nicosia District Court ordered the first prostitution-related imprisonment. After pleading no contest to the charges, the manager of Mexico nightclub, Mesut Kilicarslan, was sentenced to 15 days in prison for encouraging and profiting from prostitution. By the year's end three more suspects were sentenced to imprisonment for encouraging and profiting from prostitution.

=== Egypt ===
Egypt
- Prostitution illegal Buying sex legal

Prostitution in Egypt is illegal. Police department officially combats prostitution but, like almost all other countries, prostitution exists in Egypt. The prostitutes in Egypt are Egyptian, Russian, and of many other nationalities.

=== Georgia ===
Georgia (country)
- Prostitution illegal Buying sex legal

In Georgia, prostitution is illegal but widespread, particularly in Tbilisi. Many NGO's attribute this to the harsh economic conditions according to the US State Department. Many women from Georgia are part of human trafficking operations to or from countries. Women who are forced to be prostitutes are in Georgia are often from Asia and neighboring European countries.

In 2006 the country incorporated into its domestic law the Protocol to Prevent, Suppress, and Punish Trafficking in Persons, Especially Women and Children, supplementing the UN Convention against Transnational Organized Crime, and the Council of Europe Convention on Action against Trafficking in Human Beings. The punishment for human trafficking in Georgia is 15 years. There is also a special law to protect families of Georgian women who fear reprisals from gang masters of women who refuse to be forced into prostitution abroad.

=== Iran ===
Iran
- Prostitution illegal Buying sex illegal

Prostitution in Iran is illegal, and incurs various punishments ranging from fines and jail terms to execution for repeat offenders. The exact number of prostitutes working in Iran is unknown. However, prostitutes are visible on some street corners of the major cities. Many of them are runaways from poor and broken homes. In 2002, the Iranian newspaper Entekhab estimated that there were close to 85,000 prostitutes in Tehran alone. Prostitution is rampant in Tehran; "the streets are full of working girls ... part of the landscape, blending in with everything else."

=== Iraq ===
Iraq
- Prostitution illegal Buying sex illegal

Prostitution in Iraq is illegal. The Iraqi penal code outlaws prostitution, with the pimp, the prostitute and the client all being liable for criminal penalties.

Many women fleeing the war in Iraq have been forced into prostitution. Some sources claim up to 50 thousand Iraqi refugee women in Syria, many of them widows or orphans, have been forced into prostitution. Sources claim the women are exploited by Gulf Arabs. After the American invasion of Iraq in 2003, private contracting companies used foreign prostitutes smuggled into bases and the Green Zone to use as bribery for other contracts.

=== Israel ===
Israel
- Prostitution legal Buying sex illegal Brothels illegal Procuring illegal

Prostitution in Israel is legal, but the purchase of sex and organised prostitution in the form of brothels and pimping are prohibited. Legislation passed in the Knesset on 31 December 2018 that criminalises the "clients" of prostitutes came into force in May 2020.

The main centre of prostitution in Israel is Tel Aviv. It has been estimated that 62% of the brothels and 48% of the massage parlors in the country are in Tel Aviv. The traditional red-light district of the old bus station area was subjected to a number of raids and closures in 2017, and the area is subject to gentrification.

=== Jordan ===
Jordan
- Prostitution illegal Buying sex legal

Prostitution in Jordan is illegal but occurs. Authorities generally turn a blind eye. Prostitution occurs mainly in the larger cities and around refugee camps. It occurs on brothels, restaurants, night clubs and on the streets. The prostitutes are mainly from Russia, Ukraine, the Philippines, Morocco, Tunisia, Syria, Iraq and Palestine as well as some Jordanians.

In the capital, Amman, there is a red-light district in the Jubaiha (al-jubaiha:الجبيهة) neighbourhood. One of the major streets in Jubeiha has been commonly called "Tallaini Street" meaning "the pick me up street". Local residents have tried to stop prostitution in the area.

=== Kuwait ===
Kuwait
- Prostitution illegal Buying sex legal

Prostitution in Kuwait is illegal, but common. Most of the prostitutes are foreign nationals.

Law enforcement usually deports prostitutes or makes them sign a "good conduct pledge" before release. Those running prostitution rings normally receive jail sentences. There are allegations that some police received bribes from brothels and warn them of upcoming raids.

=== Lebanon ===
Lebanon
- Prostitution legal and regulated Buying sex legal

Prostitution is nominally legal in Lebanon. Officially, Lebanese law requires that brothels be licensed, a process that includes regular testing of workers for disease. However, in an attempt to gradually eliminate legal prostitution in the country, current government policy is to not issue new licenses for brothels. As a result, most prostitution now occurs illegally. The majority of prostitutes in Lebanon emigrate from neighboring Arab countries. Those prostitutes working in adult clubs (called "super night clubs") are closely monitored by the Sûreté Générale—the border control agency.

=== Oman ===
Oman
- Prostitution illegal Buying sex illegal

Prostitution in Oman is illegal and only sex within a legalised marriage is permitted. Women's sex outside legal marriage is criminalised as zina (illegal sex, adultery, fornication). It is women, and not their clients, who are legally penalised for sex work. Living on the proceeds of prostitution is a crime, punishable by a fine and up to three months imprisonment (criminal code article 221). Additionally, any foreigner who commits an act against "public order or good morals" or who does not have a legal source of income may be deported (law 16 of 1995, articles 31[1] and 31[5]).

=== Palestine ===
Palestine
- Prostitution illegal Buying sex legal

Prostitution in Palestine is illegal, under Palestinian Authority law. Ramallah is one of the few outlets for prostitution in Palestine as premarital sex is seen as taboo in the country. A recent report by the UN Development Fund for Women (UNIFEM) and SAWA-All the Women Together Today and Tomorrow, a Palestinian NGO, suggests that an increasing number of women are taking up prostitution in the face of poverty and violence.

=== Qatar ===
Qatar
- Prostitution illegal Buying sex illegal

Prostitution in Qatar is illegal and carries severe punishment of several years in prison. Prostitution normally takes place in bars, nightclubs and hotels. There are occasional clamp-downs and the prostitutes are arrested and deported.

=== Saudi Arabia ===
Saudi Arabia
- Prostitution illegal Buying sex illegal

Prostitution in Saudi Arabia is illegal. Prostitution is punishable by prison and flogging, foreign nationals are also deported after punishment If the parties are also charged with adultery, fornication and sodomy, which can apply to both the prostitute and the client since all sexual activity outside a lawful marriage is illegal, in which case the punishment can be death.

=== Syria ===
Syria
- Prostitution illegal Buying sex illegal

Prostitution in Syria is technically illegal. Beyond the practice of prostitution by an undisclosed number of Syrian women, many women fleeing the war in Iraq are practicing underworld prostitution for living. Some sources claim up to 50 thousand Iraqi refugee women in Syria, many of them are recent widows or orphans with no professional qualification, started prostitution as the only source for earning a living.

=== Turkey ===
Turkey
- Prostitution legal and regulated Buying sex legal Brothels legal and regulated Condoms mandatory

In Turkey, prostitution is legal and regulated. Prostitutes must register and acquire an ID card stating the dates of their health checks. Also it is mandatory for registered prostitutes to have regular health checks for sexually transmitted diseases. The police are allowed to check the authenticity of registered prostitutes to determine whether they have been examined properly and to ensure they see the health authorities if they don't. Men cannot register under this regulation. Most sex workers, however, are unregistered, as local governments have made it policy not to issue new registrations. As a result, most sex workers in Turkey are not registered sex workers, working in violation of the law. Turkey is listed by the UNODC as a top destination for victims of human trafficking.

=== United Arab Emirates ===
United Arab Emirates
- Prostitution illegal Buying sex illegal but de facto tolerated and common

Prostitution in the United Arab Emirates is illegal, but attracts many foreign businessmen as the UAE is slowly gaining a reputation as one of the Middle East's sex tourism destinations. Many of them arrive regularly from the post-Soviet states, Eastern Europe, Far East, Africa, South Asia, and other states of the Middle East.

=== Yemen ===
Yemen
- Prostitution illegal Buying sex legal

Prostitution in Yemen is illegal, but many sex tourists from other Gulf states indulge in what are known as "tourist marriages". Many of these women come from the city of Yaffai where prostitution is a way to put food on the table. The punishment for prostitution is three years imprisonment.

A lot of prostitution takes place in hotels in the capital, Sana'a. Some hotels have "house prostitutes" and it is possible to book a room and a woman to be ready on arrival.

== See also ==
- Prostitution by country
- Prostitution law
