= Sombre =

Sombre or somber may refer to:

== Music ==
=== Albums ===
- Somber, a 2023 EP by Belle Mariano
- Sombre (mixtape) or its title track, by La Fouine, 2018

=== Compositions ===
- Sombre (composition), by Kaija Saariaho, 2012
- Sombre, on volume 1 of Steps piano cycle series by Peter Seabourne, 2001-4

=== Songs ===
- "Somber", by Art of Anarchy from The Madness, 2017
- "Somber", by Axium from Matter of Time, 2002
- "Somber Song", by Steve Davis from Portrait in Sound, 2000
- "Somber", by Brennan Savage featuring Bobby Raps, 2021
- "Somber", by Leah McFall, 2018
- "Somber", by Old Wharf featuring Devin Duarte, member of Worm Shepherd
- "Somber", by Violet Days featuring Morgxn, 2018
- "Sombre", by Kaaris from Or Noir Part II, 2014

== People ==
- Begum Samru (c. 1753–1836), born Joanna Nobilis Sombre, Indian ruler of Sardhana
- Fauve (musician), pseudonym Sombre
- David Ochterlony Dyce Sombre (1808–1851), Anglo-Indian politician
- Walter Reinhardt Sombre (c. 1725–1778), European adventurer and mercenary, husband of Begum Samru and great-grandfather of David Ochterlony Dyce Sombre

== Places ==
- Lafage-sur-Sombre, French commune
- Sombre (stream), in south-central France

== Other uses ==
- Sombre (film), 1998
- Sombre, a spoof of Hombre (film), 1967
- Sombre (role-playing game), 2011

== See also ==
- Sombrero (disambiguation)
- Somberi, a 2008 Indian Telugu-language film
- "Somberi", a song featured in the 2024 film Kandor Mane Kathe, starring Naveen Sajju
- Sombero, a 1953 film starring Alma Beltran
- Sombr (born 2005), American singer-songwriter
- Sumru
