= Mercenaries in India =

Mercenaries in India were fighters, primarily peasants, who came from India and abroad, to fight for local rulers in India in the medieval period. This mercenary work became an important source of income for some communities.

During the 16th and 17th centuries, a number of mercenaries, arriving from several countries found employment in India. Some of the mercenaries emerged to become independent rulers.

== Purbiyas and Pindaris ==
In the medieval period, Purbiya mercenaries from Bihar and Eastern Uttar Pradesh were a common feature in Kingdoms in Western and Northern India. They were also later recruited by the Marathas and the British. They also played a prominent role in the Indian Rebellion of 1857.

In the 18th and 19th centuries, the Pindaris were irregular military men who were recruited by the elites of the Mughal Empire and the Deccan sultanates, and later by the Maratha Confederacy. They were disbanded in the Third Anglo-Maratha War.

== African mercenaries in India ==
The Siddi (pronounced [sɪd̪d̪iː]), also known as Sidi, Siddhi, Sheedi, or Habshi, are an ethnic group inhabiting India and Pakistan. Some were merchants, sailors, indentured servants, slaves and mercenaries. The Habshi or Siddis are thought to have arrived in India in 628 AD at the Bharuch port. Several others followed with the first Arab Islamic conquest of the subcontinent in 712 AD. The latter group are believed to have been soldiers with Muhammad bin Qasim's Arab army, and were called Zanjis.

Some Siddis escaped slavery to establish communities in forested areas, and some also established the small Siddi principalities of Janjira State on Janjira Island and Jafarabad State in Kathiawar as early as the twelfth century. A former alternative name of Janjira was Habshan (i.e., land of the Habshis). In the Delhi Sultanate period prior to the rise of the Mughals in India, Jamal-ud-Din Yaqut was a prominent Siddi slave-turned-nobleman who was a close confidant of Razia Sultana (1205–1240 CE). Although this is disputed, he may also have been her lover, but contemporary sources do not indicate that this was necessarily the case.

Siddis were also brought as slaves by the Deccan Sultanates. Several former slaves rose to high ranks in the military and administration, the most prominent of which was Malik Ambar.

== European mercenaries in India ==
Thousands of Europeans took up service at the courts of rulers all over India. These mercenaries for the most part came from the margins of their respective societies. During the first war between Bahamani Sultanate and Vijayanagara Empire, launched in 1365 by Muhammad Shah I, both sides imported their artillery guns and employed Turkish and European gunners to man them.

European mercenaries served in the courts of Indian rulers for 300 years, beginning with the large-scale defections of soldiers from Portuguese Goa in the 16th century, followed by a series of defections of British soldiers and laymen from the British East India Company bridgehead at Surat in the 17th century. During Portuguese explorer Vasco da Gama's first historic journey to India in 1498, he observed that there were Italian mercenaries in the employ of various Rajahs on the Malabar coast. Two of da Gama's own crewmen had left him to join the Italians in the service of a Malabar Rajah for higher wages.

Portuguese historian João de Barros stated that there were at least 2,000 Portuguese fighting in the armies of various Indian princes in 1565. Among these mercenaries included the indigenous Goan Christian and Bombay East Indian Christian soldiers and sailors. The Maratha ruler Shivaji employed many Portuguese and hundreds of Goans and Bombay East Indians in his navy, until they were persuaded by the colonial authorities in Goa to desert. They were generally sought after as artillery experts by the Mughals and Marathas. When the Mughals complained to the Portuguese viceroy António de Melo e Castro about the Portuguese soldiers serving under the Marathas, the latter responded with a letter stating he had no control over the Portuguese and native Christian officers in Shivaji's army, just as he had no control over the mercenaries serving in the Mughal and other armies.

During the reign of Mughal Emperor Shah Jahan, so many Europeans took up service at the Mughal Army that a distinct suburb was built for them outside Delhi named Firingipura (Foreigners' Town). Its inhabitants included Portuguese, French and English mercenaries, many of whom had converted to Islam. These mercenaries formed a special Firingi (Foreigners') regiment, under the command of a Frenchman named Farrashish Khan. Shah Alam II gave the German mercenary Walter Reinhardt Sombre a large estate in the Doab, north of Delhi. Sombre settled in the estate with his wife Farzana Zeb un-Nissa, also known as Begum Samru, and made the village of Sardhana his capital. The ruling class of this principality was drawn from an assortment of Mughal noblemen, and 200 French Indian and Central European mercenaries, many of whom had converted to Islam. Sombre was succeeded after his death by his wife who took command of his mercenary troops and became the ruler of Sardhana, earning the distinction of being the only Roman Catholic ruler in India. Among these mercenaries was John-Augustus Gottlieb Cohen, a German Jewish mercenary who was the father of Urdu poet, Farasu.

There were many mercenaries working in the armies of the Deccan Sultanates who controlled much of central and southern India. One of the most prominent mercenaries in the Adil Shahi court was Gonçalo Vaz Coutinho, a Portuguese former landowner in Goa, who was imprisoned there on a murder charge before escaping to Bijapur in 1542. There he converted to Islam with his wife and children, and was given lands with great revenues by Ibrahim Adil Shah I. A Portuguese Jewish gunner by the name Sancho Pires, defected in similar circumstances to the Ahmadnagar Sultanate in 1530. Pires converted to Islam and took the name Firanghi Khan; acquiring a position of great influence in the Nizam Shahi court.

Many British renegades defected to the service of the Mughals and Deccan Sultanates during the 17th century, as in the case of Joshua Blackwell, a British East India Company official who in 1649 converted to Islam, and took up service in the Mughal army. Most of these renegades, like the trumpeter Robert Trulleye, however, went into the service of the Deccan Sultanates of Bijapur and Golconda. In 1654, 23 British East India Company servants deserted Surat in a single mass break-out. In the 1670s, the authorities uncovered an active network of covert recruiting agents in British Bombay. By the 1680s, the increasing defections of British soldiers and East India Company servants led Charles II of England, to issue an order calling back all Englishmen in the employ of Indian princes.

During the Indian Rebellion of 1857, a British convert to Islam named Abdullah Beg was one of the most active insurgents in old Delhi against British rule. Beg was a former Company soldier, who upon the arrival of the mutineer sepoys on 11 May, self-identified with them and virtually became a leader and advisor to the rebel forces in Delhi. He was last seen manning the rebel artillery along with another British defector and Muslim convert, Sergeant-Major Gordon. On account of his faith, Gordon was spared during the massacre of Christians at the outbreak of the uprising. In due course Gordon was taken to Delhi, where he manned the guns on the northern side of the city walls.

== Outside India ==
=== In Ukraine ===
In 2024, hundreds of Indians were reported to be fighting for Russia against Ukraine as mercenaries in the Russia-Ukraine war. Indian Prime Minister Narendra Modi raised this issue with Vladimir Putin during his visit to Russia in July 2024.

=== In Lebanon ===
In 1981, hundreds of Indian mercenaries, notably of Sikh origin but with shaved faces and Muslim names, were also reported to be fighting in Beirut.

=== In Zimbabwe ===
In 2024, Jorum Gumbo, the advisor of Zimbabwean President Emmerson Mnangagwa, told that they hired hundreds of Indian mercenaries from Mozambique.

== Notable mercenaries ==
=== European ===
Mercenaries	Background
Anthony Pohlmann	Hanoverian who served in the armies of the Daulat Scindia and British East India Company
Benoît de Boigne	French military adventurer who made his fortune and name in India.
John Hessing	Dutch mercenary who served the Maratha Confederacy
Fernão Lopes	16th century Portuguese soldier who defected to the Adil Shahi general, Rasul Khan.
Claude Martin	French army officer in India
Jean-Philippe de Bourbon-Navarre	French mercenary and progenitor of the Bourbon lineage in Bhopal
Pierre Cuillier-Perron	French military adventurer in India
Michel Joachim Marie Raymond	French General in Nizam's military and the founder of Gunfoundry Hyderabad, Hyderabad State.
Walter Reinhardt Sombre	French mercenary and husband of Begum Samru, ruler of Sardhana, a principality near Meerut and also served the Faujdars of Purnea
George Thomas	Irish mercenary who was active in India during the 18th century
Jean-Baptiste Ventura	Italian mercenary and adventurer who served the Sikh Empire in the Punjab
Jean-François Allard	French mercenary who served in the Sikh Armies under Maharaja Ranjit Singh
John Holmes	British mercenary who served in the Sikh Armies under Maharaja Ranjit Singh
Claude Auguste Court	French mercenary who served in the Sikh Armies under Maharaja Ranjit Singh
Paolo Avitabile	Italian mercenary who served in the Sikh Armies under Maharaja Ranjit Singh
François Henri Mouton	French mercenary who served in the Sikh Armies under Maharaja Ranjit Singh
Alexander Gardner	American mercenary who served in the Sikh Armies under Maharaja Ranjit Singh
Josiah Harlan	American mercenary who served in the Sikh Armies under Maharaja Ranjit Singh
Johann Martin Honigberger	Austrian traveler who was a doctor & production supervisor for the Sikh Armies under Maharaja Ranjit Singh
Jean Baptiste Joseph Gentil	French mercenary who served in the armies of the Nawabs of Bengal, Nawabs of Awadh and the Mughal Empire
René-Marie Madec	French mercenary who served in the armies of the Nawabs of Bengal, Nawabs of Awadh, the Mughal Empire, the Jats of Bharatpur State and the Rohilla

=== Afghan/Central Asian ===
Mercenaries	Background
Ahmad Baksh Khan	Bukharan mercenary who founded the Princely State of Loharu
Dost Mohammed Khan	Afghan mercenary and founder of the Princely State of Bhopal
