= Sombra =

Sombra (Spanish for shadow) may refer to:

== Arts and entertainment ==
- La Sombra (band), a Tejano band
- Sombra (Overwatch), a character in the 2016 video game and the subject of a related alternate reality game
- the title character of Lucía Sombra, a 1971–1972 Mexican telenovela
- the title character of Don Segundo Sombra, a 1926 novel, and the 1969 film adaptation of the same title
- King Sombra, a villain from the My Little Pony: Friendship Is Magic animated television series

== People ==
- Alan Sombra (born 1994), Argentine footballer
- Martín Sombra (1938–2025), Colombian FARC militant
- La Sombra and Andrade El Idolo, ring names of Mexican professional wrestler Manuel Andrade Oropeza (born 1989)

== Other uses ==
- Sombra (company), a Ukrainian software development and information technology consulting company
- Sombra, Ontario, Canada, an unincorporated community

== See also ==
- Sombras (album), a 1965 album by the Mexican singer Javier Solís, also a track on the album
- Somber or Sombre (disambiguation)
