= Basilica of Our Lady of Graces =

Church in Uttar Pradesh, India

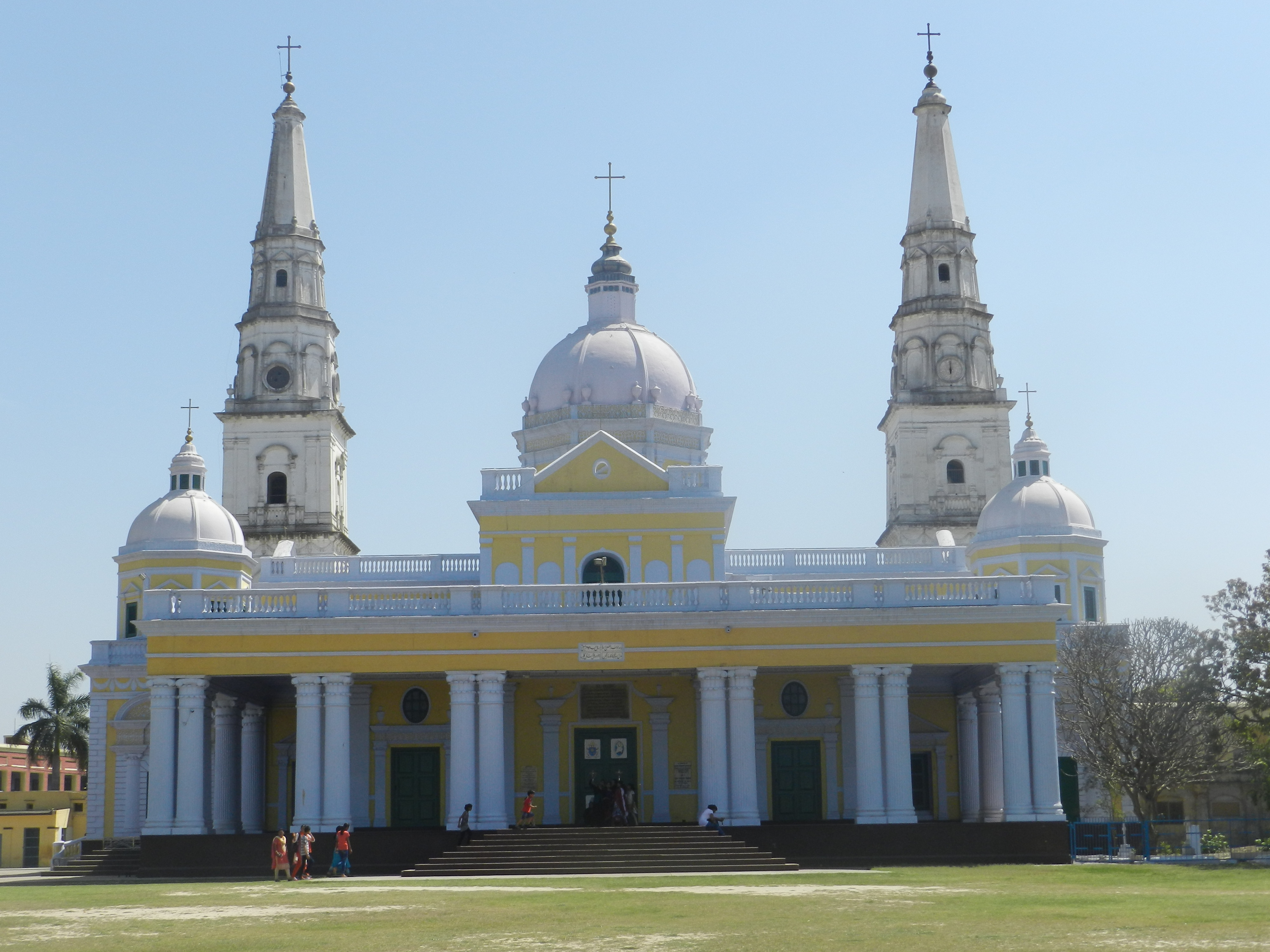

- Location within Uttar Pradesh Location within India

Religion
- Affiliation: Roman Catholic
- Ecclesiastical or organisational status: Minor basilica
- Patron: Our Lady of Graces

Location
- Location: Sardhana, Uttar Pradesh, India
- Coordinates: 29.15°N 77.61°E

Architecture
- Groundbreaking: 1809
- Completed: 1822
- Materials: Marble

The Basilica of Our Lady of Graces is a Roman Catholic church in Sardhana, 19 km north-west of Meerut, in the Indian state of Uttar Pradesh.

== Overview ==
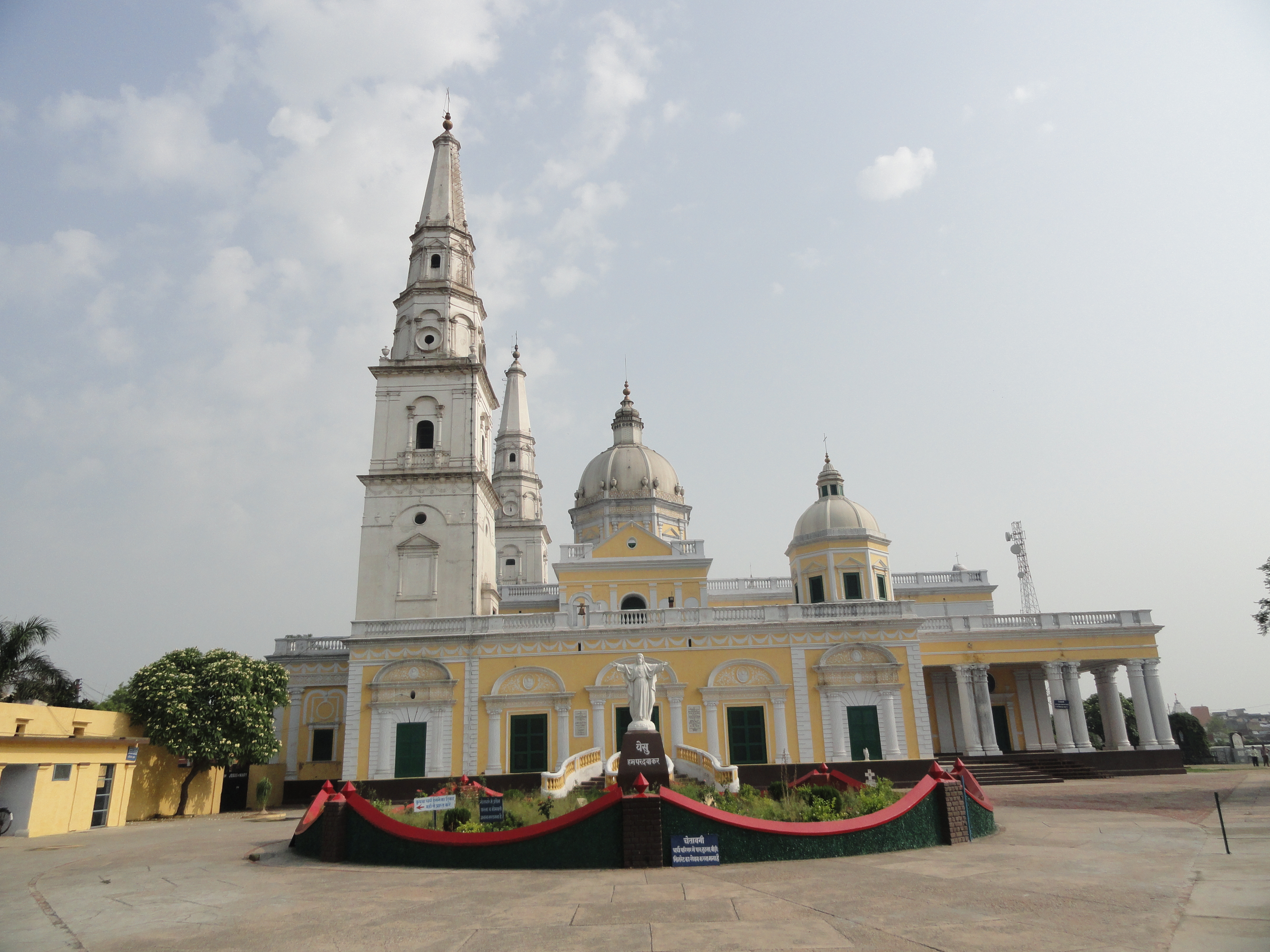
View of the exterior

The Basilica of Our Lady of Graces, also known as Churches among the Churches, is dedicated to the Virgin Mary. The church was built by Begum Samru, a Muslim Nautch girl of 14 who married a European mercenary soldier, Walter Reinhardt Sombre. Samru converted to Roman Catholicism in 1781 and adopted the name Joanna Nobilis. She is regarded as the only Catholic ruler in India, and ruled the Principality of Sardhana in the 18th and 19th centuries. The church is the largest in North India.

== History ==
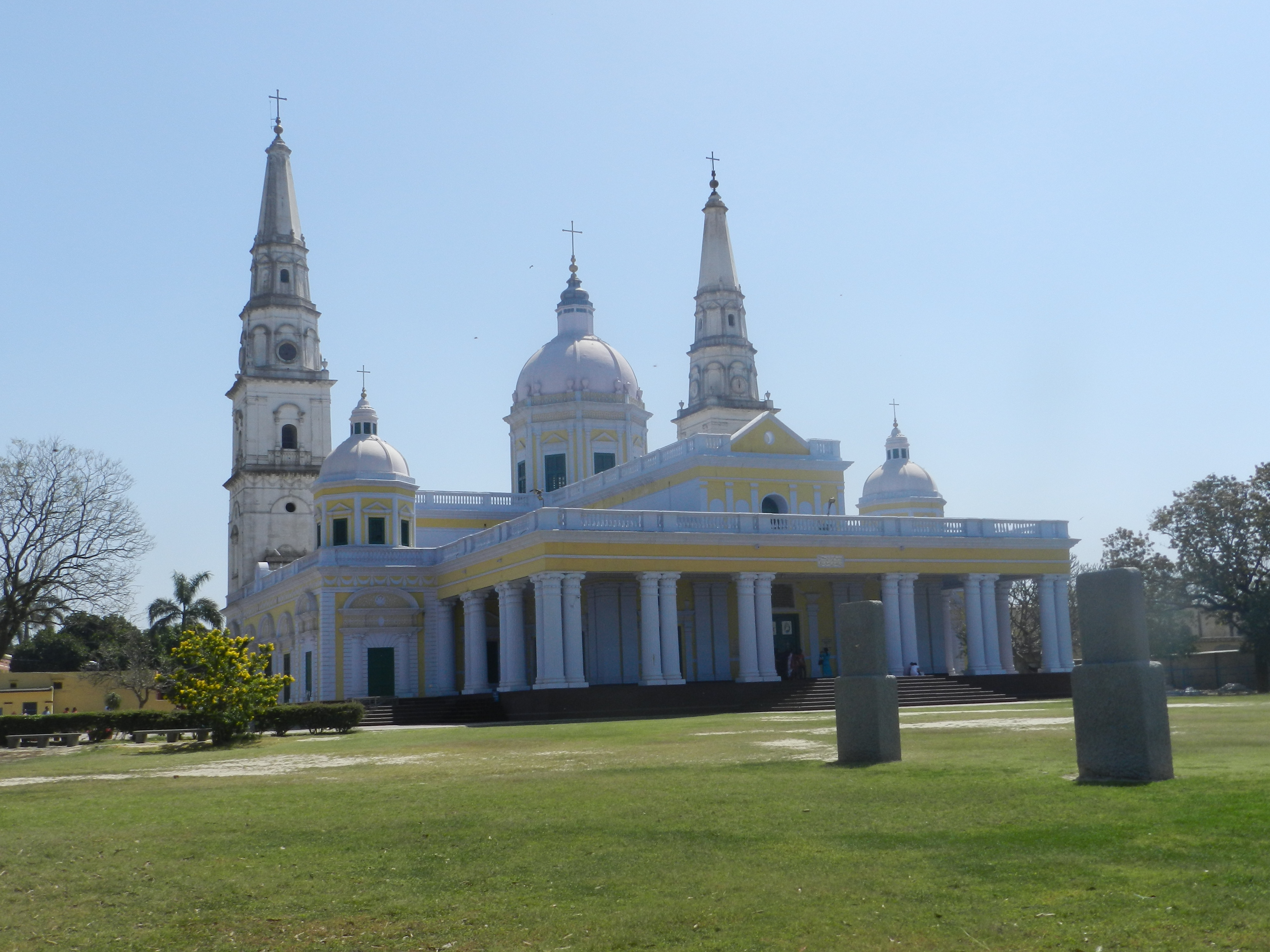
Side profile of the basilica

Begum Samru inherited the Jagir of Sardhana after her husband's death in 1778. Subsequently, she decided to construct a church at Sardhana, dedicated to the Virgin Mary. The construction of the church cost Rs. 400,000, a huge amount in those days. Top masons were paid the equivalent of 25 p. per day, and the labourers in shells. Two huge lakes near the church are the result of the mud that was removed to supply the building material for the church. Two dates are often given for the beginning of the church - Mr. K. M. Munshi, the noted historian, gives the date as 1809. Many are inclined to follow this date because a Latin inscription over the main door of the church puts its dedication in 1822. The other date, given by Fr. Keegan in his study of the Begum, is 1820.

Begum Samru requested the Pope to make Sardhana an independent circumscription. In 1834, Pope Gregory XVI established the Apostolic Vicariate of Sardhana from the Apostolic Vicariate of Tibet-Hindustan and appointed Bishop Julius Caesar Scotti as the Apostolic Vicar. The church was the cathedral of Sardhana. However, Scotti was the only vicar apostolic, and eventually, the Apostolic Vicariate of Sardhana was merged into the Apostolic Vicariate of Agra.

== Architecture ==
The architect of the church was Antonio Reghellini, an Italian from the city of Vicenza. The church is based upon St. Peter's Basilica in Rome with a touch of Palladio and some Indian architectural influence. The altar and its surrounds are of marble set with coloured stones. Much of the rest of the interior is also in marble, and everything is of the very highest craftsmanship. It is illuminated from an octagon set in the dome, from which the sun streams in.

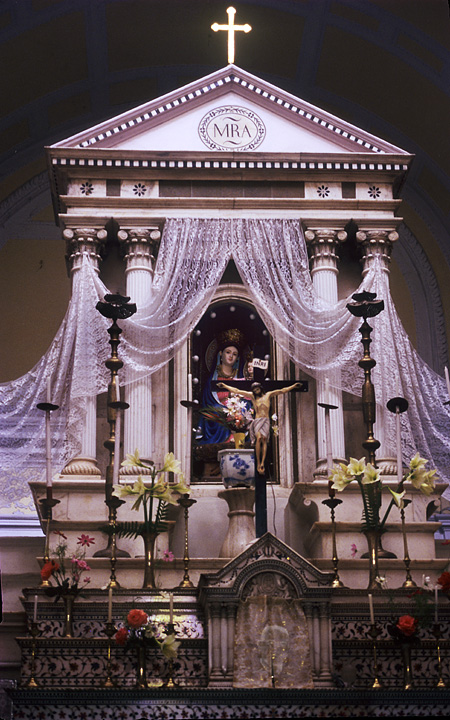
Main altar of the basilica

Reghellini completed the church in 11 years. The church is noted for the use of semi-precious stone work, a Greek colonnaded veranda, an elevated altar with a stained glass dome and there are two spires and three Roman domes that add to the building's grandeur. Near the sanctuary is a majestic 18-feet-high edifice over the Begum's tomb. Carved by the Italian sculptor Adamo Tadolini and transported to Sardhana from Italy to Kolkata by ship and by boats and bullock carts from there, it depicts Begum Sumru on the throne, smoking a hookah with Europeans and Indians in audience. It depicts her with a scroll from Emperor Shah Alam II bestowing upon her the fiefdom of Sardhana after her husband's death. Also depicted are her adopted son David Dyce Sombre and her diwan, Rae Singh who was the great-grandfather of Motilal Nehru.

== Upgrade to Minor Basilica ==
On 13 December 1961 Pope John XXIII decided to upgrade the church to the status of Minor Basilica, a dignity that is bestowed rarely and only on churches that are both historically famous and beautiful. The church is only one of 23 minor basilicas in India and is the only minor basilica in North India.
