= Madonna of Graces with Two Saints =

1522 fresco by Perugino

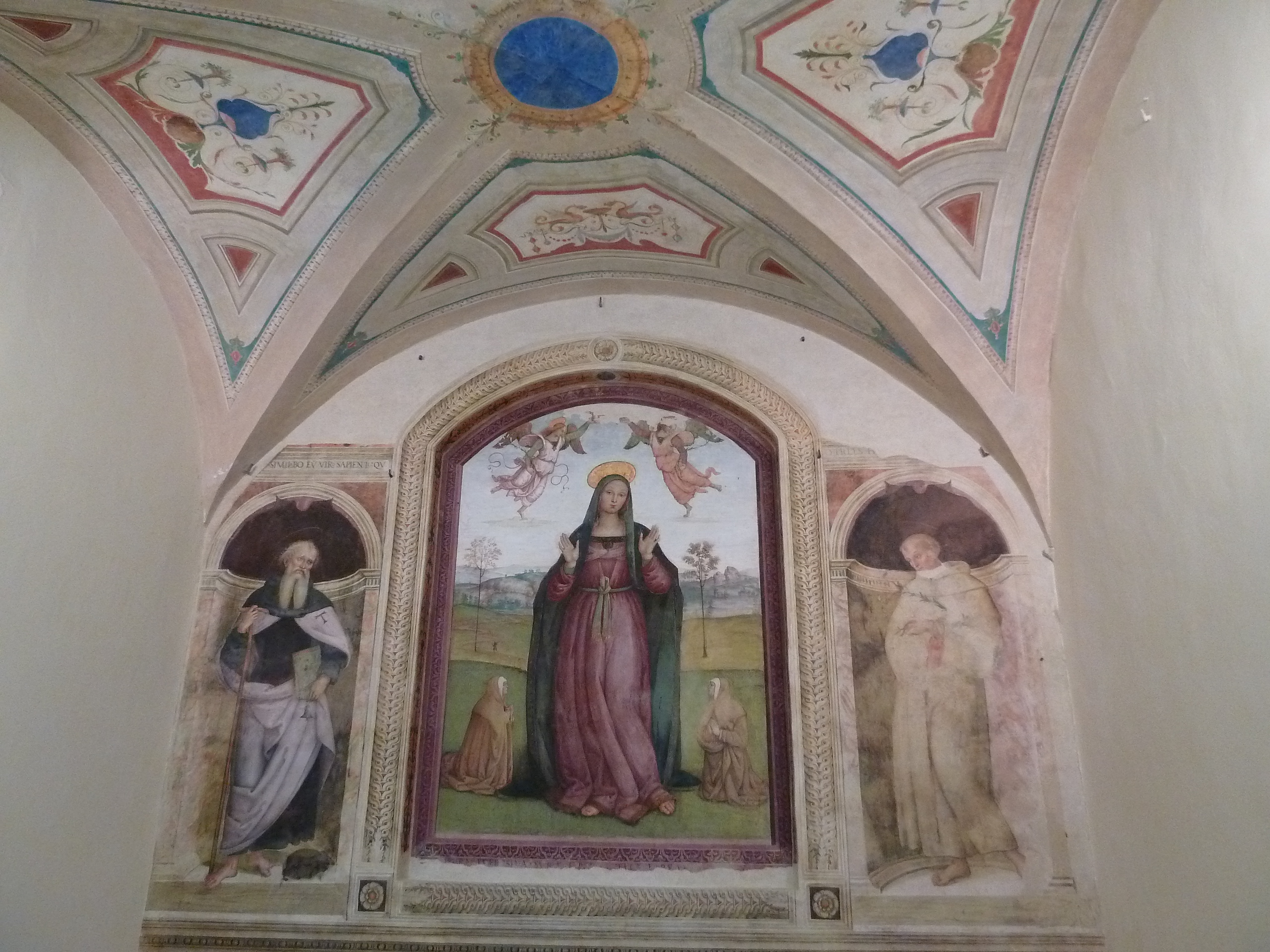
Madonna of Graces with Two Saints (1522) by Perugino

'Madonna of Graces with Two Saints is a 1522 fresco painting by Perugino. Its central figure shows Mary as Our Lady of Graces, flanked by Antony the Great and Antony of Padua. It is in a side chapel of the church of Sant’Agnese, the Poor Clares convent in Perugia. It was commissioned a year before the painter's death by Eufrasia and Teodora, two nuns of the convent.
