= David Ochterlony Dyce Sombre =

Anglo-Indian politician (1808–1851)

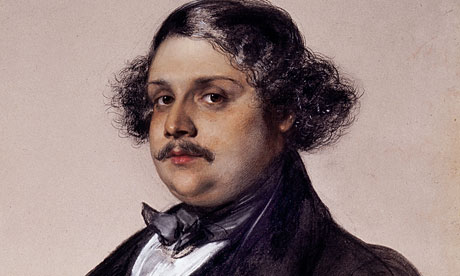

Member of Parliament for Sudbury
- In office July 1841 – April 1842

Personal details
- Born: 18 December 1808 Sardhana, Kingdom of Awadh, India
- Died: 1 July 1851 (aged 42) West End of London, England

David Ochterlony Dyce Sombre (18 December 1808 – 1 July 1851), also known as D. O. Dyce Sombre and David Dyce Sombre, was an Anglo-Indian politician recognized to be the first person of Indian descent to be elected to the British Parliament. He stood as a candidate in the constituency of Sudbury and became its MP in July 1841, but was removed from his seat in April 1842 after being found guilty of "gross, systematic and extensive bribery" during his campaign. He was named after the British Resident at Delhi, David Ochterlony.

== Lineage and background ==
David Ochterlony Dyce Sombre was the great-grandson of Walter Reinhardt Sombre (c. 1725–1778), a mercenary soldier who lived for many years in India. Walter Reinhardt Sombre had two wives, both of whom were Indian Muslim women; the senior wife is known only as Badi Bibi ("senior lady"), while the second wife was Begum Samru (c. 1753–1836). The name "Samru" is the local corruption of the name "Sombre", and Begum, a Kashmiri Muslim by birth, converted in 1781 to the Catholic faith. A wealthy woman, she was left with no surviving children or grandchildren in her old age. Her husband had only one son by Badi Bibi, his first wife. The boy, born in 1764, was initially named Zafar Yab Khan, and was raised more or less as a Muslim by his mother in a mixed household. However, he accepted Catholic baptism in 1781 at the age of 17, three years after the death of his Catholic father. Incidentally, his widowed stepmother, Begum Samru, also accepted Catholic baptism at the same time. Upon his baptism, the young man's name was changed to "Walter Balthazzar Reinhardt," or (according to a biography of his grandson) "Aloysius Balthazzar Reinhardt."

Khan married Julia Anne (or Juliana) Le Fevre (1770–1815), the daughter of a captain in Begum Samru's service. Julia Anna was also known as Juliana, as Madame Reybaud and as Bhai Begum. The couple had two children, a son, Aloysius Reinhardt, who died young and is buried in the Akbar Church in Agra, and a daughter, Julia Anne (or Juliana). Khan died due to the effects of cholera in 1799. He was survived by his wife (who died in 1815) and their daughter, also named Juliana (born 1787/1789 – died 1820), who in 1803 married George Alexander Dyce. Dyce was the illegitimate Anglo-Indian son of a Major General Dyce by an Indian woman; he died in April 1838 and was buried at Fort William, Calcutta). The couple had several children, of whom four are mentioned in subsequent papers and histories:

1. David Ochterlony (b. 18 December 1808)
2. George Archibald (b. 1 August 1810, died within a year)
3. Anna Maria (b. 24 December 1813) married John Rose Troup, a former East India Company general
4. Georgiana (b. 2 September 1807; alternatively 1815–1867). She married an Italian mercenary soldier named Paolo Solaroli (1796–1878) who was later to become a wealthy and high-ranking aristocrat. Born into a humble family from Novara, Piedmont, Paolo Solaroli joined the Sardinian army. He later became an officer and diplomat who was ennobled in the 1840s by Carlo Alberto of Sardinia, became Baron, by 1864, and was elevated to the title of Marchese di Briona in 1867 by Vittorio Emmanuele II. He had descendants and left them an enormous estate at his death. His castle was acquired in 1864 by the government. In the 1840s, he was styled Baron Paolo Solaroli, but was referred to by his sister-in-law, Anna Maria (Ochterlony) Troup, and her lawyers as Peter Solaroli.

Begum Samroo looked after David, who was brought up after his mother's death in 1820 as the Begum's son and heir, and was selected by Begum Samru to succeed to her vast estates. He thereupon added the surname "Sombre" to his existing names and came to be known as David Ochterlony Dyce Sombre.

== Religious position ==
Although educated by Protestant missionaries, David Ochterlony Dyce Sombre was brought up as a Catholic. He added Sombre to his name on being formally nominated by the Begam as her sole heir and successor. She transferred to him her wealth, and the administration of her principality but her attempts to have him accepted by the British as ruler on her death were to no avail.

When the Begam died in 1836, the British took possession of Sardhana, all the arms which she had brought from them to equip her army, and the lands of Badshapur, which were her private property. They also failed to honour undertakings to continue the many pensions paid from the revenue. David's attempts to have these wrongs rectified were unsuccessful, although compensation for the arms was eventually granted long after his death. He was embroiled in attempts by his father to grab his fortune. His personal life was marked by extravagant spending – gambling, womanising, and even the occasional pimping – to please European friends and better-off Anglo-Indian friends such as Sir Charles Metcalfe Ochterlony.

== Marriage ==
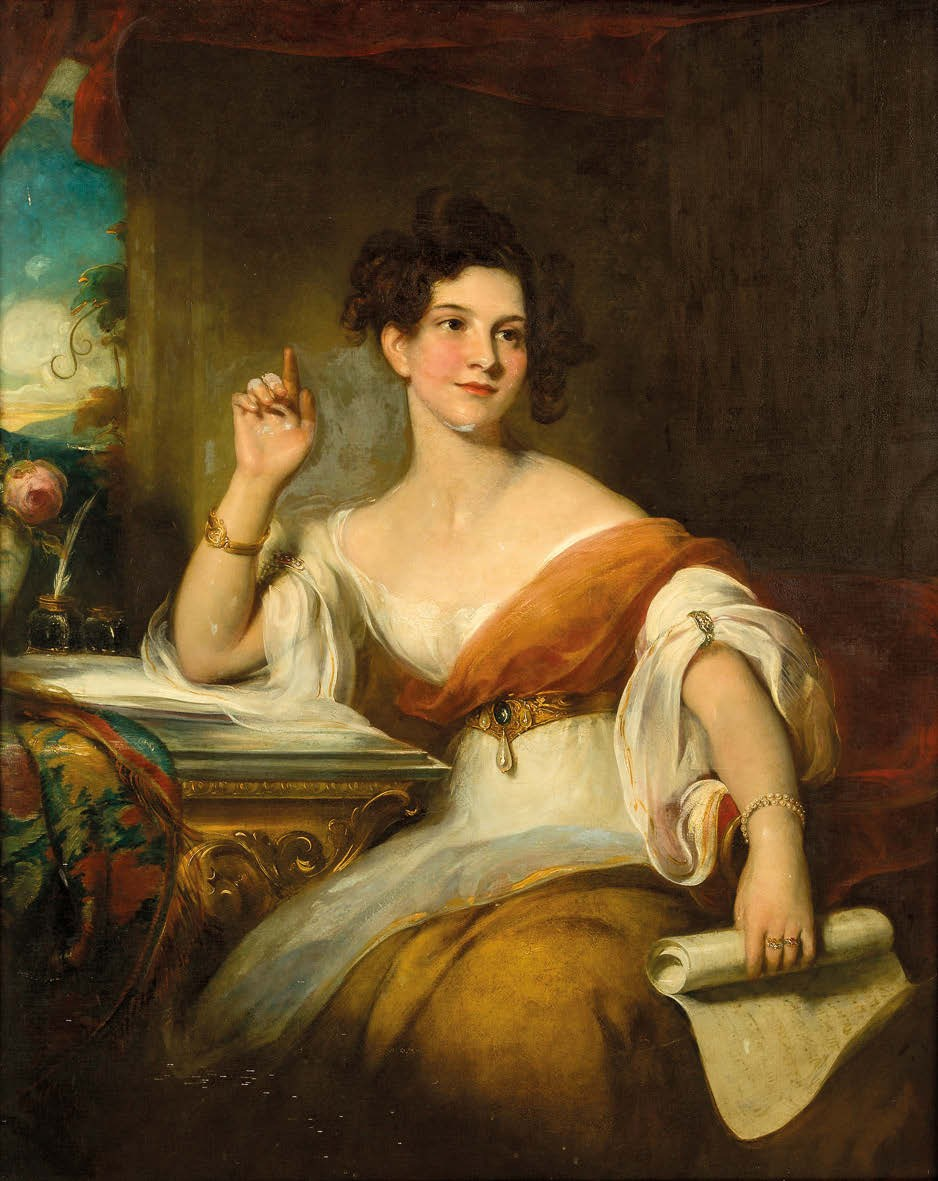
The Honourable Mary Anne Jervis, at age 18

After a visit to China, David set out for England and the Grand Tour of Europe. On 26 September 1840, he married the Honourable Mary Anne Jervis, third daughter of the 2nd Viscount St Vincent, his only daughter by his second wife, described as "accomplished singer, dancer, and composer" and also as an associate of the Duke of Wellington. The marriage took place despite quarrels over his fiancée's social life and the religious affiliation of their future (and never born) children.

== Member of Parliament ==
In the 1841 general election, he stood as one of the two Whig candidates at Sudbury in Suffolk. Dyce Sombre spent over £3,000 on the election, and the Whigs narrowly won both seats. However, opponents filed an election petition, alleging corruption. In April 1842, the elections of both Whigs were declared void due to "gross, systematic and extensive bribery".

== Marital breakdown and alleged insanity ==
Dyce Sombre accused his wife of adultery with various men, including her father.

In 1843, Mrs Dyce Sombre alleged that he was insane, with the support and consent of his sisters, Mrs Anna May Troup (1812–1867) and Baroness Georgiana Solaroli (1815–1867), and their husbands. On 8 August he was found insane and placed under restraint.

== Escape, medical reports, and death ==
In September of that year, David escaped his guards and fled to France, where an attempt to have him extradited failed. Doctors all over Europe examined him and found he was perfectly sane, but his attempts to reverse the judgement were brushed aside. He managed to obtain part of his estate with an allowance of £4,000 deducted for his wife. Meanwhile, he travelled from one end of Europe to the other. Finally, with a change of government, there seemed a chance of success. He returned to England with indemnity from arrest. But a few days before the case was due to be heard, he died suddenly in excruciating agony from a septic foot on 1 July 1851.

He was buried at once in an unmarked grave in Kensington though he requested that his body be returned to India to be buried in Sardhana. His will, which provided for the establishment of a school in Sardhana, was contested by his estranged wife, whom he had disinherited, on the grounds that he was still insane. She won the case sometime around 1856. Later on, she also became known as Lady Forester, through her marriage to George Weld-Forester, 3rd Baron Forester on 8 November 1862. The former Mrs Dyce Sombre died childless in 1893, and her fortune presumably passed to the Weld-Forester family.

Parliament of the United Kingdom
| Preceded by George Tomline; Joseph Bailey | Member of Parliament for Sudbury; 1841–1842; With: Frederick Meynell Villiers | Constituency disfranchised for corruption |
