= Santa Maria la Carità =

- Comune
- Comune di Santa Maria la Carità
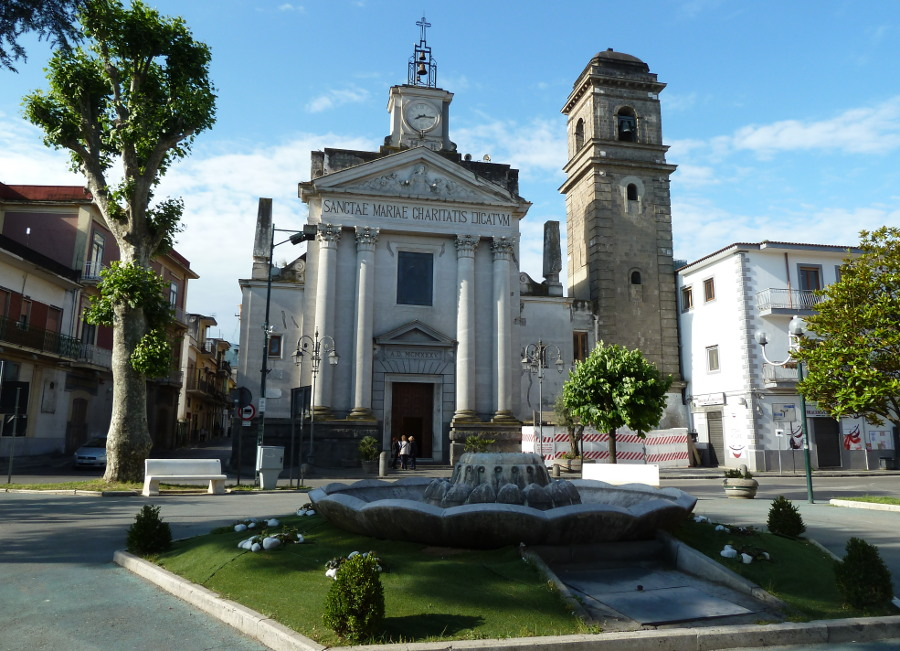

- Coat of arms

- Location within Italy Location within Campania
- Coordinates: 40°43′N 14°31′E
- Country: Italy
- Region: Campania
- Metropolitan city: Naples (NA)
- Frazioni: Petraro

Government
  - Mayor: Giosuè D'Amora

Area
  - Total: 3.98 km^{2} (1.54 sq mi)
- Elevation: 16 m (52 ft)

Population (31 July 2022)
  - Total: 11,617
  - Density: 2,920/km^{2} (7,560/sq mi)
- Demonym: Sammaritani
- Time zone: UTC+1 (CET)
  - Summer (DST): UTC+2 (CEST)
- Postal code: 80050
- Dialing code: 081
- ISTAT code: 063090
- Patron saint: St. Mary
- Saint day: 21 November and 2 July
- Website: Official website

Santa Maria la Carità (Neapolitan: Santa Maria 'a Carità) is a comune (municipality) of 11,617 inhabitants in the Metropolitan City of Naples, in the Italian region of Campania, located about 25 kilometres (16 mi) southeast of Naples. It is situated in the Stabiae-Vesuvian plain, in the Sarno valley.

Its urban structure is radial, having its center in Piazza Borrelli, where the main church is located. The name reflects the worship of the patron saint, Santa Maria delle Grazie. The addition of "la Carità" probably serves as a local designation to distinguish it from other places with similar names. This addition also carries connotations of charity and benevolence.

The town boasts historical and cultural landmarks, contributing to its appeal as a tourist destination. Additionally, Santa Maria la Carità enjoys a strategic location, benefiting from proximity to both natural attractions, such as Mount Vesuvius, the Gulf of Naples and the Amalfi Coast, and urban centers, including Naples and Salerno.

== History ==
=== Ancient Age ===
The fertile Vesuvian plain, where Santa Maria la Carità is located, was an intensely cultivated and inhabited area already in ancient times. The first news about the town dates back to around 900 BC, when the Oscan people began to settle in the territory. These were rural settlements that arose in an area of intense commercial traffic. Starting from the settlement of the Samnites (around 500 BC) a whole series of bloody wars and battles took place in the area, in which armies of different origins, roaming the Sarno plains, raided the countryside in search of food supplies.

In 340 BC, following the Samnite Wars, the Romans conquered the area. Within the territory of the comune, several villas dating back to the 1st century BC have been discovered, testifying to the constant development of the area, which by this period was surrounded by important towns such as Stabiae and Pompeii. The eruption of Mount Vesuvius in 79 AD abruptly ended this prosperity. The settlements in the comune, like the other well-known surrounding towns, met a tragic fate and the area was abandoned for many decades. Resettlement began before the end of Roman rule, but it occurred on a much smaller scale than before.

=== Middle Ages ===
After the fall of the Western Roman Empire several peoples settled in the area. Starting from 574 AD, the Lombards invaded Southern Italy, arriving in the Sarno plain. At the end of the first millennium (950 AD), after centuries of relative peace where the area remained mostly rural, the Lombards began to build military watchtowers to defend themselves from the threat posed by the Saracens, who had unsuccessfully tried to reach Amalfi from here. Precisely one of these towers would later become the bell tower of the church of Santa Maria la Carità. Tradition has it that the ancient road connecting the river Sarno to the Lattari Mountains passed under the bell tower: the large openings at the base of the tower, which still exist today, would have had precisely this functional purpose. In 1318 King Robert of Anjou delimits the Cancelleria fiefdom by establishing the church of Santa Maria la Carità as the boundary term.

=== Early Modern Period ===
Starting from around 1450 there were numerous attempts to reclaim the areas of the comune which were marshy and caused numerous deaths from malaria, but only in 1855 King Ferdinand II of Bourbon established the "Amministrazione delle Bonificazioni". During the Bourbon period, the area of Santa Maria la Carità was part of the Kingdom of the Two Sicilies. Urbanization in the area gradually increased with population growth and the development of agricultural activities. During this time, the importance of the local church continued to grow. The last outbreak of war before the Great War arose in 1860 during the Italian Unification, when numerous anti-Garibaldian Sammaritani, after violent clashes, turned to brigandage as they were unable to assert their loyalty to the Bourbon sovereigns in any other way.

=== Modern Period ===
The world wars brought a significant number of casualties among the young men of Santa Maria la Carità: Piazza Borrelli, which is the main square of the town, is dedicated to the memory of Ernesto Borrelli, a young decorated pilot who died fighting over the Mediterranean on March 27th, 1943. Starting from the 1950s, Santa Maria la Carità began to develop as an autonomous municipality. Demographic growth and industrialization contributed to the transformation of the urban and social fabric. Despite modernization, agriculture remained an important sector for the local economy. In 1950 the first legislative proposals were born to establish the autonomous municipality of Santa Maria la Carità, but it wasn't until 1978 that the comune obtained total autonomy from the municipality of Gragnano through a referendum.

== Monuments ==
=== Religious Buildings ===
- Church of Santa Maria la Carità: although the current building probably dates back to the 17th century, it has been the subject of continuous transformations, among which the most radical was undoubtedly that of 1935, the year also indicated in the inscription located in the prospectus. The façade, with classical lines, is made up of a central body where the order of columns with composite capitals, set on a high base, frames both the architraved portal with tympanum and the large upper window.
- Church of Santa Maria del Carmine: built in 1825 in the fraction of Petraro.
- Church of the Madonna delle Grazie: after a series of unfortunate events, it remains in a state of evident degradation which compromises its static nature. The building shows on the façade still visible sections of pilasters that frame a stone portal, while the single nave interior is punctuated by pilasters and cornices that emerge from the traditional tuff ashlar masonry.

==== Madonna delle Grazie (Botticelli) ====
The Madonna delle Grazie is a painting by Sandro Botticelli believed to have been painted around 1470. The painting was initially gifted by the artist to Pope Sixtus IV and later given to the church of Madonna delle Grazie in Santa Maria la Carità as a favor to the Medici family, which was residing in the area at the time. The painting, after damages to the church due to fires and the 1980 earthquake, fell into the hands of private collectors and was voluntarily handed over to the Italian government in November 2023. The painting's value upon recovery by the government was estimated at €101 million (US $109 million).

=== Archeology ===
Several villas from the Roman era have been found in the Santa Maria la Carità's territory, which date back to the 1st century BC. In some of them the wine cellars, wheat cellars, olive oil cellars and fruit cellars are still visible.

Furthermore, in 1957, in the area of Madonna delle Grazie archaeologists discovered a large necropolis of over 300 tombs containing imported pottery of Corinthian, Etruscan, Chalcidian and Attic origin. The necropolis covers an area of 15,000 m^{2} and was likely used from the 7th to the end of the 3rd century BC. Situated just a few hundred meters from the archaeological site of Stabiae, this area was likely a part of the urban landscape of the city of Stabiae during that period, and was probably damaged during the destruction of Stabiae by Sulla during the Social War. Numerous vases and ornaments have been uncovered in close proximity to the graves.

== Economy ==
Santa Maria la Carità has a diversified economy encompassing agriculture, industry, and increasingly, tourism. Agriculture has historically been the main source of wealth for the inhabitants, particularly with the production of tomatoes, fruits and olives. Floriculture is also very common in the area.

Tourism has recently emerged as a significant driver of economic growth, fueled by the town's strategic geographical position within the coastal region of Campania. With its proximity to renowned archaeological sites such as Pompeii, Herculaneum, and Stabiae, as well as the stunning natural landscapes of the Campanian coast and the nearby Vesuvius National Park, Santa Maria la Carità is attracting visitors from all around the world. The tourism sector has spurred growth in hospitality and dining establishments, creating job opportunities and stimulating local businesses.

== Traditions ==
"Luglio Sammaritano" is a traditional festival held in Santa Maria la Carità during the month of July. This celebration, full of cultural, religious and folkloristic events, represents an important moment for the local community and attracts many visitors to the town. The city is animated by religious processions, traditional music and dance shows, stalls selling local products and children's games.

Among the many activities organized during the festival there is the "Sagra della Melanzana", dedicated to the celebration of the eggplant, a vegetable widely grown in the region and used in many local cuisine recipes. During this event, visitors can enjoy a variety of eggplant dishes prepared by local chefs and participate in food competitions, musical performances and family activities.

The festival culminates with "Palio del Ciuccio", the most awaited event. It is a race featuring five donkeys, with each one symbolizing a distinct district of Santa Maria la Carità, identified by an associated animal: Farfalla (Butterfly - Via Pioppelle), Leone (Lion - Via Polveriera), Delfino (Dolphin - Via Visitazione), Aquila (Eagle - Via Scafati), and Ippocampo (Hippocampus - Via Petraro). This event is highly cherished by the residents of Santa Maria la Carità, evoking a strong sense of belonging and participation within the community. The race takes place along the streets of the city center, around Piazza Borrelli. This tournament aims to revive ancient medieval traditions and celebrate competition among the five districts. In addition to the donkey race, during the previous days, various other activities and games are held, such as tug-of-war, gastronomic competitions, and a historical medieval parade along the main streets of each district.

Furthermore, the municipality regularly organizes concerts, art exhibitions, theater performances and other cultural events, mainly held in Piazza Borrelli in front of the town hall.
