= Sumru =

- Gender: Female

Origin
- Origin: Arabic
- Meaning: The highest part of something; peak; summit
- Region of origin: Middle East

Other names
- Related names: Samru, Sombre, Sommer, Sumroo, Sumr, and Egemen (in Azerbaijani)

Sumru is an Arabic-origin word which refers to the highest part of something; peak or summit.

== Historical use ==
A leading Arab-origin Christian figure in the 18th and 19th century India was named Sumru. Her husband, Walter Reinhard, who was a German adventurer, was also known as Sumru along with other similar names such as Samru, Sombre, Sommer and Sumroo.

== Modern use ==
Sumru is a given name used for females in Turkey. The version of Sumru in Azerbaijani language is the name of Egemen. The word is also used as a family name in Pakistan.

People with the name include:

== Given name ==
- Begum Sumru, Arab-origin noble and Christian figure in India
- Sumru Çörtoğlu (born 1943), Turkish judge
- A. Sumru Özsoy, Turkish academic and linguist
- Sumru Yavrucuk (born 1961), Turkish actress

== Surname ==
- Ali Ahmad Sumru, leader of the Pakistan People's Party in the 1990s

== Variants ==
The word, sumr, in the colloquial Levantine Arabic is the plural form of the color term, asmar, which means "brown". An Egyptian Shafii scholar, Al Suyuti, used the word with the meaning of "black", another color term: Nuzhat al-Umr fī al-Tafdīl Bayna al-Bīd wa al-Sumr (1931; "The Recreation of Life on Preferentialism between the White and the Black in Complexion" in English). However, in Egyptian Arabic, sumr (ﺳـُﻤﺮ) is the plural form of masculine asmar and feminine samra, and refers to dark skin and brunette. In this sense, the word refers to personal attributes and appearance. In a similar vein, the word is the plural form of masculine asmar and feminine samra in Classical Yemeni Arabic which refers to again personal characteristics, but with a different meaning, "yellowish person". Another Arab scholar Al Dimashqī used the word sumra or dark brown to describe the peoples of Arabia.

Sumr was also employed in Old Norse as an adjective which means "any". It is a variant of the Proto-Germanic suma- which is the original form of the current English determiner and adverb some. In the latter function it refers to "to a certain degree or extent" and in the former function "certain unknown or unspecified". This variant, Sumr (سمر in Urdu), is used as a male given name in Urdu. In addition, it was a Jewish feminine given name in the Middle Ages with the meaning of dark brown.

In object-oriented analysis and design, SUMR which is pronounced "summer" is the abbreviation of Simple Use case Markup-Restructured. It refers to a simple plain text markup language which produces documents that are easily converted into XML, HTML and other formats. The same abbreviation also stands for Satellite User Mapping Register.
