= Our Lady of Graces =

Title of the Virgin Mary in Roman Catholicism

- Location: Faenza, Italy
- Date: 1412
- Shrine: Shrines around the world, include, among others: Santa Maria delle Grazie, Italy; Basilica of Our Lady of Graces, India; Diocesan Shrine and Parish of Our Lady of Grace, Philippines.
- Patronage: Diocese of Faenza, as well as cities of Minturno, Cautano, Decimoputzu, Nettuno, Ricadi, Sanluri, Toritto

Our Lady of Graces (Italian: Madonna delle Grazie or Nostra Signora delle Grazie) or Saint Mary of Graces (Italian: Santa Maria delle Grazie) is a devotion to the Virgin Mary in the Roman Catholic Church. Several churches with this dedication often owe their foundation to thankfulness for graces received from the Virgin Mary, and are particularly numerous in Italy, India, Australia, United States, Portugal, France and the Italian-speaking region of Switzerland. Also it is related to the Marian apparitions in which was revealed the Miraculous Medal, also known as the Medal of Our Lady of Graces.

== Patronage ==
Our Lady of Graces is the patroness saint of the diocese of Faenza. According to a legend, in 1412, the Blessed Virgin Mary appeared to a local woman. Mary was holding broken arrows symbolizing protection against God's wrath and promised an end to the plagues. Faenza Cathedral has a chapel dedicated to Our Lady, while residents often place ceramic titles with the image on their homes.

Other Italian towns that have Our Lady of Graces as their patroness saint include:

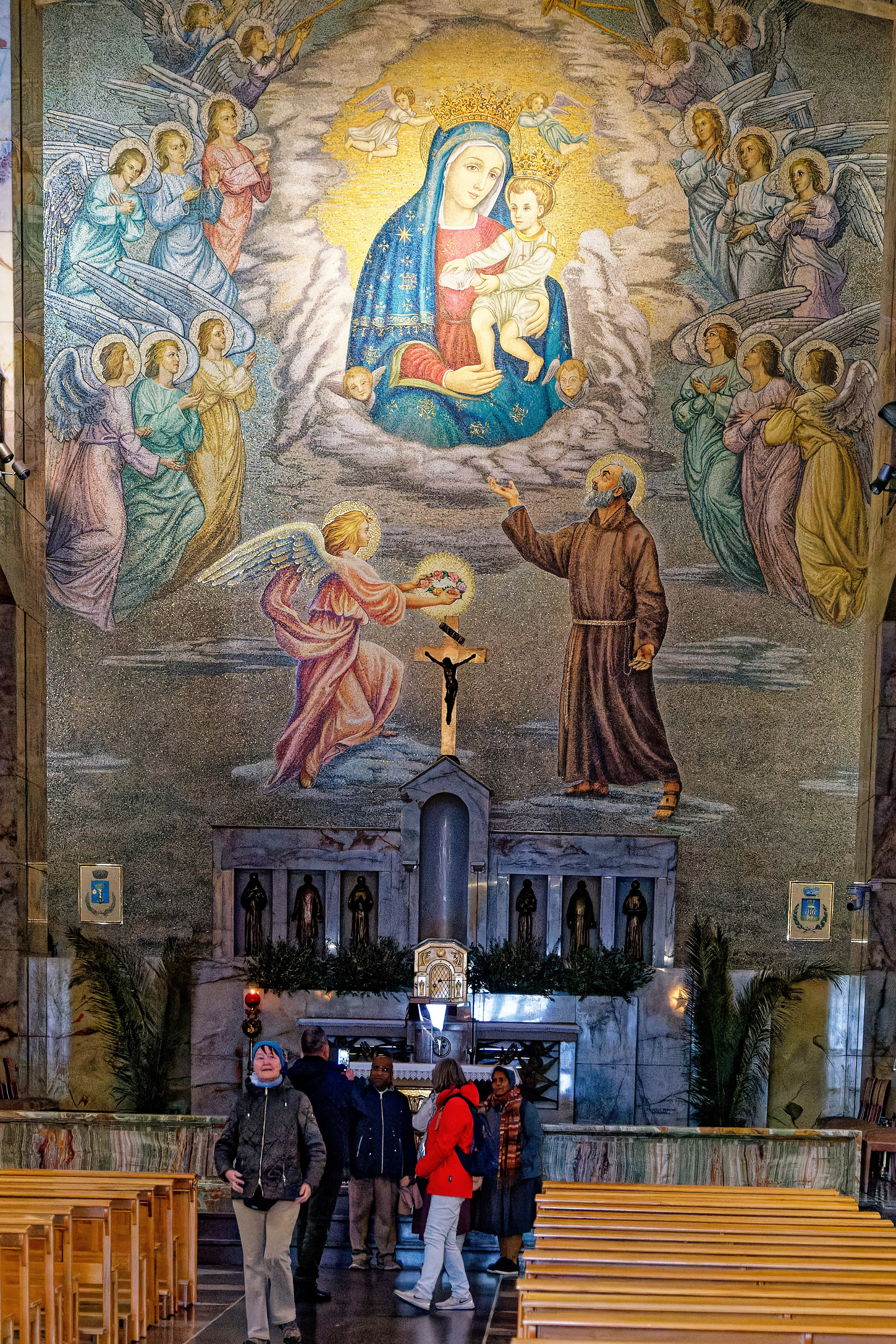
Main altar with Our Lady of Graces (Santa Maria delle Grazie) at the Sanctuary of Saint Pio of Pietrelcina (Padre Pio Shrine) in San Giovanni Rotondo, Italy

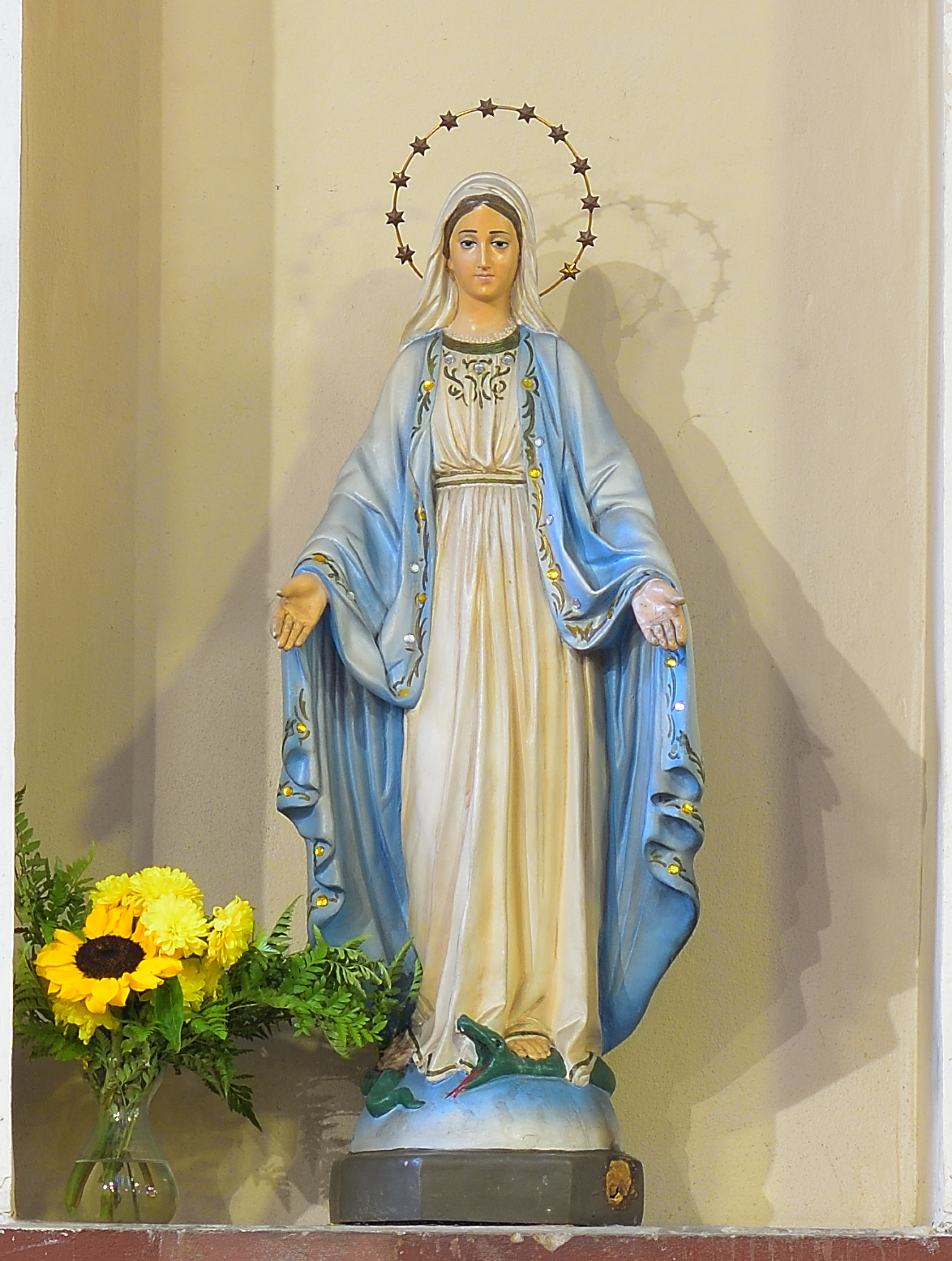
Our Lady of Graces statue as described by St. Catherine Labouré on the Miraculous Medal apparitions occurred in Paris, France

- San Giovanni Rotondo (as co-patroness)
- Minturno
- Cautano
- Decimoputzu
- Ricadi
- Sanluri
- Toritto

=== Cotignac ===
Local tradition holds that in August 1519, Mary appeared to a woodcutter and requested a church be built and dedicated to her as "Our Lady of Graces". The Church of Our Lady of Graces in Cotignac was ransacked during the Revolution, but later restored.

== Churches ==
=== Italy ===
- Acquaviva Platani
- Alanno, Abruzzo : A renaissance church of Santa Maria delle Grazie, built around 1485 to venerate a miraculous apparition of the Madonna.
- Alife
- Anghiari, Tuscany : Chiesa di Santa Maria delle Grazie o della Propositura, built 1628–1740.^{,}
- Anversa degli Abruzzi
- Arezzo, Tuscany : A late Gothic church built close to the site of a well, which had been associated with Paganism, and had been destroyed at the behest of Saint Bernardino of Siena.
- Arzignano, Veneto : Sanctuary built after the plague of 1485.
- Bevagna
- Brescia, Lombardy : Basilica of Madonna delle Grazie
- Capua
- Casale Monferrato
- Castelfranco di Pietralunga
- Castiglion Fiorentino
- Castiglione d'Orcia
- Cerignola
- Città di Castello
- Colle Faggio di Monteleone di Spoleto
- Cortona
- Qualietta, Avellino
- Fabro
- Faenza
- Farnese, Lazio : Clarissan monastery of Santa Maria delle Grazie.
- Floridia
- Foligno
- Giano dell'Umbria, Umbria : Small medieval country church, restructured in neoclassical style.
- Grado
- Gravedona
- Gravina in Puglia
- Imperia
- Lendinara (also called now called San Giuseppe)
- Livorno
- Magione
- Magliano Sabina
- Maiori
- Mantua
- Massa Lubrense
- Melilli
- Milan, Lombardy : Santa Maria delle Grazie, site of the fresco of the Last Supper by Leonardo da Vinci.
- Modugno
- Montalcino
- Montefalco
- Montegabbione
- Montepescali di Grosseto
- Monteleone d'Orvieto
- Monterotondo
- Montevarchi
- Monticelli di Olevano sul Tusciano
- Montone
- Monza
- Naples (at least three churches)
- Oratory of Santa Maria delle Grazie, Parma
- Paternò
- Perugia
- Santa Maria delle Grazie, Pesaro
- Piancastagnaio
- Piazzetta Mondragone
- Pistoia
- Preggio di Umbertide
- Ravello
- Revello (a chapel)
- Rome (at least three)
- Rovereto
- San Giovanni d'Asso
- San Giovanni Rotondo
- San Marzano di San Giuseppe
- Sansepolcro
- San Severo
- Sant'Anatolia di Narco
- Scandriglia
- Scanno
- Scansano
- Senigallia (S. Maria delle Grazie)
- Terracina
- Toritto
- Trevi
- Varallo
- Venice
- Vicovaro
- Vigevano
- Villa Santa Maria
- Zafferana Etnea

=== Poland ===
- Jesuit Church, Warsaw
- Kielce Cathedral

=== India ===
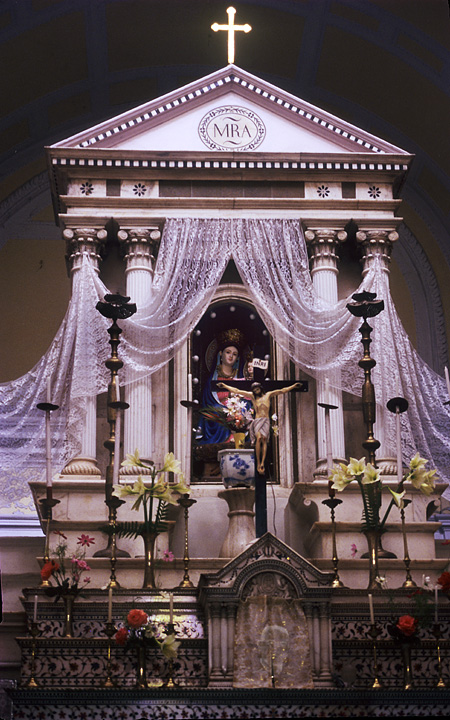
High altar of Basilica of Our Lady of Graces in Sardhana, India

- Delhi
- Basilica of Our Lady of Graces, Sardhana, famous for faith healing

=== Philippines ===
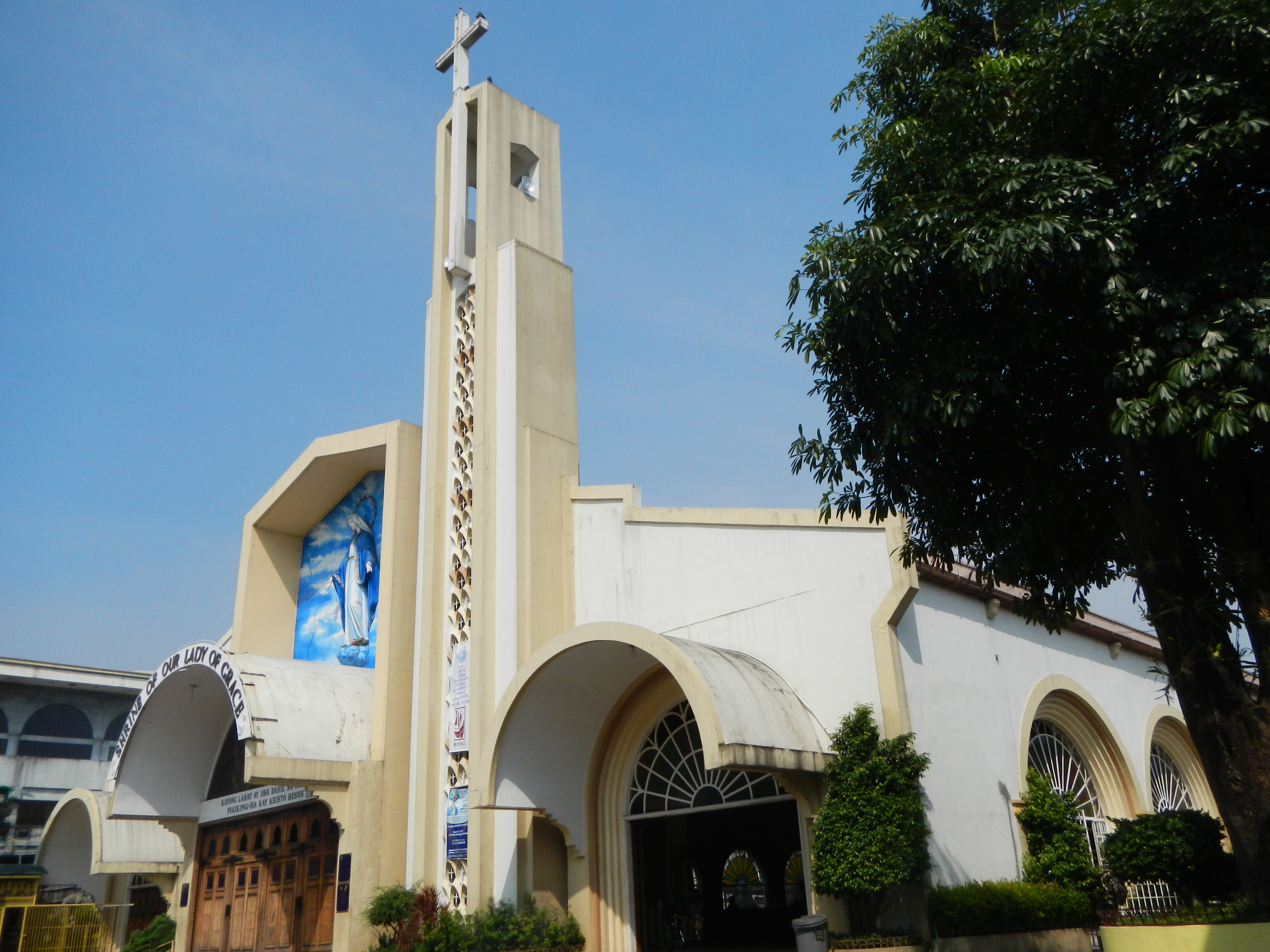
The old facade of the Diocesan Shrine and Parish of Our Lady of Grace of the Diocese of Kalookan.

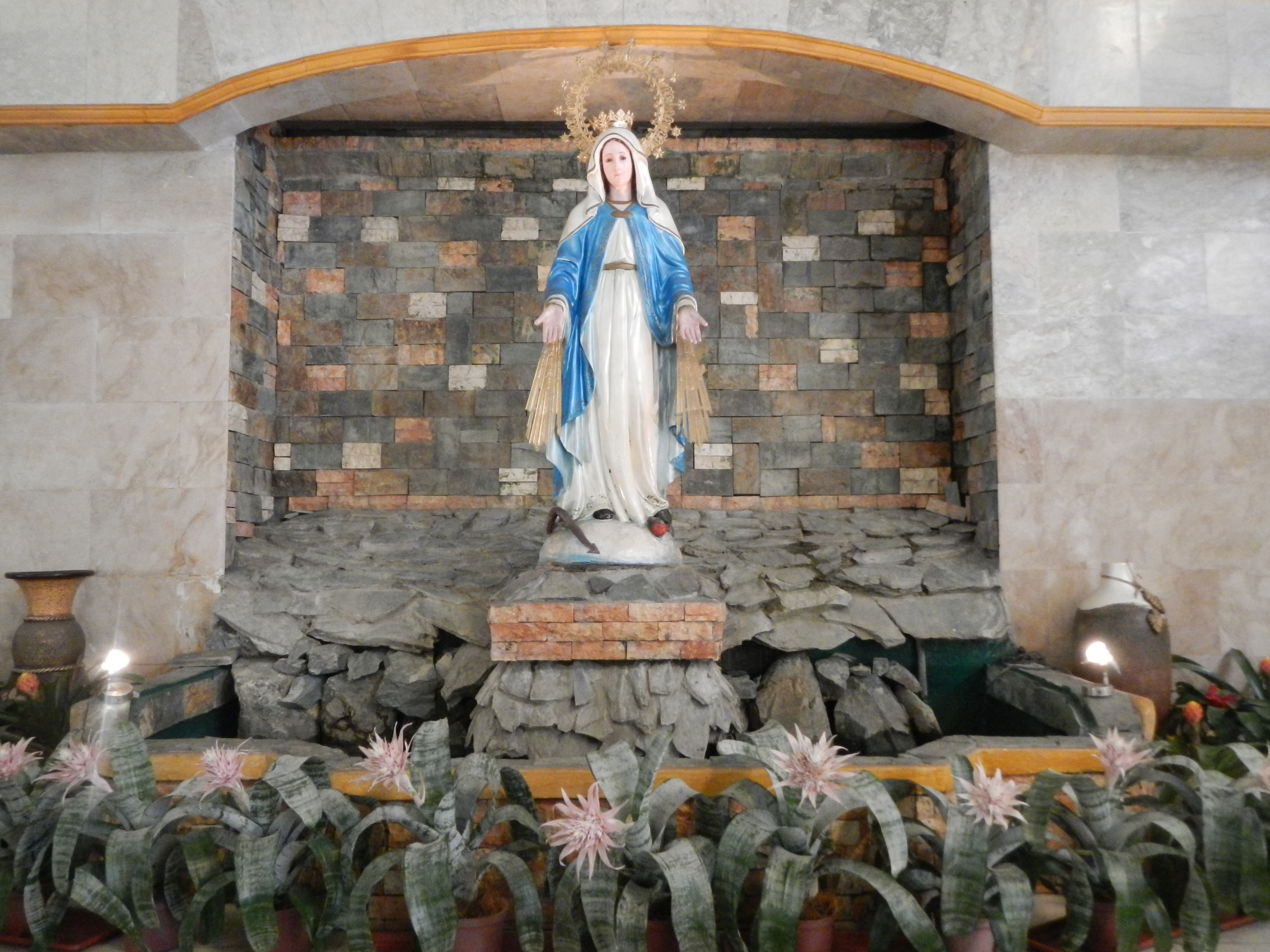
The old statue of Our Lady of Grace inside the church

- The Oblates of Mary Immaculate established Our Lady of Grace Parish on 5 May 1946, making it the oldest among the five parishes under the Vicariate of the Our Lady of Grace of the Diocese of Caloocan. The creation of the parish 72 years ago on a 3, 964 sq. m donated lot on the former 11th Avenue, now known as St. Eugene de Mazenod Avenue marked the beginning of the evangelization of the Missionary Congregation in the heart of Caloocan.

Our Lady of Grace Parish commenced when the Archbishop of Manila, Most Rev. Michael J. O' Doherty, granted the request of the OMI Superior in the Philippines, Rev. Fr. Gerard Mongeau, to establish a house in Grace Park. The Philippine Realty Corporation, administrators of the Grace Park Subdivision, donated the use of eight lots in Block 171 for the church. With the help of the U.S. Signal Corps, a temporary chapel was built.

The first Eucharistic Celebration was done on 16 May 1946 by Rev. Fr. Joseph F. Boyd, OMI, attended by thirty–five people. But as early as mid–1949, just three years after the inauguration of the church, the need for a bigger space was seen. In response to this necessity, the people of Grace Park launched a fund–raising campaign. After two years, a new church was ready to be blessed by the Archbishop of Manila, Rev. Msgr. Gabriel Reyes. The church co-patron is St. Eugene de Mazenod and the feast of Our Lady of Grace is observed every first Sunday of May.

=== Switzerland ===
- Bellinzona, Canton Ticino : A late fifteenth-century church which was attached to a Franciscan convent.

=== Malta ===
- Qrendi
- Żabbar
- Victoria

== Chapels, oratories and other sanctuaries ==
- Catania
- S. Pellegrino di Gualdo
- Ravello, Punta Paradiso
- Teramo
- Torretta
- Pontassieve

== Paintings ==
There are many thousands of paintings by this name throughout Italy. One may be seen at Grosseto Cathedral (by Matteo di Giovanni, 1470), in the church of San Lorenzo at Poggibonsi, and in the cathedral of Perugia. Unlike the Madonna del Soccorso or the Madonna della Misericordia, the Madonna delle Grazie has no particular iconography, although many of these paintings represent just the head or bust of the Virgin.

Others include:

- Madonna delle Grazie (Botticelli)

== Statues ==
There are statues of her by Antonello Gagini at Chiesa dell'Osservanza, Catanzaro and the church of Madrice Vecchia, Castelbuono, and by Vincenzo Gagini at the Church of San Martino, Randazzo. Another statue sculpted from wood by Mariano Gerada could be found in Żabbar a Maltese town dedicated to Our Lady of Graces, Il-Madonna tal-Grazzja, as known by the locals.

== Festivals ==
Festivals to her are again celebrated in many places. In Italy one of the most famous is at Catenanuova. In Stamford, Connecticut she is celebrated by emigrants from Minturno. In the Maltese Islands at Żabbar, People's Sunday is held on the first Sunday of Lent, and in Victoria the feast is celebrated on the first Sunday after 8 September every year and is the last feast of the Summer season.
