= San Giuseppe, Lendinara =

Church building in Lendinara, Italy

San Giuseppe is a small, Renaissance style, Roman Catholic church in the city of Lendinara, in the province of Rovigo, region of Veneto, Italy. It is located near the Cathedral of Lendinara.

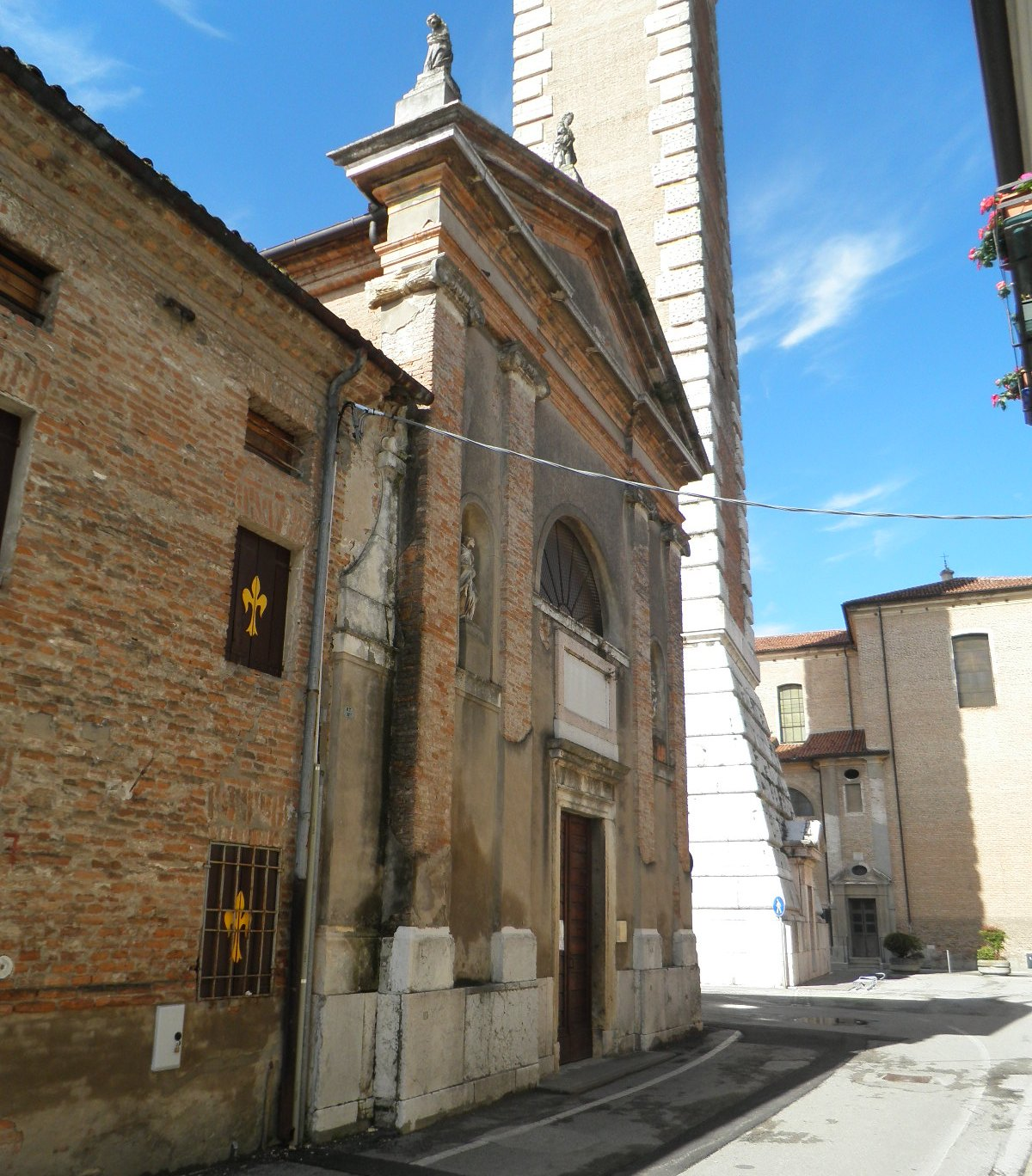
Facade with bell tower behind

== History ==
This church at one time dedicated to the Marian devotion of Santa Maria delle Grazie. It was built around the year 1500 and served as a host for a confraternity of Flagellants. In 1797, the church was suppressed and the building auctioned. It was acquired in 1812, by an aristocrat Francesco Antonio Baccari, who restored the church and redecorated the church. In 1822, the church was rededicated to the Glory of St Joseph, and used as a baptistry for the nearby Cathedral of Santa Sofia.

Many canvases in the church are copies of the Bolognese and Roman schools of the 18th-century, commissioned from artists of the Accademia of San Luca by Francesco Baccari. The main altarpiece is copy of a canvas depicting the Glory of St Joseph (1820) by Andrea Pozzi. He also painted the St Vincent of Paul in the second altar on the left. The quadratura and the murals depicting the Flight to Egypt and Presentation of Jesus at the Temple were painted (1822) by Giovanni Fassini.
