= Faujdars of Purnea =

The Faujdars of Purnea were the rulers and governors of Purnea and the surrounding regions of modern-day Bihar in India. The Faujdars of Purnea were notable in that they had created an autonomous jurisdiction for themselves and did not allow the Nawabs of Bengal and Murshidabad to interfere. They also carried the title of Nawab and so are sometimes referred to as the "Nawabs of Purnea".

== History ==
The first faujdar of Purnea was Saif Khan who was a member of the Muslim nobility and was appointed in between 1704-1707 by the Mughals. During this period, Purnea was in a state of virtual anarchy with regular raids carried out by the zamindars of Morang, the Chakwar tribe of Begusarai and neighbouring zamindars. After his appointment, Saif Khan set to work pacifying and restoring order to the region. He was successful in defeating the enemies of the Mughal Empire and was eventually able to bring peace to the region. He also expanded his territories into modern-day Nepal and was a patron of arts. He eventually passed in 1748 and was succeeded by his son.

Fakhr-ud-in Hussain Khan (also known as Nawab Bahadur), the son of Saif Khan was the next in line as the faujdar of Purnea. He was said to have had no talents or capacity as a governor and was also known for his hoarding of jewellery. He made several attempts to defy the Nawabs of Bengal who opposed his oppressive conduct. After a battle with the Nawabs, he escaped to Delhi and died in obscurity. After this period, the faujdars of Purnea were appointed by the Nawabs of Bengal however they all varied in the amount of loyalty they showed to the Nawabs. One of these faujdars, Shaukat Jang, fought on the side of the Bengal during the Battle of Plassey.

The French mercenary, Walter Reinhardt Sombre was briefly employed by the faujdars of Purnea in the 1760s and commanded an army to fight on their behalf that unusually reported directly to him rather than to the faujdars. This army was said to have consisted of local Bihari soldiers and other European mercenaries.

== Expansion and conflict with Nepal ==
Under the rule of Saif Khan, Purnea engaged in a protracted struggle with neighbouring kings in Nepal. Due to repeated Gorkhali incursions into modern-day Bihar, Saif Khan led a campaign into Nepal (specifically in Morang district) that culminated in the sacking of Makwanpur and nearby towns where various atrocities were committed.

== List of Faujdars/Nawabs of Purnea ==
- Saif Khan (shekh saju arfat alam sarkar)
- Fakhr-ud-in Hussain Khan
- Sayed Ahmed Khan
- Shaukat Jang
- Khadim Husain Khan
