= Martín Sombra =

Colombian guerrilla (1938–2025)

Elí Mejía Mendoza (1938 – May 19, 2025) better known by his alias Martín Sombra was a Colombian guerrilla, and member of the Eastern Bloc of the Revolutionary Armed Forces of Colombia (FARC).

== Biography ==
Mendoza was born in La Dorada. He became part of the FARC-EP in 1966, where he would be close to Manuel Marulanda, and in 1986 he was commissioned to create the Ciro Trujillo Company to enter Casanare. As part of the command of the Eastern Bloc of the FARC-EP, he participated in the attack on the Girasoles military base in 1992. He was also known as the jailer of the FARC-EP, as he was in charge of the custody of the hostages. He held dialogues with the Bolivarian Guerrillas of Venezuela.

In 2008, he was arrested on his way to Saboyá. He took advantage of the Justice and Peace Law, designed by the government of Álvaro Uribe Vélez and in 2010 he was sentenced to 24 years for the Taking of Mitú (Operation Marquetalia). Around 2017, he was released. But he was recaptured on February 1, 2020, for the kidnapping of cattle rancher Samuel Estupiñán in 2017.

On May 19, 2025, he died at the El Tunal Hospital in Bogotá, at the age of 87.
