= Madonna delle Grazie (Botticelli) =

1470 painting by Sandro Botticelli

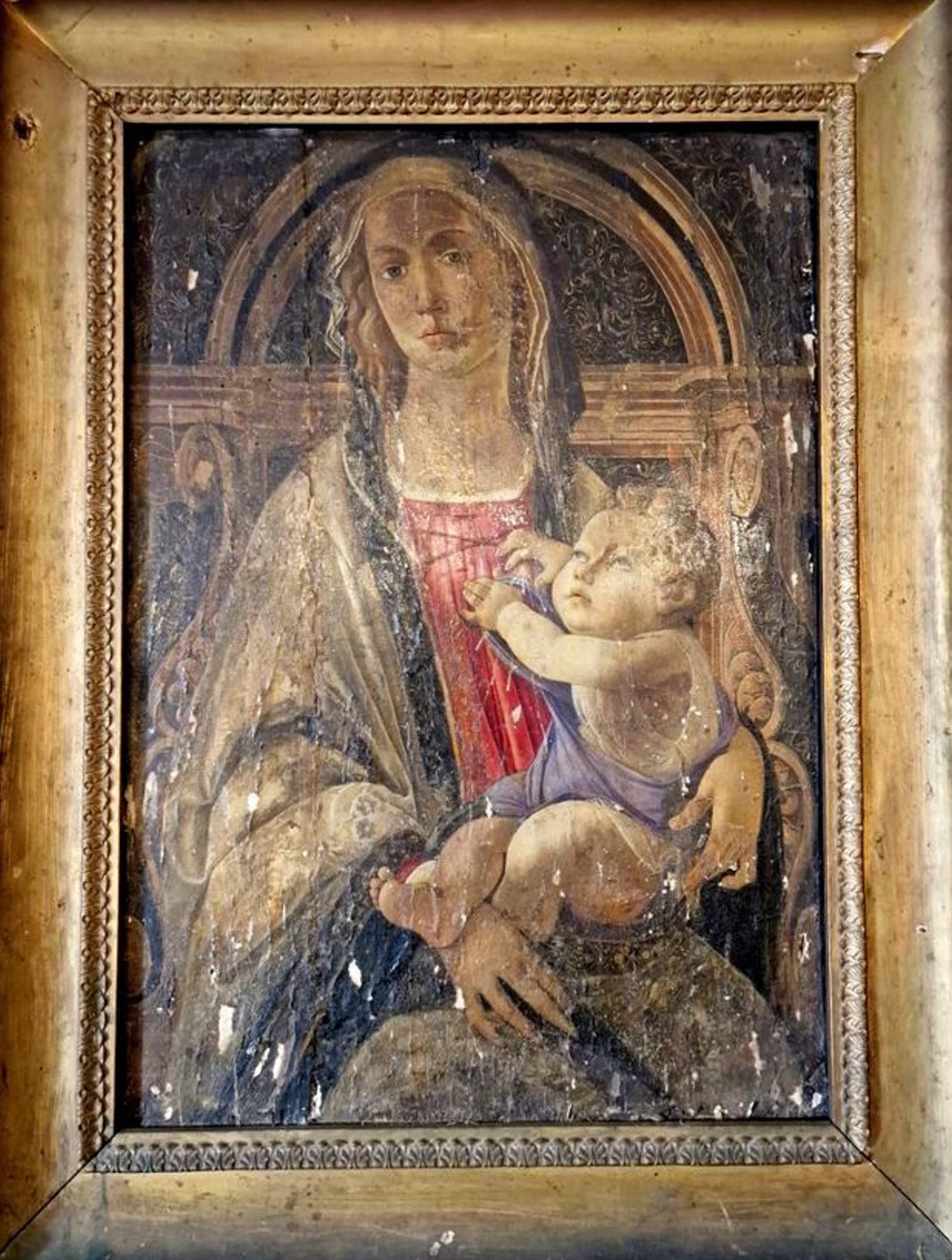
- The painting in 2023 prior to restoration
- Artist: Sandro Botticelli
- Year: c. 1470
- Medium: Tempera on wood
- Dimensions: 58 cm × 80 cm (23 in × 31 in)

The Madonna delle Grazie is a tempera painting on panel by the Italian Renaissance master Sandro Botticelli believed to have been painted around 1470. It was gifted to Pope Sixtus IV and displayed at a church in Santa Maria la Carità as a favor to the Medici family. The painting later fell into the hands of private collectors and was rediscovered by the Italian government in November 2023. The painting's value upon recovery was estimated at US$109 million.

== History ==
The painting was created by Sandro Botticelli around 1470. Art historian Peppe Di Massa argues the work was inspired by and depicts Botticelli's alleged muse, Simonetta Cattaneo Vespucci. Botticelli donated the painting to Pope Sixtus IV who donated it to the Santa Maria della Carità in Santa Maria la Carità to gain favor with the Medici family. In 1931, the government of Italy listed the painting as a culturally significant artifact and it was inspected again after it was moved in 1968. In the 1960s art historian Raffaello Causa attributed the painting to Botticelli. In 1982, the church the painting was located in was damaged in an earthquake and the painting was given to a local family while the church was repaired. In the 1990s, the work was listed as missing by the Italian government.

In November 2023, the painting was voluntarily surrendered to the Carabinieri Art Squad to determine if the family "acquired it properly" after it had gone uninspected for over 50 years. The painting was reportedly in poor condition, leading to concerns the painting may be seized under Italian laws that allow "a painting of such cultural value" to be taken from an owner who cannot properly preserve it.

== Exhibition ==
The painting is planned to be exhibited in one of the national museums in Naples. However, it will require restoration due to some paint loss and scratches that probably appeared during a 1982 earthquake and subsequent house moves. The restoration will take at least a year. The painting's value upon recovery was estimated at US$109 million.
