= Begum Samru =

Ruler of Sardhana (c. 1753–1836)

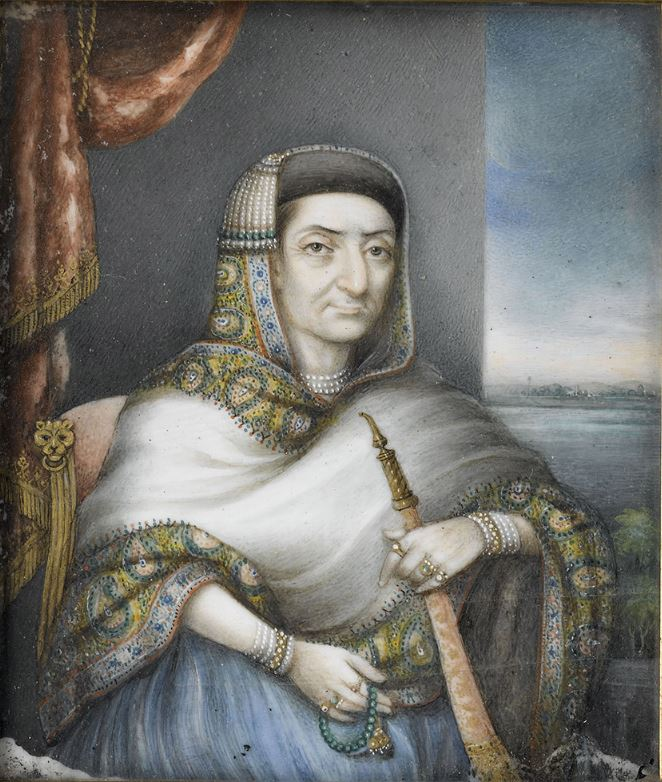
- Portrait of Begum Samru

Ruler of the Principality (Jagir) of Sardhana
- Reign: 1778 − 1836
- Predecessor: Walter Reinhardt Sombre
- Successor: David Ochterlony Dyce Sombre
- Born: Farzana Zeb-un-Nissa c. 1753; Kutana, Meerut, Maratha Confederacy
- Died: 27 January 1836 (aged 82–83); Sardhana, Mughal Empire
- Burial: Basilica of Our Lady of Graces, Sardhana
- Spouse: Walter Reinhardt Sombre
- Occupation: Nautch girl Ruler of Sardhana

Joanna Nobilis Sombre (c. 1753 – 27 January 1836), popularly known as Begum Samru (née Farzana Zeb un-Nissa), a convert Catholic Christian, started her career as a nautch (dancing) girl in 18th-century India, and eventually became the ruler of Sardhana, a small principality (jagir) near Meerut. She was the head of a professionally trained mercenary army, inherited from her European mercenary husband, Walter Reinhardt Sombre. This mercenary army consisted of Europeans and Indians. She is also regarded as the only Catholic ruler in Northern India, as she ruled the principality of Sardhana in 18th- and 19th-century India.

Begum Sumru died immensely rich but without an heir. Her inheritance was assessed at approximately 55.5 million gold marks in 1923 and 18 billion deutsch marks in 1953. Her inheritance continues to be disputed to this day. An organisation named "Reinhards Erbengemeinschaft" still strives to resolve the inheritance issue.

== Life ==
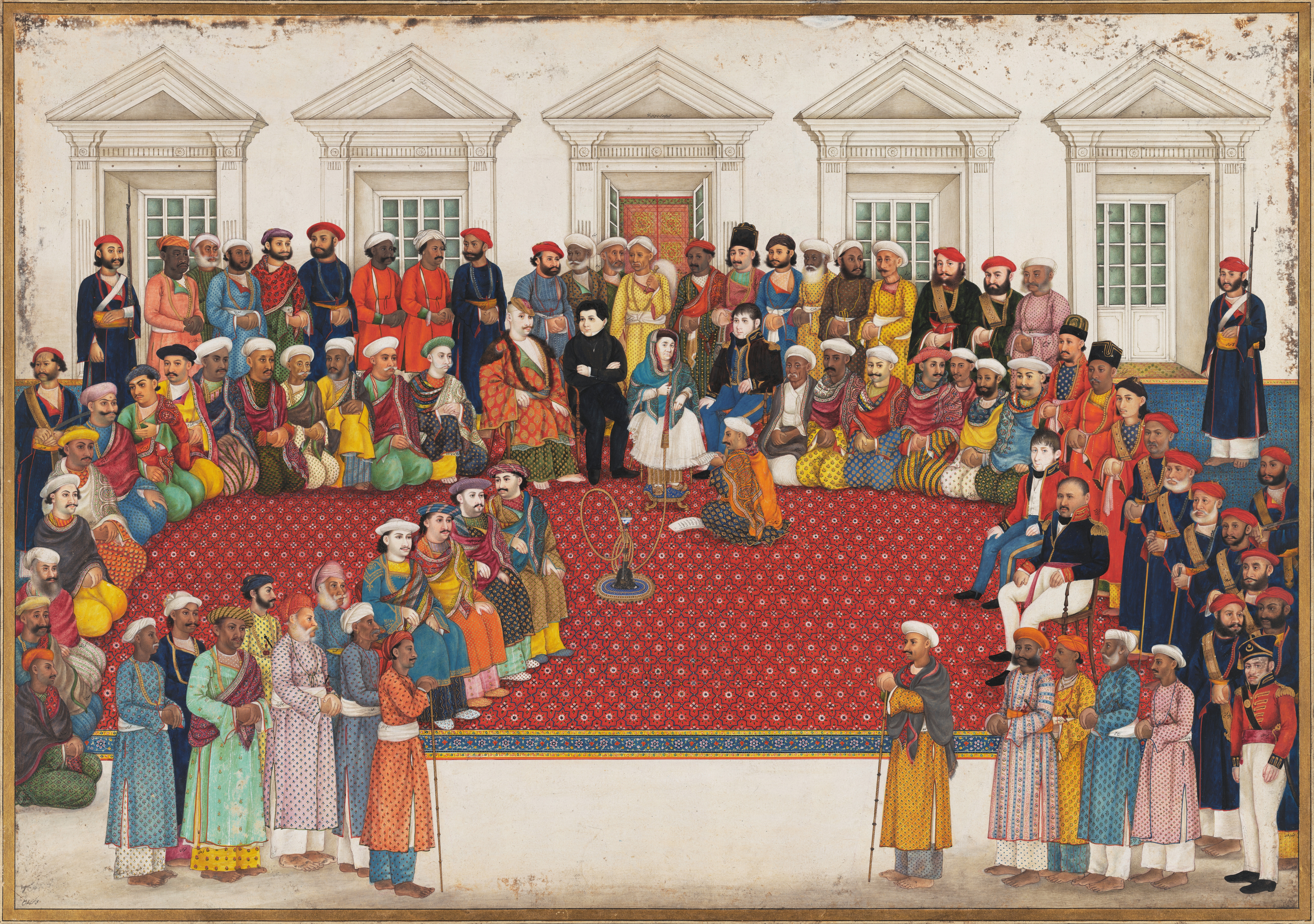
Begum Samru's Household. Chester Beatty Library

Begum Samru was of slight stature (never growing more than 4'8'' tall), fair complexion and distinguished by exceptional leadership abilities of an uncommon order. More than once, she headed her own troops in action. She was reportedly of Kashmiri descent.

When she was in her early teens, she was sent to live as a concubine with a mercenary soldier Walter Reinhardt Sombre of Luxembourg, who was operating in India. Walter Reinhardt Sombre, then 45 years old, came to Chawri Bazar and fell for the charms of Farzana, then a tawaif of 14, says Johan Lall in his "Begum Samru - Faded Portrait in a Gilded Frame".

A soldier of fortune, Sombre moved from Lucknow to Rohilkhand (near Bareilly), then to Agra, Deeg and Bharatpur and back to the Doab. Farzana helped him in those times of intrigue and counter-intrigue.

=== Ruler ===
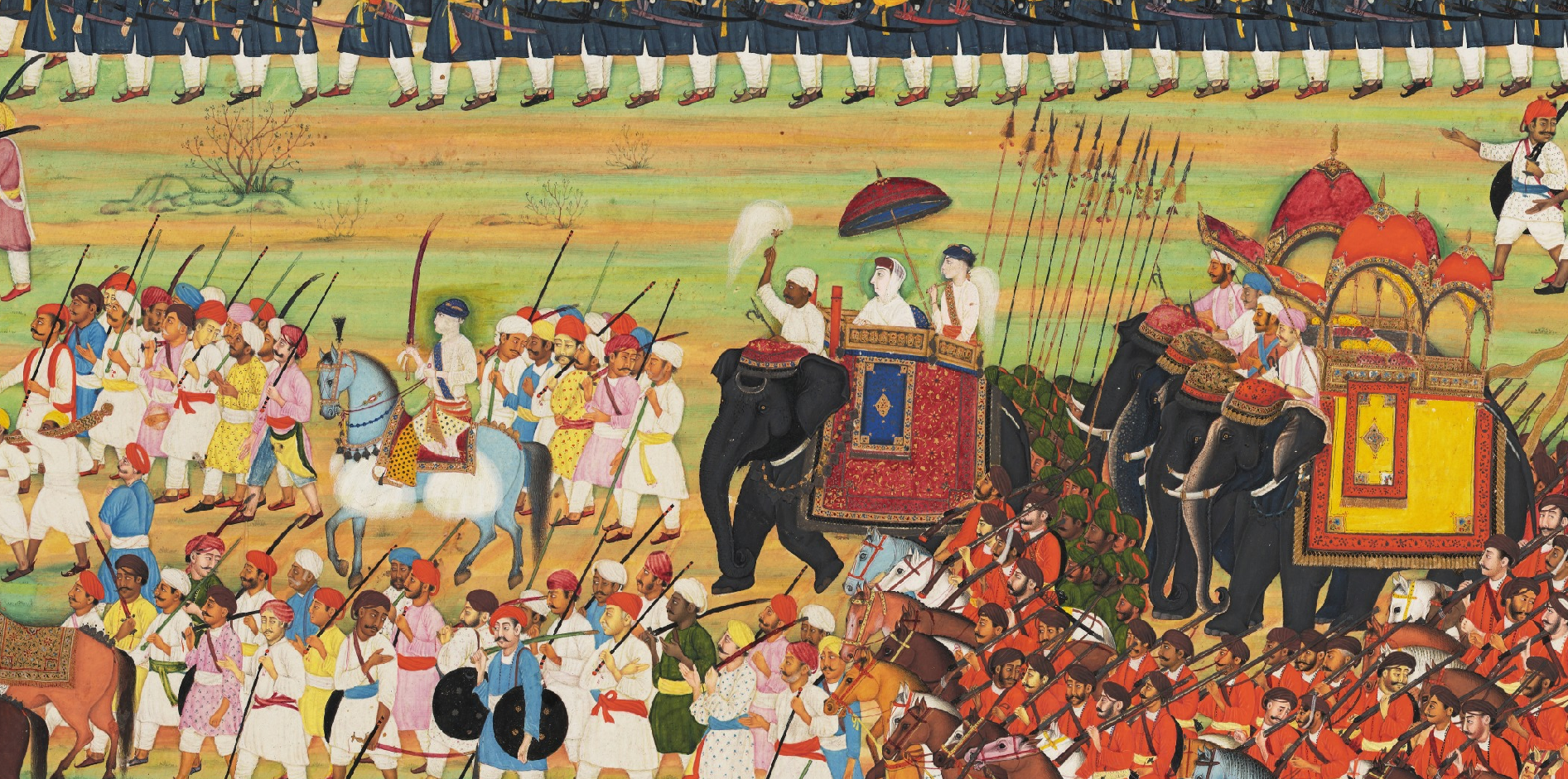
Section of an illustration of Begum Samru and her army, made 1805–26

On the death of Walter Reinhardt in 1778, she succeeded to his principality yielding about £90,000 per annum. Over time, she became powerful, ruling over a large area from Sardhana, Uttar Pradesh. Her conduct in the internal management of her estate was highly commendable. On 7 May 1781, aged around thirty, Begum Samru was baptized Joanna Nobilis, by a Roman Catholic priest. Throughout her life, she had only one friend, Begum Umdaa, belonging to the other Jagirdar family of Sardhana, who became her closest friend and remained so until her death. Even after Begum Umdaa was married, Begum Samru took out time to visit her to Meerut in good and bad. Farzana was courted by some of the European officers who were associated with her husband. Among them were Le Vassoult, a Frenchman, and George Thomas, an Irishman. The Begum favoured the Frenchman and when, in 1793, the rumour spread that she had married him, her troops mutinied. The couple sought to escape secretly by night - Le Vassoult on horseback and the Begum in a palanquin. Misinformed that Le Vassoult had been shot, she stabbed herself but survived. Her lover, however, died of a self-inflicted wound to the head. One version has it that she suggested a suicide pact but only nicked herself when the unsuspecting Le Vassoult shot himself dead. When British General Lord Lake met the Begum in 1802, in a fit of enthusiasm he gave her a hearty kiss, which appalled her troops. But with her customary tact, Begum Samru pacified them by saying that it was only "the kiss of the Padre to a repentant child". The Begum, though only 4 1/2 feet tall, wore a turban and rode on horseback as she led her troops to battle. So invincible did she seem that the superstitious spread the word that she was a witch who could destroy her enemies just by throwing her cloak towards them. Her army occupied the left of the Maratha line at the battle of Assaye and hers was the only part of the Maratha force that was not driven in disarray from the battlefield. Having annihilated an advance by the 74th Highlanders and a picket detachment commanded by a Colonel Orrock, her army then withstood a cavalry charge from the Raj before marching from the field in good order. She inducted Jats into her irregular armies. After the fall of Aligarh in September 1803, she was induced to surrender to Lord Lake and afterwards lived on good terms with the British, receiving visitors including the Bishop of Calcutta, Reginald Heber, Commander-in-Chief of the Indian Army Lord Combermere and Italian adventurer Jean-Baptiste Ventura.

=== Death ===
She died at Sardhana in January 1837 at the age of 85, bequeathing the greater part of her property to David Ochterlony Dyce Sombre, who descended from Walter Reinhardt Sombre, from his first wife. Several stories and novels have been written based on her political and diplomatic astuteness and on crucial battles fought by troops directly commanded by her.

== Palace at Chandni Chowk, Jharsa and Sardhana ==
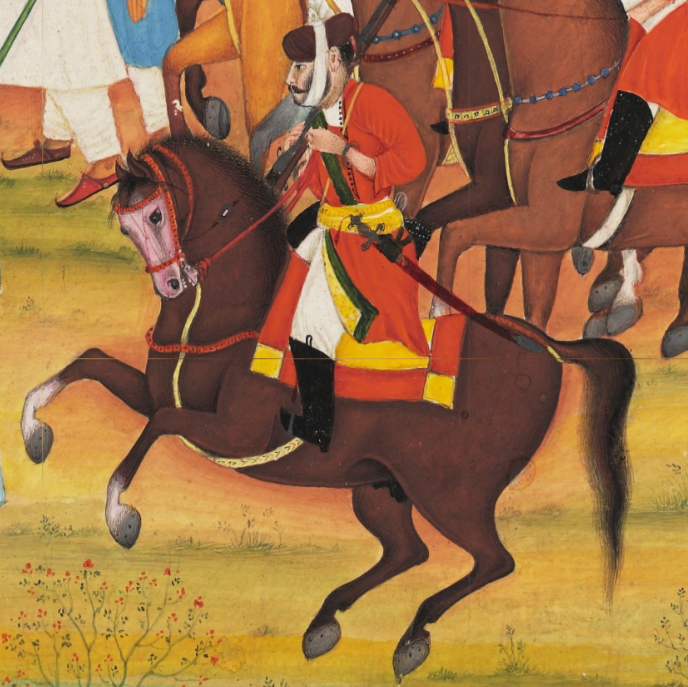
Sowar of Begum Samru

She built palaces at Sardhana, Chandni Chowk in Delhi and Jharsa. The paragana of Badshahpur-Jharsa in Gurugaon in Haryana was also ruled by Begum Samru.

=== Jharsa palace and cantonment in Gurugram ===
Begum Samru Place at Gurugram lies between Badshahpur-Jharsa in Gurgaon. The pargana of Badshahpur-Jharsa was ruled by Begum Samru. She built a palace for herself between Badshahpur and Jharsa. Jharsa was the place of Samru's principal cantonment. Parts of her fort compound have been completely lost to encroachments. Palace building is located between Gurgaon and Jharsa village, which is used as the official residence cum camp office of the district collector of Gurugram district. The Jharsa palace is built in Islamic style. A 1882 land revenue settlement report records that the idol of Sitla Mata was brought to Gurugram 400 years earlier (15th century). Begum Samru claimed the offering to Sitla Mata temple of Gurugram during the Chaitra month and the revenue from the offerings given to the deity for rest of the month was distributed among the prominent Jat families of the area. In 1818, Bharawas district was disbanded and Gurugram was made a new district. In 1821, the Bharaswas cantonment was also moved to Hidayatpur in Gurugram.

=== Sardhana palace ===
The palace built by her in Sardhana near Meerut was the centre of much activity during the reign of Mughal Emperor, Akbar Shah. Shah Alam II, the predecessor and father of Akbar Shah, regarded Begum Samru as his daughter. He did so because the Begum had saved Delhi from an invasion by a force of 30,000 Sikhs, under Baghel Singh in 1783. They had encamped at Tis Hazari (the name of the place being derived from the number of those who constituted the force, estimated at 30,000). Thanks to the Begum's parleys, the Sikhs did not enter the city and went back to Punjab after getting a generous monetary gift from Shah Alam.

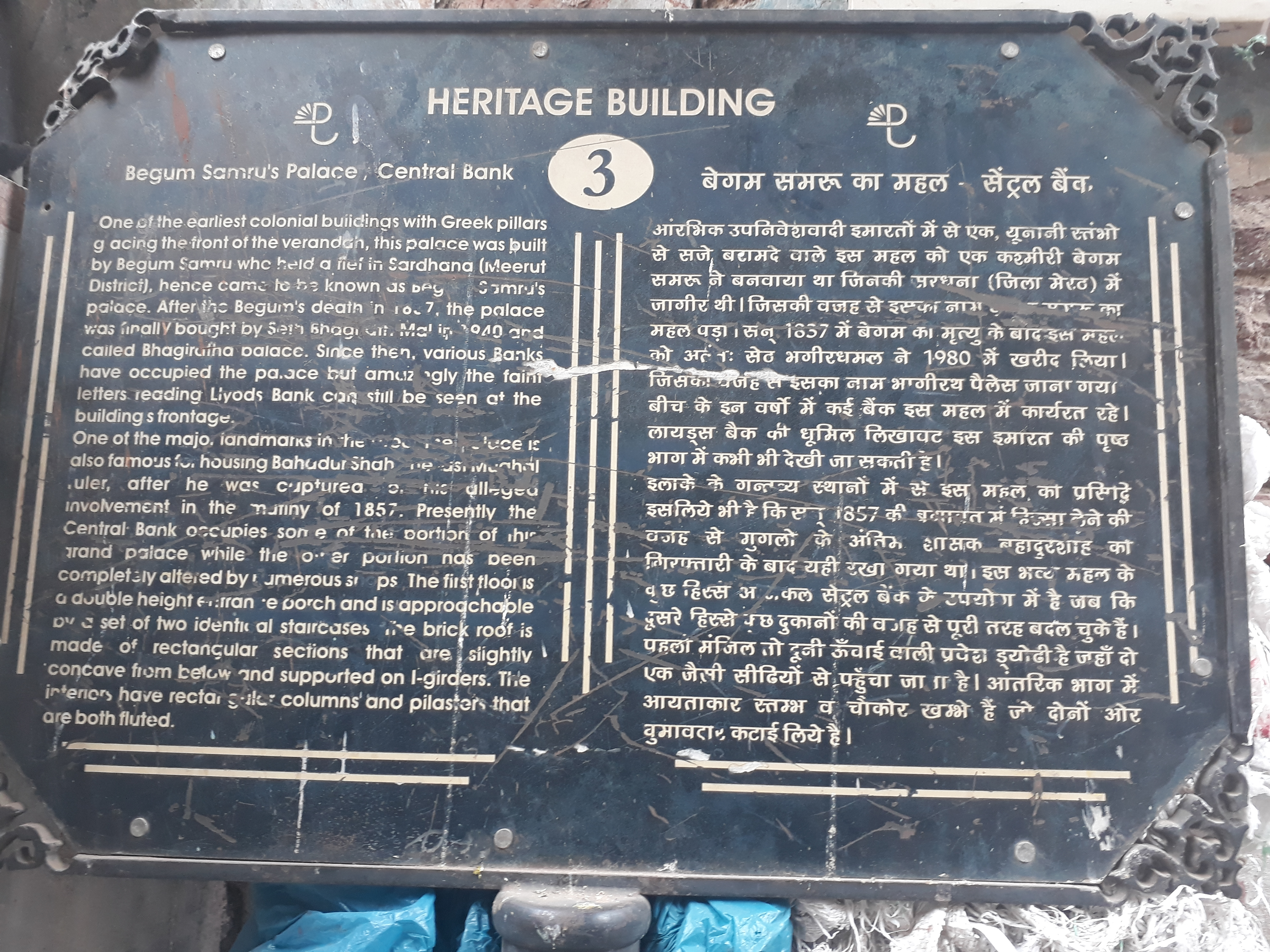
Heritage board at Begum Samru's Palace in Chandni Chawak

In 1787(?), when the emperor, Shah Alam II, blind and feeble, was in pursuit of Najaf Quli Khan and trying to quell the rebellion stirred up by him, an incident occurred at Gokalgarh that brought the Begum closer to Shah Alam. Seeing that the emperor's troops were wavering in their resolve to attack the rebel leader, she advanced with a force of 100 men and whatever big guns she had and opened fire on Najaf Quli Khan and his men. This did the trick and Najaf sought the Begum's help to make his peace with Shah Alam. Thankful for her intervention, the emperor bestowed special honours on her at the royal court and declared her to be "his most beloved daughter". Not only that, she was also confirmed in her estate at Sardhana, which was the subject of a dispute with Louis Balthazar alias Nawab Zafaryab Khan, another son of her late husband, General Sombre, by his first wife, Badi Bibi (senior wife).Until his death, Emperor Shah Alam and his major wives treated her almost as a relative, and embraced her when she entered the zenana (women) quarters. as the English visitor Ann Deane noted in late December 1808: " ....and afterwards I accompanied her to the royal residence ......we then ascended ....to the zenanah ['women's quarters'].... the begum now led the way through crowds of eunuchs ....Here we were met by the queen Dowager....an ugly, shriveled old woman, whom the begum embraced."

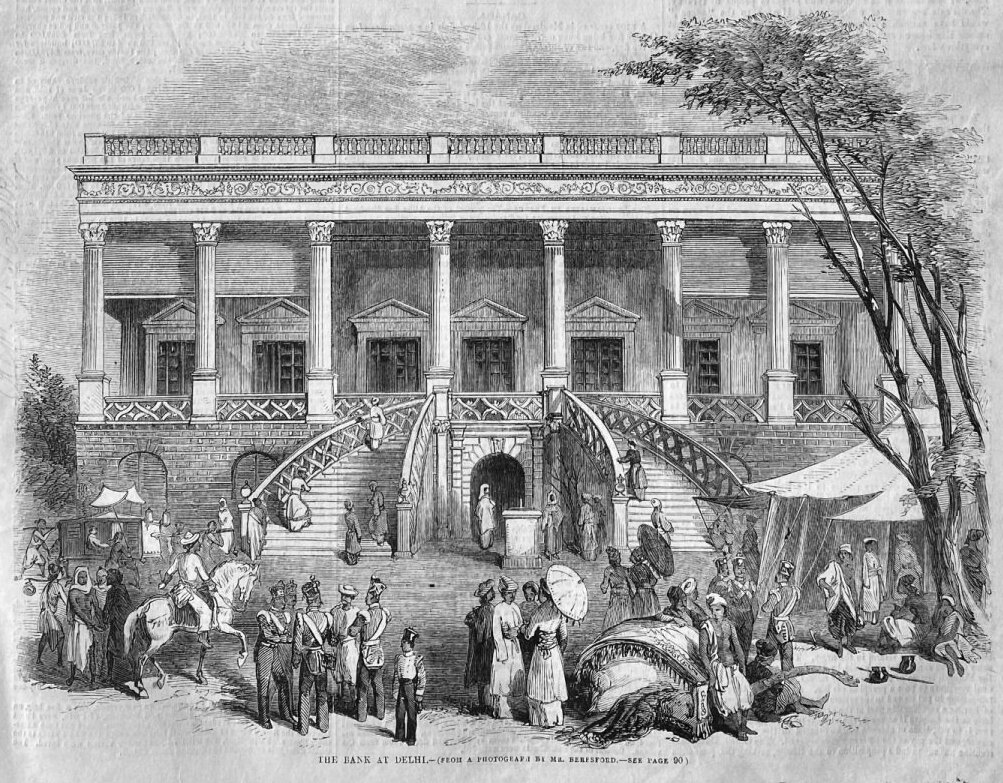
Chandani Chowk palace. Illustrated Times 1857

=== Chandani Chowk palace ===
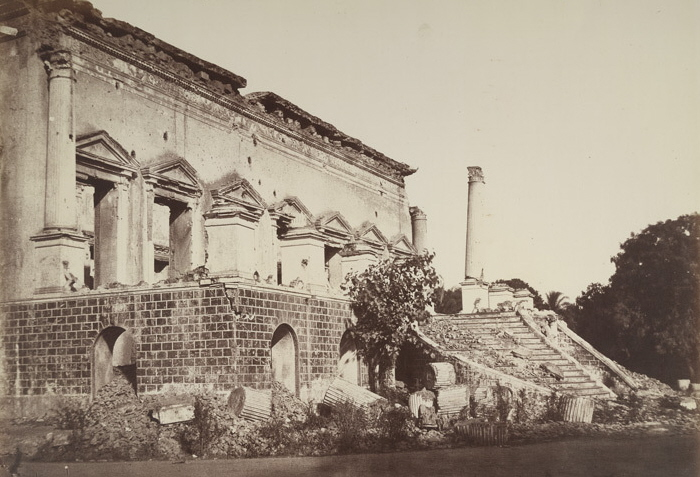
Samru's Palace at Chandni Chowk, Delhi, 1857, after Ghadar, Indian Rebellion of 1857

Begum Samru's palace in Chandni Chowk, now called Bhagirath Palace, was built in a garden gifted by Akbar Shah, a later day mughal, to the Begum when he ascended the throne after the death of Shah Alam II in 1806. Her palatial building still stands in Chandni Chowk, Old Delhi. It is currently owned by the Central Bank of India, Chandni Chowk Branch.

== Death ==
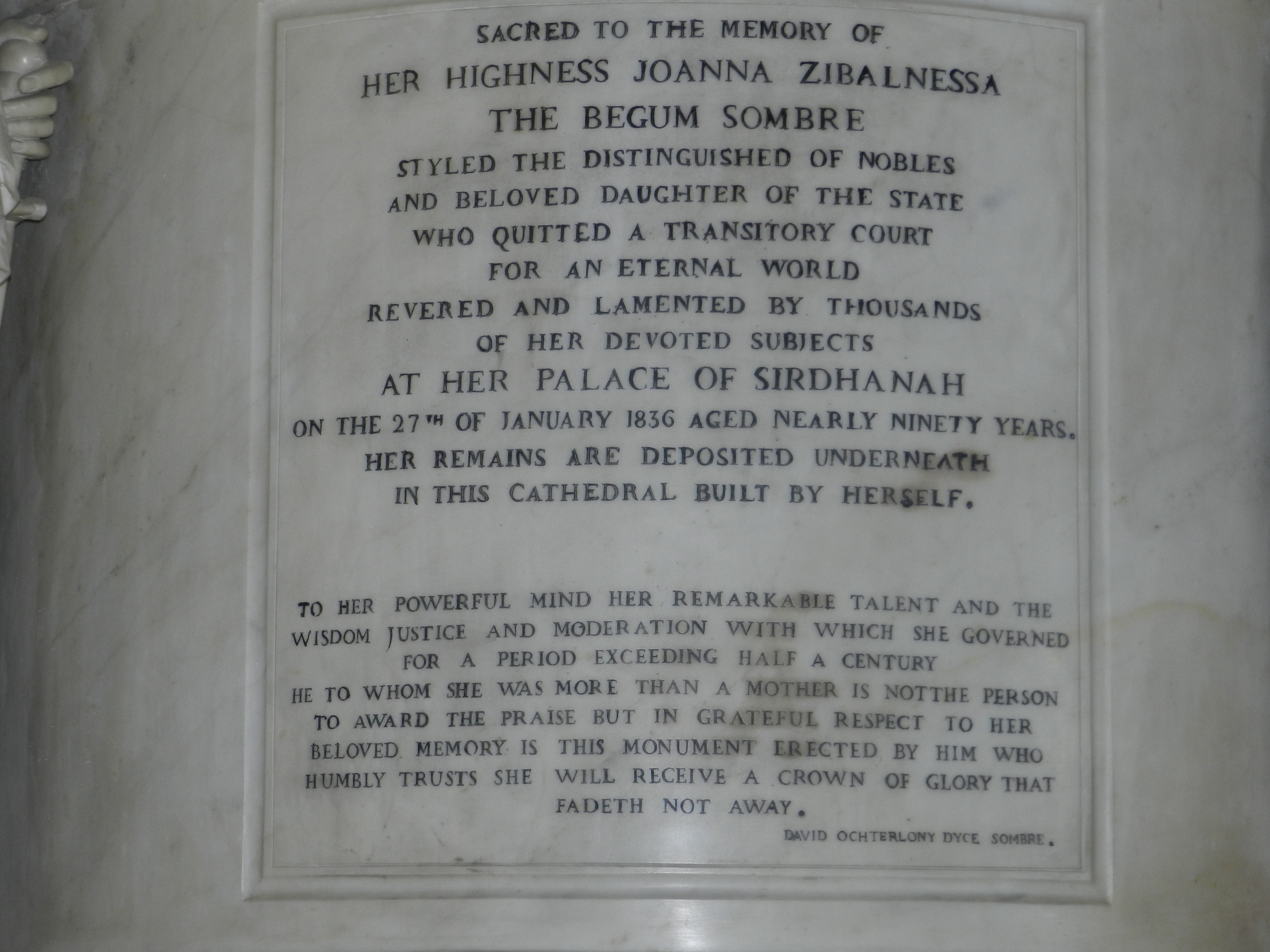
Inscription on the Statue of Begum Samru at the Basilica of Our Lady Of Graces in Sardhana

Begum Samru died on 27 January 1836 at the age of 82 or 83 and was buried under the Basilica of Our Lady of Graces which she had built.

== Popular culture ==
The Begum Samru is depicted as a prominent noble lady in TV drama series Beecham House first aired June 2019. The role was portrayed by Indian actress Lara Dutta. She also features as a prominent character in the novel Flashman and the Cobra by Robert Brightwell.

Begum Samru appears as the antagonist in the British colonial author William Browne Hockley's short story "The Natch". Sir Walter Scott's Old Mother Montreville in The Surgeon's Daughter is based on Begum Samru.

== See also ==
- Nautch
- Tawaif
- Mujra
