= Sardhana =

- city
- Location in Uttar Pradesh, India
- Coordinates: 29.145°N 77.610°E
- Country: India
- State: Uttar Pradesh
- District: Meerut

Government
  - MLA: Atul Pradhan Gujjar
- Elevation: 226 m (741 ft)

Population (2011)
  - Total: 58,490

Languages
  - Official: Hindi
- Time zone: UTC+05:30 (IST)

Sardhana is a city and a municipal board in Meerut district in the Indian state of Uttar Pradesh. It is 85 km (53 mi) northeast of New Delhi and 13 mi from Meerut. It is 5 km from Meerut Karnal National Highway and 12 km from National Highway 58. It is famous for its cloth and timber industries, and its church.

== History ==
According to the Hindu epic Mahabarata, Sardhana, being close to Hastinapur, the capital of the Kauravas, is also known for the ancient Mahadev Temple that is believed to date from the Mahabharata period. It was here that the Pandavas prayed before leaving for the Lakshagrah, the notorious palace made of lac by Duryodhana, at the confluence of the Hindon and Krishna rivers (Kali River, Kali Nadi). This palace was located at Varnavrat, the present Barnava, where the prince resided with their mother Kunti.

In the 19th century, Sardhana was the capital of the Begum Samru, born as Farzana Zebunisa in 1751, and considered to be the only Catholic ruler in India. She married in her early teens, a mercenary soldier Walter Reinhardt Sombre of Luxembourg, who was operating in India. Samru is but a mispronunciation of his surname Sombre. On his death in 1778 she succeeded to the command of his mercenary troops, and subsequently converted to Catholicism in 1781, under the name Johanna.

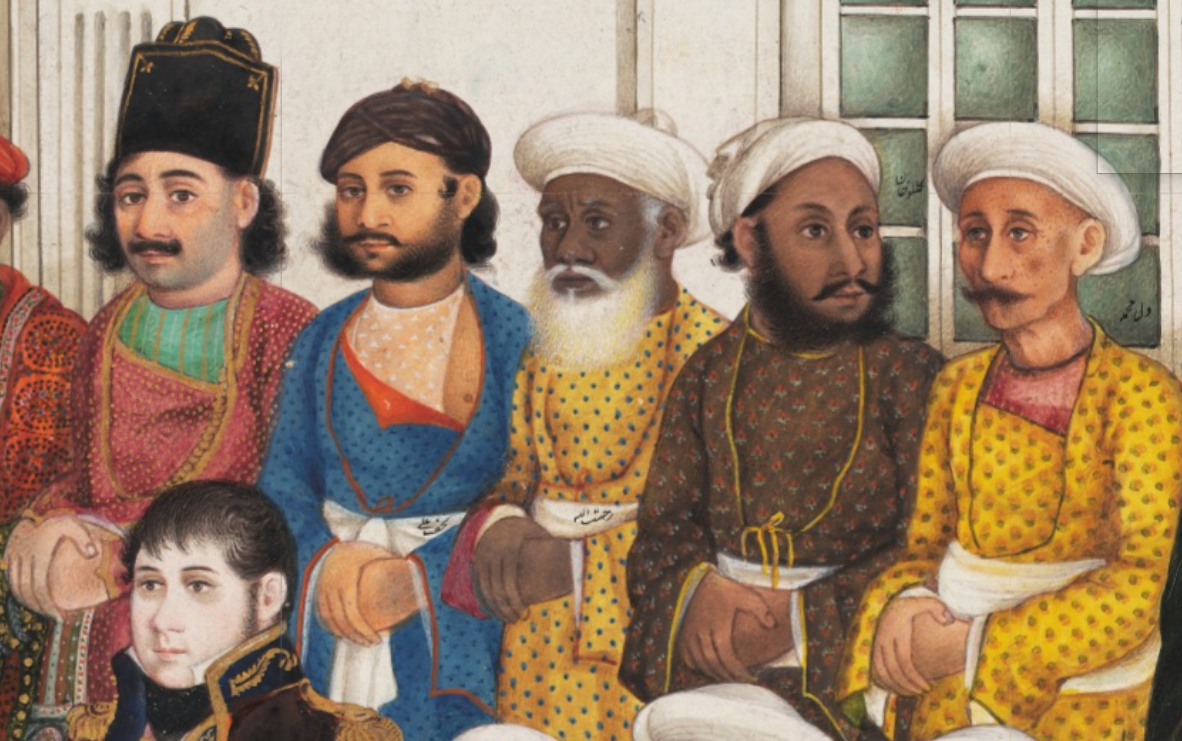
Muslim attendants of the Court of Samru

During her lifetime she supported financially many charitable and religious institutions. She also obtained from the Holy See, the promotion of Father Giulio Cesare, one of the members of the Agra Mission, to the episcopal dignity, and later Pope Gregory XVI wrote to her, and sent her tokens of his paternal approbation. The church she built in 1822, became a cathedral for a short time, with its own bishop. The Bishop's Palace has become a girls school. Her original palace has now become a seminary for training priests. The New Palace has become the boys school. In December 1961, Pope John XXIII conferred the dignity of Minor Basilica to the church, now known as Basilica of Our Lady of Graces. This dignity is given only on churches that are both beautiful and historically famous.

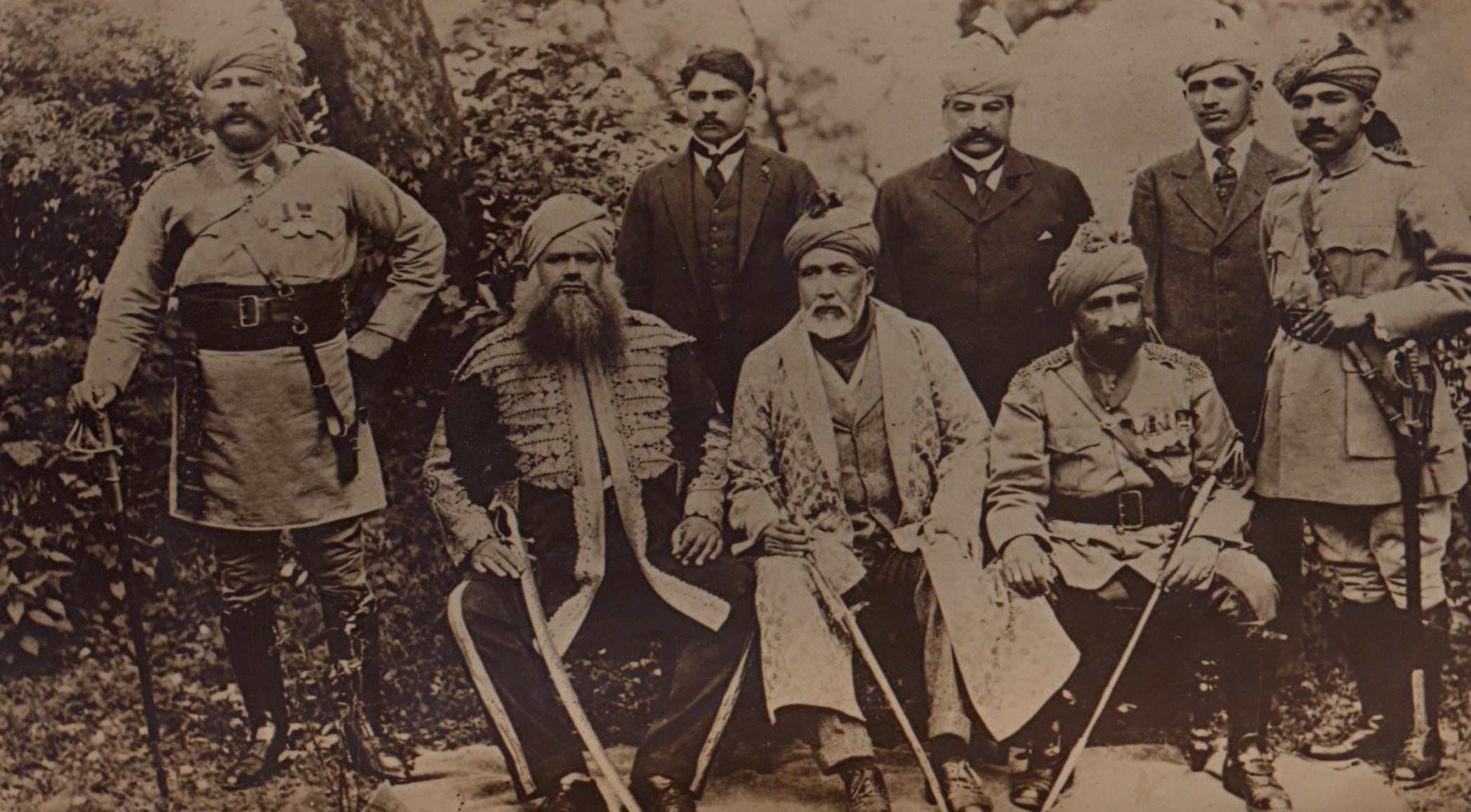
Amjad Ali Shah and his advisers

It was also ruled by the Nawab of Sardhana, Syed Amjad Ali Shah, a grandson of Nawab Jan Fishan Khan, chief of the Paghman tribe, who came to India in 1842 after Begum Samru died. Amjad Ali Shah's son, Sirdar Ikbal Ali Shah, was born there. Sirdar Ikbal Ali Shah was the father of the Sufi teacher and writer Idries Shah.

In 1901, it was the headquarters of a Tehsil, by the same name, in Meerut district, United Provinces of Agra and Oudh, and had a population of 12,467.

== Demographics ==
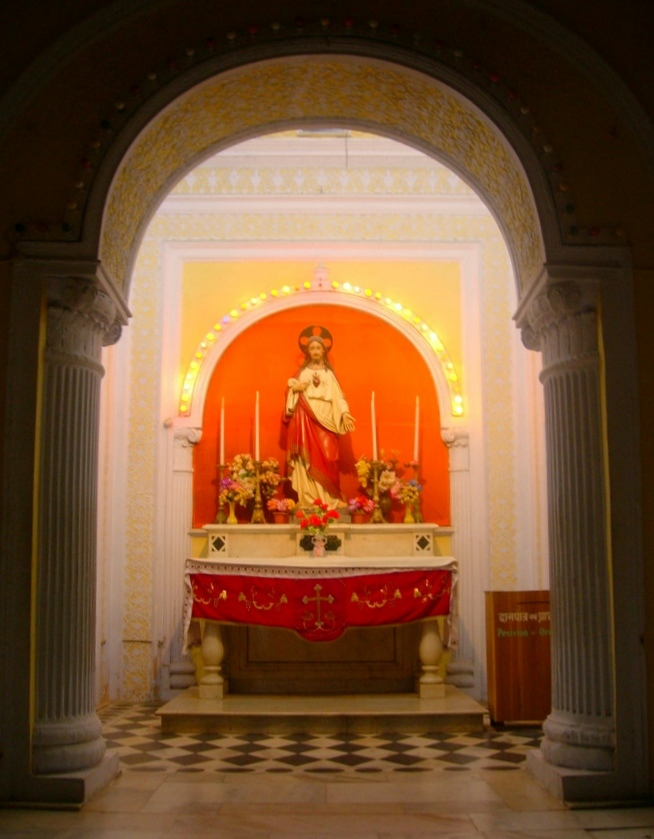
Interior of the 'Basilica of Our Lady of Graces', Sardhana.

As of 2001 India census, Sardhana had a population of 47,970. Males constitute 52% of the population and females 48%. Sardhana has an average literacy rate of 48%, lower than the national average of 59.5%: male literacy is 55%, and female literacy is 40%. In Sardhana, 18% of the population is under 6 years of age.

The main communities in sardhana are Brahmins, Rajput, Jains and Muslims.

== Mahapanchayat ==
There is called a mahapanchayat (great council) of 40 villages on 29 September 2013 to protest against the Uttar Pradesh government charging the local BJP MLA Sangeet Singh Som under the stringent National Security Act at Khera. The crowd becomes violent when the police began to brandish sticks. The situation turned tense when a rumour spread that a youth injured in police action had died. Crowd set fire police jeeps and other vehicles.
