= Walter Reinhardt Sombre =

European adventurer (1725–1778)

- Born: Walter Reinhardt; 27 January 1723; Leipzig, Electorate of Saxony
- Died: 4 May 1778 (aged 55); Agra, Maratha Confederacy
- Burial place: Roman Catholic cemetery, Agra, India
- Occupations: Mercenary, Governor of Agra, General of Bharatpur
- Spouse: Begum Samru

Walter Reinhardt Sombre (born Walter Reinhardt or Reinert; c. 1725 – 4 May 1778) was a European adventurer and mercenary in India from the 1760s.

== Early life ==
Sombre is thought to have been born in Strasbourg or Treves. His birthplace and nationality, being given in various sources as Austrian, French, German, Luxemburger, or Swiss, are uncertain. Another version is that he was born in a village called Simmern near Trier (Treves).

Only one location has documentary support as Walter Reinhard's birthplace in a Protestant church register: Eisenberg in Rhineland-Palatinate, Germany. The register indicates he was born there on 27 January 1723. He grew up among the Sinti Family Pfisterer who spoke a language similar to Hindi until he was 14 and went to France.

== Career ==
He entered early into the French Service assuming the name of Summer, but due to the darkness of his complexion, he received the French nickname Sombre. His nickname was a nom de guerre and is more commonly used for him in Indian sources.

Sombre worked for the Faujdars of Purnea in Bihar soon after his arrival in India. The Faujdar hired him to recruit and train a battalion of infantry troops in the European style. Soon after he moved to Bengal.

He was a turncoat, changing sides as per his advantage. Soon after his enlistment in the French Service, he went to Bengal, entered a Swiss Corps in Calcutta which he deserted in 15 days, fled to the Upper Provinces and served some time as a private trooper in the cavalry of Safdar Jung. This post he also quit and became attached to the service of Mir Qasim, Nawab of Bengal. While in the Nawab's service he was blamed for a massacre of English captives at Patna.

In The Fall of the Mogul Empire of Hindustan, H. G. Keene describes this massacre:

In the meanwhile the unscrupulous heroes who were founding the British Government of India had thought proper to quarrel with their new instrument Mir Kasim, whom they had so lately raised to the Masnad [throne] of Bengal. This change in their councils had been caused by an insubordinate letter addressed to the Court of Directors by Clive's party, which had led to their dismissal from employ. The opposition then raised to power consisted of all the more corrupt members of the service; and the immediate cause of their rupture with Mir Kasim was about the monopoly they desired to have of the local trade for their own private advantage. They were represented at that Nawab's Court by Mr. Ellis, the most violent of their body; and the consequence of his proceedings was, in no long time, seen in the murder of the Resident and all his followers, in October, 1763. The scene of this atrocity (which remained without a parallel for nearly a century) was at Patna, which was then threatened and soon after stormed by the British; and the actual instrument was a Franco-German, Walter Reinhardt by name, of whom, as we are to hear much more hereafter, it is as well here to take note. This European executioner of Asiatic barbarity is generally believed to have been a native of Treves, in the Duchy of Luxemburg, who came to India as a sailor in the French Navy. From this service he is said to have deserted to the British, and joined the first European battalion raised in Bengal. Thence deserting he once more entered the French service; was sent with a party who vainly attempted to relieve Chandannagar, and was one of the small party who followed Law when that officer took command of those, who refused to share in the surrender of the place to the British. After the capture of his ill-starred chief, Reinhardt (whom we shall in future designate by his Indian sobriquet of "Sumroo," or Sombre) took service under Gregory, or Gurjin Khan, Mir Kasim's Armenian General. Broome, however, adopts a somewhat different version. According to this usually careful and accurate historian, Reinhardt was a Salzburg man who originally came to India in the British service, and deserted to the French at Madras, whence he was sent by Lally to strengthen the garrison of the Bengal settlement. The details are not very material: Sumroo had certainly learned war both in English and French schools. He again deserted from the Newab, served successively the Principal Chiefs of the time, and died in 1776.

== Personal life ==
Later on, Walter Reinhardt formed his own mercenary army. Around 1767 when he was 42 he met and married (or started living with) a 14-year-old Tawaif named Farzana, who became known as Begum Samru. Sumroo moved from Lucknow to Rohilkhand (near Bareilly), then to Agra, Deeg, Bharatpur and back to the Doab. At one point of time he was the Governor of Agra. He attained a position from Shah Alam II, briefly held before his death, ruling Sardhana. He was the General of Maharaja Jawahar Singh of Bharatpur.

== Death ==
Reinhardt died on 4 May 1778 in Agra. His burial place in the Roman Catholic cemetery in Agra is still preserved today. The grave bears the Portuguese inscription: "Aqui jaz o Walter Reinhard morreo aos 4 de Mayo no anno de 1778". His widow took over his mercenary army and succeeded to the rule of Sardhana.

== In popular culture ==
A modern novelist, Vikram Chandra, has used the character of Sumroo in his book "Red Earth and Pouring Rain". In this book, fiction intermingles with history and myth. The dramatis personae include the historical adventurers, the Frenchman Benoit de Boigne (1751–1830), the German Walter Reinhardt (1720–1778) and the Irishman George Thomas (1756–1802).

== See also ==
- George Thomas (soldier)
- James Skinner (East India Company officer)
- Frederick Wilson (Raja)

== Bibliography ==
- Noti, Severin (1906). Das Fürstentum Sardhana (in German). Freiburg im Breisgau: Herdersche Verlangsbuchhandlung. pp. 1–61. hdl:2027/mdp.39015070407724. OCLC 77839567.
- Blunt, Edward Arthur Henry (1911). List of Inscriptions on Christian Tombs and Tablets of Historical Interest in the United Provinces of Agra and Oudh. Allahabad. pp. 43–45. OCLC 262825157.
