= Tawaif =

Historical female courtesans in India

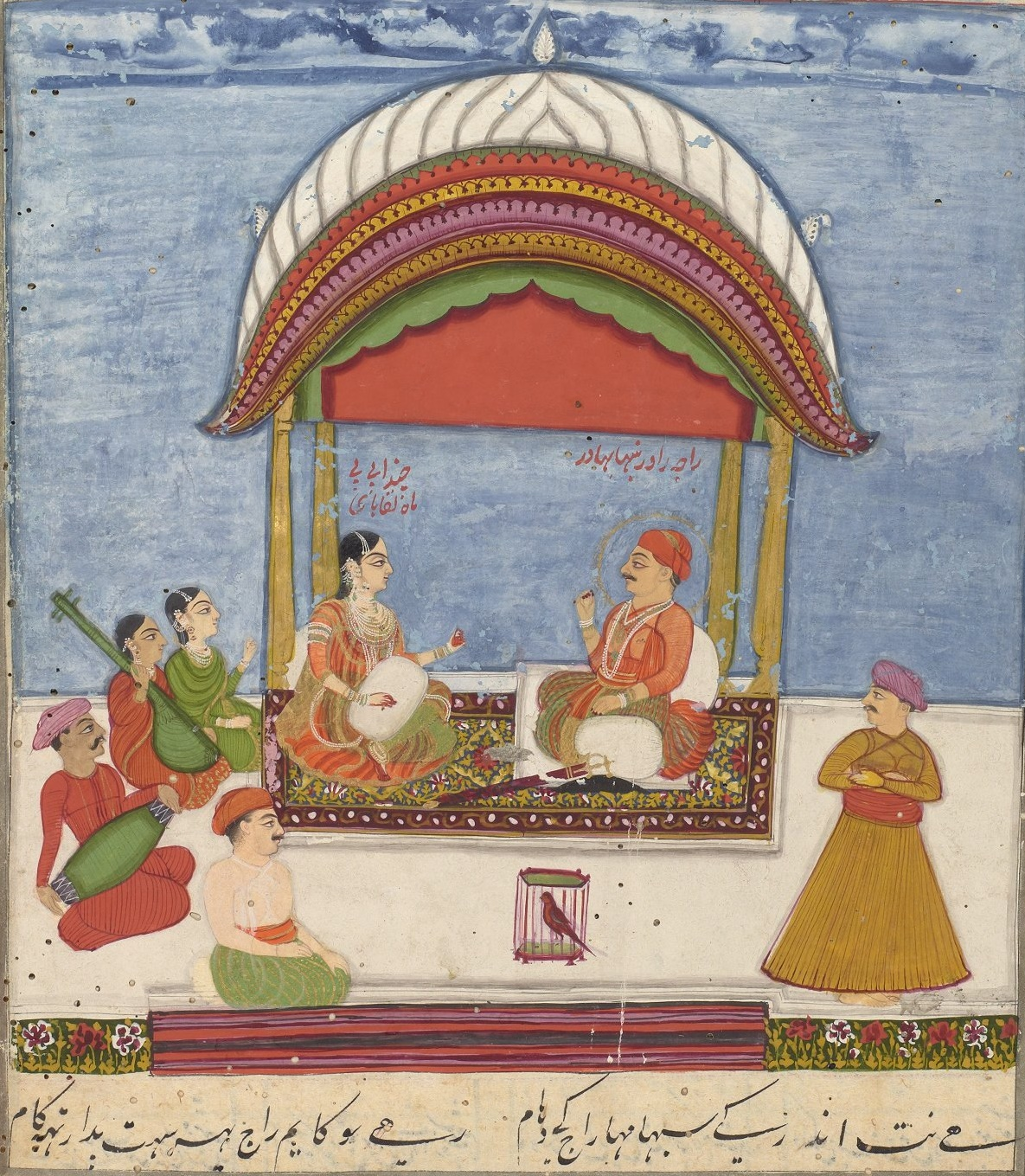
Tawaif Mah Laqa Bai singing poetry

A tawaif (Urdu: طوائف) was a highly successful courtesan singer‚ dancer‚ and poet who catered to the nobility of the Indian subcontinent, particularly during the Mughal era. With fewer opportunities available during the British Raj, many tawaifs transitioned into prostitution.

Known variously as tawaifs in North India, baijis in Bengal and naikins in Goa, these professional singers and dancers were dubbed as "nautch girls" during the British rule. Tawaifs were largely a North Indian institution central to Mughal court culture from the 16th century onwards and became even more prominent with the weakening of Mughal rule in the mid-18th century. They contributed significantly to the continuation of traditional dance and music forms. The tawaifs excelled in and contributed to music, dance (mujra), theatre, and the Urdu literary tradition, and were considered an authority on etiquette.

Indian writer and scholar Pran Nevile said: “The word ‘tawaif’ deserves respect, not disdain. A lot of them were singers and not sex workers. People think of them as prostitutes, undermining their value as great musicians.” On 12 May 2024, Pakistan's Dawn newspaper described tawaif as "cultural idols and female intellectuals."

== History ==
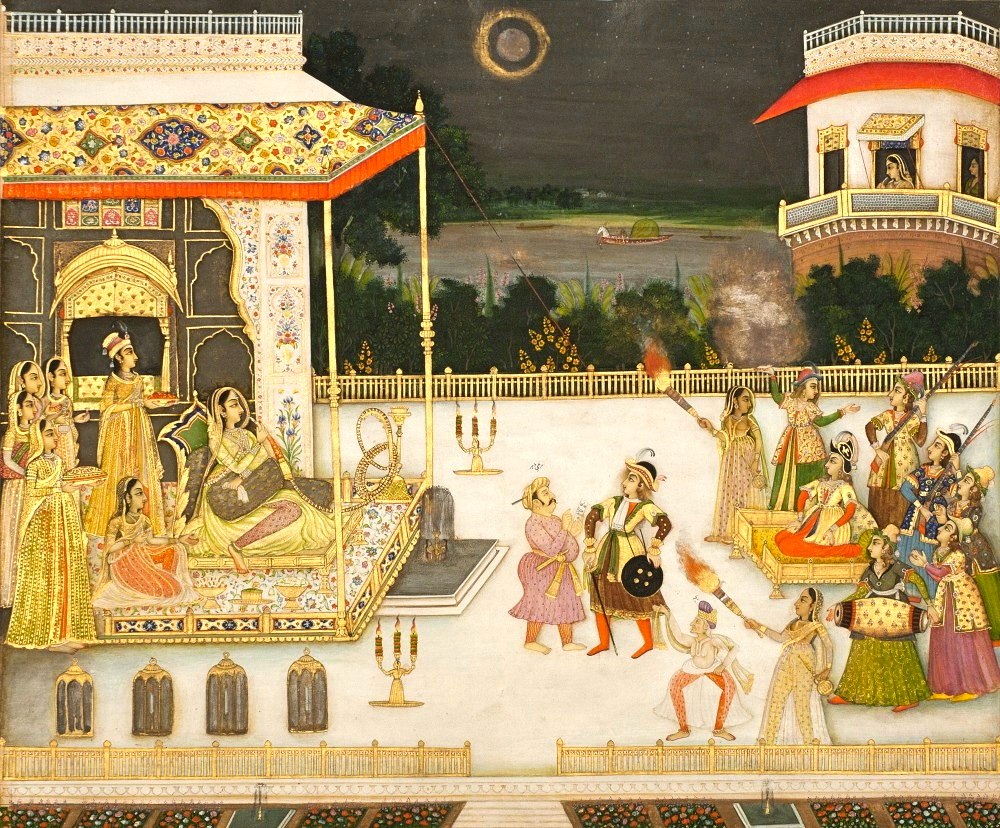
Miniature painting showing Qudsiya Begum being entertained with fireworks and dance (1742 CE by Mir Miran)

Tawaifs have existed for centuries in the Indian subcontinent, with one of the earliest references to the profession being the character Vasantasena from the 5th century Sanskrit drama Mṛcchakatika. In early India, Gaṇikā referred to a courtesan or public dancing girl. Ganikas were trained in fine arts like dance and music to entertain kings, princes, and other wealthy patrons on religious and social occasions. Women competed to win the title of a Nagarvadhu. The most beautiful woman, and most talented in various dance forms, was chosen as the Nagarvadhu. For example, Amrapali is a famous Nagarvadhu or royal dancer.

It is believed in folkloric history that Urvashi was said to have been born on earth as a devadasi and imparted the divine knowledge of dance unto humans. The first dance of the devadasi took place in a temple in the presence of a king who honoured her with titles and gifts, and she was well-versed in temple rituals and took part in temple festivals. Devadasis were well received across North India and modern-day Pakistan and Chinese pilgrim Huein Tsang who visited India in the 7th century testified to a large number of dancing girls in the Sun Temple of Multan. Al-Biruni in his famous study of India in the 11th century recorded that about 500 dancing girls were active in the Somnath temple.

The patronage of the Mughal court in the Doab region and the subsequent atmosphere of 16th century Awadh made arts-related careers a viable prospect. Mughal Emperor Akbar himself was enchanted by a Portuguese expert dancing girl whom he named Dilruba (heart warmer). In 1623, Italian traveler Pietro Della Valle noted that the majority of public courtesans in the Empire were Mohammedan women, who partook in various acts, including singing and dancing, as opposed to the indigenous women of India, who often refused to partake, deeming it immodest.

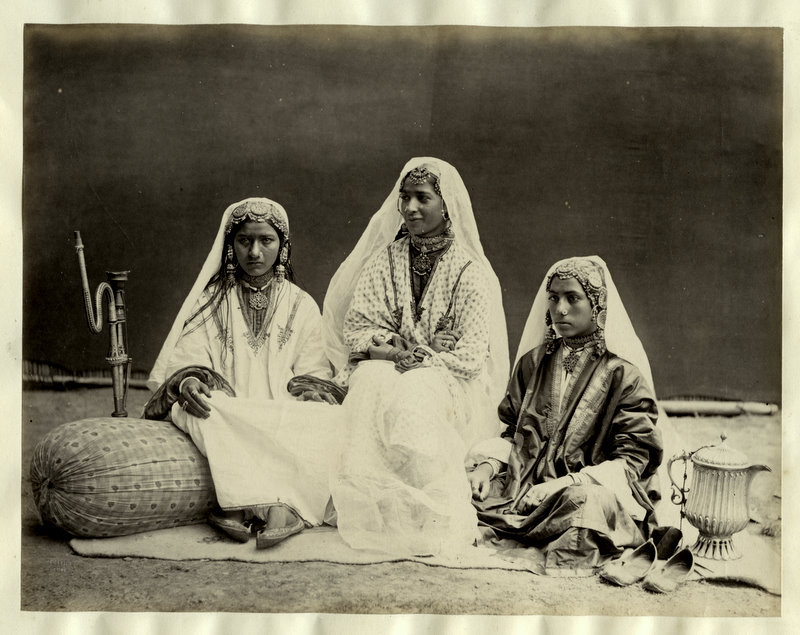
Nautch girls in Kashmir, an albumen print by Frith, c. 1870s

Many girls were taken at a young age and trained in both performing arts, including mujra, Kathak, and Hindustani classical music, as well as literature, poetry (particularly ghazal), thumri, and dadra. The training of young tawaifs also encompassed Urdu writing and enunciation, as well as social skills employed in cultivating patrons and retaining them, particularly the complex etiquette associated with their craft, in which they were seen as experts. During the Mughal period, prostitutes were known as randi, kasbi, and thakahi, some prostitutes also sang and danced, but many of them did not even have access to artistic training.

Once a trainee had matured and possessed a sufficient command over dancing and singing, she became a tawaif, a high-class courtesan who served the rich and noble. Unsurprisingly then, their training in music and dance started at a very young age, under the guidance and tutelage of renowned ustaads (masters). Young girls regularly spent hours in riyaz, a term connoting abstinence, devotion, discipline, and hard labour, learning songs and dance to the exacting standards set by their teachers. At a mundane level, regular riyaz is necessary for a flawless performance before an audience. Many well-known tawaifs practiced and learned music throughout their careers, seeking masters from different gharanas "music traditions" to add to their performance style.

The tawaif's introduction into her profession was marked by a celebration, the so-called missī ceremony, that customarily included the inaugural blackening of her teeth.

It is also believed that young nawabs-to-be were sent to these tawaifs to learn tameez (تمیز "etiquette, good behavior") and Ganga-Jamuni tehzeeb, which included the ability to recognise and appreciate good music and literature, perhaps even practice it, especially the art of ghazal writing. They also became teachers for the sons of wealthy and elite families, who would often send their sons to kothas so they could learn proper Hindustani language, poetry and etiquette from tawaifs. The boys would be told to sit and observe how a tawaif goes about her interactions. The tawaif's contribution to society came from a tradition of families and enjoyed a hierarchy. The uppermost echelon of tawaifs was entrusted with the responsibility of teaching adab (etiquette) and qa'ida (manners) to the kings and young princes. They would also familiarize the royalty with the finer nuances of poetry, music, dance and literature. By the 18th century, they had become the central element of polite, refined culture in North India.

The kotha of a tawaif is a performance space and as a guardian of arts and culture, and is only open to the city's elite and wealthy patrons. In these rarified spaces, tawaifs would compose poetry, sing and dance with live musical composition, as well as performing at banquets, all of which required years of rigorous training. Tawaif is a performer who thrives on sponsorship from royal and aristocratic families, and the dancers are responsible for performing mujra dance with good manners. True mujra is elegant, complex, and artistic, presented elegantly. The tawaif is also invited to perform at grand occasions such as a marriage or the birth of a male heiren. In such occasions, they usually perform a mythological or legendary story, like singing. The tawaifs would dance, sing (especially ghazals), recite poetry (shairi) and entertain their suitors at mehfils.

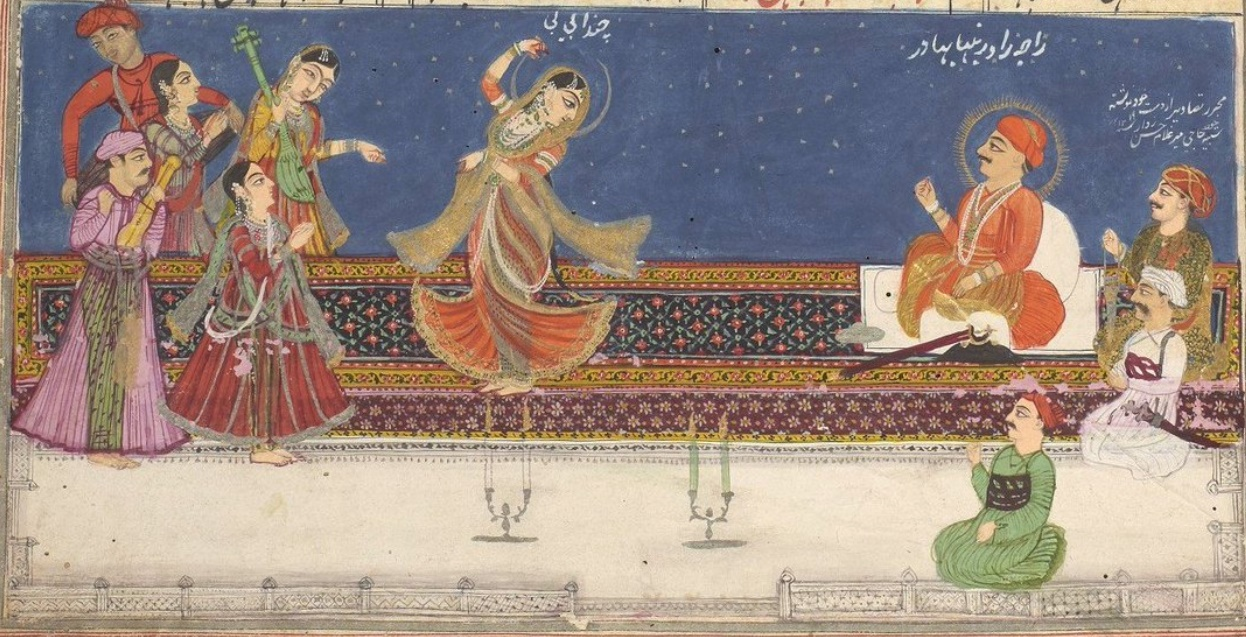
Tawaif Mah Laqa Bai dancing in court

Like the geisha tradition in Japan, their main purpose was to professionally entertain their guests, and while sex was often incidental, it was not assured contractually. High-class or the most popular tawaifs could often pick and choose among the best of their suitors. Tawaifs performed at temples during holidays and participated in temple celebrations, which had been passed down from generation to generation. They also had the tradition of performing at the Burhwa Mangal bazaar in the spring after Holi. Such events provided a significant platform for tawaifs, not just for the patronage but also for the opportunity it offered for tawaifs to showcase their skills to general audiences and, thereby, retain societal acceptability for their trade. Due to their popularity, many dancing girls became very wealthy. According to Portuguese traveller Domingo Paes, dancing girls were fabulously rich. Domingo was "struck by their collars of gold studded with diamonds, rubies and pearls, bracelets on their arms, girdles below and, of necessity, anklets on their feet."

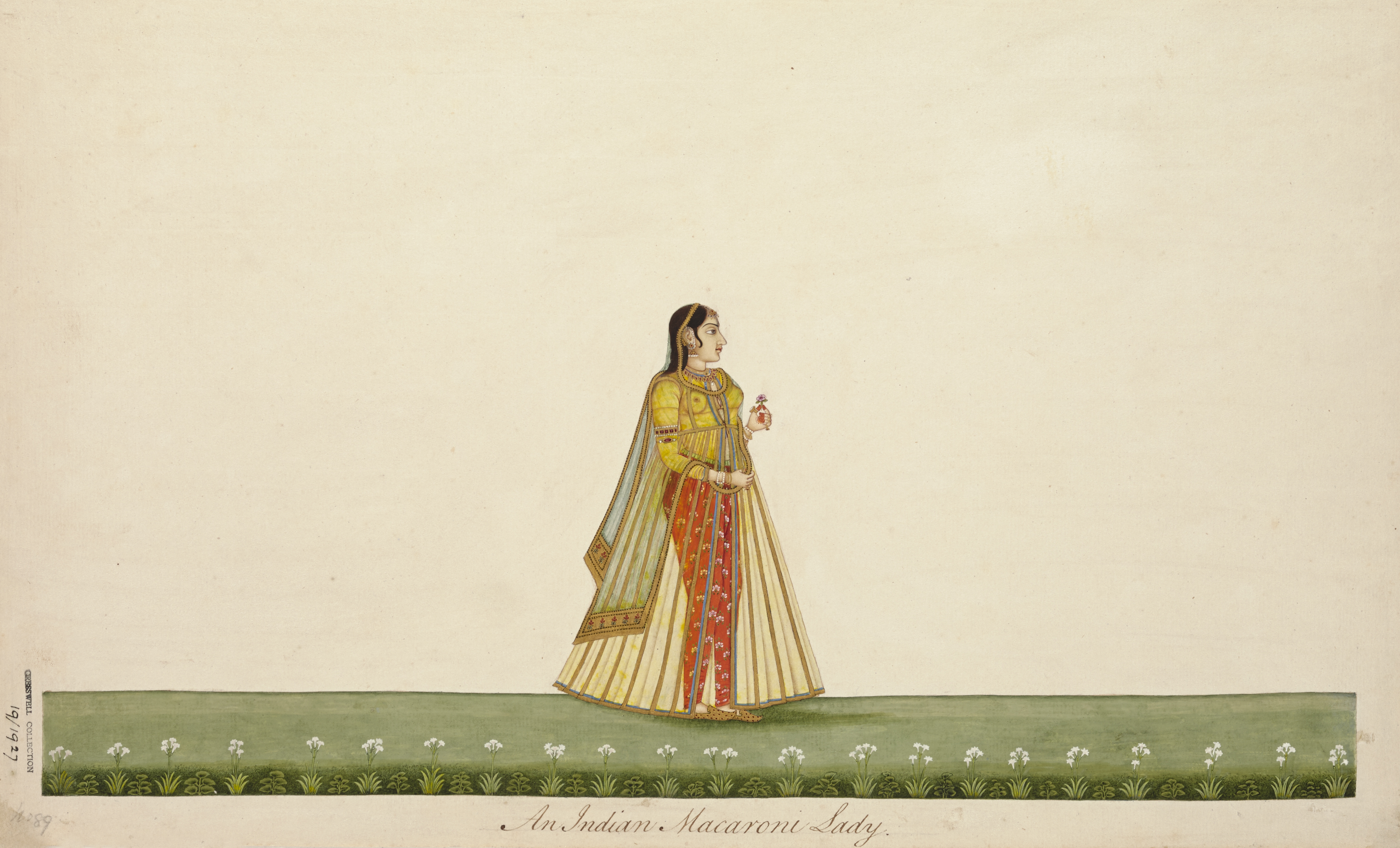
Painting of a Tawaif from 1931. She would be accomplished in the arts of music, dancing and poetry and would entertain the men of the court, particularly in Moghul India. Her elegance and expensive gold-embroidered veil show her high status.

There were hierarchies among the performing artists, and the tawaifs were at the top, a class distinct from street performers and prostitutes. Tawaif kothas, where the tawaifs often lived and performed, would host meetings of local intelligentsia, presided mostly by the most senior tawaif of the kotha. Tawaifs enjoyed influence among writers, journalists and poets. The poets longed for a tawaif to sing their works and asked the famous tawaif if she could sing his poems. In those days, having tawaif perform their own work was a way to ensure that poetry would be remembered and passed down from generation to generation. A Tawaif had an unconventional approach to relationships, where female performers were expected to remain unmarried but were permitted to have relationships with patrons. Tawaifs traditionally served loyal mistresses to wealthy patrons. Only once a relationship was terminated, either due to the death of their patron or a mutual decision to part ways, would a tawaif look to enter into another relationship.

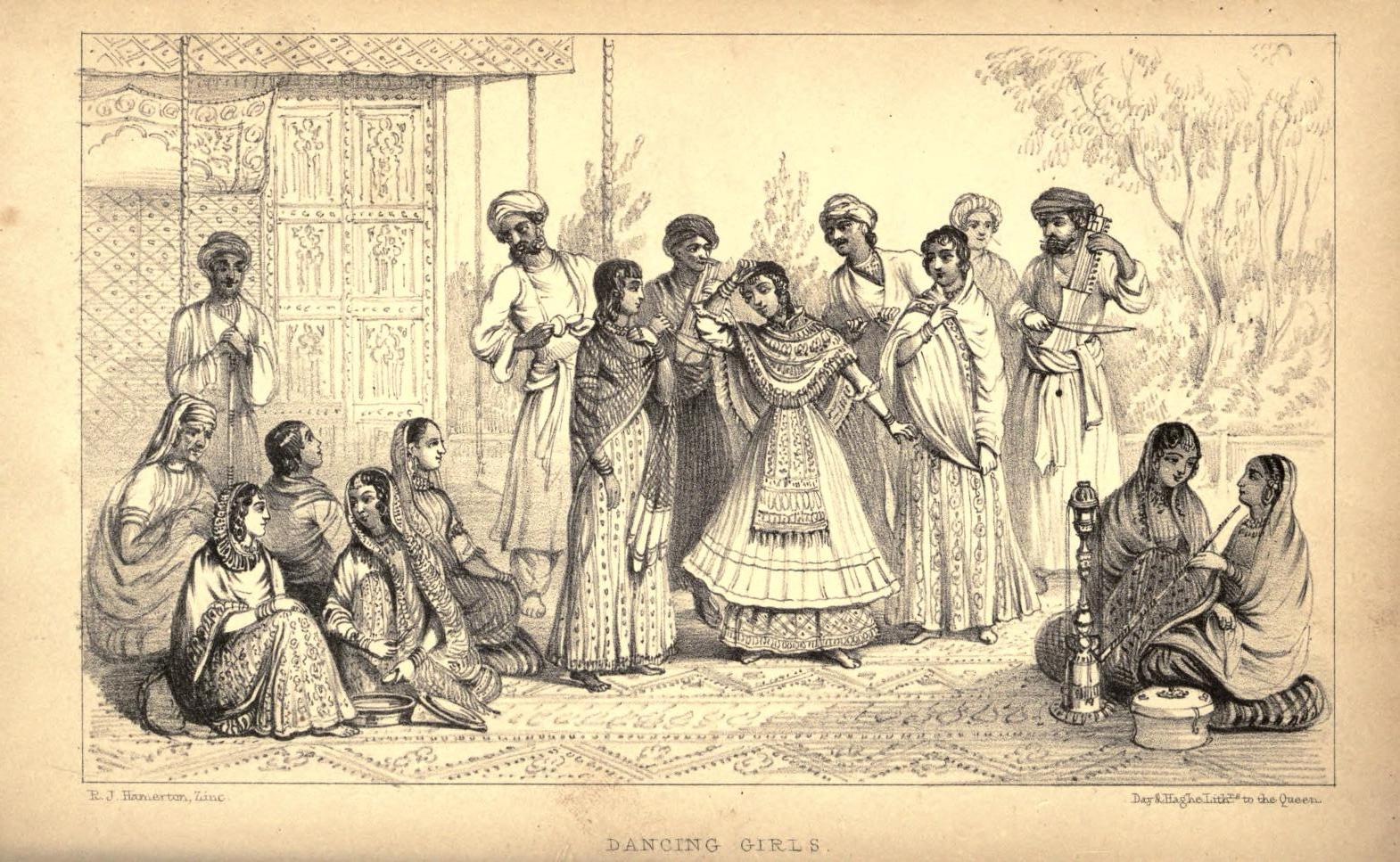
Lithograph titled 'Dancing Girls', from 'The Court and Camp of Runjeet Sing' by William Godolphin Osborne, 1840

A contemporary account by Baron Hugel of a courtesan of the Sikh Empire named Khairan is as follows:

I shall not soon forget the expression with which the girl (a dancer called Kaira [sic]) sang… Throwing herself at the same time at the listener's feet, her features lighted up, as though beseeching for a hearing, and her hands clasping his knee…She moved away, her hand raised, and her head thrown back; while she threw an expression of despair into the last line, and seemed to sob out the words... She presently steps forward, the soft slow music becomes louder and quicker, as the expression becomes more impassioned; the dancer, describing either hope or fear, moves rapidly from side to side, and the whole usually concludes with an imitation of despair.

— Baron Hugel, Travels in Kashmir and the Panjab, containing a particular account of the government and character of the Sikhs, translated and with notes by T. B. Jervis, J. Petheram, London, 1845, page 345

However, by the time the British Raj had annexed Punjab, the services of tawaifs were no longer valued, and even the most highly trained dancing girls were reviled as lewd by the Victorian standards of the British. Despite this, British men were happy to take local women as concubines and mistresses but were uninterested in becoming patrons of the formerly well tolerated tawaifs of Lahore, and even less interested in spending lavish sums upon them.

== British colonial period ==
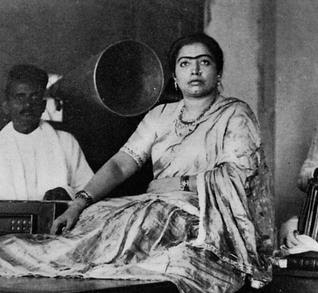
Singer and dancer, Gauhar Jaan (1873–1930)

The annexation of Oudh by the East India Company in 1856 sounded the first death knell for this medieval-era institution. It was soon looked down upon with disfavour by the colonial government, and some tawaifs entered into prostitution due to a lack of employment opportunities. Social reformers in India opposed them as social decadence. But some tawaif and institutions still survived until India's independence in 1947. The tawaifs had actively participated in anti-British actions behind the scenes. Their buildings, known as "kothas", became meeting areas and hiding places for anti-British elements. Those tawaifs who accumulated wealth provided financial support to anti-British elements. Some tawaifs suffered retaliation from colonial authorities. Their kotha was searched and their belongings confiscated. The Victorian-era morality project placed a premium on women's chastity and domesticity. As public performers, tawaifs were equated with prostitutes and their kothas were branded as brothels. Mujra dance originally did not refer to vulgar dance, but an elegant and ceremonial dance, usually performed by tawaif. During the British colonial period, some tawaifs became prostitute. The distinction between prostitutes and tawaifs began to blur. Some prostitutes also called their erotic dances mujra dance. Mujra dance gradually became associated with sex and prostitution.

== Decline ==
After the British colonization, although more brothels and prostitutes were operating in Heera Mandi, there were still tawaif performing activities in the area, Heera Mandi retained its reputation as a centre of the performing arts. After the partition, young and attractive tawaifs from Heera Mandi became the first choice of Pakistan filmmakers. Tawaifs from Heera Mandi joined the Lollywood industry and gained much fame and wealth. Some of the most skilled tawaifs performed as backup dancers in early Pakistan films. In Heera Mandi and surrounding areas, there were many dance classrooms and music classrooms, which were closed as the tawaifs and musicians left.

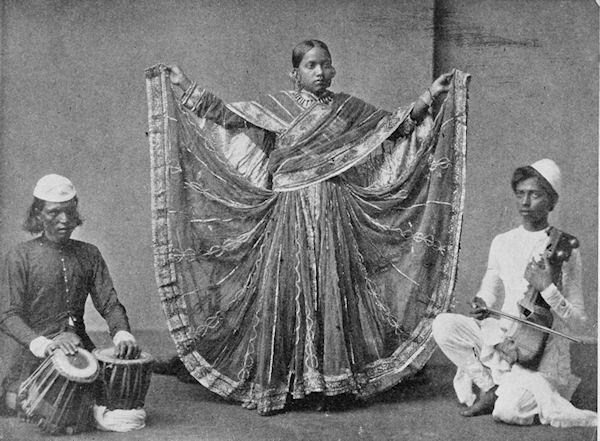
Nautch dancer or Tawaif in Calcutta, c. 1900

With the development of time, the tawaif in India has gradually disappeared. In the 1980s, when kothas were no longer recognized as centres for aesthetics, and society disapproved of the tawaif's art, as they felt it was sex work in the guise of adakari (performance). It was an era when tawaifs had to dodge guns, goons and Ghalib's ghazals. The tawaifs who are still performing no longer have the same literary education as before, but they are not sex workers, "a courtesan is no less than a circus performer, balancing a bottle on her head". They are all trained in Kathak, to regale the men who visit them in the evenings. Another skill they are expected to master is singing. Tawaifs are versed in ghazals, hori and thumris, but many now know just enough to earn a livelihood. In addition to performing at kotha, tawaifs also performed during weddings at home, celebrations of child birth and other festivities, provided the entertainment of singing and dancing. The 1993 Bow Bazaar bomb blast in Calcutta brought an end to the kothas in the busy commercial district. As dance bars and disco music replaced mujras, kathak and thumri, the tawaifs abandoned the profession.

== Famous Tawaif ==
Some of the most prominent tawaifs in history were Anarkali, Mah Laqa Bai, Bhagmati, Lal Kunwar, Qudsia Begum, Zainabadi Mahal, Mubarak Begum, Nur Bai, and Begum Samru (who rose to rule the principality of Sardhana in western Uttar Pradesh), Moran Sarkar (who became the wife of Maharaja Ranjit Singh), Wazeeran (patronised by Lucknow's last nawab Wajid Ali Shah), Begum Hazrat Mahal (Wajid Ali's first wife who played an important role in the Indian Rebellion).

A number of television and film actresses and singers from Pakistan were tawaifs.

- Begum Akhtar (7 October 1914 – 30 October 1974), Indian singer and actress, known as "Mallika-e-Ghazal" (Queen of Ghazals).
- Binodini Dasi (1862–1941), Indian actress, pioneering entrepreneur of the Bengali stage.
- Fatma Begum (1892–1983), Indian actress, director and screenwriter.
- Husna Bai, thumri singer.
- Jaddanbai (1892–1949), Indian master music composer, singer, actress, and film maker, and her mother Daleepabai.
- Janki Bai (1880–1934), Indian singer, poet and classical singer. She was famously known as The Star of Gramaphone.
- Rattan Bai (15 July 1890 – 1 January 1986), Indian actress and singer.
- Kajjanbai (15 February 1915 – 20 December 1945) Indian singer and actress, often referred to as the "Nightingale of Bengal".
- Kajjan Begum (24 January 1932 – 10 February 2000) Pakistani classical singer and playback singer.
- Malika Pukhraj (1912–2004), Pakistani ghazal and folk singer.
- Malka Jaan, and daughter Gauhar Jaan (1873–1930), who created the first Indian song recording in 1902.
- Mukhtar Begum (12 July 1901 – 25 February 1982), Pakistani classical, ghazal singer and actress. She was known as The Queen of Music for singing songs in films and on radio.
- Chamiyan Bai (1898 – 14 August 1998), Indian singer and classical singer. She was also known as Shamshad Begum and was known as The Queen of Music. She is the mother of Naseem Banu and grandmother of Saira Banu.
- Rasoolan Bai (1902 – 15 December 1974), Indian Hindustani classical music vocal musician.
- Roshan Ara Begum (1917 – 6 December 1982), vocalist belonging to the Kirana gharana of Hindustani classical music. She is also known by her honorific title Malika-e-Mauseeqi (The Queen of Music) in both Pakistan and India.
- Shobha Gurtu (1925–2004), Indian singer in the light Hindustani classical style, known as The Thumri Queen.
- Zarina Begum of Lucknow (1930 – 12 May 2018), Indian classical singer.
- Zohrabai (1868–1913), Hindustani classical singer of the Agra gharana.
- Zeenat Begum (11 November 1931 – 11 December 2007), Pakistani singer, known as "The Queen of Yesteryear" for singing songs in films and on radio.
- Tamancha Jan (10 July 1918 – 20 October 2008), Pakistani folk singer, known as "The Singing Siren" and "The Nightingale of Lahore".
- Amy Minwalla, Pakistani Kathak dancer and film actress.

== Cultural influences ==
"Tawaifs & Kothas" cultural tour initiated by "Enroute Indian History". Explore the lives of the tawaifs or dancing girls on a heritage walk through the streets of Shahjahanabad with Enroute Indian History.

== Popular culture ==
=== In films ===
The image of the tawaif has had an enduring appeal, immortalized in Bollywood and Lollywood movies and Pakistani dramas. Films with a tawaif as a character include:

==== India ====
- Devdas (1935)
- Devdas (1936)
- Devdas (1937)
- Anhonee (1952)
- Anarkali (1953)
- Devadasu (1953)
- Chandni Chowk (1954)
- Mirza Ghalib (1954)
- Devdas (1955)
- Anarkali (1955)
- Mehndi (1958)
- Zindagi Ya Toofan (1958)
- Jalsaghar (1958)
- Mughal-E-Azam (1960)
- Sahib Bibi Aur Ghulam (1962)
- Uttar Falguni (1963)
- Mujhe Jeene Do (1963)
- Benazir (1964)
- Devdas (1965)
- Kaajal (1965)
- Mamta (1966)
- Teesri Kasam (1966)
- Anarkali (1966)
- Bahu Begum (1967)
- Mere Huzoor (1968)
- Sunghursh (1968)
- Kaviya Thalaivi (1970)
- Sharafat (1970)
- Aansoo Aur Muskan (1970)
- Khilona (1970)
- Pakeezah (1972)
- Gomti Ke Kinare (1972)
- Amar Prem (1972)
- Dharma (1973)
- Pran Jaye Par Vachan Na Jaye (1974)
- Devadasu (1974)
- Sharafat Chhod Di Maine (1976)
- Harmonium (1976)
- Shatranj Ke Khilari (1977)
- Kasme Vaade (1978)
- Muqaddar Ka Sikandar (1978)
- Devadasu Malli Puttadu (1978)
- Suhaag (1979)
- Umrao Jaan (1981)
- Daasi (1981)
- Deedaar-e-Yaar (1982)
- Prem Tapasya (1983)
- Ghungroo (1983)
- Maati Maangey Khoon (1984)
- Tawaif (1985)
- Angaaray (1986)
- Maa Beti (1986)
- Pati Patni Aur Tawaif (1990)
- Dil Aashna Hai (1992)
- In Custody (1993)
- Sardari begum (1996)
- Devdas (2002)
- Mangal Pandey: The Rising (2005)
- Kisna: The Warrior Poet (2005)
- Bhagmati (2005)
- Umrao Jaan (2006)
- Yatra (2006)
- Devdas (2010)
- The Black Woman (2011) (depicts a tawaif in a supporting role, often in situations where a man in a loveless marriage goes to her.)
- Dedh Ishqiya (2014)
- Jaanisaar (2015)
- Thugs Of Hindostan (2018)
- Ek Je Chhilo Raja (2018)
- Kalank (2019)
- Hamidabai Ki Kothi (2019)
- Qala (2022)

==== Pakistan ====
- Anarkali (1958)
- Ghalib (1961)
- Anjuman (1970)
- Insan Aur Aadmi (1970)
- Afshan (1971)
- Bazaar (1972)
- Umrao Jaan Ada (1972)
- Deedar (1974)
- Izzat (1975)
- Surraya Bhopali (1976)
- Society Girl (1976)
- Aadmi (1978)
- Pakeeza (1979)
- Maang Meri Bhar Do (1983)
- Naam Mera Badnam (1984)
- Bazar-e-Husn (1988)
- Mehbooba (1992)
- Aakhri Mujra (1994)
- Mahnoor (2004)
- Mah e Mir (2016)
- Huey Tum Ajnabi (2023)

=== In documentary films ===
- The Courtesans of Bombay (1983)
- The Other Song (2009)

=== In Indian television ===
- Umrao jaan Ada (2014)
- Lajwanti (2015)
- Bhabiji Ghar Par Hain! (2015)
- Dastaan-E-Mohabbat Salim Anarkali (2018)
- A Suitable Boy (TV series) (2020)
- Jubilee (TV series) (2023)
- Heeramandi:The Diamond Bazaar (2024)

=== In Pakistani television ===
- Aik Muhabbat Soo Afsanay (1974), PTV drama
- Anarkali (1988), PTV drama
- Pyas (1989), PTV drama
- Chand Grehan (1995), drama on STN
- Red Card (1995), drama on STN
- Samandar Hai Darmiyan (1998)
- Ghulam Gardish (1998)
- Umrao Jaan Ada (2003)
- Aatish (2004), PTV drama
- Adhoray Khawab (2004)
- Bazar (2004), PTV telefilm based on story by Saadat Hasan Manto
- Kaantay (2004), PTV drama
- Bheegi Palkain (2005)
- Makan Aka Home a Heaven (2006)
- Bhool (2006), PTV drama
- Sitam (2006), PTV drama
- Mithaas (2007), PTV drama
- Jhumka Jaan (2007)
- Yeh Zindagi Hai (2008)
- Mere Humnasheen (2009), a television film
- Saza Aur Jaza (2010), PTV drama
- Quddusi Sahab Ki Bewah (2012)
- Chand Chehra (2013)
- Mera Ishq Bhi Tu (2013)
- Bhool (2013)
- Anjuman (2013), a television film
- Mein Sitara (2016)
- Alif Allah Aur Insaan (2017)
- Kahan Ho Tum(2018)
- Alif (2019)
- Deewar-e-Shab (2019)
- Raqs e Bismil (2020)
- Khuda Aur Mohabbat (2021)
- Pehli Si Muhabbat (2021)
- Badzaat (2022)
- Dil Awaiz (2022)
- Nauroz (2023)
- Motia Sarkar (2023)
- Namak Haram (2024)
- Neeli Kothi (2025)
- Ghulam Bashah Sundri (2026)

=== In literature ===
- Tawaifnama by Saba Dewan
- Mera Naam Gauhar Jaan Hai by Vikram Sampath
- TABOO: The Hidden Culture of a Red Light District by Fouzia Saeed
- Umrao Jaan Ada novel by Mirza Hadi Ruswa
- Nashtar novel by Hasan Shah
- Bazar story by Saadat Hasan Manto
- The Last Courtesan by Manish Gaekwad
- Song Sung True by Malika Pukhraj
- Akhtari : The Life and Music of Begum Akhtar by Yatindra Mishra, Maneesha Taneja
- Nautch Girls of India by Pran Nevile
- The Unsung Martyred Tawayafs by Dr. K.S. Bhardwaj
- Dance to Freedom by A.K. Gandhi

== See also ==
- Similar professions in other cultures
  - Almah, a similar profession in the Middle East
  - Ca trù, a similar profession in Vietnam
  - Geisha, a similar profession in Japan
  - Shirabyōshi, a similar profession in Japan
  - Kisaeng, a similar profession in Korea
  - Qiyan, a similar profession in the pre-modern Islamic world
  - Nagarvadhu, a similar profession in ancient India
  - Gaṇikā, a similar profession in ancient India
  - Shamakhi dancers, a similar profession in Azerbaijan
  - Gējì, a similar profession in China
- Similar topics in India
  - Bargirl
  - Dance bar
  - Mujra
  - Nautch
  - Devdasi
- Related topics
  - Prostitution in colonial India
  - Prostitution in India
  - Prostitution in Pakistan
