= Mubarak Begum Mosque =

Mosque in Hauz Qazi, Shahjahanabad, Delhi, India

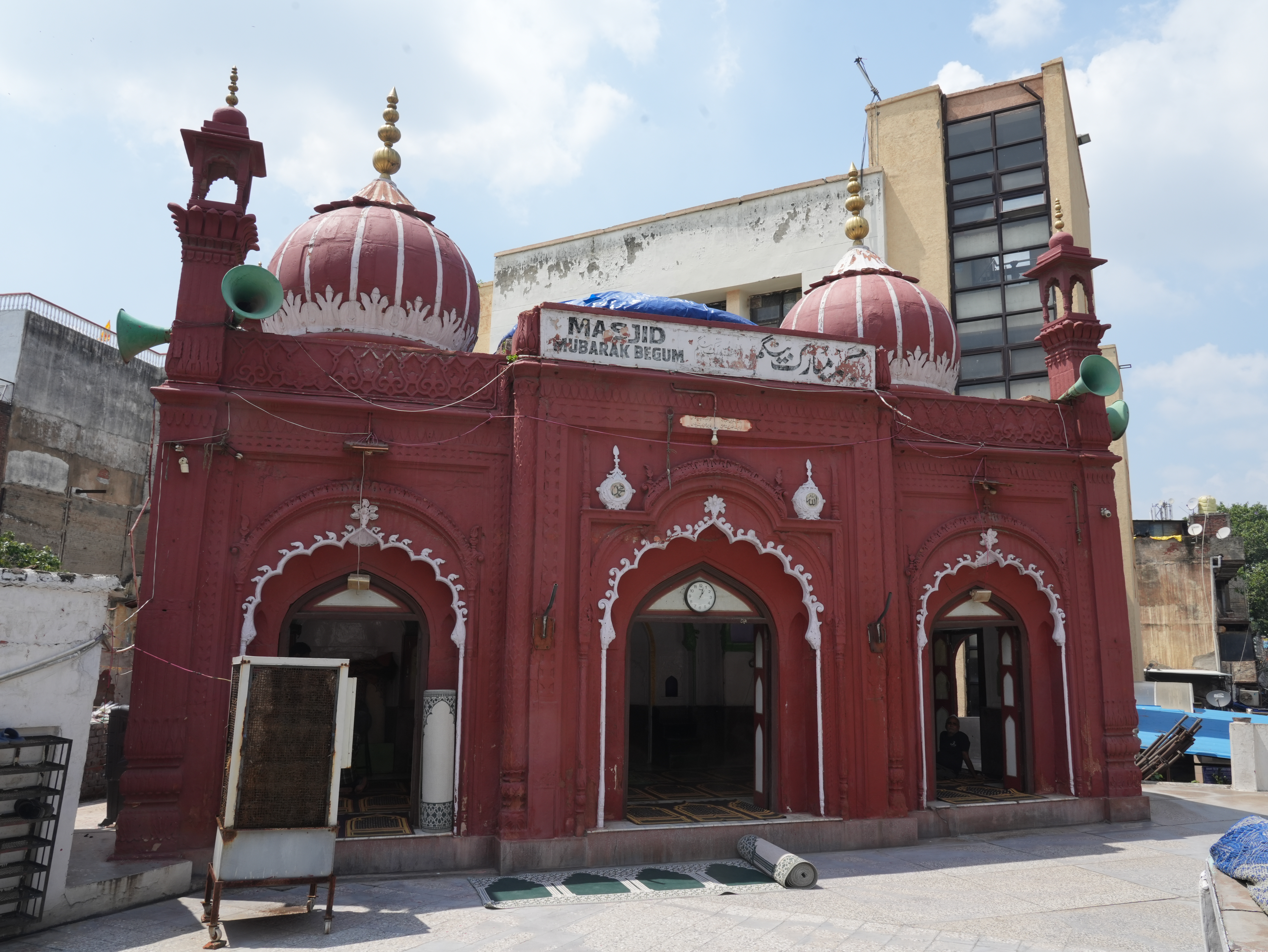
- The mosque in 2024

- Location of the mosque in Central Delhi

Religion
- Affiliation: Islam
- Ecclesiastical or organizational status: Mosque
- Ownership: Delhi Wakf Board
- Status: Active

Location
- Location: Hauz Qazi, Old Delhi, Delhi NCT
- Country: India
- Interactive map of Mubarak Begum Mosque
- Coordinates: 28°39′00″N 77°13′34″E

Architecture
- Type: Mosque architecture
- Style: Indo-Islamic; Mughal
- Founder: Sir David Ochterlony
- Completed: 1823

Specifications
- Dome: Three
- Materials: Red sandstone; lakhori bricks

The Mubarak Begum Mosque, also known as Randi ki Masjid (lit. 'Prostitute's Mosque'), is a 19th-century red sandstone mosque, located in Hauz Qazi, Old Delhi, Delhi, India. The Mughal-style mosque is also referred to as courtesan's (tawaif's) mosque, and is located near the Chawri Bazaar metro station.

On 19 July 2020, at approximately 6:45 am, part of the mosque's central dome collapsed due to heavy rainfall. The mosque is under the custody of Delhi Wakf Board. Closed for a period of time, as of 2024, the mosque was open for worship.

== History ==
The mosque was built in the early decades of the 19th century in 1823 by a nautch dancer called Mubarak Begum who also served as a tawaif in the Mughal court. The mosque was built during the Mughal era.

Mubarak Begum was born into a poor Muslim family initially pursued her career as a dancing girl in Pune.

When East India Company was established in India, Britishers made it compulsory for army men to either come along with their wives, or marry native women temporarily. "No Indian families would've agreed, so these ladies were their only recourse." Delhi's first British resident, Sir David Ochterlony, a two-time British resident to Mughal emperor's court in Delhi in 1802 and in 1822, married Mubarak Begum. He built the mosque in her honour. "For the first time, a nautch girl, not royalty, had commissioned a mosque and so Randi ki Masjid became the informal name."

After the death of Mubarak Begum in 1878, control of the mosque was assumed by the British government. It is one of the three mosques to be constructed by women in India.

== Architecture ==
The mosque is built of red sandstone and lakhori bricks as a two-storey structure. The upper floor consists of prayer chamber containing three domed compartments. It also comprises three red and white striped domes and three arched entrances under each dome. It was reported that the mosque was repaired and maintained in 2016 and was in active use in 2024.

== Gallery ==
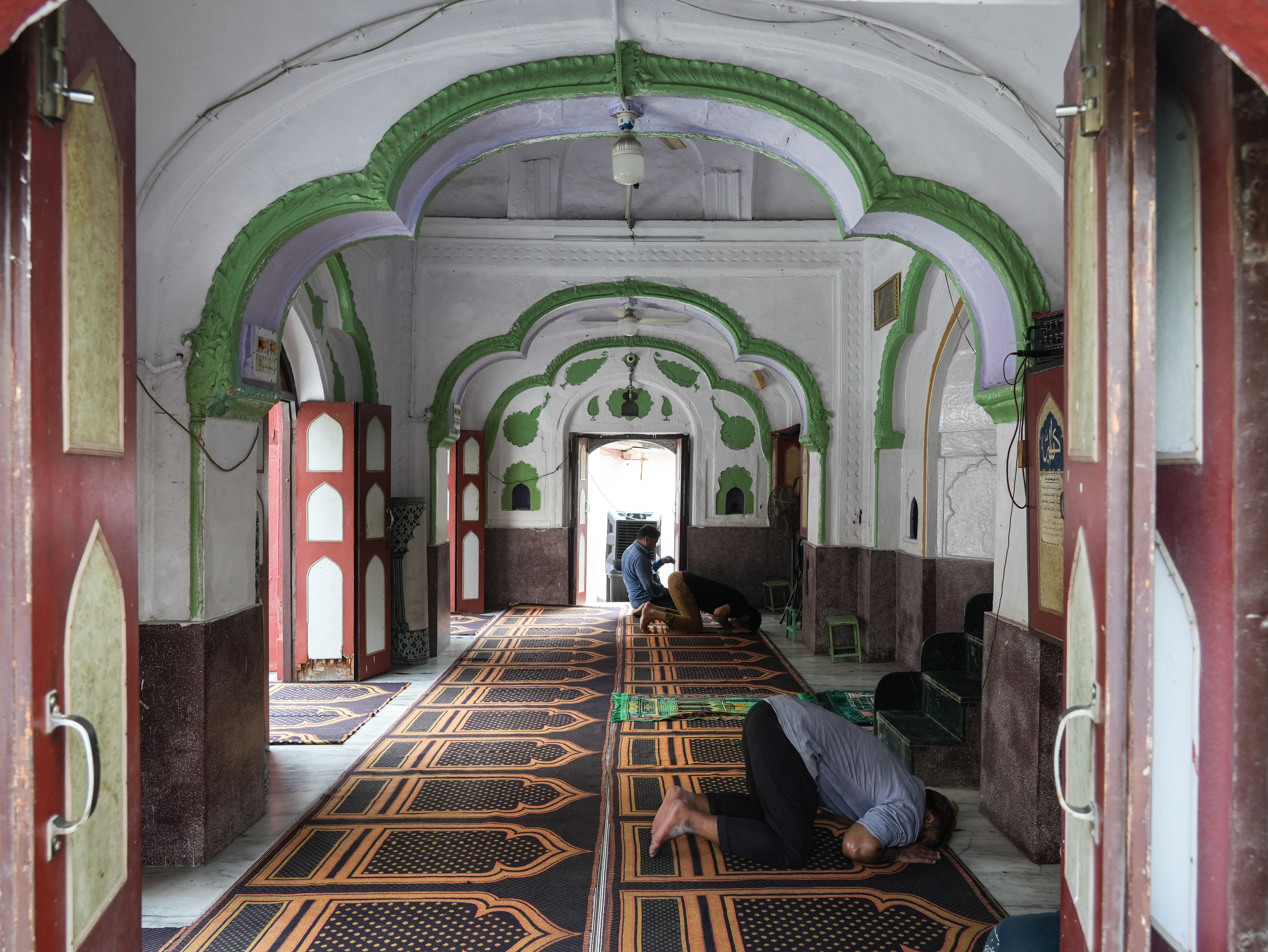
Worshippers praying at the mosque in 2024

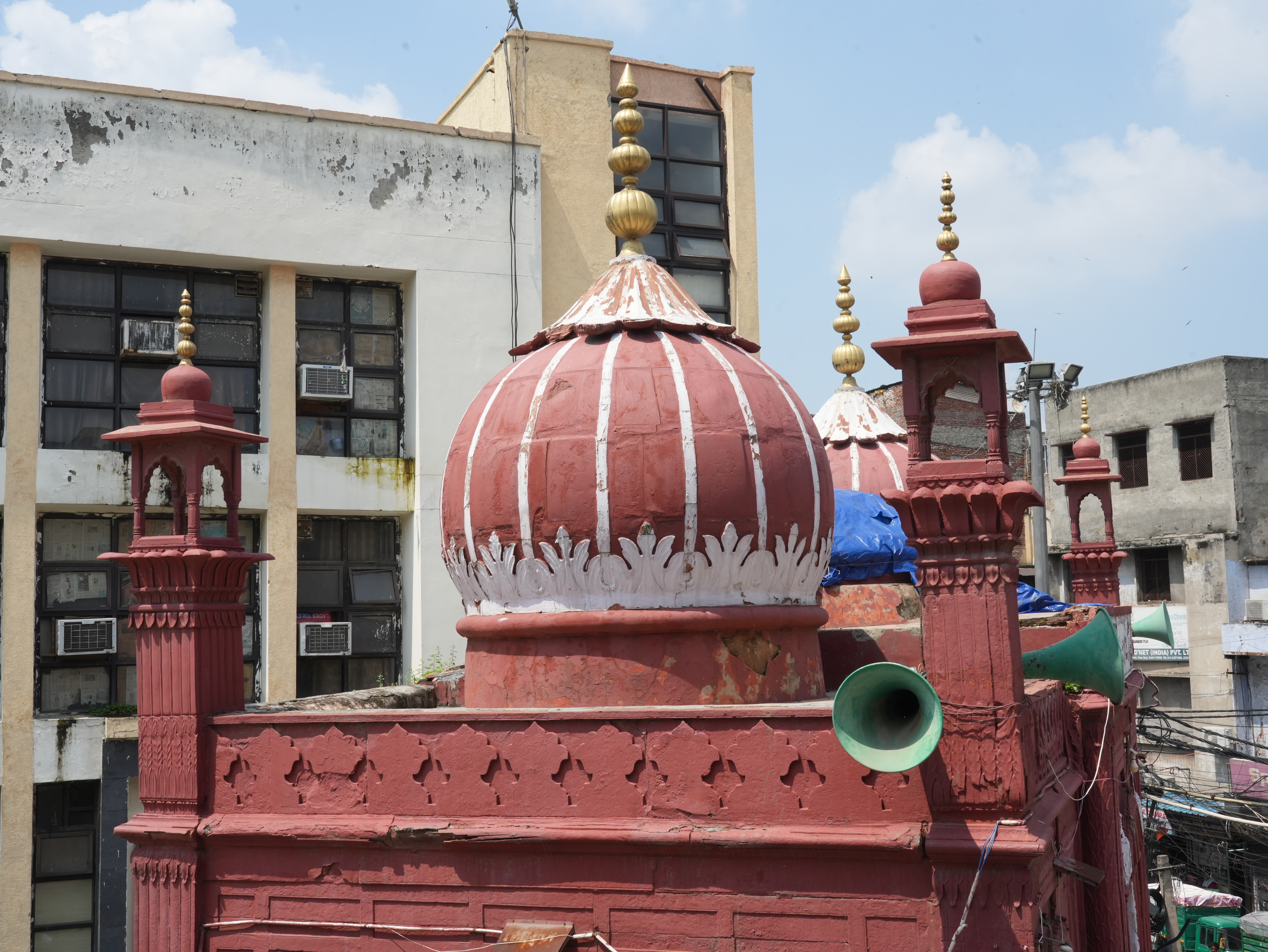
Mughal-style domes in 2024

== See also ==
- Islam in India
- List of mosques in India
