= List of Begum Akhtar songs =

Screenshot from Roti, 1942

This is a list of songs recorded or performed by Begum Akhtar (1914–1974), an Indian singer of Hindustani classical music. Akhtar, who was also an actress, was proficient at dadra, thumri, and ghazals. Cited as "one of India's finest ghazal singers", she was referred to as Mallika-E-Tarannum or Mallika-e-Ghazal (Queen of Ghazals). Akhtar's first recording was a combination of ghazals and dadras for the His Master's Voice label. She recorded or performed a total of 167 songs during her career, among which twenty were for films.

Akhtar's performances were in the nature of a classical presentation, with the accompaniment of the tabla, sitar, and harmonium. Her rendering of Ghalib's ghazals made her a household name.

Born Akhtaribai Faizabadi, she begaan her career as a mehfil singer and became famous when she sang at the Bihar earthquake music conference in 1934. On the basis of her popularity, she received offers to appear in films, starting her career with Ek Din Ka Badshah and Nal Damayanti (1933), produced by the East India Company, in Calcutta. In 1942, Akhtar was cast by Mehboob Khan in the film Roti, in which she both sang and acted. In 1945, she married Ishtiaq Ahmed Abbasi, Nawab of Kakoli, putting her career on hold for five years. She returned to film with Dana Pani (1953) and Ehsan (1954). After 1956, Akhtar stopped working in film but continued performing on stage. Her repertoire included the ghazals of Mirza Ghalib, Momin, Faiz Ahmed Faiz, Jigar Moradabadi, Shakeel Badayuni, Mir Taqi Mir, Sauda, and Shamim Jaipuri.

== Non-film ==
=== Poets ===
Poet	No.	Song	Notes	Composer	ref
Jan Nisar Akhtar	1	"Bujhi Hui Shama Ka Dhuan"	Traditional	Murli Manohar Swarup	
Kaifi Azmi	2	"Itna To Zindagi Me Kisi Ki Khalal Pade"	Traditional		
Shakeel Badayuni	3	"Ae Mohabbat Tere Anjaam Pe Rona Aaya"	Traditional	Murli Manohar Swarup	
Shakeel Badayuni	4	"Door Hain Manzil Raahein Mushkil"	Raga Pilu	Mohammed Zahur Khaiyyam	
Shakeel Badayuni	5	"Mere Humnafas Mere Humnawa"			
Shakeel Badayuni	6	"Ye Maikhana Hai"		Khaiyyam	
Shakeel Badayuni	7	"Khush Hoon Ke Mera Husn-E-Talab Kaam Toh Aaya"			
Shakeel Badayuni	8	"Sahabae Garaj Thi Shola Phish"			
Shakeel Badayuni	9	"Sharab-E-Naab Ko"	Ghazal	Khaiyyam	
Shakeel Badayuni	10	"Zindagi Ka Dard Lekar"	Traditional	Khaiyyam	
Khumar Barabankvi	11	"Jhunjlae Hain Lajaaye Hain"		Murli Manohar Swarup	
Behzad Lucknavi	12	"Diwana Banaana Hai To Diwana Bana De"	Traditional	Begum Akhtar	
Behzad Lucknavi	13	"Kash Itna Mere Naalon Mein Asar Ho Jaaye"	Ghazal		
Behzad Lucknavi	14	"Un Aankhon Ka Aalam Gulabi Gulabi"	Ghazal		
Daagh Dehlvi	15	"Rasm-e-Ulfat Sikha Gaya Koyi"	Ghazal		
Daagh Dehlvi	16	"Uzr Aane Mein Bhi Hai Aur Bulate Bhi Nahin"	Traditional	Khaiyyam	
Daagh Dehlvi	17	"Ulti Ho Gain Sab Tadabiren"	Ghazal		
Faiz Ahmed Faiz	18	"Sham-E-Firaq Ab Na Poochh"	Traditional	Khaiyyam	
Faiz Ahmed Faiz	19	"Aaye Kuchh Abr Kuchh Sharab Aaye"	Ghazal		
Faiz Ahmed Faiz	20	"Donon Jahan Teri Mohabbat Mein Haar Ke"	Ghazal		
Sudarshan Fakir	21	"Apanon Ke Sitam Ham Se Bataae Nahin Jaate"	Ghazal	Begum Akhtar	
Sudarshan Fakir	22	"Ishq Mein Ghairat-e-Jazbat"	Ghazal	Khaiyyam	
Sudarshan Fakir	23	"Koyalia Mat Kar Pukar"	Raga Manj Khamaj	Khaiyyam	
Sudarshan Fakir	24	"Kuchh Toh Duniya Ki Inaayat Ne Dil Tod Diya"	Traditional		
Sudarshan Fakir	25	"Laila Majnu Ke Misaalon Pe Hansi Aati"	Ghazal	Khaiyyam	
Firaq Gorakhpuri	26	"Sar Mein Sauda Bhi Nahin"	Traditional	Murli Manohar Swarup	
Mirza Ghalib	27	"Aah Ko Chahiiye Ek Umar Asar Hone Tak"	Traditional		
Mirza Ghalib	28	"Bas Ke Dushwar"			
Mirza Ghalib	29	"Dayam Pada Hua Tere Dar Par"	Traditional		
Mirza Ghalib	30	"Dard Minnat Kash-E-Dawa Na Hua"	Traditional		
Mirza Ghalib	31	"Dil Hi To Hai Na Sung-O-Khisht"	Traditional		
Mirza Ghalib	32	"Ibn-E-Mariyam Hua Kare Koi"	Traditional	Khaiyyam	
Mirza Ghalib	33	"Koi Umeed Bar Nahin Aati"	Traditional		
Mirza Ghalib	34	"Phir Mujhe Deeda-E-Tar Yaad Aaya"	Traditional		
Mirza Ghalib	35	"Rahiye Ab Aisi Jagah Chalkar Jahan Koi Na Ho"			
Mirza Ghalib	36	"Sab Kahan Kuchh Laal-o-Gul"			
Mirza Ghalib	37	"Taskin Ko Hum Na Royein"	Traditional	Khaiyyam	
Mirza Ghalib	38	"Yeh Na Thi Hamari Kismet"	Traditional	Khaiyyam	
Mirza Ghalib	39	"Zikr Us Parivash Ka"	Traditional	Khaiyyam	
Shamim Jaipuri	40	"Bazm Se Unki Ham Kya Laaye"	Traditional		
Shamim Jaipuri	41	"Ilahi Kash Ghum-E-Ishq"	Ghazal		
Shamim Jaipuri	42	"Nao Saahil Pe Dagmagai Hai"	Ghazal		
Shamim Jaipuri	43	"Na Socha Na Samjha"	Ghazal		
Shamim Jaipuri	44	"Sakht Hai Ishq Ki Rehguzar"	Ghazal		
Shamim Jaipuri	45	"Zameen Pe Rah Kar Dimaag Aasman Pe Rehta Hai	Ghazal		
Ali Ahmed Jaleeli	46	"Ab Chhalakte Hue Sagar Nahin Dekhe Jaate"	Ghazal	Begum Akhtar	
Ali Ahmed Jaleeli	47	"Khushi Ne Mujhko Thukraya"	Ghazal	Khaiyyam	
Fana Nizami Kanpuri	48	"Jab Bhi Nazam-E-Maikada Badla Gaya"	Ghazal	Murli Manohar Swarup	
Fana Nizami Kanpuri	49	"Mere Chehre Se Gham Aashkara"		Murli Manohar Swarup	
Mir Taqi Mir	50	"Ulti Ho Gayin Sab Tadbirein"	Ghazal		
Mir Taqi Mir	51	"Dil Ki Baat Kahin Nahi Jaati"	Traditional		
Amir Minai	52	"Haalaat Maikade Ke Karwat"	Ghazal		
Jigar Moradabadi	53	"Koi Yeh Keh De Gulshan Gulshan"	Ghazal	Begum Akhtar	
Jigar Moradabadi	54	"Duniya Ke Sitam Yaad"	Traditional		
Jigar Moradabadi	55	"Hum Ko Mita Sakay Yeh Zamanay May Dam Nahin"			
Jigar Moradabadi	56	"Is Ishq Ke Haathon Se Hargis"		Khaiyyam	
Jigar Moradabadi	57	"Kya Cheez Gham-E-Ishq Ki"			
Jigar Moradabadi	58	"Saqiya Chhod Na Khaali"		Khaiyyam	
Jigar Moradabadi	59	"Tabiyat in Dinon Begana-E-Gam Hoti Jaati Hai"			
Momin	60	"Woh Jo Hum Mein Tum Mein Qarar Tha"		Khaiyyam	
Amir Qazalbash	61	"Unki Berukhi Mein Bhi"	Ghazal	Murli Manhar Swarup	
Taskeen Qureshi	62	"Ab Toh Yehi Hain Dil Ki Duaayein"	Traditional		
Taskeen Qureshi	63	"Kis Se Poochhein'	Ghazal		
Taskeen Qureshi	64	"Khayal-E-Kaba-Otaiba"	Ghazal	Khaiyyam	
Saeed	65	"Abhi Josh-e-Baharaan Dekhna Hai"	Traditional		
Saeed	66	"Phoolon Ki Rut Hai Thandi Hawaaen"			
Shaz Tamkanat	67	"Mere Naseeb Ne Jab Mujh Se"	Traditional	Murli Manhar Swarup	
Mirza Rafi Sauda	68	"Gul Phenke Hain"	Ghazal		
Zauq	69	"Laayi Hayaat Aaye Qaza Le Chali Chale"	Traditional	Khaiyyam	

=== Other ===
No.	Song	Notes	Composer	ref
70	"Aaye Balam Karam More Jaage"	Dadra in Mishra Khamaj, Tal Kaharwa		
71	"Ab Kaisi Kati Mori Sooni Sejariya"	Thumri in Mishra Pilu Kafi, Tal Chaanchar		
72	"Ab Ke Sawan Ghar Aa Ja"	Thumri (Sawan)		
73	"Ada-e-Naaz Ko Zaalim"	Qawali		
74	"Ashkon Mein Koi Husn Hi Paya Nahin Jaata"	Ghazal		
75	"Badar Dekh Dari"	Dadra		
76	"Bahut Din Beete"	Thumri		
77	"Balamwa Tum Kya Jaano Preet"	Dadra in Mishra Madhukauns, Tal Kaharwa		
78	"Balamwa Tum Kya Jaano Preet"	Dadra in Mishra Kirwani, Tal Kaharwa		
79	"Chahe Kachhu Hoye"	Thumri		
80	"Chha Rahi Kali Ghata"	Dadra in Gaud Malhar		
81	"Dil Mein Teri Nisan"	Ghazal		
82	"Donon Pe Hai Sadqe Dil-E-Shaida Madina"			
83	"Farza Hai Mehafile"			
84	"Ghir Kar Aayi Badariya Ram"	Kajri		
85	"Hamar Kahin Mano Rajaji"	Thumri		
86	"Hamko Nazar Se Apani"	Ghazal		
87	"Hum Pachatane Sajanaba"	Thumri		
88	"Hum Raunak-e-Hasti Ka"	Ghazal		
89	"Humri Atariya Pe Aao"	Thumri		
90	"Hungama-E-Gham Se"			
91	"Is Darja Bad Guman Se Hum"	Thumri		
92	"Jab Se Shayam Sidhare"	Thumri		
93	"Ja Re Ja Kaaga"	Thumri in Mishra Pahari, Tal Chaanchar		
94	"Kahun Kaise SharamKi Hai Baat"	Dadra Raga Bhihag		
95	"Kal Nahi Aaye"	Thumri in Mishra Bhairavi, Tal Deepchandi		
96	"Kaisi Bansiya Bajai"	Thumri Raga Pilu		
97	"Kaisi Yeh Dhoom Machayi"	Hori Thumri		
98	"Katte Na Birha Ki Raat"	Thumri in Mishra Talang, Tal Chaanchar		
99	"Kaun Kase Sharam Kia Hai Baat"	Dadra : Raga Bihag		
100	"Kaun Tarah Se Tum Khelat Hori Re"	Hori Raga Kafi		
101	"Khoone Dil Ka Jo Kuchh"	Ghazal		
102	"Khudaki Shan Hai"	Ghazal		
103	"Khushi Ne Mujhko Thukraya Hai, Dard O Gham Ne Paala"			
104	"Kya Soje Mohabbat Mein"	Ghazal		
105	"Lagi Beriya Piya Ke Avan Ki"	Thumri		
106	"Main Tere Sang Na"	Pat Manjri		
107	"Main Voh Badnasib Hoon"	Ghazal		
108	"Mat Kar Preet Hum Pacchtaye"	Dadra in Mishra Kafi, Tal Kaharwa		
109	"Mere Jahan Mohabbat Par"	Ghazal		
110	"Mora Balam Pardesiya"	Thumri		
111	"Mori Toot Gai Aas"	Poorvi Dadra		
112	"Muft Huye Badnaam Saanwariya Tere Liye"	Dadra		
113	"Na Ja Balam Pardes"	Raga Mishra Khamaj	Khaiyyam	
114	"Najaraya Kahe Phere Re Balama"			
115	"Nanadiya Kahe Mare"			
116	"Nihur Nihure Balam"	Thumri		
117	"O Bedardi Sapne Mein Aa Ja"	Dadra		
118	"Papiha Dheere Dheere Bol"	Dadra in Mishra Talang, Tal Kaharwa (Sawan)		
119	"Pirai Mori Akhiyan"	Dadra Raga Pilu		
120	"Piya Nahi Aaye"	Thumri in Mishra Gara, Tal Chaanchar		
121	" Sajadon Ka Jabin Par Hai Nisha"	Ghazal (Shaukat Tanvi)		
122	"Sajani Ke Liye Tan Man Dhan"	Geet		
123	"Saqiya Chhod Na Khali"			
124	"Shyam Na Aabtak Aaye"	Dadra		
125	"Sundar Sari Mori"	Traditional		
126	"Sunle Sajani Dilki Baat"	Geet		
127	"Tasveer Ban Gaya Hun"	Ghazal		
128	"Tu Hi Bharosa"			
129	"Tum Jao Jao Jao Mose Na Bolo"	Dadra Raga Khamaj		
130	"Tune Bute Harjai"	Ghazal		
131	"Tum Jao Jao Mose Na Bolo"	Dadra Raga Khamaj		
132	"Unse Jab Tyori Badalkar"			
133	"Usay Kis Taraha Se Sakun Ho"	Ghazal		
134	"Wafa Nahin Na Sahi"	Ghazal		
135	"Wafaon Ke Badle"	Ghazal		
136	"Woh Aa Rahein Hain"	Ghazal		
137	"Yun To Chahe Yahan Saheb"	Ghazal		

=== Bengali ===
No.	Song	Composer	Lyricist	ref
138	"Chupi Chupi Chole Na Giye"	Robi Guha Mazumder	Robi Guha Mazumder	
139	"Jochona Koreche Aari"	Robi Guha Mazumder	Robi Guha Mazumder	
140	"Ei Mousume Paradeshe"	Robi Guha Mazumder	Robi Guha Mazumder	
141	"Koyelia Gaan Thama Ebar"	Jnanprakash Ghosh	Jnanprakash Ghosh	
142	"Phiraye Diyo Na More Shunya Haate"	Jnanprakash Ghosh	Pulak Banerjee	
143	"Phire Ja Phire Ja Bone"	Robi Guha Mazumder	Robi Guha Mazumder	
144	"Phire Keno Ele Na"	Jnanprakash Ghosh	Jnanprakash Ghosh	
145	"Piya Bholo Abhiman"	Jnanprakash Ghosh	Jnanprakash Ghosh	

=== Gujarati ===
No.	Song	Notes	ref
146	"Me Kari Tari"	Ghazal	
147	"Sun Jalun Ke Kooi Ni Jaaho Jalaali Thaaey Chey"	Ghazal	

== Film ==
Key
†	Denotes films that have no record of Begum Akhtar songs

Film	No.	Song	Composer	Lyricist	Director	Notes/ref
Nal O Damyanti (1933) †	1					
Naach Rang (1933) †	2					
Ek Din Ka Badshah (1933)	3	"Woh Asire-Daame-Bala Hoon"	Moti Babu, N. R. Bhattacharya	Shivshankar Shastri	Rajhans	
Ameena (1934) †	4					
Mumtaz Begum (1934) †	5					
Jawani Ka Nasha (1935)	6	"Koyalia Mat Kar Pukar"	Ramzan Khan	Agha Jani Kashmiri	Manjur Ahmad, Nazar Ajimabadi	
Jahanara (1935)	7	"Paayi Fokat Ki Daulat Apni Khul Gayi Kismat"	Master Chhailaram Solanki		F. R. Irani	
Jahanara (1935)	8	"Ae Mere Khaibar Shakan Aka Madda Farmaiye"	Master Chhailaram Solanki			
Naseeb Ka Chakkar (1936)	9	"Kaljug Hai Jabse Aaya Maya Ne Jaal Bichhaya"	Brijlal Verma	Munshi Haider Hussain Lucknowi	Pesi Karani	
Roti (1942)	10	"Phir Faasle Bahar Aayi"	Anil Biswas	Safdar Aah	Mehboob Khan	
Roti (1942)	11	"Char Dinon Ki Jawani"	Anil Biswas	Safdar Aah		
Roti (1942)	12	"Rahne Laga Hai Dil Mein Andhera Tere Bagair"	Anil Biswas	Behzad Lucknowi		
Roti (1942)	13	"Ae Prem Teri Balihari Ho"	Anil Biswas	Safdar Aah		
Roti (1942)	14	"Ulajh Gaye Nainwa"	Anil Biswas	Arzu Lucknavi		
Roti (1942)	15	"Wo Hans Rahe Hain Aah Kiye Ja Raha Hun Main"	Anil Biswas	Arzu Lucknavi		
Panna Dai (1945)	16	"Fasle Gul Aayi Hame Yaad Teri Sataane Lagi"	Gyan Dutt	D. N. Madhok	Ram Daryani	
Panna Dai (1945)	17	"Main Raja Ko Apne Rijha Ke Rahungi"	Gyan Dutt	Diwan Sharar		
Daana Pani (1953)	18	"Ae Ishq Mujhe Aur Toh Kuch"	Mohan Junior	Kaif Irfani	V. M. Vyas	
Ehsan (1954) †	19	"Hamein Dil Mein Basa Lo Yeh Kehte Hain"	Madan Mohan	Kaif Irani	R. Sharma	Unreleased song
Jalsaghar (1956)	20	"Bhar Bhar Aaye"	Vilayat Khan		Satyajit Ray	
