= Zarina Begum =

Indian singer (1930-2018)

- Born: Zarina Shanshah; 1930; Nanpara, United Provinces, British India (present-day Uttar Pradesh, India)
- Origin: Nanpara, Awadh
- Died: 12 May 2018 (aged 87–88) Lucknow, India
- Genres: Ghazal; thumri; dadra
- Occupation: Singer
- Years active: 1941 – 2018

Zarina Begum (1930–2018) was an Indian singer and vocalist from Lucknow, widely regarded as the last of the royal court singers of Awadh. A devoted disciple of the legendary singer Begum Akhtar, she was a master of the baithak-style of classical and semi-classical music, which included genres such as ghazal, thumri, and dadra.

== Early life ==
Zarina Begum was born in Nanpara, a town in the Bahraich district of Uttar Pradesh. Her father, Shanshah Hussain, was a local Qawwal attached to the Nanpara taluqdari estate and was her first singing teacher. As a child, she purchased a harmonium with her savings and secretly practiced singing, imitating the performances of great artists like Begum Akhtar. Recognizing his daughter's talent, her father arranged for her formal training under Ghulam Hazrat of Firangi Mahal. This was later supplemented by a period at the Bhatkhande Music Institute. At the age of 11, she was already undergoing formal musical training and performing in mehfils (private gatherings).

== Career ==
Zarina Begum was a prominent singer in the royal courts of Awadh and Rampur in the 1950s and 1960s. Her performances were characterized by the cultural grace and refinement of Lucknow, and she often sang in purdah. Around the age of 25, Zarina's voice caught the attention of the acclaimed vocalist Begum Akhtar. Begum Akhtar was so impressed that she took Zarina under her guidance and even asked her father for permission to adopt her. With Begum Akhtar's mentorship, Zarina became a prominent court singer, performing at the royal mansions of Lucknow (such as Sultanat Manzil and Sheesh Mehal) and for the Rohilla rulers of Rampur. She became known for her expressive and graceful singing, a style that evoked the refined culture of Lucknow.

Zarina Begum was also trained in classical music and would performed on All India Radio (AIR) in the late 1950s.

Her performances were highly sought after. At one point, the Nawab of Rampur Raza Ali Khan asked her to stay at his manor and live a life of luxury, but she declined, not wanting to give up her daily musical practice. Muzaffar Ali recorded songs with Zarina Begum for his 1996 television series, Husn-e-Jaana.

The Kathak dancer and founder of the Sufi Kathak Foundation, Manjari Chaturvedi, first met Zarina Begum in 1999, when she performed live with Chaturvedi for her "Courtesan Project".

Chaturvedi reconnected with Zarina in 2013, after receiving an application for financial help from the elderly singer. She visited Zarina in her impoverished home and was moved by her living conditions. Despite her paralysis and poor health, Zarina expressed a final wish: "Ek baar Benarasi saree pehen kar gaana hai" ("I want to wear a Banarasi saree and sing once"). In 2014, with the support of the Sufi Kathak Foundation and dancer Manjari Chaturvedi, Zarina performed one last time in Delhi at an event titled "The Last Song of Awadh".

Her voice was renowned for carrying the tehzeeb (grace) and nazakat (delicate refinement) characteristic of Lucknow's cultural identity. Her rendition of the song "Humari Atariya," later featured in the Bollywood film Dedh Ishqiya.

In 2015, the Government of Uttar Pradesh conferred the first Begum Akhtar Award on Zarina Begum, along with a monetary prize of ₹3 lakh.

== Personal life ==
Early in her career, Zarina faced a difficult choice between a secure arranged marriage and her music. She chose her first love and came to be known as "the last song of Avadh". She eventually married her tabla accomplice, Qurban Hussain. The two often performed together. The couple had two sons, Aslam and Ayub, and one daughter, Rubina. After her husband's death, Zarina moved to Lucknow to avoid conflict with his first wife and raised her children on her earnings from mehfils.

Sadly, her personal life was fraught with tragedy. Her elder son, Aslam, moved away and lost touch, while her younger son, Ayub, was mentally challenged and later lost his legs in an accident. Her brother reportedly squandered much of the family's inherited wealth, forcing Zarina to live in a single, dilapidated room in Lucknow's Aminabad neighborhood. Despite being accustomed to a life of luxury and royal patronage, Zarina lived in poverty for the last four decades of her life.

== Death ==
She died in Lucknow in May 12, 2018 at the age of 88.

== Awards and recognition ==
| Year | Award | Category | Result | Title | Ref. |
|---|---|---|---|---|---|
| 2015 | Begum Akhtar Awards | Singer | Won | Arts | |

== Legacy ==
Through her work, Manjari Chaturvedi has also used Zarina Begum's story to highlight the gender disparities in how traditional artists were historically perceived. While male court performers, or ustads, were granted respect, female performers like Zarina were often subjected to social stigma, despite their immense talent. The rediscovery and preservation of her art through projects like Chaturvedi's have sparked a broader interest in documenting and archiving the art of other traditional performers from this era.
