= Gauhar Jaan =

Indian singer and dancer (1873 – 1930)

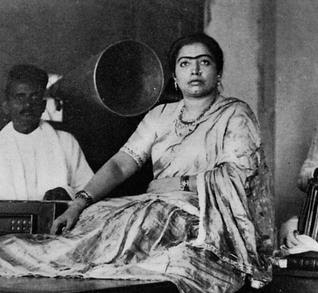
- Born: Angelina Yeoward; 26 June 1873; Azamgarh, United Provinces, British India (Present day Uttar Pradesh, India)
- Died: 17 January 1930 (aged 56); Mysore, Kingdom of Mysore, British India (Present day Karnataka, India)
- Occupations: Musician, dancer
- Years active: 1887–1930
- Mother: Malka Jaan
- Musical career
- Genres: Ghazal, thumri, dadra
- Gauhar Jaan's voice Thumari with "My name is Gauhar Jaan" at the end. Recorded in 1905.

Gauhar Jaan (born Angelina Yeoward; 26 June 1873 – 17 January 1930) was an Indian singer and dancer from Kolkata. Popularly known as the gramophone girl, she was India's first celebrity singer. She was one of the first preferences for audio houses to record music on the then-new 78 rpm record in India c. 1902.

== Early life ==
Gauhar Jaan was born as Eleen Angelina Yeoward on 26 June 1873 in Azamgarh, to a family of Armenian descent. Her father, Robert William Yeoward, worked as an engineer in a dry ice factory, and married her mother, Adeline Victoria Hemmings, in 1872. Victoria herself, was the daughter of Hardy Hemmings, a British soldier and a local Hindu woman named Rukmini in Allahabad and had a sister Vela. Vicky as she was called had been trained in music and dance.

In 1879 the marriage ended, causing hardships to both mother and daughter, who moved to Banaras in 1881, with a Muslim man, 'Khursheed'. Later, Victoria converted to Islam and changed Angelina's name to 'Gauhar Jaan' and hers to 'Malka Jaan'.

== Career ==
In time, Victoria (now Malka Jaan) became an accomplished singer, Kathak dancer and a tawaif in Banaras, and made a name for herself, as Badi Malka Jan; she was called Badi (elder) because at that time three other Malka Jans were famous: Malka Jan of Agra, Malka Jan of Mulk Pukhraj and Malka Jan the Chulbuli, and she was the eldest amongst them.

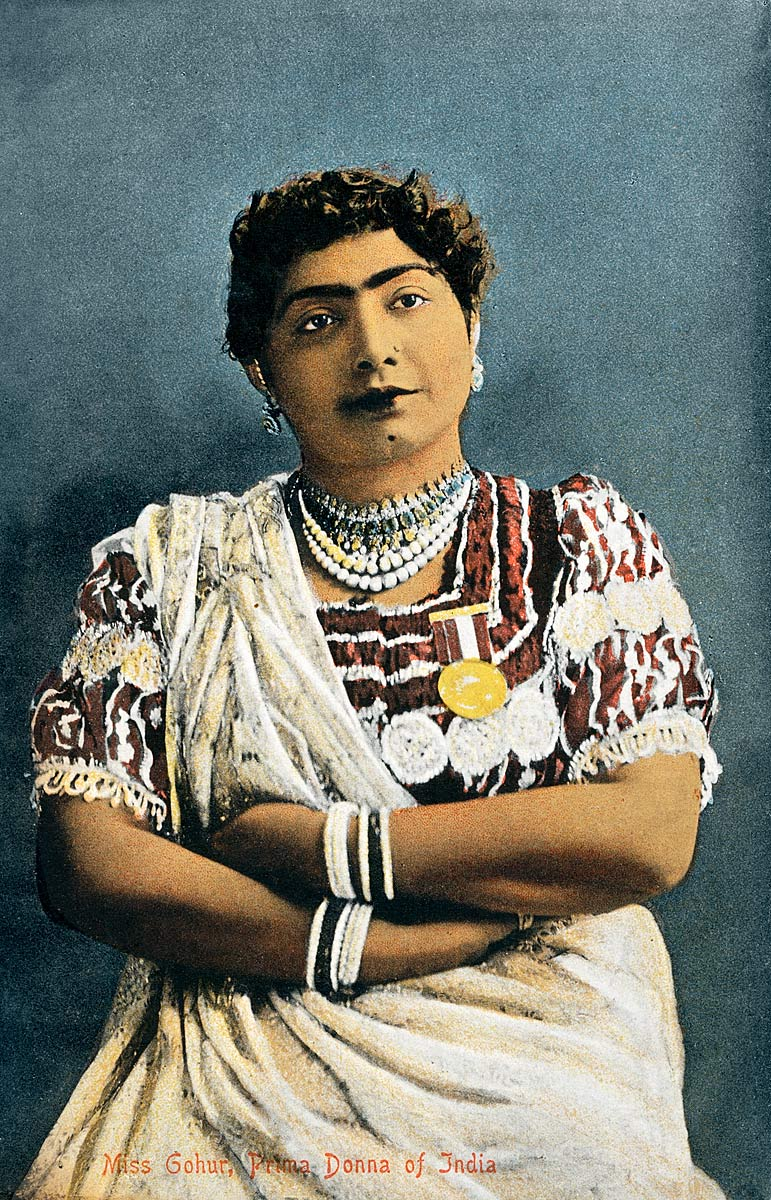
Gauhar Jaan in a 1910 postcard

Malka Jaan moved back to Calcutta in 1883, and established herself in the courts of Nawab Wajid Ali Shah, who had settled at Metiaburj (Garden Reach), near Kolkata and within three years purchased a building at 24 Chit pore Road (now Rabindra Sarani), for Rs. 40,000. It is here that young Gauhar started her training, she learnt pure and light classical Hindustani vocal music from, Kale Khan of Patiala, 'Kalu Ustad', and Ustad Ali Baksh Jarnail (founding members of Patiala Gharana) and Kathak from legendary Brindadin Maharaj (granduncle of Birju Maharaj), Dhrupad dhamar from Srijanbai, and Bengali Keertan from Charan Das. Soon she also started writing and composing ghazals under the pen-name 'Hamdam' and became proficient in Rabindra Sangeet.

Gauhar Jaan gave her maiden performance at the royal courts of Darbhanga Raj in 1888 and was appointed as court musician, after receiving extensive dance and music training from a professional dancer at Banaras. Gauhar Jan started performing in Calcutta in 1896 and was called the 'first dancing girl' in her records. She met Gujarati Parsi theatre artist Amrit Keshav Nayak around 1904–1905 and had a brief relationship with him before his sudden death in 1907. He helped her recover from trauma following death of her mother.

Gauhar Jaan first visited Madras in 1910, for a concert in the Victoria Public Hall, and soon her Hindustani and Urdu songs were published in a Tamil music book. In December 1911, she was famously invited to perform at the coronation of King George V at Delhi Durbar, where she sang a duet, Ye Hai Tajposhi Ka Jalsa, Mubarak Ho Mubarak Ho, with Jankibai of Allahabad.

== Death and legacy ==
Eventually, in her final days, she moved to Mysore, at the invitation of Krishna Raja Wadiyar IV of Mysore, and on 1 August 1928, she was appointed as a 'Palace musician', though she died within 18 months, on 17 January 1930 in Mysore. Towards the end of her life, she was suffering from recurrent bouts of depression and her health was failing her.

In her lifetime, she recorded more than 600 songs from 1902 to 1920, in more than ten languages, including Bengali, Hindustani, Gujarati, Tamil, Marathi, Arabic, Persian, Pushto, French, and English. She would round off her performances for a record by announcing 'My name is Gohar Jan'.

She popularised light Hindustani classical music with her thumri, dadra, kajri, chaiti, bhajan, tarana renditions, and also mastered the technique of condensing performing the elaborate melody Hindustani classical style to just three and a half minutes for a record. Her most famous song are, thumri sung in Bhairavi is Mora nahak laye gavanava, jabse gaye mori sud huna, Ras Ke Bhare Tore Nain, Mere dard-e-jigar and Bhajans like, Radhey Krishna Bol Mukhse.

== Inspiration and honours ==
It is said that Begum Akhtar in her early days wanted to pursue a career in Hindi films, but after listening to the singing of Gauhar and her mother, she gave up the idea completely and devoted herself to learning Hindustani classical music, in fact, her first teacher was Ustad Imdad Khan, who accompanied the mother-daughter duo, Malka Jaan and Gauhar Jaan, on sarangi.

=== Her Birthday Google Doodle ===
On 26 June 2018, Google commemorated Gauhar Jaan with a Doodle on her 145th birth anniversary. Google commented: "Gauhar Jaan, who emerged on the scene at the turn of the 20th century, gained popularity through her singing and dancing, and would go on to define the future of Indian performance art.".

== India's first recording sessions ==
India's first recording sessions included Gauhar Jaan, singing a khayal in Raag Jogiya, recorded by Fred Gaisberg of the Gramophone Company. The sessions began on 8 November 1902. Over the course of six weeks, more than 500 matrices were recorded of local artists. The records were manufactured in Germany and shipped to India in April 1903. They proved a great success in popularising the gramophone in India, where locals had no interest or appreciation for Western music. The recording was done in a makeshift recording studio in two large rooms of a hotel in Kolkata. By 1903, her records started appearing in Indian markets and were in great demand.

== Restoration and release ==
Saregama (formerly the Gramophone Co. of India Ltd, His Master's Voice), is planning to re-release the milestone recordings of Gauhar Jaan, after retrieving them from Gramophone Company's London archives, and restoring them to their original glory.

== Contemporaries ==
There were four singing contemporaries of Gauhar Jaan with first names pronounced the same way as hers and sometimes spelled in English in different ways:

- Gauhar Jan of Patiala;
- Miss Gohar, who was associated with Parsi Theatrical Company in Bombay (Mumbai);

Gohar Kayoum Mamajiwala (also known as Miss Gohar), a singer actress who was associated with and mistress of Sardar Chandulal Shah of Ranjit Films (studio), Bombay; and

- Gohar Bai Karnataka of Bijapur. She is typically associated with Bal Gandharva.

== See also ==
- Tawaif
- Nautch
