= Mubarak Begum (tawaif) =

Indian courtesan (died 1878)

Mubarak Begum (Mahruttun Mubarak ul-Nissa Begum), (died 1878), was an Indian tawaif (courtesan) and thirteenth wife of David Ochterlony, the first British Resident to the Mughal court at Delhi.

== Life ==
Born into a poor family, Mubarak Begum initially pursued a career as a dancing girl in Pune, before converting to Islam. Begum became a tawaif, and had several poetry soirees. Guests included renowned poet Mirza Ghalib. Sir David initially purchased her as a concubine and married her a few years later. Mubarak Begum is said to have held influence in her husband's court.

Reportedly Ochterlony's favourite wife, she was the mother of his two youngest children, both daughters. She was known as "Generallee Begum". As such, she took precedence over the rest of the household.

Begum was a devout Muslim, once applying for leave to make the hajj. She organized musical soirees at their home, maintaining the dignity and decorum of Indian mehfils of music. She also made perfume, and could make attar.

Because of her love for Urdu and Persian poetry, she was a regular participant in the mushairas held in the courtyard of Delhi College. Mughal prince Mirza Farhatullah Baig held a poetry symposium at her home.

Although much younger than Ochterlony, Begum was seen as the dominant personality in the marriage. This led one observer to remark that "making Sir David the Commissioner of Delhi was the same as making Generallee Begum". Another observer remarked, "Ochterlony's mistress is the mistress now of everyone within the walls". As a result of her influence, Ochterlony considered raising his children as Muslims, and when Begum's daughters had grown up, he adopted a child from the family of the Nawabs of Loharu, one of the leading Muslim families of Delhi. Raised by Mubarak, the girl married her cousin, a nephew of the famous Urdu poet Mirza Ghalib.

Begum to have set herself up as a power in her own right, and pursued an independent foreign policy. At one point, it was reported that "Mubarak Begum, alias Generalee Begum, fills the [Delhi] papers with accounts of the Nizars and Khiluts [gifts and dresses of honor] given and taken by her in her transactions with the Vacquils [ambassadors of the different Indian powers] - an extraordinary liberty, if true."

However, despite her power and status, Begum was widely unpopular among the British and the Mughals alike. She offended the British by calling herself "Lady Ochterlony" while also offending the Mughals by awarding herself the title "Qudsia Begum", a title previously reserved for the Emperor's mother. After Ochterlony's death, she inherited Mubarak Bagh, an Anglo-Mughal garden tomb Ochterlony had built in the north of Old Delhi. Her unpopularity combined with her background as a dancing girl ensured that no Mughal gentleman would use her structure. To this date, the tomb is still referred to by the local inhabitants of the old city as the "Randi ki Masjid".

== Masjid ==
David Ochterlony built a mosque in her honour, informally known as Randi ki Masjid. After her death in 1878, the mosque was taken over by the British government. The mosque is one of the three mosques to be commissioned by women in medieval India.
