= Wazeeran =

Indian tawaif

Wazeeran, also known as Nawab Nigar Mahal Sahiba, was an Indian tawaif. She was frequented by Last Nawab of Lucknow, Wajid Ali Shah.

== Life ==
She was the daughter of tawaif, Bibi Jan. She was highly favoured by him, evidenced by the fact that he had conferred her the high title of Malika-e-Alam Nawab Nigar Mahal. He is said to have made her protégé, Ali Naqi Khan, his Wazir (Chief Minister) when he became king.
