= Husna Bai =

Indian Thumri singer

Husna Jan or Husna Bai was a Tawaif and a Thumri singer of Banaras during the late 19th and the early 20th century. She was known in Uttar Pradesh as an expert in khayal, thumri and tappa gayaki. She is credited with redefining and revolutionising the singing tradition in the early 1900s, singing patriotic songs and inspiring other singers to follow suit. She was trained by Thakur Prasad Mishra, and the famous Sarangi player Pandit Shambunath Mishra, and she mastered tappa gayaki under the teaching of the legendary Chote Ramdas Ji of Banaras.

== Career ==
Bai was a contemporary of Bhartendu Harishchandra, and corresponded with him and took his advice and opinion on poetic expression. Her thumri and other subgenres of thumri were published as Madhu Tarang (Sharma, 2012). Harishchandra also got her to compose Geet Govind by Jaidev. She was considered in the same league as Vidyabari and Badi Moti Bai, masters of the art of thumri and tappa. Bai was referred to as ‘Sarkar’ or chieftain, as she rose to great heights in her career.

== Political involvement ==
When M.K.Gandhi traveled through Kashi(a particular neighborhood in modern-day Varanasi.) and Nainital during the Non-Cooperation movement (1920–22), Bai galvanised a movement in which she had an influence in persuading female singers to earn a living by singing Bhajans and patriotic songs instead. This was also aimed at raising the dignity of these singers, whose work was frequently equated to sex work as a profession. Many of these singers joined the charkha movement subsequently. With the followers of Gandhi picketing outside the homes of sex workers in Amristar and public opinion appearing to turn against Tawaif’s and those professions perceived in similar fashion to a perception of sex work. Bai formed the ‘Tawaif Sabha’(courtesan federation of Kashi) with two objectives of supporting the national movement and reforming the lives of Tawaifs. Bai’s presidential speech at the inauguration of the Sabha is available in Varvadhu Vivechan, (Sahitya Sadan, Amritsar, 1929) She recited a nationalist poem.

Bai exhorted fellow Tawaifs to learn from the life of Joan of Arc and the women of Chittorgarh, wear iron shackles instead of gold ornaments, and stay away from a life not honourable. As Tawaifs could not change their profession entirely Bai advised them to begin their recitals with nationalist or patriotic compositions. She advised the Tawaifs to collect these songs from Vidhyadhari Bai, another famous Tawaif singer of Banaras. Bai saw this as a step towards achieving social status and dignity for Tawaifs. With other Tawaifs she participated in the boycott of non-Indian goods and embraced the Swadeshi movement.
