= Manjari Chaturvedi =

Indian Kathak dancer

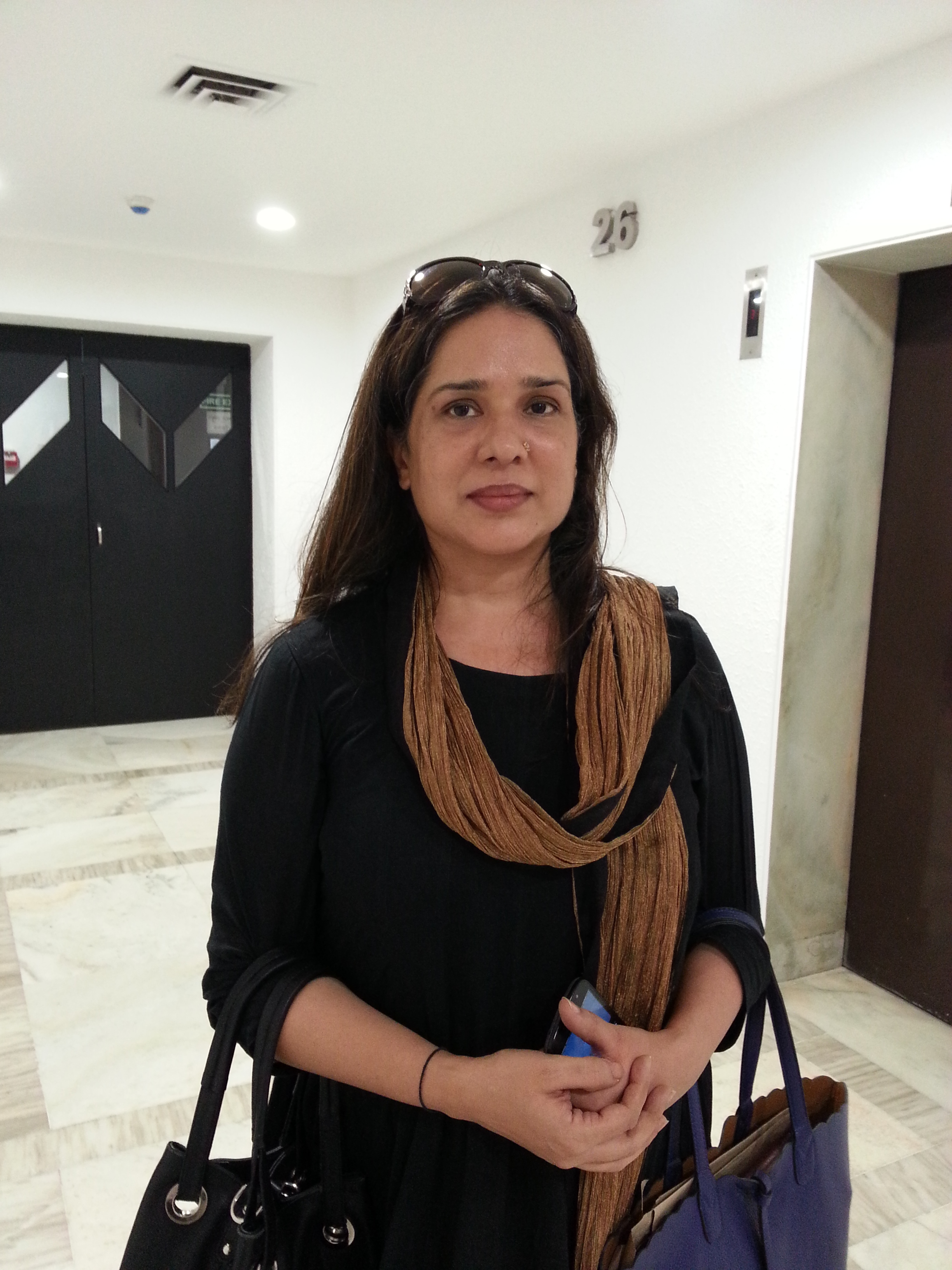
- Manjari Chaturvedi

Background information
- Born: Uttar Pradesh
- Origin: India
- Genres: Indian classical music, Kathak
- Occupation: Classical dancer
- Website: http://www.sufikathakfoundation.com/

Manjari Chaturvedi is an Indian Kathak dancer. She belongs to the Lucknow Gharana.

== Early life and background ==
Manjari Chaturvedi was born in a well established family of Lucknow. Her grandfather, Justice Hari Shankar Chaturvedi, was a High Court Judge at The Lucknow bench. Her father, Prof. Ravi Shankar Chaturvedi, was a Geologist and a Geophysics professor at the IIT Roorkee, and a respected Space Scientist who established the Remote Sensing Applications Centre at Lucknow and a visionary in the field of Science & Technology for Rural Development. Her mother Sudha Chaturvedi is a strong, resilient, well read woman who instilled strong values in her children. Manjari spent her early formative years in Lucknow and it is this city that has impacted her work the most. She did her schooling from Carmel Convent and Hoerner School and her higher studies from Lucknow University. She did her Masters (M.Sc.) In Environmental Sciences from the Lucknow University. She trained in the professional category of Kathak Dance at the Kathak Kendra under the UP Sangeet Natak Academy .

She trained initially in the Lucknow gharana of kathak under the guidance of Arjun Mishra. She also studied abhinaya under Kalanidhi Narayan at Protima Bedi’s Nrityagram. She closely studied Baba Bulleh Shah’s contribution to Punjabi Sufi traditions. Mawlana Rumi and Amir Khusro also influenced her.

== Career ==
Chaturvedi began her career as a Kathak dancer. She attempts at building an interface with diverse forms like the music of Rajasthan, Kashmir, Awadh, Punjab, Turkmenistan, Iran and Krygistan. She is particularly drawn to Sufi mysticism and has endeavoured to incorporate movements in her performances that are reminiscent of the meditative practices of the whirling dervishes. She has therefore, chosen to name her dance style as Sufi Kathak.

She performed at the Taj Mahal and Sydney Opera House.

She did a Sufi music video directed by Vishal Bhardwaj and written by Gulzar called as Tere Ishq Mein.

She has performed in more than 300 concerts in more than 22 countries across the world. In the last two decades, Manjari has performed concerts all over the world including Europe (France, Germany, Portugal, Italy, Austria, Switzerland, U.K. & Ireland), Armenia, Georgia, the Middle East (Dubai, Bahrain, Abu Dhabi, Qatar, Kuwait), South East Asia (Singapore, Malaysia, Sri Lanka) and Central Asia (Turkmenistan, Kyrgyzstan, Uzbekistan, Tajikistan) along with Australia and America.

=== Significant Venues ===
- India International Centre
- Kalaghoda, Mumbai
- Tagore Auditorium, Chandigarh
- Chowmahalla Palace, Hyderabad
- Aravali Bio Diversity Park, Gurgaon
- Jumeirah Beach Hotel, Dubai
- Indira Gandhi National Centre for Arts, New Delhi
- Symphony Space, New York City
- Judith Wright Centre for Performing Arts – Brisbane
- Smithsonian Museum, Washington DC
- Royal Festival Hall, South Bank Centre, London, UK
- Sydney Opera House, Australia
- National Gallery of Victoria, Australia
- Rashtrapati Bhawan
- Parliament House
- Medinat Jumeirah
- Purana Quila
- Jagmandir Palace, Udaipur
- Lake Palace, Udaipur
- Aman-E-Bagh
- Ram Bagh Palace, Jaipur
- Lotus Temple, New Delhi
- Town Hall, Kolkata
- Qutb Minar, New Delhi
- Murshidabad Palace, Murshidabad
- Neemrana Fort
- Devigarh Fort
- Qila Mubarak, Patiala
- Jagatjit Palace, Kapurthala
- Khajuraho Temple
- Janana Mahal, Udaipur
- Amber Fort, Jaipur
- Fatehpur Sikri
- Arab Ki Sarai, Humayun’s Tomb
- Holkar Palace, Maheshwar
- Taj Mahal, Agra
- Dilkusha Palace, Lucknow

=== Dance of Mystics ===
She has been the part of the Sufi Symposium at the prestigious Smithsonian Museum Washington D.C. and of the conference on Living heritage by UNESCO and is the Jury and member of "Think Tank on Asian dance" for the prestigious Asian Dance Committee in Korea. In the past decade Manjari Chaturvedi has collaborated and performed with a wide range of international artists as Global Fusion with Tim Ries (Saxophone, Rolling Stones, USA) And Ustad Shujaat Hussain Khan (Sitar, India), Taufiq Quereshi (India), Kailash Kher (India), Kevin Hays (Piano, USA), Dhaffer Yoseuf (Oudh, Vocals, Tunisia), Rahim Al Hajj ( Oudh, Iraq), Patrick Possey (Saxophone, USA), Firas Shahrstan (Qanun, Syria), Micheal Glenn (Bass, USA).

SHORT FILMS AND VIDEOS She did a Sufi music video directed by Vishal Bhardwaj and written by Gulzar called as Tere Ishq Mein. She has performed in ZARA THAHER JAAO: a Dance sequence on music by Ustad Amjad Ali Khan She has performed in JASHN-E-AWADH: An audio visual for the Taj Group of Hotels She has performed in SOULFUL STRINGS OF SARANGI: A film by Pamela Rooks She has performed in HISTORICAL JOURNEY OF TAJ HOTELS, RESORTS & PALACES: A film directed by Zafar Hai She has performed in AMIR KHUSRAU: A film for National Television directed by Muzaffar Ali She has performed in RAQS-E-DIL: A film for National Television by Muzaffar Ali She has performed in RUMI IN THE LAND OF KHUSRAU: A film on the Sufi traditions across the world She has done dance direction and choreography in HUSN-E-JAANA a television serial by Muzaffar Ali She has performed in THE LEGACY OF AN ERA: A film on Lucknow by Mazhar Kamran.

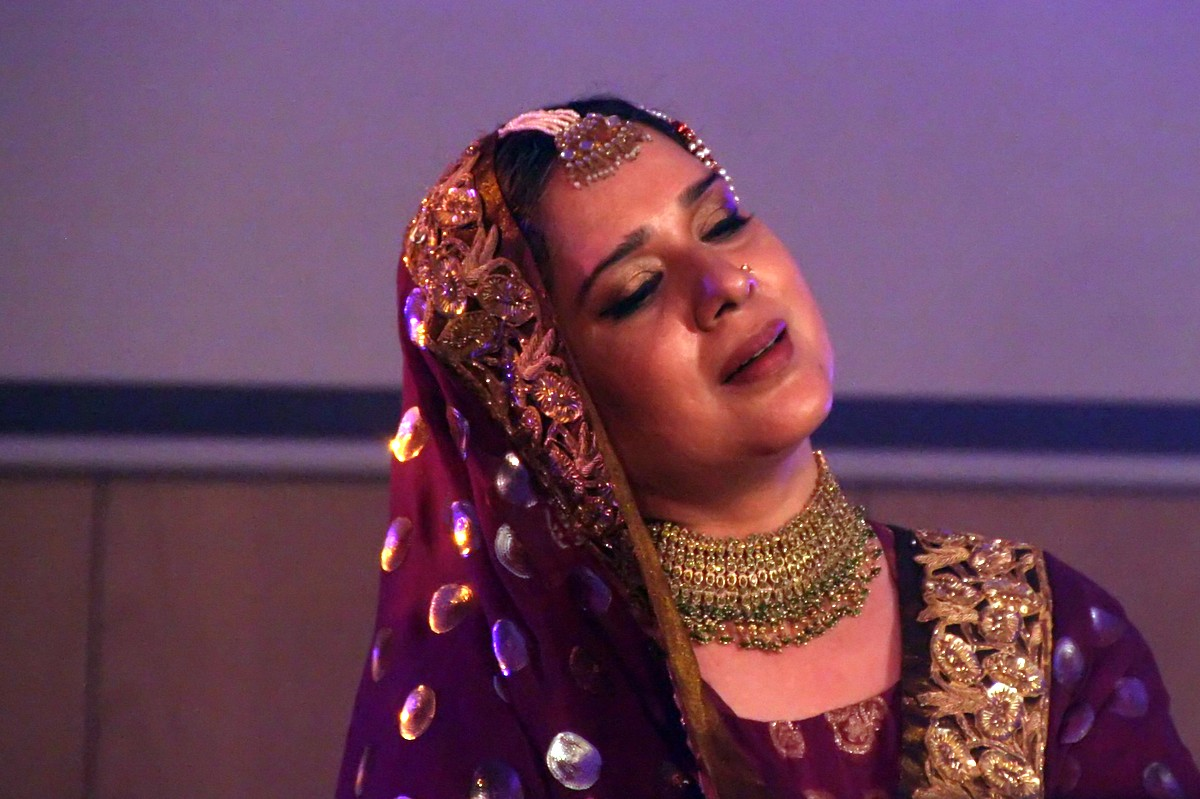
:Manjari Chaturvedi performing in Lost Song of Awadh in Delhi

=== The Courtesan Project ===
Founded by Manjari Chaturvedi, The Courtesan Project seeks to address social stigmas associated with courtesans (tawaifs). The initiative focuses on recognizing these performers as artists and includes 'The Lost Songs and Dance of Courtesans,' a project dedicated to archiving and documenting their history and performances.

To her own volition, Manjari undertook a new initiative wherein her dance form brought together both dance and stories of women who were stigmatized by the Indian society for being performers in royal courts. In the times of Medieval India and Mughal India, the social structure was ridden by gender discrimination which led to Indian women not being properly documented in performing arts. Such improper research and documentation causes myths and misconceptions about the lives and history of courtesans. Therefore, the project intends to remove gender and historical bias so one can respect the women as artists.

Today, it is not uncommon to have the words ‘courtesan’ and ‘prostitute’ being used inter-changeably. This is the greatest error that has been continually done. In an extremely unfair record of history based on gender inequality, the men pursuing these arts are revered as "Ustads" (Masters) while the women pursuing the same arts became "Nautch Girls" (Dancing Girls). The current generations of erstwhile male court dancers talk about family lineage with a sense of pride extolling the greatness of their forefathers as dancers in royal courts. At the same time, the generations of women court dancers live with a sense of shame never disclosing their lineage or any connection with erstwhile courts. Gender discrimination in the field of arts has never been addressed and today this sect of women are ostracised in the society and considered "lesser" than their contemporary men.

Manjari says, "It is the need of the hour to question and challenge the "disregard" towards these women artists and their traditions. We must think about this as a collective society and a project like this helps to shape up the collective conscience of the society."

== Controversy ==
=== Qawwali Performance Interrupted ===
On 17 January 2020, Manjari Chaturvedi claimed that her qawwali performance was “deliberately” stopped midway by officials of the Uttar Pradesh government during an official cultural programme at a private hotel in Lucknow. However, the Department of Culture, Uttar Pradesh, denied the accusation.

== See also ==
- List of Kathak dancers
