= Lahore: A Sentimental Journey =

1993 novel by Pran Nevile

Lahore - A sentimental Journey
- Author: Pran Nevile
- Language: English
- Genre: Art Coffee table book
- Publisher: Nevile Books
- Publication date: 1993
- Publication place: India
- Media type: Print (Softcover)
- ISBN: 0-14-306197-6
- OCLC: 71627437

Lahore - A sentimental Journey is a novel by Indian author Pran Nevile in which he recollects his pre-partition days in Lahore. Published in 1993 by Penguin Book India. The author takes us back in the 1930s and 40s right into the heart of Lahore. The story is set against the time before the partition, between India and Pakistan, from the fall of brotherhood between the two nations through the invasion of British Empire.

== Summary ==
The book, sentimental Journey of Lahore reminds people of what Lahore was really like before the partition, the way Hindus, Sikhs and Muslims lived ensemble. He gives the reader a taste of what Lahore is really like. His book reminisces his childhood memories and gives an opportunity to the reader to see Lahore through the author’s eyes. Pran Nevile further explains how things became inevitable due to the conflict that was created by the British Empire. The book covers all aspects of Lahore from its rich culture, Mughal architecture, to warm welcoming people. His whole purpose was to remind people about the city of Lahore and revive the love he has in others' hearts. Nevile being a diplomat apprised in different countries the rich and exotic culture of Lahore. As the author says “I have travelled around the world but there is not a city like Lahore, the adage "Lahore Lahore hay" perfectly describes it ‘’ Pran Nevile.

== The Author ==
Pran Nevile (born October 22, 1922) is an Indian author of Art, Culture & History renowned for the 1992 book, Lahore - A Sentimental Journey. Nevile‘s birthplace was Lahore and he completed his degree from the Government College of Lahore. He worked for the Indian Foreign Service and the United Nations. Due to his work, he got the privilege to work in Japan, Poland and Yugoslavia, former USSR and USA. He has also worked as the Director of the State Trading Corporation, Program Co-coordinator with the United Nations Conference on Trade and Development in Geneva looking after East Europe and in-charge of 7 countries in East Europe He retired as a Consul General of India in Chicago. After retirement, he turned into a writer and is an expert in the study of Indian art and culture. The first academic piece of writing the author published. Prem Nevile had mainly written on Indian art, culture and he was an advisor for two BBC film son the Raj. He has also written books like Raj, Nautch Girls of India, Beyond the Veil, Rare Glimpses of the Raj, Stories from the Raj: Sahibs, Memsahibs and Others, and K.L. Saigal: Immortal Singer. He visited Lahore after such a long time was because “There was a reason for that. I didn’t want to disturb my images and memories of this city before my book was completed.’’ "My friend (the late) Khalid Hasan used to call me 'Chalta Phirta Lahore', like people used to call 'Manto Chalta Phirta Bombay'," he said. [6]

== See also ==
- Lahore
- Punjab
- Indian literature
