= Journal of Advances in Management Research =

- Discipline: Management studies
- Language: English
- Edited by: Ravi Shankar

Publication details
- History: 2003–present
- Publisher: Emerald Group Publishing
- Frequency: 5/year
- Open access: Hybrid
- Impact factor: 2.6 (2023)

Standard abbreviations
- ISO 4: J. Adv. Manag. Res.

Indexing
- ISSN: 0972-7981 (print); 2049-3207 (web)
- LCCN: 2017205802
- OCLC no.: 502282653

Links
- Journal homepage; Online archive

The Journal of Advances in Management Research is a peer-reviewed academic journal covering research in all functional areas of management, both in the service and manufacturing sectors. It is published by Emerald Group Publishing in collaboration with the Indian Institute of Technology, Delhi.

== Abstracting and indexing ==
The journal is abstracted and indexed in:

- Directory of Open Access Journals
- Emerging Sources Citation Index
- ProQuest databases
- Scopus

According to the Journal Citation Reports, the journal has a 2023 impact factor of 2.6.
