= Nautch Girls of India =

1996 coffee table book by Pran Nevile

Nautch Girls of India: Dancers, Singers, Playmates
- Author: Pran Nevile
- Language: English
- Genre: Art Coffee table book
- Publisher: Nevile Books
- Publication date: 1996
- Publication place: India
- Media type: Print (Hardcover)
- ISBN: 978-81-900688-0-2
- OCLC: 38528231
- LC Class: GV1693 .N48 1996

Nautch Girls of India: Dancers, Singers, Playmates is a 1996 coffee table book by Pran Nevile, based on the lives of nautch girls.

== Contents ==
- From Apsara to the Nautch Girls
- Sahibs as Patrons and Spectators
- Rhythms and Melodies; Customs and Manners
- Famous Nautch Girls
- Sex and the Nautch Girls
- Farewell to the Nautch Girl
- Epilogue
- Afterword : The Dance Foot - by Mulk Raj Anand.
