= Ravi Shankar (academic) =

Indian academic

Ravi Shankar is an Indian academic who is professor of operations and supply chain management at Indian Institute of Technology, Delhi. He is Fellow of Indian National Academy of Engineering (FNAE). His research citations exceed 37,000 with an H-index of 82 as of September 2023.

== Awards and honours ==
- On March 20, 2018, the Education Minister of India bestowed upon Shankar an "Outstanding Faculty Award" in the domain of Business, Management, and Accounting. This recognition was awarded for his exceptional contributions during the period spanning 2015 to 2017, further highlighting his significant impact in the field.
- Shankar appeared in the 2022 list of Elsevier's Top 2% list Indian Productive Researchers in the business and management category on a single year basis.
- The 2nd Edition of Research.com (November 2022) ranked Shankar as the best (1st) scientist (researcher) in India and 101st best globally in the arena of Business and Management based on the basis of data consolidated from various data sources including OpenAlex and CrossRef.
- Shankar serves as Editor-in-Chief of Journal of Advances in Management Research published by Emerald Publishing.

== Career ==
Shankar is the Amar Gupta Chair Professor of Decision Science. His teaching and research focus primarily on the domain of Operations & Supply Chain Management and Decision Sciences.

== See also ==
- Ravi Shankar on Google Scholar
