= Malka Jaan =

Indian singer and dancer (1855 – 1907)

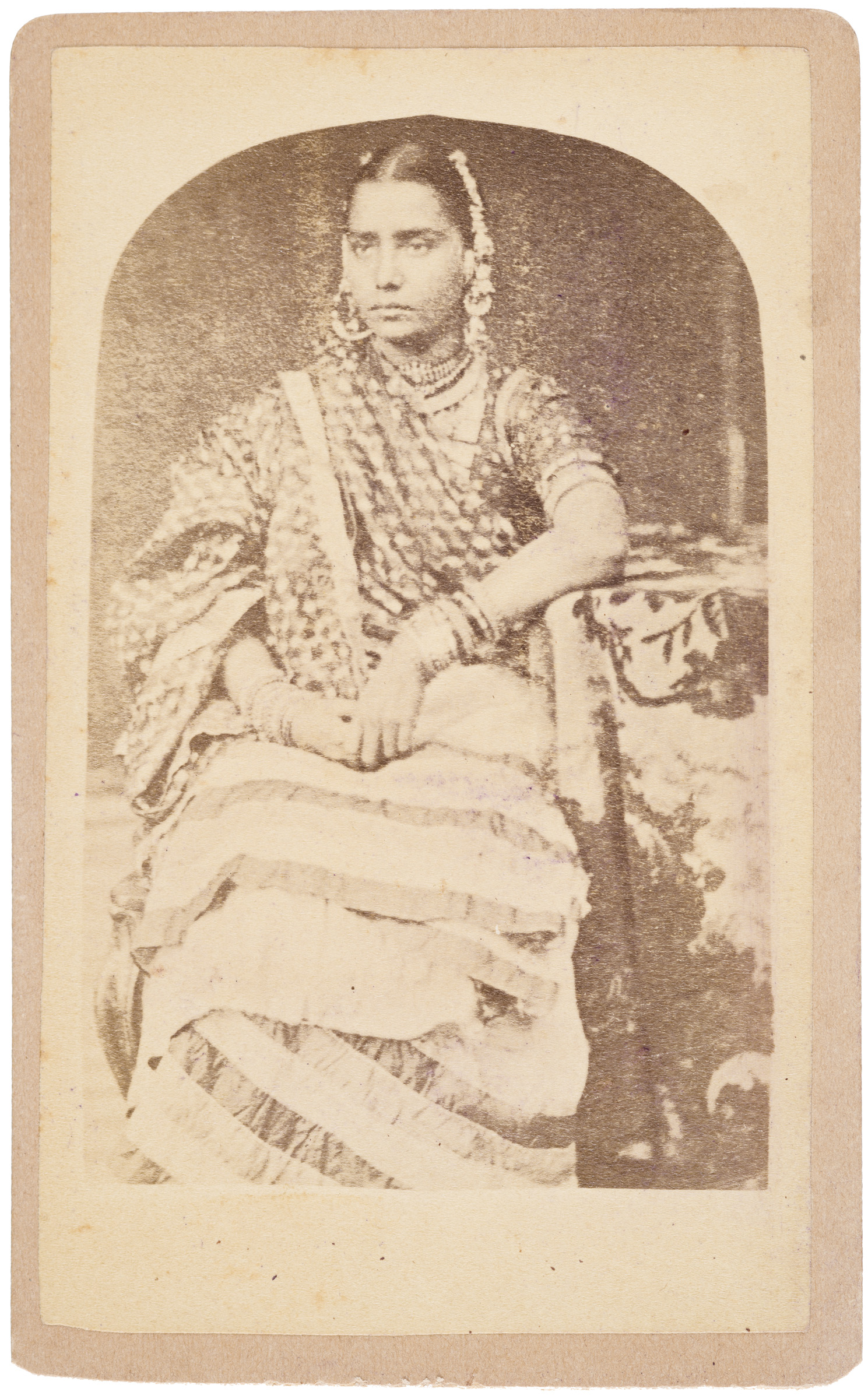
- Malka Jaan, c. 1875
- Born: Adeline Victoria Hemmings; 1855; Allahabad, United Provinces, British India (Present day Prayagraj, India)
- Died: 1907 (aged 51–52); Calcutta, British India (Present day Kolkata, India)
- Occupations: Musician, dancer
- Years active: 1883–1907
- Spouse: Robert William Yeoward (m. 1872; div. 1879)
- Partner: Khursheed (1881-1883)
- Children: Gauhar Jaan
- Musical career
- Genres: Ghazal, thumri, dadra

Malka Jaan (born: Adeline Victoria Hemmings; 1855 – 1907) was an Indian courtesan (tawaif), singer, poet and Kathak dancer who was active in the late 19th and early 20th centuries. She was known as Malka Jaan of Calcutta and Malka Jaan of Benaras. She was a prominent figure in the cultural life of Banaras and later Calcutta, and is best known as the mother and early musical guru of Gauhar Jaan, a pioneering recording artist of India.

== Early life ==
Malka Jaan was born Adeline Victoria Hemmings, the daughter of a British soldier and a local Hindu woman named Rukmini. She was born in Allahabad, and since childhood she was a talented singer and dancer from a young age.

== Career ==
In 1881, after her divorce, Hemmings and her daughter moved to Banaras and Hemmings adopted the name Malka Jaan. Already trained in music and dance, she became a well-regarded courtesan in the city. To distinguish herself from other popular performers with the same name, she was known as "Badi" (elder) Malka Jaan.

Malka Jaan relocated to Calcutta in 1883 and quickly established herself in the court of Nawab Wajid Ali Shah at Matiaburj. Malka Jaan became one of the city's most celebrated performers between the 1870s and 1890s. Within three years, she had purchased a building at 24 Chitpore Road (now Rabindra Sarani), which became a cultural hub for music and poetry. She was a noted poet (Sahib-e Divan poet) and published a collection of Urdu poems titled Makhzan-e-Ulfat-e-Malka Jan.

== Personal life ==
At the age of 15, she met Robert William Yeoward, an engineer of Armenian descent, whom she married in 1872. The couple had a daughter, Eileen Angelina Yeoward, born in Azamgarh in 1873; the marriage ended in 1879.

After her divorce she met Khurshid. Malka then converted to Islam and legally changed her name from Adeline Victoria Hemmings to Malka Jaan. She also converted her daughter and changed her name from Eileen Angelina Yeoward to Gauhar Jaan. She remained as a practicing and devout Muslim for the rest of her life.

== Death ==
Malka Jaan died around 1907. Her death was a significant turning point in her daughter's life.

== Contemporaries ==
There were four singing contemporaries of Malka Jaan with first names pronounced the same way as hers and sometimes spelled in English in different ways. The name Malka Jaan was common among courtesans (tawaif) in the late 19th and early 20th centuries, and there were several prominent singers with this name. The title "Badi" (elder) was prefixed to her name to distinguish her from other contemporary performers who shared the name Malka Jaan. The most famous Malka Jaans of that era were:

- Malka Jaan of Agra a contemporary of Gauhar Jaan, she was renowned for her powerful, full-throated style of thumri singing. She recorded for the Gramophone Company and was a court musician for Nawab Wajid Ali Shah.
- Malka Jaan of Mulk Pukhraj another famous courtesan and singer of the time
- Malka Jaan of Chulbuli a nautch girl who also left recorded discs.
- Malka Jaan of Gaya a performer who also made recordings.

== Inspiration and honours ==
Begum Akhtar in her early days wanted to pursue a career in Hindi films, but after listening to the singing of Malka Jaan and her daughter Gauhar Jaan, she gave up the idea completely and devoted herself to learning Hindustani classical music, in fact, her first teacher was Ustad Imdad Khan, who accompanied the mother-daughter duo, Malka Jaan and Gauhar Jaan, on sarangi.

== Legacy ==
She is remembered for her contributions to Urdu poetry and as an accomplished performer in her own right. Her voice was recorded by The Gramophone Company, and her mansion was a celebrated cultural salon. Beyond her musical talents, Badi Malka Jaan was also a poet who wrote in Urdu. Her collection of verses, Makhzan-e-ulfat-e-Malka, has been rediscovered and published. She mentored her daughter, Gauhar Jaan, who would go on to become a national icon and India's first recording superstar.

== In popular culture ==
- In 2019, My name is Gauhar Jaan, a theatre play based on her and her daughter Gauhar Jaan's life in which the role of Malka Jaan was portrayed by Neena Kulkarni.
- In 2024, Heeramandi an Indian Hindi-language period drama television series created and directed by Sanjay Leela Bhansali, Manisha Koirala essayed a role of her namesake called Mallika Jaan.
