= Roti (1942 film) =

1942 film

- Film poster
- Directed by: Mehboob Khan
- Written by: R. S. Chawdhary
- Screenplay by: Vajahat Mirza
- Starring: Chandramohan; Sheikh Mukhtar; Sitara Devi; Akhtaribai Faizabadi; Ashraf Khan
- Narrated by: S. Pellokila
- Cinematography: Faredoon A. Irani
- Edited by: Shamsudin Kadri
- Music by: Anil Biswas
- Production company: Sagar National Studios Ltd.
- Release date: 1942
- Running time: 128 minutes
- Country: India
- Language: Hindi

Roti (1942)

Roti (transl. Chappati or Flatbread) is a 1942 Indian Hindi film directed by Mehboob Khan.

The film, which featured anti-capitalist themes, tells a poignant and critical story about the clash between two vastly different socio-economic systems: the rampant greed and individualism of modern, capitalist society, and the simple, communal life of a primitive jungle tribe.

This was Mehboob Khan's last movie before he set up his own production house. The cast included Chandramohan, Sheikh Mukhtar, Sitara, Akhtaribai Faizabadi and Ashraf Khan.

== Plot ==
The film opens with a powerful montage depicting the stark realities of poverty and wealth, where roti (bread), a basic necessity, is fought over by the starving poor while the rich indulge in excess. This sets the stage for the film’s central themes.

The plot primarily revolves around Laxmidas (Chandramohan), a wealthy and avaricious millionaire. Driven by an insatiable hunger for money and power, he embodies the corrupting influence of capitalism. His journey takes an unexpected turn when his airplane crashes in a remote jungle.

He is rescued by a tribal community led by the noble Balam (Sheikh Mukhtar) and his companion Kinari (Sitara Devi). This tribe lives by principles of "primitive communism," sharing resources equally and placing no value on gold, which they perceive as the root of all evil. Their existence is harmonious and connected to nature, forming a stark contrast to the world from which Laxmidas hails.

While recovering, Laxmidas observes their way of life. Despite being initially helped, his inherent greed eventually leads him to exploit them. He steals their buffaloes, Changu and Mangu, and makes his way back to the city, intent on resuming his pursuit of wealth.

In his innocent and simplistic manner, Balam, accompanied by Kinari, follows Laxmidas to the city to recover his animals. However, they are quickly confronted by the harsh realities of urban life, where everything has a price and money dictates social standing. They find themselves exploited, humiliated, and unable to comprehend the materialistic values of the city. Balam, a dignified tribesman, is forced into degrading work in a cotton mill, highlighting the dehumanising aspects of industrial labour. His disillusionment deepens as he witnesses the city's moral decay and the suffering it inflicts.

Meanwhile, Laxmidas continues his relentless pursuit of wealth, resorting to increasingly ruthless methods, including murder and deceit. He ruins other wealthy men, hoards grain, and crushes striking workers, demonstrating the destructive power of unchecked greed. Darling (Akhtaribai Faizabadi), initially drawn to Laxmidas, witnesses his villainy firsthand.

The film's climax sees Laxmidas fleeing the city with his ill-gotten gold, accompanied by Darling. However, in a twist of fate, they become stranded in the desert. In a deeply symbolic scene, they encounter Balam and Kinari, who offer them water. Laxmidas, consumed by pride and a refusal to be indebted to those he despises, rejects their help, choosing to die of thirst rather than accept charity from the "primitive" people he once scorned.

The tribal couple, disillusioned by the city’s corruption, ultimately return to their simple, communal life in the jungle, finding peace and fulfilment away from the material world. Laxmidas and Darling perish in the desert, surrounded by their worthless gold, signifying the ultimate futility of material wealth when detached from human connection and morality.

== Cast ==
- Chandramohan
- Sheikh Mukhtar
- Jamshedji
- Sitara Devi
- Akhtaribai Faizabadi
- Nawab
- Agha Jani Kashmiri

== Soundtrack ==
The film's soundtrack was composed by Anil Biswas with lyrics penned by Safdar Aah. Anil Biswas introduced Begum Akhtar as a singer in this movie.

Track#	Song	Singer(s)
1	"Chaar Dinon Ki Jawaani"	Akhtaribai Faizabadi
2	"Garibo Par Daya Kar Ke"	Ashraf Khan
3	"Phir Faasle Bahaar Aayi"	Akhtaribai Faizabadi
4	"Ulajh Gae Nainawaa"	Akhtaribai Faizabadi
