= Pran Nevile =

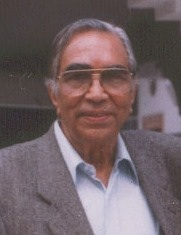
- Born: 1922; Lahore
- Died: October 11, 2018 (aged 95); New Delhi
- Occupation: Author-Scholar
- Genre: Art, Culture & History

Website
- www.prannevileofficial.com

Pran Nevile (1922 – October 11, 2018) was an Indian author of Indian Art, Indian Culture & Indian History best known for the 1992 book, Lahore: A Sentimental Journey. He was an authority on pre-1947 Lahore and Nautch.

== Biography ==
Nevile was born in 1922 in Lahore and took his post graduate degree from Government College Lahore. He had a distinguished career in the Indian Foreign Service and the United Nations. During his tenure he was posted in Japan, Poland and Yugoslavia, former USSR and USA. He was also Director of the State Trading Corporation; and in-charge of 7 countries in East Europe. His last posting was Consul General of India in Chicago. He also had a 6-year tenure as Program Co-ordinator with the United Nations Conference on Trade and Development in Geneva looking after East Europe. His specialization has been in trade with Comecon countries that include East Europe and former USSR. After retirement, he turned a freelance writer and specialized in the study of Indian art and culture.

== Author and scholar ==
His particular fascination with the performing arts inspired him to spend nearly seven years researching in the libraries and museums of England and the US to enable him to produce the sumptuously illustrated 'Nautch Girls of India' in 1996. Highly acclaimed by the media it was considered to be a pioneering work on the subject of dance and music as well as their practitioners through the centuries. Nevile has written extensively for Indian newspapers and journals. He was the author of other well known books such as 'Lahore - A Sentimental Journey', 'Love Stories from the Raj', 'Rare Glimpses of the Raj', 'Beyond the Veil - Indian Women in the Raj', 'Stories from the Raj - Sahibs,' Memsahibs and others', K.L. Saigal - Immortal singer and superstar and lastly 'Marvels of Indian Painting - Rise and Demise of Company School'.

Nevile had been invited by several institutions in India and also universities in England and U.S.A. to speak on themes related to Indian art and culture. He also acted as a consultant for two BBC documentaries on the Raj viz. 'Ruling Passions' and 'The Land of Kamasutra'.

== KL Saigal Memorial Circle ==
Nevile was the founder and convener of the KL Saigal Memorial Circle, which is dedicated to remembering singers of yesteryears.

== Death ==
Nevile died in New Delhi on October 11, 2018, at the age of 95.

== Books ==
- Sahibs' India: Vignettes from the Raj, Penguin Books (2010)
- Marvels of Indian Painting: Rise and Demise of Company School, Nevile Books (2007)
- KL Saigal - Immortal Singer and Superstar, Nevile Books (2006)
- Beyond the Veil - Indian Women in the Raj, Nevile Books (2005)
- Stories from the Raj - Sahibs, Memsahibs and Others, Nevile Books (2004)
- Rare Glimpses of the Raj, Somaiya (1998)
- Nautch Girls of India: Dancers, Singers, Playmates, Ravi Kumar Publisher (1996)
- Love Stories from the Raj, Penguin (1994)
- Lahore - A sentimental Journey, Allied Publishers (1992)
- The Raj Revisited, Niyogi Books.
