= Begum Akhtar =

Indian singer and actress (1914-1974)

- Screen shot as "Akhtari Fyzabadi" from film Roti (1942)

Background information
- Born: Akhtaribai Faizabadi; 7 October 1914; Faizabad, United Provinces, British India (present-day Uttar Pradesh, India)
- Origin: Faizabad, Awadh
- Died: 30 October 1974 (aged 60) Ahmedabad, Gujarat, India
- Genres: Ghazal; thumri; dadra
- Occupation: Singer
- Years active: 1929 – 1974

Akhtari Bai Faizabadi (7 October 1914 – 30 October 1974), also known as Begum Akhtar, was an Indian singer and actress. Dubbed "Mallika-e-Ghazal" (Queen of Ghazals), she is regarded as one of the greatest singers of ghazal, dadra, and thumri genres of Hindustani classical music.

Begum Akhtar received the Sangeet Natak Akademi Award for vocal music in 1972, was awarded Padma Shri, and later a Padma Bhushan Award posthumously by the government of India.

== Early life ==
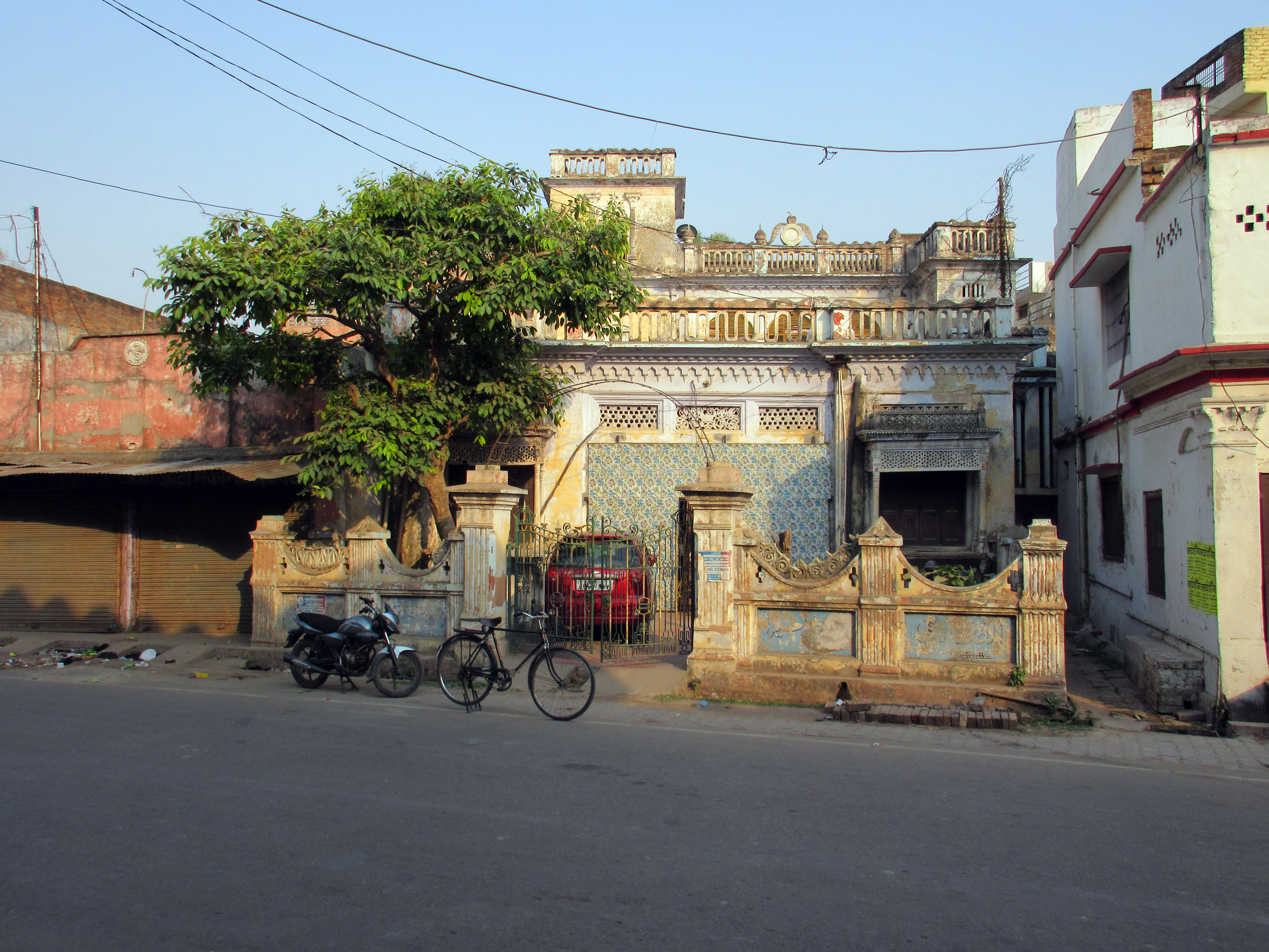
Begum Akhtar's ancestral home in Faizabad

Akhtari Bai Faizabadi was born on 7 October 1914 to Asghar Hussain, a lawyer and his second wife Mushtari. Asghar Hussain subsequently disowned Mushtari and his twin daughters Zohra and Bibbi (later known as Begum Akhtar).

== Career ==
Akhtar was barely seven when she was captivated by the music of Chandra Bai, an artist attached to a touring theatre group. However at her uncle's insistence she was sent to train under Ustad Imdad Khan, the great sarangi exponent from Patna, and later under Ata Mohammed Khan of Patiala. Later, she travelled to Calcutta with her mother and learnt music from classical stalwarts like Mohammad Khan, Abdul Waheed Khan of Kirana Gharana, and finally she became the disciple of Ustad Jhande Khan.

Her first public performance was at the age of fifteen. The poet Sarojini Naidu appreciated her singing during a concert which was organised in the aid of victims of the 1934 Nepal–Bihar earthquake. This encouraged her to continue singing ghazals with more enthusiasm. She cut her first disc for the Megaphone Record Company, at that time. A number of gramophone records were released carrying her ghazals, dadras, thumris, etc. She was amongst the early female singers to give public concerts, and break away from singing in mehfils or private gatherings, and in time came to be known as Mallika-e-Ghazal (Queen of Ghazal).

Begum Akhtar's good looks and sensitive voice made her an ideal candidate for a film career in her early years. When she heard great musicians like Gauhar Jaan and Malka Jaan, however, she decided to forsake the glamour of the film world for a career in Indian classical music. Her supreme artistry in light classical music had its moorings in the tradition of pure classicism. She chose her repertoire in primarily classical modes: a variety of raags, ranging from simple to complex. After the advent of talkie era in India, Begum Akhtar acted in a few Hindi movies in the 1930s. East India Film Company of Calcutta approached her to act in "King for a Day" (alias Ek Din Ka Badshah) and Nal Damayanti in 1933. During 1937-38 she met Meher Baba and sang devotional sufi ghazals, and later became a devotee.

Like others of that era, she sang her songs herself in all her films. She continued acting in the following years. Subsequently, Begum Akhtar moved back to Lucknow where she was approached by the famous producer-director Mehboob Khan, to act in Roti which was released in 1942 and whose music was composed by the maestro Anil Biswas. "Roti" contained six of her ghazals but unfortunately due to some trouble with the producer, Mehboob Khan subsequently deleted three or four ghazals from the film. All the ghazals are available on Megaphone gramophone records. Begum Akhtar, meanwhile, left Bombay and returned to Lucknow. Her name appears differently in various film credits as Akhtaribai Fyzabadi, Akhtaribai Faizabadi, Akhtari and Begum Akhtar.

In 1945, Akhtari Bai married a Lucknow-based barrister, Ishtiaq Ahmed Abbasi, and became known as Begum Akhtar. However, after marriage, due to restrictions by her husband, she could not sing for almost five years and subsequently, fell ill and emotionally depressed. That is when her return to music was prescribed as a befitting remedy, and in 1949 she returned to the recording studios. She sang three ghazals and a dadra at Lucknow All India Radio station. She started crying afterwards and returned to singing in concerts, which she continued to do unto death. She sang publicly in Lucknow, in a women's only concert in aid of the war with China, which was held in 1962.

Her voice matured with time, acquiring richness and depth. She sang ghazals and other light classical pieces, in her inimitable style. She has nearly four hundred songs to her credit. She was a regular performer on All India Radio. She usually composed her own ghazals and most of her compositions were raag based. She also sang the timeless Bengali classical song "Jochona Koreche Aari" (জোছনা করেছে আড়ি).

On 7 October 2017, Google dedicated a Doodle profile to her commemorating the 103rd birthday of Begum Akthar.

== Death ==
During her last concert in Balaramapuram near Thiruvananthapuram in 1974, she raised the pitch of her voice as she felt that her singing had not been as good as she had wanted it to be and felt unwell. The stress she put herself under resulted in her falling ill and she was rushed to the hospital.

She died on 30 October 1974 in the arms of Nilam Gamadia, her friend, who invited her to Ahmedabad, which became her final performance.

Her tomb was a mango orchard within her home, 'Pasand Bagh' in Thakurganj area, of Lucknow. She was buried alongside her mother, Mushtari Sahiba. However, over the years, much of the garden has been lost to the growing city, and the tomb has fallen into disrepair. The marble graves enclosed in a red brick enclosure, were restored in 2012, along with their pietra dura style marble inlay. Attempts are on to convert her home built in 1936 in China bazaar, Lucknow into a museum.

Her disciples include Shanti Hiranand, who later received Padma Shri and wrote a biography Begum Akhtar: The Story of My Ammi (2005). Art critic S. Kalidas directed a documentary on her titled Hai Akhtari.

== Discography ==
1. Begum Akhtar has nearly four hundred songs to her credit.

=== List ===
- See Begum Akhtar songs for comprehensive list.
- Naseeb Ka Chakkar | –
1. "Kalyug Hai Jabse Aaya Maya Ne..."
- Roti | Anna Sahab Mainkar
1. "Wo Hans Rahe Hain Aah Kiye Jaa..."
2. "Ulajh Gaye Nayanwa Chhute Nahin..."
3. "Char Dino Ki Jawani Matwale..."
4. "Ai Prem Teri Balihari Ho..."
5. "Phir Fasle Bahaar Aayi Hai..."
6. "Rehne Laga Hai Dil Me Andhera..."
- Panna Dai | Gyan Dutt
1. "Hamen Yaad Teri Sataane Lagi..."
2. "Main Raja Ko Apne Rijha Ke Rahungi..."
- Dana Pani | Mohan Junior
1. "Ishq Mujhe Aur Kuchh To Yaad Nahi..."
- Ehsaan
1. "Hamen dil mein basaa bhi lo.."

== Filmography ==
Year	Movie name
1933	King for a Day (Director: Raaj Hans)
1934	Mumtaz Beghum
1934	Ameena
1934	Roop Kumari (Director: Madan)
1935	Jawani Ka Nasha
1936	Naseeb Ka Chakkar (Director: Pesi Karani)
1940	AnaarBala (Director: A. M. Khan)
1942	Roti (Director: Mehboob Khan) [credited as Akhtaribai Fyzabadi]
1958	Jalsaghar (Director: Satyajit Ray)[credited as Begum Akhtar]

== Awards and recognition ==
- 1968: Padma Shri
- 1972: Sangeet Natak Akademi Award
- 1975: Padma Bhushan (posthumously)

== Bibliography ==
- In Memory of Begum Akhtar, by Shahid Ali Agha. US Inter Culture Associates, 1979.
- Great Masters of Hindustani Music, by Susheela Misra. Published by Hem Publishers, 1981. Chapter 26.
- Begum Akhtar: The Queen of Ghazal, by Sutapa Mukherjee. Rupa & Co, 2005, ISBN 81-7167-985-4.
- Begum Akhtar: The Story of My Ammi, by Shanti Hiranand. Published by Viva Books, 2005, ISBN 81-309-0172-2.
- Ae Mohabbat… Reminiscing Begum Akhtar, by Jyoti Sabharwal & Rita Ganguly, 2008, ISBN 978-81-904559-3-0.
- Begum Akhtar: Love's Own Voice, by S. Kalidas. 2009, ISBN 978-8174365958.
