= Civic nobility in the Papal States' March of Ancona =

Urban patriciates of the Papal States' March of Ancona (16th–18th centuries)

Civic nobility in the March of Ancona
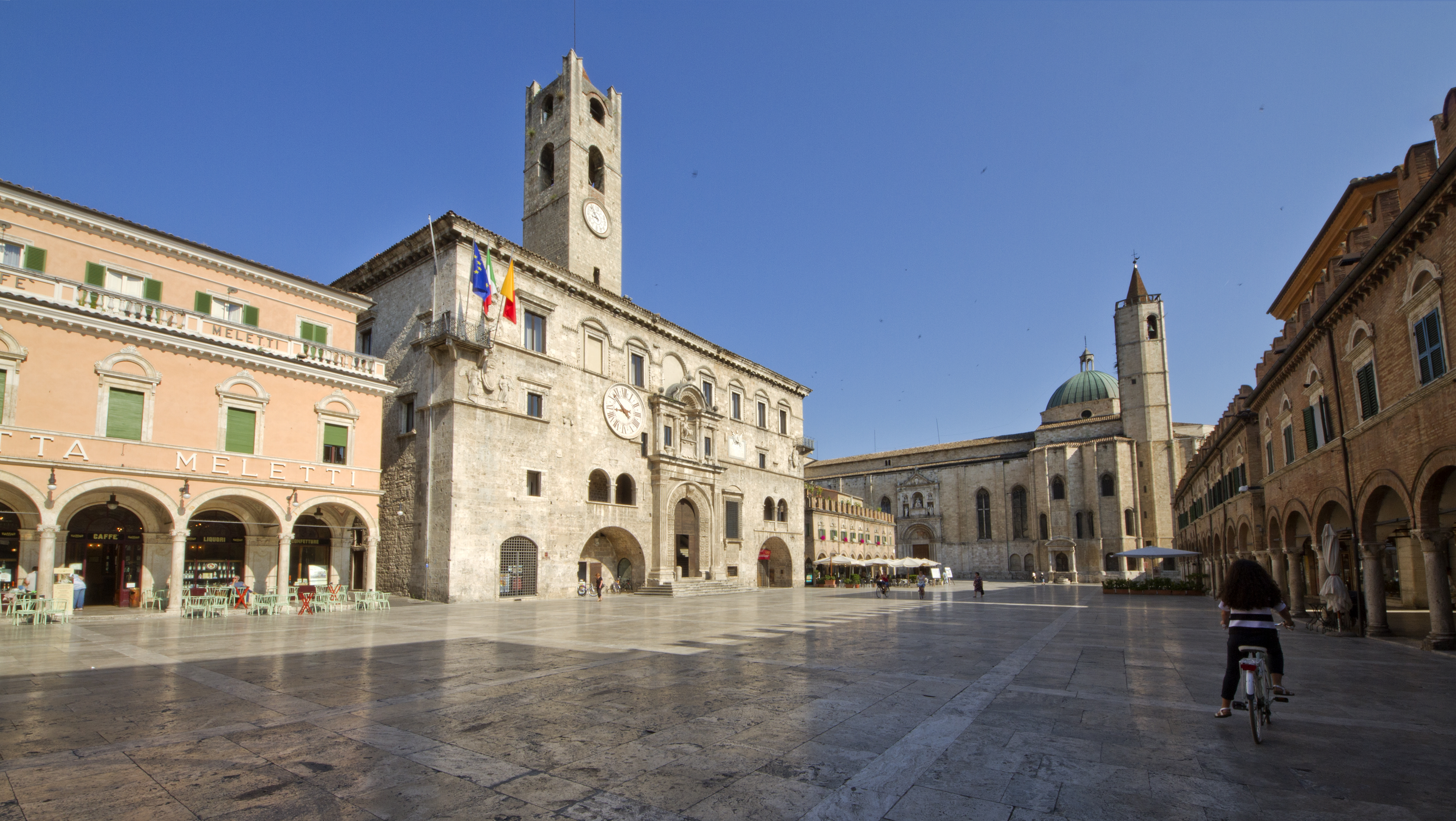
- View of the historic centre of Ascoli Piceno.
- Scope: Urban centres of the March of Ancona (in Italian, Marca Anconitana) under the direct authority of the Apostolic Camera
- Chronology: Origins 12th–13th c. · Apex 16th–18th c. · Reforms 1796–1831 · End 1860–61
- Settlements: Cities (22) and smaller towns (terre) (24)
- Institutions: Hereditary participation in city councils; monopoly over civic magistracies
- Historical significance: Example of oligarchic rule in the Papal States, where municipal government and the patrician order reinforced one another (Middle Ages–early modern period).
- Sources: Statutes; council registers

Civic nobility in the Papal States’ March of Ancona is the hereditary urban patriciate that dominated municipal governments across many centres of the March of Ancona, a Papal province broadly corresponding to today’s Marche region.

== Characteristics of urban patriciates ==
The urban patriciates of the March were characterised by the interplay between municipal power and domination over the rural district, the contado. (Note: The Italian contado goes back to medieval Latin comitatus (“county, territory ruled by a comes or count”) and in the communal period came to designate the rural district under a city’s jurisdiction. See Luca Zenobi, “Beyond the State: Community and Territory-Making in Late Medieval Italy”, in Mario Damen and Kim Overlaet (eds.), Constructing and Representing Territory in Late Medieval and Early Modern Europe, Amsterdam University Press, 2022, pp. 53–79, esp. pp. 59–60.)

From the fifteenth century onward, following the sharp population decline caused by the Black Death, urban powers began to extend their influence over the surrounding countryside (see Agriculture, landownership and urban power). Families holding civic offices gradually coalesced into a relatively homogeneous group, which developed into a form of nobility through the exclusive and hereditary concentration of legislative, executive, and first-instance judicial functions.

In the sixteenth century these urban elites formally excluded other social groups from the governing bodies through the chiusure di ceto, or class closures: (Note: The Italian term chiusure di ceto is translated literally as “estate closures”, but the more immediately intelligible “class closures” is used throughout this article. For statutory evidence on class closures in the March of Ancona, see Zenobi (1976).) legal acts that reserved civic magistracies to nobles alone and made them hereditary within a narrow set of families. By regularly rotating through office, these families secured stable, long-term control over their communities.

For noble status to carry full weight beyond the local arena, class closures had to be not only de facto (in practice) but also explicitly recognised de jure (in law). This, in turn, required either formal recognition (Note: On 24 January 1587 Pope Sixtus V confirmed for the city of Jesi the hereditary closure of its General Council—originally enacted on 18 January 1575—by the apostolic brief Quae pacis et tranquillitatis. The brief confirmed the right to transmit one’s council seat hereditarily to one’s son or nearest kinsman, without conferring any noble style on councillors. Despite the absence of a formal noble attribution, members of Jesi’s council families were recognised as noble by the Sovereign Military Order of Malta from the time of the 1575 closure (see Pompili (2020)).) or, more often, tacit acceptance (Note: The recognition was deemed tacitly granted when, as the competent municipal bodies proceeded to ratify a chiusura di ceto or to introduce new regulations on the matter, such provisions were not rejected or annulled by the central authorities of the Papal State.) by the central authorities of the Papal States. As Claudio Donati notes with reference to class closures in the Marches, “to a large extent it was an autonomous process, in effect undergone and ratified post rem (after the fact) by the Apostolic See.”

=== Relationships between civic and feudal nobility ===
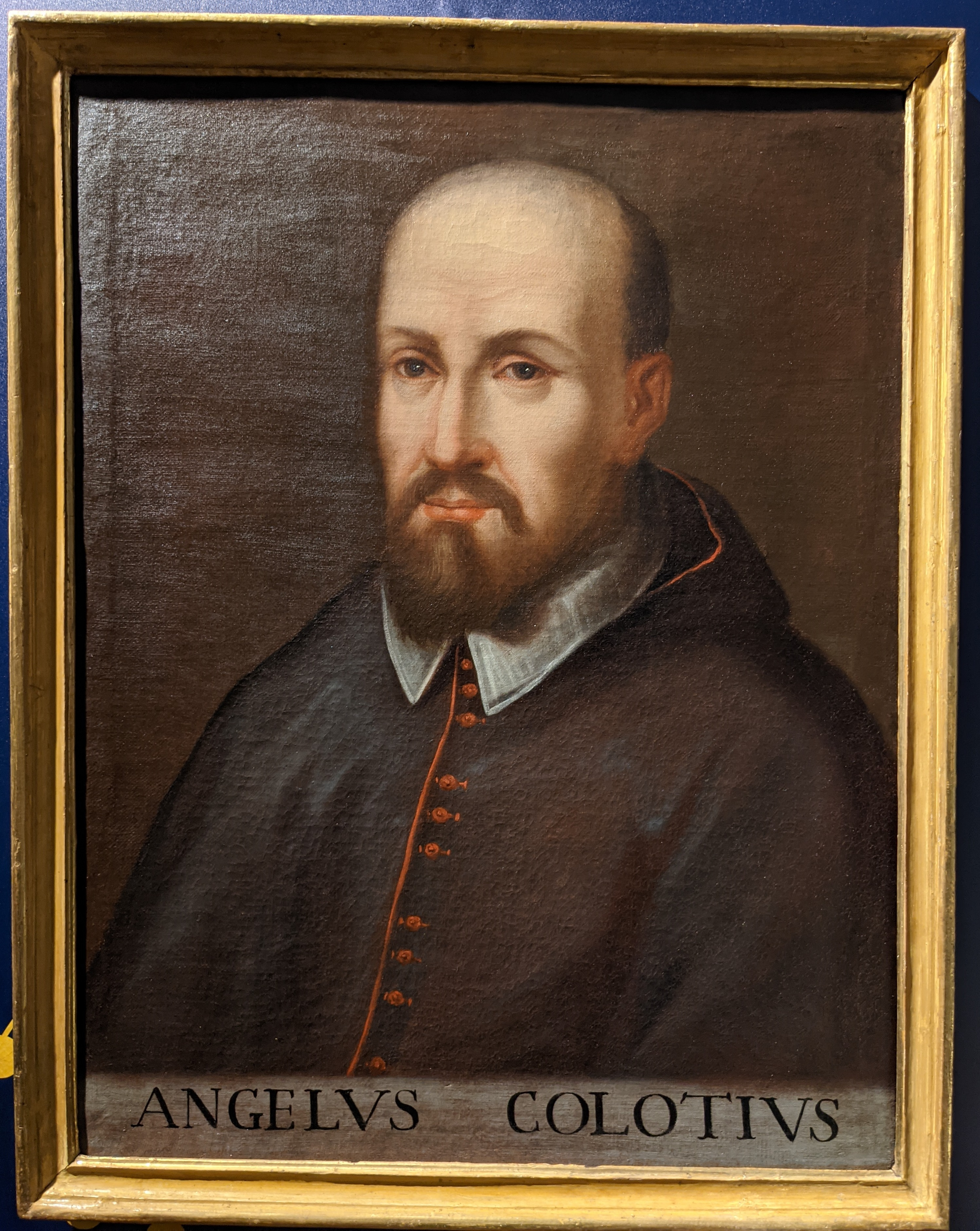
Portrait of Angelo Colocci (1474–1549), Renaissance humanist and Catholic bishop, a member of the Colocci family, one of the oldest civic-noble lineages of Jesi.

In the March of Ancona, council families generally did not belong to the feudal, titled aristocracy (cf. The social origins of noble families). Under the ancien régime, civic nobility was not a “title” in the strict sense, but the privileged status of a family within an estate-based society. It rested on “the hereditary right to exercise—even in an infinitesimal or purely notional measure—royal or state powers. Despite many variations, one has always been considered noble who belongs to an estate that holds, or has held, such powers.”

Despite their different origins—feudal and titled nobility from a sovereign grant, civic nobility from the autonomous development of urban communities—the two strata showed many similarities.

According to jurist Giorgio Cansacchi, former president of the legal council of the Sovereign Military Order of Malta, “the autonomy of the fiefs may be fully equated with that of the free communes; just as in the former the feudal lord possessed public-law powers of varying extent, so in the latter the urban oligarchies held analogous powers … Heredity of power was likewise analogous in both strata, since in both fiefs and aristocratic cities government devolved upon the titled families by right of birth.”

=== Landownership and urban patrician power ===
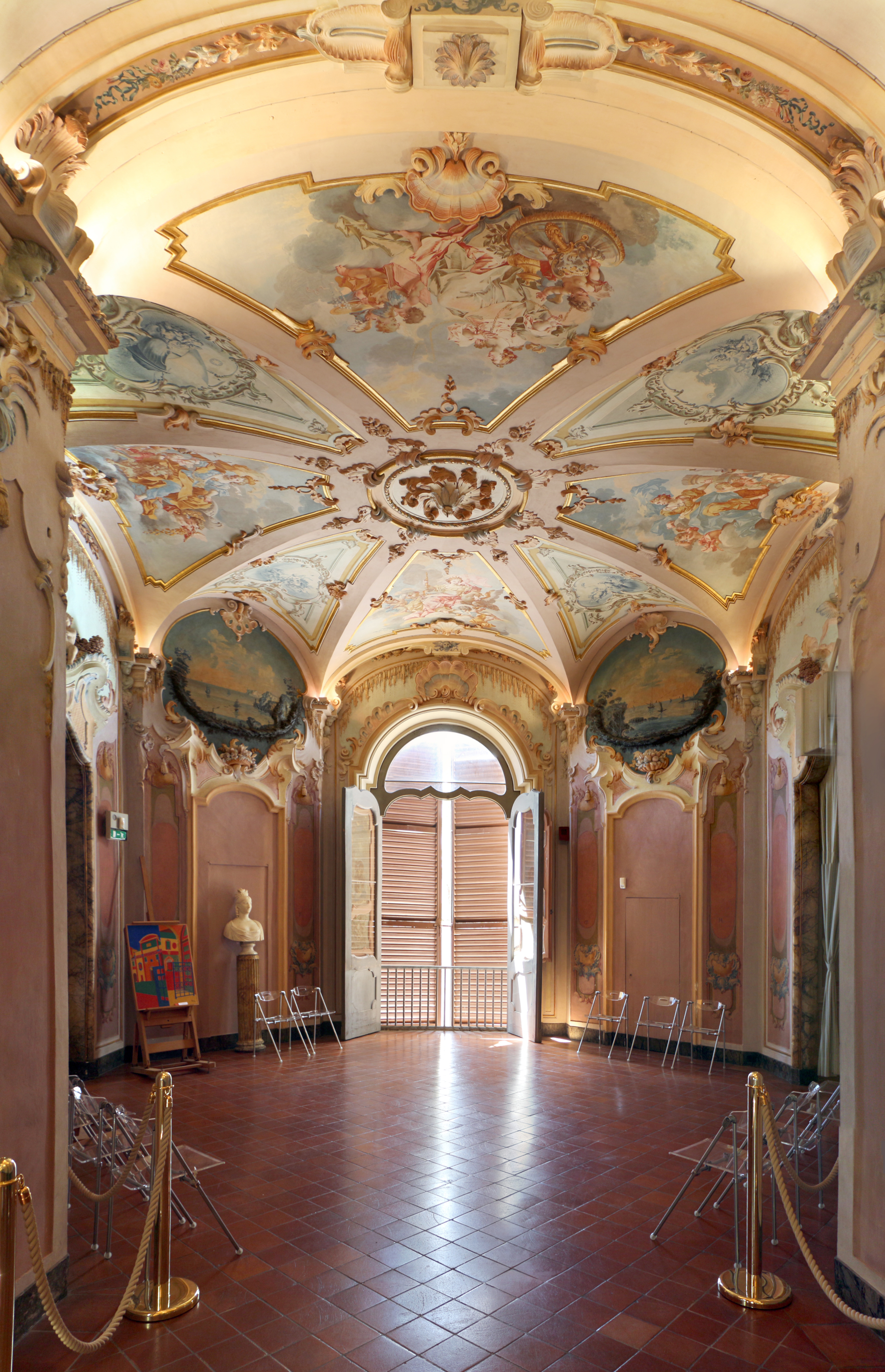
Palazzo Pianetti, with its Rococo stucco gallery (Jesi), the historic residence of a family belonging to the city’s patriciate.

Council-family nobility expressed a hereditary status, built up over generations (Note: An illustrative case is that of the Scoccianti family: recorded as cives possidentes of Cupramontana in the 1471 cadastre, they were admitted to the nobility of Apiro in the early eighteenth century (Zenobi (1976)), yet they had held leading positions in the magistracies of Jesi and other communities of the March for at least three centuries. In the second half of the fifteenth century, when urban oligarchies were beginning to constitute themselves as a closed aristocratic estate, the family sat in Jesi’s general council and consiglio di credenza, as well as in those of Jesi’s contado, with Nardolo Angelelli—prior and camerlengo of Jesi—his sons Gabriello Nardoli and ser Francesco Nardoli Angelelli, captain of one of Jesi’s castles (Jesi Riformanze for 1470–72, in Archetti Giampaolini (1978)). The family also headed the local government (reggimento) of Massaccio, present-day Cupramontana, with Cristoforo Scoccia, son of Gabriello (Colucci (1790), p. LXX), remembered as an ambassador to Pope Leo X, as the castle’s representative in legal disputes with Perugia, as conservator of the walls, as organizer of the militias during the frequent warfare of the period, and as a “benefactor of the homeland”. In the sixteenth century the family continued to practise the notarial profession—an occupation favoured by ruling groups, alongside military and ecclesiastical careers, because it was profitable and considered neither “mechanical” nor “base” (Troscé (1972))—with Gio Antonio Scoccia (Colucci (1790), p. CX). The sixteenth-century surname Scoccia has been traced to the Lombard military term skulka (“guard post”), from which the medieval forms scolca/scocca derive in the sense of “armed guard” (cf. Scocchia: Mastrelli (1973)). In the Cupramontana area, related toponyms recur: the Fondo della Sculcula—documented since the Middle Ages and the site of family holdings according to the 1471 cadastre (Archetti Giampaolini (1978))—which Cherubini (1981) links to an earlier ducal lordship of Ageltrude; the nearby Monte Scoccioni is described in local historiography as a Lombard patrol area defending the castle of Pierosara, near Genga; see “Le fortificazioni longobarde ai confini del ducato di Spoleto”, FederArcheo (PDF), .) and then formalised by urban oligarchies as the Papal States became more administratively centralised. (Note: Berengo (1965): “And jurists declared noble anyone so acknowledged in his native town.”) Noble houses acted as key intermediaries between local territories and the papal centre, helping to connect local interests with those of central government. (Note: Donati (1977): “In many cases the prince favoured the aristocratisation of the councils (and even the creation of fiefs), yet within a political and territorial rationalisation that would ensure and facilitate control by the central bureaucracy”.)

Urban patriciates drew their economic strength above all from landed property. (Note: “Cives Esini, sudore, et sanguine pauperum Comitatensium ditati sunt" (The citizens of Jesi have been enriched by the sweat and blood of the poor inhabitants of the county), from the bull of Pope Pius V of 3 October 1567 (cit. in Berengo (1965)).) For the Marche, long-run research (1400–1800) shows a strong concentration of lay landownership in the hands of a small number of families. Often the same lineages held the upper positions in local churches and, through leaseholding and emphyteusis, indirectly controlled much of the ecclesiastical estates as well.

In addition to the authority they exercised as landowners over the contado, noble proprietors also held the authority that came with municipal office. They served as officials responsible for justice, administration and defence; managed the annona and grain banks; apportioned tax burdens; administered the monti di pietà; (Note: The monti di pietà were local credit institutions of Franciscan origins, long established even in minor towns (terre). In Apiro, for instance, the Monte di Pietà was founded privately in 1549 and remained active until 1941; in the early twentieth century its board still included members of families noble in Apiro in the eighteenth century.) financed major charitable institutions; led the governing bodies of churches and convents; and wielded extensive informal and extrajudicial powers.

In the eighteenth century, families of the civic nobility amounted to less than two per cent of the total population of the March. The oligarchic nature of government is particularly clear, for example, in Arcevia: towards the end of the eighteenth century—out of more than eight thousand inhabitants—effective power was concentrated in the hands of just sixteen individuals, all nobles.

The institutional basis of civic nobility—legal segregation among families and the exercise of jurisdiction—is stated explicitly by Francesco Brunamonti, a member of a ruling family from Roccacontrada (now Arcevia) in the second half of the eighteenth century; his account is a contemporary, insider testimony from within the urban patriciate:

“The clearest sign of the esteem our homeland has always had for itself is the distinction it wished some few select families to hold over others, however honest and well-to-do; to them, for as long as they endure, it grants in preference to all others the Gonfalon of Justice. This is the true legal segregation which, joined to jurisdiction, is the foundation of nobility. [In those urban centres where this does not occur] one sees, among public representatives, that equality which excludes any kind of nobility, because it grants no public distinction to any number of families by which they might be known as unlike and unequal to all others, but rather as segregated and superior.”

— Francesco Brunamonti (c. 1750)

== The geography of aristocratic cities and smaller towns (terre) ==
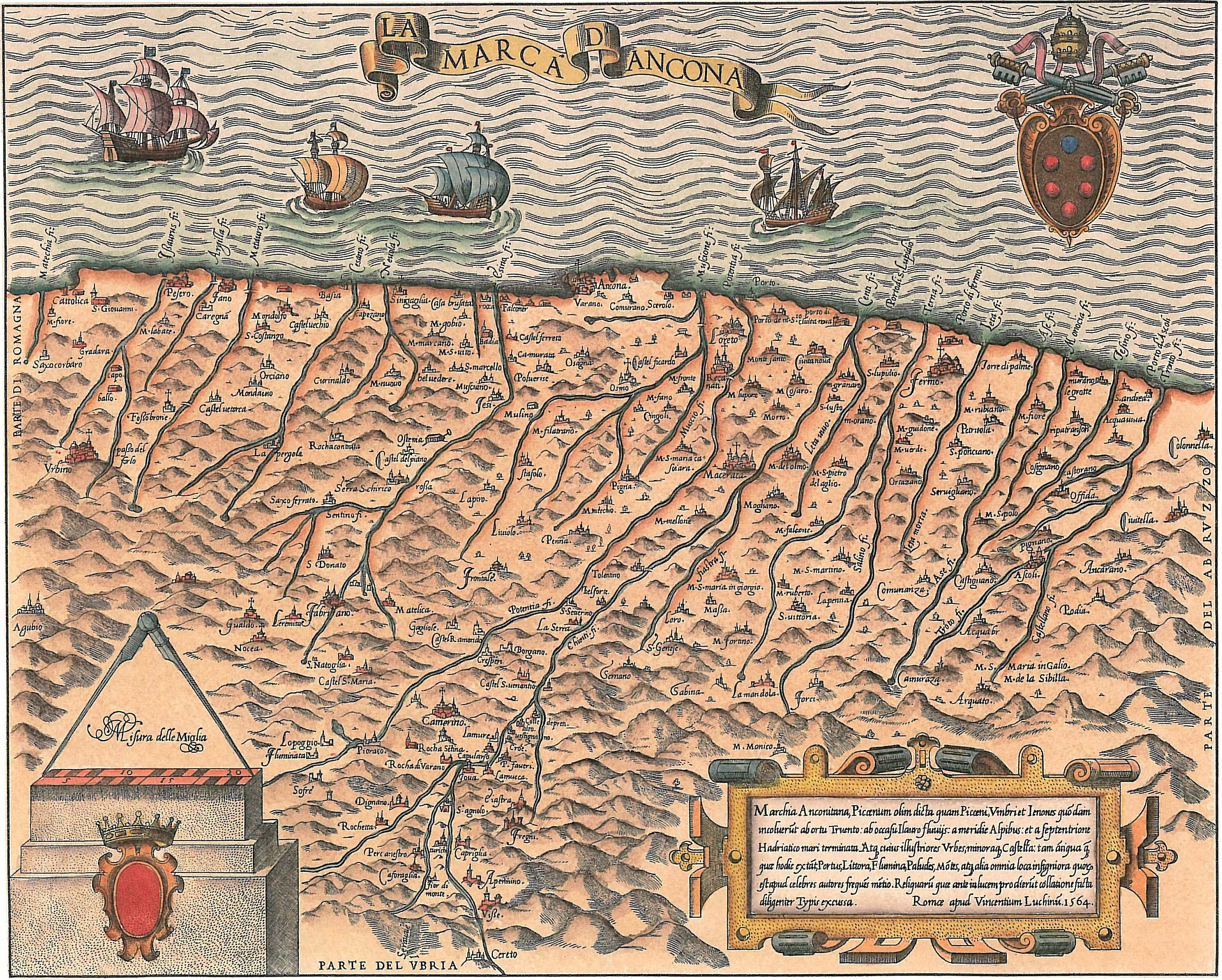
Map of the March of Ancona (1564), showing the main urban centres of the region.

The distinctive features of civic nobility in the March of Ancona can be clarified by distinguishing between the region’s two main types of urban centres: cities and terre.

The term terra, introduced by the administrative apparatus of the Papal States from the late thirteenth century, designated those communes which, not being episcopal sees, could not claim the title of civitas. Yet in political importance, economic and social life, religious functions and often in size, many of these communities were very similar to cities. (Note: Pirani (2014): “From the late Middle Ages, the March of Ancona was characterised by a flattened demographic hierarchy without clear hegemonies. This settlement pattern—dense with medium- and small-sized centres—makes it difficult, perhaps futile, to draw a sharp line between city and minor centre, since the distinction naturally narrows and nearly vanishes. Many medium and modest centres exhibit by the end of the Middle Ages a social structure, institutional apparatus, and economic life of an urban stamp, in no way comparable to rural communities. To designate such cases, historiography has introduced the expression ‘quasi-cities’.” For an overview of centres and hierarchies in the region, see Zenobi (1976).)

Aristocratic regimes were established in the twenty-two cities of the March and in a roughly equal number of independent terre—about half of the immediate subiectae—since only these communities retained significant political–administrative and judicial powers, which, as class closures took hold, were progressively monopolised by the urban nobility. (Note: Abbot Colucci notes: “I observe that the Magistracy of the terre, even when composed of graduates and office-holders—as Malatesta was in the fifteenth century, and both before and after, as thousands of such documents show—was commonly given the title ‘Nobles’, in the same way as it was given to the magistrates of the Cities. This is something that today would cause great astonishment among certain individuals from some city where it is thought that this title is an exclusive privilege of cities alone. And yet the condition of those terre in those times was the same as in our own day; and just as today the Cities are distinguished from the terre, so equally then they were distinguished, without prejudice, however, to the titles of the respective nobility that pertained to each,” Colucci1786, vol. XXVIII, p. 60, note 24.)

The map shows the distribution of cities (in blue) and terre (in orange) with aristocratic regimes, and independent terre without aristocratic regimes (in grey).

Distribution of cities and terre in the March of Ancona under aristocratic regime, and terre without aristocratic regime in the March of Ancona (Note: The map excludes centres in the area corresponding to today’s northern Marche since, between 1443 and 1631, those territories belonged to the Duchy of Urbino, an autonomous state yet vassal of the Holy See. After devolving to the Papal States in 1631, the area formed the Legation of Urbino until its suppression during the French occupation in 1808.) Interactive map of the distribution of cities and terre in the Papal March.

Cities emerge as the main territorial poles, whereas terre with aristocratic regimes emerged mostly at the edges of the sphere of influence of their surrounding rural districts (contadi). Two areas of higher concentration stand out: (1) a southern belt between Tolentino–Macerata–Recanati and Ascoli Piceno–Montalto delle Marche–Fermo; and (2) a northern arc bounded by Corinaldo–Ostra, Jesi, and Cingoli–Fabriano. This pattern reflects the tendency of cities to absorb minor centres into their own contadi. Where a strong urban pole was absent, smaller communes emerged that reproduced, on a reduced scale, similar dynamics of territorial subordination. (Note: Mineo (2009): “By the mid-fourteenth century, after the crisis of 1348, the only medium-sized city, Ancona (which perhaps had some 20,000 inhabitants), did not exercise a hegemonic role over its hinterland – nor did the smaller cities of Fano, Fermo, Camerino and Ascoli – and south of the Esino the broad area of the central Marche contained a number of more significant centres, namely Fermo and Camerino, alongside Fabriano, Recanati and San Severino, which, however, did not develop, except partially, the function of ‘central places’: no stable urban hierarchy thus emerged in the full communal age, so that the demographically stronger centres remained embedded within a highly articulated network of communities – altogether some seventy centres (including the more populous ones), consisting predominantly of communities (many of them urban in character) with between 200 and 2,000 families. It is no coincidence that, for regions such as these, scholars have spoken of ‘micro-cities’ and ‘micro-territories’.”)

By contrast, most of the independent terre without an aristocratic regime (in grey) are concentrated in the central–southern belt of the March, especially in the area bounded by the rural districts of the cities of Montalto delle Marche, Ripatransone and Ascoli Piceno, and by the aristocratic terre of Amandola and Montelparo, which experienced some of the earliest class-closure measures in the region (cf. chronology of the class closures in the terre). Further north, Caldarola, Belforte del Chienti and Urbisaglia lie in an area in direct contact with the cities of Camerino and Tolentino. (Note: Terre without class closure (from Zenobi (1976), passim): Ancarano; Appignano; Belforte; Caldarola; Cossignano; Force; Maltignano; Monte Noro; Monte San Martino; Montedinove; Montefiore; Montegranaro; Montemonaco; Offida; Patrignone; Porchia; Rocca di Monte Varmine; Rotella; Santa Maria in Lapide; Santa Vittoria; Sarnano; Staffolo; Urbisaglia.)

== Rise and decline of the civic nobility ==
From the mid-sixteenth century, a power structure consolidated in which the Pope, as a princely ruler, relied on the mediation and formal endorsement of urban elites, while seigneurial and feudal jurisdictions were progressively curtailed. (Note: Ammannati (2020): "With regard to the March of Ancona, one can go so far as to say that the authority of the Papal State operated stably and continuously only from the second half of the fifteenth century—after the definitive dismantling, begun in the early years of the century and prolonged for more than fifty years, of a whole series of old and new lordships that had attempted to oust papal power from the area. In quick succession fell the Simonetti of Jesi (1406), the Cima of Cingoli (1424), the sons of Conte da Carrara at Ascoli (1426), the Chiavelli of Fabriano (1436), the Smeducci of San Severino (1443), Francesco Sforza—formerly Marquis of the March and master of over half the region between 1433 and 1447—the Paganelli of Montalboddo (1449), and finally the Malatesta, forced to surrender Senigallia and Fano (1462–63).")

Although the Ecclesiastical State saw significant administrative centralisation, in practice it rested on two pillars: a clerical core at the centre and a widespread patriciate in the peripheral territories. (Note: Carocci (2010): "In this kind of elective and collegial monarchy, the central government had an urgent need for the collaboration and support of local oligarchies. The aristocracy, patriciates and all preeminent groups found in the Church a solid backing to preserve their privileges against popular pressures and, ultimately, to keep themselves at the top of local societies.") This pattern was especially evident in the March, long characterised by a dense network of urban centres with strong traditions of self-government, (Note: Pirani (2018): "In 1392 Niccolò Spinelli, a jurist and diplomat at the Angevin court of Naples, could remark of the March of Ancona: Sunt in ista provincia multa notabilissima castra, quasi sint civitates (“There are in this province many very notable castles, as if they were cities”).") in a configuration that scholars have described as "pact-based". (Note: Zenobi (1976): "Negotiations and concessions—guided by a logic of exchange, certainly unequal yet contracted and bilateral—allowed local oligarchies to maintain, and often expand in real terms, those powers that seigneurial dominion had compressed; and, vis-à-vis a distant and locally under-represented central authority, to recover a distinctly political force in decisive matters (finance, grain supply, taxation, jurisdiction), especially across their subject contadi, where, down to the fall of the ancien régime, a very broad sphere of mediated dominion persisted.")

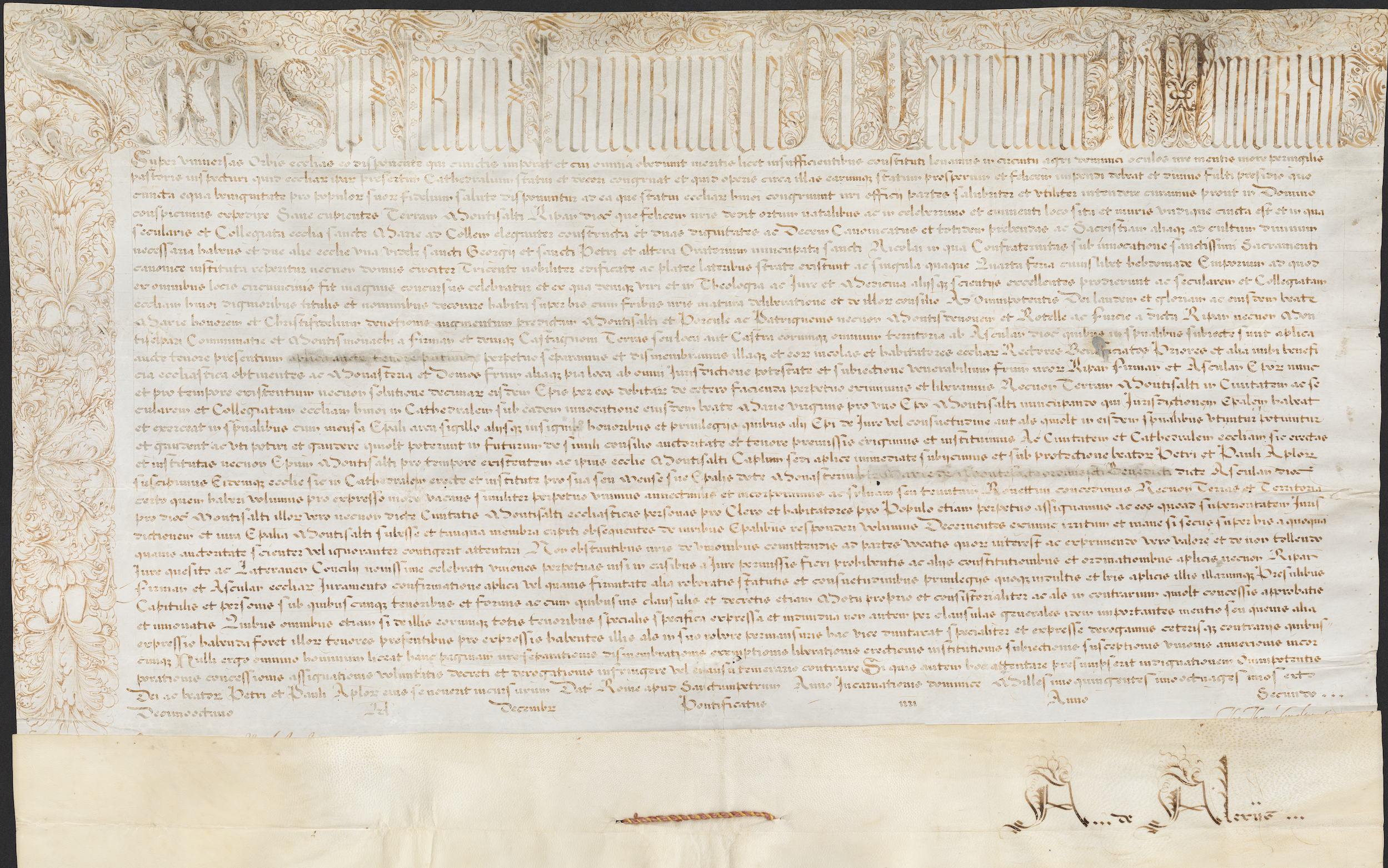
Papal bull issued in 1586 by Pope Sixtus V establishing the Diocese of Montalto, illustrating the direct intervention of the papacy in the institutional arrangements of the March of Ancona.

Public offices in cities and smaller centres were often monopolised by families tied to the Roman Curia by relations of dependence but, in most cases, chosen by the oligarchies themselves through class closures and autonomous acts of aggregation. Only rarely was the process of aristocratising local government managed directly by papal officials, (Note: In Amandola, the 1470 statute did not emerge locally but was drafted and imposed by papal commissioners (Donati (1977)).) producing an extremely fragmented political–territorial mosaic. (Note: Zenobi (1994): "An oligarchic power in Papal cities that precedes the seigneurial experience, coexists—albeit weakened—with it, and in any case survives it, showing over the long run a strong capacity for endurance and recovery." See also Chittolini (2004).)

Rather than simply limiting local power, the central authority tended to ally with it, seeing it as essential for peace, social order and stable tax collection. The interests of the two levels were also aligned because upper clerical and state elites and peripheral ruling groups often came from similar social backgrounds: from the late seventeenth century onwards the origin of the popes—previously alternating among the great houses of Italy, especially in the centre-north—narrowed to the territories of the Papal States, from Clement XI Albani and Innocent XIII Conti through a long series of Romagnol and Marchigian pontiffs to Pius IX Mastai-Ferretti.

=== Election to city councils as a marker of family nobility ===
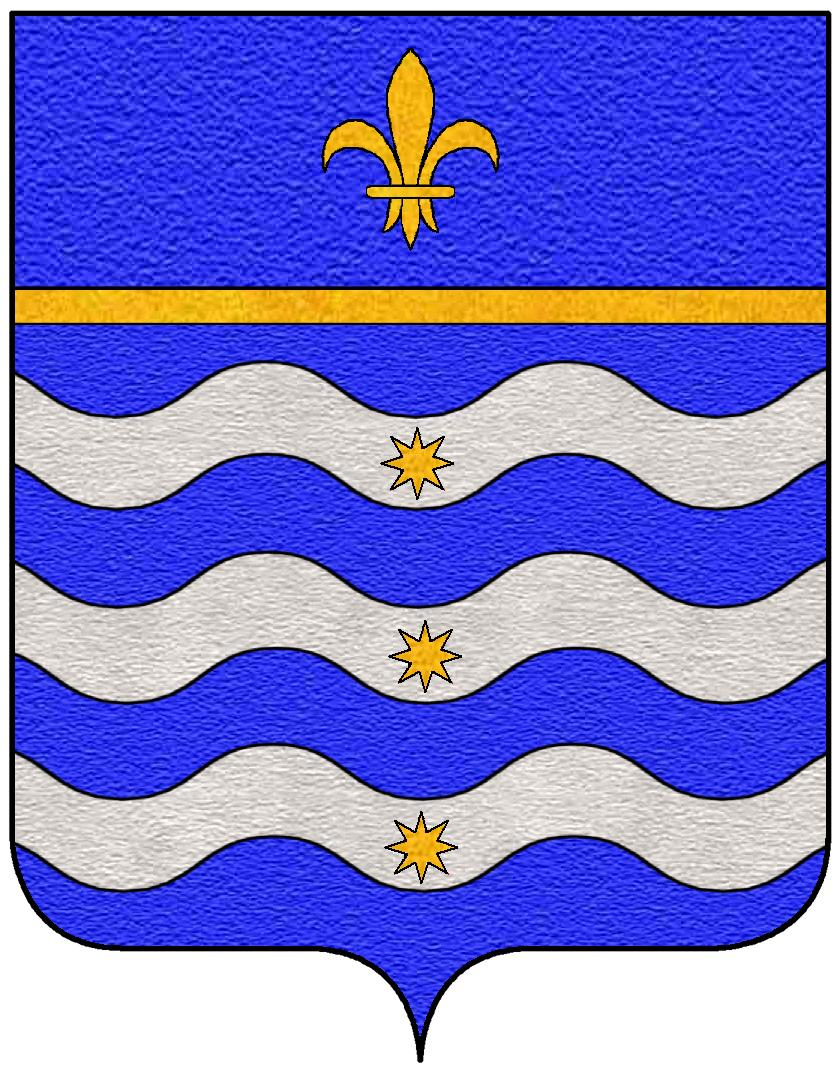
Coat of arms of Honorati family of Jesi, attested among the houses of the city’s patriciate.

Under this system, membership in the city councils became the main visible sign that a family belonged to the patriciate and, more broadly, to the noble estate.

The exclusive control of the main civic magistracies—councils, priorate and gonfaloniere—gave patrician families hereditary access to political and administrative power, including local jurisdiction (merum et mixtum imperium (Note: In early modern legal usage, the Latin merum et mixtum imperium (“pure and mixed command”) denoted full jurisdiction—both criminal (merum imperium, i.e., high justice including corporal or capital punishment) and civil/lesser (mixtum imperium). In the Papal States, this imperium was formally delegated by the Holy See to cities and local communities and exercised collectively through their magistracies as a municipal jurisdiction rather than as a feudal right. In practice, in cities governed by urban patriciates, noble citizens exercised that jurisdiction by holding and controlling the communal offices.)), which had been delegated by the Holy See to the municipal communities. Combined with a lifestyle more nobilium, (Note: The more nobilium requirement comprised abstention from mechanical trades, kinship ties with other noble families (local or not), a decent residence within the walls, and the enjoyment of rights of chapelries and/or patronage, see Zenobi (1976).) this led to the recognition of a family’s noble status, an orientation that became increasingly explicit from the sixteenth century.

According to the jurist Carmelo Arnone, a scholar of noble law and a close student of the early modern institutions of the March, “when the noble councils aggregated an individual they did not create nobility in him, but ascertained and declared that he and his family—by antiquity, way of life, social and economic position, ability, and kinship—possessed the requisites for admission to the council. The nobility of those belonging to the civic councils was therefore declaratory, not attributive, and furthermore a generous nobility, (Note: Etymology: from the Latin genus, generis (“lineage”) → generosus (“of noble lineage,” “born of good stock”), attested in Cicero, Livy, and Seneca → Italian generoso (“noble by birth”). In Italian noble law and heraldic doctrine, nobiltà generosa denotes “nobility of blood”; cf. medieval Latin nobiles et generosi and generosi viri.) that is, stemming from a long line of forebears.”

=== The social origins of noble families ===
Coat of arms of the Leopardi family of Recanati, belonging to the city’s urban patriciate.

The historian Bandino Giacomo Zenobi shows that in the eighteenth century, within the aristocratic reggimenti of the terre, nearly one-third of houses dated to before the sixteenth century and only one-fifth went back to the medieval commune (eleventh–fourteenth centuries); of these latter, fewer than half were of feudal origin, amounting to about 7 per cent of the total.

A similar predominance of civic over feudal origins appears in the cities as well, although with a larger feudal component and a generally greater antiquity—reflecting the older and more substantial structuring of their social and political landscape.

At the same time, among non-feudal houses, origins in the popular artifices are only rarely attested. Zenobi concludes that they likely derived from the so-called boni homines: urban elites immediately below the feudal milites, who from the earliest communal period secured social pre-eminence through landholding and through chancery functions in municipal and judicial administration. (Note: The boni homines are associated with the origins of the Italian communes. Beginning in the 11th century, in the March of Ancona, the wealthier and more educated citizens—many of whom had served as ministeriales within the feudal administrations of bishops and clergy—began to assume responsibility for the governance of the populace, the minores, gradually but persistently wresting control of civil affairs from the churches. The boni homines were thus the cives maiores who sat on the restricted or special councils from which the consuls were chosen – Colini Baldeschi (1900) – and who directed the most vital affairs of the commune as syndics, procurators, and witnesses in the most important public acts. They pioneered civic legal practice and contributed decisively to the secularisation of administration and landownership, Giardina (1932). To this embryonic urban aristocracy were soon added the nobles and milites of feudal origin who had settled in towns, thereby forming the social estate of the maiores as the commune began to extend its influence over the surrounding contado.)

=== Civic memory and self-representation ===
Cover of volume XII of Delle antichità picene by Giuseppe Colucci, an eighteenth-century antiquarian collection devoted to the history of the cities and families of the March of Ancona.

Between the seventeenth and eighteenth centuries, alongside their role in governing urban institutions, the elites of the Papal March developed a dense body of municipal historiography. This included local histories, documentary collections, genealogies, origin myths, and civic chronicles, typically produced by scholars—often clerics—closely connected to urban noble networks.

Drawing on the systematic use of archives and primary sources, and influenced by the historiographical model of Ludovico Antonio Muratori, this production contributed to the construction of civic memory while simultaneously functioning as a form of self-representation for local ruling elites.

As Francesco Pirani has noted, eighteenth-century municipal histories became a “privileged laboratory for the construction of urban identities, as well as those of their ruling groups, in a continuous cultural exchange between the production of civic memory and the shaping of aristocratic memory—more precisely, in a constant projection of the latter’s criteria, tastes, and aspirations onto the former.” This dynamic rested on the assumption that “there exists a privileged relationship between nobility and history, whereby the past of a city and that of its leading families mutually belong to one another.”

On a regional scale, a notable example was the thirty-two-volume collective work Delle antichità picene (1792), coordinated by the abbot Giuseppe Colucci. The project sought to integrate local memories within a broader shared framework, capable of encompassing the plurality of urban centers in the March. In parallel, within the field of ecclesiastical history—often closely intertwined with the civic identity of episcopal sees—one finds works such as De ecclesiae Camerinensis pontificibus (1762) by Ottavio Turchi and Memorie istorico-critiche della chiesa e de’ vescovi di Osimo (1783) by Pompeo Compagnoni.

All of these authors belonged to the civic nobility of the March: the Colucci were nobles of Ascoli, Camerino, and Penna San Giovanni; the Turchi were nobles of Apiro and Tolentino and patricians of Camerino; and the Compagnoni were patricians of Macerata, also aggregated into several smaller communities.

While for most of the eighteenth century historical writing remained anchored in the municipal dimension, toward the end of the century attempts emerged to reframe memory on a regional basis. These efforts remained incomplete and were soon interrupted by the French occupation.

=== Urban space and monumental representation ===
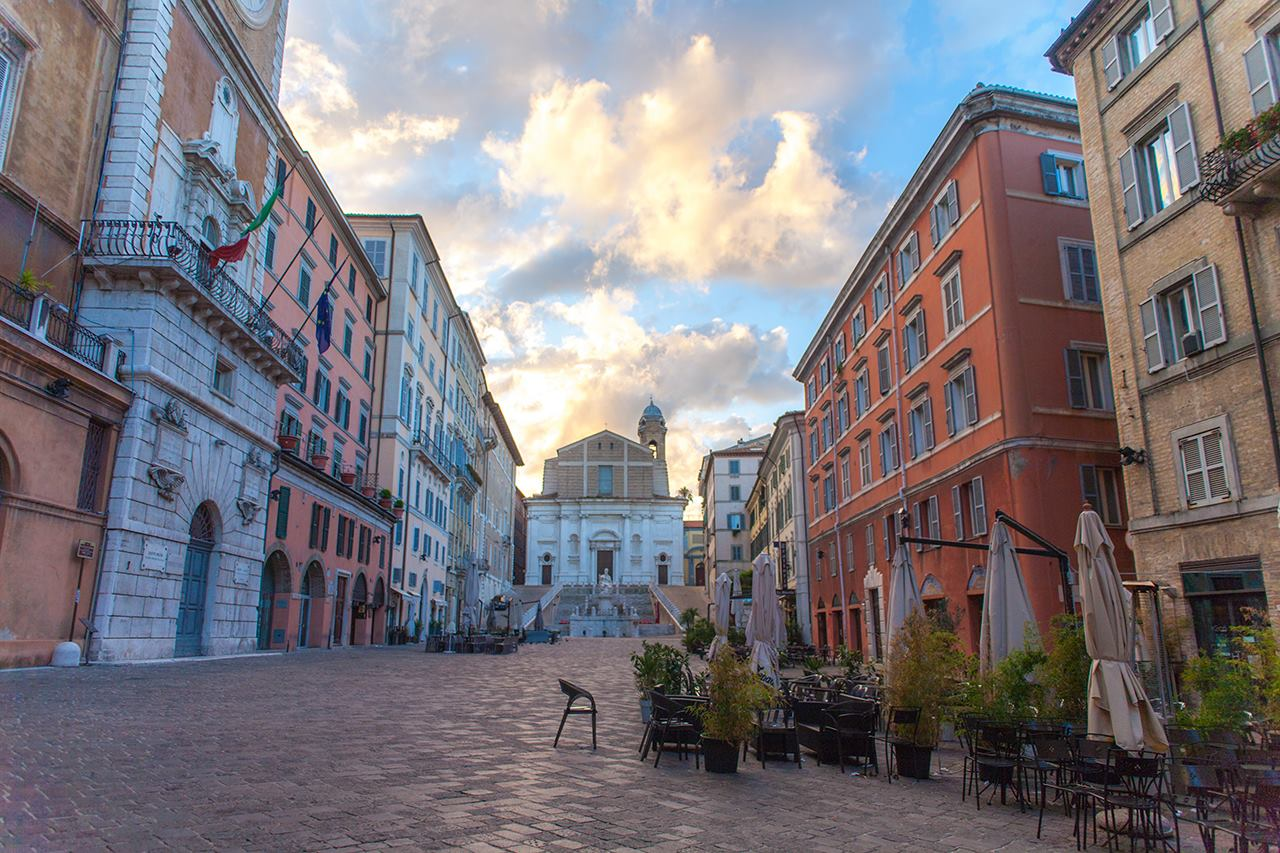
Piazza del Plebiscito in Ancona, a civic space framed by religious buildings, noble palaces, and seats of urban power.

The urban patriciate shaped the cityscape through the siting of residences, the control of major thoroughfares, and the monumental definition of public squares.

Between the fifteenth and eighteenth centuries, urban space became increasingly hierarchical and functionally differentiated, with aristocratic residential clusters, “noble” squares, and a clearer spatial segregation within the city.

These dynamics were supported by the growth of grain exports from the port of Ancona, facilitated by the free-port status granted by Pope Clement XII in 1732. Rising revenues strengthened the economic base of propertied elites and reinforced their strategies of social legitimation.

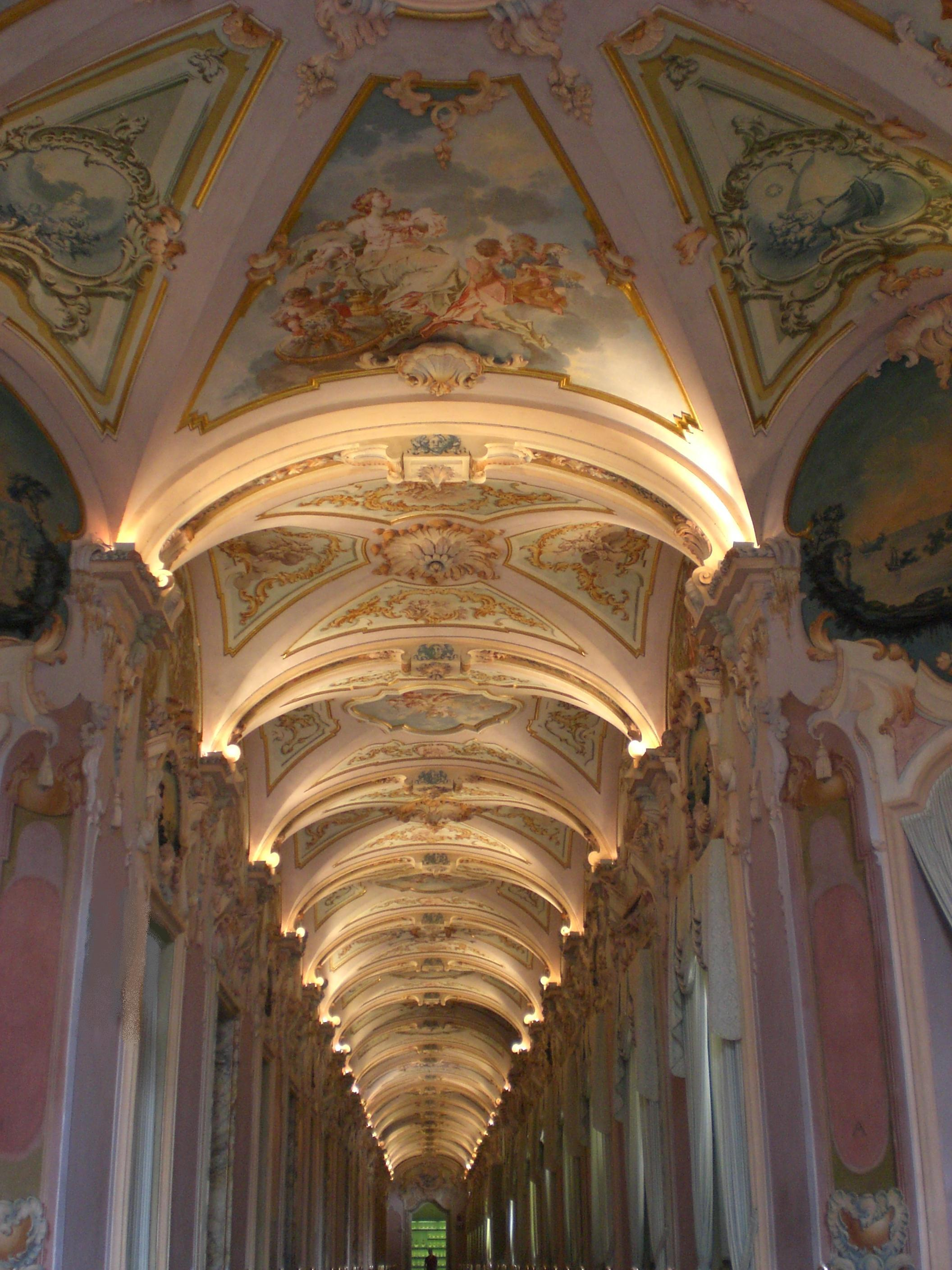
Palazzo Pianetti in Jesi, gallery of stuccoes.

In this context, as noted by the architectural historian Fabio Mariano, the renewal of patrician architecture in the March focused primarily on the transformation of interior spaces in sixteenth- and seventeenth-century palaces—entrance halls, grand staircases, and reception rooms—rather than on the outward display of façades, which generally remained restrained.

Residences such as Palazzo Pianetti in Jesi, Palazzo Ferretti in Ancona, Palazzo Campana in Osimo, and Palazzo Accorretti in Filottrano highlight the centrality of representational interiors, often richly decorated. Symbolic expression thus shifted from external display to the articulation of interior spaces.

This transformation responded to new forms of social visibility and sociability, increasingly enacted in more private settings among selected circles of guests, at a time when aristocratic lifestyles from major Italian cities circulated more widely through practices such as the Grand Tour.

The adoption of Roman and Bolognese models, together with the involvement of architects active within papal patronage networks, connected the civic elites of the March to broader architectural currents. Among the most notable cases are the projects by Luigi Vanvitelli for the Ercolani Palace in Ancona.

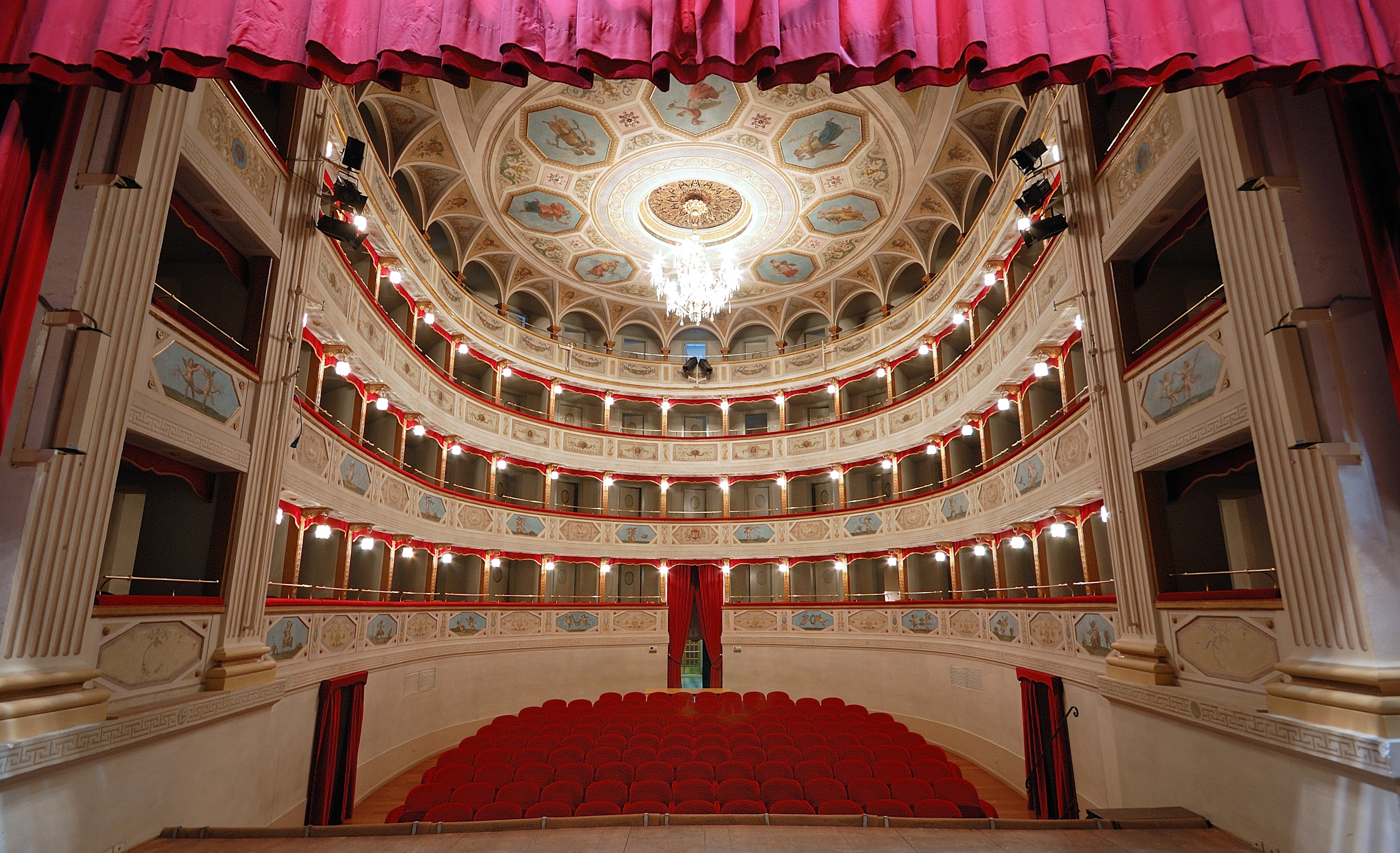
Interior of the Teatro Feronia in San Severino Marche, an example of a nineteenth-century box theater.

In the early nineteenth century, with the collapse of ancien régime institutional structures, some functions of sociability and public visibility shifted to new urban venues.

In the March, this led to the spread of the box theater model (teatri di condominio), financed and managed by associations of box holders, in which ownership of theater boxes served as a marker of social distinction.

These theaters became spaces of collective representation for urban elites, complementing the reception rooms of patrician residences.

=== End of the Ancien Régime and the decline of noble dominance ===
The urban aristocracies of the March gradually came to surpass, in decorum, prestige, culture and political influence, the less wealthy families of feudal origin, while at the same time adopting their lifestyle models. (Note: Donati (1977): "Even as regards their way of life, the nobility of the terre did not substantially differ from that of the larger cities. One need only think of their dwellings, with the inevitable private chapel or oratory: ‘these,’ observes B. G. Zenobi, ‘were the only eighteenth-century or earlier buildings that, together with those used for civic or religious functions, dominated by size and workmanship over the rest of the constructions and still confer on the terre that host them a particular and unmistakable character.’ One might also think of the rights of jus patronatus over churches, ecclesiastical benefices, commendæ, chapels or simple altars, which the nobles of the terre generally enjoyed; or again of the family sepulchres ‘intended as if to perpetuate in the hereafter the noble condition of their owners,’ or of the entails ‘instituted to prevent the dispersion of patrimonies and thus to ensure the survival of their way of life.’") They retained their economic pre-eminence up to the Unification of Italy. This position was lost only in the second half of the nineteenth century, when the abolition of entails, (Note: A fideicommissum was a legal institution by which an estate—often land, houses, or other family property—was bound to remain intact and undivided, passing entirely from one generation to the next. In practice, it prevented the fragmentation of assets among heirs, thus ensuring the continuity of family wealth and prestige over time.) of patronage rights, (Note: Negri (1841): "The jus patronatus was a right that allowed noble families to exercise significant influence over a church. Those who held this right—often obtained by endowing an altar or chapel with an income tied to landed property—could appoint a priest to the church and benefit from the revenues and privileges attached to it, such as the celebration of Masses for the family. It was effectively comparable to an ecclesiastical fief, since part of the church’s “spiritual jurisdiction” or “ecclesiastical sovereignty” was devolved to a family. This hereditary right strengthened the prestige and power of noble families, serving as a bridge between the secular and the ecclesiastical spheres.") and of lay benefices led to the fragmentation of their patrimonies.

The end of the ancien régime nonetheless brought a radical reconfiguration of the structures on which the civic nobility of the March had relied for centuries.

The Italian campaigns of the French Revolutionary Wars set this process in motion. They stripped the urban patriciates of their essential resource of power—political hegemony—which they would not regain even after the Restoration. (Note: Zenobi (1994): "It is curious to observe how, comparing the data for the eighteenth century with those emerging from the surveys for the years 1825–55, the quantitative relations among the properties of the various social classes had not undergone significant modifications, despite the fifty years having been dense with events and upheavals.")

With the Restoration, the Papal States cautiously embraced the uniformising and centralising tendencies inherited from the Jacobin and Napoleonic experiences. It abolished municipal statutes, ended the age-old subordination of rural districts (contadi) to the cities, and opened civic councils to the participation of non-noble classes.

== Agriculture, landownership and urban power ==
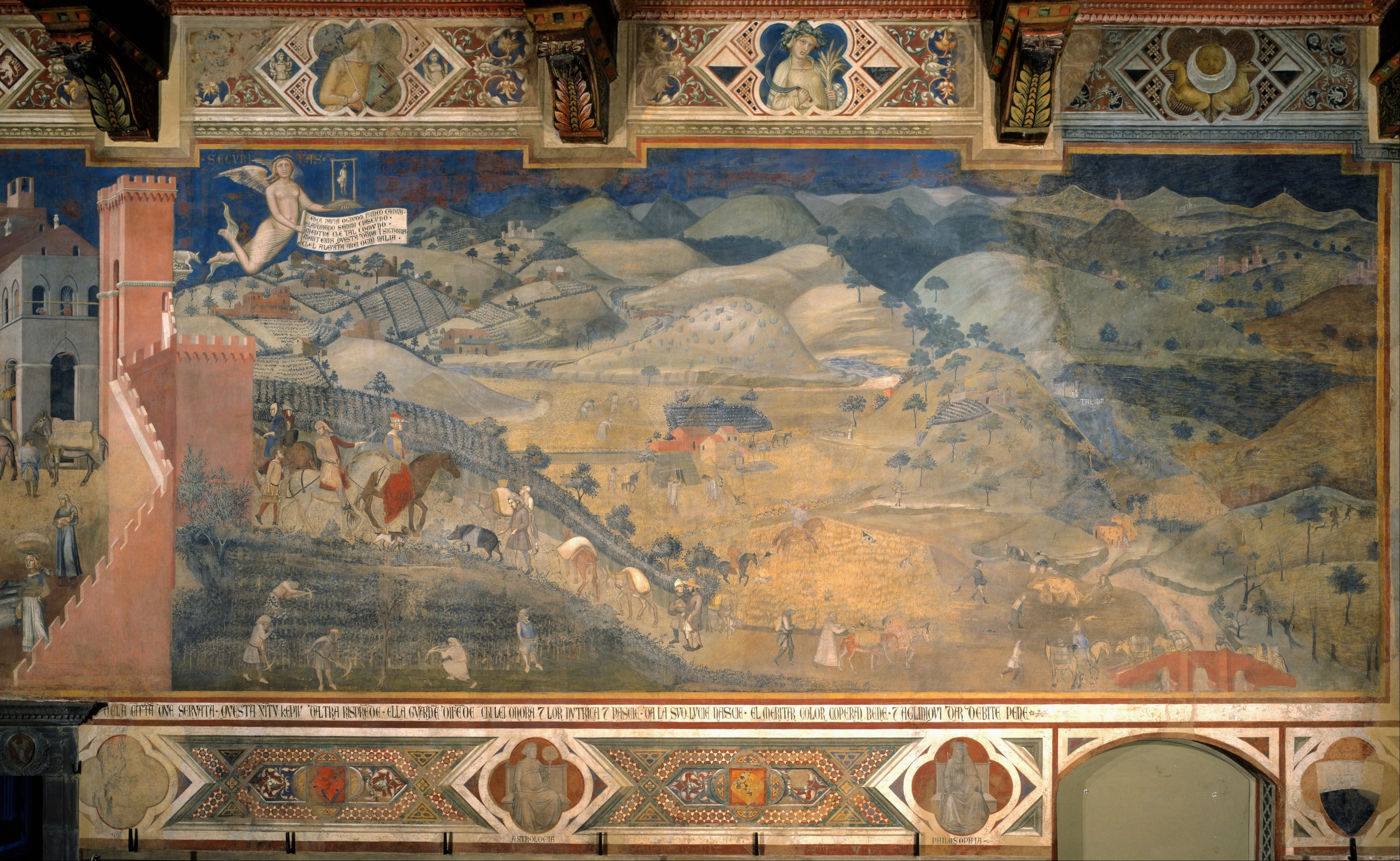
Ambrogio Lorenzetti’s cycle The Allegory of Good and Bad Government (1338–1339), showing the agrarian landscape and the relationship between city and countryside in medieval Italy.

For the Marche there is evidence of a strong fifteenth-century expansion of sharecropping within a broad wave of agrarian recolonisation following a fourteenth-century phase of widespread abandonment.

The long-term consequences of these dynamics are particularly clear in the case of Macerata, where the concentration of landed property allows a close view of the links between rural ownership and oligarchic power.

=== Land concentration and oligarchic dynamics: the case of Macerata ===
The gradual concentration of landed property in the hands of the nobility is well documented in Macerata.

In the mid-thirteenth century, at the height of the communal regime of the Popolo, Macerata counted nearly 1,900 property owners. Three centuries later, by the mid-sixteenth century, the number had fallen to 650, and then declined steadily to just 388 recorded in the cadastre of 1778.

Population and landownership in Macerata
| Year | Pop. | No. of landowners |
|---|---|---|
| 1250 | 7,500 (Note: Approximate estimate of Macerata’s population in the late thirteenth century. The town counted 1,800 “hearths” (fuochi), each corresponding to a household averaging four people. Source: Di Stefano (1991), pp. 192–203.) | 1,900 |
| 1350 | 2,000 (Note: Indicative estimate of Macerata’s population after the collapse following the Black Death. From 1,800 “hearths” at the beginning of the fourteenth century, the population fell to 1,000 in 1343 and to 500 in 1348. Source: Paci1986, pp. 9–18.) | — |
| 1450 | 2,200 | — |
| 1550 | 3,600 | 650 |
| 1778 | 12,000 | 388 |
Sources: Ammannati (2020); Di Stefano (1991); Paci (1986).

During the same period—after the collapse that followed the Black Death—Macerata’s population grew considerably: from about 2,200 inhabitants in 1450 to 3,600 in 1550, and to over 12,000 (including the surrounding contado) on the eve of 1800.

The sharp decline in the number of proprietors corresponded to a strong rise in the share of secular land held by the nobility, which reached 85 percent by the late eighteenth century, and to a parallel increase in Church ownership—largely controlled by the same urban patriciates who occupied the upper ranks of ecclesiastical institutions—from 18 percent in the mid-sixteenth century to 40 percent by the end of the eighteenth.

“Together with the spread of the sharecropping contract, still described in notarial terminology as ad soccitam, signs of its evolution—or degeneration—from the original societas into a substantially unbalanced pact at the worker’s expense become evident: the chickens to be brought to the master must be ‘large and good’, the hens ‘fat’; ‘his women must be obliged to do the laundry’; he must cultivate flax and ‘dress it’.”

The concentration of landownership, the system of sharecropping (mezzadria), and the aristocratic monopoly of power—within the broader framework of papal absolutism—produced a long phase of stability but also of social stagnation. (Note: Troscé (1972): “The elements of agricultural progress we had observed in the sixteenth century seem to fade as we move into the next, in evident relation not only to an adverse global conjuncture but also to the closure and crystallisation of the landowning class. Exclusive in directing municipal and provincial administration, that small number of noble families, impermeable to new social inputs throughout the eighteenth century, simultaneously determined complete stagnation in rural progress.”) Only in the early twentieth century did the rural world begin to emerge from this situation: as late as 1911, over sixty percent of Marche’s peasants were still sharecroppers.

== Interpretations ==
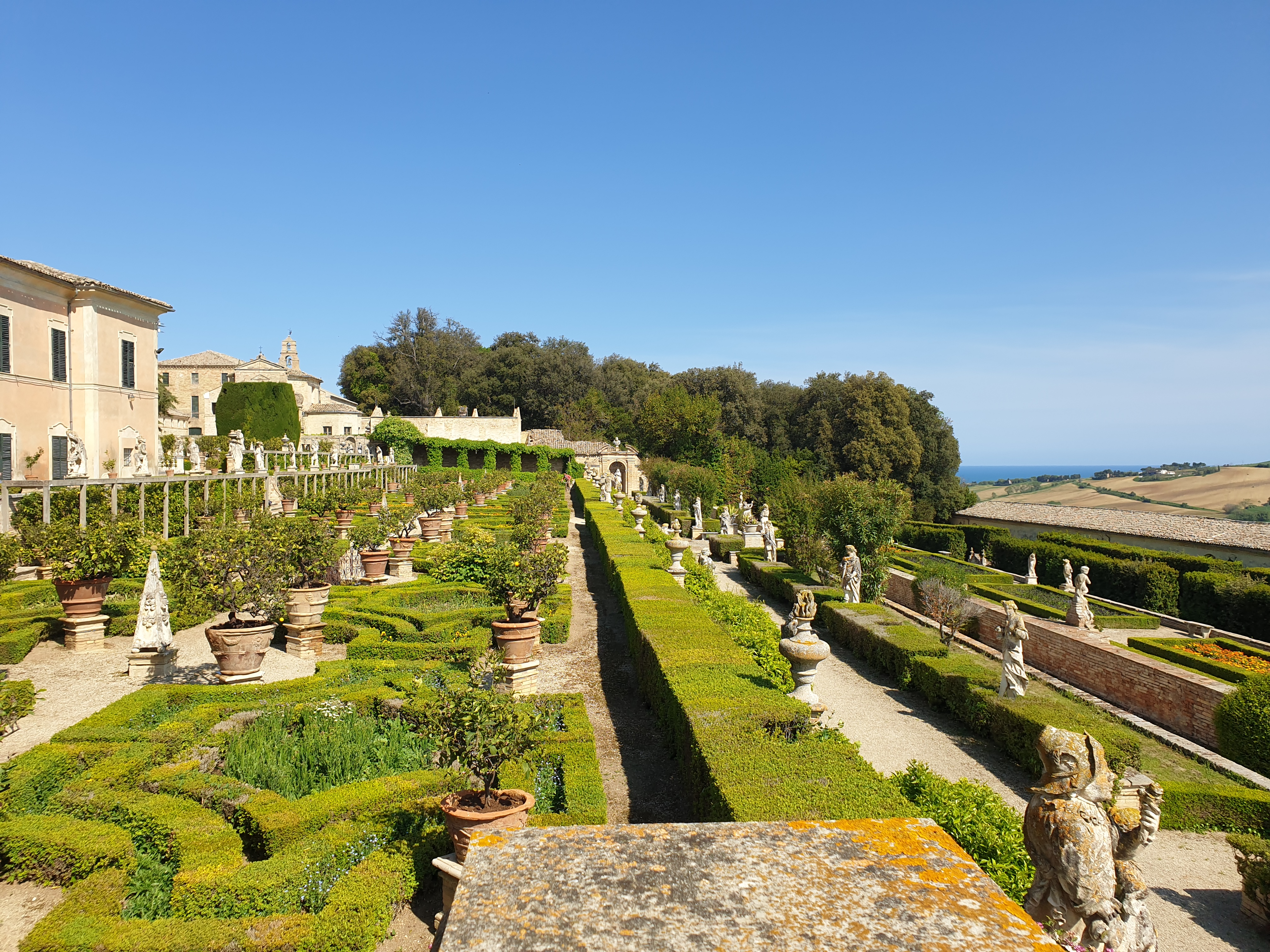
Italian-style gardens of Villa Buonaccorsi near Potenza Picena, an example of an aristocratic country residence.

As the historian Giuseppe Galasso puts it, “The oligarchic bloc has been the historical outcome of particularism and the supporting structure of five or six centuries of Italian social life.”

Historians have examined how these ruling groups formed, tracing their origins to prolonged factional conflicts between cives (high-status citizens) and popular representatives of the guilds of arts and crafts, (Note: Cammarosano (1997) traces the transformation of communal elites during the 13th century, as the nobility of feudal origin merged with mercantile-professional notables; the result was a composite ruling stratum that, by the later thirteenth century, crystallised into a relatively closed civic patriciate. Also Ventura (1964).) who were gradually pushed out of power. This process shows the slow formation of oligarchies within the communes and highlights the essentially recognitive nature of civic nobility: it did not create a new elite so much as give legal form to a social pre-eminence that already existed.

From the sixteenth century onward, aristocratic hegemony gave social life a clearly hierarchical shape. This hierarchy was visible even in the landscape through the spread of the Italian villa, which for civic patriciates came to play much the same role that the castle had for feudal power. (Note: Andrea Palladio synthesised the long-standing city–countryside dichotomy in the unified and harmonious villa house. There the “gentleman of great splendour” might “oversee and adorn his estates and, with the industry and art of agriculture, increase his means [...] while also giving health and strength to the body and great refreshment and consolation to the spirit wearied by the agitations of the city, so as to be able to devote himself quietly to letters and contemplation.”)

Many people—both in the countryside and in the towns—came to depend on powerful families for protection, work and advancement. This created clientelist networks that recalled aspects of feudal society, even though they operated within civic institutions rather than a strictly feudal framework.

The resulting high degree of social integration helped to overcome the sharp fractures and conflicts of the communal age, at the cost of the establishment of a hierarchical and tightly regulated order. In later periods, these small aristocratic polities also retained a strong commitment to legality and political deliberation, together with a relative degree of equality within the patrician order.

== Comparison with other Italian and European civic nobilities ==
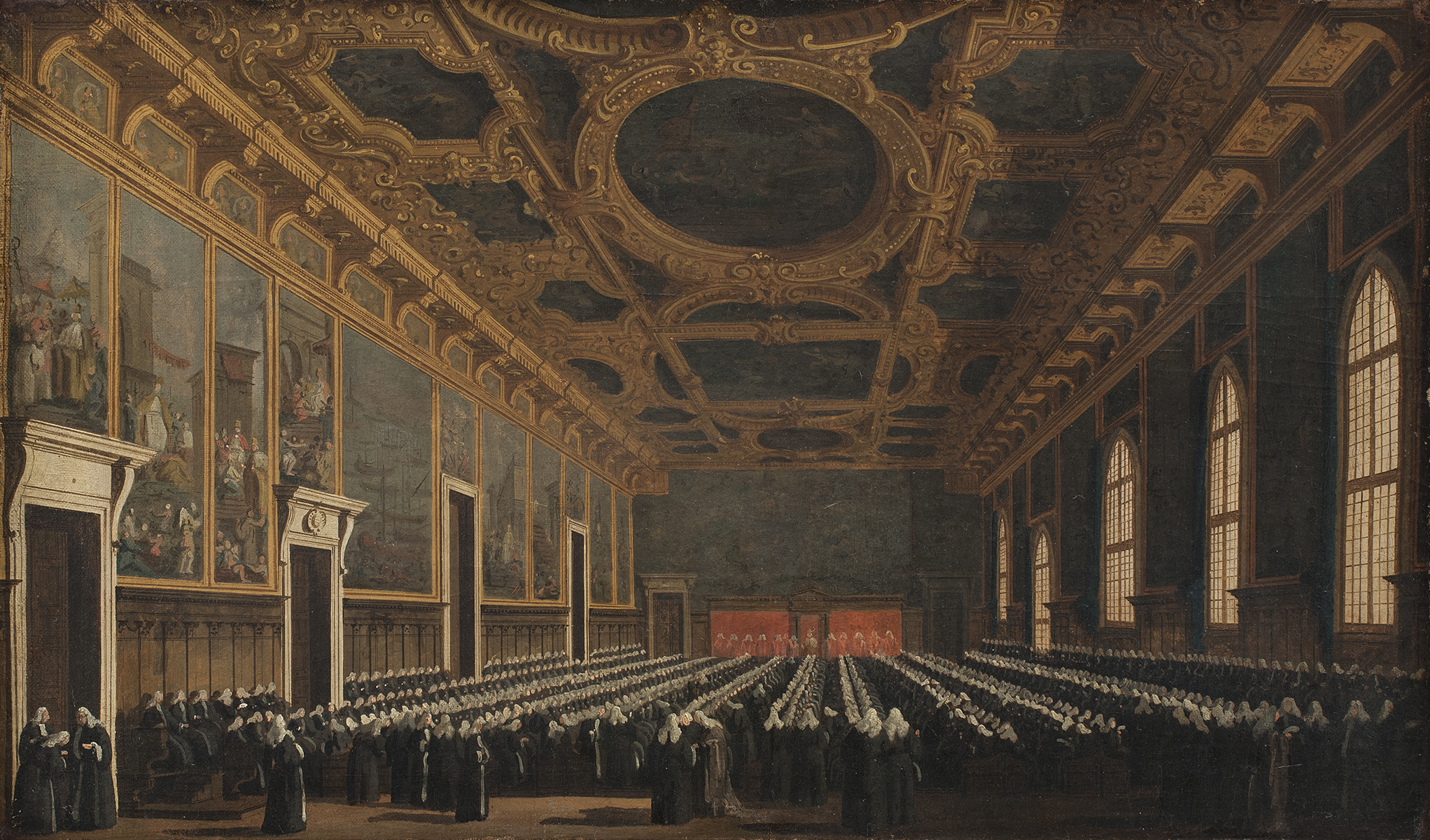
Canaletto, The Maggior Consiglio (1763), view of the interior of the Doge’s Palace in Venice.

The Marchigian civic nobility formed part of a wider system of urban elites which, between the late Middle Ages and the early modern period, governed many Italian cities and gradually consolidated hereditary political and social prerogatives. These groups—often described as “civic nobilities”, “decurional nobilities” or “urban patriciates”—are seen as some of the most characteristic expressions of Italian aristocracy, rooted in citizenship and in the exercise of municipal magistracies.

Seen from this angle, civic nobility appears as a “republican” form of aristocracy that linked medieval and early modern modes of urban government. In the history of elites it is a typical feature of communal Italy, where active citizenship and hereditary access to civic offices often counted more than lineage or seigneurial investiture alone, outlining a “second path” to aristocracy alongside, but distinct from, models based on territorial lordship.

=== Civic nobilities in early modern Europe ===
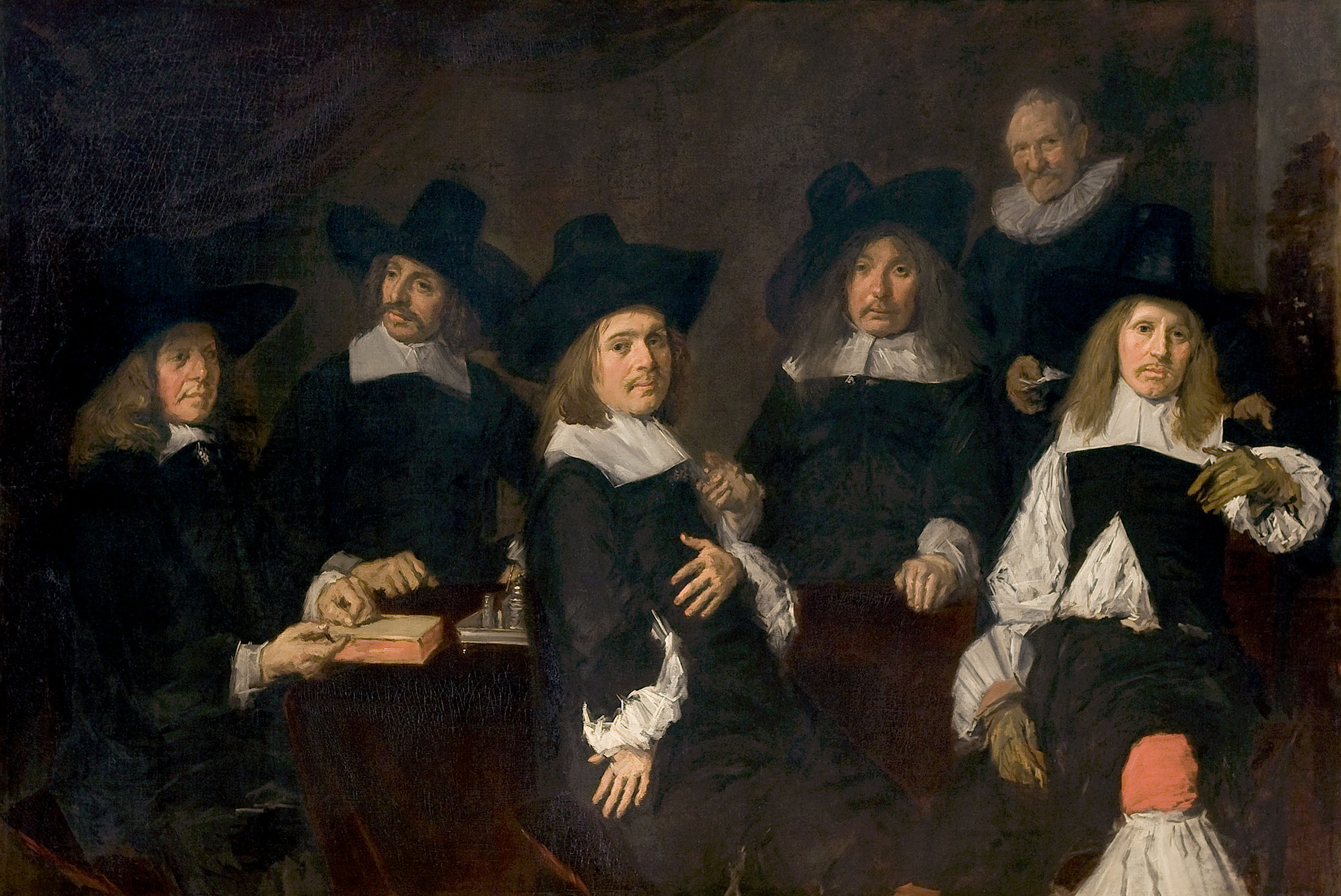
Frans Hals, Regents of the Old Men's Alms House (1664), Haarlem. Group of Dutch regenten, members of an urban governing board, a typical example of the civic elites of the Dutch Republic.

Elsewhere in Europe, even where strong urban elites and administrative groups existed, the lack of the jurisdictional autonomy typical of the Italian medieval commune—often extending to the surrounding countryside and, in the Papal States, supported by a relatively weak and delegation-oriented central authority—limited the development of comparable urban patriciates.

This produced different outcomes: municipal elites without formal noble status (aldermen in England, regenten in the Low Countries); only partly hereditary civic ranks (Patriziat in German free cities); ennoblement linked to royal grants, tightly controlled by the monarchy and more personal than familial (noblesse de robe in France). In Spain, urban regidores formed hereditary and venal oligarchies, closely subordinated to the Crown and without real jurisdictional autonomy over rural districts, where hidalgos and urban notables merged into a broad and socially unequal nobility.

These patterns can be summarised in comparative form as follows:

The European comparison
| Area | Germany (imperial cities) | Low Countries / Flanders | France | Spain | England | March of Ancona |
|---|---|---|---|---|---|---|
| Essential features | Mercantile Stadtadel/Patriziat co-opted into councils; autonomy in free imperial cities. | Urban patriciates tied to trade and guilds; strong mercantile profile. | Noblesse de robe: public offices (often venal) as a route to ennoblement. | Regidores in urban oligarchies; fusion with hidalgos and rural nobility. | Aldermen and urban notables; civic prestige but separate from the titled peerage. | Civic nobilities with hereditary access to municipal office and jurisdiction over the surrounding countryside. |
| Differences vs March of Ancona | Sharper separation from feudal nobility; no jurisdiction over the contado; heredity less institutionalised. | More “bourgeois” character; no jurisdiction over the contado; noble recognition often absent. | Nobility of administrative–judicial service; strong monarchical dependence; individual ennoblement, not linked to territorial jurisdiction. | Weaker municipal continuity; stronger royal control. | Absence of a structured hereditary urban patriciate. | – |

=== Other Italian civic nobilities ===
A number of cases from different parts of the Italian peninsula help to situate the March within a broader spectrum of civic-nobility models.

In the Republic of Venice the patriciate formed a closed public-law body, defined by hereditary membership in the Maggior Consiglio after the Serrata of 1297. From it derived the election of the Doge, access to the Senate (Pregadi), and the main magistracies. As the sovereign body of government, it guaranteed the stability of the aristocratic republic for centuries and guided policy over the maritime empire and the mainland.

In the Republic of Genoa noble families were organised into alberghi, unions of mercantile lineages that shared power in alternation between “old” and “new” nobles. The patriciate—the peak of the mercantile estate—monopolised the dogeship, boards and magistracies, directing the republic’s financial and maritime policy. The 1528 reform unified “old” and “new” into a closed patriciate structured by alberghi, created the Great Council and the biennial Doge, and firmly consolidated the oligarchic regime.

In the Republic of Lucca—restored as an independent republic in 1369—a patrician order formed around the college of the Anziani, with a narrow ruling group that, already between the fourteenth and sixteenth centuries, concentrated access to the main magistracies. The 1628 reform turned this into a “closed” oligarchic republic, establishing an official roll of patricians (Libro d’Oro) based on census and genealogy, in force until the nineteenth century. The patriciate ensured continuity of republican government, steering economic policies, especially in the silk sector.

In the Republic of Florence, between the late Middle Ages and the early modern period, the civic ruling group—centred on guilds, the Priorate and the councils—effectively acted as a decurional nobility of the city; through rules of access and rotation (imborsazioni) it helped fix the oligarchic structure of communal and republican institutions, up to the formal “closure” of 1532 under the Medici, which crystallised recruitment and anchored it in the institutions of the principate.

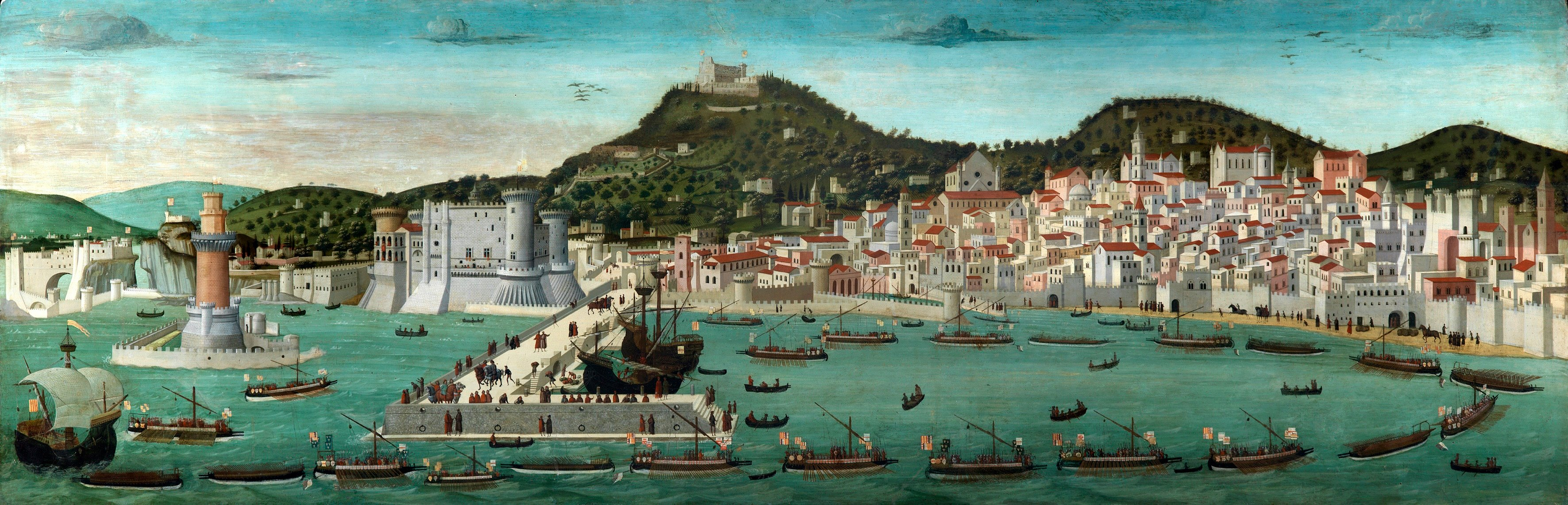
View of Naples in the late fifteenth century (the so-called Tavola Strozzi).

In the Kingdom of Naples the città regie were governed by a nobility described as civica or decurionale, organised into urban seggi. It differed from feudal nobility but shared its social rank and often its origins. The seggi formed the core of the capital’s political–administrative representation: they elected the civic eletti, apportioned taxes and burdens, directed spending and public works; down to the Napoleonic era, inscription in a seggio remained a prerequisite for access to the principal urban magistracies.

In the Duchy of Milan the body of Decurioni formed an administrative civic nobility—a municipal organ consolidated under Spanish rule and confirmed under Austrian rule—representing the community in tax apportionment, provisioning and public works, the defence of statutes and privileges, and the presentation of shortlists for municipal offices. In the Habsburg period, and then under the Kingdom of Lombardy–Venetia, this standing was recognised as civil nobility.

Compared with these models, the civic nobility of the Papal March shows distinctive features. It amounted to a hybrid between city and fief, (Note: The hybridisation, due to the area’s predominantly rural character—while allowing for the markedly mercantile orientation of the Republic of Ancona—marked the inland communes from the outset: landholding underwent continual reshuffling under urban and maiores hegemony, a stratum which, while varying in composition and absorbing feudal elements to different degrees, long maintained primacy over cities and their rural districts. See Pirani (2014).) in which urban power rested on landownership and on jurisdiction over the contadi, yet within a political framework dominated by papal sovereignty. The result was a particular balance between municipal autonomy and central authority that allowed local elites to retain functions of government, representation and jurisdiction for several centuries. (Note: Zenobi (1994, p. 232): “In the second half of the seventeenth century the Jesuit Domenico Gamberti [...] undertook a general survey of Italy’s noble families with a striking result: the bulk of the families identified, almost 87% of the total, belonged to an area between Como and Volterra, within which the nobility of the Papal States alone exceeded 41%.”)

== The houses in the cities ==
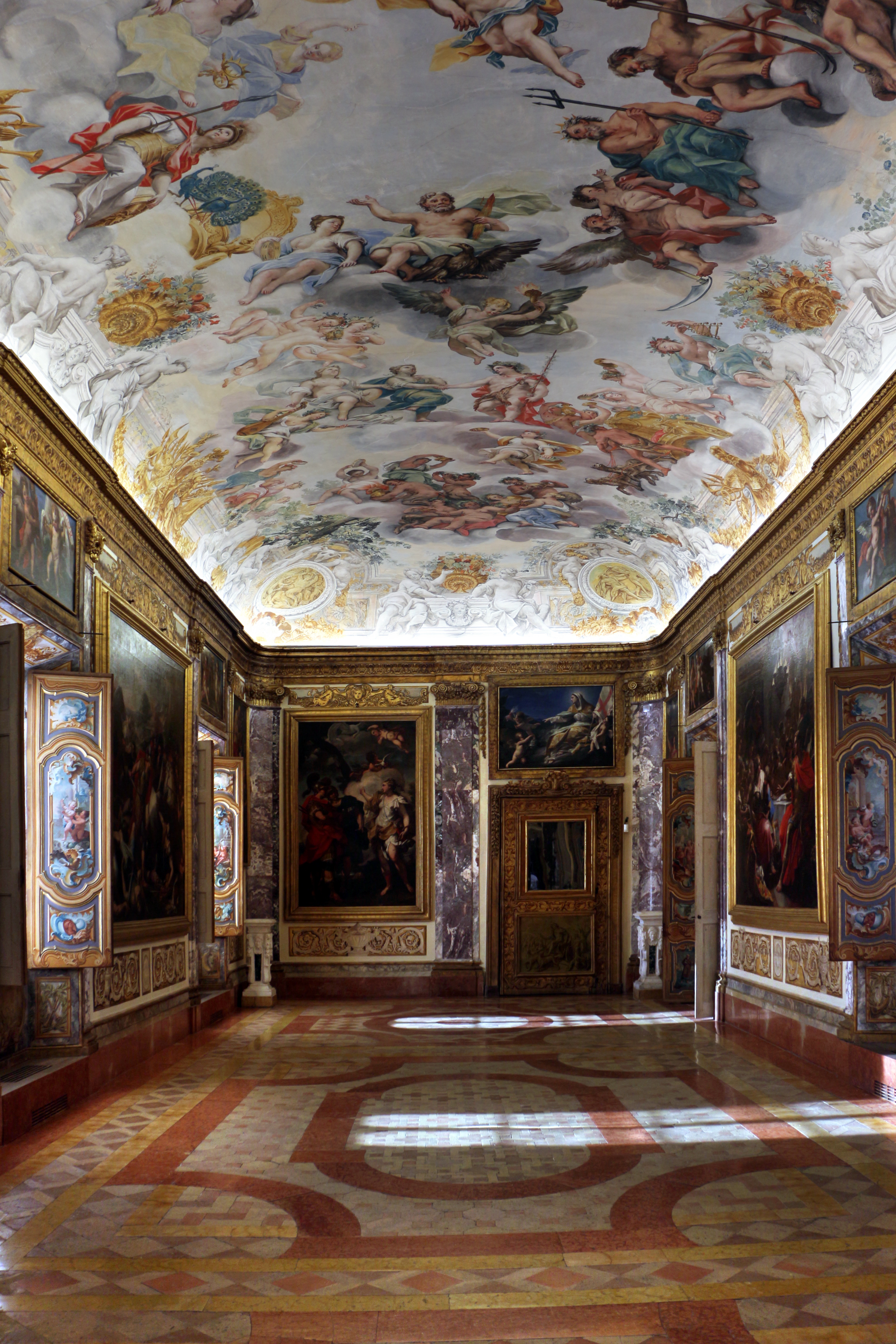
The Aeneid hall of Palazzo Buonaccorsi (Macerata), the historic residence of the Buonaccorsi family.

The houses owed their prominence to the age of their lineage, their marriage networks, and a reach that often extended across several cities and towns. As the governing elite, they steered civic institutions toward largely seigneurial arrangements, echoing, as historian Jones notes, an early feature of the Italian commune.

“In form or in substance, the political history of the communes—as much as their social history—was a history of the leading families, of civic lineages and, increasingly, of rural-county or feudo-urban houses. […] Born seigneurial, such the communes essentially remained in the majority of cases.”

— Jones (1980)

The internal organisation of the nobility in the twenty-two cities of the March of Ancona can be summarised as follows:

- In the major cities—Ancona, Camerino, Fano, Recanati, Osimo, Corinaldo, Numana, Filottrano, and Montecchio (modern-day Treia)—the general council was composed only of nobles, with the complete exclusion of the popolari.
- In all cities the consiglio di credenza (or di cernita) was composed exclusively of nobles, except in Cingoli where it was reserved to nobles and citizens, still excluding the popolari.
- The magistracy was reserved to nobles in Ancona, Fermo, Camerino, Ascoli, Fano, Recanati, Macerata, Osimo, Tolentino, Ripatransone, Corinaldo, Montalboddo (modern-day Ostra), Montecchio, Filottrano, and Numana.
- In all the cities—the above plus Jesi, Fabriano, San Severino, Cingoli, Montalto, and Matelica—the office of Gonfaloniere (head of the magistracy and thus of the community) was reserved to nobles.
- In Ancona, Camerino, Ascoli, and Macerata the nobility was divided into two or more ranks based on the seniority of a family’s aggregation: the highest of these, styled “patricians”, enjoyed the most elevated offices, including exclusive participation in the consiglio di cernita.

The lists linked below are reconstructive and not exhaustive; they are intended to show the composition of the ruling elites through the families included.

Link to the list of houses in the cities (Italian): it:Nobiltà civica nella Marca pontificia#Le casate nelle città

Note: Detailed family rosters are maintained on it.wiki to preserve local nomenclature and archival attributions.

== The houses in the terre ==
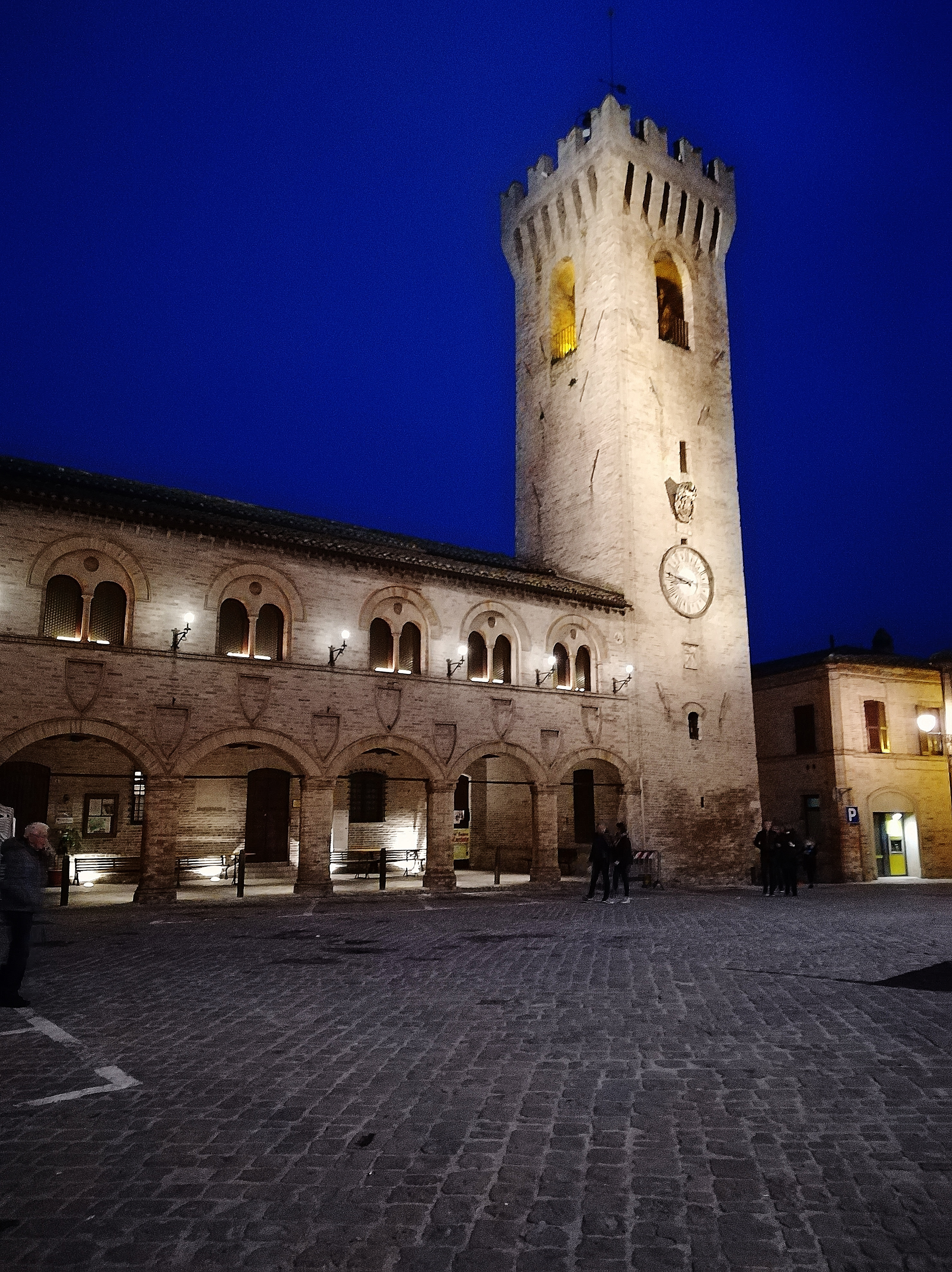
Palazzo dei Priori in Montelupone, the historic seat of the community’s magistracies.

The lineages listed below are those recorded among the nobility of twenty-four terre of the Papal March, as identified by the historian Bandino Giacomo Zenobi. Drawing on statutory legislation, he shows that these centres underwent class closure. Using eighteenth-century archival sources—bussoli (ballot boxes used for sortition) and council records—he identifies 365 lineages (Note: Comprising 513 families, for an estimated total of about 2,500 individuals, within a population of the Papal March that by the late eighteenth century amounted to roughly half a million. See F. Corridore, La popolazione dello Stato Romano (1656–1901), Rome, 1906.) that participated hereditarily in local government.

“In each of these cases (i.e., where class closures had occurred) [...] nobility was characterised and identified by hereditary participation in an office, or set of offices, from which the popolari were excluded. And it was precisely this exclusion that gave the organ its aristocratic character [...] it was therefore in the exercise of the functions connected to such organs that civic nobility came to identify and recognise itself.”

— Zenobi (1976)

The lists linked below are reconstructive and not exhaustive; they are intended to show the composition of the ruling elites through the families included.

Link to the list of houses in the terre (Italian): it:Nobiltà civica nella Marca pontificia#Le casate nelle terre

Note: Detailed family rosters are maintained on it.wiki to preserve local nomenclature and archival attributions.

== See also ==
- Papal States
- Italian nobility
- Patrician (post-Roman Europe)
- Venetian nobility
- Urban history
- Marche
