= Palazzo Pianetti =

Coordinates: 43.5214°N 13.2426°E

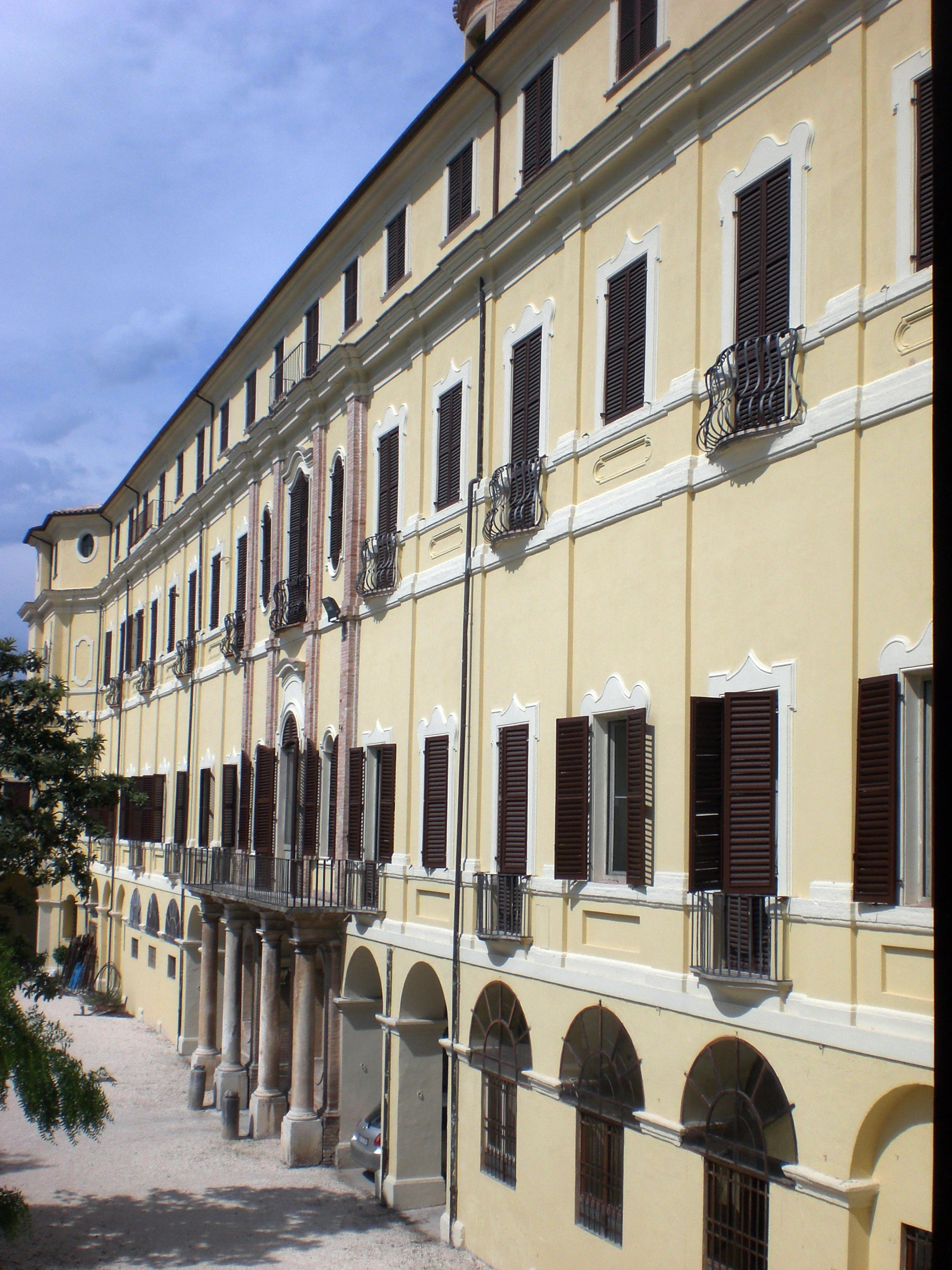
- The facade of the palace garden
- Location: Via XV Settembre 10, Jesi, Italy
- Type: Art museum, Historic site

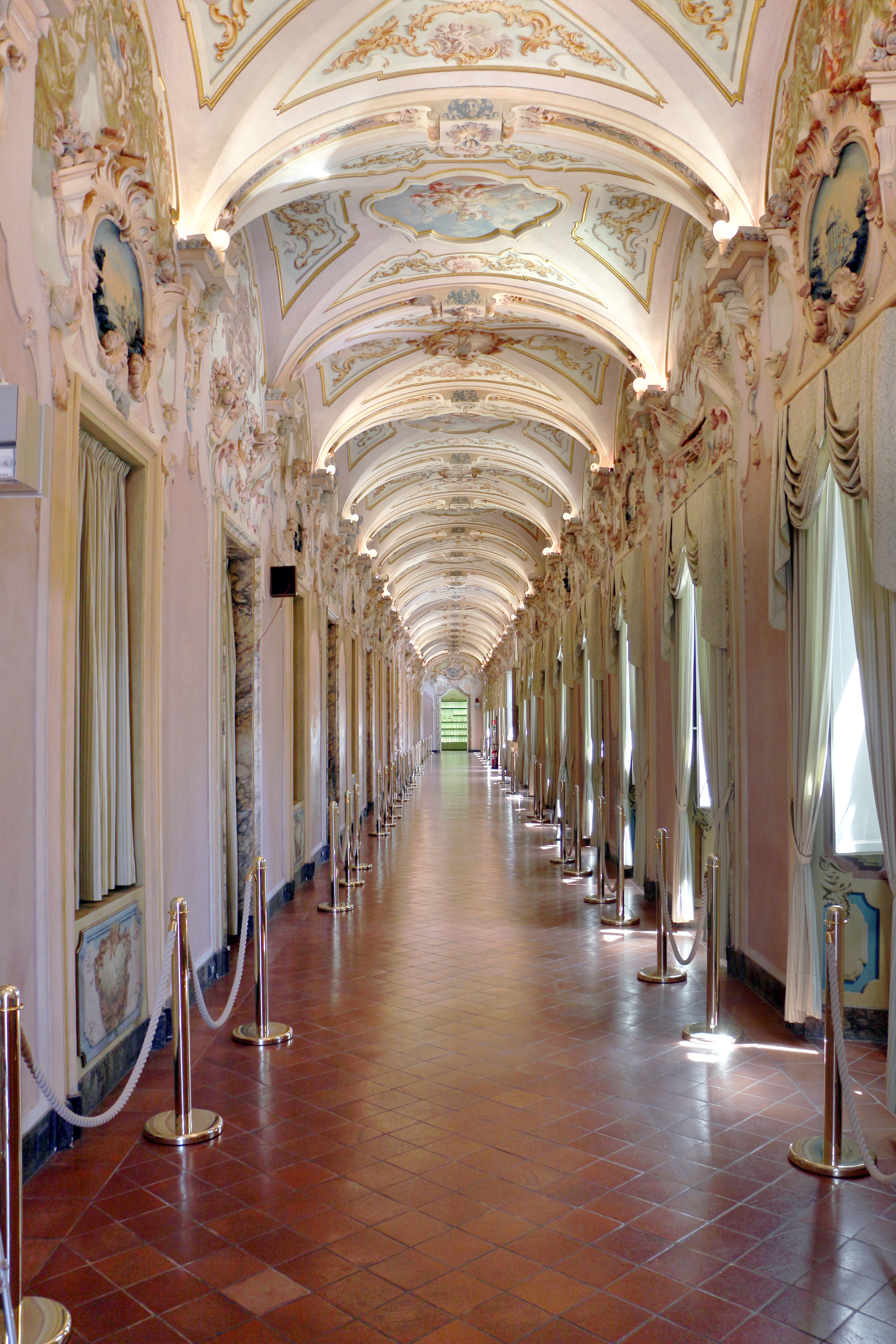
The gallery

The Palazzo Pianetti or Pianetti Tesei is a Rococo palace in the town of Jesi, region of Marche, Italy; it is presently used as the Civic Museum and exhibition space for Jesi.

== History ==
The present structure was built in 1730, based on designs of Cardolo Maria Pianetti. The elaborate interior decorations with stucco and paint depict a variety of subjects and cycles. They include frescoes on stories of the Aeneid by Placido Lazzarini, the second floor stanza was decorated by the Florentine Bandinelli.

== Pinacoteca ==
The adjacent building houses the civic picture gallery or Pinacoteca Civica.

The most important works in the collection is a group of works by Lorenzo Lotto, completed 1512-1535 for the churches of San Francesco al Monte and San Floriano; these include the large altar-piece of the Deposition (1512); The Madonna of the Roses (1526), the three predellas of the altarpiece of St. Lucy, telling the story of her martyrdom (1532); and the Visitation (1531-35).

As well as the above-mentioned works, the gallery contains paintings by:

- Cristoforo Roncalli
- Carlo Cignani
- Giacomo del Po
- Cristoforo Unterberger
- Alessandro Tiarini
- Antonio Sarti
- Pietro Paolo Agabiti
- Giuliano Presutti
- Francesco Trevisani
- Carlo Maratta
- Domenico Luigi Valeri
- Giovanni Battista Langetti
- Guercino
- Gerolamo Marchesi da Cotignola
- Nicola di Maestro Antonio da Ancona
- Francesco Albani
- Orfeo Tamburi
- Renato Guttuso
- Valeriano Trubbiani
