= Orfeo Tamburi =

Italian painter

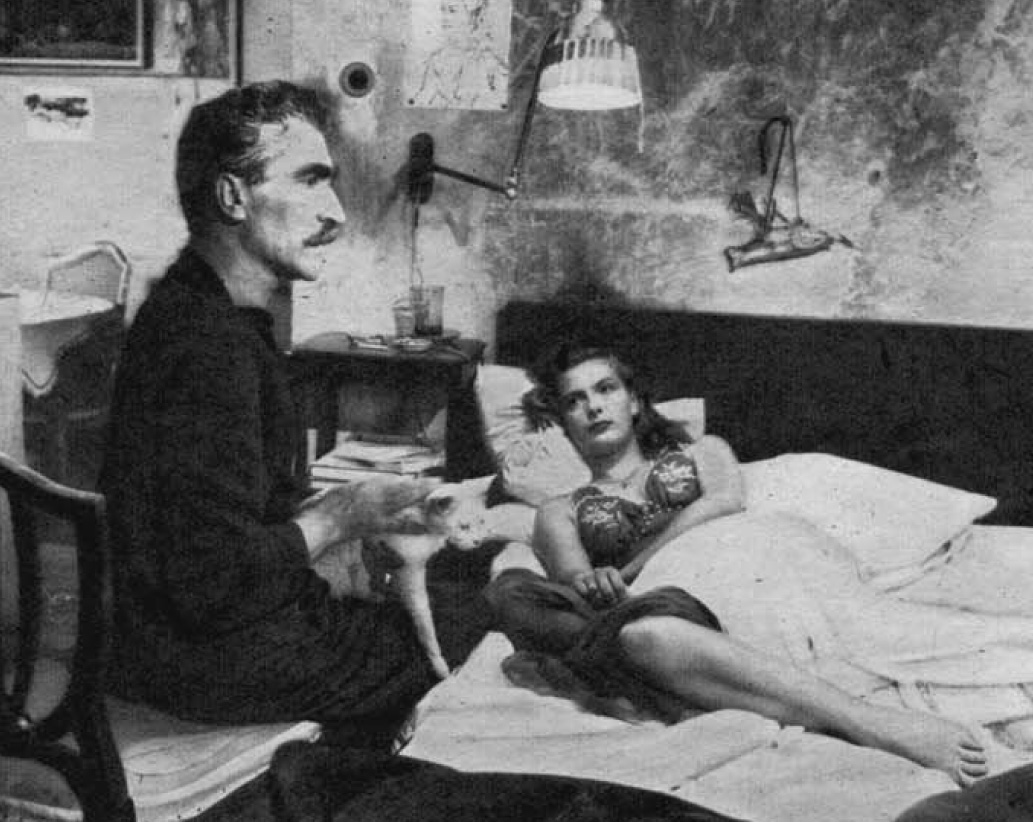
Tamburi in the Rossellini film

Orfeo Tamburi (1910–1994) was an Italian painter and scenic designer.

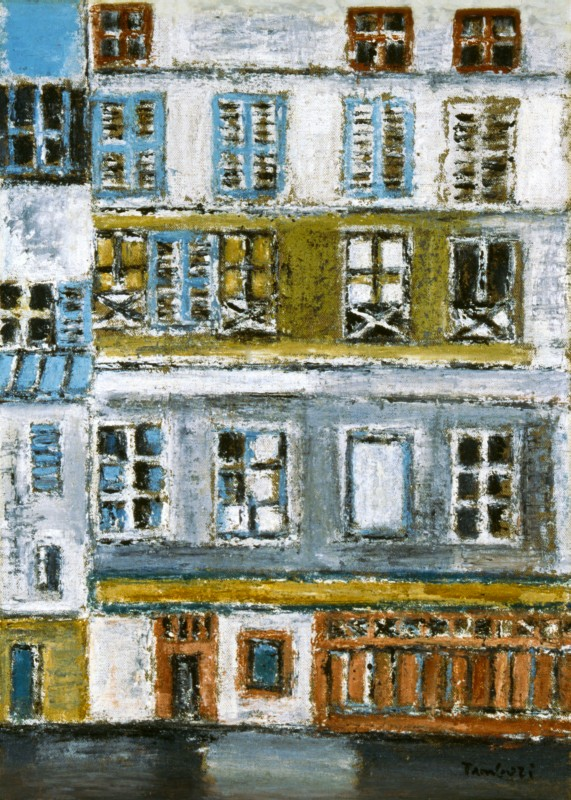
Tetti a Parigi (Fondazione Cariplo)

== Biography ==
He was born in Jesi, and graduated from the local Istituto Tecnico in 1926. He was awarded in 1928 a stipend to study in Rome, at the Accademia di Belle Arti di Roma, where he met Ennio Flaiano and Vincenzo Cardarelli. He soon moved to Paris, where he was influenced by Cezanne. He remained in Paris during World War II. He was active as a scenic designer. In 1941 he designed figures and scenography for the La sacra rappresentazione di Abrham e Isaac by Feo Belcari. After the war, he travelled extensively in Europe. In 1951, he participated as an actor in the segment of L’invidia of a picture titled The Seven Deadly Sins by Roberto Rossellini. In the 1960s, he travelled to the United States, and gained a commission to photograph some American cities for the journal Fortune. In 1964, he donated many of his works to the Pinacoteca Civica di Jesi. The town established a prize dedicated to his mother. In 1971, he was awarded a gold medal for Merit for the Culture by the Italian president, and in 1975, a Premio Internazionale “Città Eterna” in Roma. He died in Ermont in 1994.
