= Jesi =

- Comune
- Città di Jesi; City of Jesi
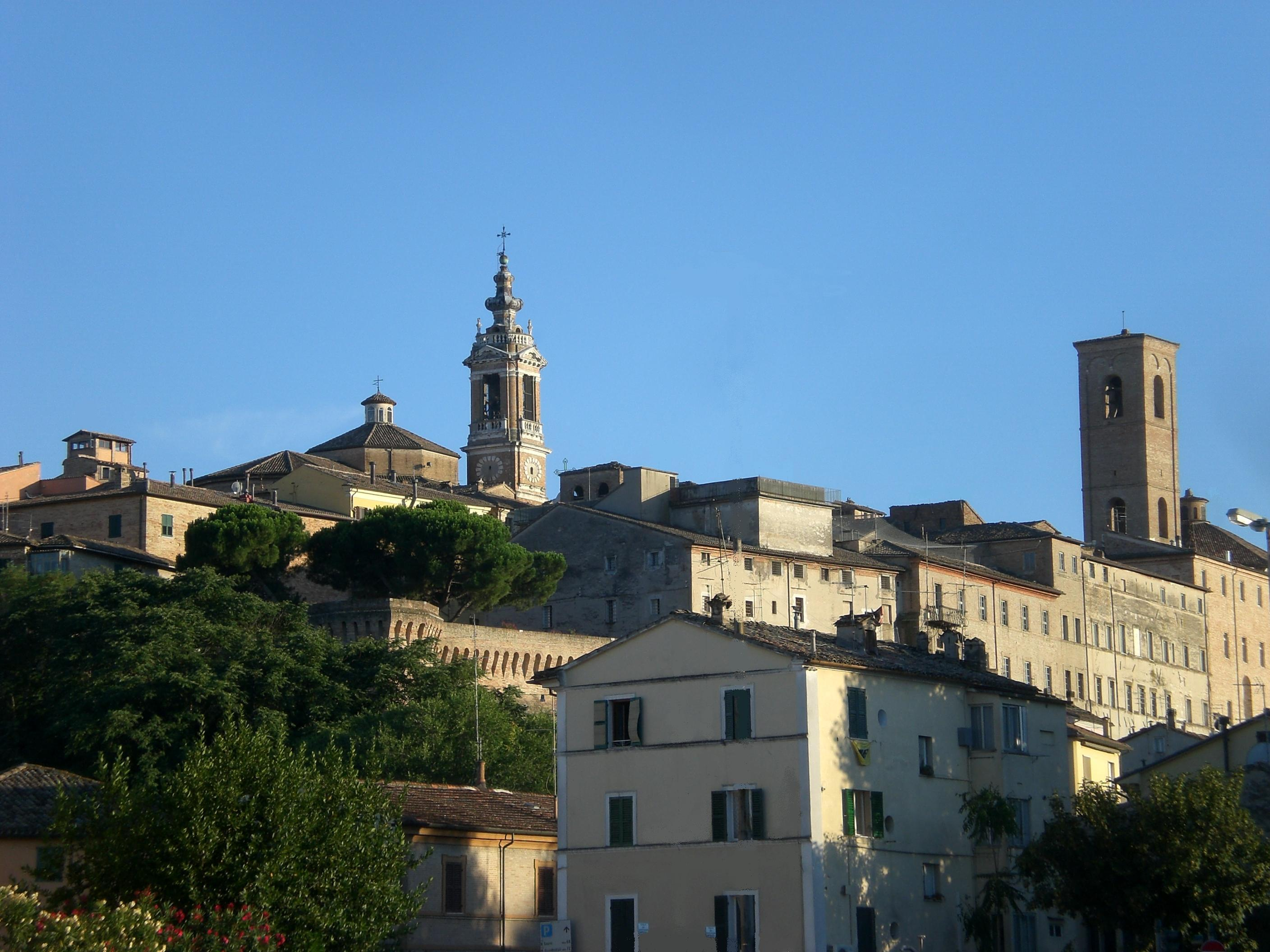

- Coat of arms

- Location within Italy Location within Marche
- Coordinates: 43°31′25″N 13°14′21″E
- Country: Italy
- Region: Marche
- Province: Ancona (AN)
- Frazioni: Mazzangrugno, Castelrosino, Tabano, Santa Lucia

Government
  - Mayor: Lorenzo Fiordelmondo (PD; left)

Area
  - Total: 107 km^{2} (41 sq mi)
- Elevation: 97 m (318 ft)

Population (31 August 2017)
  - Total: 40,251
  - Density: 376/km^{2} (974/sq mi)
- Demonym: Jesini
- Time zone: UTC+1 (CET)
  - Summer (DST): UTC+2 (CEST)
- Postal code: 60035
- Dialing code: 0731
- Patron saint: Saint Septimius
- Saint day: September 22
- Website: comune.jesi.an.it/IlComune/

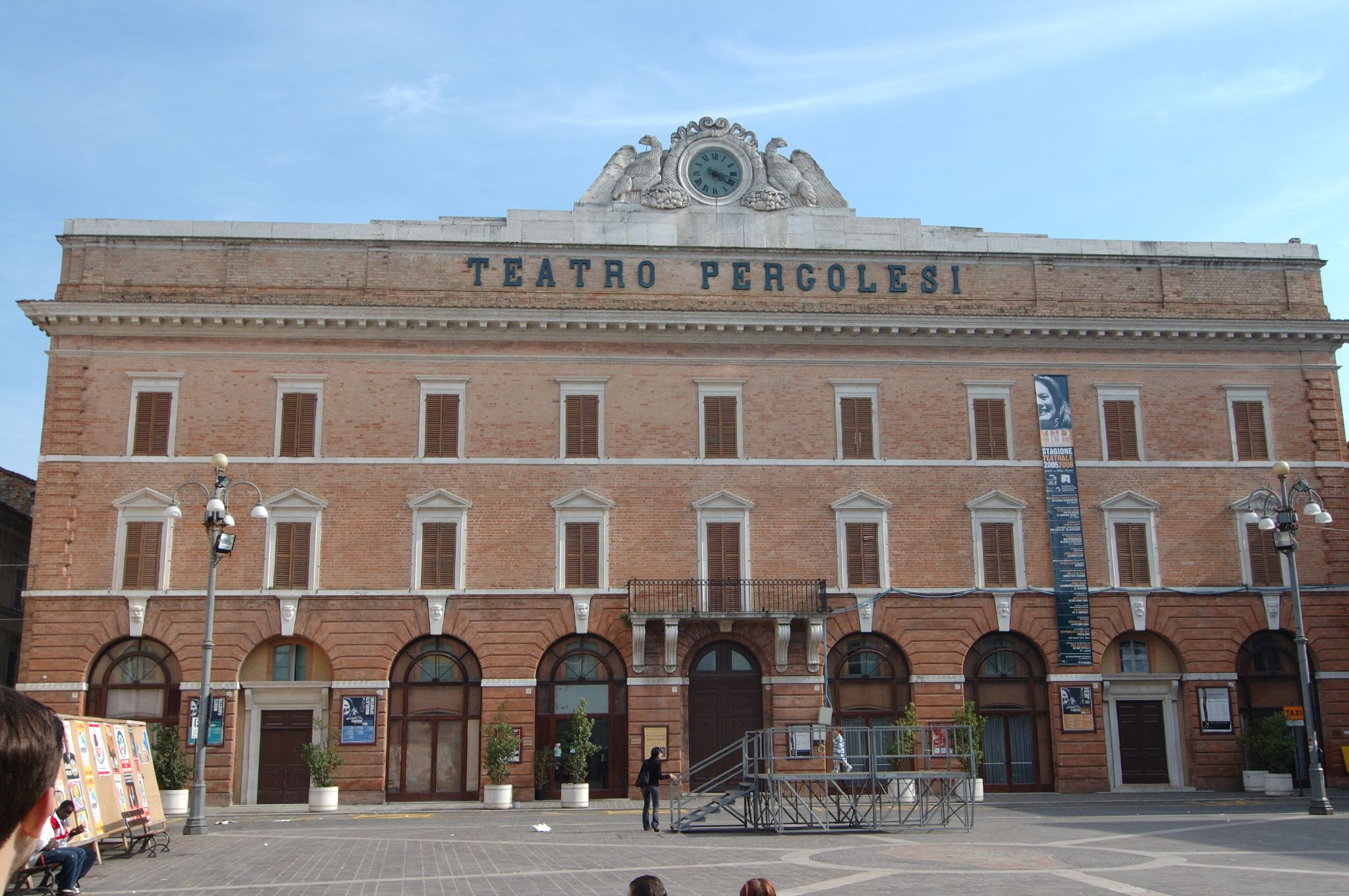
Teatro Pergolesi

Jesi (Italian: [ˈjɛːzi]) is a comune (municipality) in the province of Ancona, in the Italian region of Marche.

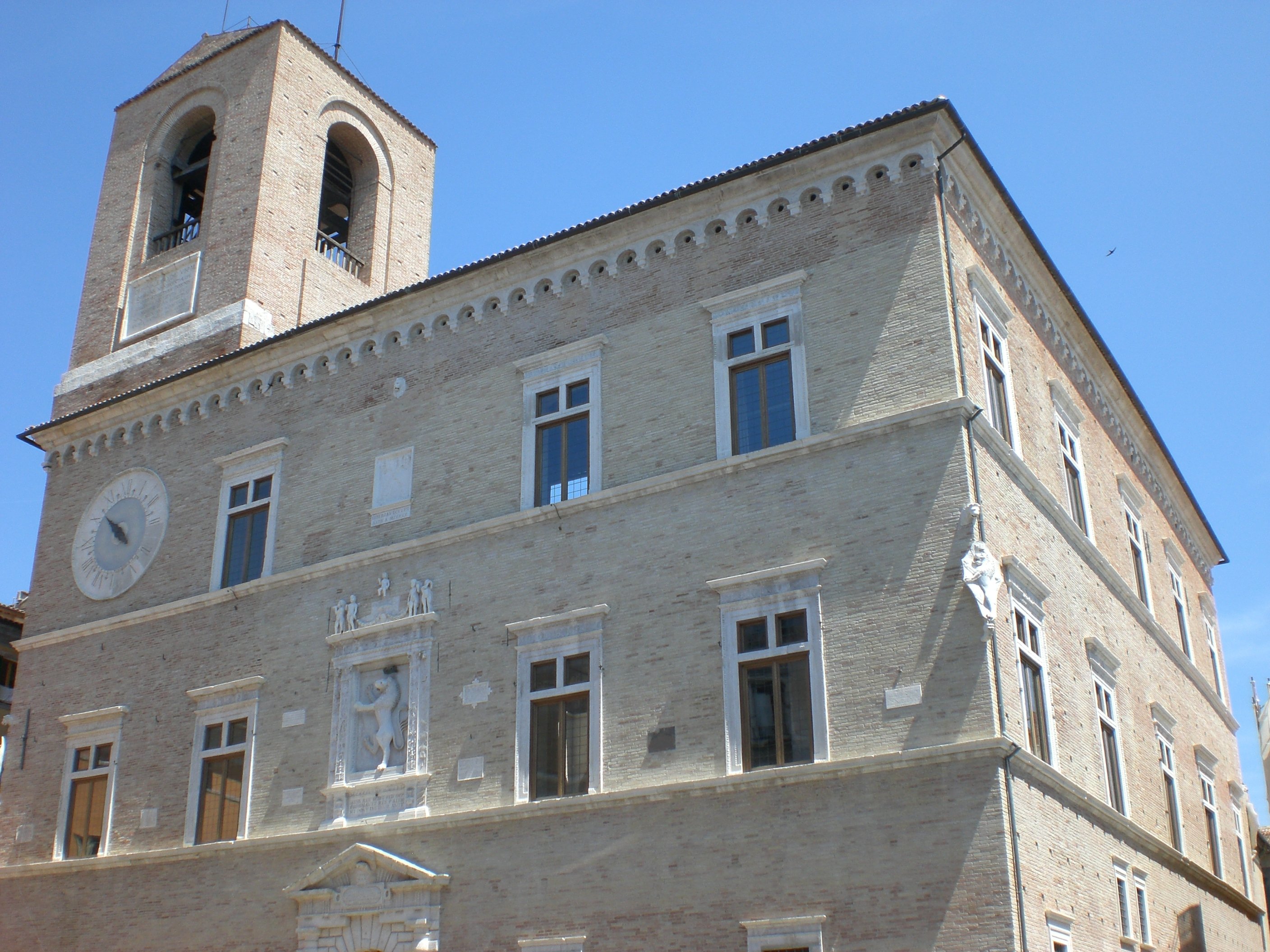
Palazzo della Signoria

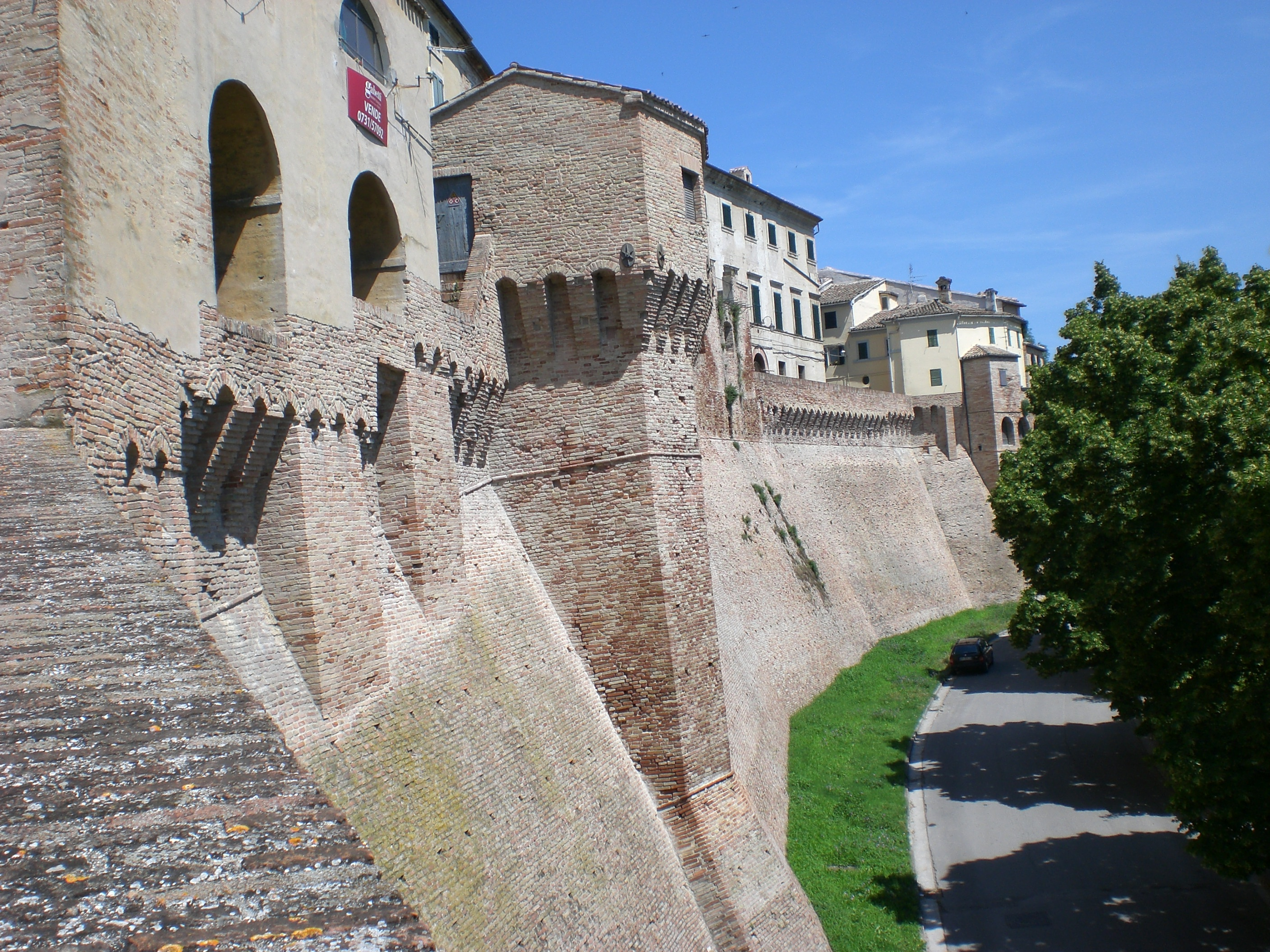
View of the 14th century walls

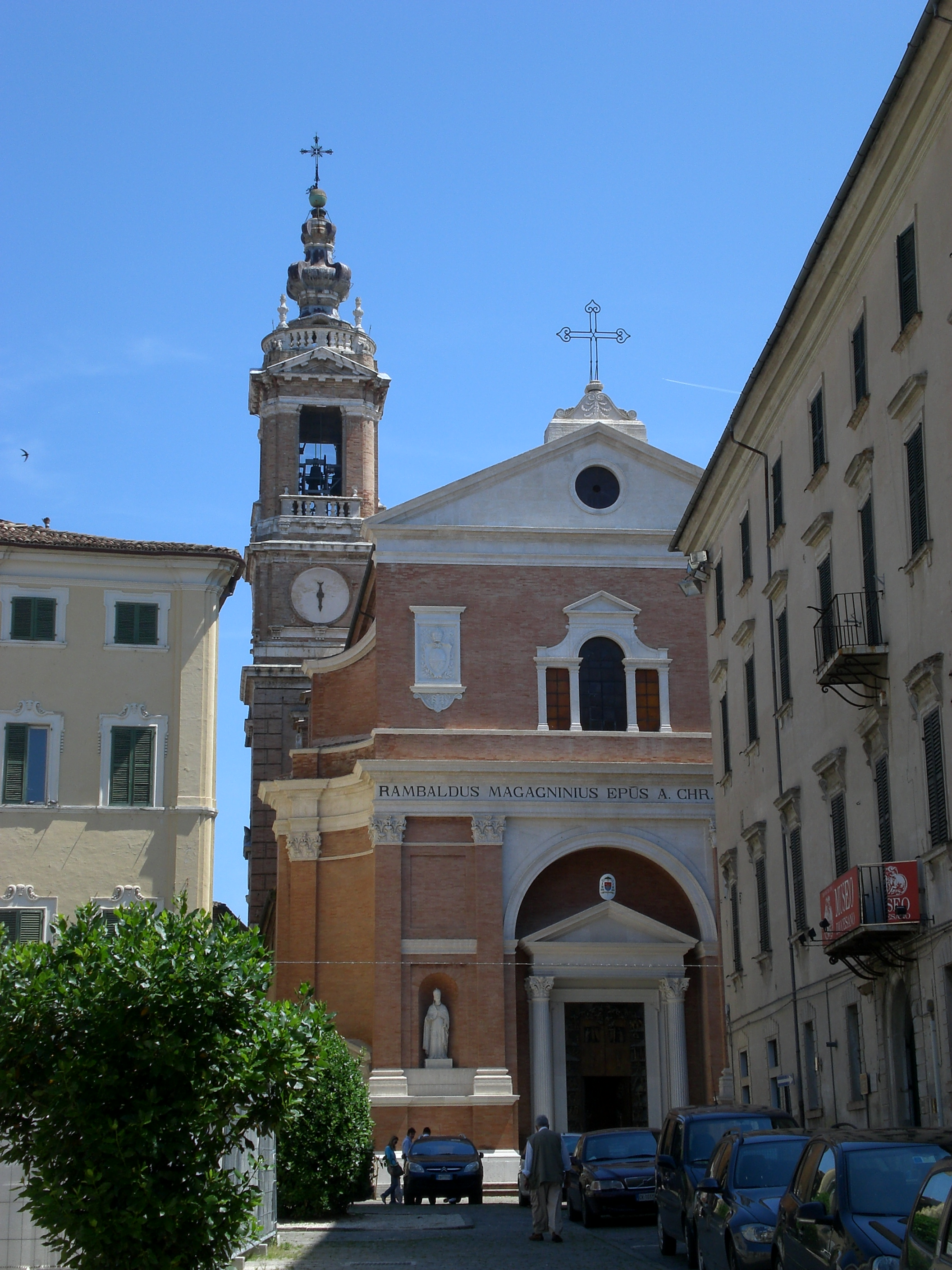
Cathedral (Duomo)

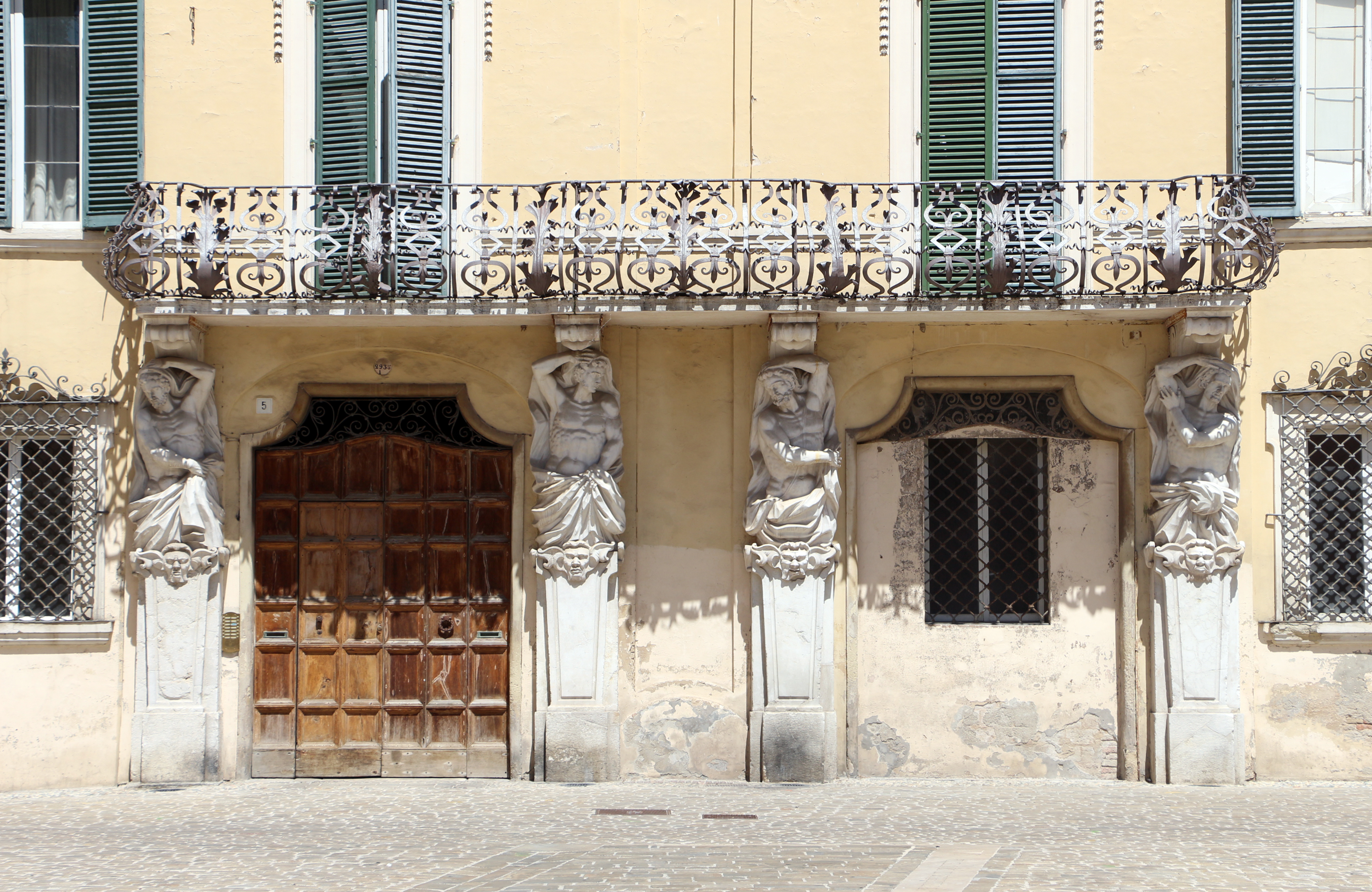
Palazzo Balleani

It is an important industrial and artistic center in the floodplain on the left (north) bank of the Esino river, 17 kilometres (11 mi) before its mouth on the Adriatic Sea.

== History ==
Jesi (Iesi) was one of the last towns of the Umbri when, in the 4th century BC, the Senones Gauls invaded the area and ousted them. They turned it into a stronghold against the Piceni. In 283 BC the Senones were defeated by the Romans. Jesi in 247 BC became a colonia civium romanorum with the name of Aesis.

During the fall of the Western Roman Empire, Jesi was ravaged by the troops of Odoacer (476 AD) and again in 493 by the Ostrogoths of Theodoric the Great. After the Gothic War, Italy became part of the Byzantine Empire, and Jesi became one of the main centers of the new rulers, and a diocese seat. In 751 it was sacked by the Lombard troops of Aistulf, and later was a Carolingian imperial city.

Since 1130, it was an independent commune, gradually expanding its control over its surrounding agrarian region. In December 1194 the future Holy Roman Emperor Frederick II was born here: he later made Jesi a "Royal City". In the 14th century it was captured by the Papal vicar Filippo Simonetti, then by Galeotto I Malatesta (1347–1351), by Braccio da Montone in 1408, and by Francesco I Sforza, who turned it into his family's main stronghold in the Marche. In 1447 Jesi was bought by the Papal States.

From the Reformation to the Napoleonic invasions, the city was effectively governed by a civic nobility, an urban patriciate that enjoyed broad jurisdictional autonomy over local justice and administration.

== Main sights ==
=== Religious buildings ===
- Jesi cathedral: duomo built in the 13th-15th centuries. The façade and the Latin cross interior are modern.
- San Floriano: 18th century convent.
- San Marco: Gothic, 13th-century church just outside the old city centre. The interior has a nave and two aisles, with a 14th-century fresco by an anonymous Rimini painter.
- Santa Maria delle Grazie: 15th-century church with 17th-century belltower.
- San Nicolò: 13th-century church with Romanesque apse and a Gothic portal.

=== Secular buildings ===
- The 14th century walls, built following the line of the Roman ones and mostly rebuilt in the 15th century by Baccio Pontelli and Francesco di Giorgio Martini. Six towers remain today.
- Palazzo della Signoria, built in 1486–1498 by Francesco di Giorgio Martini. The angular tower was elevated in 1661 and received a dome, but crumbled down a few years later. Notable is the interior courtyard, with two orders of loggias, partially designed by Andrea Sansovino from 1519.
- Palazzo Balleani, an example of local Baroque architecture, built from 1720 and designed by Francesco Ferruzzi. The façade has a characteristic balcony supported by four atlases (1723). The interior has precious gilded stucco decoration.
- Palazzo Pianetti: Rococo palace. The wide façade has exactly one hundred windows, while the interior has a noteworthy giardino all'italiana. The palace houses the city's civic art gallery, with a series of paintings by the Venetian artist Lorenzo Lotto.
- Palazzo Ricci, finished in 1547. The diamond-like bricks of the façade are inspired to famous Palazzo dei Diamanti in Ferrara.
- Teatro Pergolesi, built in 1790.

== Notable people ==
- Frederick II, Holy Roman Emperor
- Giancarlo Alessandrini
- Giuseppe Balducci, composer
- Alice Bellagamba
- Dionisio Cimarelli
- Angelo Colocci
- Elisa Di Francisca
- Giancarlo Falappa
- Virna Lisi
- Antonio Magini-Coletti
- Roberto Mancini
- Valeria Moriconi
- Giovanni Battista Pergolesi
- Paolo Polidori
- Rafael Sabatini
- Gabriele Tinti
- Giovanna Trillini
- Valentina Vezzali

== International relations ==
Jesi is twinned with:

- Lucera, Italy (since 1970)
- Mayenne, France
- Waiblingen, Germany
- Galați, Romania (since 2003)

== See also ==
- Roman Catholic Diocese of Jesi
