= Angelo Colocci =

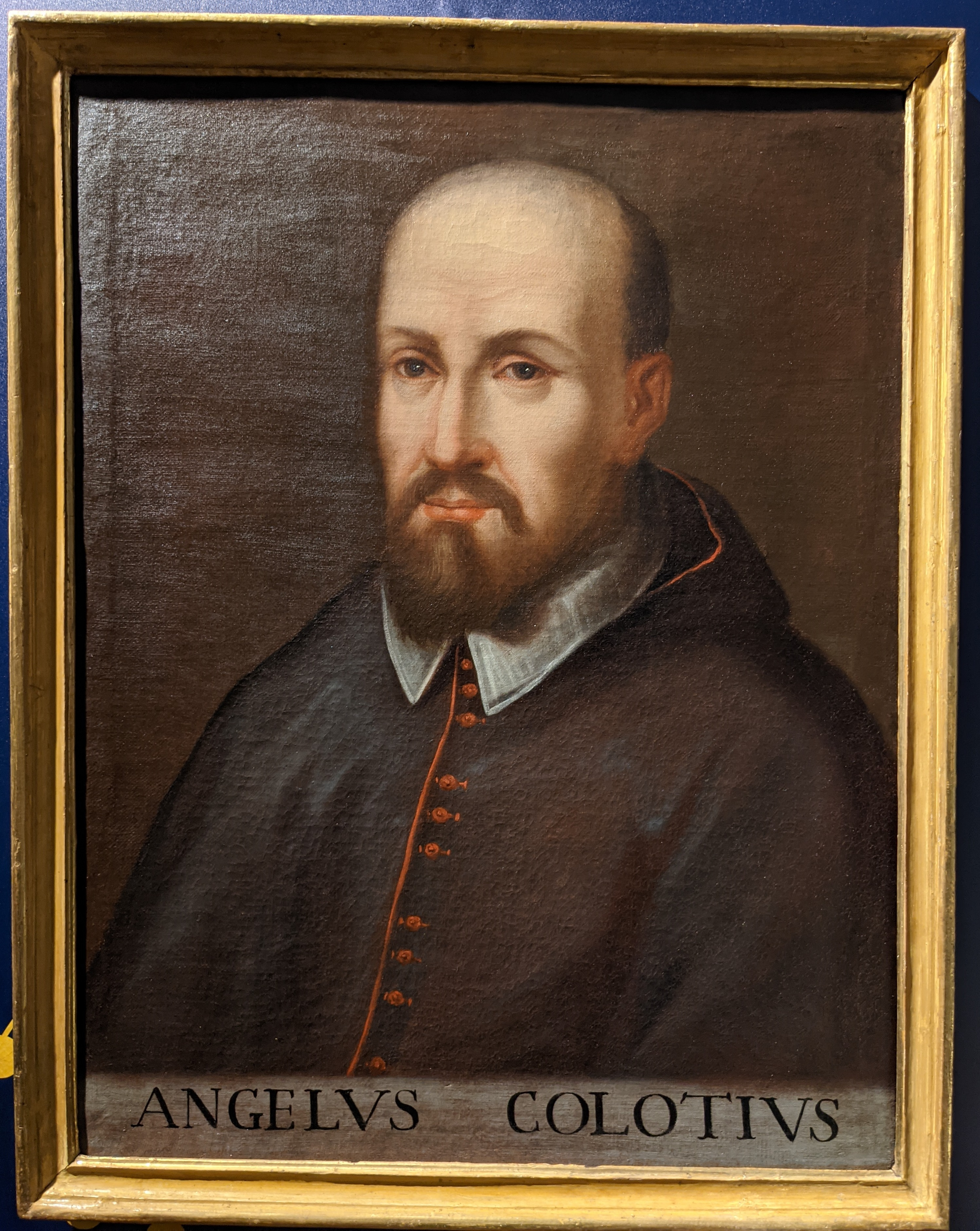

Angelo Colocci (Latin: Angelus Colotius; 1467–1549) was a papal secretary of Pope Leo X, a romance philologist, and a Renaissance humanist. He assembled a large collection of antiquities in his villa beside the Aqua Virgo.

== Life ==
Colocci was born in 1467 at Iesi in Marche. He came to Rome in 1497 (Note: He bought his way into papal service that year, according to Lowry.) as a young man. From 1511 he worked as one of the apostolic secretaries, a demanding position that curtailed his private literary abilities at the same time it placed him in the social center of the humanists at the court of Pope Julius II, (Note: This literary world is discussed by Ingrid D. Rowland's biographical and anecdotal Culture of the High Renaissance.) as a correspondent of Jacopo Sadoleto, Pietro Bembo and Aldus Manutius in Venice. In 1513 he bought a garden property near the Trevi Fountain, which, with the additional draw of his fine library, became a meeting place of the struggling (Note: It had been suppressed by Pope Paul II.) Roman Academy that had been founded by the late Pomponio Leto (died 1497). This garden was sited in the hollow between the Quirinal and the Pincio, in the southern reaches of the ancient Gardens of Sallust, a rich field with buried sculpture (including a menologium rusticum), some of which he displayed in his villa. There the grotto that he arranged round a Roman marble sleeping naiad, with a humanist inscription— Huius nympha loci...—that was so exquisitely turned that it passed for centuries as authentically Roman, was the original of garden features to be found in the great English landscape garden at Stourhead and into the nineteenth century.

Colocci was a Latin poet of some reputation among his learned contemporaries, an antiquarian whose understanding of ancient metrology and sacrificial implements were particularly outstanding, and a savant collector of Roman sculptures, inscriptions, medals and carved gems. His collection of sculptures was mentioned by Andrea Fulvio in Antiquitates Urbis (1527), a topographical guide to the city's ancient Roman ruins and remains. In connection with Pope Leo X's commission to Raphael to draw the most accurate possible reconstruction of the Rome of the Caesars, Angelo Colocci and Baldassare Castiglione drafted the courtly covering letter, with emendations by Raphael, that was enclosed with the final project. A proportion of his considerable fortune was also expended in amassing one of the most impressive private libraries of his time, brutally treated at the Sack of Rome, in 1527, when Colucci was forced to pay exorbitant bribes to preserve his own life. Colocci had the foresight to send some of his manuscripts for safekeeping in Florence. The remaining Colocci manuscripts in the Vatican Library still number over two hundred, even after Napoleonic depredations removed Provençal lyrics to the Bibliothèque nationale, Paris—for Colocci was one of the first to search out and assemble Provençal poetry. The Greek printing press of Rome was under his care, for he was the patron of the Greek academy founded in Rome by Janus Lascaris; it met in his villa from 1516 to 1521. Colocci was involved in the translation of Vitruvius' De Architectura into Italian on Raphael's behest, done by the venerable Marco Fabio Calvo of Ravenna and based on the 1511 edition of Fra Giocondo; Raphael's own copy of it, preserved in Munich, bears Colocci's notes and emendations as well as Raphael's own.

After a long illness, his wife Girolama Bufalini Colocci died in 1518. Colocci then took minor orders. A bishopric was reserved for him in 1521 but not taken up as he continued to see women. He legitimized his two-year-old son Marcantonio in 1526, despite the boy's mother being married to someone else. He was made bishop of Nocera on 1 May 1537 and resigned the position 15 June 1545. He died in 1549.

== Legacy ==
Colocci's early biographer Federico Ubaldini was noted by Bober. Ubaldini's Vita di Mons. Angelo Colocci was edited by Fanelli, who also provided copious notes and a glossary.

A conference was held on Angelo Colocci in the Palazzo della Signoria of his birthplace Iesi in September 1969, which published their papers in 1972. and 1979.
