= Hooker with a heart of gold =

Stock character

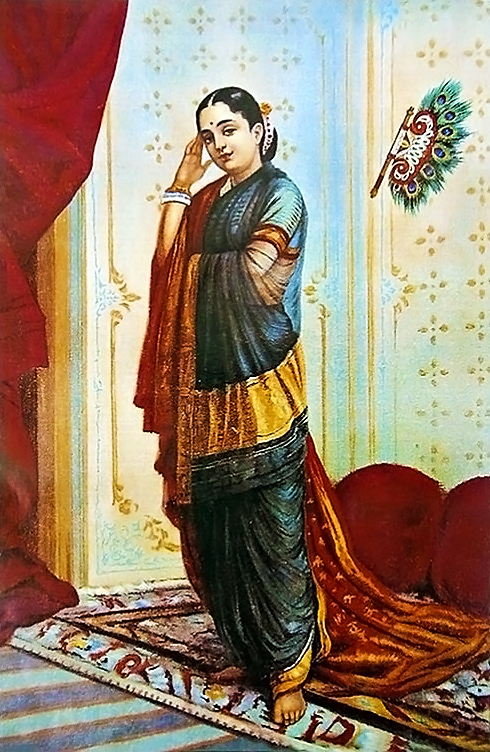
Vasantasena from the Sanskrit play Mṛcchakatika

The "hooker with a heart of gold" (or "tart with a heart" in British English) is a classic character archetype, portraying a courtesan or sex worker who embodies virtues like kindness, generosity, and integrity, despite holding a profession that is sometimes seen as morally degrading. This figure often serves as a contrast to societal expectations, highlighting her decency while addressing the circumstances that led to her occupation. Rooted in ancient traditions, from the sympathetic hetairai of Greek comedy to the revered courtesan Vasantasena in India's Mṛcchakatika, the trope has evolved across cultures and eras.

In Western literature, it gained prominence in the 19th century through works like La Dame aux Camélias, which inspired adaptations such as Verdi’s La Traviata. In modern media, the archetype became widely recognized in films like Pretty Woman, blending romanticized narratives with critiques of societal attitudes, and is sometimes considered a cliché.

== Characteristics ==
The character type is defined by morally positive traits, which are contrasted with the character's employment as a prostitute. The narrative will often provide extenuating circumstances for the character's prostitution, and emphasize her personal decency. Sometimes, the character will be a foil for another female character who reflects negative stereotypes of uptight or frigid women. According to Nell Damon Galles, the character is "the good girl who made one too many bad decisions—losing her virginity, becoming promiscuous, and eventually entering the dark world of prostitution." The "hooker with a heart of gold" has also been described as a "modern 'secular' counterpart" of the medieval sinner-saint.

== Historical development ==
Sex workers appear in ancient Greek literature as far back as the Archaic period, such as in the work of Archilochus, though initially with little focus on their moral qualities. The “good” sex worker (or more specifically “good” hetaira, a type of high-end sex worker) emerged as a stereotype in middle ancient Greek comedy, for example, in Antiphanes's Hydria. The “good” sex worker appeared even more frequently in new ancient Greek comedy. The work of Menander is known for its treatment of the trope, as seen in Plutarch's Table Talks, where Plutarch commends Menander as suitable for use at Symposia because the dramatist had his heroes break off relations with ‘bad’ sex workers, but sometimes marry them if they were “good”.

In classical Roman literature, the sex worker was commonly portrayed as especially selfish – the stereotypically bad woman against whom the femina bona (good woman, typically a loyal wife) was contrasted. This stigma against sex workers largely persists in Western society from Roman times and into the 21st century. Nevertheless, the sex worker with a heart of gold appeared in Roman writings from around the time of Terence. For example, in Terence's Hecyra and in Livy's semi-fictionalised account of Hispala Faecenia. The Roman sex worker with a heart of gold was invariably portrayed as an exception to the norm for sex workers to be selfish and greedy. Unlike the Greek "good hetaera", who could sometimes end up marrying elite men, the Roman sex worker with a heart of gold was generally expected to know her place at the margins of Roman society.

Subsequent development of the stereotype may also have drawn inspiration from traditions surrounding the Biblical figures of Mary Magdalene and Rahab, or the ancient Indian theatrical tradition of Sanskrit drama where Śudraka's play Mṛcchakatika (The Little Clay Cart) featured a nagarvadhu (courtesan) with a heart of gold named Vasantasena.

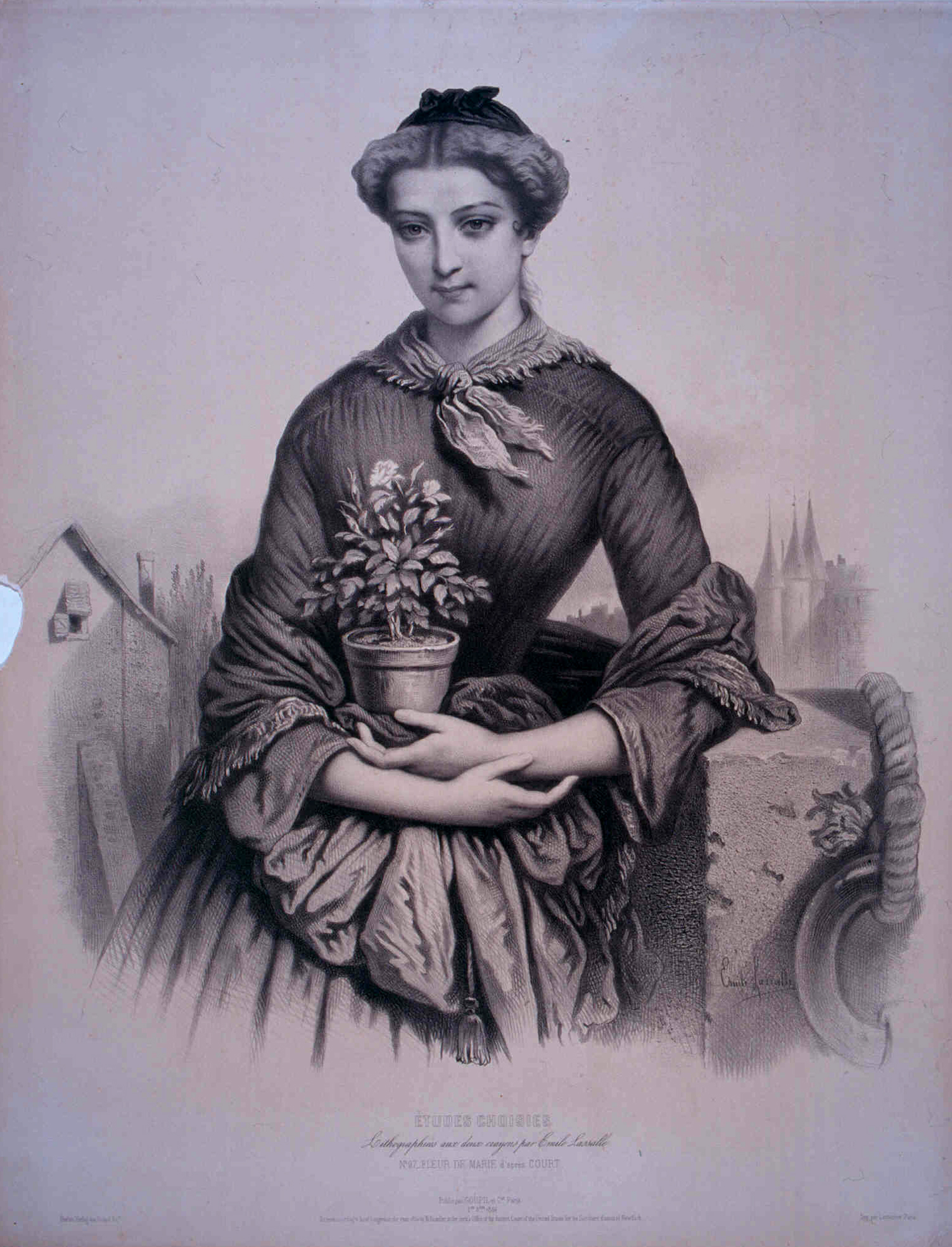
The "universally adored" Fleur de Marie, a hooker with a heart of gold from The Mysteries of Paris

In French literature, early appearances of the sex worker with the heart of gold occurred towards the end of the 18th century, including Rousseau's The Loves of Milord Edouard Bromston (1780). These 18th-century works generally had sad endings, showing that despite her heart of gold, the sex worker was typically unable to gain acceptance into mainstream society. Following the conclusion of the French Revolution in 1799, there were a few years where various minor novelists published happier tales for sex workers with a heart of gold, in the then prevailing spirit of egalitarianism. This soon ended after Napoleon introduced various rules regulating sex work from 1802 to 1804; few sex worker with a heart of gold characters appeared over the next few decades. This began to change towards the middle of the 19th century, with various leading French authors including sex workers with a heart of gold in their writings, such as Victor Hugo's play Marion de Lorme (1828) and novels like Eugène Sue's The Mysteries of Paris (1843) and Honoré de Balzac's Splendeurs et misères des courtisanes (1838–1847). The 1848 French novel by Alexandre Dumas fils, La Dame aux Camélias, later saw many translations and adaptations into plays and movies, in English under the name Camille, and Giuseppe Verdi's opera La Traviata (1853). The original work was based on a real-life sex worker, Marie Duplessis, with whom Dumas had a relationship. According to Charles Bernheimer, a French work that most subverted the sex worker with the heart of gold stereotype was Auguste Villiers de l'Isle-Adam's Contes cruels – there the prostitute was well regarded while she plied her trade in conventional fashion, but was derided once she fell in love.

In American cinema, sex workers were generally portrayed sympathetically even from the earliest films, though the sex worker with a heart of gold was relatively rare until the 1980s. Some early examples of movies featuring a sex worker with a heart of gold are the 1917 and 1918 versions of Camille, 1932's Shanghai Express with Marlene Dietrich and the 1939 movie Stagecoach. In Europe, mainstream portrayals began to be seen by the early 1960s in internationally-popular films such as Never on Sunday and Irma la Douce. The "hooker with a heart of gold" archetype became most prominent in American cinema during the 1980s, peaking with Pretty Woman. The development of the trope reflected a more lighthearted cultural attitude toward sex work, which nonetheless overall condemned women for the social transgression of sex work. The character of Mona in The Best Little Whorehouse in Texas (1982) exemplifies the era's sex worker with a heart of gold: a wonderful woman whose goodness is surprising and amusing because she is also a sex worker, and whose love interest berates her for prostitution. The character of Ophelia, played by Jamie Lee Curtis in the 1983 comedy Trading Places, also represents an example of a sex worker with a heart of gold, according to some reviewers. These films have been criticized as akin to sexploitation films for the way they present a glamorized and male-dominated view of sex work. The “hooker with a heart of gold” trope has also been criticized as a "pathetic cliché".

== See also ==
- Counterstereotype
- List of famous prostitutes and courtesans
- Said the actress to the bishop
