= Vasantasena (disambiguation) =

Vasantasena is a fictional character and the protagonist of the Sanskrit play Mṛichchhakatika.

Vasantasena may also refer to:

- Vasantasena (1941 film), an Indian Kannada-language film
- Vasantha Sena (1967 film), a Telugu-language historical drama film
- Vasantha Sena (1985 film), an Indian Malayalam-language family drama film
