= Vasantsena =

Vasantsena may refer to:

- Vasantasena, a courtesan heroine of ancient Indian literature
- Vasantsena (1929 film), an Indian film directed by Dadasaheb Phalke
- Vasantsena (1930 film), an Indian film directed by Mohan Bhavnani
- Vasantsena (1942 film), a Bollywood film directed by Gajanan Jagirdar
- Vasantasena (1941 film), an Indian Kannada film directed by Ramayyar Shirur
