= Ghoonghat =

Traditional South Asian Hindu headscarf

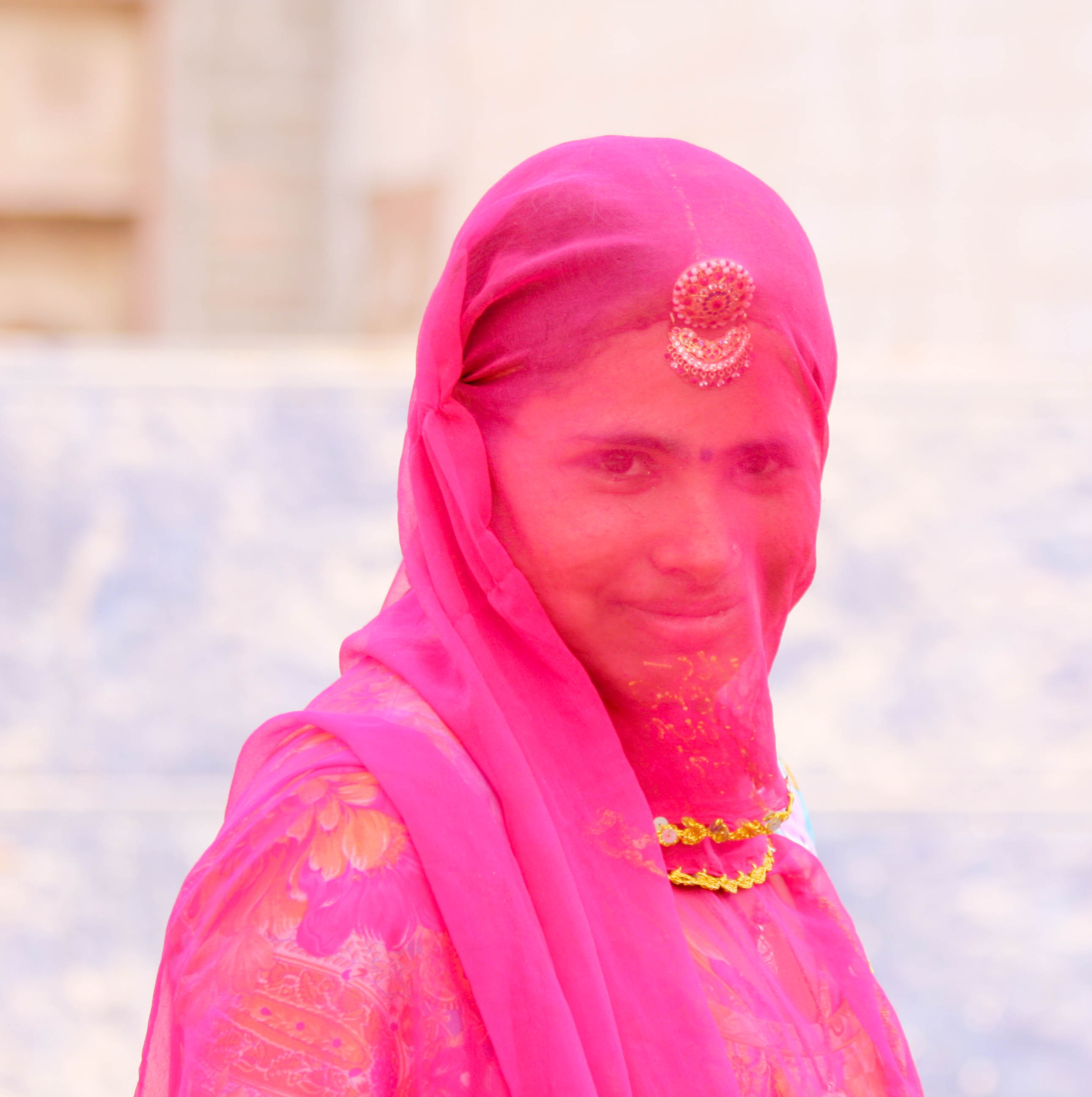
A Hindu woman with a ghoonghat veil.

A ghoonghat (ghunghat, ghunghta, ghomta, orhni, odani, laaj, chunari, jhund, kundh) is a head covering or headscarf, worn primarily in the Indian subcontinent by some married Hindu and Jain women to cover their heads, and often their faces as well. Generally aanchal or pallu, the loose end of a sari is pulled over the head and face in order to act as a ghoonghat. A dupatta (long scarf) is also commonly used as a ghoonghat.

Since the ancient period of India, certain veiling practices (what became known as ghoonghat) has been partially practiced among a section of women. However, it is notable that some section of society from the 1st century B.C. advocated the use of the veil for married women. There is no proof that a large section of society observed strict veiling until the medieval period. Today, facial veiling by Hindu women as part of everyday attire is now mostly limited to the Hindi Belt region of India, particularly in Haryana, Rajasthan, western Uttar Pradesh and some parts of Sindh and northern Gujarat.

It has been both romanticized and criticized in religious and folk literature.

== Etymology ==
The word ghoongat, ghunghat or ghunghta (Hindi: घूँघट) is derived from Avagunthana (Sanskrit: अवगुण्ठन) meaning veil, hiding and cloak and Oguntheti (Prakrit: ओगुन्थेति) to cover, veil over and hide.

== History ==
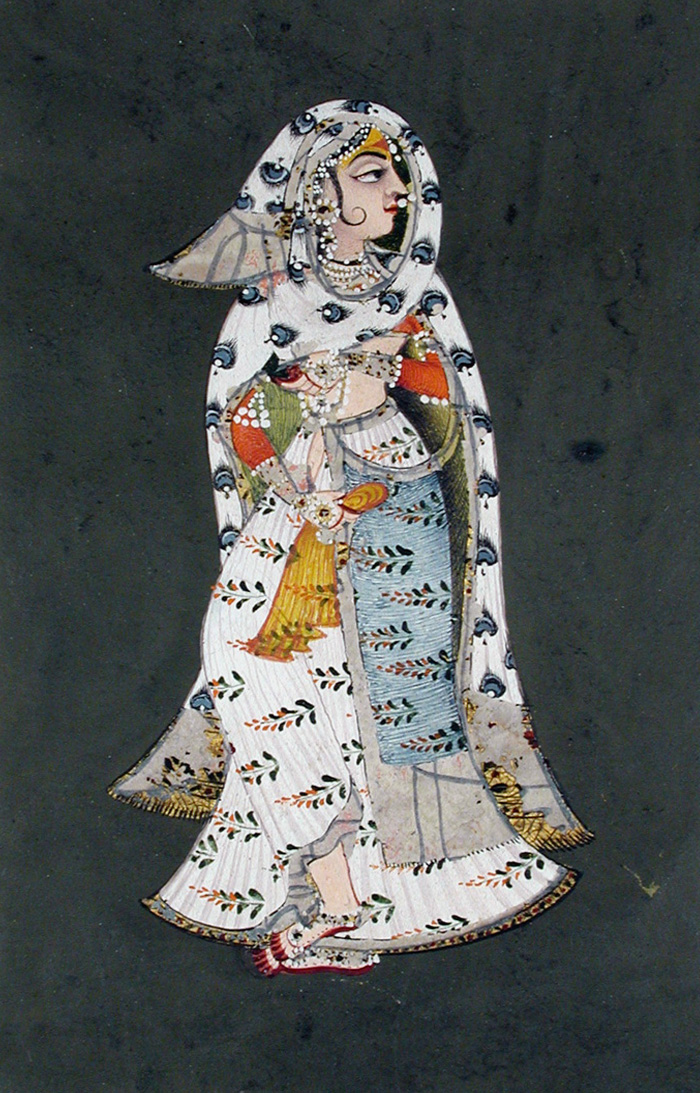
Woman in ghoonghat; an 18th-century Rajput miniature painting from Bundi, Rajasthan, India.

The ghoongat, ghunghat or ghunghta veil evolved from ancient Avagunthana in (Sanskrit: अवगुण्ठन) veil, hiding and cloak. Early Sanskrit literature has a wide vocabulary of terms for the veils used by women, such as avagunthana meaning cloak-veil, uttariya meaning shoulder-veil, and sirovas-tra meaning head-veil.

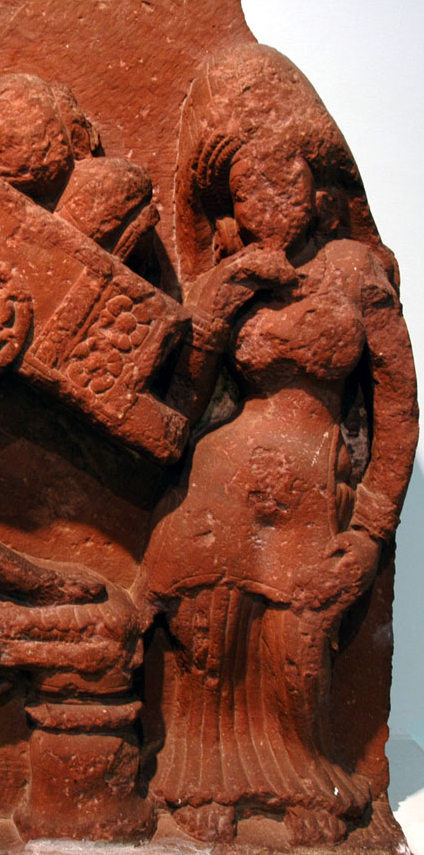
Gupta-period depiction of women in veiling, 320 CE–550 CE, Uttar Pradesh, India.

In the post-Gupta period, Śūdraka, the author of Mṛcchakatika mentions that some females wore a veil (avagunthana). However, Sudraka notes it was not used by women every day and at every time. It was worn on special occasions like marriage or while going out. Śūdraka notes that a married woman was expected to put on a veil while moving in public. This may indicate that it was not necessary for unmarried females to put on a veil.

In the Sanskrit play Mṛcchakatika, courtesan Vasantasena's mother sends Vasantasena with her maid and asks her to go in the carriage bedecked with ornaments and an avagunthana veil after receiving ornaments for her daughter from a wealthy suitor to keep her as his mistress. This instruction is taken to signify that a courtesan who has accepted a suitor, had to use a veil in public similar to married women. At the end of the play when Vasanthasena is legally wedded, she receives the title "Vadhūśabda" meaning "title of a bride" simultaneously with the veil "vasantasenām avagunthya" meaning "a token of honorable marriage". In the same literature, the courtesans' maid servant Madanika marries her lover Sarvilaka, a thief who changes his ways. Her new husband told her that she has achieved what is difficult to acquire: "Vadhūśabda avagunthanam" meaning "the title and veil of a bride".

In the Pratimānātaka, a play by Bhāsa (3 - 4 CE) describes in context of the Avagunthana cloak-veil that "ladies may be seen without any blame [for the parties concerned] in a religious session, in marriage festivities, during a calamity and in a forest". The same sentiment is more generically expressed in Nāgānanda and Priyadarśikā by Harsha, where maidens were not expected to wear a veil until after marriage. Later, the veil was referred to by the same term, avagunthana, in Śiśupālavadha and the Dashakumaracharita. According to commentator Sankara, the ladies of Sthanvisvara used to go about covering their faces with a veil.

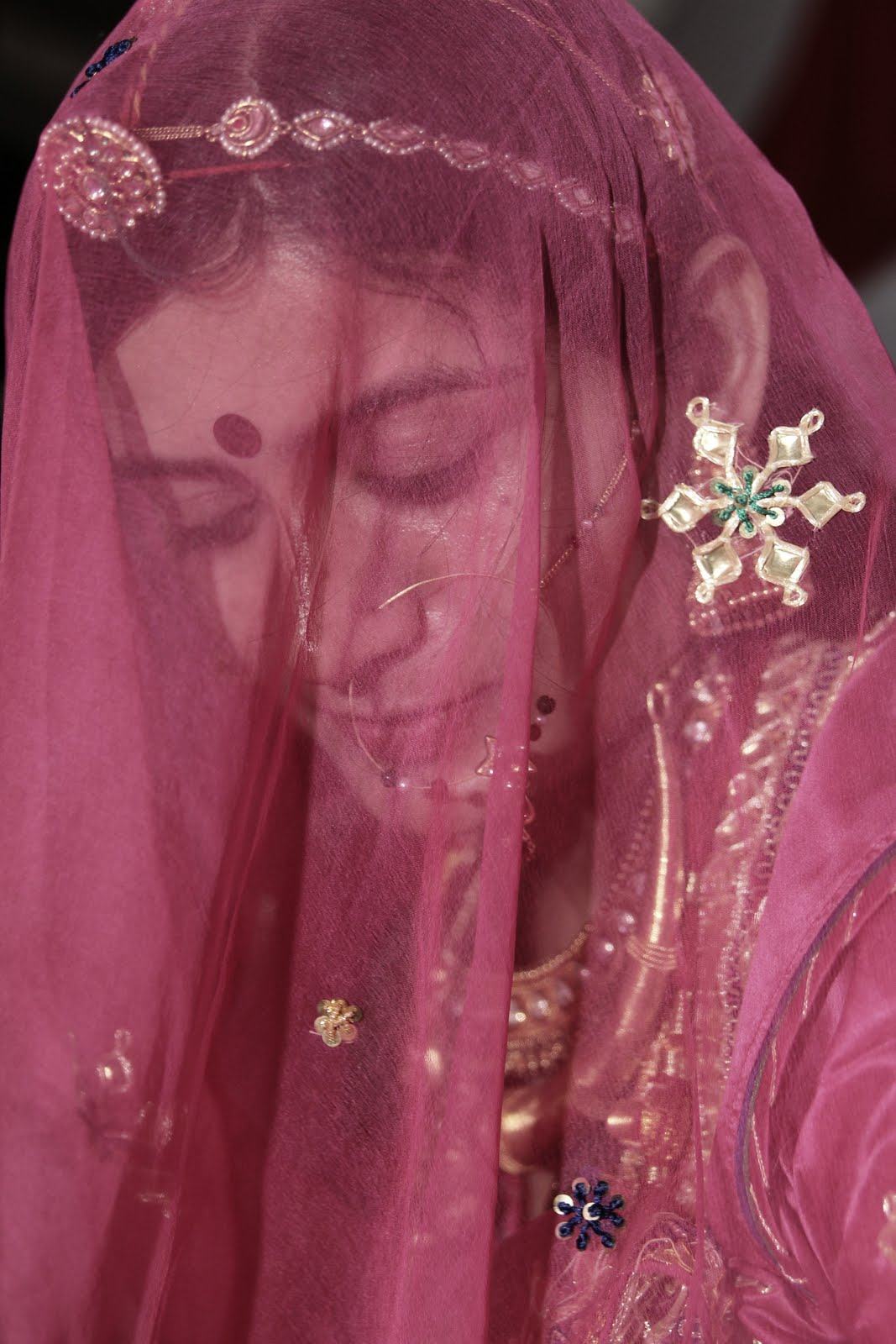
Bride in ghoonghat during Muh Dikhai ceremony in Rajasthan, India.

In the Mahayana Buddhist sutra called Lalitavistara Sūtra, a young bride Yasodharā objected to observing the veil (oguntheti/oguṇthikā) in front of respected elders. This was taken to be a sign of immodesty, as people criticized her and gossiped. When she became aware of this, Yasodharā came before the assembled court and defended herself in a long statement: "Those whose thoughts have no cover, no shame or decorum or any virtue, those who gossip, may cover themselves with a thousand garments, yet they walk the earth naked. But those who veil their minds, control their senses, and have no thought for any other except their husband, why should they veil their faces?" Yasodharā's parents-in-law were delighted with their daughter-in-law's proud statement and gave her two white garments covered with jewels.

The Lalitavistara Sūtra reflects changing times around the 3rd century CE and Buddhists' attempt to counter this growing practice, as there is no mention of this entire incident in early Buddhist Theravada literature.9

In Abhijñānaśākuntalam by Kālidāsa, written between the 3rd and 4th century CE, when the heroine arrives at King Duhsanta's palace, seeking to take up her wifely status, the king first remarks "Kā svid avagunthanavati" meaning "who is this veiled one?" and immediately forbears to look at her, with the words "Anirvarnaniyam parakalatram" meaning "The wife of another is not to be inspected." This largely indicates that Avagunthana was a sign of a respectable married woman, and was a married woman's raiment.

=== Medieval period ===
In Kathāsaritsāgara written in the 11th century AD, heroine in the story Ratnaprabhā protesting: "I consider that the strict seclusion of women is a folly produced by jealousy. It is of no use whatsoever. Women of good character are guarded only by their own virtue and nothing else." Rational opposition against veiling and seclusion from strong-willed women resulted in the system declining in popularity for several centuries. However, some sections of society from the 1st century B.C. advocated the use of the veil for married women. There is no proof that a large section of society observed strict veiling until the medieval period.

Under the Islamic Mughal Empire, various aspects of veiling and seclusion for women was adopted, such as the concept of Purdah and Zenana, partly as an additional protection for women. Purdah became common in the 15th and 16th century, as both Vidyāpati and Chaitanya mention it. Sikhism was highly critical of purdah; Guru Amar Das condemned it and rejected seclusion and veiling of women, which saw decline of purdah among most classes during this period.

A Hindu bride with full veiling during Hindu wedding ceremony in Jaipur, Rajasthan, India.

Significance

During a marriage ceremony, the bride wears a veil given by her parents. Later, during the ceremony the bride's mother-in-law covers her face with ghoonghat. The bride therefore simultaneously wears the veil given by her parents and that from her in-laws, symbolizing her passing from the protection of one household to another.

Muh Dikhai (Devanagari: मुँह दिखाई, first gaze) is a post-wedding ceremony, where the bride is formally introduced to the groom's relatives and extended family. The ceremony takes place once the bride arrives in her new home. Each family member lifts her veil, looks at the bride and gives her a welcoming gift. She receives Shagun from her mother-in-law, which is typically jewelry, clothing and silverware. After this ceremony, the bride observes full veiling for the next few months or until her parents-in-law advise her to unveil.

=== Post-1900s ===
During the early 1900s, women of royal and aristocratic class were the first to abandon strict veiling in public. However, the head was loosely veiled due to sensitivity towards the custom during changing times. The other classes soon followed. Still, the veil lingered on in some parts of India until well after the 1940s. Facial veiling has gradually declined, and is mostly limited to parts of Hindi-speaking areas today. In ghungat, a woman will veil her face from all male relatives by marriage who are senior to her husband. The effect of ghungat is to limit a young woman's interaction with older men.

In 2004, the India Human Development Survey (IHDS) found that 15% of women in India practice some form of ghoonghat, majority of them in Hindi-speaking states. The survey found that some women may cover their face fully but for others, partial covering of the face is more a nod to propriety than a large impediment. Dupatta is a part of the Punjabi suit which is traditionally worn by Sikh women. While old Sikh women always cover their heads with it, the younger women prefer to put it around their shoulders. Women are supposed to cover their heads with dupatta or chunni in gurdwaras.

=== Gallery ===
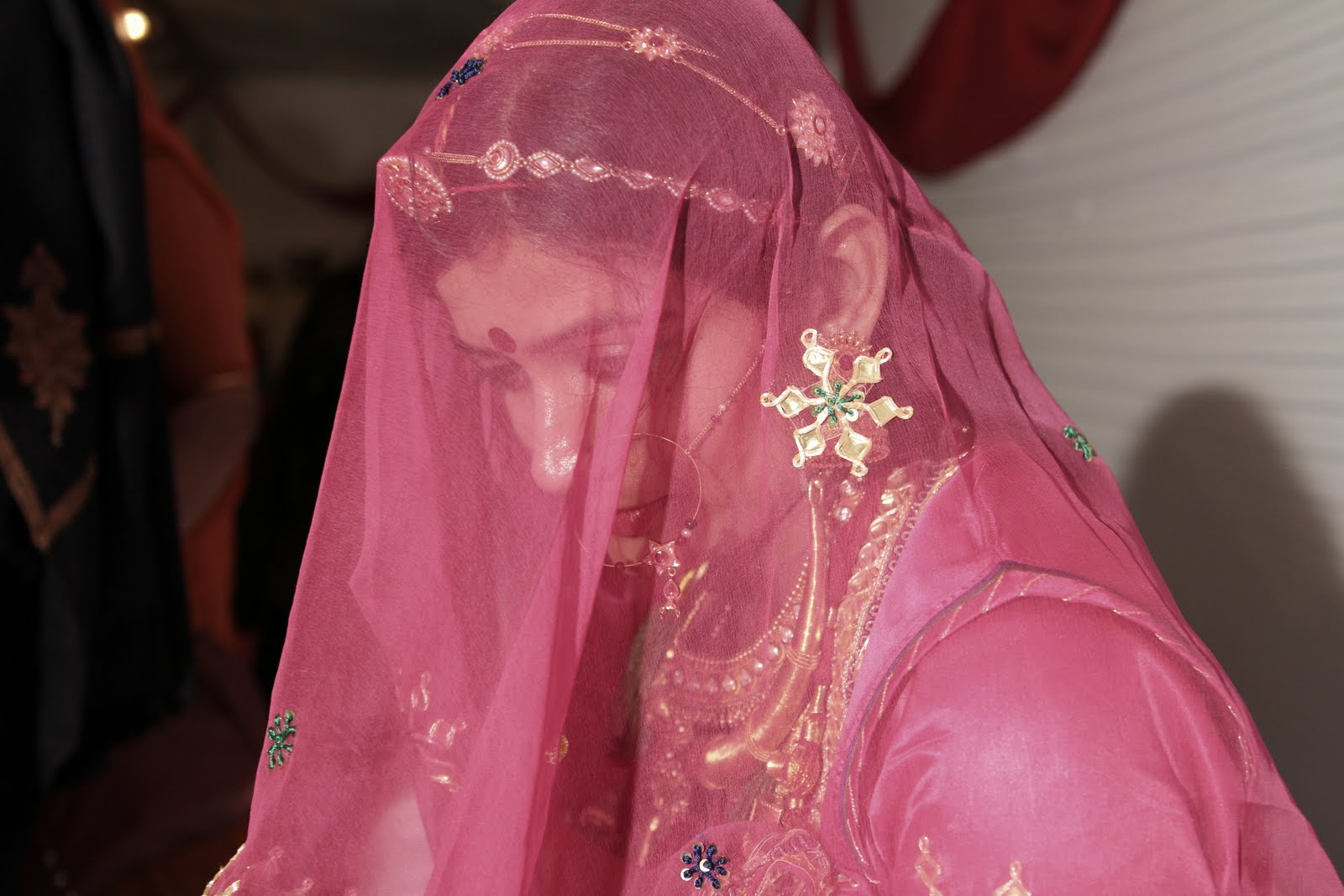
Bride in veiling during Muh Dikhai ceremony.

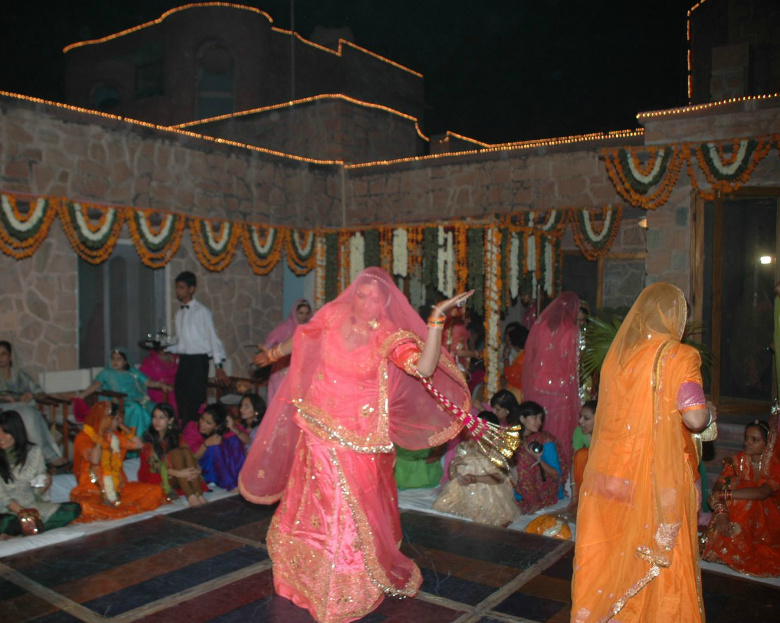
Women in veil performing folk dance at wedding.

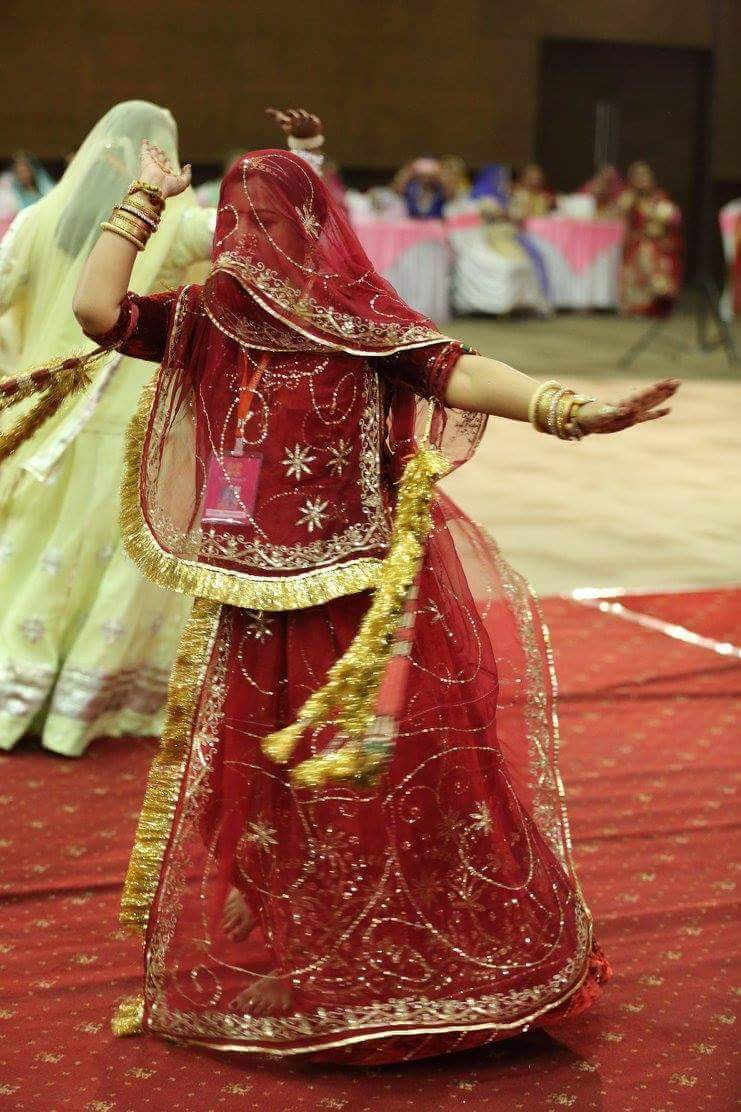
Woman performing folk dance in ghoonghat.

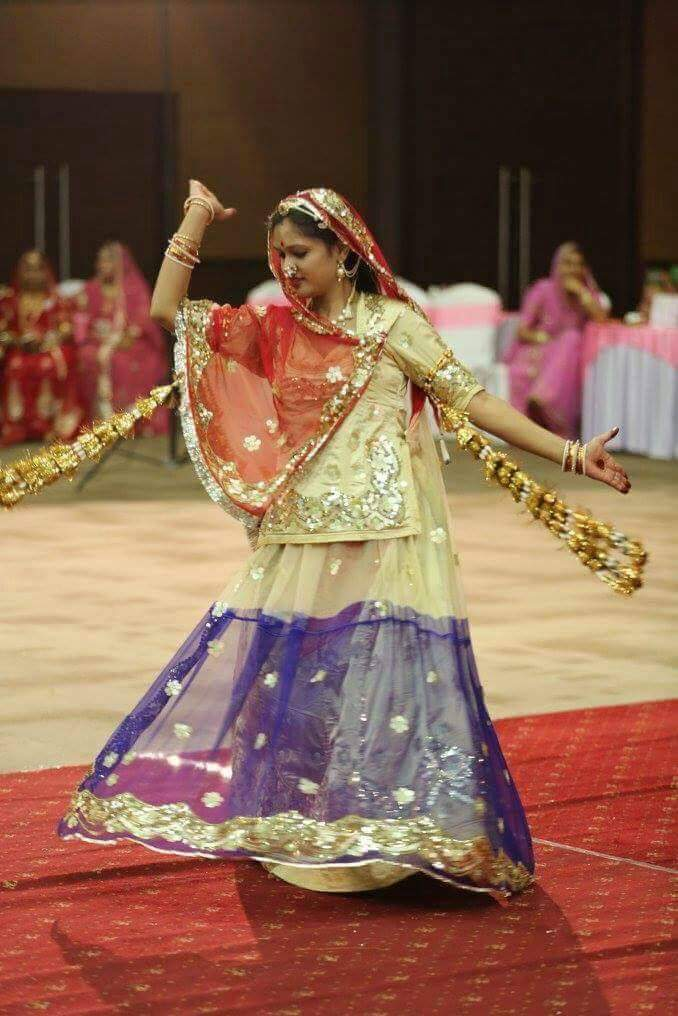
Woman with a ghoonghat performing a Ghumar dance.

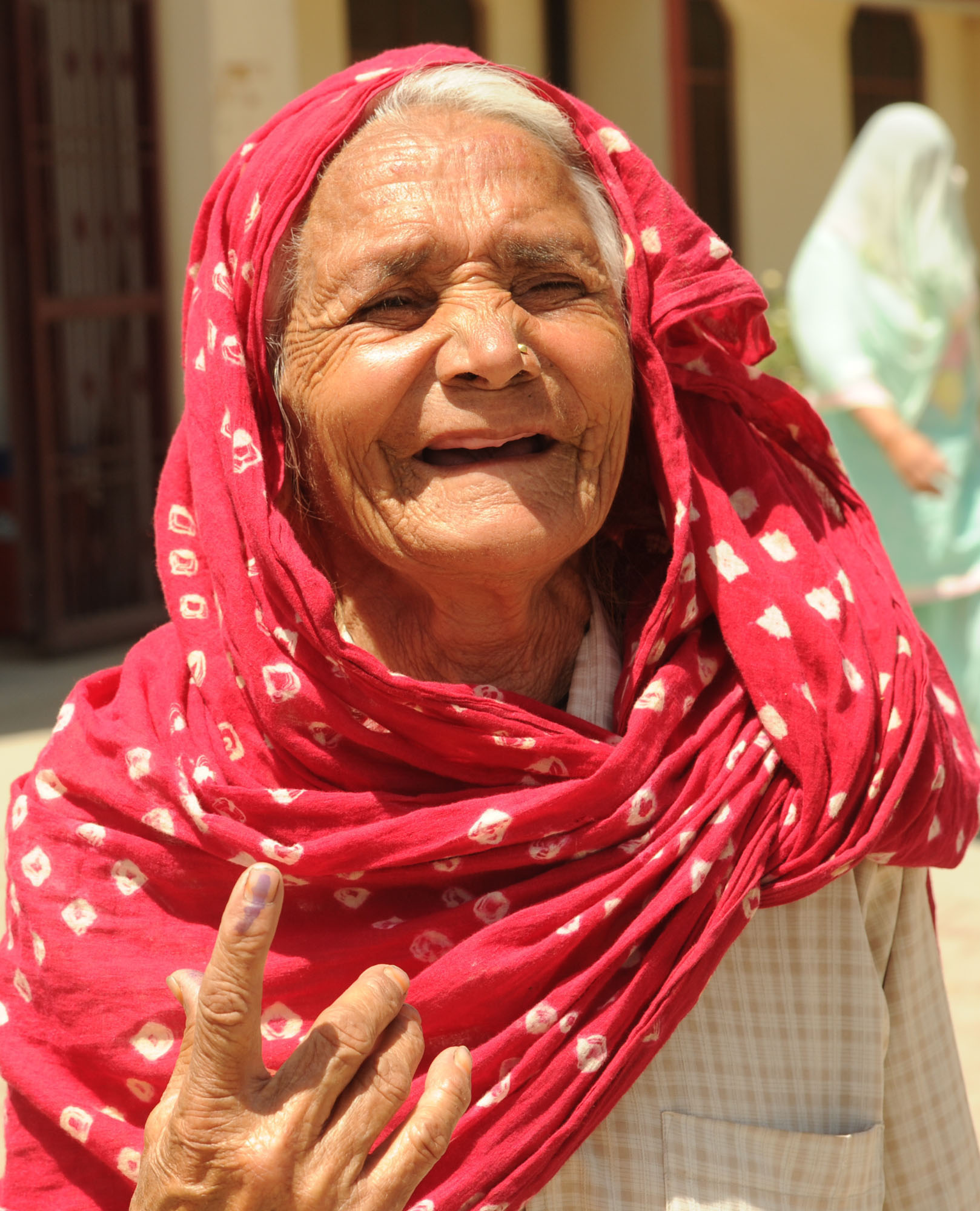
Old woman in Haryana with odhni

== See also ==
- Head coverings in Abrahamic faiths:
  - Head covering for Jewish women
  - Head covering for Christian women
  - Head covering for Muslim women
- Head coverings in other faiths:
  - Sikh women and turbans
