= Bacchanalia =

Roman cults of the wine god and seer Bacchus

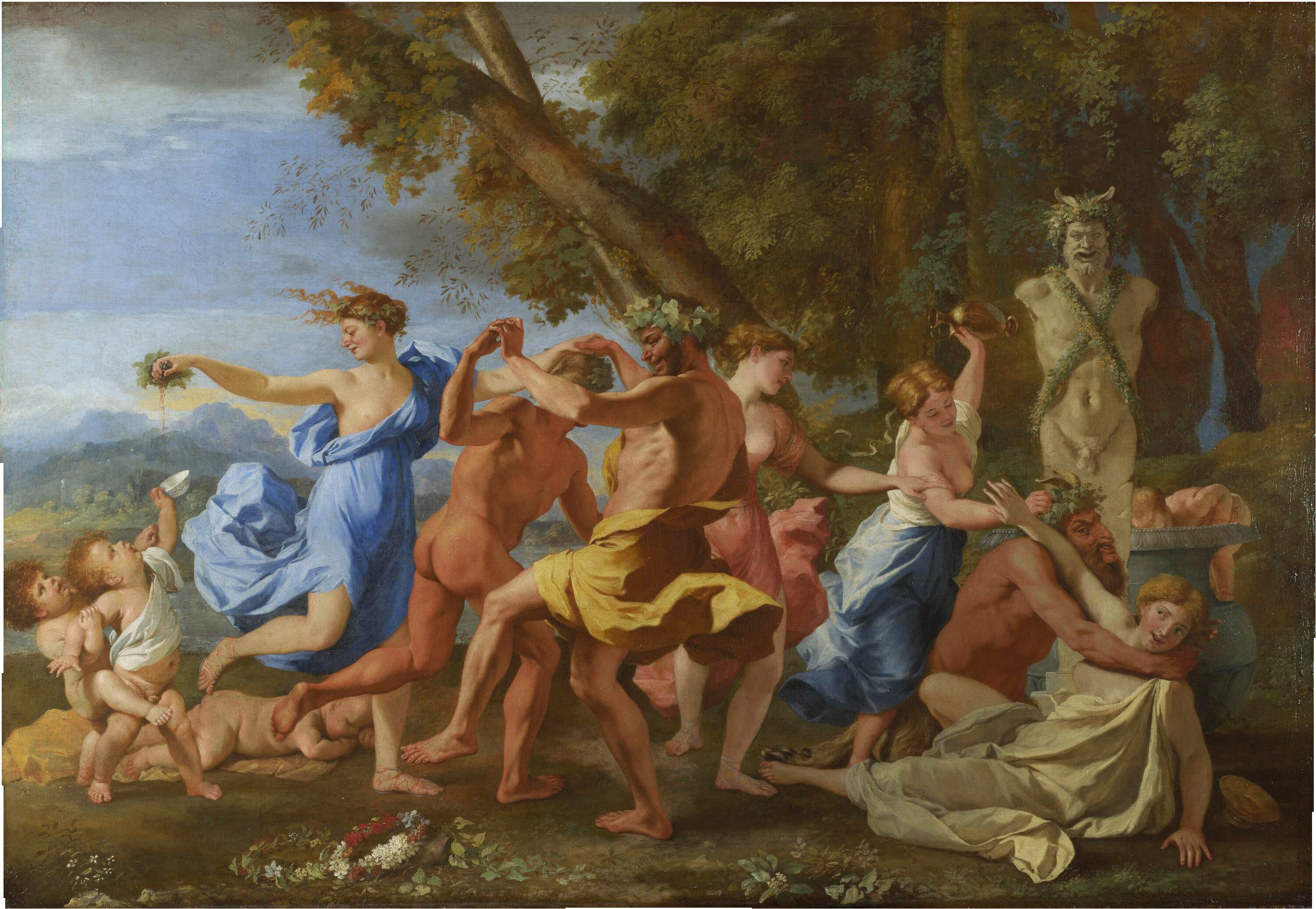
A Bacchanalian Revel Before a Term, Nicolas Poussin, 1632–1633

The Bacchanalia were unofficial, privately funded popular Roman festivals of Bacchus, based on various ecstatic elements of the Greek Dionysia. They were almost certainly associated with Rome's native cult of Liber, and probably arrived in Rome itself around 200 BC. Like all mystery religions of the ancient world, very little is known of their rites. They seem to have been popular and well-organised throughout the central and southern Italian peninsula.

Livy, writing some 200 years after the event, offers a scandalized and extremely colourful account of the Bacchanalia, with frenzied rites, sexually violent initiations of both sexes, all ages and all social classes; he represents the cult as a murderous instrument of conspiracy against the state. Livy claims that seven thousand cult leaders and followers were arrested, and that most were executed. Livy believed the Bacchanalia scandal to be one of several indications of Rome's inexorable moral decay. Modern scholars take a skeptical approach to Livy's allegations.

The cult was not banned. Senatorial legislation to reform the Bacchanalia in 186 BC attempted to control their size, organisation, and priesthoods, under threat of the death penalty. The reformed Bacchanalia rites may have been merged with the Liberalia festival. Bacchus, Liber and Dionysus became virtually interchangeable from the late Republican era (133 BC and onward), and their mystery cults persisted well into the Principate of the Roman Imperial era.

== Background and development ==
The Bacchanalia were Roman festivals of Bacchus, the Greco-Roman god of wine, freedom, intoxication and ecstasy. They were based on the Greek Dionysia and the Dionysian Mysteries, and probably arrived in Rome c. 200 BC via the Greek colonies in southern Italy, and from Etruria, Rome's northern neighbour. Tenney Frank suggests that some form of Dionysian worship may have been introduced to Rome by captives from the formerly Greek city of Tarentum in southern Italy, captured from the Carthaginians in 209 BC. Like all mystery cults, the Bacchanalia were held in strict privacy, and initiates were bound to secrecy; what little is known of the cult and its rites derives from Greek and Roman literature, plays, statuary and paintings. One of the earliest sources is Greek playwright Euripides's The Bacchae, which won the Athenian Dionysia competition in 405 BC. The Bacchanalia may have had mystery elements and public elements; religious dramas which were performed in public, and private rites performed by acolytes and priests of the deity.

Livy, the principal Roman literary source on the early Bacchanalia, names Paculla Annia, a Campanian priestess of Bacchus, as the founder of a private, unofficial Bacchanalia cult in Rome, based at the grove of Stimula, where the western slope of the Aventine Hill descends to the Tiber. The Aventine was an ethnically mixed district, strongly identified with Rome's plebeian class and the ingress of new and foreign cults. The wine and fertility god Liber Pater ("The Free Father"), divine patron of plebeian rights, freedoms and augury, had a long-established official cult in the nearby temple he shared with Ceres and Libera. Most Roman sources describe him as Rome's equivalent to Dionysus and Bacchus, both of whom were sometimes titled Eleutherios (liberator).

== Bacchanalia scandal ==
Livy claims the earliest version of the Bacchanalia was open to women only, and held on three days of the year, in daylight; while in nearby Etruria, north of Rome, a "Greek of humble origin, versed in sacrifices and soothsaying" had established a nocturnal version, added wine and feasting to the mix, and thus acquired an enthusiastic following of women and men. The nocturnal version of the Bacchanalia involved wine-drinking to excess drunkenness and the free mingling of the sexes and classes; the rites also involved loud music.

According to Livy's account, Publius Aebutius of the gens Aebutia was warned against the cult and its excesses by a courtesan, Hispala Faecenia. The Senate appointed Spurius Postumius Albinus and Quintus Marcius Philippus to investigate the cult. The inquiry claimed that under the cover of religion, priests and acolytes broke civil, moral and religious laws with impunity; weak-minded individuals could be persuaded to commit ritual or political murders undetected, at the behest of those who secretly controlled the cult, right in the heart of Rome. Livy claims that the cult held particular appeal to those of uneducated and fickle mind (levitas animi), such as the young, plebeians, women and "men most like women", and that most of the city's population was involved, even some members of Rome's highest class.

== Reform ==
The Legislation of 186 survives in the form of an inscription. Known as the Senatus consultum de Bacchanalibus, it brought the Bacchanalia under control of the Senate, and thus of the Roman pontifices. The existing cult chapters and colleges were dismantled. Congregations of mixed gender were permitted, but were limited to no more than two men and three women, and any Bacchanalia gathering must seek prior permission from the Senate. Men were forbidden Bacchus's priesthood.

Despite their official suppression, illicit Bacchanals persisted covertly for many years, particularly in Southern Italy, their likely place of origin. The reformed, officially approved Bacchic cults would have borne little resemblance to the earlier crowded, ecstatic and uninhibited Bacchanalia. Similar attrition may have been imposed on Liber's cults; his perceived or actual association with the Bacchanalia may be the reason that his Liberalia ludi of 17 March were temporarily moved to Ceres' Cerealia of 12–19 April. They were restored when the ferocity of reaction eased, but in approved, much modified form.

== Interpretations ==
Livy's account of the Bacchanalia has been described as "tendentious to say the least". As a political and social conservative, he had a deep mistrust of mystery religions, and probably understood any form of Bacchanalia as a sign of Roman degeneracy. Though most of his dramatis personae are known historical figures, their speeches are implausibly circumstantial, and his characters, tropes and plot developments draw more from Roman satyr plays than from the Bacchanalia themselves. Paculla Annia is unlikely to have introduced all the changes he attributes to her.

For Livy, the cult's greatest offences arose from indiscriminate mixing of freeborn Romans of both sexes and all ages at night, a time when passions are easily aroused, especially given wine and unrestricted opportunity. Women at these gatherings, he says, outnumbered men; and his account has the consul Postumius stress the overwhelmingly female nature and organization of the cult. Yet the Senatus consultum de Bacchanalibus itself allows women to outnumber men, by three to two, at any permitted gathering; and it expressly forbids Bacchic priesthoods to men. Livy's own narrative names all but one of the offending cult leaders as male, which seems to eliminate any perceived "conspiracy of women". Gender seems to have motivated the Senate's response no more than any other cause.

Livy's consistent negative description of the cult's Greek origins and low moral character—not even Bacchus is exempt from this judgment—may have sought to justify its suppression as a sudden "infiltration of too many Greek elements into Roman worship". The cult had, however, been active in Rome for many years before its supposedly abrupt discovery, and Bacchic and Dionysiac cults had been part of life in Roman and allied, Greek-speaking Italy for many decades. Greek cults and Greek influences had been part of Rome's religious life since the 5th century BC, and Rome's acquisition of foreign cults—Greek or otherwise—through the alliance, treaty, capture or conquest was a cornerstone of its foreign policy, and an essential feature of its eventual hegemony. While the pace of such introductions had gathered rapidly during the 3rd century, contemporary evidence of the Bacchanalia reform betrays no anti-Greek or anti-foreign policy or sentiment.

Gruen interprets the Senatus consultum as a piece of Realpolitik, a display of the Roman senate's authority to its Italian allies after the Second Punic War, and a reminder to any Roman politician, populist and would-be generalissimo that the Senate's collective authority trumped all personal ambition. Nevertheless, the extent and ferocity of the official response to the Bacchanalia was probably unprecedented, and betrays some form of moral panic on the part of Roman authorities; Burkert finds "nothing comparable in religious history before the persecutions of Christians".

== Modern usage ==
In modern usage, bacchanalia can mean any uninhibited or drunken revelry. The bacchanal in art describes any small group of revelers, often including satyrs and perhaps Bacchus or Silenus, usually in a landscape setting. The subject was popular from the Renaissance onwards, and usually included a large degree of nudity among the figures.

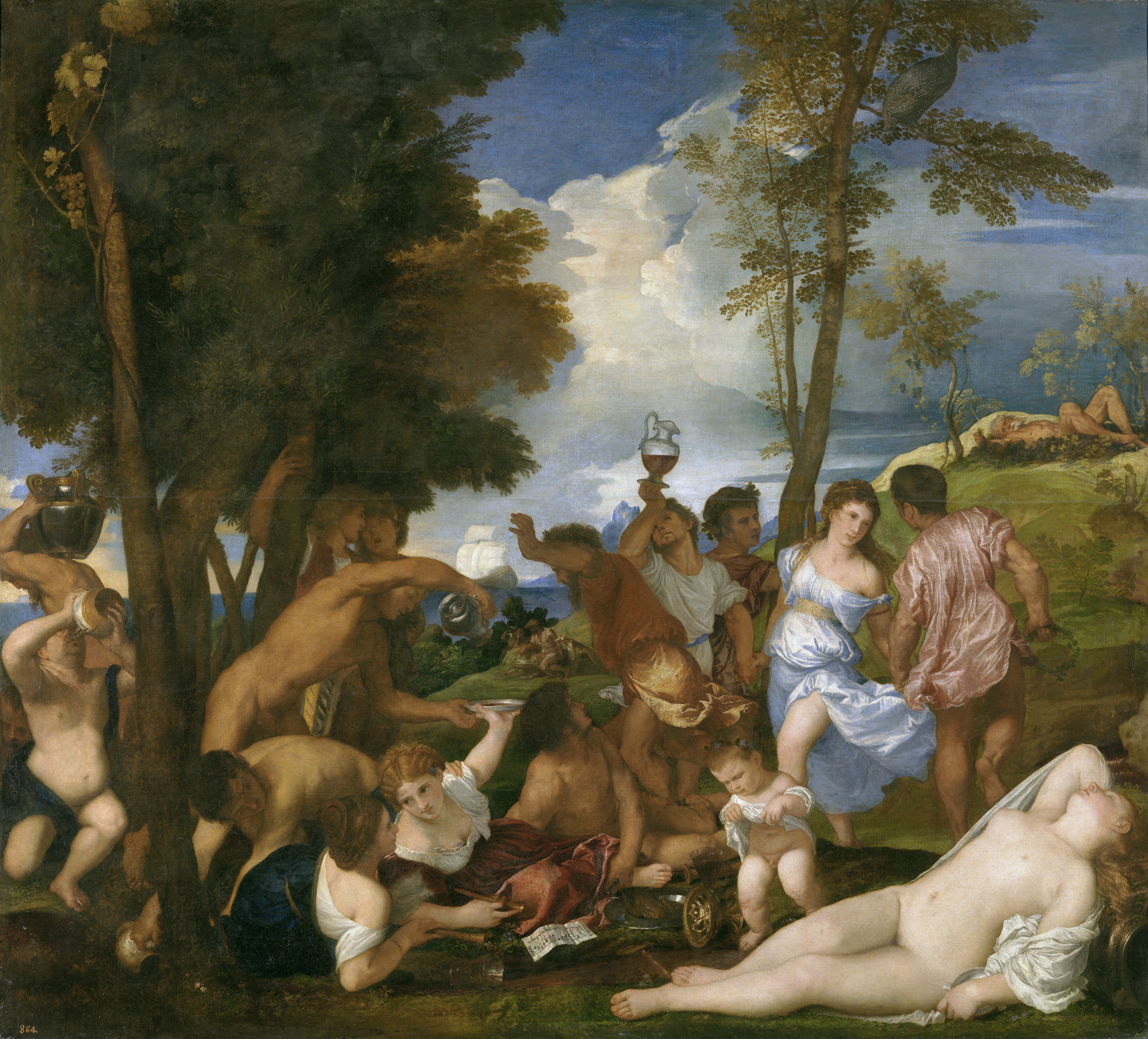
Titian, The Bacchanal of the Andrians, 1523–1526

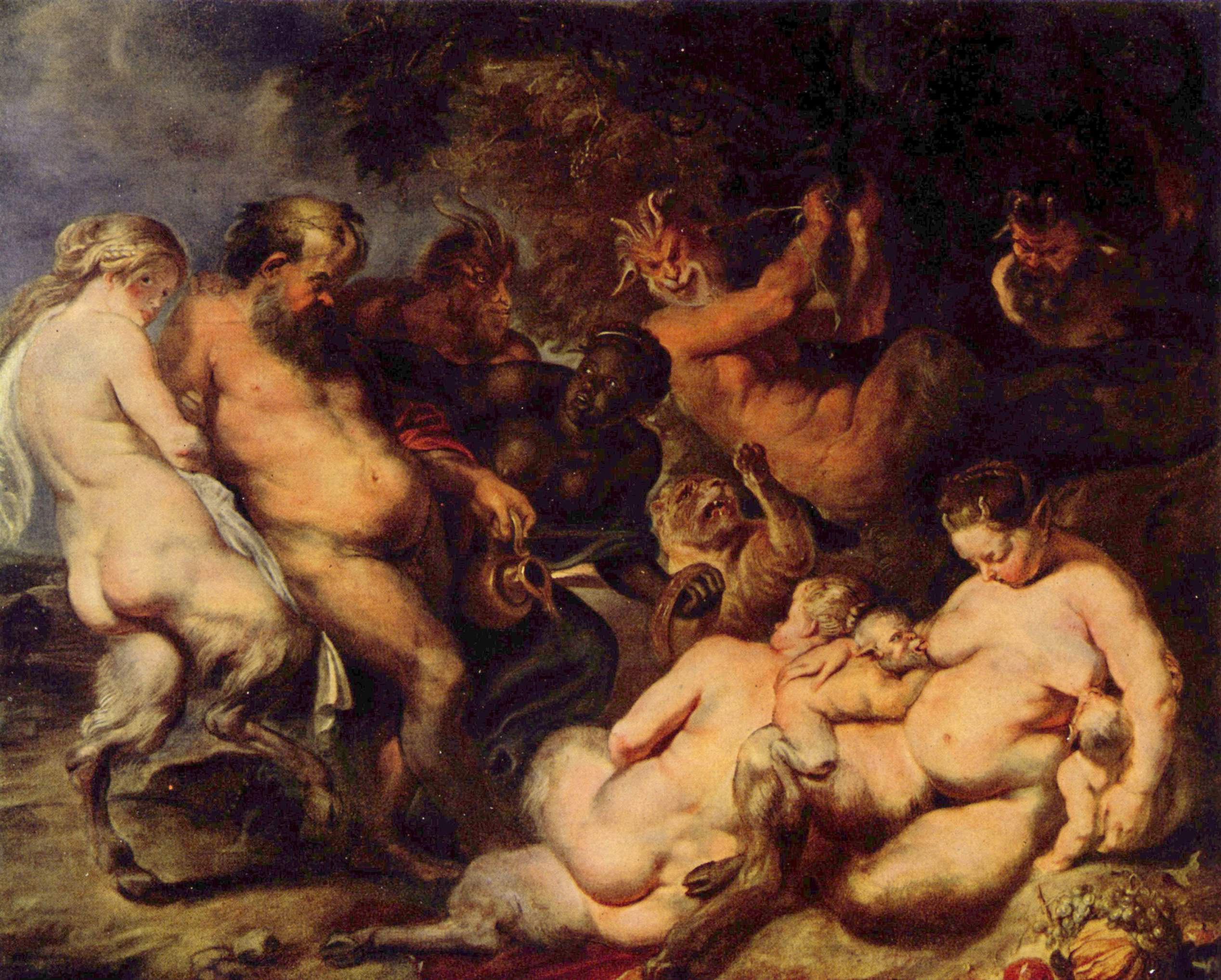
Peter Paul Rubens, Bacchanalia, 1615

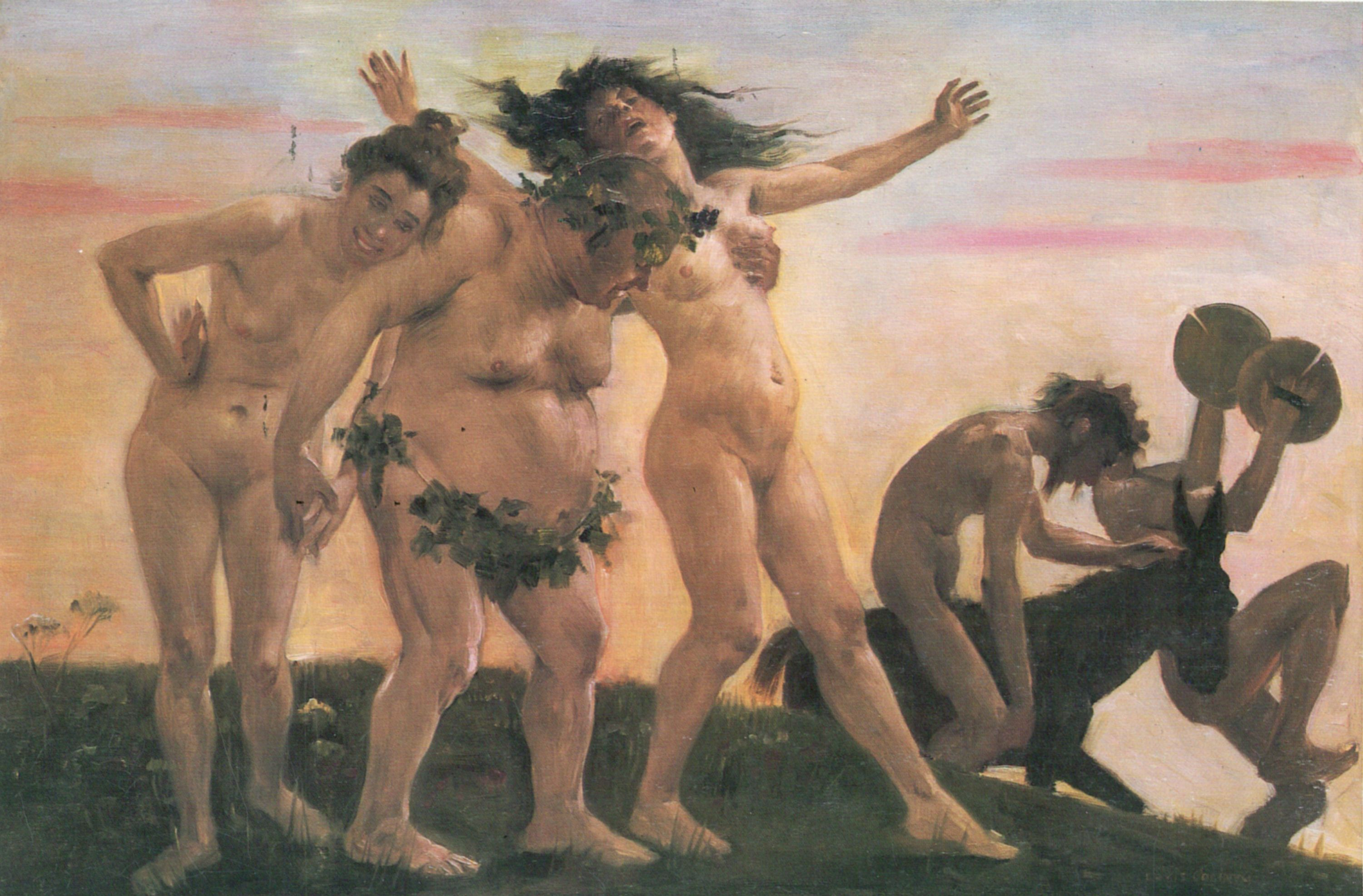
Lovis Corinth, Bacchanalia, 1898

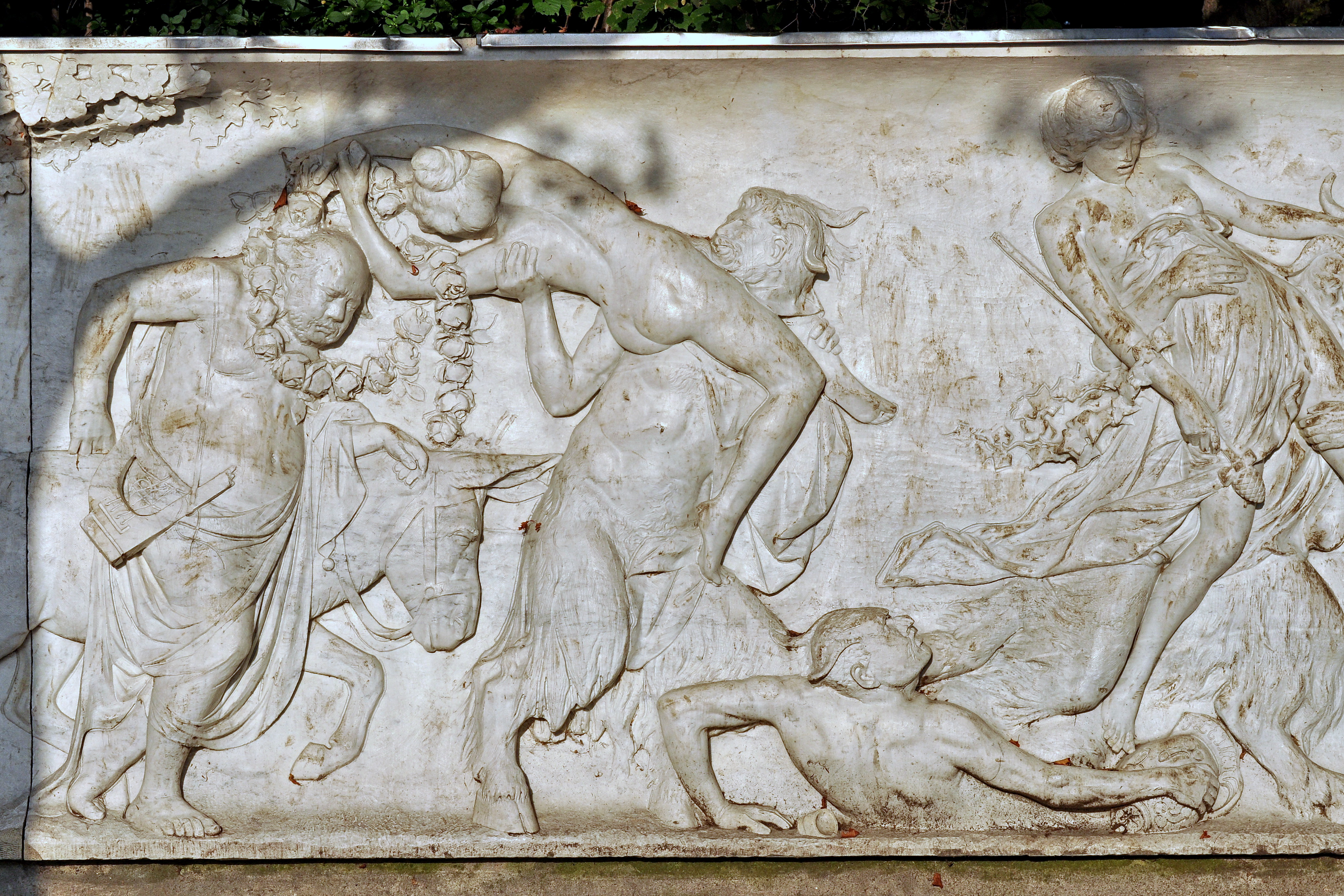
A. Meyer, frieze in Seefeld (Zürich), 1900

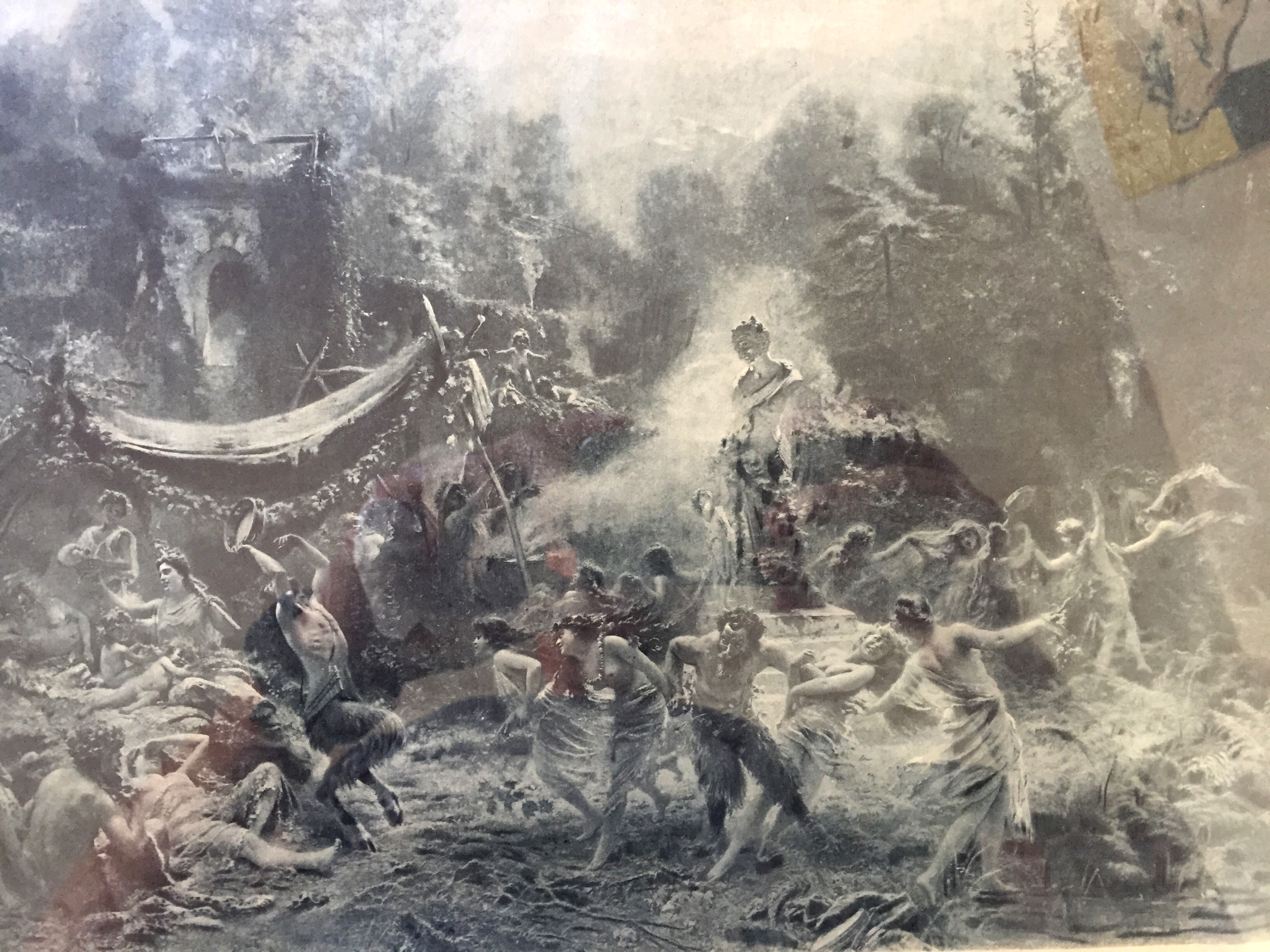
Konstantin Makovsky, Spring Bacchanalia, 1891

== See also ==
- Anthesteria
- Ganachakra
- Maenads, female worshippers of Dionysus
- Saturnalia, a Roman festivity
- Thriambus, a hymn sung in processions in honour of Dionysus
