= Vasantha Sena (1967 film) =

- Theatrical release poster
- Directed by: B. S. Ranga
- Written by: Vempati Sadasivabrahmam (dialogues)
- Based on: Sanskrit play drama, Mṛcchakatika
- Produced by: B. S. Ranga
- Starring: Akkineni Nageswara Rao; Krishna Kumari
- Cinematography: B. S. Ranga; B. S. Hayaas
- Edited by: P. J. Mohan; M. Devendranath; T. Chakrapani
- Music by: S. Rajeswara Rao
- Production company: Vikram Productions
- Distributed by: Navayuga Films
- Release date: 12 August 1967
- Country: India
- Language: Telugu

Vasantha Sena is a 1967 Telugu-language historical drama film, produced and directed by B. S. Ranga under the Vikram Studios banner. It stars Akkineni Nageswara Rao and Krishna Kumari, with music composed by S. Rajeswara Rao. The film is based on the Sanskrit Stage drama, Mṛcchakatika by Śūdraka of 5th century AD. It was Padmini's last Telugu movie.

== Cast ==
- Akkineni Nageswara Rao as Chaaru Datta
- Krishna Kumari as Vasantha Sena
- S. V. Ranga Rao as Samsthanaka
- Relangi as Sarvilaka
- Satyanarayana as Aryaka
- Balakrishna as Maitriya
- Anjali Devi as Aditi
- Girija as Madanika
- Padmini as Anaga Sena
- Savitha

== Crew ==
- Art: Vaali, Sudhidu Rai
- Choreography: Heeralal, Chinni-Sampath, A. K. Chopra
- Dialogues: Vempati Sadasivabrahmam
- Lyrics: C. Narayana Reddy, Dasaradhi, Sri Sri, Kosaraju
- Playback: Ghantasala, P. Susheela, S. Janaki, P. B. Sreenivas, Madhavapeddi Satyam, P. Leela, B. Vasantha, Swarnalata
- Music: S. Rajeswara Rao
- Editing: P. J. Mohan, M. Devendranath, T. Chakrapani
- Cinematography: B. S. Ranga, B. S. Hayaas
- Producer - Director: B. S. Ranga
- Banner: Vikram Productions
- Release Date: 12 August 1967

== Soundtrack ==
Vasantha Sena

Film score by S. Rajeswara Rao
- Released: 1967
- Genre: Soundtrack
- Length: 32:31
- Producer: S. Rajeswara Rao

S. Rajeswara Rao chronology
Gruhalakshmi (1967)	Vasantha Sena (1967)	Poola Rangadu (1967)

Music composed by S. Rajeswara Rao. Music released on Audio Company.

S. No.	Song title	Lyrics	Singers	length
1	"Oha Vasantha Yaamini"	C. Narayana Reddy	P. B. Sreenivas	3:25
2	"Bangaru Bandilo"	Dasaradhi	B. Vasantha	2:34
3	"Yemivvagalanu Danara"	Dasaradhi	P. Susheela	3:07
4	"Kila Kila Nagavula"	Dasaradhi	Ghantasala	3:10
5	"Edevela Naa Valapu"	Sri Sri	Ghantasala, S. Janaki	3:37
6	"Iddariki Eedu Joodu"	Kosaraju	Madhavapeddi Satyam, Swarnalata	2:56
7	"Digara Digara"	Kosaraju	S. Janaki, P. Leela	3:21
8	"O Sundari Kondalanni Vedikenu"	Dasaradhi	Ghantasala, S. Janaki	3:34
9	"Eduru Eduru Chuchina Reyi"	Dasaradhi	P. Susheela	3:11
10	"Vasantha Sumame"	Sri Sri	Madhavapeddi Satyam	3:36
