= Paculla Annia =

Campanian priestess

Paculla Annia was a Campanian priestess of Bacchus. She is known only through the Roman historian Livy's account of the introduction, growth and spread of unofficial Bacchanalia festivals, which were ferociously suppressed in 186 BC under threat of extreme penalty.

Paculla Annia is said to have presided over the corruption of Bacchus's mystery cult and its holy orgia, starting around 188. Livy describes the Bacchanalia as hitherto reserved to women, a daylight ritual held on just three days of the year; Paculla Annia changed them to nocturnal rites, increased their frequency to five a month, opened them to all social classes and both sexes - starting with her own sons, Minius and Herennius Cerrinius - and made wine-fueled violence and sexual promiscuity mandatory for all initiates. The cult was thought to function as a hidden state within the state, and according to Livy, with particular appeal to those with leuitas animi (fickle or uneducated minds); the lower classes, plebeians, women, the young, morally weak, and "men most like women" were thought most susceptible but even men of the highest class were not immune.

A virtuous ex-initiate and prostitute, Hispala Faecenia, though fearing the vengeance of the cult, revealed all to a shocked Roman Senate. Once their investigation was complete, they suppressed the cult, saving Rome from the divine wrath and disaster it would otherwise have suffered. Livy claims that six thousand were executed, and that the arrests included Paculla's son, Minius Cerrineus. The legislation against the cult, or rather its forced reformation, is given in the Senatus consultum de Bacchanalibus. Paculla's fate is unknown.

Most modern scholarship agrees that Dionysiac or Bacchic mystery cults had been practiced in Roman Italy for several decades before 186, and were considered acceptable by Roman authorities until this abrupt "discovery" and rapid suppression. Paculla Annia is unlikely to have introduced all the changes attributed to her by Livy; many of his dramatis personae, stylistic flourishes and tropes may draw more on Roman satyr plays than on the Bacchanalia themselves. Hispala Faecenia provides the dramatic trope of "golden-hearted prostitute", whose courageous testimony, goodness, and loyalty far outweigh her low origin, profession and fear of reprisal. Fontaine, assuming Plautus's Truculentus as contemporary with or no earlier than the events of 186, speculates its plot, themes and central character, the greedy, scheming, "evil courtesan" Phrynesium, arch-manipulator of men, as a "thinly veiled and politically conservative allegory" of Paculla Annia and her involvement with the Bacchanalia, particularly her illicit introduction of men into the cult, and its challenge to an established order and rule.

The Senatus consultum de Bacchanalibus has been interpreted as an assertion of Rome's civil and religious authority, either throughout the Italian peninsula or within Roman territories, following the recent Punic War and subsequent social and political instability. Illicit Bacchanals persisted covertly for many years, particularly in Southern Italy, their likely place of origin.
