= Vasantsena (1942 film) =

- Directed by: Gajanan Jagirdar
- Written by: Mṛcchakatika by Śūdraka
- Produced by: Acharya Atre
- Starring: Gajanan Jagirdar; Shahu Modak; Vanamala
- Release date: 1942
- Country: India
- Language: Hindi

Vasantsena is a 1942 Indian Hindi-language film produced by Atre Pictures, a new production company in Mumbai at the time. The movie cost ₹800,000, making it a blockbuster. It was released on Friday 30 October 1942 and was directed by Gajanan Jagirdar. In spite of resistance from other producers towards Atre Pictures, the film was successful.

It is based on age old Sanskrit classic Mṛcchakatika written by King Shudraka in 3rd century. The story revolves around Chatudatta, who has lost his wealth and his consort Vasantsena.
