= Bacchanalia (Rubens) =

Painting by Peter Paul Rubens

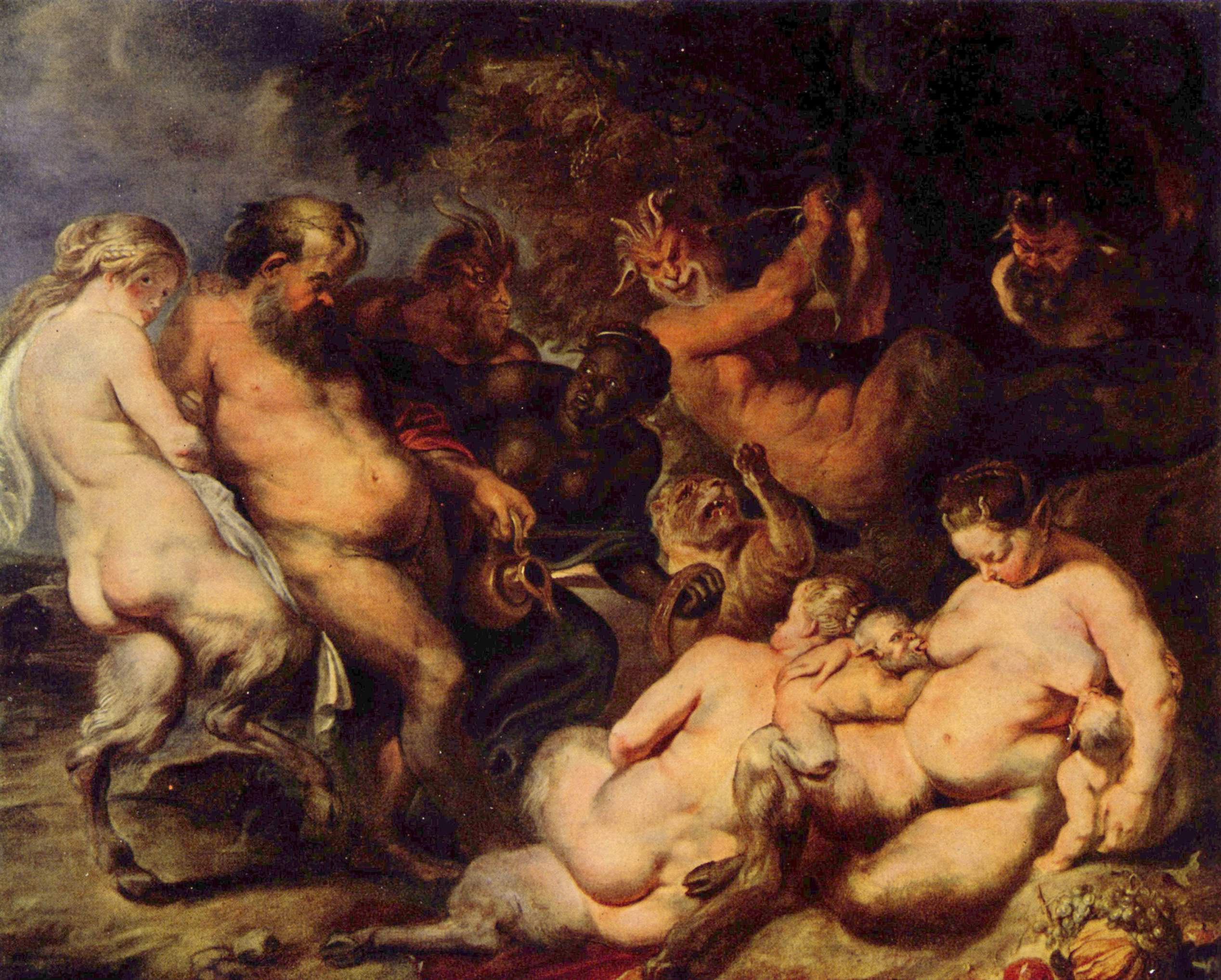
- Artist: Peter Paul Rubens
- Year: c. 1615
- Medium: Oil on canvas panel
- Movement: Baroque
- Location: Pushkin Museum; Moscow

Bacchanalia is a c. 1615 oil painting of Bacchus, Silenus, bacchantes and satyrs by Peter Paul Rubens. Originally painted on panel, it was transferred to canvas by A. Sidorov in 1892.

Rubens frequently returned to the theme of Bacchus, such as in his Drunken Hercules (1612-1618, Gemäldegalerie, Dresden) Young Bacchus Supported by Two Satyrs (post 1614, now lost but known through the engraving of Jonas Suyderhoef CG Voorhelm-Schneevoogt's engraving in Catalog des estampes gravees d'apres PP Rubens, Haarlem 1875, p. 133.), Sylvester's Retinue (1618, Alte Pinakothek, Munich) and the studio work Bacchanalia (1612-1614, Palazzo Durazzo-Pallavicini, Genoa). They all draw on classical art, particularly a relief sculpture of a drunken Hercules and Bacchic sarcophagi scenes - one of the latter is now in Moscow and was known to Rubens, who based a sketch entitled Drunken Heracles with a Faun on it.

It was recorded in 1735 in Robert Walpole's collection at Houghton Hall until was bought for the Hermitage Museum in 1779. It would be transferred to the Pushkin Museum in 1930.

== See also ==
- Drunken Hercules (after Rubens)
