= A Bacchanalian Revel Before a Term =

Painting by Nicolas Poussin

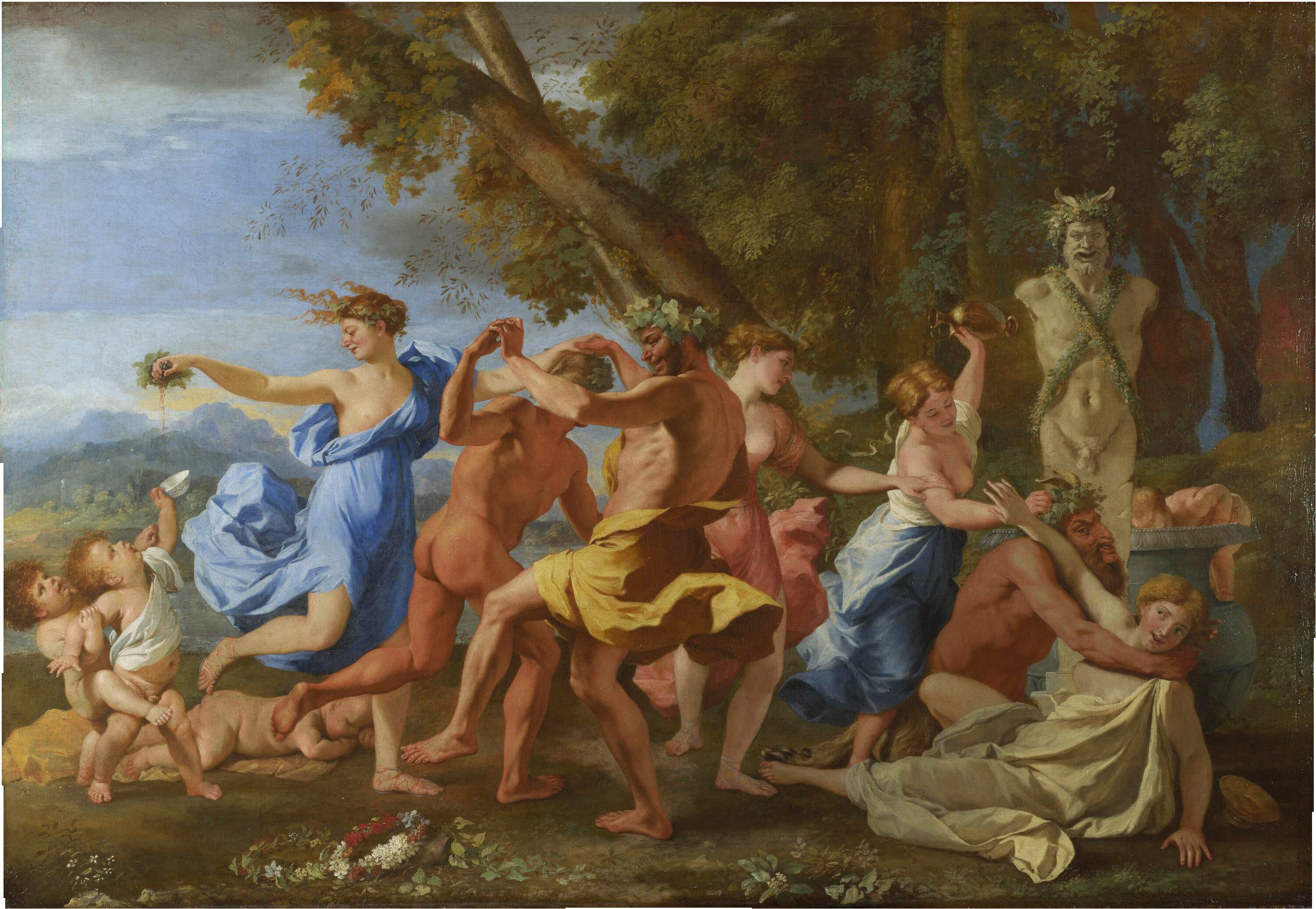
- Artist: Nicolas Poussin
- Year: 1632-1633
- Medium: oil on canvas
- Dimensions: 98 cm × 142.8 cm (39 in × 56.2 in)
- Location: National Gallery; London

A Bacchanalian Revel Before a Term (Note: Also catalogued as A Bacchanalian Dance and Revel in Honour of Pan (Smith, 1837), Bacchanal before a Herm (Blunt, 1966), Bacchanal before a Term of Pan (Wright, 1985), and otherwise.) is an oil painting by Nicolas Poussin, dated to 1632–1633. It is now in the National Gallery, in London.

== Description ==
The principal group consists of two nymphs (Note: Or perhaps maenads, the revelrous followers of Bacchus.) and two fauns (emblem of the four seasons), dancing joyously in a ring. While thus performing their rounds, one of the former is squeezing the juice of grapes from her hand on two bacchanalian boys, who are struggling together to catch it; a third, overcome with its potent effects, lies asleep near them. In the opposite side is a term (Note: Traditionally identified as a statue of Pan, but could also represent Priapus. Sometimes called a Herm.) adorned with flowers, in front of which is a satyr endeavouring to embrace a nymph who in her struggles has fallen. One of her companions has seized the sylvan by the horn, and is about to inflict a blow on him with an empty golden vase, but is prevented by the prostrate female, and also by one of the dancers. A thick grove bounds the view on this side and on the other is a rocky landscape represented under the aspect of a fine evening.

Smith (1837) comments, "This chef d'œuvre of art is a highly classic and poetical exposition of the mystic rites of the sylvan deity". On the other hand, Wright (1985) considers this picture "One of Poussin's few attempts at the genuinely humorous."

== Provenance ==
- Collection of M. Randon de Boisset, 1777.
- Count de Vaudreuil, 1786.
- M. de Calonne, London, 1795.
- Richard Walker, Esq., 1803.
- Lord Kinnaird, 1813; purchased prior to the sale, by Thomas Hamlet, Esq., who, in 1826, sold it, together with the Bacchus and Ariadne, by Titian; and Christ appearing with his Cross to St. Peter, by Caracci, to the Directors of the National Gallery.

== See also ==
- List of paintings by Nicolas Poussin

== Bibliography ==
- Blunt, Anthony (1966). The Paintings of Nicolas Poussin. Critical Catalogue. London: Phaidon. pp. 101–102 (no. 141).
- Smith, John (1837). A Catalogue Raisonné of the Works of the Most Eminent Dutch, Flemish and French Painters: Nicholas Poussin, Claude Lorraine, and Jean Baptist Greuze. Vol. 8. London: Smith and Son. pp. 116–117 (no. 221).
- Wright, Christopher (1985). Poussin. Paintings. A Catalogue Raisonné. England: Harlequin Books. p. 176 (no. 79).
- Wright, Christopher (2007). Poussin. Paintings. A Catalogue Raisonné. London: Chaucer Press. pp. 117–118 (no. 79).
