= Hispala Faecenia =

Ancient Roman freedwoman and rich courtesan

Hispala Faecenia was a freedwoman and rich courtesan from ancient Rome involved in giving a testimony that helped put a stop to the Bacchanalian scandal of 186 BCE. Hispala's role in the Bacchanalian scandal was to provide information on exactly what happened at the Bacchanalia.

== Sources ==
Most of what is known about Hispala Faecenia comes from Livy, in book 39 of his History of Rome. Livy describes her as a freedwoman and rich courtesan, who managed her wealth by herself after she was released from slavery.

== Life ==
=== Profession ===
Livy claims that Hispala was a well known courtesan and does not hide her client/prostitute relationship with Aebutius. However, Hispala supports Aebutius by paying him for sexual services. The reason why Hispala was honourable in Livy's eyes in spite of her profession was because she made a confession in front of a consul with appropriate attitude, and because this in turn triggered the repression of the Bacchanalia. This explains why Livy presents her as favourably known (nobile).

=== Relationships ===
Hispala met and fell in love with Publius Aebutius, a notable higher class individual who lived in her neighbourhood, through her work as a courtesan. Livy says that the couple had a really deep connection with one another. He goes on to say that Hispala was a generous woman that took care of Aebutius. It is mentioned that Hispala's patron had died, leaving her unguarded. It is also said that because of the couple's fondness of one another, Hispala tried to reason with the Tribunes and Praetors for a temporary guardian when drawing up her will; women could not draw up a will without a man. After this, Hispala made Aebutius her heir, meaning everything passed on to him when she was to die. To follow this, Aebutius tells Hispala of his mother's and stepfather's plan of wanting him to join the Cult of Bacchus as an initiate. Because Hispala supposedly loved Aebutius, Livy says that she exclaimed “May the gods will more favorably!” and “your stepfather is in haste to destroy, by that act, your chastity, your character, your hopes, and your life” when she found out about the ordeal. Hispala explained to Aebutius that she used to belong as a servant for her mistress Paculla Annia in the cult, but earned her freedom and never once returned. Hispala would not stop trying to convince Aebutius to not take part in the initiation until he had promised her he would not participate in the rituals/rites.

On another note, Nousek claims that Aebutius and Hispala's relationship may have come from a Roman drama.

=== Role in the Bacchanalian scandal ===
Livy claims that after Hispala refused to stop until Aebutius promised he would not join in the Bacchanalia, he went home and told his parents that he would not join as an initiate. Aebutius is kicked out of the house which results in him going to his aunt Aebutia's house. Both Aebutius and Aebutia go to tell the Consul Spurius Postumius of what goes on in the Cult of Bacchus's initiations. After this, Postumius confronts Sulpicia, Aebutius’ aunt and sends for Hispala to clarify the exact things that went on in the initiation rites. Hispala is nervous and very anxious about being called for because Sulpicia is a high class woman. Upon arrival at the house, Sulpicia, Postumius, and Hispala go elsewhere inside the home to discuss the initiation rites; Postumius requires information from Hispala on the Bacchanalia. Livy claims that Hispala said the following words in her testimony:

Those rites were performed by women. No man used to be admitted. They had three stated days in the year on which persons were initiated among the Bacchanalians, in the daytime. The matrons used to be appointed priestesses, in rotation. Paculla Minia, a Campanian, when priestess, made an alteration in every particular, as if by the direction of the Gods. For she first introduced men; changed the time of celebration, from day to night; and, instead of three days in a year, appointed 5 days of initiation in each month. From the time that the rites thus made common, and men were intermixed with women, and the licentious freedom of the night was added, there was nothing wicked, nothing flagitious, that had not been practiced among them. There was more frequent pollution of men with each other than with women. If any were less patient in submitting to this dishonour, or more averse to the commission of vice, they were sacrificed as victims. To think nothing unlawful was the grand maxim of their religion. The men, as if bereft of reason, uttered predictions, with frantic contortions of their bodies; The women, in the habit of Bacchantes, with their hair dishevelled, and carrying blazing torches, ran down to the Tiber, where, dipping their torches in the water, they drew them up again with the flame unextinguished, being composed of native sulphur and charcoal. Their number was exceedingly great now, almost a second state in themselves, and among them were many men and women of noble families.

Hispala's testimony resulted in the Bacchanalian rites to be reformed to a very large extent. By giving useful information to Postumius which helped to put a stop to the Bacchanalian Scandal, Hispala was rewarded by the Senate. Livy says that she received 100,000 asses, received the ability to alienate whatever property she owned by gift or deed, could marry a patrician man, choose a guardian, marry a patrician man that no shame would fall upon because of her status and job, and finally said that the Consuls and Praetors in office would protect her so she could go about a life of peace and quiet; this reward was because she had broken her vow of secrecy.

On a similar note, Nousek claims that when being questioned Hispala was interrogated for affirmation on what happened at the rites, while Aebutius' answers are just accepted by Postumius.

==== On Hispala's rewards ====
Hispala received rewards for helping put a stop to the Bacchanalian Scandal. The reward of enuptio gentis was not possible for Hispala to receive because she was a slave. According to Watson, Hispala didn't need the right to choose her tutor because her current tutor didn't interfere with her; the right to choose her tutor was a pointless reward. Watson goes on to say, Hispala was given the reward to marry a patrician man that no shame would come to. This reward however only meant that if she did, it would remove any legal stain and the social stigma would still remain because of her profession regardless. Watson says that the rewards given to Aebutius and Hispala were practically offensive and pointless.

== Name and given title ==
According to Livy in Walsh's article, the name Hispala may come from Spanish origin and that it was most likely given to her by her previous owner. Livy refers to Hispala's title scortum nobile libertina, which means prostitute noble freedwoman.

Kajanto says that there is a possibility that Hispala Faecenia, the woman, originated from the Italian countryside. Kajanto also makes note of the only known possible derivatives of her name being Cornelius Scipio Hispallus and Hispo, but it is highly unlikely. He makes note of the possibility that Hispala name was unrecorded as a woman's praenomen.

== Patron ==
Hispala's patron may have descended from the same gentes as Aebutius and his family. Musial also claims that Hispala's patrons name was Faecenius and that he did not leave behind an heir.

== In popular culture ==
Hispala is featured in the 2023 book A Rome of One's Own: The Forgotten Women of the Roman Empire, by Emma Southon.
