= Vasantasena (1941 film) =

Vasantsena
- Film poster
- Directed by: Ramaier; Shirur
- Screenplay by: R. Nagendra Rao
- Story by: Śūdraka
- Based on: Mṛcchakatika by Śūdraka
- Produced by: Meyappa Chettiar; R. Nagendra Rao; Subbaiah Naidu
- Starring: Lakshmi Bai; Subbaiah Naidu; R. Nagendra Rao
- Cinematography: D. S. Kotnis
- Edited by: M. V. Raman
- Music by: Padmanabhashastri; B. Devendrappa
- Distributed by: Pragathi Pictures
- Release date: 1941
- Running time: 165 minutes
- Country: India
- Language: Kannada

Vasantasena is a 1941 Indian Kannada-language film directed by Ramayyar Shirur. It stars Lakshmi Bai, Subbayya Naidu and Nagendra Rao in lead roles. The film is based on the Sanskrit play, Mṛcchakatika by Śūdraka.

== Cast ==
- Lakshmi Bai as Vasantasena
- Subbaiah Naidu as Charudatta
- R. Nagendra Rao as Sakara
- S. K. Padmadevi as Madanika
- Chandramma as Dhoota Devi
- Sarojamma as Radhanika
- Baby Vinoda as Rohasena
- G. V. Krishnamurthy Rao as Maitreya
- G. R. Sandow as Kotwal

== Soundtrack ==
The music of the film was composed by P Kalinga Rao, Saraswathi Stores Orchestra, H R Padmanabha Shashtri, B.Devendrappa with lyrics for the soundtracks written by Ramakrishna Sastry and R Nagendra Rao.

Kannada
No.	Title	Singer(s)	Length
1.	"Nijamanava Namma Pathiye"	Lakshmi Bai
2.	"Ramaneeya Naamavu"	Lakshmi Bai
3.	"Deena Jana Mandaara"	M. V. Subbaiah Naidu
4.	"Athi Mudadali Nali Naliva"	M. V. Subbaiah Naidu, Kamalabai
5.	"Bhale Bhale Joojugaaranala"	Lakshmi Bai
6.	"Ide Mahasudina"	M. V. Subbaiah Naidu, Lakshmi Bai
7.	"Kaamanu Kaaduva Kothiya Haage"	R Nagendra Rao
8.	"Dharmake Jayavu Sathya"	P Kalinga Rao
