= Bhana =

One act monologue Sanskrit plays

Bhana or bhāṇa (Sanskrit: भाण) are one-act monologue Sanskrit plays.

In the Vedic literature, there are several references to singing, dancing, music and entertaining performances by professional entertainers. In the Rig Veda there are mantras with pronounced story element in dialogue form – dramatic soliloquy, dialogue and chorus, traditionally known as Akhyana which fact points at the existence of some kind of drama-entertainment e.g. "The Repentant Gambler" Rig Veda X.3.5, "The Frog Play" (Rig Veda VII.6), "Yama and Yami" Rig VedaX.1, "Chorus" Rig Veda IX.11. Some scholars think that such dramatic hymns were enacted by the priests at the time of Yajna ceremonies; it is possible that the drama proper emanated from the rituals then performed. Bhāna Padataditakam set in the city of Ujjayani describes Bhāṇa plays as Eka Nata Nātak or single actor play.

As per the rules laid down by Bharata in the 4th or the 5th century A.D., Bhāṇa, described by him in Chapter 19 of Nātyaśastra, is a monologue spoken by a dissolute hero called viṭa, dialogue is simulated by having the viṭa respond to imagined voices or asking questions of unseen characters and repeating their answers to the audience; Bharata insists that plays of this type should contain the elements of a kind of dance called the lāsya but did not favour the graceful style called kaiśikī vṛtti, which allows for love and gallantry. Many centuries later, Dhananjaya specified that a bhāṇa should be rendered in the bhāratī vṛtti and that the heroic (vīra) and erotic (śṛṅgāra) sentiments should prevail but like Bharata did not make specific mention of the comic element; bhāratī vṛtti suggests the comic element and allows kaiśikī vṛtti.

Abhinavagupta states that bhānas are chronicles of prostitutes and men who live by their wit. Kohala is of the view that the bhānas should have only śṛṅgārarasa. Saradātanaya states:

कोहलादिभिराचर्यैरुक्तं भाणस्य लक्षणम् |
लास्यङ्ग्दशकोपेतं ..... ||

"The characteristics of bhāna are described by experts such as Kohala and others as being arrived at by ten lāsyāṅgas (the traditional forms of dance)……… "

Śārṅgadeva defines lāsya as a delicate dance that stimulates erotic sentiments. From bhāṇas there developed two minor dramatic types – bhāṇaka and bhāṇikā or bhāna and bhāni.

Early Nāṭyaśāstra tradition describes eleven genres of Sanskrit dramas, and Bhāṇa is one of them; these genres had evolved around different cultural and social settings representing diverse patronage. Bhāṇa is a single act play with two conjectures or sandhis – the opening and the conclusion; it is a drama where a single actor creates a number of characters and episodes by his mono-acting. In this genre, the plot is invented and usually deals with a gallant parasite (viṭa) who goes on an errand to appease a courtesan ladylove his noble friend. All en route happenings are narrated with ingenious techniques of ekāhārya abhinaya (the adoption of characters without the change of costumes or get-up) resorting to the stage convention of ākāśa bhāṣita (speech in the air) to hold forth conversations with imaginary characters who are not seen on the stage.

In the Brihadaranyaka Upanishad verse I.ii.4,

तं जातमभिव्याददात्स भाणमकरोत्सैव वागभवत् ||

"He (the Destroyer) went towards him, with his mouth open, as if to devour him. He (Brahmā) made the sound 'Bhāṇa' (God, the omniscient and all-bliss). (Simultaneously) speech arose."

the term Bhāṇam (भाणम) refers to the sound bhān uttered by Brahman. The sound comprises Bhā – light and knowledge and na – bliss or joy, and also refers to Bhagavān (The Lord). Simultaneous with the utterance, speech arose, signifying the creation of the world.
