= Mṛcchakatika =

Sanskrit play attributed to Śūdraka

Mṛcchakatika (The Little Clay Cart)
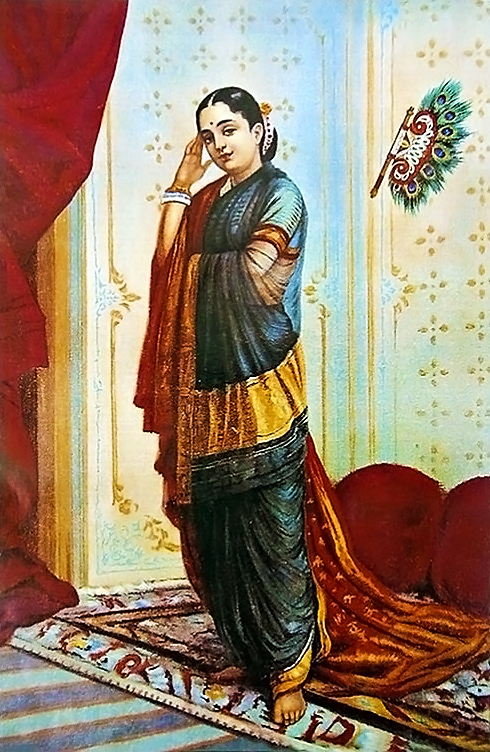
- An oleographic print depicting the female protagonist Vasantasenā, a rich courtesan.
- Original language: Sanskrit
- Written by: Śūdraka
- Characters: Cārudatta; Vasantasenā; Maitreya; Samsthānaka; Āryaka; Sarvilaka; Madanikā
- Genre: Sanskrit drama
- Setting: Ancient city of Ujjayini; Fifth century BC

Mṛcchakatika (Sanskrit: मृच्छकटिकम्, romanized: Mṛcchakaṭikam), also spelled Mṛcchakaṭikā, Mrchchhakatika, Mricchakatika, or Mrichchhakatika (The Little Clay Cart) is a ten-act Sanskrit drama attributed to Śūdraka, an ancient playwright who is possibly from the 5th century CE, and who is identified by the prologue as a Kshatriya king as well as a devotee of Shiva who lived for over 110 years. The play is set in the ancient city of Ujjayini during the reign of the King Pālaka, near the end of the Pradyota dynasty that made up the first quarter of the fifth century BCE. The central story is that of a noble but impoverished young Brahmin, Sanskrit: Cārudatta, who falls in love with a wealthy courtesan or nagarvadhu, Sanskrit: Vasantasenā. Despite their mutual affection, however, the couple's lives and love are threatened when a vulgar courtier, Samsthānaka, also known as Shakara, begins to aggressively pursue Vasantasenā.

Life with romance, comedy, intrigue and a political subplot detailing the overthrow of the city's despotic ruler by a shepherd, the play is notable among extant Sanskrit drama for its focus on a fictional scenario rather than on a classical tale or legend. Mṛcchakaṭika also departs from traditions enumerated in the Natya Shastra that specify that dramas should focus on the lives of the nobility and instead incorporates many peasant characters who speak a wide range of Prakrit dialects. The story is thought to be derived from an earlier work called Cārudatta in Poverty by the playwright Bhāsa, though that work survives only in fragments.

Of all the Sanskrit dramas, Mṛcchakaṭika remains one of the most widely celebrated and often-performed in the West. The work played a significant role in generating interest in Indian theatre among European audiences following several successful nineteenth century translations and stage productions, most notably Gérard de Nerval and Joseph Méry's highly romanticised French adaptation titled Le Chariot d'enfant that premiered in Paris in 1850, as well as a critically acclaimed "anarchist" interpretation by Victor Barrucand called Le Chariot de terre cuite that was produced by the Théâtre de l'Œuvre in 1895.

Unlike other classical plays in Sanskrit, the play does not borrow from epics or mythology. The characters of Śūdrak are drawn from the mundane world. It is peopled with gamblers, courtesans, thieves, and so on. The protagonist of the play, Cārudatta, does not belong to the noble class or royal lineage. Though Vasantasenā is a courtesan, her exemplary attitude and dignified behavior impress the audience. The nobility of the characters does not stem from their social conditioning but from their virtues and behaviour.

== Plot summary ==
Cārudatta is a central character in classical Sanskrit drama, portrayed as an impoverished Brahmin merchant residing in Ujjain. Having depleted his wealth through acts of philanthropy, civic patronage, and generosity toward friends, he remains destitute alongside his family. Despite his financial ruins and subsequent abandonment by former associates, Cārudatta retains a reputation within Ujjain for integrity, wisdom and moral uprightness, with prominent citizens continuing to consult him on matters of counsel.

Though happily married and the recent father of a young son, Rohasena, Cārudatta is enamored of Vasantasenā, a courtesan of great wealth and reputation. At a chance encounter at the temple of Kāma she returns his affection, though the matter is complicated when Vasantasenā finds herself pursued by Samsthānaka, a half-mad brother-in-law of King Pālaka, and his retinue. When the men threaten violence, Vasantasenā flees, seeking safety with Cārudatta. Their love blossoms following the clandestine meeting, and the courtesan entrusts her new lover with a casket of jewelry in an attempt to ensure a future meeting.

Her plan is thwarted, however, when a thief, Sarvilaka, enters Cārudatta’s home and steals the jewels in an elaborate scheme to buy the freedom of his lover, Madanikā, who is Vasantasenā’s slave and confidante. The courtesan recognizes the jewelry, but she accepts the payment anyway and frees Madanikā to marry. She then attempts to contact Cārudatta and inform him of the situation, but before she can make contact he panics and sends Vasantasenā a rare pearl necklace that had belonged to his wife, a gift in great excess of the value of the stolen jewelry. In recognition of this, Cārudatta's friend, Maitreya, cautions the Brahmin against further association, fearing that Vasantasenā is, at worst, scheming to take from Cārudatta the few possessions he still has and, at best, a good-intentioned bastion of bad luck and disaster.

Refusing to take this advice, Cārudatta makes Vasantasenā his mistress and she eventually meets his young son. During the encounter, the boy is distressed because he has recently enjoyed playing with a friend's toy cart of solid gold and no longer wants his own clay cart that his nurse has made for him. Taking pity on him, Vasantasenā fills his little clay cart with her own jewelry, heaping his humble toy with a mound of gold before departing to meet Cārudatta in a park outside the city for a day’s outing. There she enters a fine carriage, but soon discovers that she is in a gharry belonging to Samsthānaka, who remains enraged by her previous affront and is madly jealous of the love and favour she shows to Cārudatta. Unable to persuade his henchmen to kill her, Samsthānaka sends his retinue away and proceeds to strangle Vasantasenā and hide her body beneath a pile of leaves. Still seeking vengeance, he promptly accuses Cārudatta of the crime.

Though Cārudatta proclaims his innocence, his presence in the park along with his son's possession of Vasantasenā's jewels implicate the poverty-stricken man, and he is found guilty and condemned to death by King Pālaka. Unbeknownst to all, however, the body identified as Vasantasenā’s was actually another woman. Vasantasenā had been revived and befriended by a Buddhist monk who nursed her back to health in a nearby village.

Just as Cārudatta faces execution, Vasantasenā appears and, seeing the excited crowd, intervenes in time to save him from execution and his wife from throwing herself onto his funeral pyre. Together the three declare themselves a family. Reaching the courts, Vasantasenā tells the story of her near death and, following her testimony, Samsthānaka is arrested and the good Prince Āryaka deposes the wicked King Pālaka. His first acts as the newly declared sovereign is to restore Cārudatta’s fortune and make him the king of Kusavati. Following this good will, Cārudatta demonstrates in the final act his enduring virtue and charity, appealing to the King for pardon on behalf of Samsthānaka who is subsequently declared free. The Buddhist monk who saved the life of Vasantasenā is made the chief of all Vihars. Vasantasena is given the title of a wife. Everybody is happy, nobody has any grouse.

== Characters ==
- Cārudatta, an impoverished young Brahmin
- Vasantasenā, a courtesan in love with Cārudatta
- Maitreya, a poor Brahmin, Cārudatta’s friend
- Vardhamānaka, a servant in Cārudatta's house
- Radanikā, a maid in Cārudatta's house
- Dhuta, wife of Cārudatta
- Rohasena, Cārudatta's son
- Viṭa, a courtier in service of Vasantasenā
- Madanikā, Vasantasenā’s maidservant and confidant
- Mother of Vasantasenā
- Karnapūraka and Kumbhīlaka, Vasantasenā's servants
- Bastard pages in Vasantasenā's house
- King Pālaka
- Samsthānaka, Brother to one of the King's concubines also called sakaara
- Vita, a courtier in service of Samsthānaka
- Sthāvaraka, Samsthānaka's servant
- Āryaka, a herdsman and prince in exile who becomes king
- Sarvilaka, a Brahmin who became a thief to free his love Madanikā
- Māthura, a gambling-master
- Darduraka, a gambler, friend to Sarvilaka
- Vīraka and Chandanaka, captains of the civil guard, friends to Sarvilaka
- Gōha and Ahīnta, executioners
- Former masseur of Cārudatta who becomes a Buddhist monk
- Judge
- Scribe
- Citizens, slaves, and attendants

== Media ==
- Play adaptions: The play was translated into English, notably by Arthur W. Ryder in 1905 as The Little Clay Cart. (It had previously been translated as The Toy Cart by Horace Hayman Wilson in 1826.) Ryder's version was enacted at the Hearst Greek Theatre in Berkeley in 1907, and in New York City in 1924 at the Neighborhood Playhouse, which was then an off-Broadway theatre, at the Theater de Lys in 1953, and at the Potboiler Art Theater in Los Angeles in 1926, when it featured actors such as James A. Marcus, Symona Boniface and Gale Gordon. The play has been adapted in several Indian languages and performed by various theatre groups and directors, like Habib Tanvir.
- Film adaptations:
  - Mrichha Katika, a silent film by Suchet Singh made in 1920.
  - Vasantsena, a silent film by Dadasaheb Phalke made in 1929.
  - Vasantasena, starring Kamaladevi Chattopadhyay, first silent film of Kannada cinema, made in 1931.
  - Vasantsena, a film by Jagatrai Pesumal Advani made in 1934.
  - Vasantasena, an Indian Tamil film by Raja Sandow P.K. made in 1936.
  - Vasantha Sena, a Kannada film by Ramayyar Shirur made in 1941.
  - Vasantsena, a Hindi film by Gajanan Jagirdar in 1942.
  - Sadhna, a Hindi film by B. R. Chopra in 1958.
  - Vasantha Sena, a Telugu film by B. S. Ranga in 1967.
  - Utsav, a 1984 Hindi erotic drama film by Girish Karnad.
  - Vasantha Sena, a 1985 Malayalam film by K. Vijayan.
