= Vasantasena =

Character from Mṛichchhakatika

Vasantasena is a fictional character and the protagonist of the iconic Sanskrit play Mṛichchhakatika (The Little Clay Cart) written by Śūdraka.

Mricchakatika was translated in 1826 as The Toy Cart by Horace Hayman Wilson, a surgeon in the East India Company. In 1847, the text was translated by the German scholar A.F Stenzler, and published in Bonn.

The play was subsequently adapted and performed widely across Europe. Many of the adaptions were titled 'Vasantasena' after the main character.

== Characters in the Play ==
The main characters in the play include:

Chārudatta: a wealthy noble-man who loses all his wealth due to his philanthropic and altruistic nature and is seriously impoverished.

Vasantasena: a wealthy courtesan(nagarvadhu) who lives a life of utmost luxury but falls in love with Chārudatta for his extremely noble nature.

Madanika: Vasantasena's attendant

Sansthanaka: the evil brother-in-law of the King Palaka; Sansthanaka fancies Vasantasena.

Aryaka: prophesied to become the King

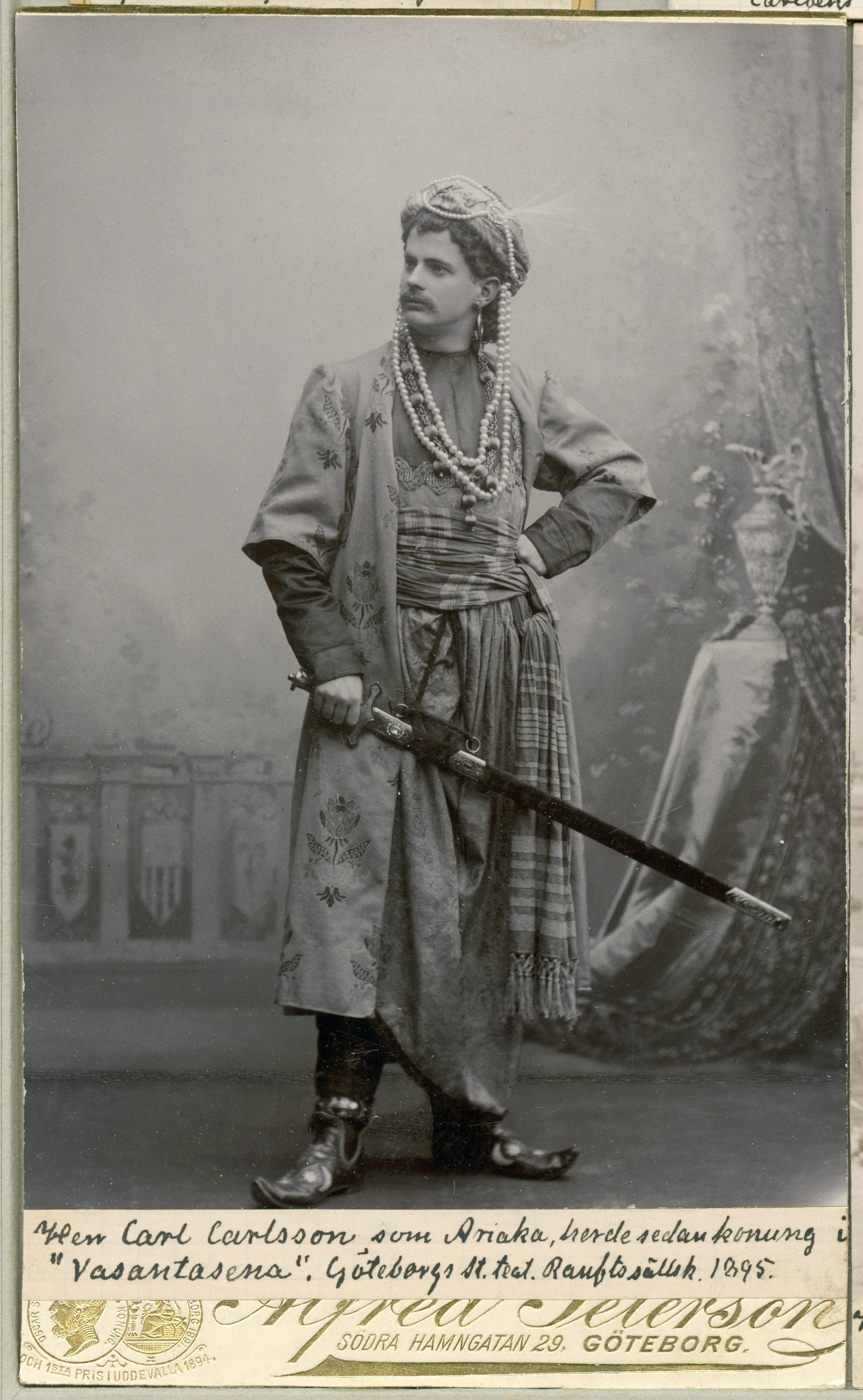

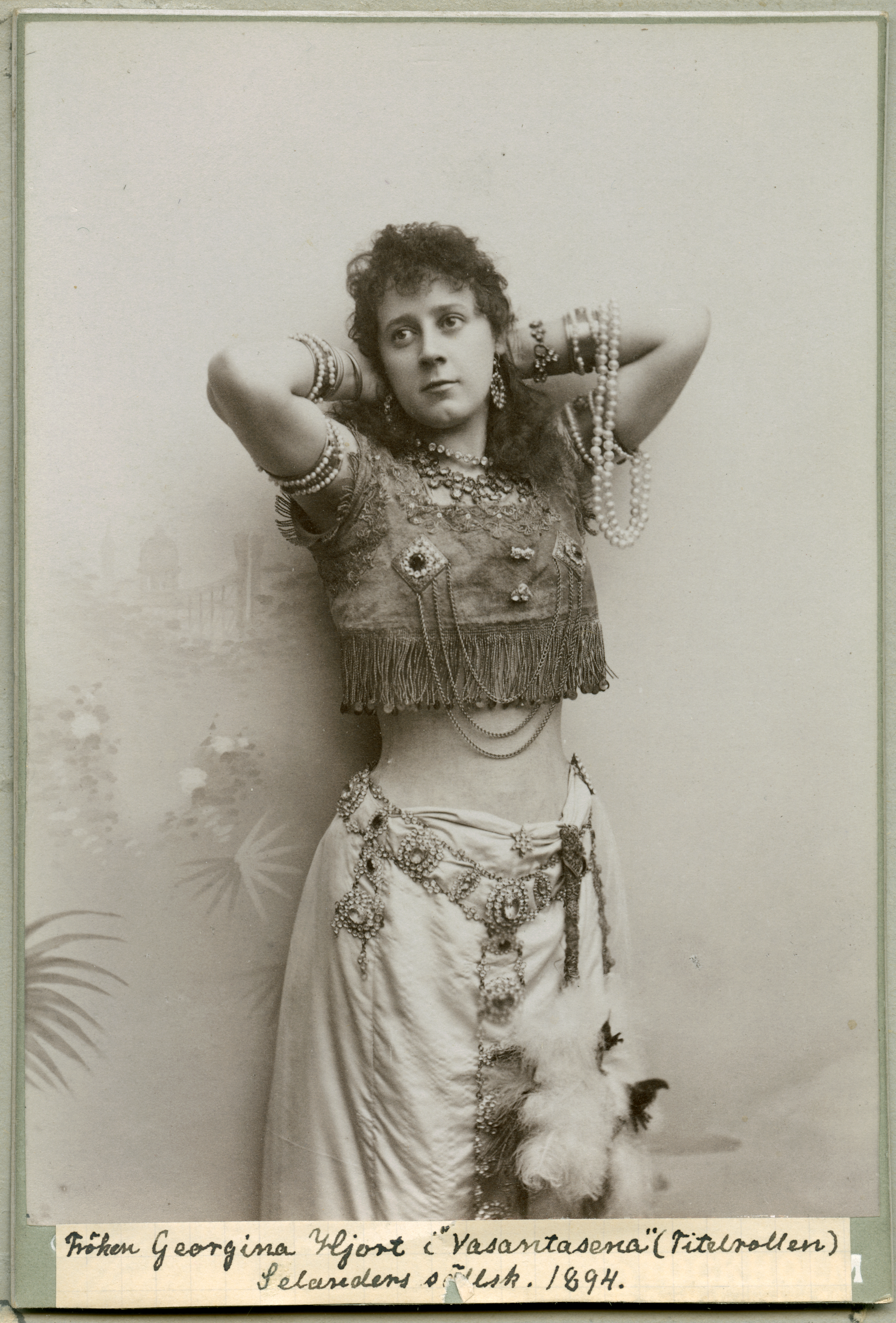

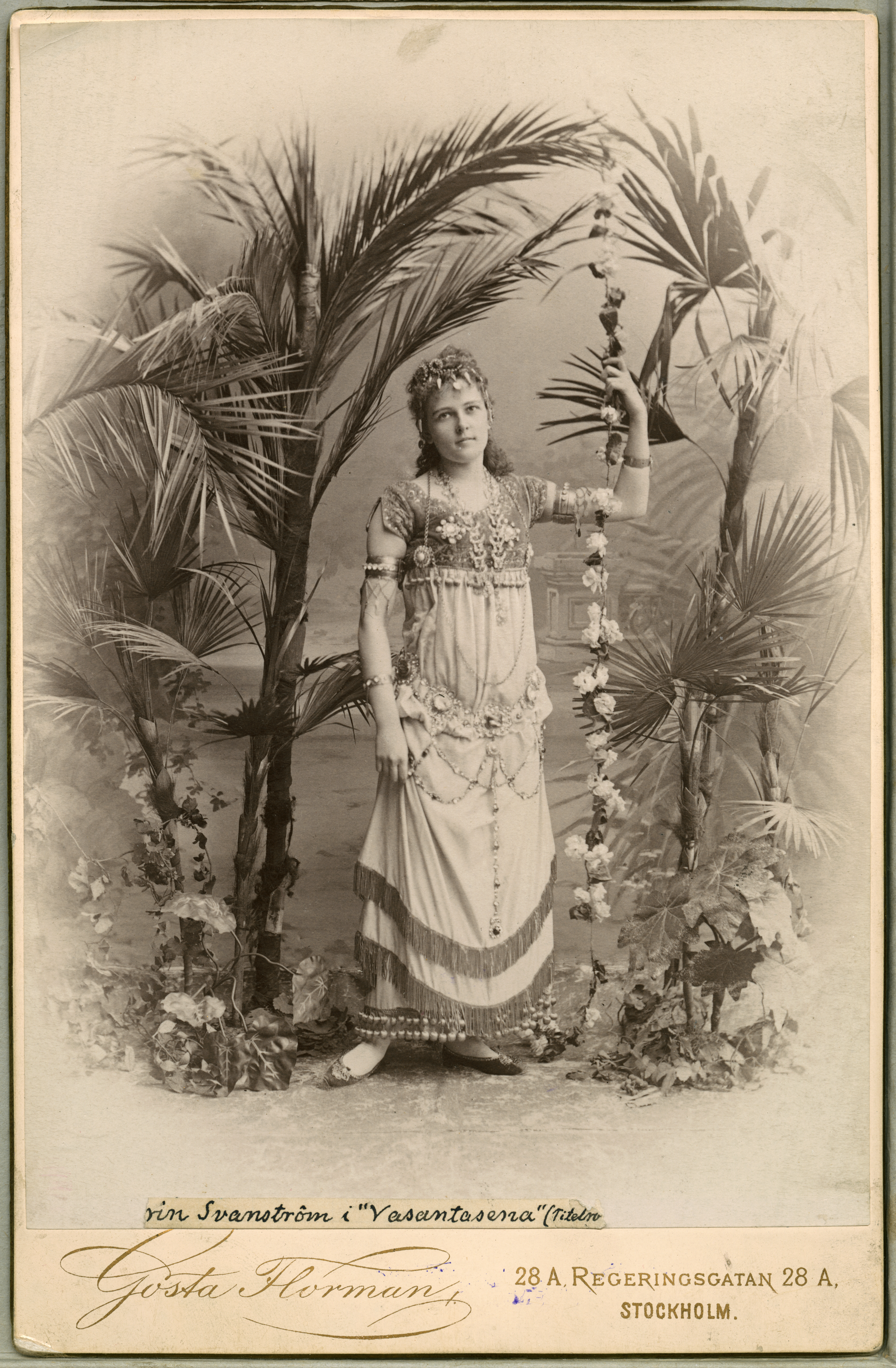

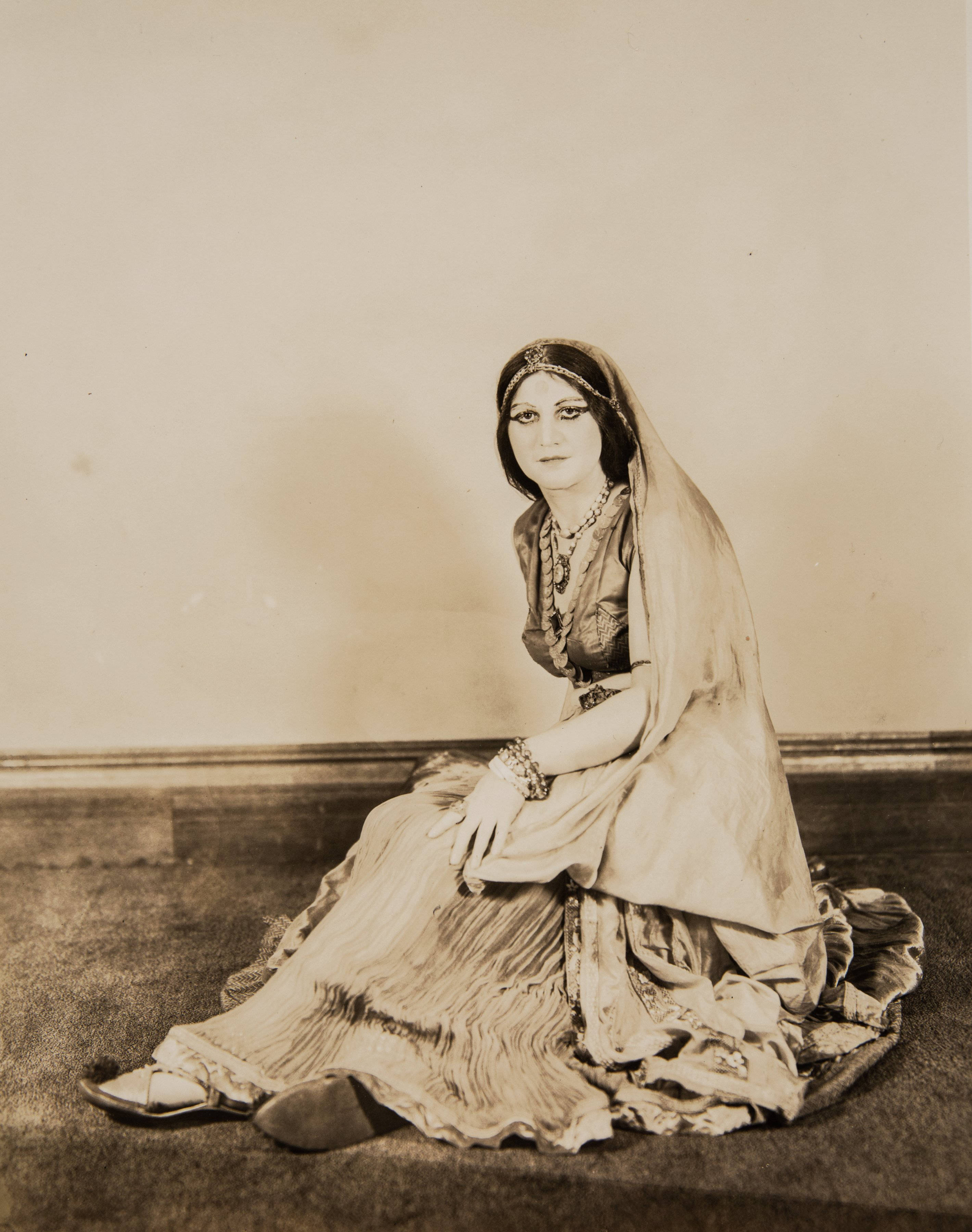

== Art and Media ==
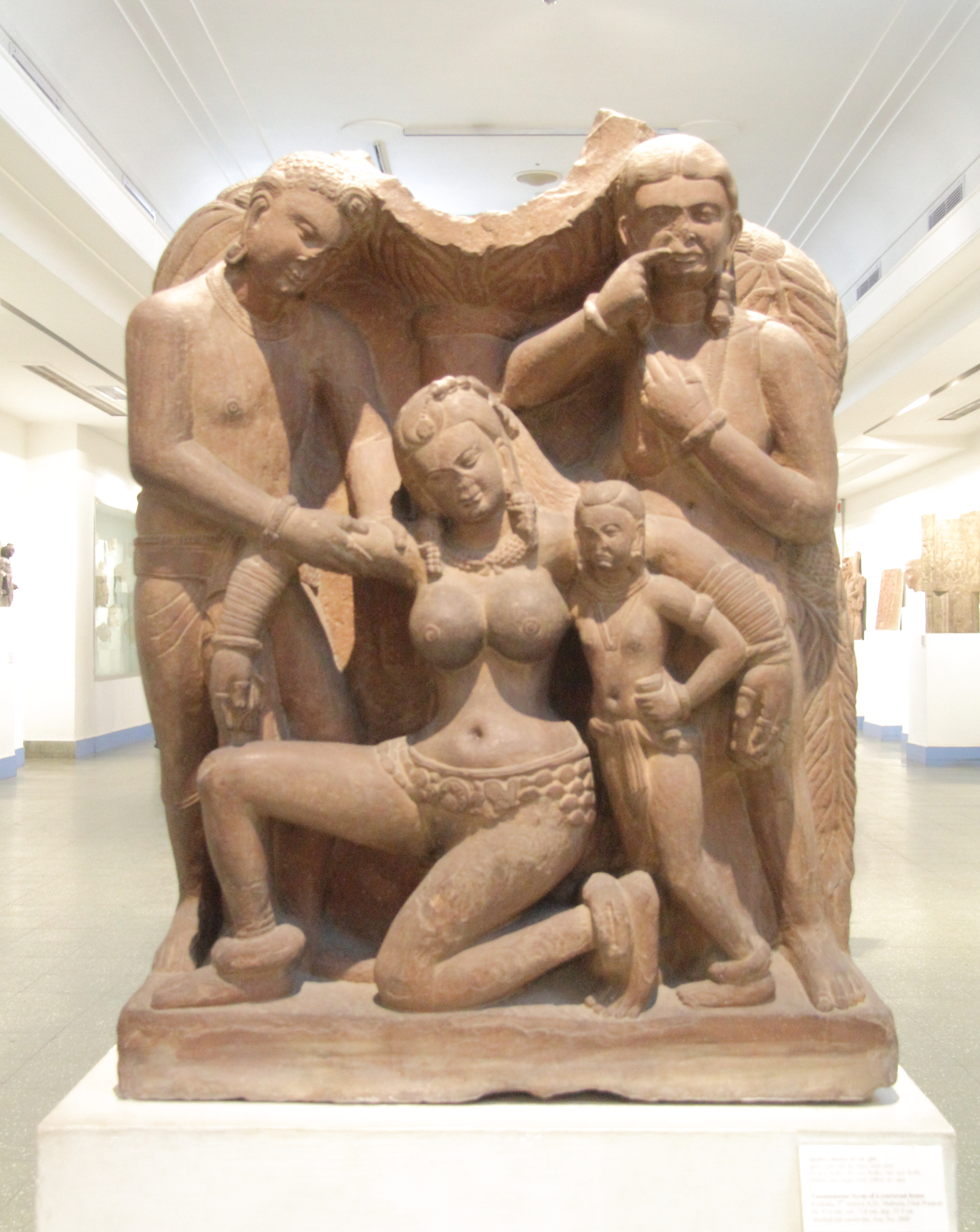
Sculpture of Vasantasena kept in National Museum, Delhi

Different works in the domain of arts and media have been produced at different points of time in history because the legend has been popular since times immemorial. Recognisable works have been listed down as follows:

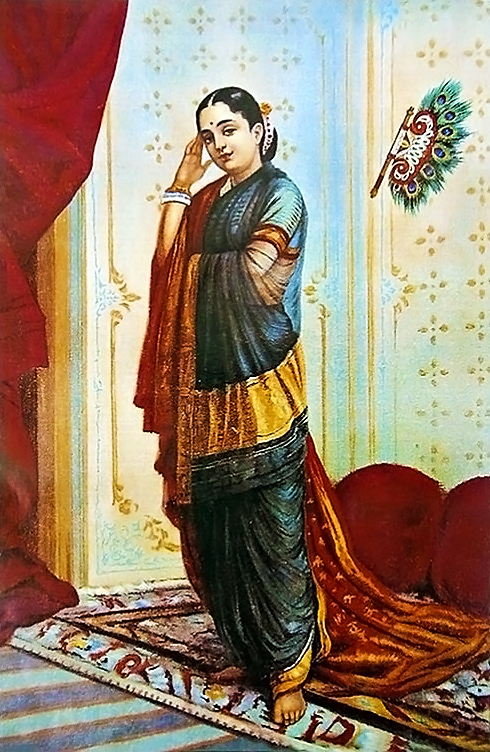
An oleographic print by Raja Ravi Varma depicting Vasantasena, the protagonist of the play Mṛcchakatika

- Painting by Abanindranath Tagore (early 1920's) / Public Domain
- Sculpture from Kushana period: A mottled red sandstone sculpture belonging to the 2nd century A.D., which depicts a Scene of a Courtesan's House. It is kept in the National Museum, Delhi.
- Oleograph by Raja Ravi Varma: The 19th-century Indian artist Raja Ravi Varma produced an oleograph depicting Vasantasena.
- Movies:
    - Vasantsena, a movie by Dadasaheb Phalke made in 1929
    - Vasantha Sena, a Kannada movie by Ramayyar Shirur made in 1941
    - Vasantha Sena, a Bollywood movie by Gajanan Jagirdar in 1942
    - Vasantha Sena, a Tollywood movie by B. S. Ranga in 1967

Utsav is a 1984 Hindi erotic drama film, produced by Shashi Kapoor and directed by Girish Karnad and is based on this play.
