= Shudraka =

Indian king and playwright

- Occupation: Playwright, poet, king
- Language: Sanskrit
- Notable works: Mrichchhakatika

Shudraka (IAST: Śūdraka) was an Indian playwright, to whom three Sanskrit plays are attributed: Mrichchhakatika (The Little Clay Cart), Vinavasavadatta, and a bhana (short one-act monologue), Padmaprabhritaka. According to the prologue of Mrichchhakatika, he was a king; according to one theory, he may have been a third century Abhira king. According to another theory, Shudraka is a mythical figure, and the authorship of plays attributed to him is uncertain. Col. Wilfred has identified him with Simuka, the founder of Satavahana dynasty and placed him in 200 B.C.

== Sources ==
In the prologue of the play Mrichchhakatika, the stage manager states that its poet was a wise king renowned as "Shudraka". He had performed Ashvamedha ritual to prove his superiority, and immolated himself aged 110 years, after crowning his son as the new king. The prologue describes him as a distinguished wise man, who had gained knowledge of the Rigveda, the Samaveda, mathematics, the Kamashastra and the art of training elephants.

Two lost works titled Shudraka-katha (IAST: Śūdraka-kathā, "the story of Shudraka") are known from other sources. A verse attributed to the 10th century poet Rajashekhara in Suktimuktavali praises two writers - Ramila and Somila - for jointly composing a novel titled Shudraka-katha. Because it is described as a novel, it was probably a work of fiction. Another Shudraka-katha, attributed to a writer called Pancha-shikha, is known from other sources.

Based on information from other sources, it appears that one Shudraka-katha (probably that of Ramila and Somila) narrated how Shudraka won over a woman called Vinaya-vati, with the help of his friend Bandhu-datta. The other work (probably that of Pancha-shika) was a Prakrit-language novel that featured a heroine named Harimati and an old parrot acting as her messenger.

Dandin's Avanti-Sundari provides a summary of the various narratives about Shudraka, probably based on these novels. Avanti-Sundari-Katha-Sara, a paraphrased version of Dandin's work, states that Shudraka was originally called Indrani-gupta. Although born in a Brahmin family, he became a warrior (Kshatriya) and acquired royal fortune.

According to Rajashekhara's Kavya-mimansa, Shudraka was reputed as a patron of literature, and presided over a literary circle. Some legends present Shudraka as a ruler of central India. E.g. the Kadambari places him in Dasharna, and the Avanti-Sundari-Katha-Sara calls him "Malava-raja" (the king of Malava). Bhoja's Shringara-Prakasha also mentions the narratives about Shudraka. Vidyapati's Purusha-pariksha contains a fanciful story that portrays Shudraka as an ideal lover.

== Identification ==
No historical records mention a king by the name Shudraka (which literally means "little servant"). The first four acts of Mrichchhakatika are virtually a copy of the corresponding acts from Bhasa's unfinished play Charudattam. One theory is that the poet of Mrichchhakatika simply finished Bhasa's play out of respect, styling himself as the "little servant" of Bhasa.

A fourteenth-century text attributes Mrichchhakatika to a duo, Bhartrimentha and Vikramaditya. The Mrichchhakatika is set in Ujjain. It is known that an Ujjain-based poet by the name Bhartrimentha was a contemporary of Kalidasa; the legendary king Vikramaditya also lived in Ujjain. However, identifying these two as the authors of Mrichchhakatika is chronologically impossible.

Indologist A. K. Warder notes that even the earliest sources that mention Shudraka present him as a legendary figure. Therefore, the existence of Shudraka is doubtful. Some scholars, such as Farley P. Richmond, suggest that Shudraka was simply a mythical figure, and the authorship of works attributed to him is uncertain.

According to another theory, first proposed by Sten Konow, Shudraka was the pen name of a 3rd century Abhira king, possibly Shivadatta, the father of Ishvarasena). This theory is supported by the following points:

- The Abhiras succeeded or supplanted the Satavahanas, who are also known as the Andhras, and who were probably overlords of the Abhiras at one time. A Skandapurana legend calls Shudraka an "Āndhrabhṛtya", meaning a vassal of the Andhras. According to the Jain tradition (e.g. Vividha-Tirtha-Kalpa), a king named Satavahana gave Shudraka half of his empire. According to other legends, such as the one mentioned in Dandin's Avanti-Sundari, Shudraka either ascended the throne after the premature death of the Satavahana prince Svati, or defeated Svati.
- Avanti-Sundari-Katha-Sara mentions that Shudraka was born in the Ashmaka region. The Vividha-Tirtha-Kalpa states that he was born in Pratishthana, which is located in the same area. Shudraka is among the earliest dramatists to use the Maharashtri Prakrit, the language of this area, in a play.
- The Skandapurana places Shudraka in the Kali year 3290, which corresponds to 188 CE, close to the Abhira period.
- Shudraka invokes the god Shiva in his play, and the Abhira names (known from their inscriptions) suggest that they were Shaivites.

== See also ==
- Sanskrit drama
- List of Sanskrit plays in English translation
