= List of Italian Renaissance courtesans =

The following is a list of notable Italian Renaissance courtesans.

== Renaissance courtesans ==
In Italian Renaissance society existed the category of a cortigiana onesta (literally, honest courtesan), who were intellectual sex workers who derived their position in society from refinement and cultural prowess. They served in contrast to other sex workers such as cortigiana di lume or meretrice ('harlots'), who were lower-class prostitutes.

In the middle of 16th century was printed "Catalogo de tutte le principal et più honorate cortigiane di Venetia" (Catalog of all the Principal and most Honored Courtesans of Venice).

== List ==
=== 15th-century ===
- Fiammetta Michaelis (it) (Rome; 1465–1512)
- Giulia Campana (Pendaglia; Ferrarese) - mother of Tullia d'Aragona.
- Imperia Cognati (Rome; 1486–1512) - one of the first famous profeccional courtesans in Renaissance.

=== 16th-century ===
- Beatrice Ferrarese (Beatrice De Bonis)
- Lucrezia Porzia ("Matrema non vòle") - Roman
- Antea
- Beatrice Pareggi (La Spagnola)
- Tullia d'Aragona (1501/1505–1556) - poet, author, and philosopher. Daughter of Giulia Campana (Pendaglia; Ferrarese)
- Camilla Pisana (Florence; fl. 1515) - poet
  - her companions Alessandra Fiorentina, Brigida, and Beatrice Ferrarese
- Angela Greca (Ortensia Greca, Grechetta) - model of Titian's "Danae", cousin of Camilla Pisana.
- Barbara Salutati (it)) (d. after 1544) - singer, poet, Machiavelli's muse
- Isabella de Luna (Rome; died 1564)
- Pandora - Isabella de Luna's companion
- Lucrezia Galletta (Rome; 1520s – 1580) - later banker
- Veronica Franco (Venice; 1546–1591) - poet
- Lucrezia Di Siena (fl. 1564) - stage actress, the first identified female actor in Europe since antiquity. Possibly worked as courtesan before stage.
- Caravaggio's models:
  - Anna Bianchini (Annuccia) (it) (c. 1579 – 1604)
  - Fillide Melandroni (Rome; 1581–1618) - courtesan
  - Maddalena (Lena) Antognetti (1579-?) (it) - prostitute
- Amabilia Antognetti
- Domenica Calvi (Menicuccia)
- Angela Del Moro (Giulia Angela, La Zaffetta)
- Giulia Lombardo
- Marietta Mirtilla del Brocardo - muse of poet Antonio Brocardo

== Fictional ==
- Pietro Aretino: "La Cortigiana" (it), 1525; Ragionamento della Nanna e della Antonia fatto a Roma sotto una ficaia (1534); Dialogo nel quale la Nanna insegna alla Pippa sua figliola (1536)
- Honoré de Balzac described a courtisan called Imperia in his 1832 story La Belle Impéria. The story plays at the time of the Council of Konstanz, 100 years before the death of Imperia Cognati.
- Balzac's figure of Imperia has been portrayed by the German painter Lovis Corinth in 1925, and inspired the 1993 larger-than-life Imperia statue in the harbour of Konstanz.

== Arts ==
- Portrait of a Courtesan (Caravaggio)
- Antea (Parmigianino)

== Books ==
- Cortigiane di Venezia: dal Trecento a l Settecento, Le, Cataloga della Mostra: Venezia, Casinò municipale, C a’ Vendramin Calergi, 2 febbraio-16 aprile 1990, Berenice, Milano 1990.
- Bassanese, Fiora A. “Private Lives and Public Lies: Texts by Courtesans of the Italian Renaissance.” Texas Studies in Literature and Language, vol. 30, no. 3, 1988, pp. 295–319.
- Boulting, William. Woman in Italy: From the Introduction of the Chivalrous Service of Love to the Appearance of the Professional Actress. 2018
- Brown, Judith. Gender and Society in Renaissance Italy (Women And Men In History)
- Budin, Stephanie Lynn. Freewomen, Patriarchal Authority, and the Accusation of Prostitution. Routledge, 2021
- Hare, Christopher. The most illustrious ladies of the Italian renaissance. Boston, 1905
- Graham, Ian. Scarlet Women: The Scandalous Lives of Courtesans, Concubines, and Royal Mistresses. 2016
- Griffin, Susan. The Book of the Courtesans: A Catalogue of Their Virtues, 2002.
- Giusti, Eugenio. The Renaissance courtesan in words, letters and images: Social amphibology and moral framing (A diachronic perspective). 2014
- Jaffe, Irma B.; Colombardo, Gernando. Shining Eyes, Cruel Fortune: The Lives and Loves of Italian Renaissance Women Poets. 2002
- Feldman, Martha; Gordon, Bonnie ed. The Courtesan's Arts: Cross-Cultural Perspectives. Oxford, 2006
- King, Margaret L., Simpson, Catherine L., Women of the Renaissance, University of Chicago Press 1991.
- Lawner, Lynne. Lives of the Courtesans: Portraits of the Renaissance. 1987
- Larivaille, Paul. La vie quotidienne des courtisanes en Italie au temps de la Renaissance: Rome et Venise, XVe et XVIe siècles, 1975 / La vita quotidiana delle cortigiane nell'Italia del Rinascimento, 2017
- Levati, Ambrogio. Donne illustri, 1822.
- Masson, Georgina. Courtesans of the Italian Renaissance. 1976
- Panizza, Letizia. Women in Italian Renaissance Culture and Society. Oxford, 2000. ISBN 1-900755-09-2.
- Pucci, Paolo. “Camilla Pisana, La Perfetta Moglie?: Tentativi Di Affermazione Personale Di Una Cortigiana Del Rinascimento.” Italica, vol. 88, no. 4, 2011, pp. 565–86. JSTOR,
- Robin, Diana Maury, Larsen, Anne R. and Levin, Carole. Encyclopedia of women in the Renaissance: Italy, France, and England — ABC-CLIO, Inc, 2007. — pp. 160–161.
- Robin, Diana Maury, Courtesans Celebrity and Print Culture in Renaissance Venice
- Rogers, Mary; Tinagli, Paola. Women in Italy, 1350–1650.
- Rosenthal, Margaret F. The Honest Courtesan: Veronica Franco, Citizen and Writer in Sixteenth-Century Venice. 2012
- Servadio, Gaia. Renaissance woman. Bloomsbury Academia, 2005
- Sison, Arielle. Veronica Franco and the 'Cortigiane Oneste': Attaining Power through Prostitution in Sixteenth-Century Venice. Stanford.
- Stortoni, Laura A. Women Poets of the Italian Renaissance: Courtly Ladies and Courtesans. — New York: Italica Press, 1997. — pp. 23–5. — ISBN 0934977437.
- Bassani, Riccardo, La donna del Caravaggio. Vita e peripezie di Maddalena Antognetti, Roma, Donzelli 2021.
- Bellini, Fiora, La modella e il “pittor celebre”: una storia in sette quadri, in Bassani, R, La donna del Caravaggio. Vita e peripezie di Maddalena Antognetti, Roma Donzelli 2021, pp. 199–235
- Bassani, Riccardo, Maddalena Antognetti e Caravaggio: una storia da accettare, in “Storia dell’arte in tempo reale”, 11 aprile 2023 (https://www.storiadellarterivista.it/blog/2023/04/11/maddalena-antognetti-e-caravaggio-una-storia-da-accettare/)
- Bellini, Fiora, Lo sfregio sulla “faccia dritta” a Maddalena Antognetti, la cortigiana modella del Caravaggio per la Madonna dei palafrenieri, in “About Art online”, 23 novembre 2023 (https://www.aboutartonline.com/lo-sfregio-sulla-faccia-dritta-a-maddalena-antognetti-la-cortigiana-modella-del-caravaggio-per-la-madonna-dei-palafrenieri/)

== Links ==
- Roman houses of courtesans
