= Imperia (disambiguation) =

Imperia is an Italian city.

Imperia may also refer to:

- Imperium (plural imperia), form of authority held by a citizen to control a military or governmental entity in ancient Rome
- Province of Imperia, the Italian province of the above city of Imperia
- IMPERIA, a vodka produced by Russian Standard
- Imperia (statue), a statue in Constance, Germany
- Impéria Automobiles, a Belgian automobile maker
- Imperia submachine gun
- Imperia La Divina, a famous Roman courtesan
