= Peter Lauterbach =

German television presenter

Peter Lauterbach (born 30 August 1976, Darmstadt) is a German television presenter and Chief Executive Officer (CEO) at Sporttotal, Cologne.

== Career ==
Lauterbach’s journalistic career commenced at Darmstädter Echo, a German newspaper, where he used to work as an editor for local news, later on he worked for the political editorial department of Reuters in Frankfurt, the radio station Hit Radio FFH, the TV channel Deutsches Sportfernsehen (DSF, now known as Sport1). Subsequently Lauterbach worked for Leo Kirch’s "Sport Dienstleistungszentrum" (SDZ), which produced sports coverage for TV stations like ProSieben, Sat.1, Premiere, DSF and N24.

In 2003 Lauterbach established his own company, ByLauterbach GmbH. Since 2000 he was also involved in German Formula 1 television broadcasting: 2000-2006 as a reporter and from 2007-2011 as host for the pay-TV channel Sky.

Lauterbach is a jury member of the Deutsche Post Speed Academy, which fosters young German motorsport talents. Other jury members are well-known motorsport personalities such as Norbert Haug, moderator Kai Ebel and racing driver Timo Glock.

Since 2013 Lauterbach has been Chief Executive Officer of Sporttotal AG (formerly WIGE Media AG), Cologne.
