= Leo Kirch =

German media entrepreneur

Leo Kirch (21 October 1926, Volkach, Germany – 14 July 2011, Munich, Germany) was a German media entrepreneur who founded the Kirch Group.

== Life ==
Kirch was born in Volkach, Bavaria, but shortly afterward his family moved to the nearby town of Würzburg. After completing high school, he studied marketing and management as well as mathematics at the Ludwig-Maximilians-Universität München, graduating in 1952. It was during this time that he gained an interest in electronic media.

Borrowing money from his wife's family, he purchased exclusive German rights for the Italian movie La strada in 1960. As his company rose to become one of the most important private media companies in what was then West Germany, the country's second public broadcaster, ZDF, came to depend on it heavily for films and other programs, partly as a result of companies that appeared to be competitors, but were actually both owned by Kirch.

This situation remained for many decades, until the launch of commercial television in 1984. Kirch was the owner of the first private channel, Sat.1 and withdrew his series from ZDF.

In 1985, he purchased a stake in the leading tabloid Bild after the death of former owner Axel Springer. During the 1990s he set up the subscription television service Premiere and became a key player in sports broadcasting rights, paying massive amounts for the rights to the German Bundesliga, eventually to the point where even players of moderate ability could earn multi-million mark salaries. This was consistent with trends happening across much of Europe at the same time. In addition, in 1996 he purchased the rights to the 2002 and 2006 FIFA World Cups for some €1.9 billion and the rights to Formula One for €1.5 billion.

Even during this decade there were reports that the group was on the brink of insolvency. His large investments in sports broadcasting rights and in pay television were major reasons. In other countries of Europe pay television could be operated profitably, because there were few freely receivable channels. Many programs aired on Premiere, however, at the same time that they aired on terrestrial television. This resulted in an investment of some €3 billion for only 2.4 million subscribers. In addition, the fact that many of Premiere's packages were more expensive than similar packages available, combined with the ease with which the decoder could be cracked, led to large amounts of piracy.

In 2002, these difficulties came to a head and KirchMedia declared itself insolvent on April 8. Kirch himself withdrew from the enterprise, but kept up participation in the Swiss arms of his business, transferring sports broadcasting rights to the subsidiary. The insolvency represents the largest insolvency of an enterprise in German postwar history. The next month Kirch sued Deutsche Bank for €100m, claiming that they had questioned the status of the group and disclosed confidential business information in the process.

It was not until 2021 that it became known that Leo Kirch had put together an art collection of around eighty paintings since the 1950s, including Claude Monet, Emil Nolde, Karl Schmidt-Rottluff, Lyonel Feininger, Franz Marc, Amedeo Modigliani, Gustav Klimt and Egon Schiele. This art collection is stored in a depot in Munich.

== Kirch and Kohl ==
Leo Kirch and former Chancellor of Germany Helmut Kohl were on friendly terms for decades. Kirch was often accused of providing Kohl and the CDU with preferential coverage and advertising. Kohl, for his part, arranged the creation of commercial television as one of his first official acts as Chancellor in 1982; this allowed Kirch to own a TV station and sports broadcasting rights.

During the 1999 CDU contributions scandal, it surfaced that Kirch had donated six million DM to the CDU during Helmut Kohl's tenure as chancellor. In addition, Kohl, along with various other CDU/CSU politicians, was revealed to be an adviser to the firm during the insolvency process.

== Kirch and Deutsche Bank ==
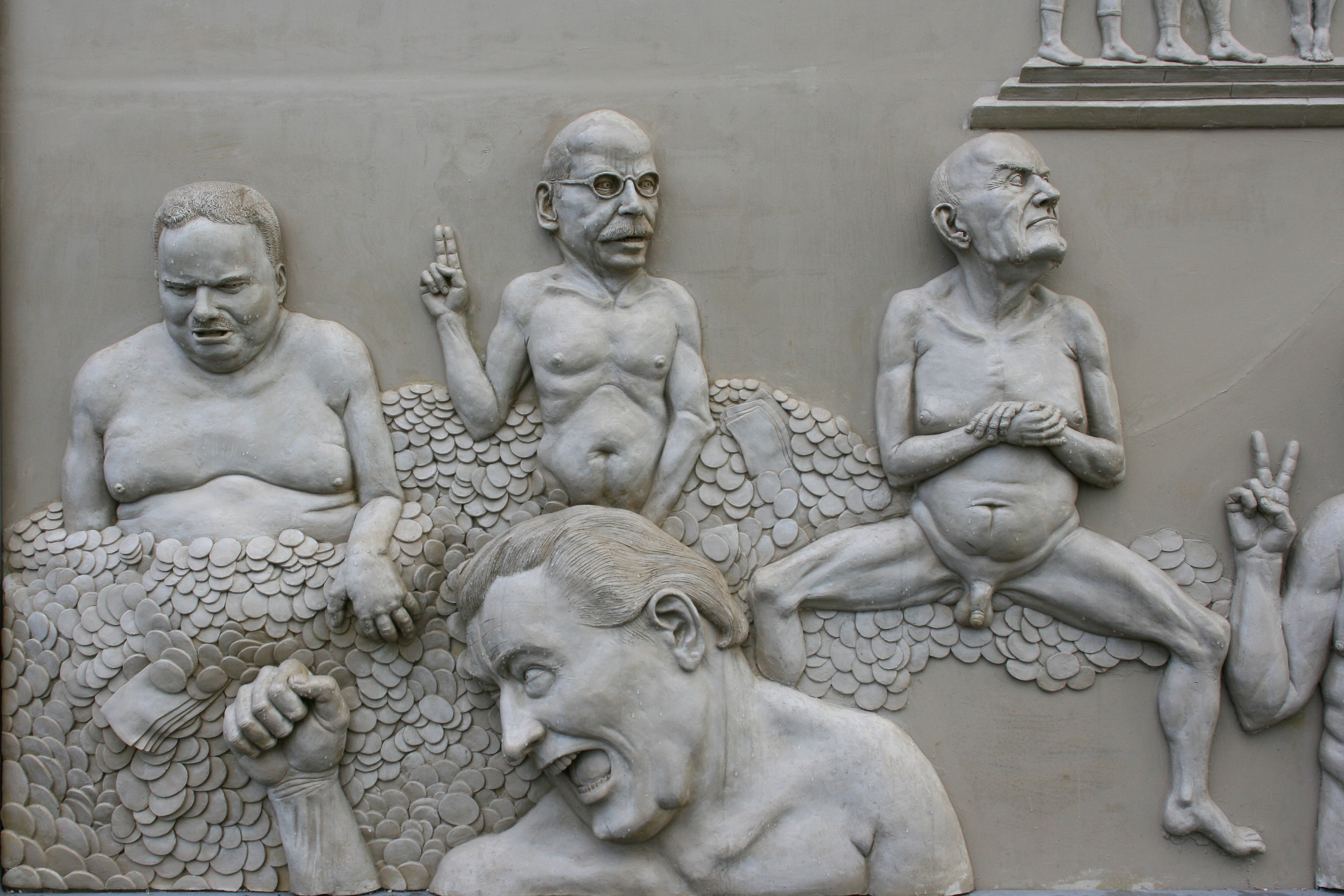
Relief Ludwigs Erbe by Peter Lenk, close to Zollhaus and tourist information, Hafenstraße 5, Ludwigshafen am Bodensee, Bodman-Ludwigshafen in Germany: Right-hand part of the triptych, top: Utz Claassen, Dieter Zetsche, Ferdinand Piëch, bottom: Leo Kirch

Kirch was identified by the Wall Street Journal in 2009 as a target of Deutsche Bank's spying scandal. Moreover, according to the WSJ, the law firm that was representing Kirch was the target, and perhaps victim of, an effort to infiltrate a "mole" into the firm in furtherance of the Bank's spying.

Kirch sued Deutsche Bank after Rolf E. Breuer, chief executive at the time, appeared on Bloomberg Television in 2002 and commented on the Kirch Group's creditworthiness, saying that the financial sector was unwilling to lend to the company (the Kirch Group was a client of the Bank at the time). Kirch asserted that the Bank had breached German confidentiality laws and tried to damage his company's reputation, blaming the Bank for the Kirch Group's collapse. After decades of litigation, Deutsche Bank announced in 2014 that it would pay Kirch's heirs more than €775 million ($1.06 billion) in a legal settlement, although it denies the allegations made by Kirch.

== Death ==
Kirch suffered from diabetes and a heart condition, becoming partially blind as a result. He died in Munich, aged 84.

== Family ==
Kirch married Ruth Kirch (née Wiegand) in 1954, they had one son, and a son from a previous relationship.
