= Galletta =

Galletta is a surname. Notable people with the surname include:

- Chris Galletta (born 1981), American screenwriter
- Lucrezia Galletta (1520s–1580), Italian courtesan
- Joseph Galletta, American politician
