= Camilla Pisana =

Italian courtesan, letter writer and poet

Camilla Pisana (probably from Pisa - fl. 1515) was an Italian courtesan (cortigiana onesta), known as a letter writer and poet.

== Biography ==
Camilla Pisana became one of four courtesans installed by Filippo Strozzi in a villa near Porta San Gallo in Florence, where they served Strozzi and his friends, including Duke Lorenzo d'Urbino (father of Catherine de' Medici). She lived there with her friends and fellow courtesans Alessandra Fiorentina, Brigida, and Beatrice Ferrarese. Among them Camilla seems, from her letters, to have assumed the role of matriarch of this unusual family. Camilla and her companions could nevertheless enjoy a house decorated by the painter Rosso Fiorentino.

Camilla was renowned for her beauty, musical and literary skills. She wrote letters to her friend Francesco del Nero (1487-1563), who was Filippo Strozzi's brother-in-law and close business associate, complaining about her mistreatment at her lover's hands.

“When this pleasant, though somewhat unconventional, household was dissolved after Strozzi lost interest in it, the girls went on to Rome, where from the rank of cortigiane oneste they soon sank to that of cortigiane piacevoli and even lower.”

== Works ==
She is known in literary history for the 33 letters she sent to Strozzi between 1516 and 1517. Her letters, together with those of Veronica Franco, are among the few and most important non-poetic writings that have come down to us from a courtesan of the Italian Renaissance. “Camilla Pisana's letters seek to persuade their readers of the writer's self-worth by employing the culturally designated language of courtly compliment, suitably phrased.”

According to Alfred Einstein, Camilla provided the words to poems set to music by the famous madrigalists Costanzo Festa and Philippe Verdelot.

Camilla, Filippo's mistress, was able to write poetry in the style of Bembo and Cassola for which we may assume that Verdelot and Festa supplied the music.

— Alfred Einstein”

It is also possible that this is the same Camilla Pisana mentioned by Aretino in La cortigiana (1534) and in the Ragionamento dello Zoppino.
