= Lucrezia Galletta =

Italian courtesan

Lucrezia Galletta (1520s – 1580), (also Lucretia Galletta), known as "la Luparella", was a wealthy courtesan (cortigiana onesta) and banker in 16th century Rome.

Lucrezia Galletta was born in the city of Bologne, somewhere between the years of 1520-1525. By the 1540s, she had become a celebrated courtesan in Rome. She was able to retire with a fortune in 1559, and thereafter had herself erased from the list of courtesans and engaged in business as a banker. This undertaking may have been aided by the fact that her lover, Francesco Spinelli, was a banker, though later on he fled, stealing money from his employers, and left her in a tight spot.

As a banker, she was quite successful, boasting international clients. Lucrezia Galletta was the only female banker who, alongside several Cardinals and members of the noblefamilies of Rome, co-signed the "grand parti de Lyon" on 18 January 1560, in which the king of France was granted a large credit.

At some point in time, Lucrezia appears to have become fairly well-educated, as the eventual inventory of her estate noted she had a collection of books. In 1566, Lucrezia faced a new challenge, in the form of a new Pope, Pius V. He decreed that all wealthy or well-known courtesans must leave Rome, except for those who either married or joined a convent. Quickly, Lucrezia married one of her banking employees, Niccoló Turini. This marriage was only on paper, and they had no relationship, but it protected her from expulsion while Turini enjoyed a hefty dowry payment.

During her later life, Lucrezia adopted a daughter, a girl named Lucrezia da Tivoli. The young girl eventually became a nun, and lived in the convent of S. Marta - which happened to be right across the street from Lucrezia Galletta's home. Upon Lucrezia Galletta's death in 1580, her fortune went to her adopted daughter, and the monastery. Her will included donations and provisions to assist poor young women in need of dowries.
