= Imperia (statue) =

Statue by Peter Lenk in Konstanz harbour, Baden-Württemberg, Germany

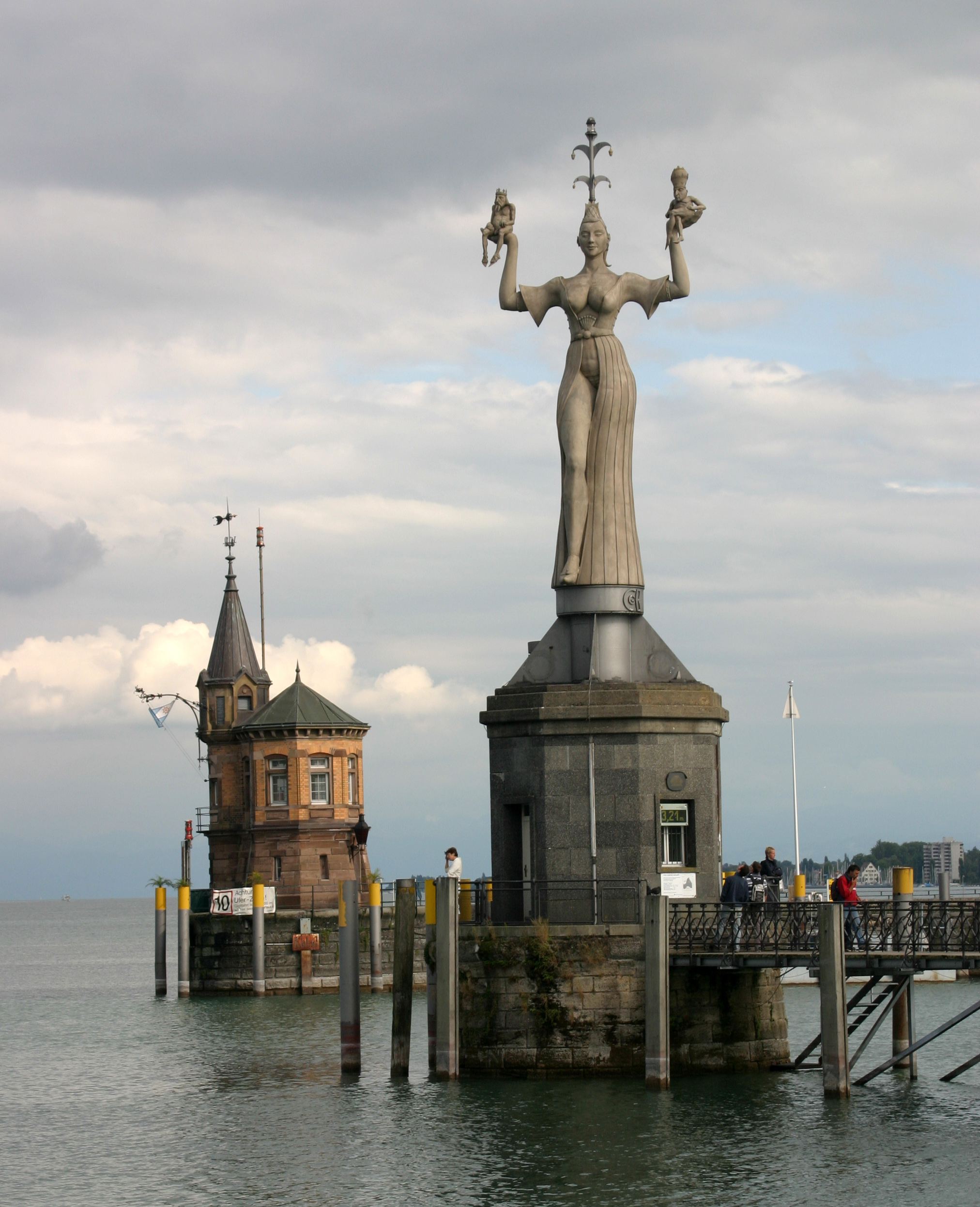
- The statue in 2006
- Artist: Peter Lenk
- Year: 1993
- Dimensions: 9 m (30 ft)
- Location: Konstanz
- 47°39′39″N 9°10′52″E

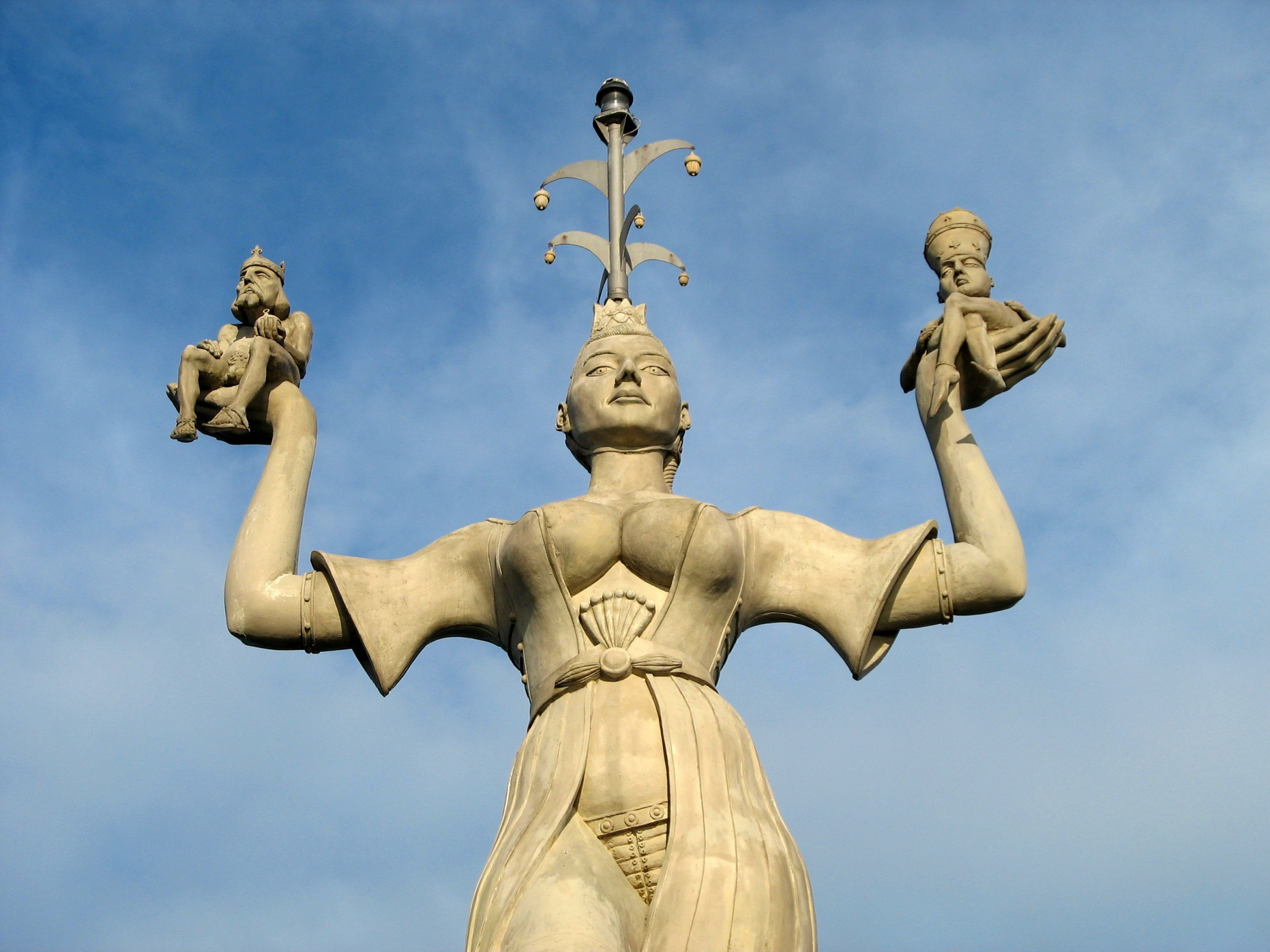
Detail of Imperia

Imperia is a statue at the entrance of the harbour of Konstanz, Germany, commemorating the Council of Constance that took place there between 1414 and 1418. The concrete statue is 9 metres (30 ft) high, weighs 18 tonnes (18 long tons; 20 short tons), and stands on a pedestal that rotates around its axis once every four minutes. It was created by Peter Lenk and clandestinely erected in 1993. The erection of the statue caused controversy, but it was on the private property of a rail company that did not object to its presence. Eventually, it became a widely-known landmark of Konstanz.

Imperia shows a woman holding two men on her hands. Although the two men resemble Pope Martin V (elected during the council) and Emperor Sigismund (who called the council), and they wear the papal tiara and imperial crown, Lenk has stated that these figures "are not the Pope and not the Emperor, but fools who have acquired the insignia of secular and spiritual power. And to what extent the real popes and emperors were also fools, I leave to the historical education of the viewer."

The statue refers to a short story by Balzac, "La Belle Impéria". The story is a harsh satire of the Catholic clergy's morals, where Imperia seduces cardinals and princes at the Council of Constance and has power over them all. The historical Imperia that served as the source material of Balzac's story was a well-educated Italian courtesan who died in 1512, nearly 100 years after the council, and never visited Konstanz.
