= Dora Levy Mossanen =

American author of historical fiction (born 1945)

- Born: December 28, 1945 (age 79); Tel Aviv, Israel

Dora Levy Mossanen (Persian: دورا لوی مصنن, born December 28, 1945) is an American author of historical fiction. Her published works include Harem (2002), Los Angeles Times and Denver Post best-seller Courtesan (2005), Denver Post best-seller The Last Romanov (2012), and Denver Post best-seller Scent of Butterflies (2014). Her forthcoming novel Love and War in the Jewish Quarter is scheduled to be released November 8, 2022, by Post Hill Press. She is a graduate of the University of Southern California Masters of Professional Writing Program and is the recipient of the San Diego State University Editor's Choice Award.

== Early life and academic career ==
Dora Levy Mossanen was born in Israel. She moved to Iran with her family when she was nine. She joined a family whose roots went back 2,500 years in Persia. Her first inspiration and invaluable source of history was her grandfather, Dr. Habib Levy, a renowned Middle Eastern historian. Dr. Levy introduced Dora to life in Mahaleh, the Jewish ghetto, antisemitism, and the challenges of being Jewish in a Muslim country.

The Islamic Revolution of 1979, the fall of the Shah, and arrival of the Ayatollah Khomeini forced Mossanen and her family to leave Iran. They settled in California and became part of what is now the largest Iranian community in the United States. In 1986, Dora obtained a bachelor's degree in English literature from the University of California Los Angeles, and in 1990 completed her master's degree in creative writing from University of Southern California.

== Writing ==
Tales she had treasured and hoarded from multiple geographies, cultures, and sensibilities, the outlandish characters she had come across, and the contradictions inherent in the Persian culture came to life in her bestselling novels Harem and Courtesan. Garnering critical and international acclaim, her works have been translated into numerous languages worldwide. She is the recipient of the prestigious San Diego Editors' Choice Award.

Early on, I became fascinated with certain strong-willed women who despite all odds managed to rise to powers of position in backward countries in the Middle East. Rebekah and Gold Dust in Harem and Mme Gabriélle and Françoise in Courtesan use sex as a weapon to realize their dreams and, of course, in the process garner power and enter a social status out of their reach.

Lured by the tumultuous political events of Imperial Russia, Mossanen decided to set her third novel, The Last Romanov, during the reign of Nicholas II. She extensively researched the Tsarist era, the political upheavals and long-drawn revolutions that led to the rise of the Bolsheviks, fall of the Romanovs, and the execution of Tsar Nicholas II, Tsarina Alexandra, and their five children. Mossanen studied the art, fashion, and ambiance of that period, the characters and eccentricities of the Imperial family, and how their only son's hemophilia devastated their personal life and wreaked havoc on the politics of the country. As in her previous novels, Mossanen weaved characters of her own creation among historical figures, protagonists such as the opal-eyed Darya Borisovna and the Jewish Avram Bensheimer, whose great love test the rigid boundaries of an anti-Semite court steeped in myth and superstition.

An examination into a woman experiencing the ravages of betrayal, oppression while allowing her frustration and hurt lead her on an emotionally driven course, Scent of Butterflies (2014), delves into cultural differences and attitudes towards women and infidelity. Interesting, educational, not to mention an intriguing read with a potentially lethal emotionally unstable protagonist – “Hell hath no fury like a woman scorned”.

== Media ==
Dora Levy Mossanen is a frequent contributor to numerous media outlets including The Huffington Post, The Jewish Journal, New York Journal of Books, The Denver Post and Sh'ma. She has been featured on KCRW: The Politics of Culture, Radio Iran and numerous television programs. In 2010, Dora was accepted as contributor to the Bread Loaf Writers' Conference.

== Bibliography ==
- Harem. New York, NY: Touchstone, 2002. ISBN 978-0-743-23021-6
- Courtesan. New York, NY: Touchstone, 2005. ISBN 978-0-743-24678-1
- The Last Romanov. Naperville, IL: Sourcebooks Landmark, 2012. ISBN 978-1-402-26594-5
- Scent of Butterflies. Naperville, IL: Sourcebooks Landmark, 2014.
- Dora, Levy Mossanen (2014). Il silenzio delle farfalle (eNewton Narrativa). Newton Compton Editori.
- Mossanen, Dora Levy (2022). Love and War in the Jewish Quarter. Post Hill Press. p. 295. ISBN 978-1-637-58556-6.
