= Tullia d'Aragona =

Italian courtesan, author

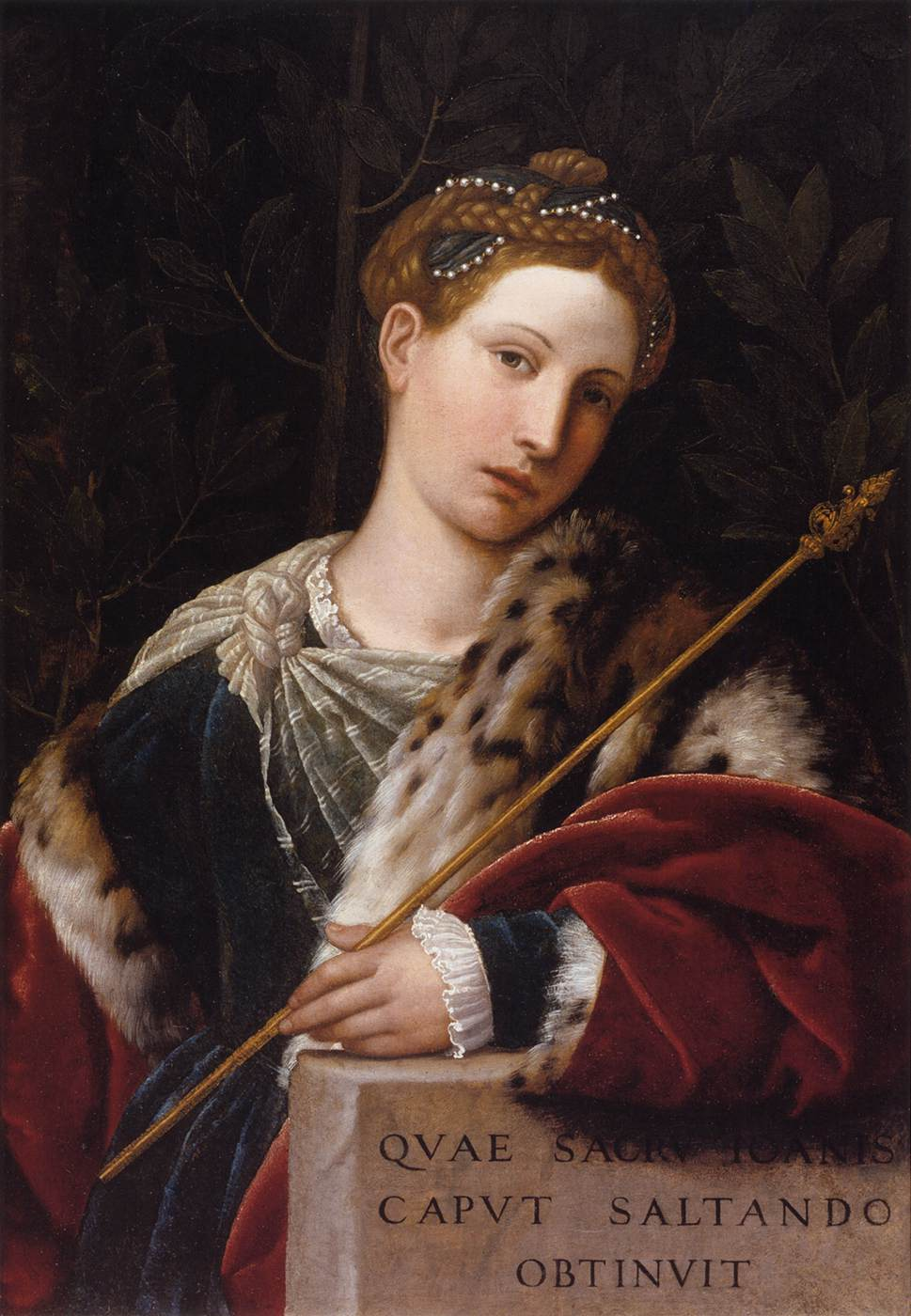
- Tullia d'Aragona, portrayed as Salome L'Erodiade by Moretto da Brescia
- Born: 1501 - 1505; Rome
- Died: March or April 1556; Rome
- Occupations: Poet, author, philosopher, courtesan
- Parents: Costanzo Palmieri d'Aragona (father); Giulia Ferrarese (mother)

Tullia d'Aragona (1501/1505 – March or April 1556) was an Italian poet, author, and philosopher. Born in Rome sometime between 1501 and 1505, Tullia traveled throughout Venice, Ferrara, Siena, and Florence before returning to Rome. During a time when scholars still debated whether women were capable of serious writing or philosophical thought, Tullia d'Aragona earned a reputation as an accomplished writer, poet, and thinker. Her work influenced many famous philosophers, including Benedetto Varchi. Her intellect, literary abilities, and social graces helped her become one of the most celebrated Renaissance poet-courtesans.

== Early years ==
Tullia was born in Rome sometime between 1501 and 1505, to Giulia Campana (formerly Giulia Pendaglia), daughter of the otherwise unknown Orsino Pendaglia from Ferrara. Also known as Giulia Ferrarese, Tullia's mother was lauded as "the most famous beauty of her day." A floor tomb in the Church of S. Agostino in Rome confirms her mother's last name as Campana. It is unknown if Tullia's maternal grandfather was a member, natural or legitimate, of a noble Ferrarese family with the same name.

There is some controversy surrounding who fathered Tullia. A document in Siena identifies her father as Costanzo Palmieri d'Aragona from Naples. Tullia and her admirers claim her father is in fact Cardinal Luigi d'Aragona, the illegitimate grandson of Ferdinando d'Aragona, King of Naples. Some have speculated that Giulia's marriage to Costanzo Palmieri d'Aragona was a cover-up orchestrated by Cardinal Luigi d'Aragona's family to hide his liaison. This allowed him to continue to frequent her without interference. Some researchers have inferred that this was a way for the family to save face. Because Tullia's mother was not married to her father, Tullia's life was marked by the stigma of her illegitimate birth to a courtesan mother.

Nevertheless, the Cardinal provided Tullia with a classical education in the humanities. Young Tullia proved to be a child prodigy who amazed even her mother's 'guests.' Tullia spent the first part of her childhood in Rome, but around the time of the Cardinal's departure for his well-known journey through northern Europe, she and her mother moved to Siena.

While in Siena, Tullia's mother married Africano Orlandini from the noble Orlandini family. There are accounts of Tullia returning to Rome in 1524, which is when she was immortalized in a madrigal by Philippe Verdelot. By June 1526, Tullia was confirmed to have returned to Rome in the company of the Florentine banker Filippo Strozzi, as written in a letter from Strozzi to Francesco Vettori. Tullia and Strozzi spent many years together traveling throughout Italy until his suicide in 1538.

== Years in Rome ==
Entering into the world as courtesan (Cortigiana onesta) at age 18, d'Aragona became successful as a writer and an intellectual. She was often seen in the company of poets, such as Sperone Speroni. After the Cardinal's death in 1519, d'Aragona spent seven years in Siena, before she returned to Rome in 1526. Available evidence suggests that she was highly mobile and stayed in Bologna in 1529, where Pope Clement VII and Holy Roman Emperor Charles V were engaged in negotiations after the Sack of Rome in 1527.

In 1531, she met Filippo Strozzi, a Florentine banking magnate who had been famous for a short-lived affair with Italy's most beautiful courtesan, Camilla Pisana. Strozzi became so enamored with d'Aragona that he shared state secrets with her and had to be recalled to Florence. Other lovers included Emilio Orsini, who founded a Tullia Society of six cavaliers who protected her honor.

In 1535, Penelope d’Aragona was born in Rome. Scholars debate whether Penelope d'Aragona was d'Aragona's daughter (d'Aragona at the time was 25 years old), or her sister, as the family claimed.

== Later years ==
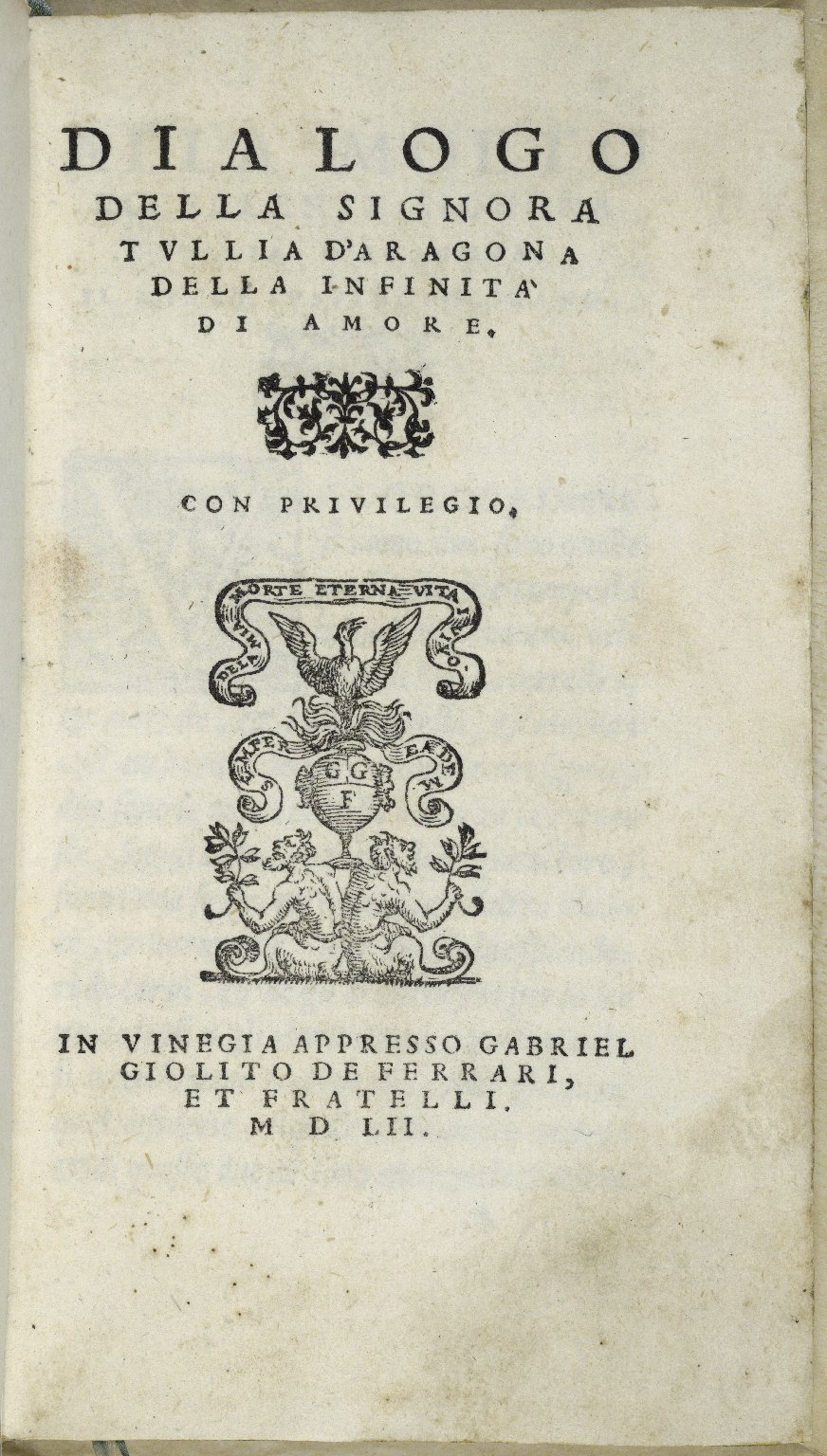
The title page of a 1552 edition of her Dialogues on the Infinity of Love.

As early as 1530 d'Aragona was in Venice, although it is unsure when she was in fact there. According to Filippo Strozzi's letter, she was there in the Spring of 1532. d'Aragona appeared, together with Bernardo Tasso, in Sperone Speroni's Dialogo d'amore, which took place in Venice.

Supposedly, Speroni began composing the dialogue in 1528, but he did not include d'Aragona as an interlocutor until later, certainly by June 1536, when Aretino mentions the work was circulating in manuscript in a letter to Speroni.

By 1535, d'Aragona was hosting gatherings of literati in her home in Venice, which inspired the setting for Sperone Speroni's dialogue on love, to which she later responded with her own dialogue. Tullia returned to Rome for the birth of Penelope d'Aragona on March 10, 1535.

Scholars disagree on whether Penelope was Tullia's daughter or sister. While at a minimum a twenty-five year age difference between siblings is not implausible of a gap it is uncommon. Claims by Tullia's family support the argument that Penelope was Tullia's sister. Nonetheless, she was back in Rome, which was recorded in a letter Tullia wrote to Francesco de' Pazzi, a friend and companion of Piero Strozzi, Filippo's eldest son.

In 1537, Battista Stambellino's correspondence to Isabella D'Este suggests Tullia was living in Ferrara. She apparently came to Ferrara to see Filippo Strozzi, and while there, heard the preaching's of the reformist Bernardo Ochino, who she later referenced a sonnet on the importance of free will. coincidentally Vittoria Colonna was also in Ferrara around the same time, though unlikely they ever met or crossed paths. Ferrara was a capital for arts and culture, and d'Aragona made full use of her skills for singing and sharp-tongued entertainment. Two of Italy's literary giants, Girolamo Muzio and Ercole Bentivoglio, both fell in love with her. Muzio wrote five ardent eclogues to her, naming her as "Thalia", while Bentivoglio went so far as to carve her name on every tree on the Po River. When she left Ferrara four years later, reportedly more than one man had attempted suicide for her. She later moved to Siena sometime between 1543 and 1545.

In 1543, she is recorded to have married Silvestro Guiccardi of Ferrara, whom we do not know anything about. The only evidence of their relationship is a malicious comment that was made by Agnolo Firenzuola who claimed that Tullia let her husband die of hunger. For Tullia, this marriage acted as a way for her to "exempt herself from living in the neighborhood designated for prostitutes," and allowed her to wear clothing that distinguished her as a noble woman. Tullia did, however, have a confirmend son Celio, who is mentioned in her will, but it is unconfirmed whether or not Guiccardi was the father.

In late 1545 or early 1546 due to political uprisings, d'Aragona fled Siena to seek refuge in Florence in the court of Cosimo I. By the end of 1546 she was living in a villa just outside of Florence near the Mensola River. She received numerous visitors to her home. Many of which were poets themselves often exchanging verse with her as recorded in her Choral anthology.

In 1547 Tullia was once again charged with disobeying sumptuary legislation. She goes to successfully appeal this charge personally to both Eleonora di Toledo, Duchess of Florence, and to Cosimo I. They acquit her due to her "rare knowledge of poetry and philosophy." Following this episode She publishes both her Choral Anthology, and dialogue with Gabriele Giolito in Venice.

While there, she composed Dialogues on the Infinity of Love (1547), which is a Neo-Platonist assertion of women's sexual and emotional autonomy within exchanges of romantic love. Initially published in Venice, Italy in 1547 (in Italian), the novel has been translated in recent years in English for the first time by Rinaldina Russell and Bruce Merry in 1997. This book of philosophy was the first of its kind, for it cast a female rather than a male as the main commentator/ knowledge holder on the ethics of love. During Tullia's life, all forms of sensual experiences were considered sacrilegious, but Tullia argues in her work that all sexual drives are uncontrollable and blameless, and that they combined with spiritual needs create the only moral form of love. The only way for love to be honorable, according to this piece, is if both males and females accept and acknowledge their sexual and spiritual desires (of their body and soul). This concept not only validated the importance of sexual desires within a society that choose to repress such things, but also vindicated the role and power of women in a society that viewed women as less than. Tullia brings women to an equal level with men in regards to both their sexual nature and their intellect.

In October 1548 she informed Benedetto Varchi that she is leaving Florence and returning to Rome in a letter. She Appears in Rome in 1549, living near Monsignor Annibale Caro near Palazzo Carpi.

During the preceding century, the Medici court had sponsored considerable revival of Neo-Platonist scholarship, particularly Marsilio Ficino, who had also written on the nature of sexual desire and love from this perspective. At the same time, she wrote a series of sonnets that praised the attributes of prominent Florentine noblemen of her era, or celebrated contemporary literary figures. Her last known work, Il Meschino, is an epic poem, which related the experiences of a captive youth, Giarrino, who was enslaved and journeyed across Europe, Africa and Asia, as well as Purgatory and Hell, trying to find his lost parents.

As an aging forty-year-old, d'Aragona continued writing sonnets, especially to historian and poet Benedetto Varchi, who inspired her. With his patronage and her intellect, she turned her house into a philosophical academy for the cognoscenti, and she continued to thrive as a writer.

After this, d'Aragona returned to Rome from Florence, and little further is known about her life. She died in March or April 1556 in Rome. After her death, there were posthumous editions of her work in Italian, in 1552, 1694, 1864, 1912, 1974, 1975 and 1980. Her work has been discussed in the University of Chicago's "The Other Voice in Early Modern Europe" series, which deals with texts from Renaissance era female authors, as well as male advocates of women's emancipation from that era.

== Works ==
- Rime della signora Tullia d'Aragona e di diversi a lei (1547); translated as Dialogues on the Infinity of Love (Chicago: University of Chicago, 1997, ISBN 0-226-13639-6)
- Della infinita’ d’amore : dialogo (1547)/ di Tullia d’Aragona colla vita dell’ autrice scritta da Alessandro Zilioli. G. Daelli, 1864.

== Sources ==
- Julia Hairston: D'Aragona, Tullia: c1510-1556: An article in the database of Italian women writers hosted by the University of Chicago Library.
- Georgina Masson: "Tullia d'Aragona, Intellectual Courtesan" in G.Masson (ed)Courtesans of the Italian Renaissance: London: Secker and Warburg: 1975: 91–131: ISBN 0-436-27352-7
- Elizabeth A. Pallitto, "Laura's Laurels: Re-visioning Platonism and Petrarchism in the Philosophy and Poetry of Tullia d'Aragona," PhD Dissertation in Comparative Literature, City University of New York Graduate Center, 2002.
- Elizabeth A. Pallitto (trnsl/ed): "Sweet Fire: Tullia d'Aragona's Poetry of Dialogue and Selected Prose": George Braziller: 2006: ISBN 0-8076-1562-5
- Rinaldina Russell: "Tullia d'Aragona" in R.Russell (ed) Italian Women Writers: London: Greenwood: 1994: 26–34. ISBN 0-313-28347-8
- Sunshine for Women: Tullia d'Aragona: 1510–1556: Concise biographical account and excerpts from Dialogues of the Infinity of Love
- Authors in Rooms of Their Own ‘Shakespeare’s Sisters’ at the Folger Shakespeare Library (Exhibit of Tullia's original works)
- Monika Antes, “Die Kurtisane. Tullia d'Aragona”, Königshausen & Neumann, Würzburg 2006. ISBN 978-3-8260-3333-9
- (in Italian) Monika Antes, “Tullia d'Aragona, cortigiana e filosofa” Mauro Pagliai Editore, Deizione Polistampa, Firenze 2011. ISBN 978-88-564-0170-7
- Aragona, Tullia D' Preface. Dialogue on the Infinity of Love. Trans. Rinaldina Russell and Bruce Merry. Chicago: U of Chicago, 1997. N. pag. Print.
- Pallitto, Elizabeth. "Tullia D'Aragona." Tullia D'Aragona. Project Continua, 2016. Web. 19 Oct.2016.
- Hairston, Julia A. "Tullia D'Aragona." Oxford Bibliographies. Oxford University Press, 28 Apr. 2016.Web. 19 Oct. 2016.
- Daniela dos Santos: : "The narrative-dramatic progression in Dialogue on the infinity of love by Tullia d'Aragona"/ "A progressão dramático-narrativa de Sobre a Infinidade do Amor de Tullia d'Aragona". 2017. 100 p. Dissertação (Mestrado em Teoria e História Literária) – Universidade Estadual de Campinas, Instituto de Estudos da Linguagem, Campinas, SP.
