= Courtesan =

Prostitute with an upper-class clientele

A courtesan is a prostitute with a courtly, wealthy, or upper-class clientele. Historically, the term referred to a courtier, a person who attended the court of a monarch or other powerful person.

== History ==
In European feudal society, the court was the centre of government as well as the residence of the monarch, and social and political life were often completely mixed together. During this era, courtesans were requested to convey information to visiting dignitaries, when servants could not be trusted.

In Renaissance Europe, it was customary for royal couples to lead separate lives, commonly marrying only to preserve bloodlines and to secure political alliances. Royalty men and women would often seek gratification and companionship from people living at court, so courtiers played an extremely important role in upper-class society.

The verb 'to court' originally meant "to be or reside at court", and later came to mean "to behave as a courtier" and then 'courtship', or "to pay amorous attention to somebody".

In Renaissance usage, the Italian word cortigiana, feminine of cortigiano ("courtier"), came to refer to a person who attends the court, and then to a well-educated and independent woman, eventually a trained artist or artisan of dance and singing, especially one associated with wealthy, powerful, or upper-class society who was given luxuries and status in exchange for entertainment and companionship.

In English, the word was borrowed from Italian during the 16th century through the French form courtisane, especially associated with the meaning of donna di palazzo.

A male figure comparable to the courtesan was the Italian cicisbeo, the French chevalier servant, the Spanish cortejo or estrecho.

The most intimate companion of a ruler was called the "favourite".

The courtesans of East Asia, particularly those of the Japanese empire, held a different social role than that of their European counterparts. Examples of Japanese courtesans included the oiran class, who were more focused on the aspect of entertainment than European courtesans.

Courtesans or dancers of ancient India known as ganika were the center of city life. According to historian Sanjay K. Gautam, they symbolized "both sexual-erotic and aesthetic pleasure".

== Categories ==
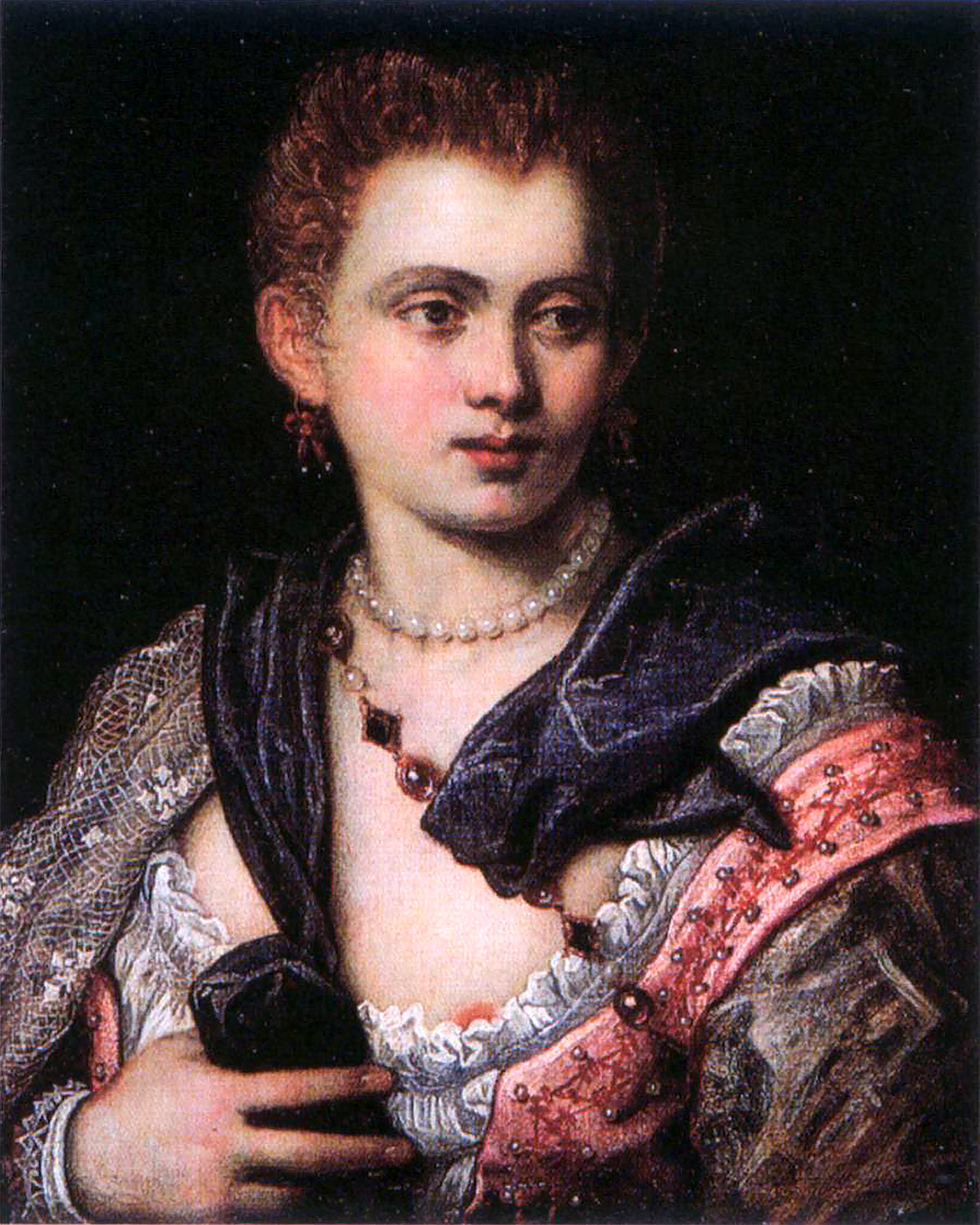
Veronica Franco, famous Venetian poet and courtesan. Portrait by Tintoretto.

One type of courtesan was known (in Italy) as the cortigiana onesta, or the honest courtesan, who was cast as an intellectual. Another was the cortigiana di lume, a lower class of courtesan. The former was the sort most often romanticized and treated more-or-less equally to women of the nobility. It is with this type of courtesan that the art of "courtisanerie" is best associated.

The cortigiane oneste were usually well-educated and worldly (sometimes more so than most upper-class women), and often held simultaneous careers as performers or artists. They were typically chosen on the basis of their "breeding"—social and conversational skills, intelligence, common sense, and companionship—as well as their physical attributes. It was usually their wit and personality that set them apart from regular women. Sex constituted only a facet of the courtesan's array of services. For example, they were well-dressed and ready to engage and participate in a variety of topics ranging from art to music to politics.

In some cases, courtesans were from well-to-do backgrounds, and were even married—but to husbands lower on the social ladder than their clients. In these cases, their relationships with those of high social status had the potential to improve their spouses' status—and so, more often than not, the husband was aware of his wife's profession and dealings.

== Differences in status ==
=== As primary employment ===
Courtesans from non-wealthy backgrounds provided charming companionship for extended periods, no matter what their own feelings or commitments might have been at the time, and sometimes had to be prepared to do so on short notice. They were also subject to lower social status, and often religious disapproval, because of the perceived immoral aspects of their profession and their reliance upon courtisanerie as a primary source of income. In cases like this, a courtesan was solely dependent on her benefactor or benefactors financially, making her vulnerable; Cora Pearl is a good example.

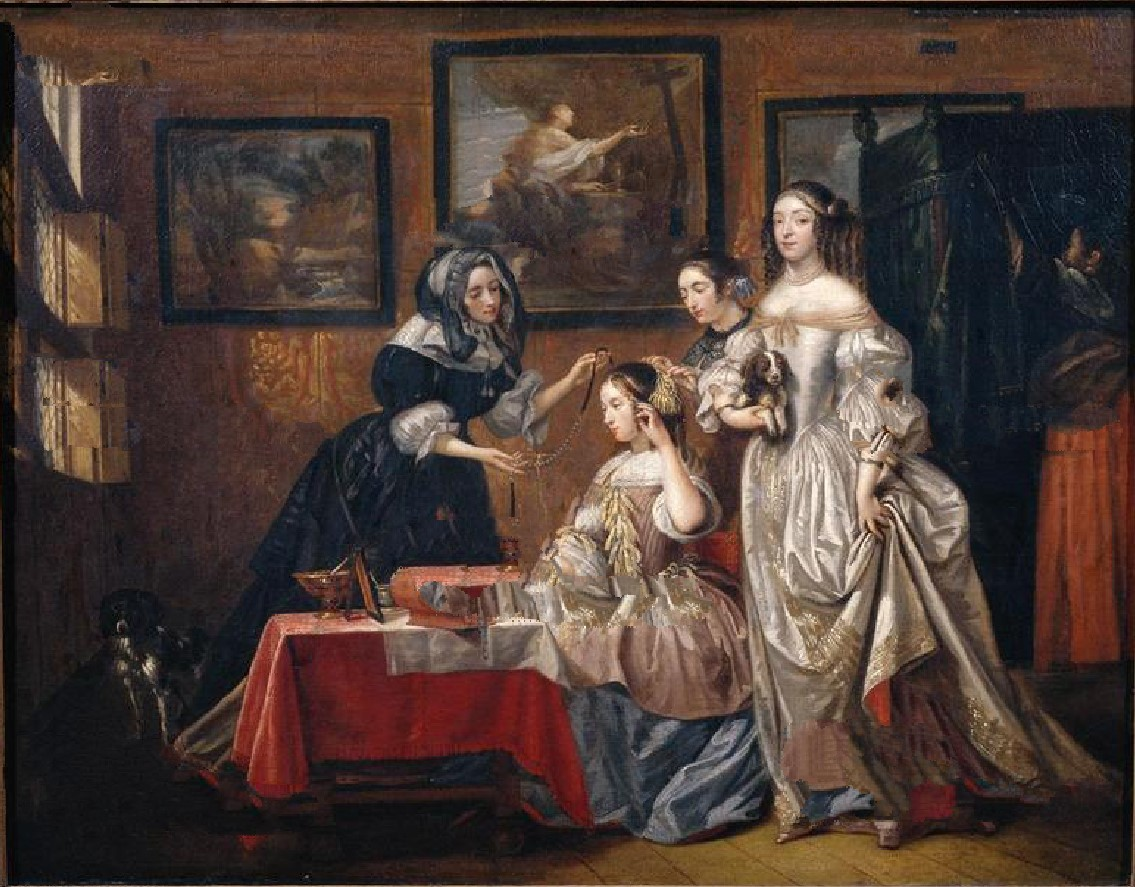
Courtesans with their servants by Lancelot Volders

Often, courtesans serving in this capacity began their career as prostitutes, although many came to the profession by other means. It was not uncommon for a courtesan to enter into an arranged long-term liaison by contract with a wealthy benefactor. These contracts were written up by and witnessed by lawyers and were binding. Most included some provision for the financial welfare of the courtesan beyond the end of the relationship in the form of an annuity. Many such women became so powerful socially and financially that they could be particular about the men they associated with; in other words, they chose their paramour as would any other mistress, not the other way around. Wealthy benefactors would go to great lengths to court a courtesan as a prize, the ultimate goal being a long-term contract as a mistress.

Occasionally courtesans were passed from one benefactor to another, thereby resulting in them being viewed in society circles as lower than both their benefactor and those of wealth and power with whom they would socialise. Often, in instances of this sort, if the courtesan had satisfactorily served a benefactor, that benefactor would, when ending the affair, pass her on to another benefactor of wealth as a favour to the courtesan, or set her up in an arranged marriage to a semi-wealthy benefactor. If the courtesan had angered or dissatisfied a benefactor, then she would often find herself cast out of wealthy circles, returning more often than not to street prostitution.

=== For social or political benefits ===
Should not be confused with a royal mistress

Those from wealthy backgrounds, either by birth or marriage, and who were acting as courtesans only for the social or political advancement of themselves and/or their spouses were generally treated as equals. They were more respected by their extramarital companions, both placing one another's family obligations ahead of the relationship and planning their own liaisons or social engagements around the lovers' marital obligations.

Affairs of this sort would often be short-lived, ending when either the courtesan or the courtesan's spouse received the status or political position desired, or when the benefactor chose the company of another courtesan, and compensated the former companion financially. In instances like this, it was often viewed simply as a business agreement by both parties involved. The benefactor was aware of the political or social favors expected by the courtesan, the courtesan was aware of the price expected from them for those favors being carried out, and the two met one another's demands.

This was generally a safe affair, as both the benefactor's spouse and the courtesan's spouse usually were fully aware of the arrangement, and the courtesan was not solely dependent on the benefactor. It, rather, was simply an affair of benefits gained for both those involved. Publicly and socially, affairs of this sort were common during the 17th, 18th and 19th centuries, as well as the early 20th century, and were generally accepted in wealthy circles.

== Career length ==
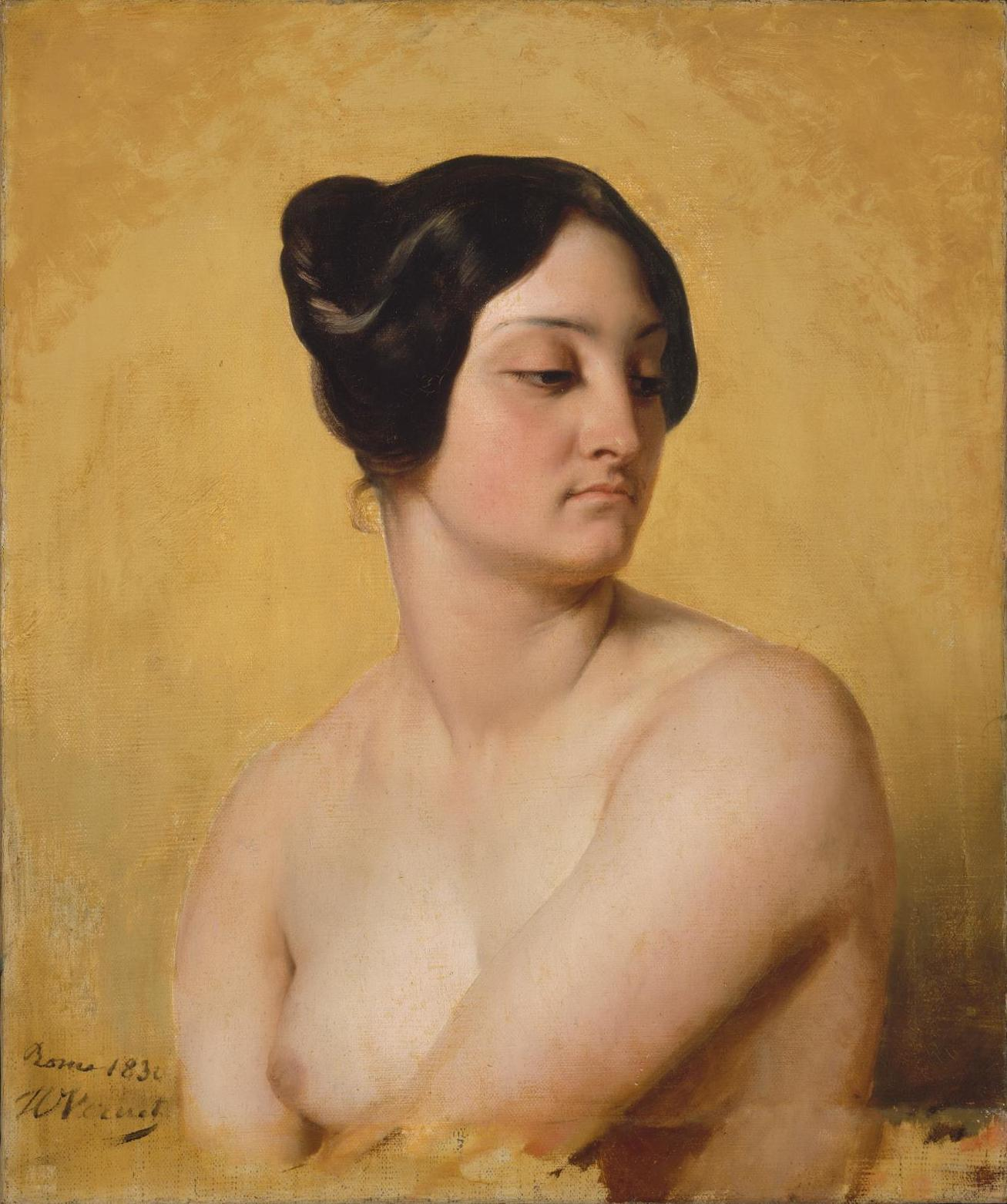
Olympe Pélissier (Vernet, 1830) was described by Balzac as "the most beautiful courtesan in Paris". In 1846, she married Rossini.

In later centuries, from the mid-18th century on, courtesans would often find themselves cast aside by their benefactors, but the days of public execution or imprisonment based on their promiscuous lifestyle were over. There are many examples of courtesans who, by remaining discreet and respectful to their benefactors, were able to extend their careers into or past middle age and retire financially secure; Catherine Walters is a good example. By the late 19th century, and for a brief period in the early 20th century, courtesans had reached a level of social acceptance in many circles and settings, often even to the extent of becoming a friend and confidant to the wife of their benefactor.

More often than not, a woman serving as a courtesan would last in that field only as long as she could prove herself useful to her companion, or companions. This, of course, excludes those who served as courtesans but who were already married into high society. When referring to those who made their service as a courtesan as their main source of income, success was based solely on financial management and longevity. Many climbed through the ranks of royalty, serving as mistress to lesser nobles first, eventually reaching the role of (unofficial) mistress to a king or prince.

Pietro Aretino, an Italian Renaissance writer, wrote a series of dialogues (Capricciosi ragionamenti) in which a mother teaches her daughter what options are available to women and how to be an effective courtesan. In eighteenth-century French literature, the courtesan tends to be idealised as a beautiful and intellectually refined figure of classical antiquity, who invariably enjoys excellent health and is untouched by the contemporary societal scourge of syphilis (often politely referred to as "smallpox") and other sexually transmitted diseases. The French novelist Balzac wrote about a courtesan in his Splendeurs et misères des courtisanes (1838–47). Émile Zola likewise wrote a novel, Nana (1880), about a courtesan in nineteenth-century France.

== Famous courtesans ==
This is a list of some professional courtesans. They are not royal mistresses, unless a professional courtesan was also a royal mistress.

Separately from this list, the term courtesan has been used in a political context in an attempt to damage the reputation of a powerful woman or disparage her importance. Because of this, there is still much historical debate over whether certain women in history were courtesans. For example, the title was applied to the Byzantine empress Theodora, who had started life as an erotic actress, but later became the wife of the Emperor Justinian and, after her death, an Orthodox saint.

=== Antiquity and the Middle Ages ===
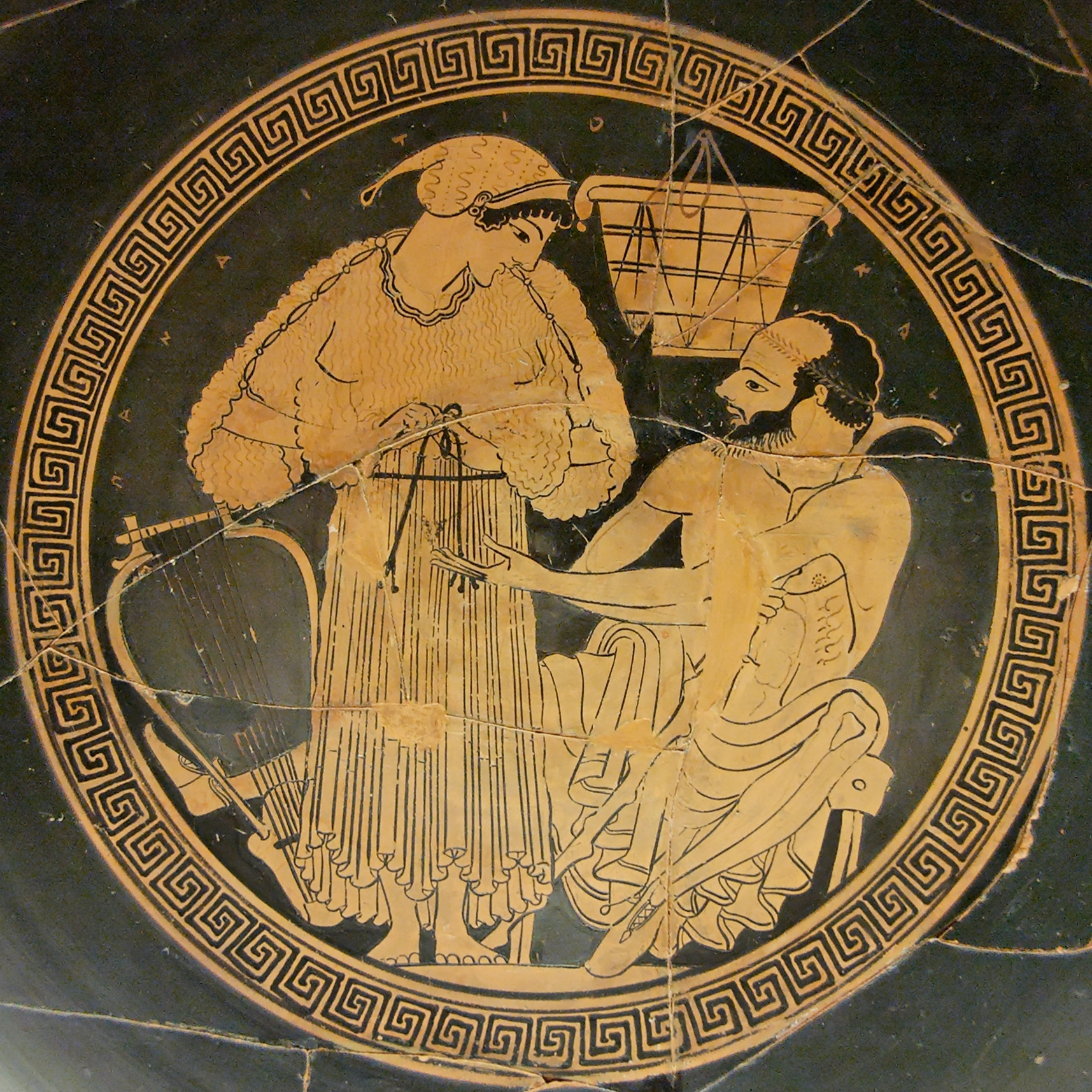
Reveller courtesan BM E44

- Amrapali (5th century BC), nagarvadhu dancer of Vaishali, following the Buddha's teachings she became an arahant.
- Arib al-Ma'muniyya (Arabic: عَرِيب المأمونية, 797–890), qiyan
- Fadl al-Sha'irah (Arabic: فضل الشاعرة, d. 871 ), qiyan
- Inan bint Abdallah (Arabic: عِنان, d. 841), qiyan
- Lais of Corinth (5th century BC), hetaira-courtesan
- Lais of Hyccara (killed 340 BC), hetaira-courtesan
- Phryne (4th century BC), hetaira-courtesan
- Praecia (fl. 73 BC), Roman courtesan
- Shāriyah (Arabic: شارِية, c. 815–870), qiyan
- Thaïs (4th century BC), hetaira-courtesan
- Theodora (6th century) (c. 500–28 June 548), Byzantine actress-courtesan, later wife of Justinian I of the Byzantine Empire
- Volumnia Cytheris (1st century BC), Roman mimae actress and courtesan

=== The Renaissance and the 17th century ===
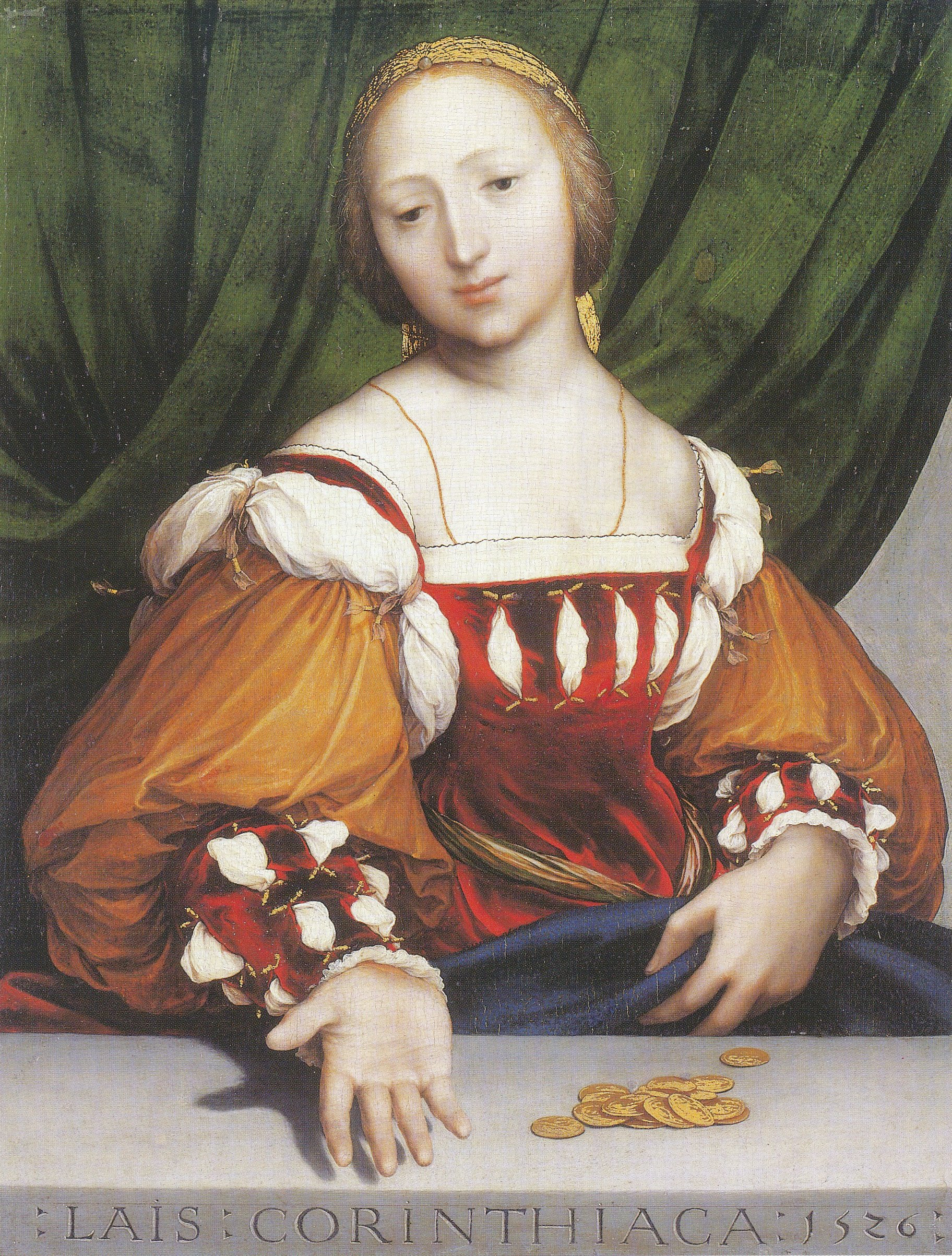
Lais of Corinth by Hans Holbein the Younger, Kunstmuseum Basel

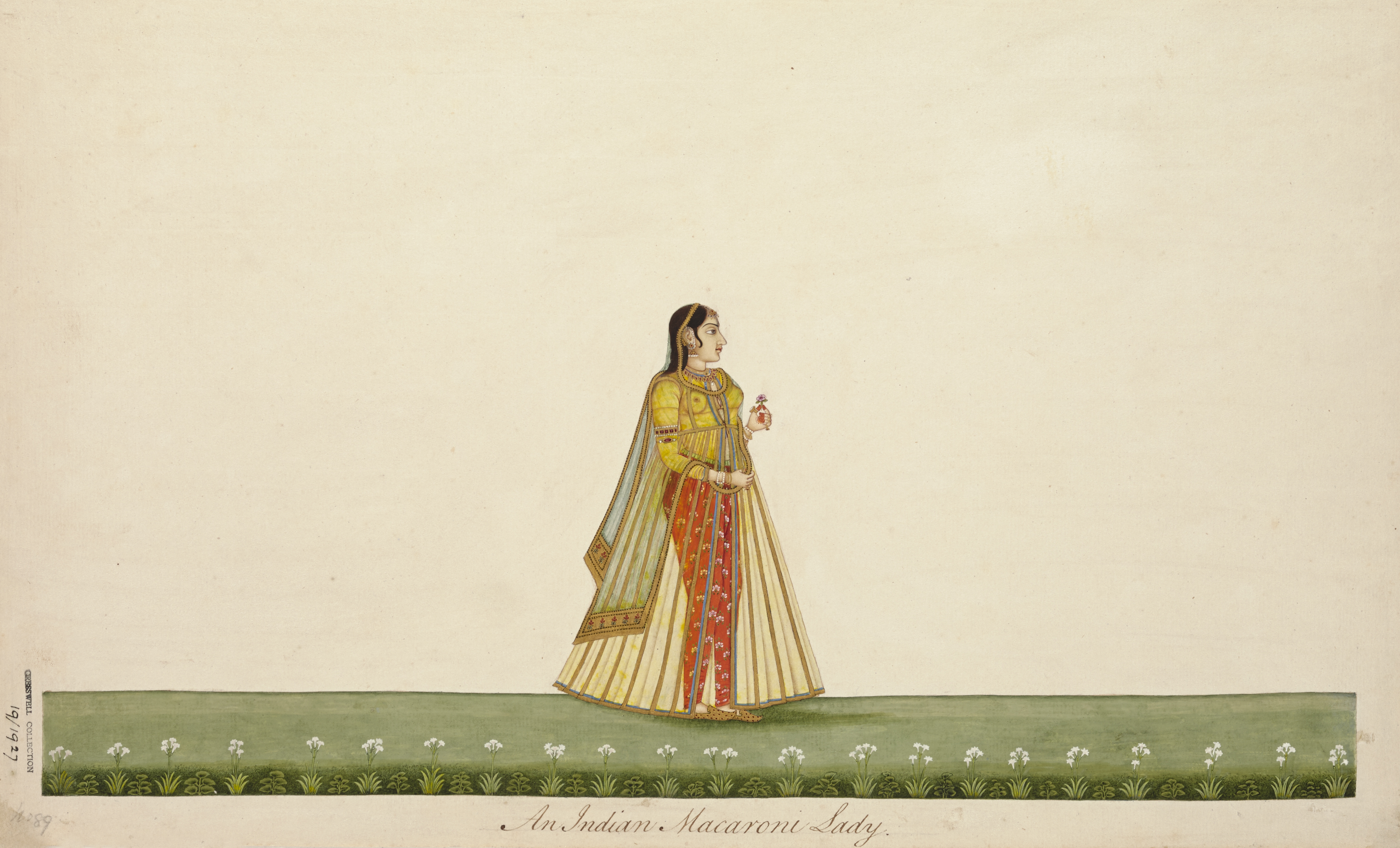
This lady is probably a courtesan or tawaif. She would be accomplished in the arts of music, dancing and poetry and would entertain the men of the court, particularly in Moghul India. Her elegance and expensive gold-embroidered veil show her high status.

- Anarkali (17th-century) tawaif of Salim (later Mughal emperor Jahangir)
- Du Shiniang, China Ming dynasty courtesan
- Hwang Jini (fl. 1550): legendary gisaeng of the Joseon dynasty
- Imperia Cognati (1486–1512), courtesan of Renaissance Rome, referred to as the "first courtesan" in Europe
- Kanhopatra (15th-century) Indian Marathi saint-poet and dancer, singer
- List of Italian Renaissance courtesans:
  - Tullia d'Aragona (c. 1510–1556): top courtesan in several Italian cities, and published poet
  - Veronica Franco (1546–1591): a Venetian cortigiana onesta courtesan who was once lover to King Henry III of France and was depicted in the movie Dangerous Beauty
- Marion Delorme (c. 1613–1650): lover of George Villiers, Duke of Buckingham, the Prince of Condé, and Cardinal Richelieu
- Ninon de l'Enclos (1615–1705): lover of the Prince of Condé and Gaspard de Coligny
- Takao II (高尾, 1640–1659), Japanese oiran-courtesan
- Yu Gam-dong (15th-century), Korean courtesan

=== 18th century ===
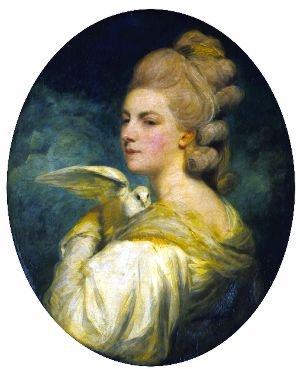
Mary Nesbitt

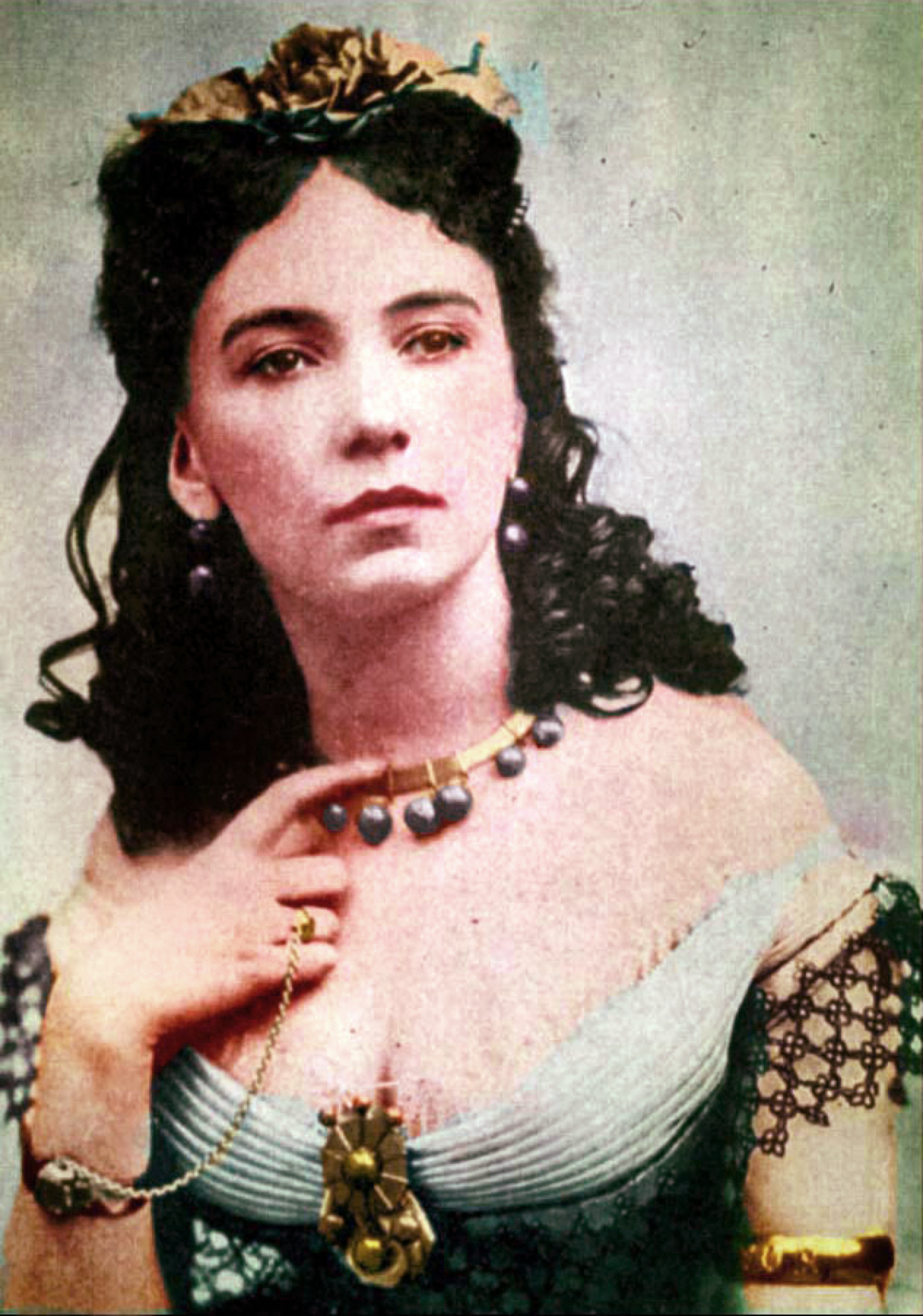
Cora Pearl

- Sophie Arnould (1740– 1802) , French operatic soprano and courtesan.
- Charlotte Slottsberg (1760–1800), Swedish courtesan-ballerina, lover, but not official royal mistress of Charles XIII of Sweden
- Claudine Guérin de Tencin (1681–1749), French courtesan and later a famous salonnière
- Dorothy Jordan (1761–1816), British courtesan-actress
- Emma Hamilton (1765–1815), English model-actress, wife of William Hamilton and mistress of Lord Nelson
- Grace Elliott (1754?–1823), British courtesan
- Josefa Ordóñez (1728 – d. after 1792), Mexican courtesan-actress
- Kitty Fisher (died 1767), British courtesan and model
- Madame du Barry (1743–1793), French courtesan, last Maîtresse-en-titre of Louis XV
- Mah Laqa Bai (7 April 1768 – August 1824), Indian tawaif and poet
- Marie-Louise O'Murphy (1737–1814), French courtesan, lover, but not official royal mistress of Louis XV
- Mary Nesbitt (1742–1825), British courtesan and spy
- Rosalie Duthé (1748–1830), French courtesan, has been called "the first officially recorded dumb blonde"
- Sophia Baddeley (1745–1786), British courtesan
- Støvlet-Cathrine (1745–1805), Danish courtesan, lover, but not official royal mistress of King Christian VII of Denmark
- Zofia Potocka (1760–1822), Greek courtesan, mistress of Grigory Potemkin and wife of Szczęsny Potocki

=== 19th century ===
- Binodini Dasi (1862–1941), Indian tawaif-actress
- Blanche d'Antigny (1840–1874), French courtesan; Émile Zola used her as the principal model for his novel Nana
- Catherine Walters (1839–1920), British courtesan
- Cora Pearl (1836–1886), demimonde-courtesan ("Grande Horizontale") of the Second Empire
- The Countess, also known as Pauline, a French transgender courtesan and singer in Paris of the 1850s and 1860s
- Eliza Lynch (1835–1886), Irish courtesan, de facto wife of Francisco Solano López, president of Paraguay
- Harriette Wilson (1786–1846), British courtesan
- La Belle Otero (1868–1965), Spanish courtesan
- La Païva (1819–1884), French demimonde-courtesan ('Grande Horizontale') of the Second Empire
- Liane de Pougy (1869–1950), French courtesan and Folies Bergère-dancer
- Lola Montez (1821–1861), Irish dancer, mistress of king Ludwig I of Bavaria
- Marie Duplessis (1824–1847), French courtesan, one of the best known from the era of Louis Philippe
- Marthe de Florian (1864–1939), French courtesan and socialite
- Olympe Pélissier (1799–1878), French courtesan and model, second wife of Gioachino Rossini
- Sai Jinhua (1872–1936), Chinese courtesan

=== 20th century ===
- Marguerite Alibert (1890–1971), French courtesan, lover, but not official royal mistress of Prince Edward
- Mata Hari (1876–1917), courtesan and spy

== In fiction ==
- Angellica Bianca in Aphra Behn's 1677 play The Rover.
- Bianca in William Shakespeare's Othello is considered a courtesan to Cassio.
- Bianca, who appears in Anne Rice's The Vampire Armand, is a courtesan.
- In John Cleland's Fanny Hill: or, the Memoirs of a Woman of Pleasure, Fanny goes from poor orphaned country girl to wealthy skilled courtesan eventually finding her one true love and retiring to marriage. Her history is told in the first person through several letters to friends detailing her life as a courtesan.
- In Sarah Dunant's In the Company of the Courtesan, Fiammetta Bianchini, a renowned courtesan of Rome, and her sharp-witted dwarf rise to success among the intrigue and secrets of Renaissance Venice.
- In the book A Great and Terrible Beauty, Pippa accuses Felicity of having a mother who is a courtesan and a consort, and who ran away to France not only to run a salon, but to be with her lover, a Frenchman.
- Inara Serra is a 26th-century Alliance companion, a position inspired by courtesans, in Joss Whedon's TV series Firefly.
- Kamala, in Hermann Hesse's Siddhartha.
- Komagata Yumi in the manga Rurouni Kenshin.
- La Dame aux Camélias is a novel about a courtesan by French author Alexandre Dumas, fils that was turned into the opera La Traviata by Italian composer Giuseppe Verdi. In the novel, the courtesan's name is Marguerite Gautier; in the opera, it is Violetta Valéry. "La Traviata" in Italian translates "The Wayward One".
- Lysandra in the book series Throne of Glass by Sarah J. Maas, a shape-shifting courtesan working to pay off her debts and care for her rescued acolyte, Evangeline.
- Madame Gabrielle from Dora Levy Mossanen. Courtesan: A Novel. Touchstone, 2005. ISBN 0-7432-4678-0
- Magda in Puccini's La rondine.
- Many examples in Indian literature and Bollywood films: tawaif Sahibjaan in Pakeezah, tawaif Umrao Jaan in the Urdu novel Umrao Jaan Ada and its adaptations, tawaif Chandramukhi in Devdas.
- Mira Nair's 1996 film Kama Sutra: A Tale of Love highlights the profession of courtesans in 16th-century India, featuring Rasa Devi (Rekha) and Maya (Indira Varma).
- Nana, in Emile Zola's eponymous novel of 1880 is a courtesan.
- Odette de Crecy from Marcel Proust's In Search of Lost Time is a courtesan of the French Belle Epoque, she gains a notorious reputation from cavorting with aristocrats, artists and bourgeois, of both sexes.
- Paola and Sister Teodora were the leaders of the courtesans of Florence and Venice (respectively) in the video game Assassin's Creed II. In its sequel, Assassin's Creed: Brotherhood, Madame Solari is shown to be the leader of the courtesans in Rome. Courtesans also provide a gameplay mechanic in the two games, main character Ezio Auditore can hire small groups of courtesans that can be used to escort the assassin without being noticed, and to distract hostile guards.
- Phèdre nó Delaunay, the premier courtesan of Terre D'Ange in Jacqueline Carey's Kushiel's Legacy novels.
- Satine, played by Nicole Kidman, an actress/courtesan who falls in love with a penniless poet/writer played by Ewan McGregor, in Baz Luhrmann's 2001 film, Moulin Rouge!.
- Sha'ira, an asari "Consort" from the Mass Effect computer game series.
- The Broadway plays, musicals, and movies based upon the book Gigi are about a young Parisian girl who is being trained to be a courtesan by her great-aunt, a retired career courtesan herself.
- Ulla Winblad, in the famous 18th-century poems of Carl Michael Bellman.
- Vasantasena, a nagarvadhu in the ancient Indian Sanskrit play Mṛcchakatika by Śūdraka.
- Vittoria Corombona in John Webster's play The White Devil. She is described in the alternative title of the play as 'the famous Venetian Curtizan'.
- In the movie Balls of Fury, Diedrich Bader plays one of Feng's many, all-male courtesans of pleasure.
- Chéri, written by French author Colette, is about an aging courtesan named Léa de Lonval, who is near the end of her most intense love affair, with Fred Peloux- known as Chéri to almost everyone around him.
- The Apothecary Diaries, or Kusuriya no Hitorigoto, a Japanese light novel series and anime, frequently features three high-ranking courtesans named Pairin, Meimei, and Jouka. The women are collectively referred to as "the Three Princesses" to denote their status.

== See also ==
- Related topics
  - Grisette, in France
  - Pilegesh, concubine in Hebrew
  - Prostitute
  - Religious prostitution
  - Sugar baby, contemporary counterpart
  - Sycophant, obedient flatterer
- Similar professions
  - Almeh, in the Middle East
  - Ca trù, in Vietnam
  - Gē-tòaⁿ, in Taiwan
  - Hetaera, in ancient Greece
  - Kisaeng, in Korea
  - Nagarvadhu, in ancient India
  - Gaṇikā, in ancient India
  - Tawaif, in India
  - Oiran, in historic Japan
  - Qiyān, in the Middle East
  - Shamakhi dancers, in Azerbaijan
  - Gējì, in Ancient China

== Sources ==
- Dalby, Liza. "Geisha, 25th Anniversary Edition, Updated Edition". Berkeley, CA: University of California Press, 2008. Print.
- Gaite, Carmen Martín. Love Customs in Eighteenth-Century Spain. Berkeley: University of California Press, 1991.
- Griffin, Susan (2001). The Book of the Courtesans: a Catalogue of Their Virtues. New York: Broadway Books
- Hickman, Katie (2003). Courtesans: Money, Sex, and Fame in the Nineteenth Century. New York: HarperCollins
- Lawner, Lynne (1987). Lives of the Courtesans: Portraits of the Renaissance. New York: Rizzoli
- Peletz, Michael G. "Gender, Sexuality, and Body Politics in Modern Asia". Ann Arbor, MI: Association for Asian Studies, 2007. Print.
- Rounding, Virginia (2003). Grandes Horizontales: The Lives and Legends of Four Nineteenth-Century Courtesans. London: Bloomsbury
