= Ludwigs Erbe =

Public sculpture in Germany

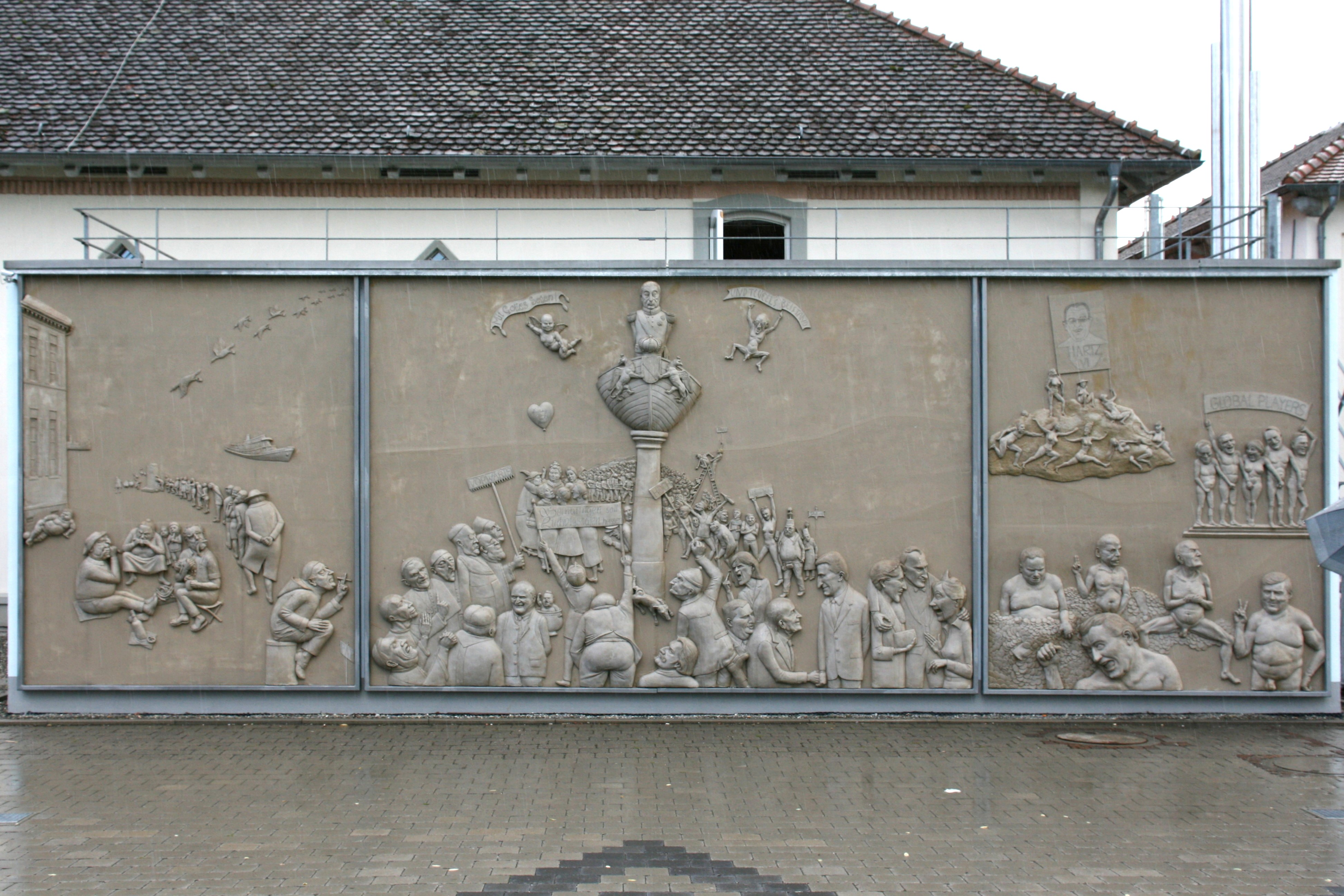
Bodman-Ludwigshafen - Ludwigshafen - Hafenstraße - Ludwigs Erbe 03 ies

The triptych, Ludwigs Erbe is an artwork of the sculptor Peter Lenk, on the wall of the town hall of Ludwigshafen am Bodensee, Germany. The sculpture attracted attention nationwide because it features naked representations of famous politicians, including Angela Merkel.

== History of the artwork ==
The art project was initiated by the local association for promotion of tourism in 2003 and was approved in a council meeting under the working title "Toilet Drama and Feudalism".

Contrary to what was reported in the media, the artwork was not funded by the municipality with taxpayers' money. Instead the association of Kunstfreunde Bodman-Ludwigshafen e.V. contributed to the costs of creating the artwork, which are estimated between €30,000 and €35,000 (according to minutes of the municipal council); the community contributed €1,500 towards the artwork.

According to Lenk, only the middle section of the triptych was transferred to the art association. The two side sections initially remained in Lenk's possession and were offered for sale to the municipality in 2010. The July 2010 the municipal council decided to buy the two side sections for €40,000, and in November the art association decided to transfer the middle section to the municipality. In return, the municipality undertook to keep the triptych in its entirety and make it publicly available.

== Description of the artwork ==
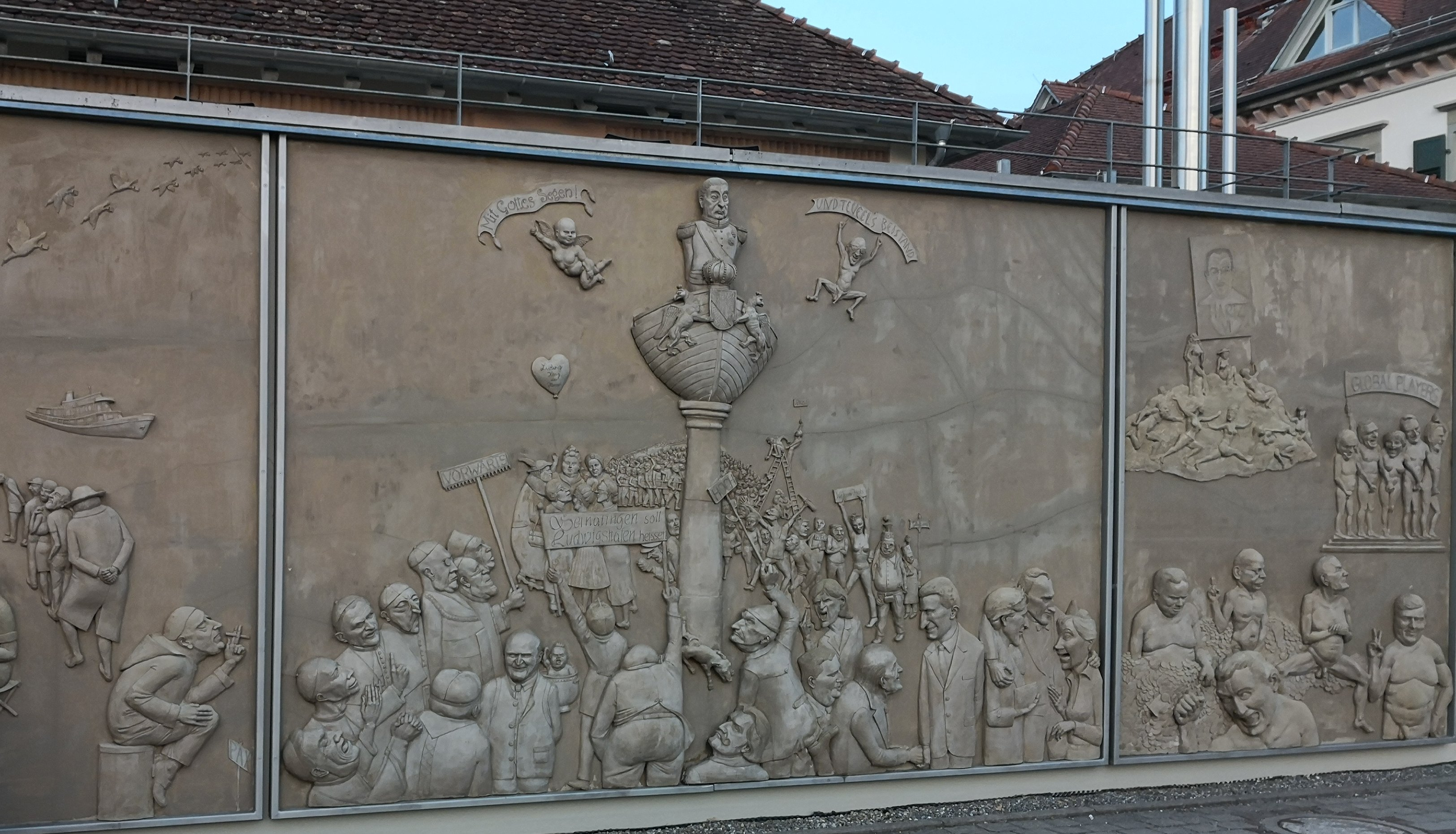
Photo of Peter Lenk's sculpture Ludwigs Erbe

The title of the artwork alludes to Grand Duke Ludwig von Baden who governed Ludwigshafen for twelve years and gave the town its name. In the middle section of the triptych, the Grand Duke sits on a throne overlooking the scene in which mainly current people and events are satirised.

In the right section of the artwork, five politicians are represented naked and touching each other's genitals: under the banner "Global Players" the represented characters appear to be Hans Eichel, Gerhard Schröder, Angela Merkel, Edmund Stoiber and Guido Westerwelle. At the bottom, renowned top managers are represented bathing in gold coins like the cartoon character Scrooge McDuck. The characters here appear to be Josef Ackermann, Daimler boss Dieter Zetsche, the former chairman of the Volkswagen board Ferdinand Piëch and the former head of Energie Baden-Württemberg Utz Claassen.
