= Peter Lenk =

German sculptor

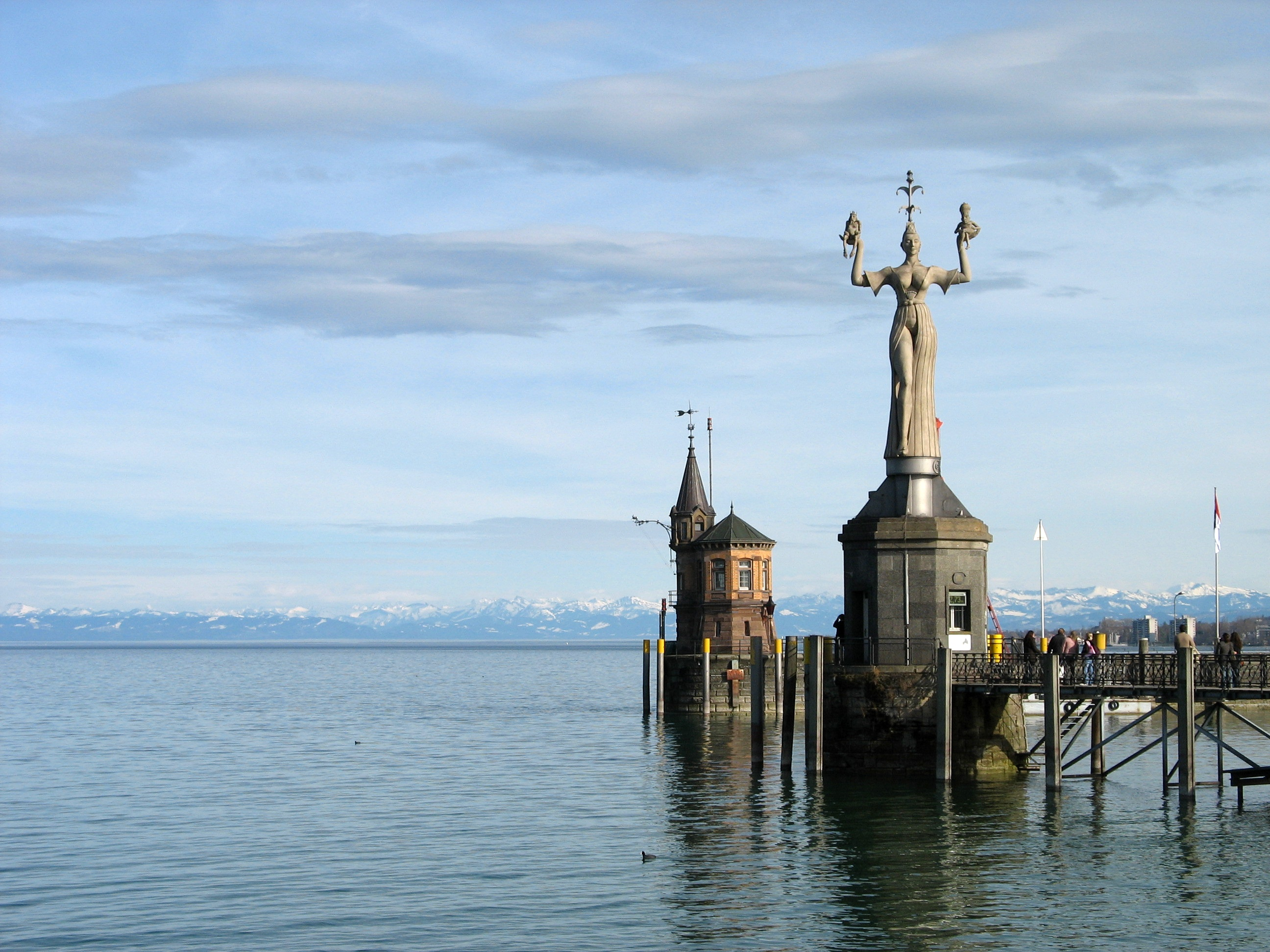
Lenk's Imperia in Konstanz harbor

Peter Lenk (born 6 June 1947, in Nuremberg) is a German sculptor based in Bodman-Ludwigshafen on Lake Constance, known for the controversial sexual content of his public art.

== Art ==
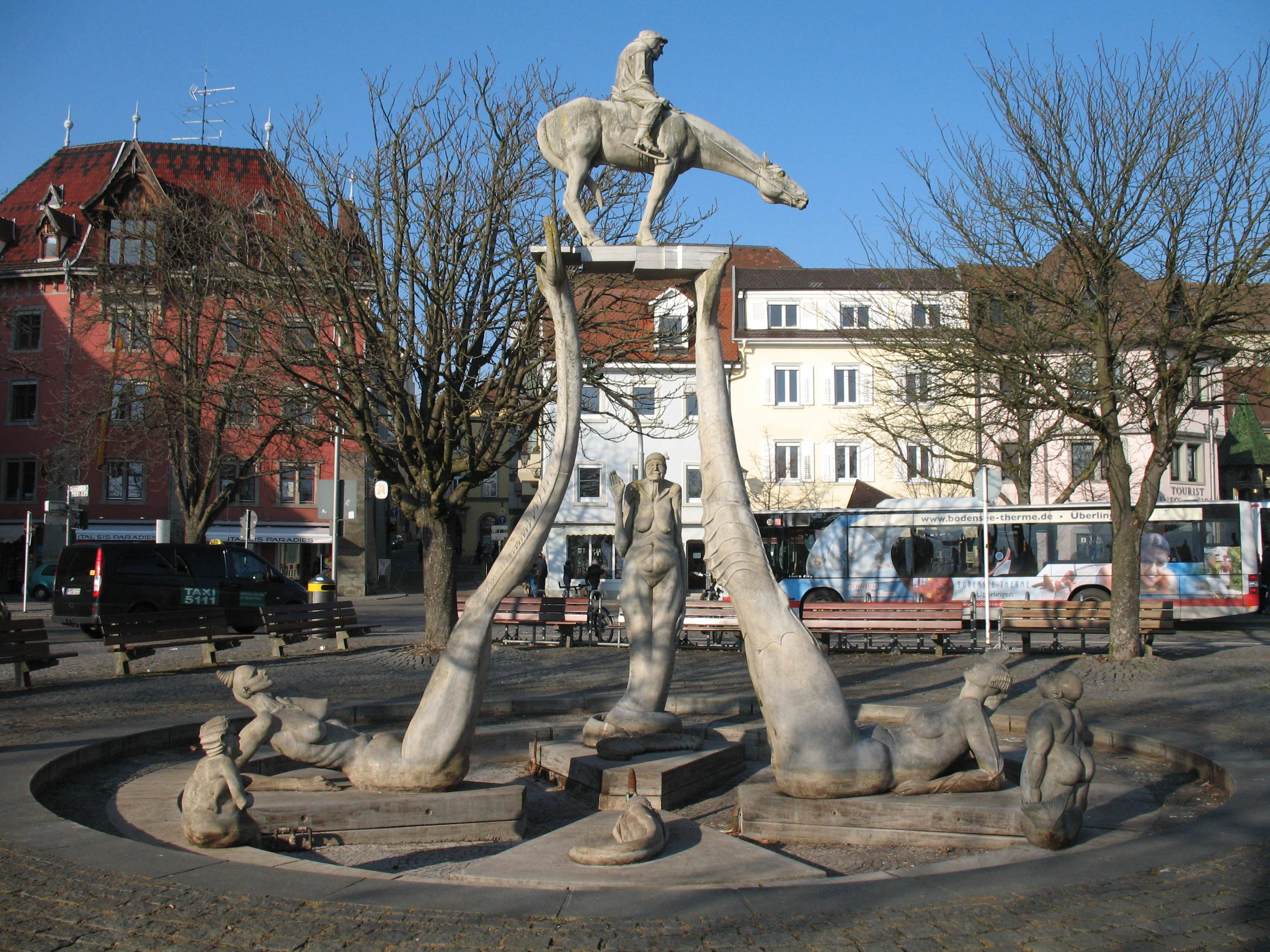
Fountain in Überlingen

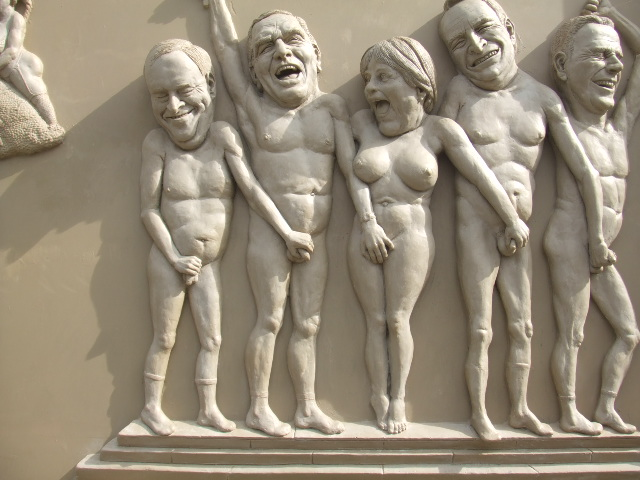
Detail of the relief Ludwigs Erbe in Bodman-Ludwigshafen. From left to right: Hans Eichel, Gerhard Schröder, Angela Merkel, Edmund Stoiber and Guido Westerwelle

Lenk's artworks include:

- Imperia, a ten-meter-tall rotating statue in the harbor of Konstanz, (Germany), depicting a fictional courtesan from a short story by Balzac. Although it was highly controversial when installed in 1993, today it is "the most photographed attraction in the city". A detail from the sculpture, a nude figure of Pope Martin V, was displayed in the Konstanz train station in 2010, but was removed after complaints from the Catholic church and CDU politicians.
- Ludwigs Erbe, a relief sculpture in the town square of Bodman-Ludwigshafen that shows various German politicians engaged in sexual play.
- A sculpture on the exterior of the office building in Berlin that houses die Tageszeitung, depicting the editor of a competing newspaper sporting an enormous penis.
- A sculpture of Volker Kauder wearing only a skirt made of bananas, like one worn by Josephine Baker, for a benefit auction.
- A statue of German writer Martin Walser wearing ice skates while he rides a horse that stands on the tails of two giant reclining mermaids in a fountain, at the boat landing in Überlingen.
- Hölderlin im Kreisverkehr, a monument to German poet Friedrich Hölderlin installed in 2003 in a traffic roundabout in Lauffen am Neckar.

== Books ==
Lenk is the author or co-author of:

- Skulpturen: Bilder, Briefe, Kommentare (Konstanz: Stadler Verlagsges. Mbh, 2005, ISBN 978-3-7977-0516-7).
- Magische Säule Meersburg: Skulpturen (with Helmut Weidhase, Konstanz: Stadler Verlagsges. Mbh, 2007, ISBN 978-3-7977-0540-2).
