= Cortigiana onesta =

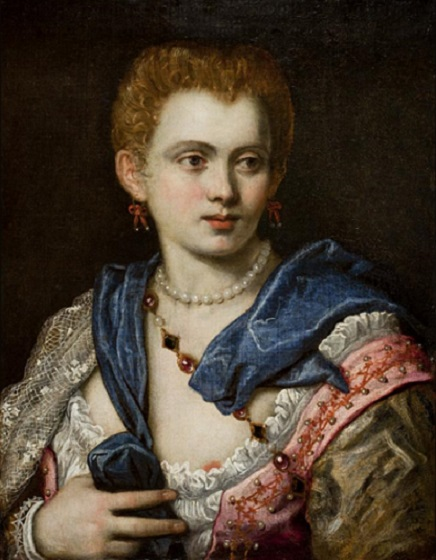
Veronica Franco.

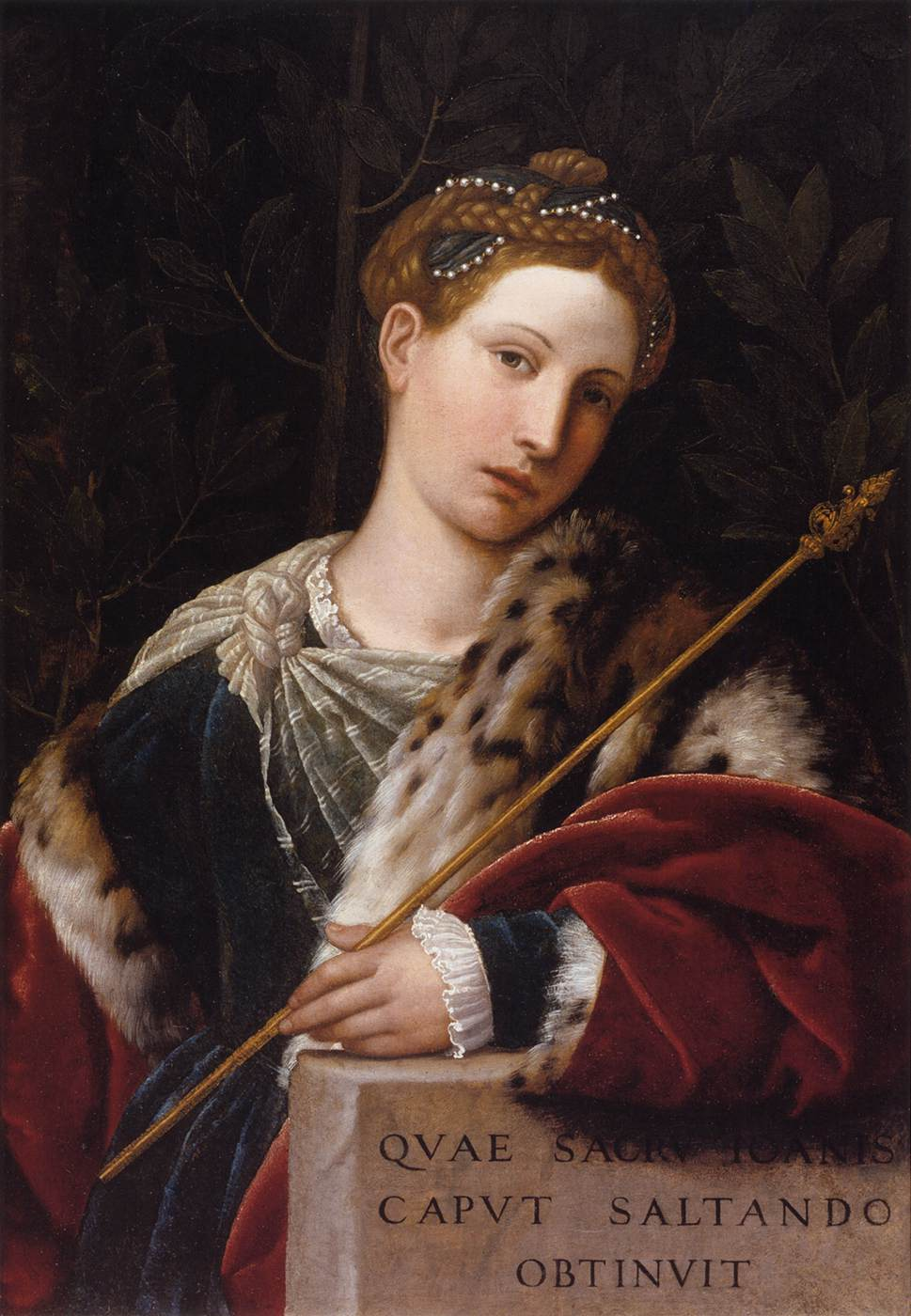
Moretto da Brescia - Portrait of Tullia d'Aragona as Salome - WGA16230

Cortigiana onesta (Italian: "honored courtesan") was a term used for a specific category of prostitutes in Renaissance Italy. They are primarily associated with Rome and the Republic of Venice, though they were also present elsewhere in Italy. As a category of sex workers, they were distinguished by their self-presentation, which featured lavish consumption, luxurious attire, and an education aligned with the Renaissance ideals of the time. They have been compared to the hetairai of antiquity. Many courtesans of this type served as models for renowned artists and as muses for famous writers and poets; some were poets themselves.

== Description ==
=== Identity and Role ===
A cortigiana onesta was a courtesan. She distinguished herself from other sex workers by having received a refined education and by having learned to dress, behave, and speak like an upper-class lady; a deliberate strategy to set herself apart from other prostitutes. A courtesan of this type catered to clients from the upper classes — often influential men within the Church or the state — and frequently managed to circumvent the laws and regulations imposed upon other prostitutes.

The cortigiana onesta was known for embodying the contemporary ideal of the Renaissance woman—a *puella docta* (learned woman). She was educated in literature and the arts, and has been compared to the hetairai of antiquity. Many of these women became famous as public figures in their own time; among the most renowned were Tullia d'Aragona and Veronica Franco.

=== Work conditions ===
Courtesans belonged to the small minority of sex workers who could become wealthy through their trade, whch was a rarity in the profession. However, because a courtesan was expected to maintain a luxurious lifestyle as part of her professional role, saving money proved difficult. Consequently, many courtesans were unable to retain their earnings; by the time they were forced to retire, they had no savings left, and thus frequently ended their lives in poverty. A courtesan who managed to save money and retred with a fortune was described as a "prudent courtesan", which was not unknown, but described as rare.

Courtesans also faced specific risks, often at the hands of jealous male clients. Two such risks were particularly notorious:

- sfregia — the act of ruining a courtesan by slashing her face with a knife;
- trentuno or trentuno reale — gang rape, which allegedly involved 31 or 79 men, respectively. This left the courtesan unable to continue commanding high prices and transformed her from a courtesan to an ordinary prostitute.

== History ==
Rome and Venice were well-known centers for their culture of courtesans, though such women were also active in other parts of Italy. Tullia d'Aragona, for instance, was active in Florence.

=== Rome and Venice ===
The term is known from the second half of the 15th century. In Rome, the period spanning the reigns of Popes Alexander VI and Leo X is considered the era of the courtesans.

The profession emerged in Rome toward the end of the 15th century, as the papal court grew increasingly magnificent and placed greater emphasis on formal display. This coincided with a broader trend across Renaissance Europe, where princely courts developed more elaborate public-facing representation; a form of representation in which the presence of women was considered essential. This posed a challenge at the papal court, however, where the men were predominantly clergy and thus had no wives to bring to receptions, and the Roman noblewoman traditionally lived in a high degree of sex segregation. Consequently, they began bringing along hired women to fill this role — women who were expected to conduct themselves with elegance. Imperia La Divina has been described as the first of these.

Courtesans also played a particularly significant role in the Republic of Venice. Venetian culture dictated a very secluded life for the wives of the men who governed the Republic. In Venice, prostitution had been confined, between 1360 and 1422, to the Castelletto district, and later to Carampane in the Rialto area. During the 16th-century Renaissance, a distinct culture of courtesans emerged; these women were educated according to Renaissance ideals — known as puella doctae — and were referred to as cortigiana onesta. Among the most famous of these are Marietta Mirtilla, Giulia Lombardo, Cornelia Griffa, La Zafetta, and Veronica Franco.

=== Decline ===
This class of courtesans was strongly associated with the Renaissance. As ideals shifted, the public role that these courtesans had occupied during the 16th century vanished; by the 17th century, prostitutes no longer held such a visible position.

In Rome, courtesans were first ordered to be expelled in 1523. Although this ban was not strictly enforced, the public culture of the courtesan was definitively eradicated after the popes of the Counter-Reformation came to power following 1555.

In 1566, a papal decree ordered all prostitutes to leave Rome within six days; a directive that was, on this occasion, actually carried out. Twenty-four of the most prominent courtesans departed the city immediately; however, many of the women who followed — the means to pay for an armed escort — were robbed and murdered by highwaymen just outside the city. In Venice, by contrast, the phenomenon persisted throughout the remainder of the century.
