= Imperia Cognati =

Italian courtesan

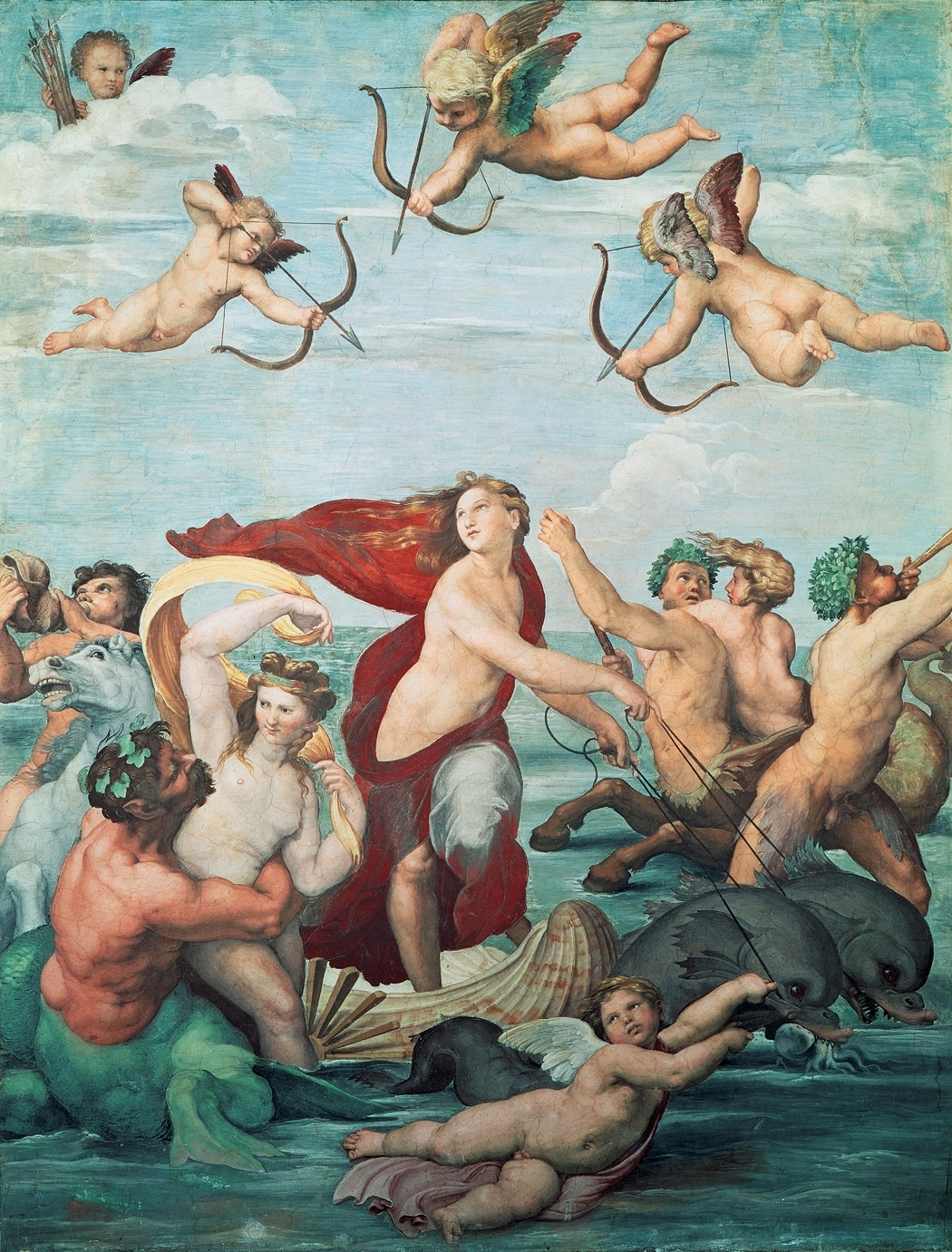
Imperia was the model for Raphael's The Triumph of Galatea

Imperia Cognati (also called Imperia La Divina, meaning Imperia The Divine; also, The Queen of Courtesans, 3 August 1486 – 15 August 1512) was a Roman courtesan. She has been considered the first celebrity of the courtesan class which emerged in Rome in the late 15th century.

== Historical background ==
In the 15th century, the courtiers of the Papal court developed the custom of hiring female escorts to accompany them in court life. As the Papal courtiers were clerics who were banned from marrying, the women they consorted with could not be marriageable, but at the same time, they must be educated and know their etiquette to be able to converse and participate in formal court life. This was the development of a new class of prostitutes in Christian Europe: the courtesan, which then spread from Rome to other parts of Europe, and Imperia was to become the first famous representative of this new type of prostitute. Courtesans by custom kept a main client as a steady supporter, while in addition openly entertaining others as temporary clients.

== Name and origin ==
Imperia was born the daughter of Diana di Pietro Cognati (other sources give Cugnati or Corgnati), a Roman prostitute. Her father was called Paris, either by given name or "De Paris" as a toponymic surname. It has thus been speculated that Paris de Grassis, the later master of ceremonies of Pope Julius II, could have been her father when he was young. Imperia called herself in documents "Imperia (di Pietro) Cognati", while in her will she referred to herself as "Imperia de Paris". She has been later referred to by the name of Lucrezia, which was the name of her daughter and probably not her own given name.

There are further uncertainties about the year and place of her birth. Besides 1486, there are sources which claim she was born on 3 August 1481, five years earlier. The place of her birth is commonly claimed to be Rome, or more specifically the Via Alessandrina in the district of Borgo. However, it is also said she hailed from Ferrara.

== Career ==
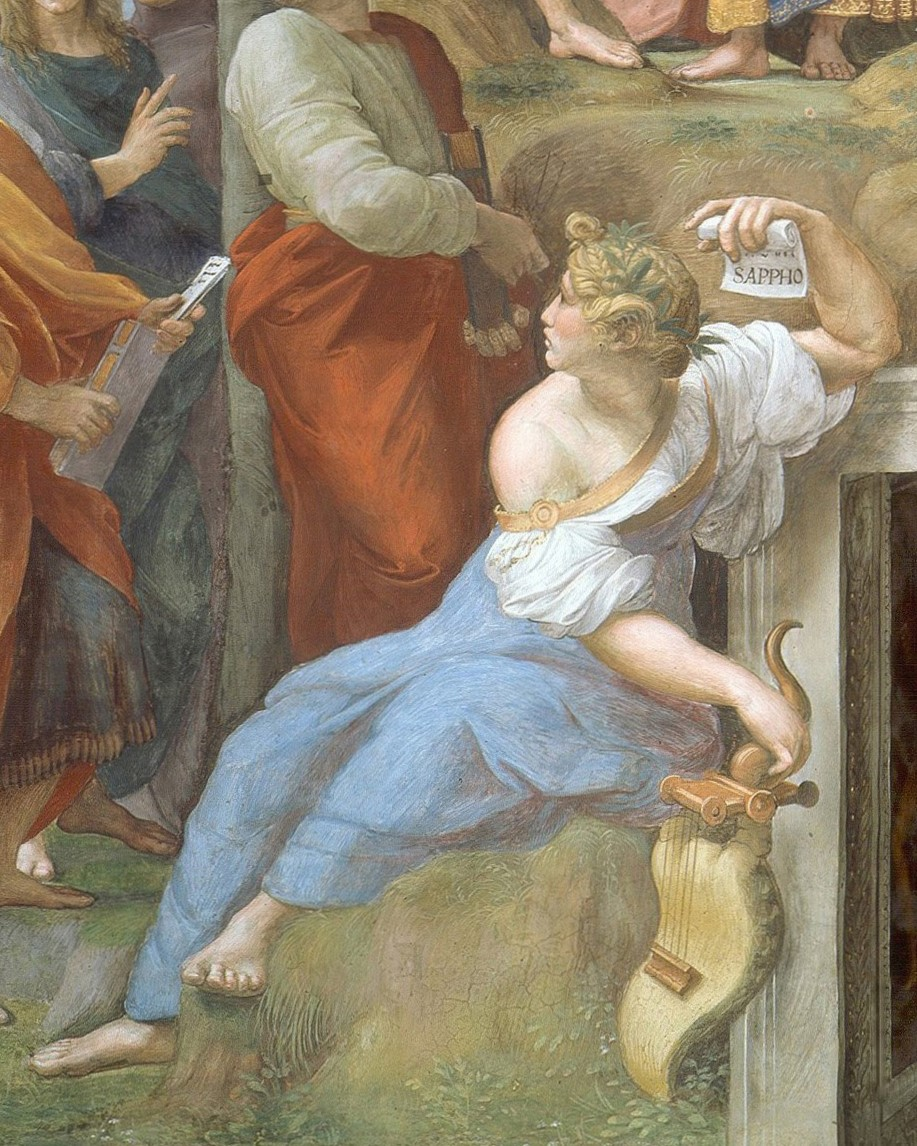
Detail of Sappho from Raphael's Parnassus (1510–11), modelled by Imperia.

She either chose the name of Imperia early on as her business name or only started offering her body after the birth of her daughter. Either way, soon after her entrance into the business, she was considered the archetype of a courtesan. Contemporary sources praised her charm and intelligence. Imperia's regular and main client, the banker Agostino Chigi, was at this point called the richest banker in the world. He financed Imperia to maintain what was called a royal standard of living, and she kept both a palace in Rome and a country villa outside the city.

As was the custom for courtesans, she spent her days by the window, where she displayed her appearance to passers by. She was known to be courted by the men of the Papal court, but her tactic was to remain exclusive and accept only few clients, while she still surrounded herself with courtiers from noble families. Her friends included Raphael, for whose paintings Imperia acted as a model more than once. Several anecdotes survive showing her salacious wit: for example, above her doorstep was an inscription inviting only those who would bring esprit, wit and good mood and who would leave money or a considerable present when leaving. There was also the saying that Rome was blessed by the Gods twice: Mars gave them the Imperium Romanum, while Venus gave them the Imperia.

== Known lovers ==
- Filippo Beroaldo the younger, poet and librarian
- Angelo di Bufalo, banker
- Agostino Chigi, banker
- Angelo Colocci, papal secretary under Leo X
- Tommaso Inghirami, papal librarian
- Blosio Palladio, poet and architect
- Raphael, painter
- Jacopo Sadoleto, later a cardinal

== Death ==
Legends surround Imperia's death. It was said she took poison on 13 August 1512, prepared her will and died two days later, despite Chigi bringing the most skilled physicians to her deathbed. Several reasons for her committing suicide are rumoured: that she had been genuinely in love with Angelo del Bufalo, with whom her contact had ended; or that she felt replaced by Chigi's younger mistress; or of an affair of honour involving Pope Julius II demanding her death.

However, the author Pietro Aretino, her contemporary, claimed that Imperia died "rich, venerated and dignified in her own house".

Agostino Chigi financed a stately funeral in Rome, which was sensational for a prostitute. Her monument in San Gregorio al Celio did not survive to the present day.

== Family ==
At the age of 14 or 17 she gave birth to her daughter Lucrezia. The paternity of the child is unclear but many historians suppose Chigi to be Lucrezia's father; he also claimed it himself. In Imperia's will of 1512, Lucrezia was named her heir, with the cantor of the papal chapel Paolo Trotti as her stepfather.

Imperia made Agostino Chigi, Ulisse Lanciarini da Fano, and Paolo and Diana di Trevi the executors of her will and asked Chigi to arrange a marriage for her daughter. Lucrezia grew up in Siena or in the convent of St. Mary in Campo Marzio, leading a sheltered and virtuous life before marrying Arcangelo Colonna and having two sons. Until 1521, there was a court battle with her grandmother Diana who was given only 100 ducats from Imperia's will. On 9 January 1522, Lucrezia poisoned herself as the only way of fending off the advances of Cardinal Raffaele Petrucci. She survived the suicide attempt and was considered an even more virtuous woman.

Existence of Imperia's second daughter by Chigi, Margherita, has not been proven and is doubted by historians.

== Portrayals in literature and art ==
- Imperia La Divina is portrayed in contemporary literature, such as a novel by Matteo Bandello, and was the subject of many legends and stories.
- She was a friend of Raphael and the model of several of his works: as a muse, as Galatea in Triumph of Galatea in Villa Farnesina, as Sappho in The Parnassus in the Vatican Palace, and as a sibyl on Chigi's designated tomb at Santa Maria della Pace.
- Honoré de Balzac described a courtesan called Imperia in his 1832 short story "La Belle Impéria" in his collection Les Cent Contes drolatiques. The story takes place at the time of the Council of Konstanz, 100 years before the death of Imperia Cognati.
- Balzac's character of Imperia has been portrayed by the German painter Lovis Corinth in The Fair Imperia (1925), and inspired the 1993 larger-than-life Imperia statue in the harbour of Konstanz.
- The historical Imperia has been portrayed in 2005 by the actress Manuela Arcuri in an Italian TV film production Imperia, la grande cortigiana.
- She appears as a character in the historical mystery, The Wolves of St. Peter's, by Gina Buonaguro and Janice Kirk.
- She appears as a character in the historical story, Aranyködben fáznak az istenek, by László Passuth.

== Literature ==
- Melissa Hope Ditmore: Encyclopedia of Prostitution and Sex Work, Volym 1
- Diana Maury Robin, Anne R. Larsen, Carole Levin: Encyclopedia of Women in the Renaissance: Italy, France, and England
- The Courtesan: The Part She Has Played in Classic and Modern Literature and in Life (1926)
- Martha Feldman, Bonnie Gordo: The Courtesan's Arts: Cross-Cultural Perspectives Includes CD
- Gaia Servadio: Renaissance Woman
