= Toulouse Indian Film Festival =

The Festival des cinémas indiens de Toulouse/Toulouse Indian Film Festival is a film festival held annually in Toulouse, France since 2013. As its name indicates it is dedicated to introducing the public to Indian cinema.

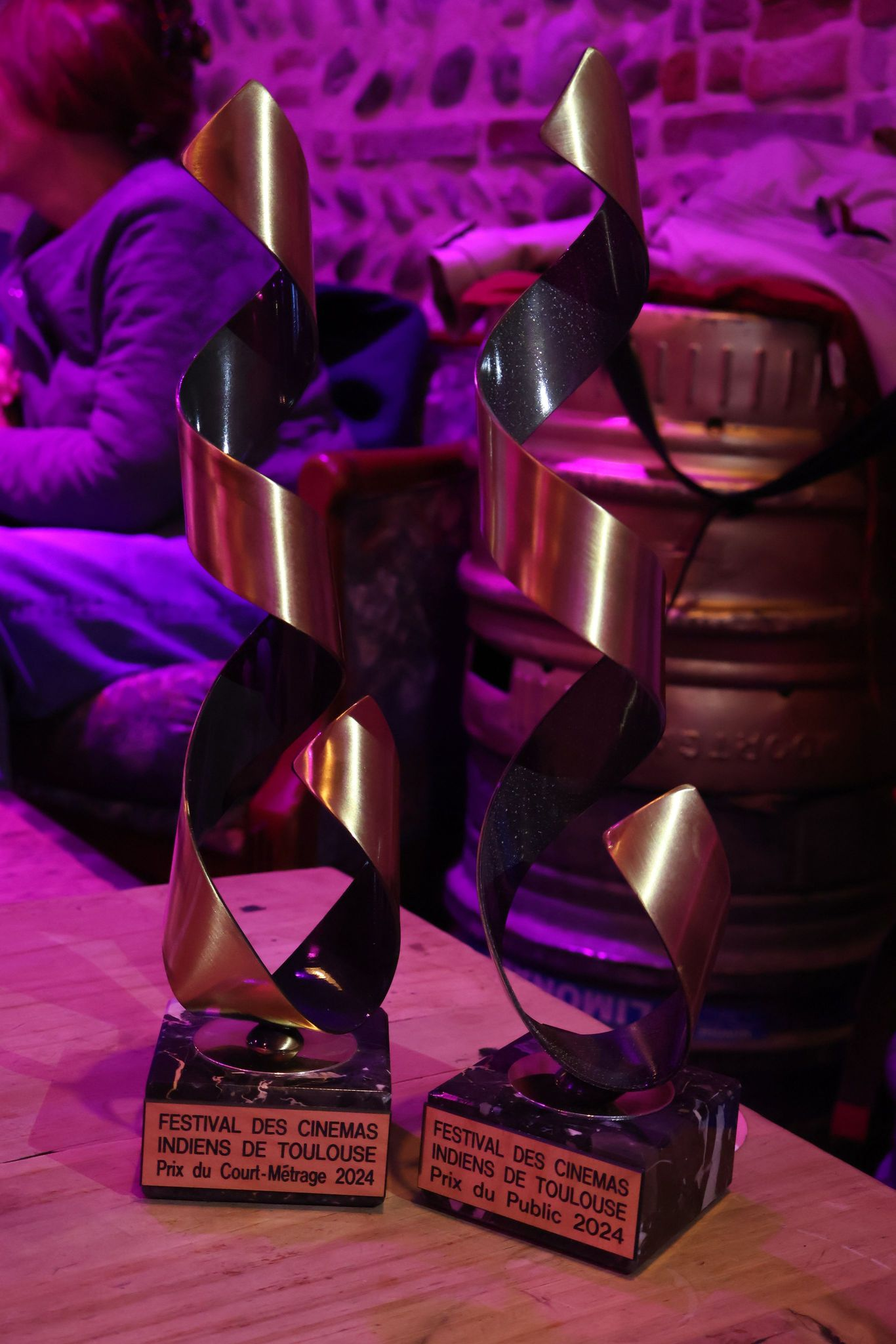

== History ==
The idea was floated in 2012 by a group of non-profit organisations and the first edition was held in early 2013 under the name 'Indian Season'. It was rechristened to its present name in 2015.

The first edition of the Festival was held in 2013. An Audience Choice Award was instituted in the fourth edition, in 2016. A jury award was added for the sixth edition, in 2018. Starting from the seventh edition, in 2019, the critics choice award would be set up the Film Critics Circle of India.

The Toulouse Indian Film Festival features a lineup that ensures gender parity between female and male directors across all competitions.

From 2025, Toulouse Indian Film Festival adds the Student's Choice Award.

From 2026, Toulouse Indian Film Festival opens the short-films competition to all Asian productions and names it Asia Connexion.

The festival was founded by Vanessa Frederique Bianchi.

== Awards ==
=== 2016 ===
- Audience Choice Award – Parched

=== 2017 ===
- Audience Choice Award – Vaagai Sooda Vaa and Onaatah

=== 2018 ===
- Audience Choice Award – Western Ghats /Merku Thodarchi Malai and Newton
- Jury Award – Newton

=== 2019 ===
The members of the 2019 critics jury are Baradwaj Rangan (chair), Dalton L, Deepa Gahlot, Gautam Kaul, Johnson Thomas, Ratnottama Sengupta, and Utpal Datta. The palmares is:

- Jury prize for feature film: Ee.Ma.Yau by Lijo Jose Pellissery
- Jury prize for short film: Unlock by Niru Nadarajah
- Jury special mention: Doitto by Tathagata Gosh
- Jury special mention: Pariyerum Perumal by Mari Selvaraj
- Audience award: Pariyerum Perumal by Mari Selvaraj
- FCCI Award for Best Debut Film: Pariyerum Perumal by Mari Selvaraj

=== 2020 ===
- Jury Prize for feature film: Trees under the sun/Veyilmarangal by Dr. Biju
- Jury Special mention ex aequo: Axone A Recipe for Disaster by Nicholas Kharkongor by and Zollywood by Trushant Ingle
- Jury prize for short film: Nooreh by Ashish Pandey
- Jury Special mention ex aequo: Bebaak (film) by Shazia Iqbal and Miss Man by Tathagata Ghosh

=== 2024 ===
- Audience Choice Award for feature film: 12th Fail by Vidhu Vinod Chopra
- Audience Choice Award for short film: If by Tathagata Ghosh

=== 2025 ===
- Audience Choice Award for feature film: Little Jaffna by Lawrence Valin
- Audience Choice Award for short film: Sultan by Avinash Kambikar
- Jury Prize for feature film ex aequo: The Storyteller by Ananth Mahadevan and Village Rockstars 2 by Rima Das
- Jury Special mention: Farming the Revolution by Nishtha Jain
- Student's Choice Award: Bad Girl by Varsha Bharath
- Student's Choice Award Special Mention ex aequo: Rhythm of Dammam by Jayan K. Cherian and Village Rockstars 2 by Rima Das
- Jury prize for short film: Shackles of Sky by Ragu Aarav
- Jury Special mention ex aequo: Mic Drop by Kallol Mukherjee and Age of Learning by Shuvangi Khadka
