= Kautik International Student Film Festival =

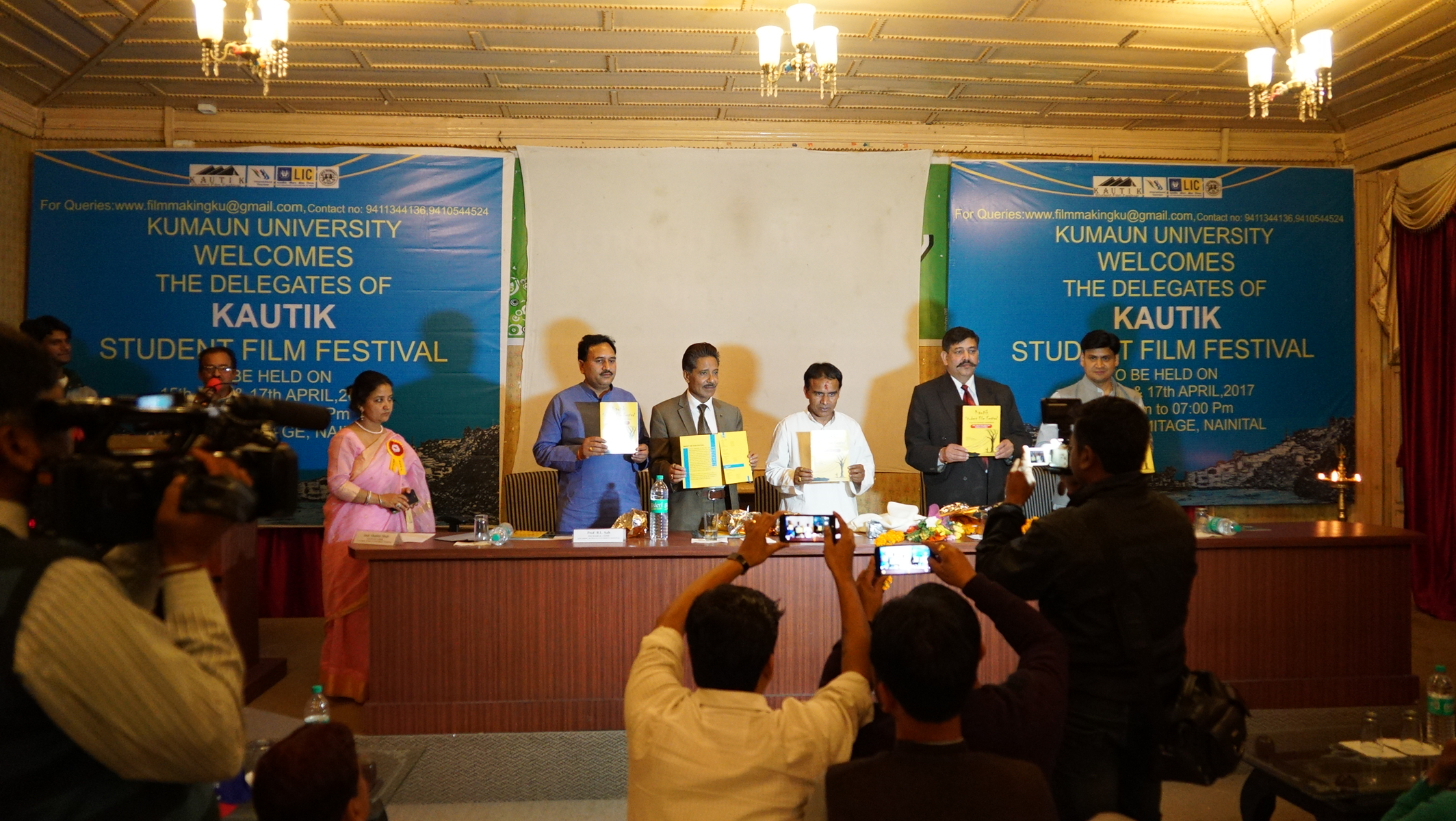
Artistic director Shalini Shah with ministers, university councillors, et al.

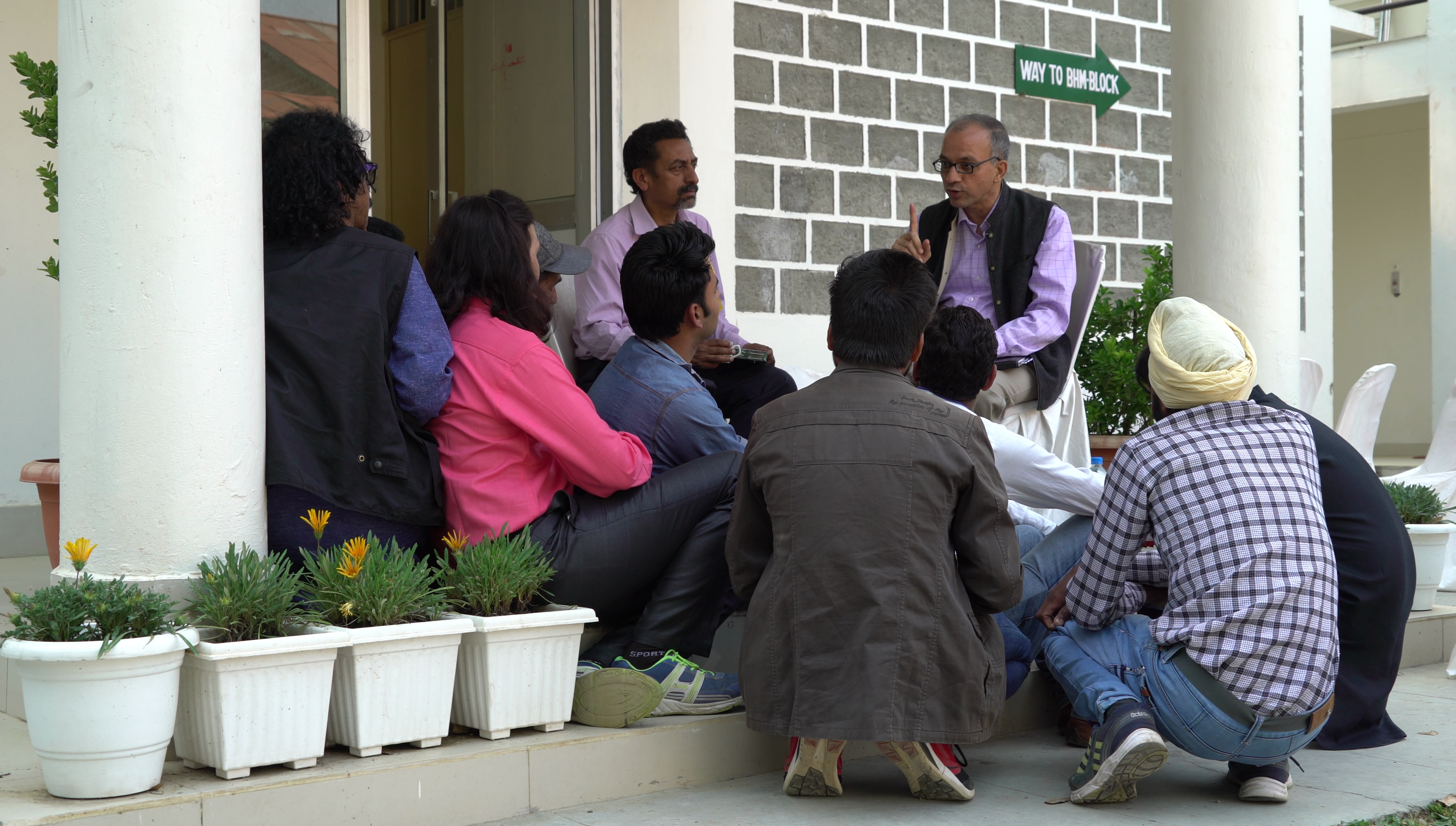
FTII director Bhupendra Kainthola offers valuable tips to the student organisers.

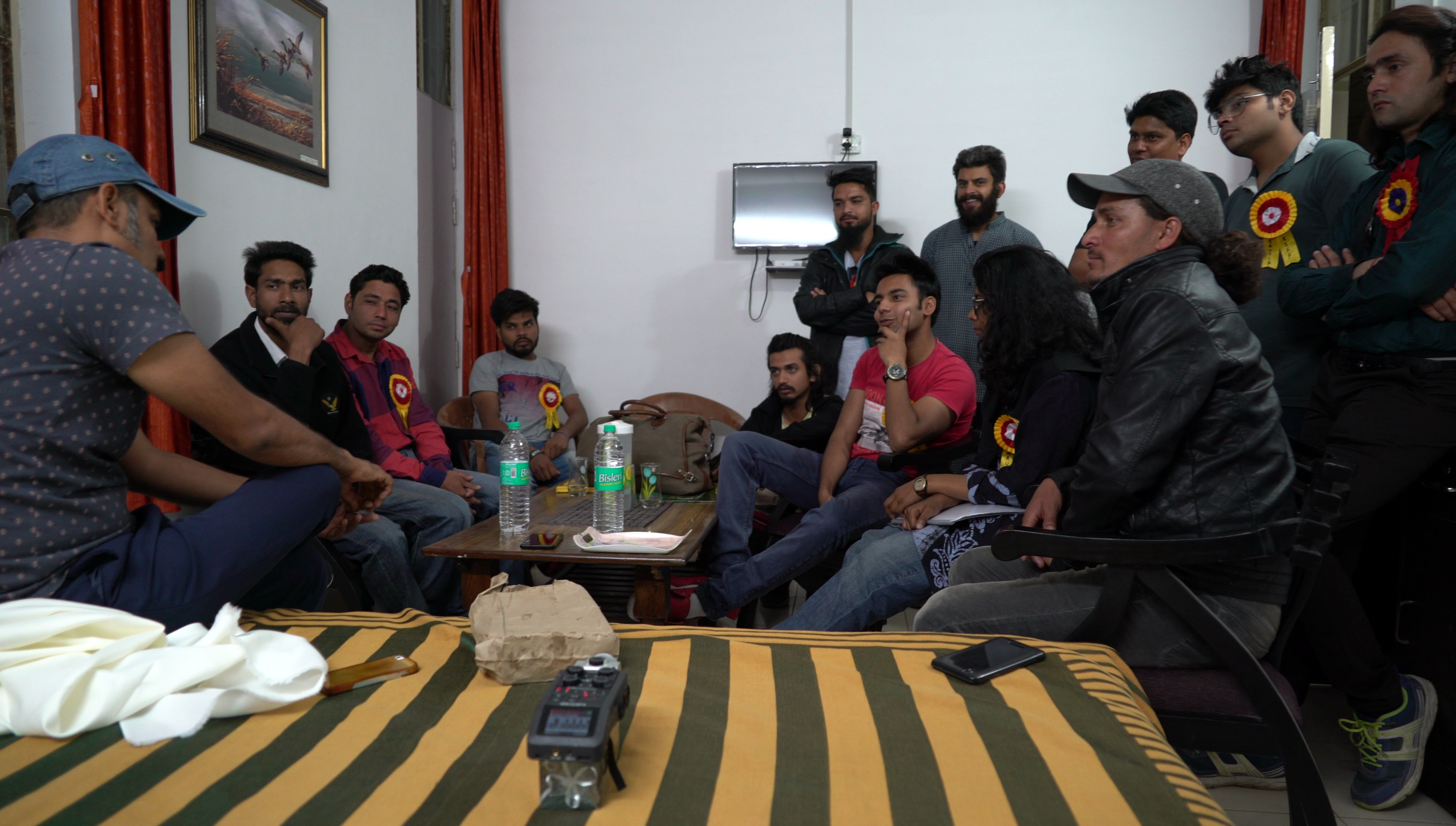
Kamaljeet Negi offers cinematography tips to the student organisers.

Kautik International Student Film Festival is a 10-day competitive international student film festival, organised by CEFM-the Hermitage, Kumaun University, Nainital, Uttarakhand, in association with the Himalayan Society for Art, Culture, Education, Environment and Film Development (HIMACEEF) promoted by filmmakers/academicians Rajesh Shah (the Festival Director; FTII—Cinematography batch of 1992) and National Award winning documentary filmmaker Shalini Shah. The duo are film faculty members at the University. The festival is attended by students, theatre artistes, cinematographers, filmmakers and ministers.

== Advisory board ==
- Virendra Saini
- CK Muralidharan
- Amole Gupte
- Tigmanshu Dhulia
- Kamaljeet Negi
- Sriram Raghavan
- Amit Khanna
- Dalton

== History of the Festival ==
Kamaun University in the year 2016 initiated a few unconventional courses; filmmaking was one among them. The film faculty consisted of Rajesh Shah and his wife Shalini Shah. Before the end of the year, the duo along with their first batch of 14 students decided to host a tiny student film festival. It was organised by CEFM–The Hermitage, Kumaun University, in association with HIMACEEF.

The second edition, ran for 10 days and included a 5-day FTII film appreciation camp, and featured a Film Critics Circle of India citation.

== Aimed at Creating a Film Culture ==
At the first edition, in April 2017, in addition to the film screenings, open forum sessions and informal masterclasses were conducted by film industry members, including cinematographer Kamaljeet Negi; actor Lalit Mohan Tiwari; Rajeev Katiyar, director of Films Division; film critic/essayist Dalton L, representing the Film Critics Circle of India; and Bhupendra Kainthola, director of FTII-Pune.

At the second edition, in April 2018, FTII conducted an intense 5-day film appreciation camp that was attended by 91 participants—ranging in age from 15-year-old school students to a 72-year-old retired professor—hailing from 10 states, namely, Uttarakhand (Nainital, Dehradun, Haldwani, Khatima, Almora, Kathgodam, Ramnagar and Rudrapur), Uttar Pradesh (Lucknow, Bareilly, Meerut, Ghaziabad, Bijnore, Mathura and Bahedi), Rajasthan (Jaipur, Alwar and Bhilwara), Punjab (Hoshiarpur), Kerala (Kannur), West Bengal (Kolkata), Gujarat (Ahmedabad), Maharashtra (Nagpur), Delhi, and Haryana (Faridabad). The Finance Minister—Govt of Uttarakhand, Shri Prakash Pant, presided over the Valedictory function. Also present were Prof. Sandeep Shahare, National Coordinator, SKIFT (Skilling India in Film and Television) FTII; Course Directors Subhamoy Sengupta and Bela Negi; and FTII director Bhupendra Kaintola, who officially announced that the Institute plans to commence short-term film courses at Kumaun University.

== Awards Conferred ==
- FCCI Award for Best Indian Short Fiction Film at Kautik International Student Film Festival-2018: Orukkam (20:47 mins) | Sankar G, LV Prasad Film & TV Academy–Chennai, India. "For its subtle, sensitive handling of the dual theme of the plight of senior citizens, and of mercy killing." Jury members: Deepa Gahlot, Utpal Datta, and Ratnottama Sengupta
- Kautik Award for the Best Foreign Film: Day 39 (14.43 min) | Jesse Gustafson, Film Division–Columbia University School of the Arts, USA
- Kautik Award for the Best Film: Day 39 (14.43 min) | Jesse Gustafson, Film Division–Columbia University School of the Arts, USA
