= Natoker Moto =

2015 Indian Bengali film

Natoker Moto - Like a Play
- Directed by: Debesh Chattopadhyay
- Written by: Debesh Chattopadhyay
- Produced by: Firdausul Hasan; Probal Haldar
- Starring: Paoli Dam; Roopa Ganguly; Rajatava Dutta; Bratya Basu; Ushasie Chakraborty; Saayoni Ghosh
- Cinematography: Indranil Mukherjee
- Edited by: Bodhaditya Bannerjee
- Music by: Debojyoti Mishra
- Release date: August 2015
- Running time: 121 mins
- Country: India
- Language: Bengali

Natoker Moto - Like a Play (2015) is a Bengali film directed by Debesh Chattopadhyay based on the Life and Struggle of a Legendary Actress of Calcutta which still impresses the Theatre Movement of India.

== Synopsis ==
This film is about the journey of Kheya, a theatre artist and her multi-dimensional experience as a girl, a woman and an artist. It is a story on a woman's maverick capability and of excellence beyond her time. While the film depicts the scenario of Kolkata's socio-cultural circuit spanning from 1950 to 1970s, it aspires to bring about the struggles and conflicts that a female artist has to go through even after two decades of globalization. The film, through an investigation of the sudden demise of an extremely reputed actress delves into an ongoing search behind the causes of ceaseless conflicts a female artist has to confront and is made to remain submissive in the paradigm of male domination. The film intends to get into precise details of the artist's life so as to expose the obstructions, understand the strength of creative aspirations, and to ablaze with the delightful journey of the artistic soul that unfortunately got cut short. However, this film is envisaged to be in coherence with the belief in the unending journey of the artist who still remains alive with the lively river and the living art.

== Awards ==
FCCI Award for Best Debut Director (Natoker Moto) at HBFF-2016 Citation: “For the sensitive cinematic portrayal of the struggle of a dedicated artistic soul in a powerful visual odyssey that reinforces cinema, theater and lived life.” Jury members: Siladitya Sen, Madhu Eravankara, and Dalton L

== Cast ==
- Paoli Dam as Kheya
- Roopa Ganguly as Kheya's Mother
- Rajatava Dutta as The Investigating Officer
- Saswata Chatterjee as Prasad
- Bratya Basu as Amitesh
- Sujan Mukherjee as Manoranjan
- Ushasie Chakraborty as Sabita Sinha
- Saayoni Ghosh as Kheya's Friend
- Bhashkar Bannerjee

== See also ==
- Film Critics Circle of India
- Hyderabad Bengali Film Festival
