= Gaṇikā =

Courtesan in Ancient India

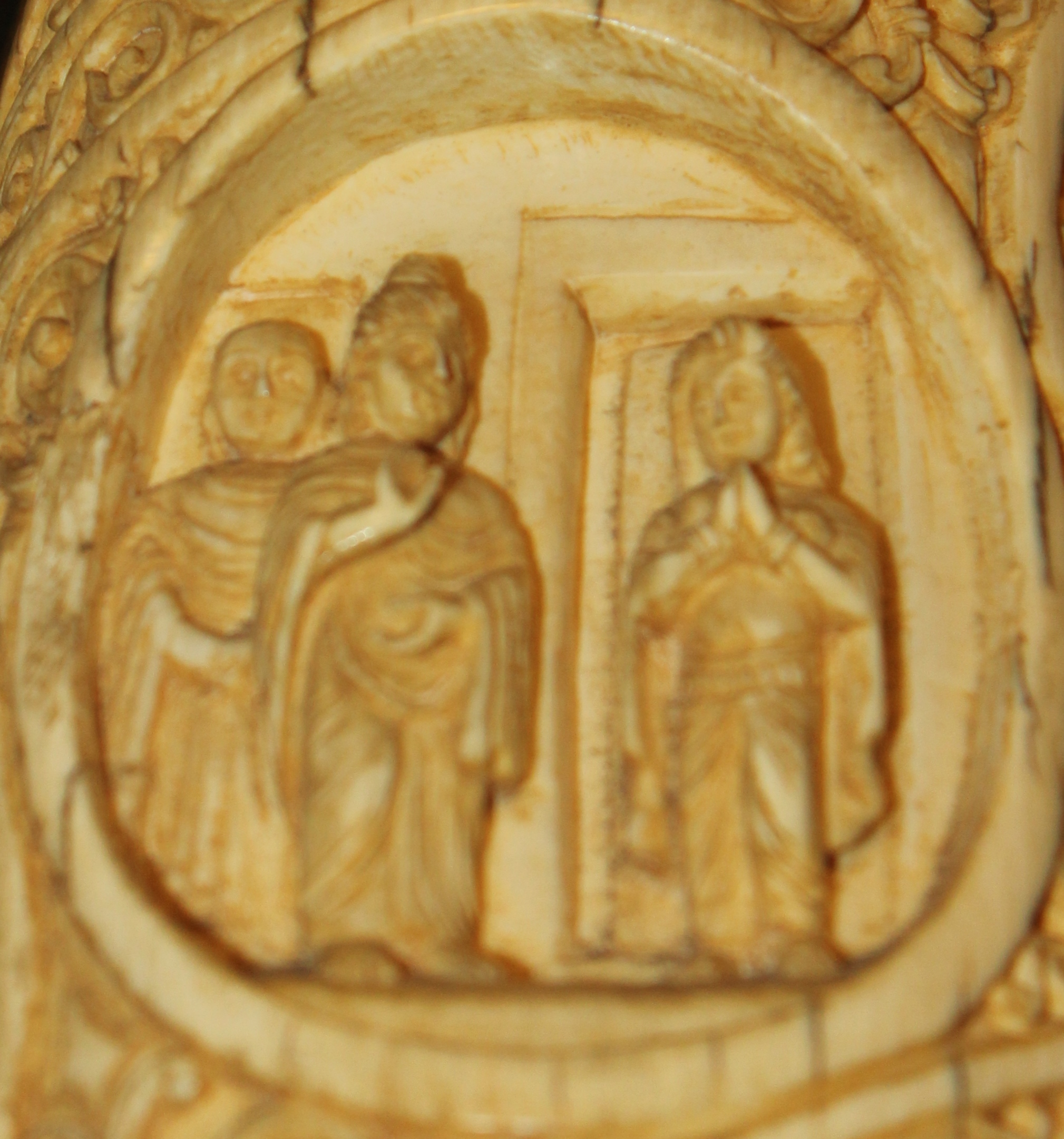
"Amrapali greets Buddha", an ivory carving of the royal courtesan Amrapali of the Mulasarvastivada

Gaṇikā (Devanagari: गणिका) is the Sanskrit term for a courtesan in Ancient India, with earliest reference in the Vedic period. In the Kamasutra, ganikas are dubbed "courtesans de luxe", distinguishing them from other prostitutes such as vesyas. According to Indian historian Moti Chandra, gaṇikā occupied the highest place in the hierarchy of courtesans.

According to the Kamasutra, to become recognized as a ganika, a woman had to master the sixty-four arts of Kalā, which include musical, performing, visual arts, writing, architecture, clairvoyance, and chemistry. After earning the title of ganika, she was revered as the most virtuous, beautiful, and luxurious of all courtesans. She would use these arts to entertain rulers, princes, and other wealthy patrons on religious and social occasions.

== Terminology ==
Gaṇikā refers more to a courtesan who is cultured, educated, and skilled in the arts, distinct from a prostitute. Indian tradition has categorized and clearly distinguished between the two. Nagarvadhu was a royal courtesan, known as the "bride of the city", chosen only by the most beautiful and most skilled courtesan in dance. Rajnartaki refers to a female court dancer. Roopjiva or Roopajeeva refers to a woman who performs for the general public; she is a courtesan and an actress. Devadasi are dancers and musicians dedicated to temples, who care for the temples and perform during ceremonies. Vesya refers to a prostitute who engages in prostitution in society. Rupajiva refers to a prostitute who provides sexual services to the military.

Due to many historical interpretations, the original meaning of the term ganika has become obscured, and is thus subjective. The mid-20th-century Indologist Ludwik Sternbach extensively researched and detailed courtesans mentioned in all Sanskrit literature; however, he does not clearly distinguish between different types of courtesans, or at least between veshyas and ganikas. This is possibly due to the difficulty of translating Sanskrit, as well as the lack of information to really differentiate the two.

== Religious contexts ==
Gaṇikās are mentioned in Sanskrit literature in the context of Hinduism, which focuses on the puruṣārthass (four goals of human life), as well as in texts of Buddhism and Jainism.

=== Hinduism ===
==== Kamasutra ====
Vātsyāyana dedicated Book Six of the Kamasutra to discussing courtesans. Below are the following chapters in which they appear:

Book Six: Courtesans
Chapter	Title	Page numbers
1	Deciding on a Friend, Eligible Lover and Ineligible Lover, and How to Get a Lover	pp. 131–136
2	How to Give a Beloved What He Wants	pp. 137–142
3	Ways to Get Money from A Man, Signs That His Passion is Dying and How to Get Rid of Him	pp. 142–147
4	How to Get Back Together with an Ex-lover	pp. 147–151
5	How to Weight Different Kinds of Profits	pp. 151–155
6	Ways to Calculate Gains, Losses, Consequences and Doubts, and Types of Courtesans	pp. 155–160

In the final chapter of Book Six, ganikas are specifically mentioned in a list, "The servant woman who carries water, the servant girl, the promiscuous woman, the loose woman, the dancer, the artist, the openly ruined woman, the woman who lives on her beauty, and the courtesan de luxe: those are the types of courtesans." However, when a ganika lives with her lover, she maintains the relationship like a wife.

==== Dharmasastra ====
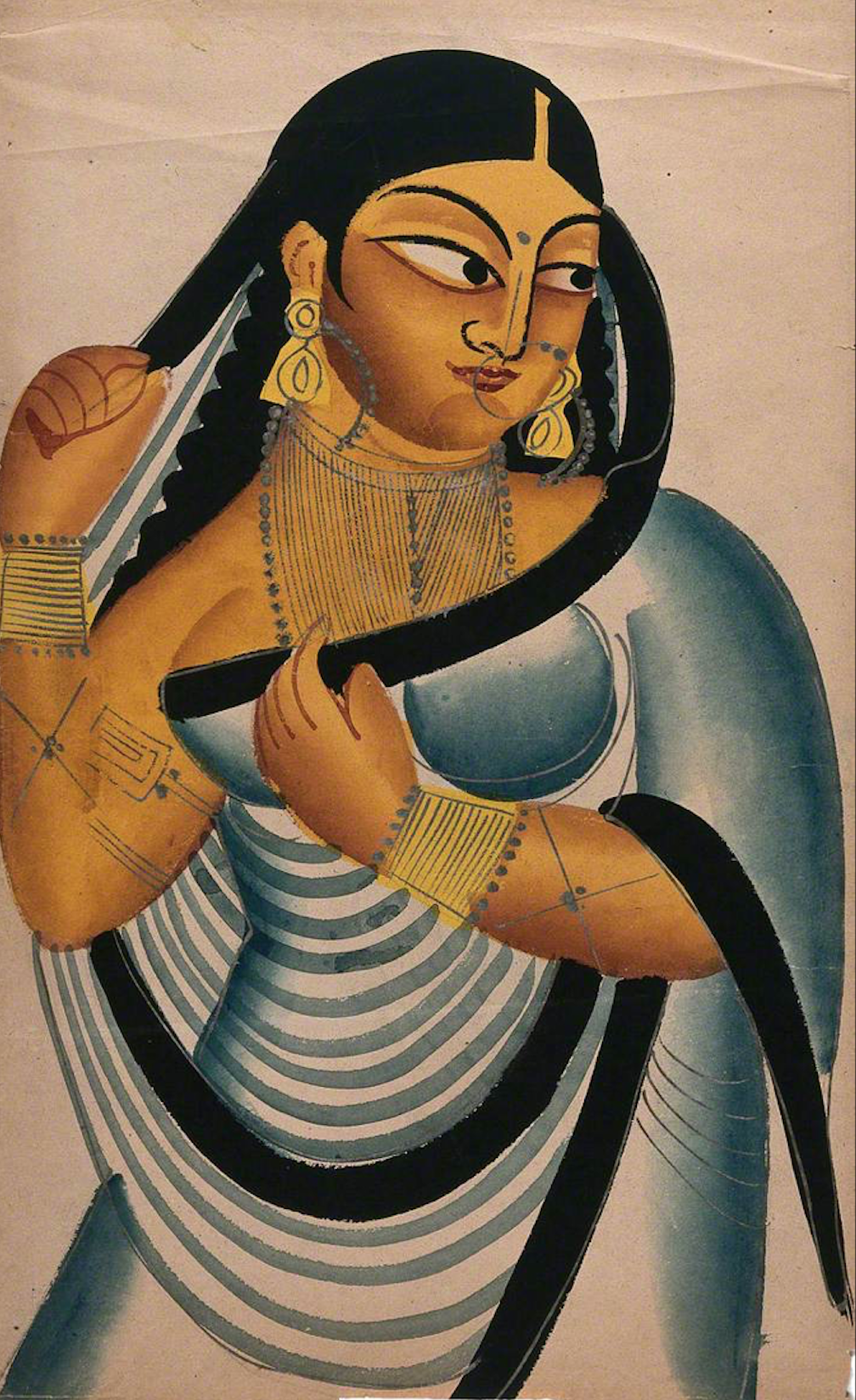
Painting of a courtesan in the midst of unveiling herself

Written by Yajñavalkya, the Dharmasastra is a compilation or handbook focused on the laws and conducts which govern individuals' social and ethical behaviour in society. However, unlike the other texts, as far as we know, the Dharmasastra sheds light on the differences between the classes of courtesans and more or less has divided them into distinctive groups, such as:

1. Vesyas, public women who openly entertain people and do not earn a lot of income
2. Dasi (slave women) and Savarini (fallen women), who can be taken as concubines and live in a man's house
3. Gaṇikās, courtesans who are handsomely paid for their skills

==== Arthasastra ====
Chanakya, also known as Kautilya, devoted a chapter in Book II of the Arthasastra to discuss the duties of gaṇikādhyaka—the supreme courtesan and a supervisor who enforces the rules regarding courtesans. It was vitally important for shastras (manuals) to discuss gaṇikās, because gaṇikās were not for sexual pleasure but were state-recognised and appointed institutionalised positions of the court in the Gupta Empire.

According to Kautilya, gaṇikās earned around 1,000 Karshapana and their duties mostly consisted of attending to the king's every need, such as fanning him or fetching water for him. Should the king wish her to entertain men, she must do so; if not, this would result in a punishment of either whips or a heavy fine. Furthermore, gaṇikās earned part of their income from taxpayers or the king's treasury.

The presence of gaṇikās in the Arthasastra suggests that, although courtesans were highly prized and well compensated, they were restricted to specific duties and could not freely pursue their own paths. All trade and transactions were strictly regulated.Although ganikas were respected in the past, women were not allowed to be both entertainers and housewives at the same time; women with public lives were considered "baazaru of the market". Even if she remained a performer, she did not engage in prostitution.

==== Āgamas ====
Leslie Orr, a scholar of the religious and social history of medieval Tamil Nadu and of women in pre-colonial South Asia, opened new possibilities for understanding how gaṇikās may have been involved in these texts. She studied and collected several passages and Sanskrit texts that indicate women were involved in temple work.

Rudrakanyas or Rudraganikas, meaning "daughters of Rudra" or "the female ganas of Rudra", were an ancient female religious order related to Shaivism that included formal spiritual initiation (diksha) and were at the high end of the religious hierarchy of temples. The confusion of their names with the generic term gaṇikā, which came to colloquially refer to courtesans, led to their persecution during colonial times.

The Buddhist text Therīgāthā illuminates another potential identity for these women. It includes poems of nuns who were previously courtesans, suggesting that women did leave courtesan professions to become renunciates. Meill describes them as women "whose life circumstances and longings lead them onto a path away from the secular world toward freedom and enlightenment."

==== Kavyamimamsa ====
This work and compilation by the Sanskrit poet Rajashekhara suggests that ganikas and princesses were excellent poets. Both mastered the 64 arts of Kala, distinguishing them from vesyas and non-courtesans. Contrary to the stereotypical and contemporary view of courtesans, this suggests that ganikas were more refined and skilled in many arts, not just sex.

==== Nāṭyaśāstra ====
Bharata's Nāṭyaśāstra is a second-century BCE work in which gaṇikās are described as heroes or idealized women. They "should have the qualities of light-heartedness, exaltedness and expertise in dance, music and other arts." This idealized view of a gaṇikā's skills in the theatrics was circulated throughout ancient India. This resulted in courtesans being the stars of many Sanskrit plays, such as Meghadūta, The Farce of the Pious Courtesan, King Vikramaditya and the Courtesan, and The Ocean of Story.

==== Mṛcchakaṭikam ====
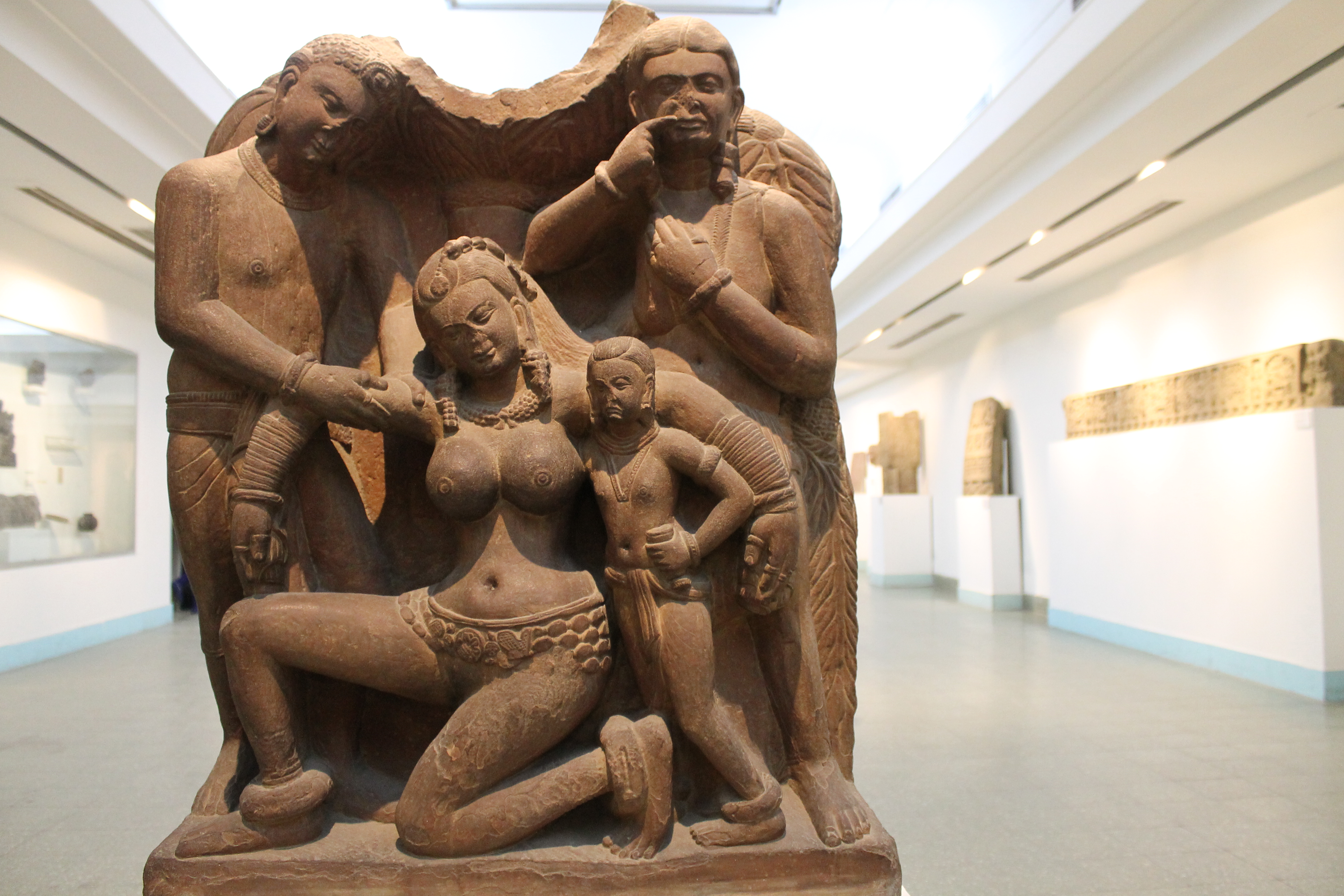
Vasantsena in her courtesan house, possibly one of the early art representations of courtesans during Gupta period.

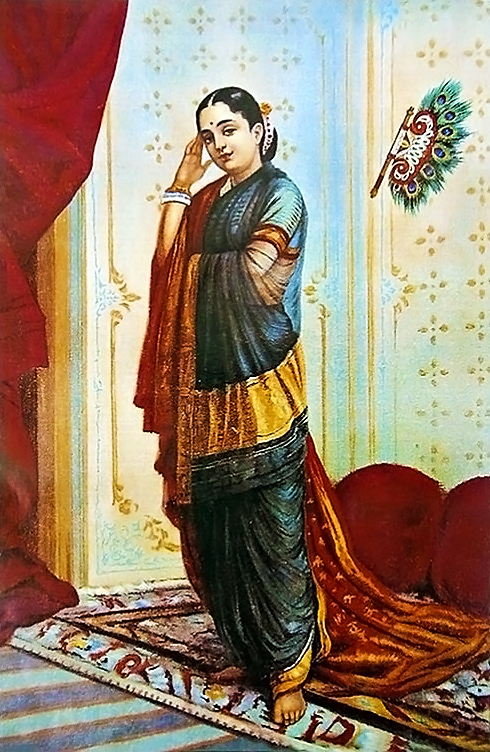
Vasanthansena, famous for her role as a courtesan in Sanskrit play Mṛcchakaṭika (The Little Clay Cart)

The Mṛcchakaṭikam, also known as The Little Clay Cart, is a famous Sanskrit play written by Śūdraka, possibly in the 5th century CE. In this play, the youthful, rich, famous courtesan known as Vasantasenā is pursued by Cārudatta, a married man and a father.Her role as a gaṇikā is dramatized and introduced into a medium different than traditional treatises. Additionally, there is a narrative aim to turn the gaṇikā into a kulavadhü (wife); this transformation is further complicated by Cārudatta's son refusing to acknowledge Vasantasenā because she didn't wear his mother's jewelry.

In this play, gaṇikās are not simply courtesans and are restricted to this role after taking it. Yet Vasantasenā shifts roles, from courtesan to wife, and takes on the role of stepmother. This nuanced portrayal of a gaṇikā is interesting because treatises had so far only identified the roles of gaṇikās within patriarchal society. Also, as scholar Shalini Shah states, Vasantasenā herself goes through a psychological and symbolical change because she forsakes her jewels (and therefore her pride as a courtesan) to Cārudatta's son, by placing them in his toy clay cart, hence the name.

=== Buddhism ===
==== Jātaka ====
The Jataka tales are Indian stories about the births and rebirths of the Buddha. However, scholars such as Monika Saxena argue that gaṇikās appear in the texts under terms such as nagarasobhani (town beauty) or nagaramandana (ornament of the city), and that, like the necklaces and earrings they wear, gaṇikās helped beautify the world.

Citizens of the Gupta period were proud of gaṇikās for their mastery of arts, and many women who followed the path of a courtesan emulated the gaṇikā as the "ideal". Although the Jatakas focused on the Buddha, these texts make numerous references to the types of beautiful women and their skills, as these were important to royals.

==== Mulasarvastivada ====
The Mulasarvastivada is an early text that highlights and offers insight into the reasons for the prestige of gaṇikās. The word gaṇikā derives from the term gana, meaning 'to be in a group' and 'to associate with', and the feminine suffix 'ika'. The text further highlights this through a narrative of Amrapali who tried to understand how gana works in gaṇikā.

Amrapali is famous because she was more than just a gaṇikā—she is celebrated and given the title of nagarvadhu (royal courtesan). This was because during an assembly of nobles, princes, and the King, they all decided that she was too good of a woman to belong to one man, and so she earned the title Striratna (jewel of woman), basically suggesting that she was the crème de la crème and that she was to be enjoyed by the gana.

=== Jainism ===
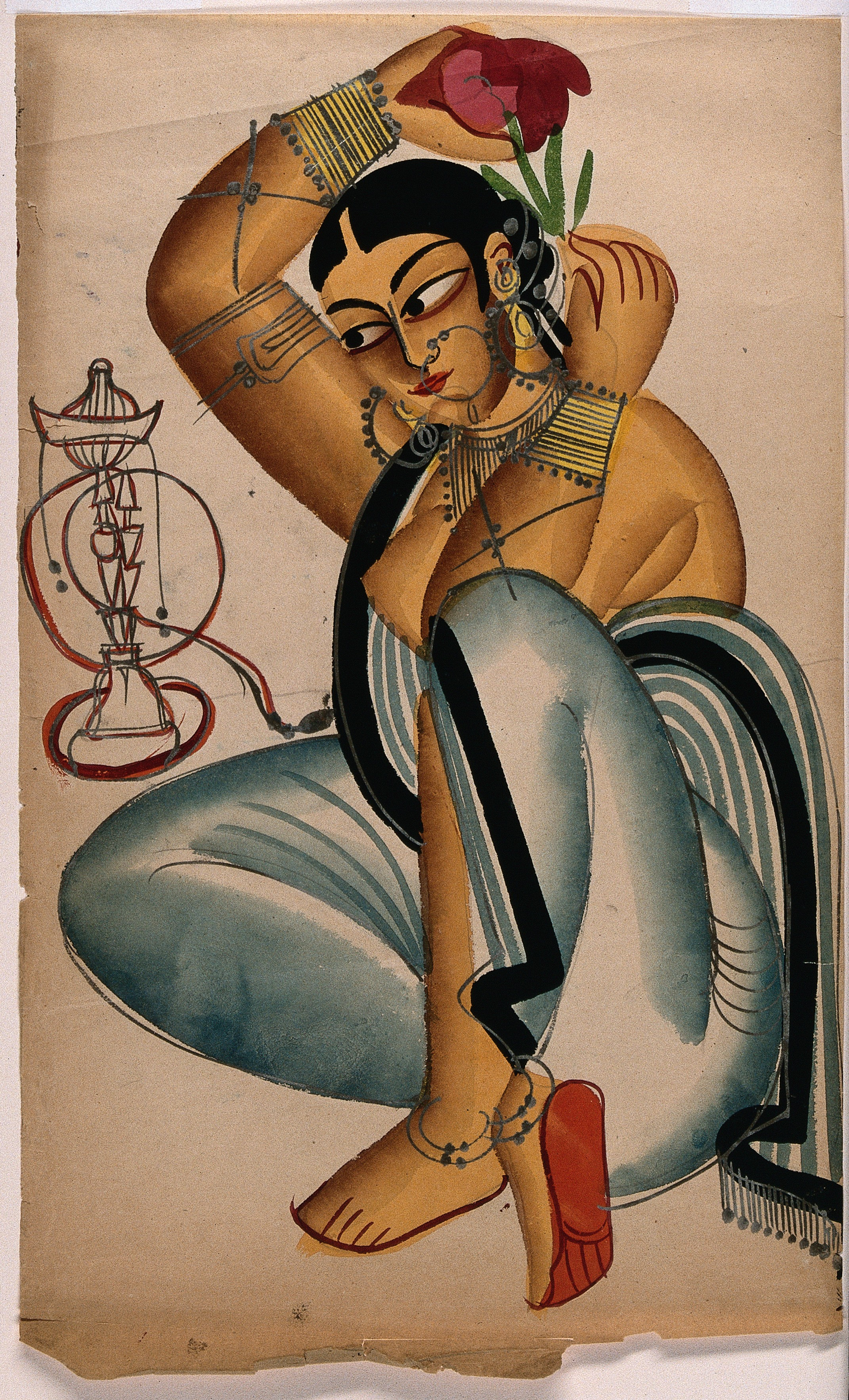
Painting of a courtesan arranging a flower in her hair to beautify herself

In the Jain literature, ganikas are well known and are extremely respected by the kings. They are known as 'the jewel of the city' and almost every large city had its own ganika. Similar to the texts in Hinduism, ganikas are paid handsomely for their skills, which distinguish them from veshyas. Both ganikas and veshyas are women who are open to all members of gana, and accessible to men for a fee. In a sense, ganikas are valued based on how much they charge. Whilst veshyas also sell their physical charms, they remain unmastered in cultural and intellectual skills.

== History ==
=== Gupta Period ===
==== Social ====
Ganikas were mostly famous during the Gupta Empire, a golden age during which ideas of the court and courtliness, as well as the position of courtesan, were established. They also existed around the time of the earlier Mauryan Empire.

So far there has been no recording of the first ganika in any source or scholarly work. Their rich history is based on Sanskrit texts that have been translated and studied by scholars. A ganika is clearly recognized for her professionalism and identity in the working class, but her standing in the working class is unknown and unclear. She was also vital to the state and remunerated for her services to the king. The scholar Nitin Bora suggested that a ganika social position could vary widely, from being lower than a doorkeeper to being the most powerful person in the state or city.

Even within the courtesan profession there were hierarchies and categories. Not only were ganikas part of the category of courtesans, they also had their own subsets: uttama, Madhyama, and Kanishta. These three were segregated based on their physical attributes and working skills, as this made it easier to properly renumerate them. Since the basis for earning the title of ganika was mastery of the 64 arts, ganikas were further segregated based on their skill level in singing, dancing, and playing musical instruments.

==== Economic ====
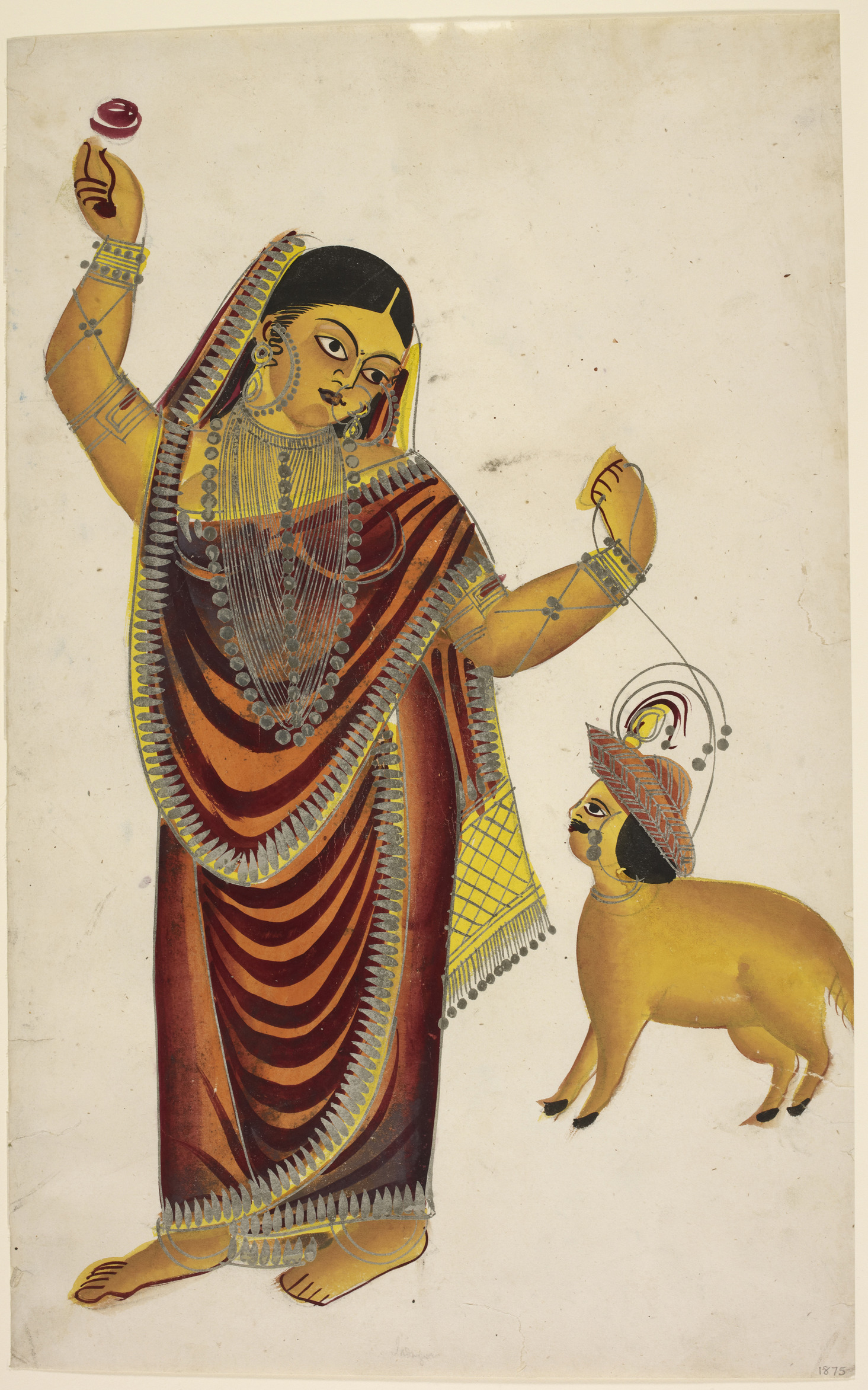
A courtesan leading a sheep with a human head, symbolic of woman leading the man or satire on female domination over men

From the ganika's point of view, the sole motive for joining her profession was pecuniary gain. The term used and discussed at length in Kuttanimatta is ratishilpa. Thus, it was skill, not just beauty and charm, which enabled her to secure her means of livelihood. One might say that the body was treated as a legitimate tradeable commodity.

— Monika Saxena, Associate Professor in History of University of Delhi (2023)

While gaṇikās certainly had more autonomy than a typical housewife, ancient texts like the Arthashāstra show that they were not entirely "free". They were heavily regulated by the state, had to pay 2/15th of their earnings as tax, and had to report their income to a government official. Their chief objective above all else was monetary gain, and as such their clients were mostly (or rather, had to be) wealthy and generous. However, at the same time, ganikas must not let a client know that pleasuring him was for material gain, as this may have disillusioned him or bruised his ego. How much a ganika should charge was based on several factors, such as her social status (her lineage and her family standing), the quality of her establishment (in both the business reputation and the neighborhood), regional customs, time of the year, habits of her clients, her worth, and her cultural accomplishments in relation to her competitors (other local courtesans).

Ganikas were prided not just as cultural entities but also cultural benefactors, who, when having sufficient money, instead of spending the money to ornament and beautify themselves further, would spend it on expanding their influence through the erection of temples, gardens, or bridges. This further increased their social value, because they were giving back to the community, as much as they were taking from the men.

==== Cultural ====
According to the Kāmasūtra, a courtesan who mastered the 64 arts earned the title of ganika—a courtesan of high quality—and was held in esteem by kings and learned men alike.

The ganikas were generally more educated and better skilled in the arts than the married women, and the nagarakas, though they had devoted wives at home, as the ideal of a waife drawn by Vatsyayana shows, were attracted by the intellectual and artistic qualities of the educated ganika.

— Priya Darshini, in "Status of the Gaṇikās in the Gupta Period: Change or Continuity?" (2003)

Ganika contributed to the culture refinement of Ancient India. They participated in festivals and plays, performed music and dance, and learned singing, chanting, dancing, acting, calligraphy, and painting. They played musical instruments such as the veena, venu, and mridangam.

== Early Indian art ==
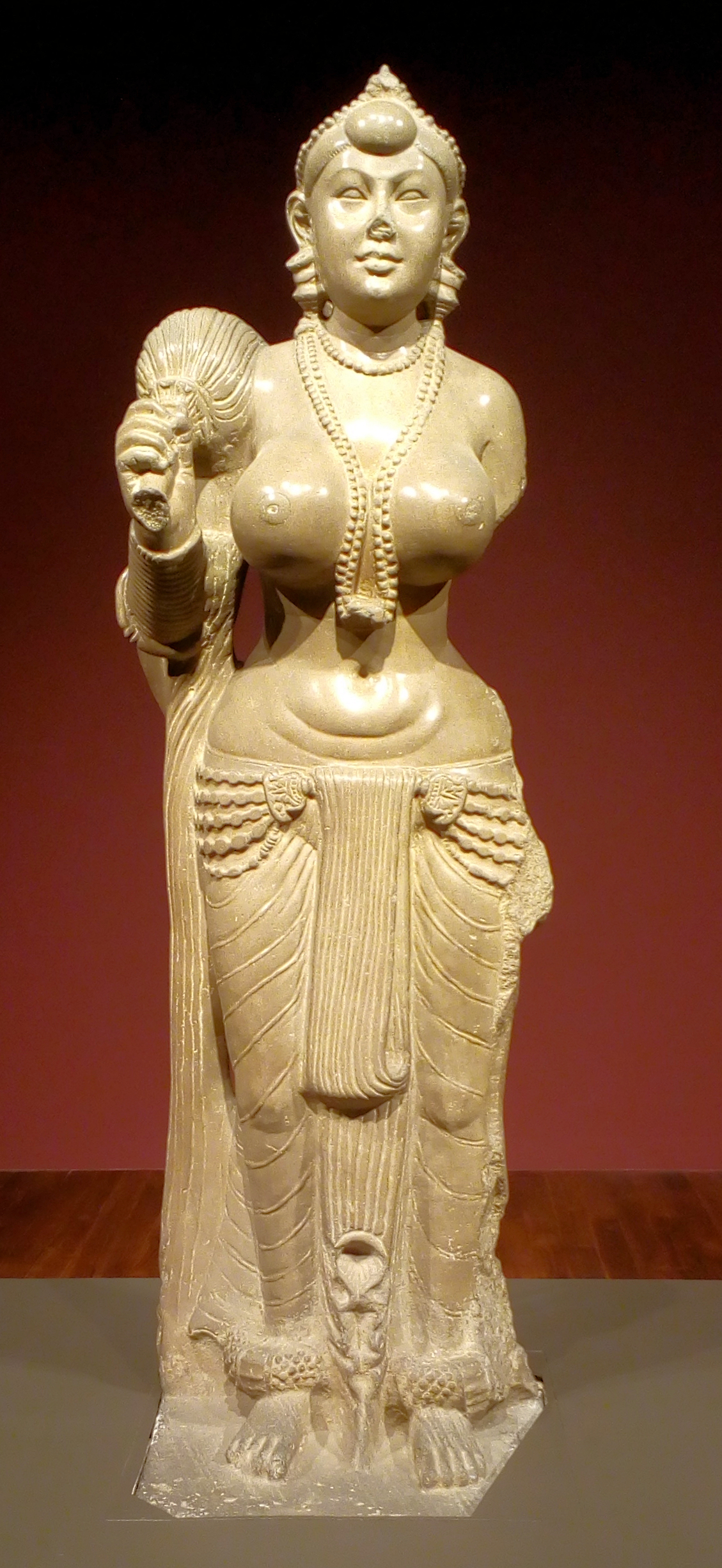
The Didarganj Yakshi statue, possibly an early art depiction of a ganika

A possibly early depiction of a ganika is the ancient Pataliputra sculpture known as the Didarganj Yakshi statue. As Doris Meth Srinivasan, a historian of Indological studies and writer, suggests:

I propose that an ancient Pataliputra sculpture represents an image of a royal Ganika. A beauteous female image, carved in the environs of the Mauryan capital, is imbued with the characteristics that mark her as a Ganika, possibly the chief Ganika or the pratiganika, attached to the imperial court.

— Doris Meth Srinivasan, historian of Indological studies

Although the statue was found in 1917 in Didarganj, India, the subject's identity is still being investigated. The statue's name was given only because her "typical" traits—Yakshi being a name for a fertility figure—as the statue has the characteristic large breasts, curved hips, and a thin waist. Although the statue matches in terms of figure, the most important accessory that may deviate her from being a Yakshi is her hand fan. Srinivasan and art historians Frederick Asher and Walter Spink suggest that her hand fan is a key accessory for courtesans.

The hand fan is a quite common accessory for courtesans in other cultures. For example, the 18th-century Japanese hanging scroll painting "Courtesan with Fan and Koto" (late 18th century) by Chōbunsai Eishi (鳥文斎栄之), or the Chinese painting "Courtesans with fan and flute" (17th–18th century) possibly by Zhang Gui. Despite a vast difference in time period, this shows how courtesans and fans go hand-in-hand. Furthermore, since fanning the king was a duty of gaṇikā attendants, a hand fan would be natural accessory for a courtesan.

Other attributes also suggest that the statue represents a gaṇikā:

The presence of the fly whisk, the reason for the slight bow, the general stylistic similarity with other pieces produced by royal ateliers in Pataliputra, the size of the figure, perhaps even the small tiara on the head, to say nothing of her exceptional beauty, all these become signposts designating the gaṇikā.

— Doris Meth Srinivasan, historian of Indological studies.

== Famous courtesans ==
- Amrapali
- Purasati – ganika and poet who achieved her accomplishments through the practice of Vajra Tikshana. She is considered one of the teachers of the philosopher Nagarjuna.
- Barani – ganika and poet who was a daughter of the commoner Rahuta and Joyful Dhari. Kashmiri scholar Brilliance also consulted her on academic matters.
- Buta – a Durga temple built in the 7th century refers to ganika called Buta
- Anukkiyara Paravai Nankiyara – dancer in the Chola empire who donated gold, copper, and jewels to the shrine of Tiruvarura, in the 10th century
- Vithanayakaci Nayaki – one of the 200 donors to the Vithoba Temple in the 13th century
- Panditaci Nayaki Hira – one of the 200 donors to the Vithoba Temple in the 13th century
- Nandavva – Ganga King Simhavarman's concubine
- Paliyakka – Vikrama Santaras's concubine
- Camekamba – Amma II of the Eastern Chalukyas's concubine
- Sirima – ganika who, through her Buddhist faith and offerings to monks, entered the palace of Indra. After her death, her image was carved on a stupa, becoming an idol and gaining acceptance from mainstream society.
- Vasantmalini – court dancer of King Dheersingh of Kanchanadesh

== Popular culture ==
Although the term ganika is not very well known (unlike tawaif, who have been in numerous Bollywood films), ganika may have appeared in:

=== In films ===
- Raj Nartaki (1941)
- Chitralekha (1964)
- Amrapali (1966)
- Utsav (1984)

=== In Sanskrit plays and dramas ===
- Bhagavadajjukam
- Mṛcchakatika
- Madhavi (Silappatikaram)

== Bibliography ==
- "The Ganika in Buddhist and Jaina literature". INDIAN CULTURE.
- "The Kama Sutra of Vatsyayana: Part I: Introductory: Chapter III. On the Study of the Sixty-Four Arts". sacred-texts.com.
- "Leslie Orr - Concordia University". www.concordia.ca.
- "Ganika, Gaṇika, Gaṇikā: 28 definitions". www.wisdomlib.org. 3 August 2014.
- "Chōbunsai Eishi 鳥文斎栄之 | Courtesan with Fan and Koto | Japan | Edo period (1615–1868)". The Metropolitan Museum of Art.
- "Courtesans with fan and flute". National Museum of Asian Art.
- Basham, A. L.; Sharma, Arvind (1994). The little clay cart: an English translation of the Mṛcchakaṭika of Śūdraka, as adapted for the stage. Albany: State University of New York Press. ISBN 0791417255.
- Chandra, Moti (1973). The World Of Courtesans. Hindi Pocket Book.
- Chatterjee, Gayatri (January 2008). "Chapter 20: The veshya, the ganika and the tawaif: Representations of prostitutes and courtesans in Indian language, literature and cinema". In Sahni, Rohini (ed.). Prostitution and Beyond: An Analysis of Sex Work in India. SAGE Publications. pp. 279–300.
- Dange, Sindhu S. (1990). The institutions of Ganika and Devadasi from ancient to medieval times. New Delhi: Sangeet Natak Akademi.
- Darshini, Priya (2003). "Status of The Ganikas in the Gupta Period: Change or Continuity?". Proceedings of the Indian History Congress. 64: 167–172. JSTOR 44145457.
- Jaiswal, Suvira (2001). "Female Images in the Arthasastra of Kautilya". Social Scientist. 29 (3/4): 51–59. doi:10.2307/3518338. ISSN 0970-0293. JSTOR 3518338.
- Orr, Leslie (1993). Hindu Temple Women of the Chola Period in South India (PhD thesis). McGill University. p. 1-634.
- Meill, Kyung (2020). Diversity in the Women of the Therīgāthā (Mindfulness Studies Theses thesis). Lesley University. p. 1-74.
- Saxena, Monika (2006). "Ganikas in Early India: Its Genesis and Dimensions". Social Scientist. 34 (11/12): 2–17. ISSN 0970-0293. JSTOR 27644180.
- Saxena, Monika (December 2023). "Facets of Economic and Cultural Life of a Courtesan in Ancient India". Studies in People's History. 10 (2): 143–160. doi:10.1177/23484489231198557.
- Shah, Shalini (April 2002). "In the Business of Kāma: Prostitution in Classical Sanskrit Literature from the Seventh to the Thirteenth Centuries". The Medieval History Journal. 5 (1): 121–156. doi:10.1177/097194580200500106. ISSN 0971-9458.
- Srinivasan, Doris Meth (2005). "The Mauryan Gaṇikā from Dīdārgañj (Pāṭaliputra)". East and West. 55 (1/4): 345–362. ISSN 0012-8376. JSTOR 29757653.
- Sternbach, Ludwik (1953). Ganika-vrtta-sangrahah: or Texts on courtezans in classical Sanskrit. Compiled and presented by Ludwik Sternbach. Vishveshvaranand Vedic Research Institute.
- Rajasekhara (1934). Dalal, C. D.; Sastry, R. A. (eds.). Kāvyamīmāṃsā of Rājaśekhara. Oriental Institute.
- Vatsyayana, Mallanaga (2009). Doniger, Wendy; Kakar, Sudhir (eds.). Kamasutra. A new, complete English translation of the Sanskrit text with excerpts from the Sanskrit Jayamangala commentary of Yashodhara Indrapada, the Hindi Jaya commentary of Devadatta Shastri, and explanatory notes by the translators. Oxford University Press.
