= Film Critics Circle of India =

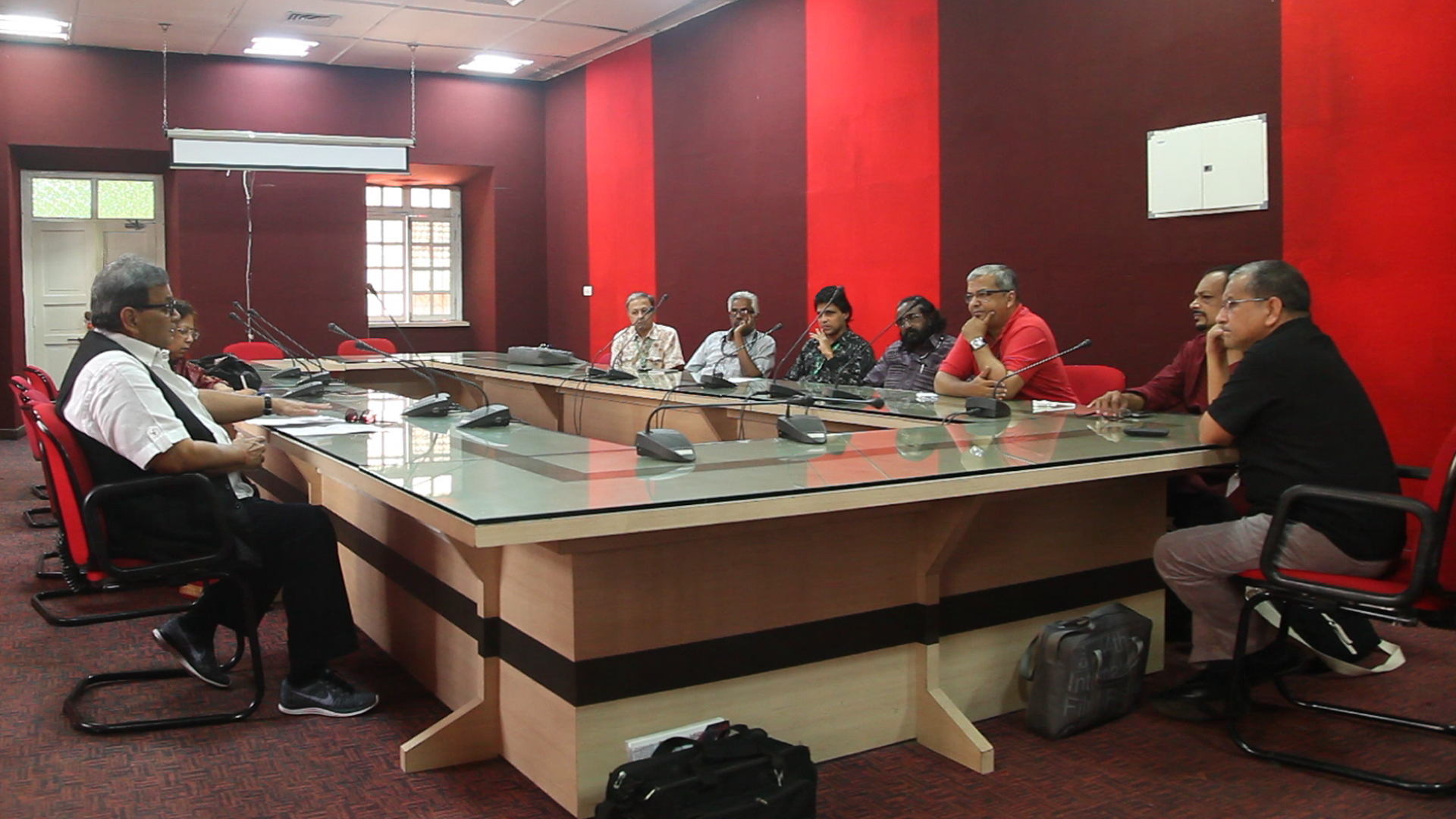
L–R: Subhash Ghai, Ratnottama Sengupta, Utpal Borpujari, C. S. Venkiteswaran, Dalton, V. K. Joseph, Saibal Chatterjee, Madhu Eravankara, and Utpal Datta. 'Film Critics Circle of India' AGM, IFFI—2013.

Film Critics Circle of India (FCCI) is a society comprising notable film critics from all the major film producing states of India.

At the AGM, conducted at the International Film Festival of India—2013, Subhash Ghai said, "You are in a highly responsible profession. You have the responsibility to look into the growth of civilization and of the next generation. We filmmakers look upon you as God. So guide us in your reviews, tell us where we lack, and how we can improve. But do not mock us. Creative people are extra sensitive, so talk like a mother, not like an opponent."

== Awards ==
=== FCCI Award for Best Indian Film of the Year ===
- FCCI Award for the Best Indian Film of 2019 Super Deluxe (film)(directed by Thiagarajan Kumararaja)
- FCCI Award for the Best Indian Film of 2018: Ee.Ma.Yau. (directed by Lijo Jose Pellissery)
- FCCI Award for the Best Indian Film of 2017: Village Rockstars (directed by Rima Das)
- FCCI Award for the Best Indian Film of 2016: Thithi (directed by Raam Reddy)
- FCCI Award for the Best Indian Film of 2015: Court (2014 film) (directed by Chaitanya Tamhane)

=== FCCI awards at film festivals ===
- FCCI Award for Best Debut Film at Toulouse Indian Film Festival: Pariyerum Perumal by Mari Selvaraj
- FCCI Award for Best Indian Short Fiction Film at Kautik International Student Film Festival-2018: Orukkam. "For its subtle, sensitive handling of the dual theme of the plight of senior citizens, and of mercy killing."
- Critics Award for Best Short Fiction at SASFF-2018: Statement After My Poet Husband's Death/ Bangladesh/ Bengali/ 2016/15M/ Dir. Tasmiah Afrin Mou.
- Critics Award for Best Documentary at SASFF-2018: Liquid Borders/ India/ English/ 2015/ 40M/ Dir. Barnali Ray Shukla.
- FCCI Award for Best Indian Film at ALIIFF-2016: The Violin Player (directed by Bauddhayan Mukherji).“For the sensitive portrayal of conflict between the artistic vision of ideal life and harsh realities of the contemporary city life, depicted in an innovative and minimalistic style.”
- FCCI Award for Best Debut Director at HBFF-2016: Debesh Chattopadhyay (Natoker Moto). “For the sensitive cinematic portrayal of the struggle of a dedicated artistic soul in a powerful visual odyssey that reinforces cinema, theater and lived life.”
- FCCI Special Mention Award at HBFF-2016: Cinemawala (directed by Kaushik Ganguly). “For directing the spotlight on the grave crisis engulfing the celluloid art with the inevitable march of technology.”

== Journal of Indian Cinema ==
In January 2019, a monthly journal was launched.

== Other important film critics societies in India ==
- Indian body of FIPRESCI
- Indian Film Critics Association

== Other important film bodies in India ==
- Federation of Film Societies of India
- Film Federation of India

== See also ==
- International Film Festival of India (IFFI)
- International Film Festival of Kerala (IFFK)
- Hyderabad Bengali Film Festival
- Kautik International Student Film Festival
- Toulouse Indian Film Festival
