= Debesh Chattopadhyay =

Indian actor, film and theatre director

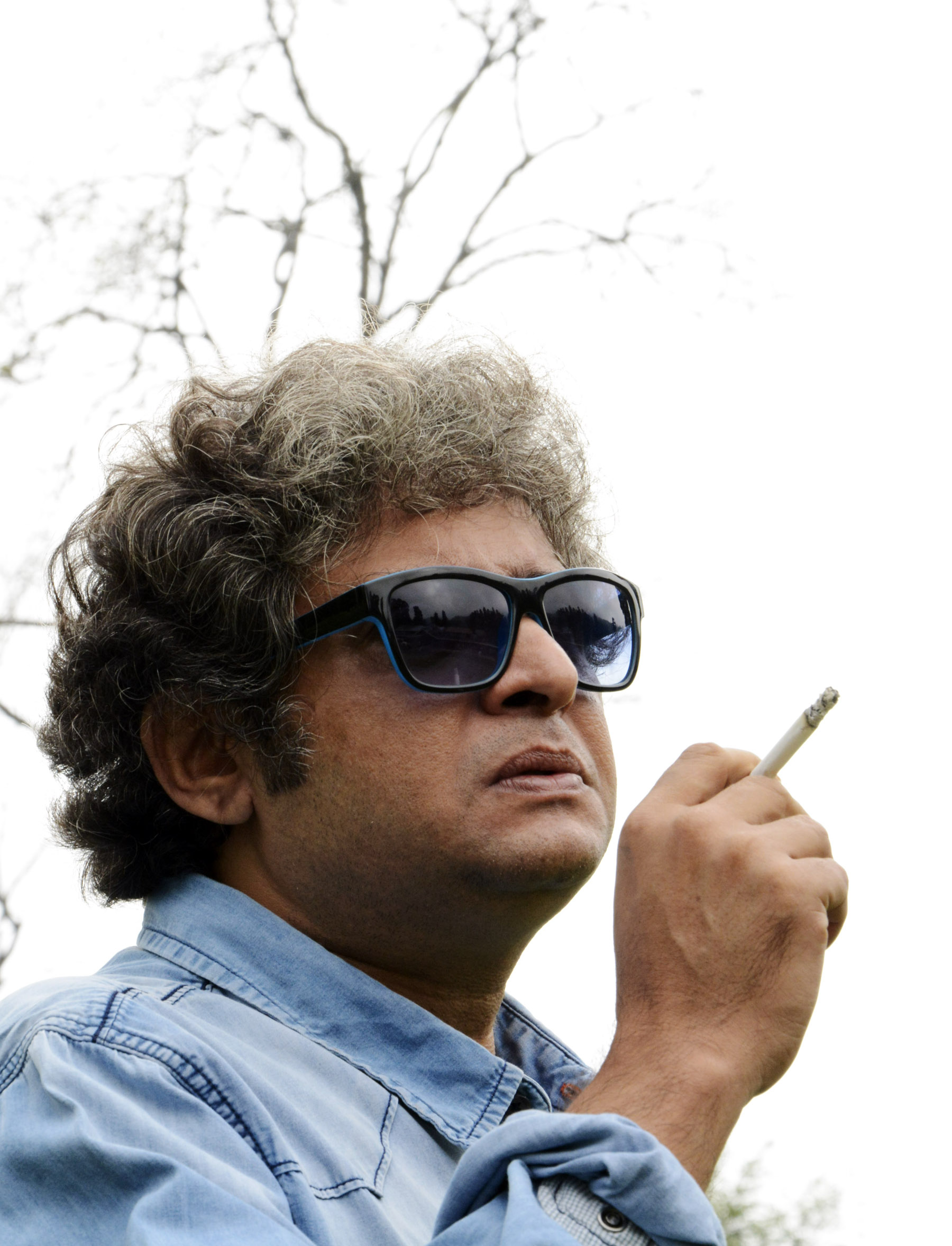
- Chattopadhyay in 2014
- Occupations: Actor, theatre and film director

Debesh Chattopadhyay (also Chatterjee) is an Indian Bengali film & theatre director and actor. He has also acted in a few Bengali films.

== Career ==
Chattopadhyay is associated with theatre since 1984. At that time he was 18 years old. In 1989 he joined Bengali theatre group Shilpayan and became a full-time theatre artist. In 1992 he joined theatre group Ganakrishti and acted in the play Manyobor Bhool Korchen. He also worked in the theatre group Theatron. Sansriti.

=== As a documentary film maker ===
Documentary film on ‘Satu Sen’ which is financed by the National School of Drama, Delhi. Documentary film ‘Dreams Unlimited’ on ‘Natyamela 2008’ produced by Paschim Banga Natya Academy. Documentary film on ‘Rangakarmi -A Journey’ based on the activities and contribution of the theatre group ‘RANGAKARMI’ (Director- Usha Ganguly). Documentary film on ‘Habib Tanvir’ produced by Paschim Banga Natya Academy.

== As a film maker ==
Natoker Moto - Like a Play (Based on the life and career of the deceased actress Keya Chakraborty) IYE - The Others (Inspired by Peter Bischel's Kindergarten Stories)

=== As a theatre workshop instructor ===
Physically and mentally challenged children of SANCHAR, BIKRAMSHILA (NGO). Theatre workers of different theatre groups of West Bengal. School children (St. Augustine’s, South Point, Kolkata). Minerva Natyasanskriti Charchakendra for repertoire. Paschim Banga Natya Academy, Theatrical Workshop (Residential), at Kaliagange, Uttar Dinajpur.

=== As a theatre seminar speaker ===
Seminars organised by N S D, Paschimbanga Natya Academy, Nandipat, Rangakala, Sayak, Rangroop, Abhinayan, Rupantar, Ajitesh Natya Academy, Natya Srijoni, Natyasodh, Kathakriti, Prachya etc.

=== As a visiting lecturer ===
Indian Institute Of Science, Bangalore on ‘ Neuroscience & Theatre’ in 2009. Wigan & Leigh College India on ‘Acting’ for Design Faculty in 2008. Govt. College, Bashirhat on ‘Absurd Drama’ for Arts Faculty in 2007.

=== As a research associate ===
Senior Fellowship on ‘Neuroscience & Theatre’ financed by Ministry Of Culture, Govt Of India.

=== Honours ===
- 50 Emerging Stars of India by The Week (Independence Day special Issue 2003).
- Best Playwright of the Year in 2002, by West Bengal Youth Council .
- Best Play of the Year in 2007, by Information & culture Dept., Govt. of West Bengal for the play "Surjo-Pora Chhai".
- Best Playwright of the Year in 2008, Satyen Mitra Award by Theatre Workshop for play "Surjo-Pora Chhai".
- Best Director of the Year in 2008, Shyamal Sen Smriti Puraskar by Theatre Group SwapnaSandhani for the play "Surjo-Pora Chhai".
- Best Director of the Year in 2009, by Information & Culture Dept., Govt. of West Bengal for the play "Dream Dream".
- Best Play of the Year in 2010, by Sudrak for the play "Dream Dream".
- Dinabandhu Mitra Smriti Sammanana in 2011, by Bongaon Natyacharcha Kendra.
- Best Director of the Year in 2012, rajat Jayanti Swarak Samman from Anya Theatre, for "DEVI SARPAMASTA".
- NAVENDU SMRITI SAMMAN 2012 To The Director Debesh Chattopadhyay, for "BIKELE BHORER SHORSHE PHOOL".
- ZEE GAURAV AWARD To The Director Debesh Chattopadhyay, for " BIKELE BHORER SHORSHE PHOOL".
- ZEE GAURAV AWARD for best production " BIKELE BHORER SHORSHE PHOOL".
- ZEE GAURAV JURI AWARD To The Writer Debesh Chattopadhyay, for " BRAIN".

== Works ==
=== Plays ===
(in alphabetical order)

- Agnibarshi (Theatre Canvas)
- Brain (Sansriti)
- Bikele Bhorer Shorshe Phool (Sansriti)
- Break Fail (Sansriti)
- Chena Dukhho Chena Sukh (Mukhomukhi)
- Debi Sarpamasta (Minerva Repertory Theatre)
- Dream Dream (Sansriti)
- Fandi Gram (Sansriti)
- Griha Prabesh (Onyo Theatre)
- Hayabadana (THEATRE CANVAS)
- Nekre o Bhera (Sansriti)
- Shey (Sansriti)
- Surjo Pra Chai (Sansriti)
- Tetri Kahani (Sansriti)
- Fetaru (Sansriti)
- Siddhidata(Sansriti)
- Tughlak(Sansriti)
- Maow(Sansriti)
- Saudagorer Nouka (Sansriti)
- Chand Manasar Kissa (Sansriti)
- Kothakar Choritro Kothay Rekhecho (Sansriti)
- “Khokkos” (“Sansriti”)
- “Antigone”(“Sansriti”)

=== Films ===
- The Play (Unreleased)
- Chaplin (2011)
- Herbert
- The Eken: Benaras e Bibhishika (2025)
- Phool Pishi O Edward (2026)
- Winkle Twinkle (2026)

=== TV series ===
- Harano Sur
- Chhotolok on ZEE5
- Kaalratri on Hoichoi

== Awards ==
FCCI Award for Best Debut Director (Natoker Moto) at HBFF-2016 Citation: "For the sensitive cinematic portrayal of the struggle of a dedicated artistic soul in a powerful visual odyssey that reinforces cinema, theater and lived life." Jury members: Siladitya Sen, Madhu Eravankara, and Dalton L
