= Critics Circle =

Critics Circle may refer to:

Theatre

- The Critics' Circle
- New York Drama Critics' Circle
- Outer Critics Circle Award

Film

- Film Critics Circle of Australia
- Film Critics Circle of India
- Florida Film Critics Circle
- London Film Critics Circle (subsidiary to The Critics' Circle)
- National Book Critics Circle
- New York Film Critics Circle
- San Francisco Film Critics Circle
- Vancouver Film Critics Circle
