= Nagarvadhu =

Courtesan in ancient India

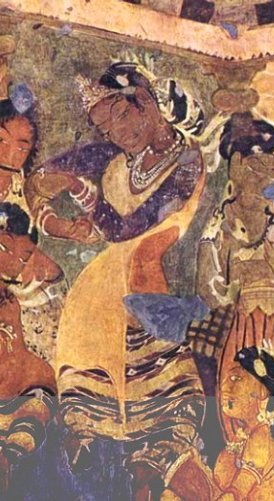
A mural from the Ajanta Caves depicting a dancer.

Nagarvadhu (also Nagaravadhu or Nagar Vadhu; Devanagari: नगरवधू; lit. 'bride of the city') was a tradition followed in some parts of ancient India.

Women competed to win the title of a nagarvadhu, and there was no taboo against the practice. The most beautiful woman, and most talented in various dance forms, was chosen as the Nagarvadhu.

A nagarvadhu was a royal courtesan; people could watch her dance and sing. A Nagarvadhu's price for a single night's dance was very high, and was only accessible to the wealthy, such as emperors, kings, princes and lords.

== Famous nagarvadhus ==
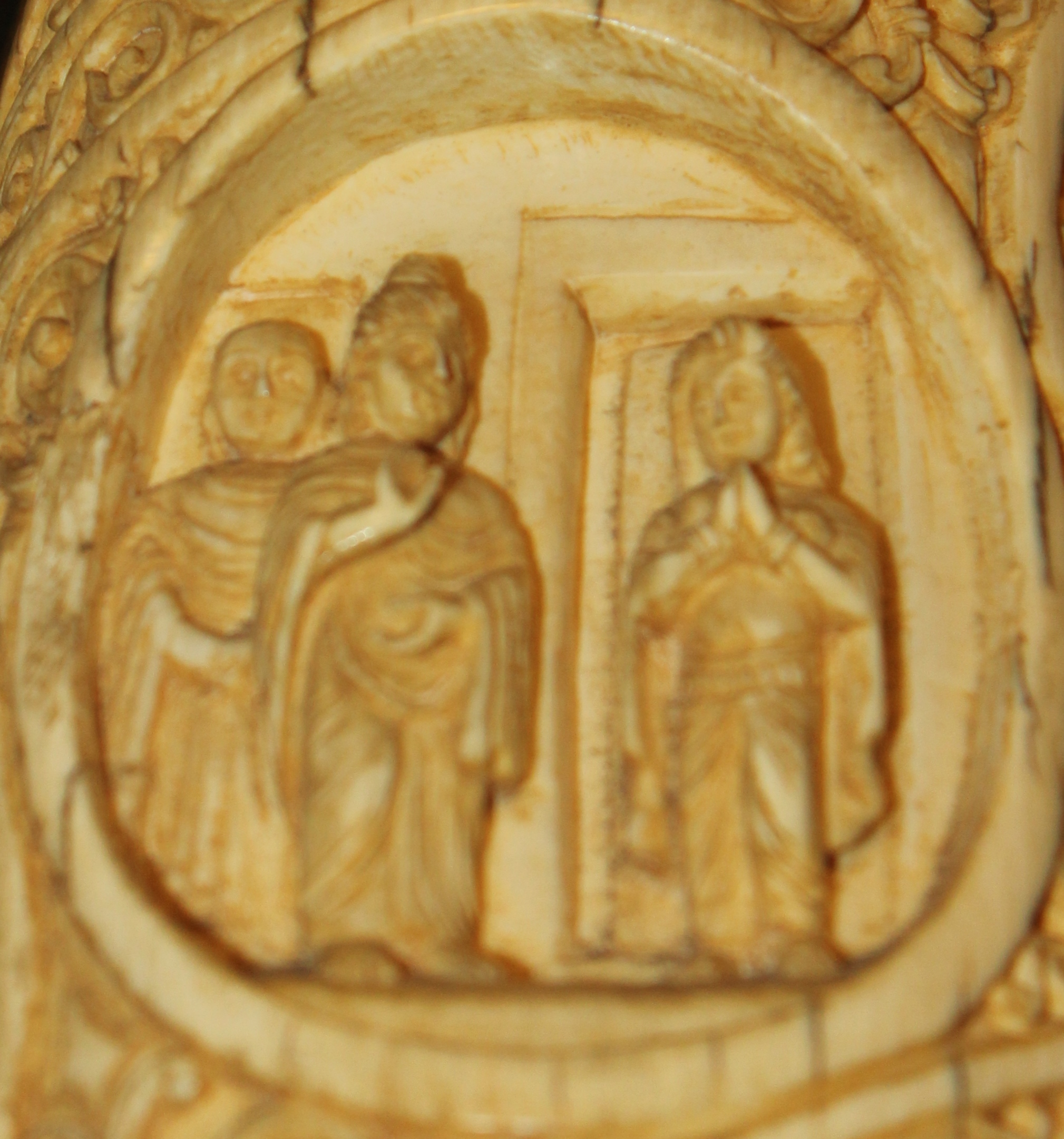
"Amrapali greets Buddha", ivory carving, National Museum, New Delhi. Amrapali was a celebrated nagarvadhu (royal courtesan) of the republic of Vaishali in ancient India

- Amrapali, state courtesan and Buddhist disciple, described in Vaishali Ki Nagarvadhu by Acharya Chatursen
- Vasantasena, a character in the classic Sanskrit story of Mricchakatika, written in the 2nd century BC by Śūdraka
- Madhavi, a character in the classic Tamil story of Silappatikaram, written by Ilango Adigal

== See also ==
- Devadasi
- Deuki
- Ca trù, a similar profession in Vietnam
- Qiyan, a similar profession in Arab
- Geisha, a similar profession in Japan
- Shirabyōshi, a similar profession in Japan
- Kisaeng, a similar profession in Korea
- Gaṇikā, a similar profession in India
- Tawaif, a similar profession in India
- Gējì, a similar profession in China
