= Vaishali ki Nagarvadhu =

Two-part Hindi novel by Acharya Chatursen Shastri (1948-1949)

Vaishali ki Nagarvadhu (Hindi:वैशाली की नगरवधू) (literally, Nagar Vadhu or royal city bride/courtesan of Vaishali) is a two-part Hindi novel by Acharya Chatursen Shastri, published in 1948-49. It is part historical fiction, part biographical novel, which showcases the lustful nature of society as well as other aspects of culture and history of early Buddhist era India. Shashtri famously declared that he has disowned all of his other works and declared 'Vaishali ki Nagarvadhu' as his only work.

It tells the story of Āmrapālī, also known as "Ambapālika" or "Ambapali", a celebrated nagarvadhu (royal courtesan) of the Republic of Vaishali in ancient India around 500 BC. Vaishali was only a republican state at that time, where the people vote on every matter, and is described as incredibly rich and prosperous. When Ambapali comes of age, she is declared the nagarvadhu against her will. Enraged at the Republic for taking away her autonomy, she becomes determined to destroy it. The book is set in a time of great socio-political turmoil, and Ambapali is at the centre of it all, both knowingly and unknowingly. She has several lovers and wanted her son to become the ruler of the kingdom of Magadha. The book also explores the concepts of caste, gender, slavery, class, and the political systems of the era.
