= Amrapali =

Ancient Indian royal courtesan who figured in early Buddhism

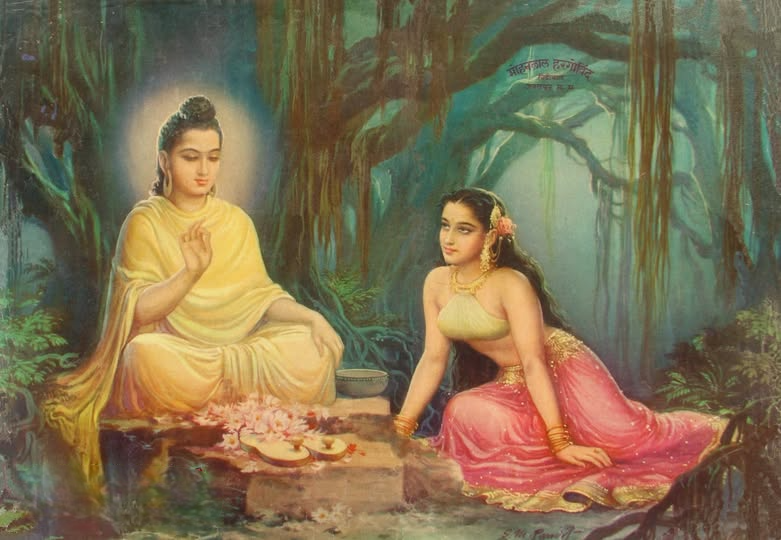
- Buddha-Amrapali by S. M. Pandit, 1950
- Born: c. 500 BCE; Vaishali
- Died: Vaishali
- Occupation: Nagaravadhu (royal courtesan) of the republic of Vaishali
- Known for: Early follower of Gautama Buddha

Āmrapālī, also known as Ambapālika, Ambapali, or Amra, was a celebrated and beautiful nagarvadhu (royal courtesan) of the Republic of Vaishali (located in present-day Bihar) in ancient India, around 500 BC, and later a devout follower of the Buddha who attained arhatship. She also held the title of rajnartaki (court dancer).

According to tradition, Āmrapālī was born miraculously at the foot of a mango tree in the royal gardens at Vaishali and was named accordingly, from the Pāli word amba, meaning "mango". Many princes sought her hand, and in order to end the resulting rivalry it was decided that she should become a courtesan. In later life she became a devoted follower of the Buddha. She established a monastery (vihāra) in her own mango grove, known as Ambapali vana, and donated the property to the Buddha's order. The Buddha stayed there shortly before his death. After accepting Āmrapālī's invitation to dine with her, he declined a subsequent invitation from the local princes. The grove is also associated with his preaching of the Ambapalika Sutra.

Āmrapālī is mentioned in early Pāli texts and Buddhist traditions, including the Āgama sutras. She had a son who became an elder in the Buddhist order. She herself eventually renounced worldly life and, through contemplation of the ageing of her own body, gained insight into impermanence and attained arhatship.

== Early life ==
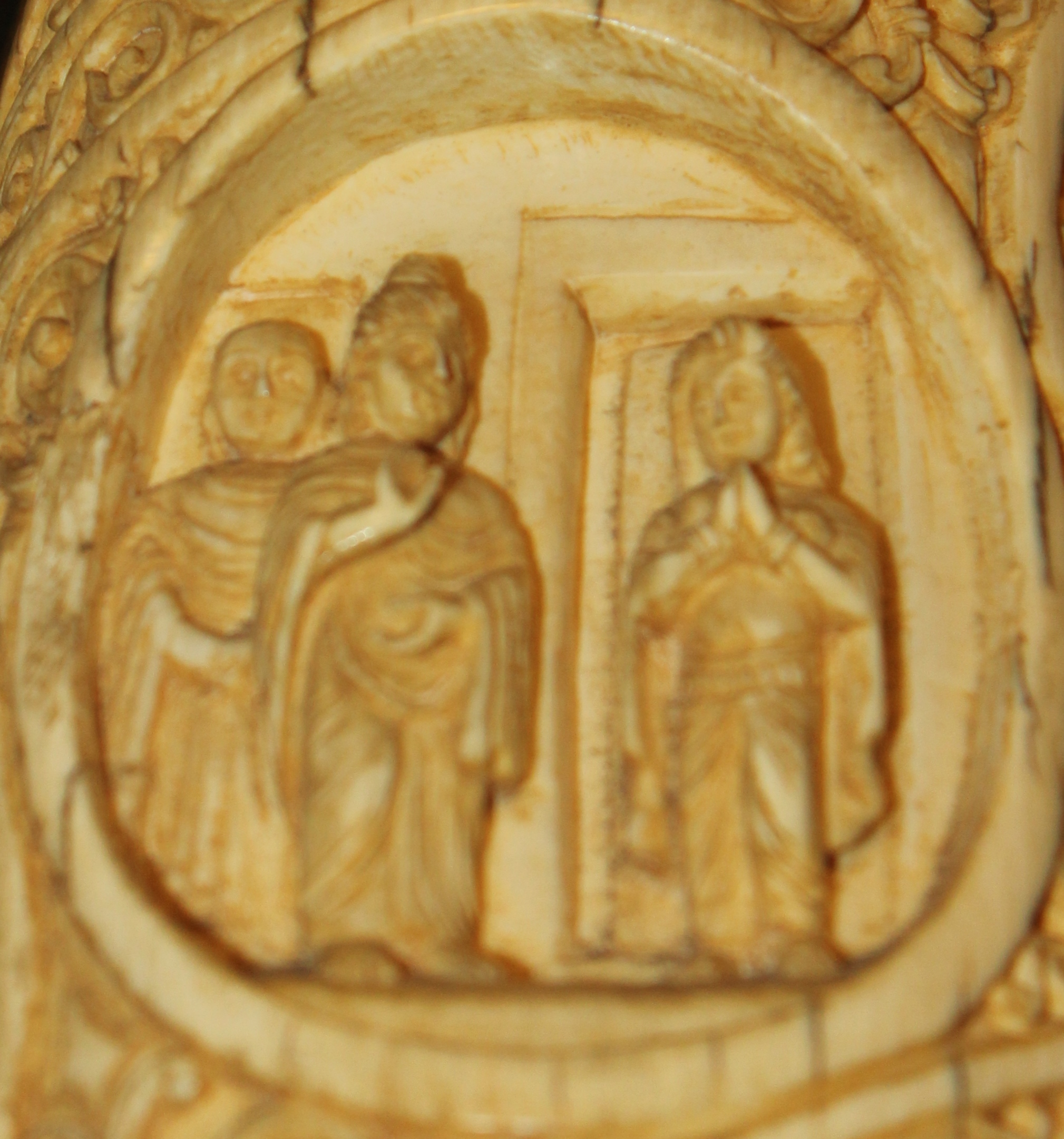
"Amrapali greets Buddha", ivory carving, National Museum, New Delhi. Amrapali was a celebrated nagarvadhu (royal courtesan) of the republic of Vaishali in ancient India

In Myanmar Buddhism, she was born numinously under a mango tree without birth by human. So, she is called by Amrapali (mean the mango tree born lady).

Amrapali was born around 600-500 BCE, to Mahanama & an unknown mother. Etymologically, the variants on her name derive from a combination of two Sanskrit words: amra, meaning mango, and pallawa, meaning young leaves or sprouts. It is said that she was spontaneously born at the foot of a mango tree in one of the royal gardens in Vaishali — hence her name.

Even as a young maiden, Amrapali was exceptionally beautiful and ethereal. It is said that a feudal lord by the name of Mahanaman was so enchanted by the young Amrapali's beauty that she abandoned his kingdom and moved to Ambara village, a small hamlet in Vaishali presently in Muzaffarpur.

== As a courtesan ==
Vaishali was the capital city of the Licchavi tribe, one of the eight Khattiya (Sanskrit Kshatriya) clans that had united to form the Vajjian confederacy. The king was elected by an electoral college consisting of princes and nobles from the Kshatriya clans. It was customary that the most beautiful women in the land, rather than marrying one man, dedicated themselves to the pleasure of many.

Amrapali grew up to be a lady of extraordinary charm and grace, and was talented in many art forms. Many young nobles desired her company. When Manudev, king of Vaishali, saw Amrapali perform a dance in the city, he plotted to "own" her. He murdered Amrapali's childhood love and would-be-groom, Pushpakumar, on the day of their wedding, and afterwards made an official announcement declaring Amrapali as the 'bride' of Vaishali — i.e. the Nagarvadhu. She was also bestowed with the title of Vaishali Janpad Kalayani, given to the most beautiful and talented girl of the kingdom for a period of seven years. Amrapali had the right to choose her lovers, but according to the aforementioned custom, she could not be committed to any one man.

After being declared a Nagarvadhu. Her talent and beauty attracted so many men that the glory of Vaishali during this period is often attributed to Amrapali's fame. The price to see Amrapali's art form was fifty Karshapanas per night, and her treasury grew much larger than the treasuries of some kings.

It is said that Amrapali was declared the "most beautiful" girl at the age of 11 and was later made nagarvadhu. She was also a celebrated rajnartaki (court dancer) in the ancient Vaishali. Amrapali was proficient in music, dance, hunting, archery, horse handling, and had great love for classical songs and dance.

== Legends associated with Amrapali ==
=== Amrapali and Bimbisara ===
Stories of her beauty travelled to the ears of Bimbisara, king of the hostile neighbouring kingdom of Magadha. He attacked Vaishali, and took refuge in Amrapali's house. Bimbisara was a good musician. Before long, Amrapali and Bimbisara fell in love. When she learned his true identity, Amrapali asked Bimbisara to leave and cease his war. Bimbisara, smitten with love, did as she asked. In the eyes of the people of Vaishali, this incident made him a coward. Later, Amrapali bore him a son named Vimala Kondanna.

Ajatashatru, Bimbisara's son by Queen Chellana (according to Jaina traditions) or Queen Kosala Devi (according to Buddhist traditions), later invaded Vaishali due to a dispute with his brothers. He was so moved by her beauty that when Amrapali was imprisoned, he burned the whole of Vaishali. Almost everyone died in the massacre, except his beloved Amrapali, but when she saw the condition of her motherland, she renounced her love for him.

=== Amrapali and the Buddha ===
In Buddhist records, Amrapali is noted as having had the opportunity to serve food to the Buddha during his last visit to Vaishali, shortly before his death. Amrapali attended his sermon at a nearby grove and was so deeply moved by it that she invited him for a meal at her quarters. In other accounts, it is stated that the Buddha himself took shelter in her mango groves and was visited by Amrapali who paid her obeisance to him and then extended the invitation. He consented to her proposal with silence. On her way back, her chariot collided with that of the princely nobles of Vaishali who were also heading to invite the Buddha to dine with them. They berate her by calling her a 'mango-woman' and ask her, a woman of ill repute, to move aside and let her superiors pass. It is then that she announces that the Buddha was coming to her house for a meal. The princes were upset and offered her gold in return of the privilege of hosting the Buddha but she refuses. Buddha also turns them down, having already committed to Amrapali.

Buddha recognised her beauty and advised his disciples to be mindful in her presence lest they become infatuated with her. Amrapali received the Buddha with her retinue in her grand residence which had been specially decorated for the occasion. It was no less than the palace of any king; such was the wealth she commanded. At the conclusion of the meal, she offered to the Buddha and his order her entire property including her groves which became the venue for several sermons on mindfulness. Soon thereafter, she renounced her position as courtesan or court dancer, accepted the Buddhist way, and remained an active supporter of the Buddhist order. She dedicated her life to the service of the poor and the destitutes.

On growing up, Amrapali's son, Vimala Kondanna also became a Buddhist monk and a renowned elder.

== Attitudes towards courtesans in scriptures ==
The story of Amrapali is significant for understanding contemporary attitudes of courtesans. Though she received much fame as a talented artist, she was also berated by the noble princes of Vaishali by calling her "Gaṇikā" which carried derogatory connotations. However, unlike them, Buddha did not share that kind of prejudice towards her. He ate at her residence and accepted her grove for the Buddhist order. This is often quoted as an example for his unbiased regard towards women. However, what has been noticed is that with the passage of time and as the Therīgāthā was collated, this bias also entered the Buddhist fold.

Amrapali's possible alliance with Bimbisara has also survived mainly through an oral tradition and has not found its way into the Pali Canon of Buddhism. This is because Bimbisara was a great royal patron of Buddhism and his links with Amrapali may throw a negative light on him. Amrapali's mention in the canon also focuses mostly on the later part of her life when she converted to Buddhism. However, records of Chinese travellers who came to India in search of Buddhist texts have made note of Amrapali's early life and her relationship with Bimbisara. The latter is found in the Chinese Recension of the Buddhist tripitaka. This narrative has been written in the Mahayana tradition and therefore did not have the onus of representing Bimbisara in a positive light.

A third set of scriptures which refer to the story of Amrapali, and do so most elaborately, come from the Gilgit area of Kashmir and are therefore known as the Gilgit Manuscripts. These are the Tibetan-Sanskrit scriptures of the Mulasarvastivada branch of Buddhism which hold her in high esteem. However, the negative connotation of being a courtesan is still present. Thus, the cultural memory of a courtesan shows a complex pattern, varying across time and place.

== In popular culture ==
- Amrapali has been the subject of three biographical films: Amrapali (1945) starring Sabita Devi, Jagdish Sethi, Prem Adeeb, Amrapali (1959) starring Supriya Devi as Amrapali and Asit Baran as King Ajatashatru, and Amrapali (1966), starring Vyjayanthimala as Amrapali and Sunil Dutt as Emperor Ajatashatru.
- Bollywood actress Hema Malini produced, directed, and starred in a television series called Women of India, which depicted the story of Amrapali. The music for the Amrapali segment of the series was composed by Hridaynath Mangeshkar along with Ravindra Jain.
- Amrapali has been the subject of various books, including Vaishali Ki Nagarvadhu, a 1948 Hindi novel by Acharya Chatursen, and Ambapali, a 1962 novel by Vimala Raina. A recent work in English, The Legend of Amrapali: An Enchanting Saga Buried Within the Sands of Time, was completed by author Anurag Anand in 2012.
- A television series, Amrapali, was telecast on DD National in 2002.
- Amrapali is also mentioned in the book 'Heroines' by historian writer Ira Mukhoty.

== See also ==
- Nagarvadhu
- Buddha (TV series)
- Fa-Hien
- Upagupta
- List of Amar Chitra Katha comics
- Amar Chitra Katha
- Vasavadatta

== Notes ==
- Khanna, Anita (2004). Stories Of The Buddha. Children's Book Trust. ISBN 978-81-7011-913-5.
- Vyasa & Vigneswara Malayalam Novel written by Anand
- Novel: Vaishali ki Nagarvadhu by Acharya Chatursen, 1948
- Khuddaka Nikaya, part 9 (Therigatha) Canto 13
- Digha Nikaya 16 (Mahaparinibbanasutta - part 2, 16-26)
- Malalasekera: Buddhist Dictionary of Pali Proper Names (s.v.)
- The Legend of Amrapali by Anurag Anand
- Rev. Osho - A story on Buddha and Amrapali
