= Chatursen Shastri =

Indian writer of Hindi literature (1891–1960)

Acharya Chatursen Shastri
- Born: Chaturbhuj; 26 August 1891; Aurangabad Chandok, Uttar Pradesh, India
- Died: 2 February 1960 (aged 68)
- Occupation: Writer

Acharya Chatursen Shastri (26 August 1891 – 2 February 1960) was an Indian writer of Hindi literature. He wrote many historical fictions, including Vaishali ki Nagarvadhu adapted into a feature film (1948), Vayam Rakshamah (1951), Somnath (1954), and Dharamputra which was adapted into the 1961 feature film of the same name.

== Biography ==
Acharya Chatursen Shastri was born in a small village Aurangabad Chandok (near Anupshahr) in the Bulandshahr district of Uttar Pradesh state in India on 26 August 1891. His father was Punditt Kewal Ram Thakur and mother was Nanhee Devi. His birth name was Chaturbhuj.

Chaturbhuj finished his primary education in a school in Sikandrabad. Then he got admitted to Sanskrit College, Jaipur, Rajasthan. From here he received the degrees of Ayurvedacharya in Ayurveda and Shastri in Sanskrit in the year 1915. He also received the degree of Ayurvedacharya from Ayurveda Vidyapeetha.

After finishing his education he came to Delhi to start his practice as an ayurvedic physician. He opened his own ayurvedic dispensary in Delhi but it did not run well and he had to close it down. He joined a rich man's charitable dispensary at the salary of rupees 25 per month. Later in 1917, he joined DAV College, Lahore (now in Pakistan) as senior professor of Ayurveda. The management at the DAV college, Lahore was insulting to him, therefore, he resigned and went to Ajmer to help his father-in-law in his dispensary. Working at this dispensary, he started to write and soon became famous as a story writer and novelist.

His first novel Hridaya-Ki-Parakh (Trial of the Heart) was published in 1918. It did not bring him any recognition. His second book, Satyagraha Aur Asahyoga (Civil Resistance and Non-cooperation) was published in 1921. This brought immense attention to Acharya Chatursen Shastri. These were followed by many historical novels, stories and ayurvedic books.

Acharya Chatursen Shastri took his last breath on 2 February 1960.

== Career ==
His books present an idealistic view of the ancient period as can be seen clearly in his famous book Purnahuti. In this book he gives a eulogical account of Prithiviraj Chauhan's life and the battles fought. They are not historical but give details of life in ancient India. These books can be seen as a logical binding of history and philosophy and are worth recommending to anyone who is looking to know more about India before the advent of Islam. In his foreword to his book, 'Vaishali ki Nagarvadhu', he declares this is his first book and the ones prior to this one as worthless; the book is declared most fictional account and agenda driven by critics.

He was a friend of Jawaharlal Nehru.

== Writings ==
The bulk of his literary output is almost unparalleled in Hindi. In all, he wrote 72 published books including 8 historical novels, 10 dramas, 4 historical non-fictions, 15 collections of essays on political subjects and an equal number on the subjects of health and medicine. He also published over 250 short stories in various Hindi periodicals over time. His novel Dharamputra was adapted into the Hindi film, Dharmputra (1961) by Yash Chopra, it won the National Film Award for Best Feature Film in Hindi.

His major works include:-

- Vaishali ki Nagarvadhu (वैशाली की नगरवधू) (1948) ISBN 81-7028-282-9 - based on the historical figure Amrapali
- Vayam Rakshamah (वयं रक्षाम:)(1955) - based on life of character of Ravana (from Ramayana)
- Sahyadri ki chattanen(1960) - based on Shivaji's times and life
- Goli (गोली)(1961) - about cruel exploitation, sexual subjugation and tragic lives of female house-slaves within the royal palaces of rajasthan
- Bagule ka pankh (बगुले का पंख)(1954) - about the political opportunism, corruption, and moral decay in post-independence Indian society through the rise of an ambitious opportunist named Jugnu.
- Dharamputra (धर्मपुत्र)(1954) - about the identity crisis and inner conflict of a young boy born to a Muslim mother but raised by a Hindu family, who grows up to become a radical Hindu extremist before learning the truth about his birth.
- Sona aur Khoon (सोना और ख़ून)(1957) - historical novel set against the backdrop of Islamic invasions in India
- Neelmani (नीलमणि)(1956) - a romantic social novel that explores the complex emotional journeys, societal pressures, and evolving relationships of its main characters within Indian society.
- Narmedh (नरमेध)(1960) - historical and mythological novel that explores the dark practices of human sacrifice, the clash of early civilizations, and the profound moral evolution of human society.
- Somnath Mahalay (सोमनाथ)(1954) - Based on invasion of Mahmud Ghazni and destruction of Somnath temple
- Bharat mein Islam (भारत में इस्लाम)(1971) - published after his death
- Achchi Aadatein (अच्छी आदतें)(1954) - practical guide focused on cultivating healthy personal habits.
- Aparajita (अपराजिता)(1958) - social novel that portrays the struggles, emotional resilience, and ultimate triumph of a woman fighting against societal injustices and traditional prejudices.
- Aadarsh Bhojan (आदर्श भोजन)(1954) - practical guide that promotes balanced nutrition.
- Nirog Jivan (नीरोग जीवन)(1954) - health guide providing practical tips on Ayurveda
- Eedo (ईदो) - based on events from The great Depression (1929–1934) and World War II (1939–1945)
- Hindi Bhasha aur Sahitya Ka Itihas (1946) - A History of Hindi Language and its literature
- Hridaya Ki Parakh (1918) - social novel that explores the complexities of human relationships
- Satyagraha Aur Asahyoga (1921) - about Civil Resistance and Non-cooperation
- Aabha (आभा)(1927) - novel about young women's struggle, societal expectations and emotional resilience in contempary indian society.
- Roothi Rani(रूठी रानी)(1974) - story collection with 10 other stories
- Purnahuti(पूर्णाहुति)(1955) - historical novel showcasing the epic romance, valor, and ultimate sacrifices of Prithviraj Chauhan and Sanyogita against foreign invaders.

== Bibliography ==
- Amaresh Datta (1987). Encyclopaedia of Indian Literature: A-Devo (Vol. 1). Sahitya Akademi. p. 657. ISBN 8126018038.
