= Amrapali (film) =

1966 film by Lekh Tandon

- Directed by: Lekh Tandon
- Written by: Story & Screenplay: Omkar Sahib; Dialogue: Arjun Dev Rashk; Balbir Singh (Additional dialogue)
- Produced by: F.C. Mehra
- Starring: Sunil Dutt; Vyjayanthimala; Prem Nath
- Cinematography: Dwarka Divecha
- Edited by: Pran Mehra
- Music by: Shankar–Jaikishan
- Production company: Eagle Films
- Release date: 11 September 1966
- Country: India
- Language: Hindi

Amrapali is a 1966 historical Hindi film directed by Lekh Tandon, starring Sunil Dutt and Vyjayanthimala as leads. The film's music was by Shankar–Jaikishan.

It was based on the life of Amrapali (Ambapali), the nagarvadhu (royal courtesan) of Vaishali in present-day Bihar, the capital of the Licchavi republic in ancient India around 500 BC, and Ajatashatru, the Haryanka emperor of the Magadha empire, who falls in love with her. Although he destroys Vaishali to get her, she has been transformed by her encounter with Gautama Buddha in the meantime, of whom she becomes a disciple and an Arahant. Her story is mentioned in old Pali texts and Buddhist traditions.

The film was selected as the Indian entry for the Best Foreign Language Film at the 39th Academy Awards, but was not accepted as a nominee. Although the film was not a commercial success, its reputation has grown over time and it is now regarded as a classic of Hindi cinema. It is remembered for its dramatic war scenes, distinctive costumes by Bhanu Athaiya and strong anti-war sentiment.

Shah Rukh Khan's Red Chillies Entertainment own the rights to the film.

== Plot ==
His hunger for conquest not satiated, even after repeated victories, Maharaja (Great King) Ajatashatru (Sunil Dutt) of Magadha would like to continue on his winning spree, as the only unconquered city is that of Vaishali. His astrologers forewarn him; his Senapati (General) (Prem Nath) cautions him that his army is tired and needs to rest; his very own mother refuses to let him take part in any war - but he refuses to listen to anyone and hastens to war - which leads to subsequent defeat at the hands of the Vaishali Army. Wounded, lost, and on the run from enemy soldiers, Ajatshatru dons the guise of a Vaishali soldier and takes shelter with a woman named Amrapali (Vyjayanthimala). She nurses him back to health but Amrapali doesn't know that he is the Ajatashatru of Magadh yet they fall in love with each other.

Ajatashatru finds an ally in Senapati Badbadhra Singh (K. N. Singh) and both start to plot against Vaishali - this time by reducing the number of soldiers, making them addicted to alcohol, poor training methods, and poor pay - thus demoralizing them, and paving the way for an easy victory for Magadha. Amrapali, winning a dance competition, is crowned the Rajnarthaki (Government Dancer) of Vaishali. She is known to everyone as a true patriot. One day, she finds out that the soldier she loves is none other than Ajatashatru. Being a true patriot, she breaks all ties with him and tells him to never see her again. Heartbroken, she tells the ruler of Vaishali that she would like to leave the position of Rajnarthaki. The members of the court put pressure on her and everyone finds out that she had fallen in love with Ajatashatru and declares her a traitor.

The ruler of Vaishali sentences her to life in a dungeon with orders to execute her on a full moon night. Ajatshatru, who is enraged to hear this, gathers his army, storms the unsuspecting people of Vaishali, and virtually burns the city down, killing almost everyone in it. He then rushes to free his beloved from the dungeons. He does set her free - but it is not the same Amrapali - this Amrapali is quite different and not at all thrilled to be in the presence of her conqueror lover. She is taken by him to the battlefield and is shown everyone he killed just to get her. She is horrified to see so much bloodshed. She says she can't live like this anymore and surrenders herself to Gautama Buddha (Narendra Nath). Ajatashatru also follows her and surrenders himself.

== Cast ==
- Sunil Dutt – Ajatashatru
- Vyjayanthimala – Amrapali
- Prem Nath – Senapati Veer of Magadh
- Bipin Gupta – Vaishali's gana mukhya
- Gajanan Jagirdar – Kulpati Mahanam
- K.N. Singh – Senapati Balbadra Singh
- Madhavi – Raj Nartaki
- Mridula Rani – Rajamata (Ajaat Shatru's Mother)
- Ruby Myers – Vaishali's first lady
- Narendra Nath – Gautama Buddha
- Baburao Pendharkar – Vaishali gana mukhya's advisor (in the song Neel Gagan Ki...)
- Bela Bose - Vaishali village girl
- Zul Vellani - Som, Kulpati's son
- Randhir (actor)
- Nazir Kashmiri
- Keshav Rana - Vaishali soldier
- Gopi Krishna - Lead dancer, in celebration dance

== Crew ==
- Art Direction: M.R. Acharekar
- Dance director: Gopi Krishna
- Costume Design: Bhanu Athaiya

== Music ==
Another highlight of the film was its music by the duo Shankar Jaikishan, then at the peak of their career, who gave a highly restrained yet fully Indian classical music-based score in the four songs, another rarity in the period film of the era to have so few songs. All the songs were sung by Lata Mangeshkar who also has some of her career's finest among them, including, "Tumhen Yaad Karte Karte", "Neel Gagan Ki Chhaon Mein" and "Jao Re Jogi".

=== Track list ===
#	Title	Singer(s)	Lyricists	Raga
1	"Jao Re"	Lata Mangeshkar	Shailendra	Kamod
2	"Tumhen Yaad Karte Karte"	Lata Mangeshkar	Shailendra	
3	"Neel Gagan Ki Chhaon Mein"	Lata Mangeshkar	Hasrat Jaipuri	Bhoopali
4	"Tadap Yeh Din Raat Ki"	Lata Mangeshkar	Shailendra	
5	"Nacho Gao Nacho Dhoom Machao"	Lata Mangeshkar	Shailendra	

== In popular culture ==
A scene from the film is used in the Dhoom tana song video in film Om Shanti Om (2007), wherein Deepika Padukone dances as Vyjayantimala's Amrapali. The latter was digitally removed from the frames, as Deepika was playing an actor of the 1970s.

== See also ==
- List of historical drama films of Asia
- List of submissions to the 39th Academy Awards for Best Foreign Language Film
- List of Indian submissions for the Academy Award for Best Foreign Language Film
- Chitralekha (1964)
