= Bhupendra Kainthola =

Indian civil servant

- Occupations: Principal Director General (East), PIB, Kolkata

Bhupendra Kainthola (born March 15, 1966), Indian Information Service (IIS) officer, is the current Principal Director General, and is serving as Registrar of Newspapers of India (RNI). Prior to this, he was heading East Zone of the Press Information Bureau (PIB).

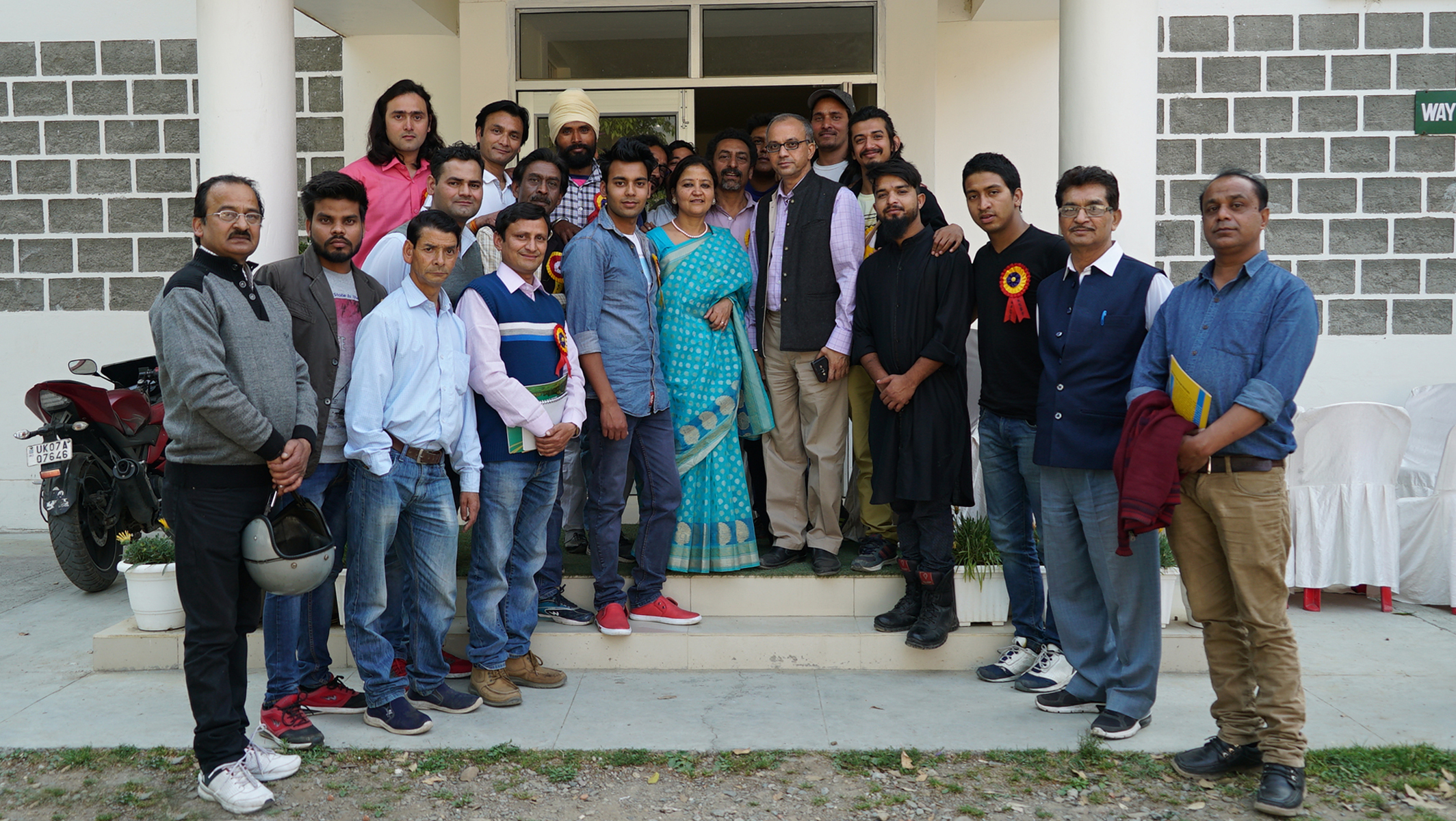
Shalini Shah, artistic director of Kautik Student Film Festival, and some of the other organisers, with FTII director Bhupendra Kainthola

== Previous posts ==
- Director General (East Zone), Press Information Bureau
- Director, Film and Television Institute of India
- Additional Director General, Doordarshan (News)
- Director, Directorate of Advertising and Visual Publicity (DAVP)
- Director, National Film Awards
- Director, Indian Panorama
- Director, Press Information Bureau (PIB)

== See also ==
- Press Information Bureau
- Film and Television Institute of India
