= Aurangabad Chandok =

Coordinates: 28°36′28″N 78°07′09″E

Aurangabad Chandok is a village in Shikarpur block/tehsil of Bulandshahr district in the Indian state of Uttar Pradesh.

According to Census 2011 information, the location code or village code of Aurangabad Chandok village is 121368. Aurangabad Chandok village is located in Shikarpur Tehsil of Bulandshahr district in Uttar Pradesh, India. It is situated 11 km away from sub-district headquarters Shikarpur and 25 km away from district headquarters Bulandshahr. As per 2009 stats, Aurangabad Chandok village is also a gram panchayat.

The total geographical area of village is 1428.633 hectares. Aurangabad Chandok has a total population of 6,732 people. There are about 1,180 houses in Aurangabad Chandok village. Jahangirabad is nearest town to Aurangabad Chandok which is approximately 5 km away.
