= Ratnottama Sengupta =

Indian film journalist, festival curator/organiser and author

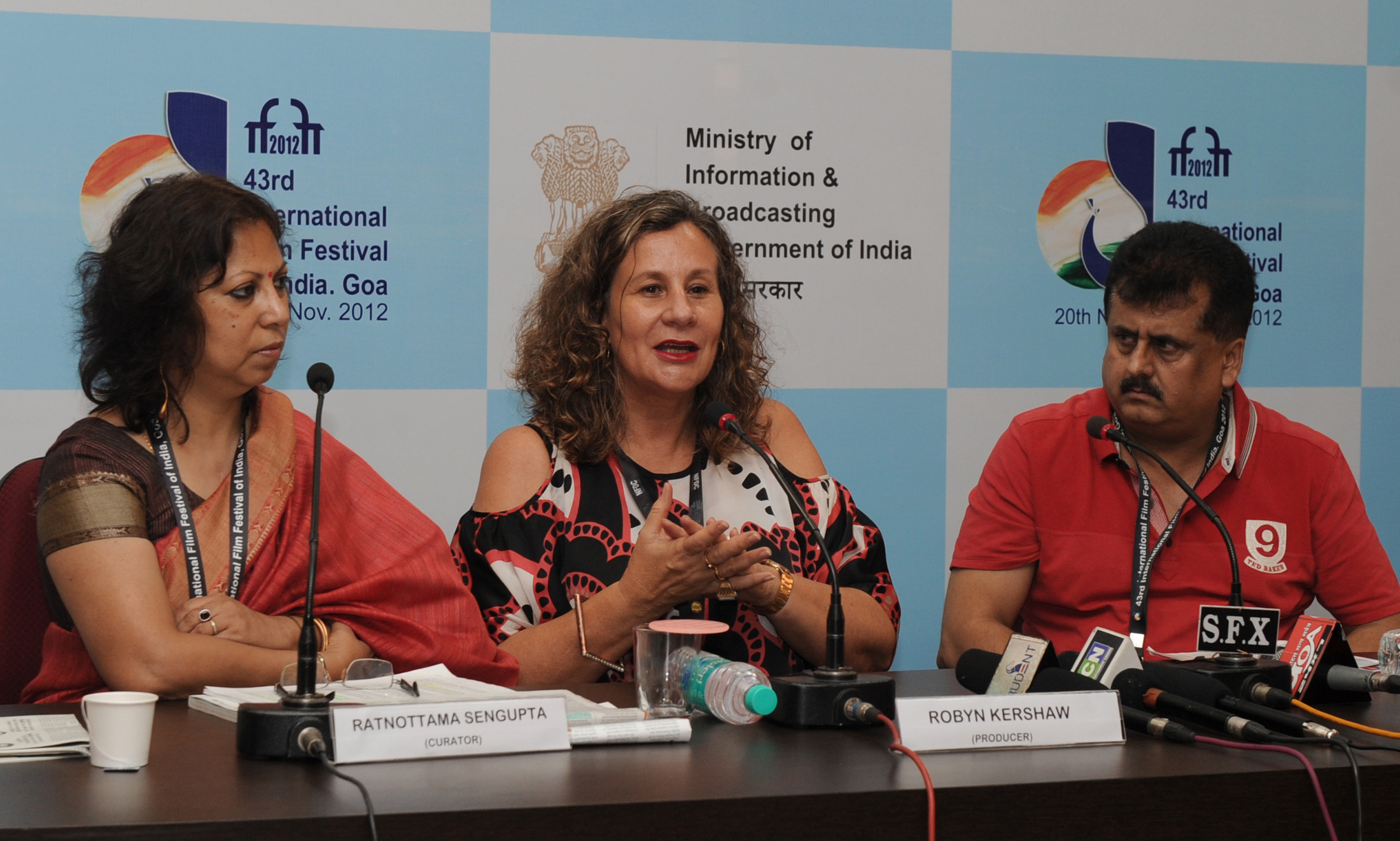
- Sengupta at IFFI 2012
- Born: 27 January 1955 (age 71)
- Occupation: Film journalist / festival curator / author

Ratnottama Sengupta (born 27 January 1955) is an Indian film journalist, festival curator/organiser and author. She is a recipient of the National Film Award, and has served on several international film juries. She is the daughter of scriptwriter Nabendu Ghosh,

== Member of film jury ==
- 54th National Film Awards
- Kautik International Student Film Festival

== Author/editor ==
Editor

- That Bird Called Happiness
- Alternate Lyricism

Author

- Krishna's Cosmos: The Creativity of an Artist, Sculptor & Teacher
- A Life in Veil - Suchitra Sen

== See also ==
- Film Critics Circle of India
