= Shalini Shah =

- Partner: Rajesh Shah
- Writing career
- Notable awards: National Film Award for Best Historical Reconstruction /Compilation Film

Shalini Shah (b May 17, 1968) is an Indian filmmaker, documentary director and film educator. She is a film faculty member at Kumaun University; and the artistic-director/co-founder of the Kautik International Student Film Festival, Nainital, Uttrakhand.

She received the 2000 National Film Award for Best Historical Reconstruction/Compilation Film for her film From the land of Buddhism to the Land of Buddha (2000). She subsequently directed the feature film Samosa & Sons and served as a jury member at the National Film Awards and the International Film Festival of India.

== Biography ==
=== Early life and education ===
Born in 1968 and she hails from Nainital, Uttarakhand. After completing her postgraduate studies in Chemistry and pursued a course in multimedia applications at Birla Institute of Technology and Science, Pilani.

=== Career ===
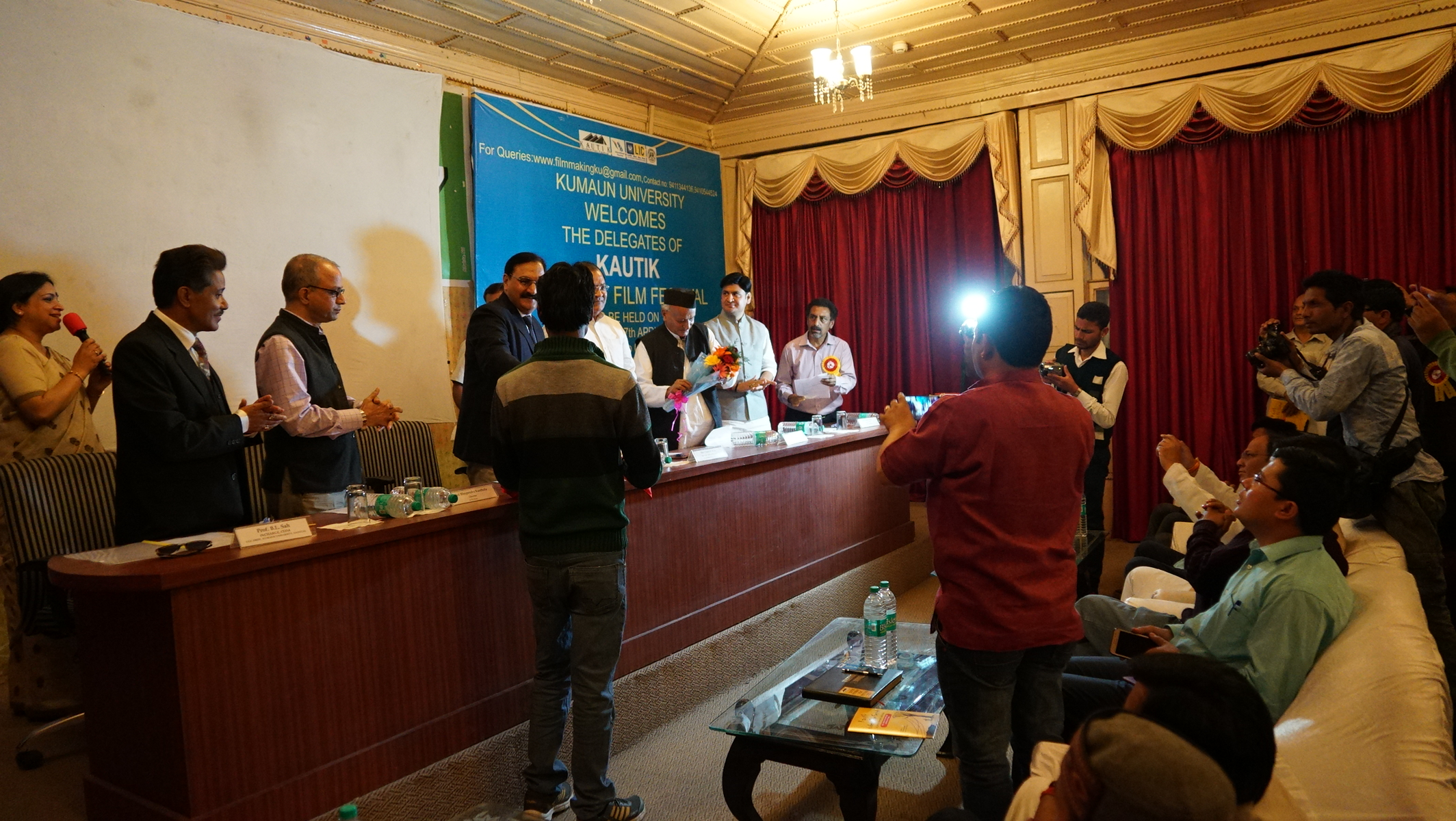
FTII director Bhupendra Kainthola, festival director Rajesh Shah, et al., at the launch of Kautik Student Film Festival.

Shah started her filmmaking career as an assistant director to Saeed Akhtar Mirza on Naseem (1995). She subsequently worked in documentary filmmaking, directing From the Land of Buddhism to the Land of Buddha (2000), which won the National Film Award for Best Historical Reconstruction/Compilation Film at the 48th National Film Awards. The documentary was also selected for the Message to Man International Film Festival in St. Petersburg, Russia. Her other documentary works include Drishti Anant and Parvat Se Parvat Tak.

Shah made her feature-film directorial debut with Samosa & Sons, a Hindi-language social satire written by Deepak Tiruwa and featuring Sanjay Mishra, Brijendra Kala and Jeetu Shastri. The film was shot in Uttarakhand during the COVID-19 pandemic and premiered in Mumbai in 2021.

Shah also has served as a jury member for the National Film Awards and the International Film Festival of India. She founded Akriti Productions, served on the faculty of Kumaun University and became artistic director of the Kautik International Film Festival in Nainital.

== Awards ==
She is Recipient of the 2000 National Film Award for Best Historical Reconstruction/Compilation Film for her film From the land of Buddhism to the Land of Buddha (2000). Citation: "For its realistic and pictorial depiction of the culture, traditions and socio-economic conditions of the Tibetans settled in India."

== Member of the Jury ==
- 49th National Film Awards
- IFFI-2005
- Chalachitram National Film Festival-2020
