= Siladitya Sen =

Siladitya Sen is an Indian film -critic, -analyst, -journalist, -jury member, based in Kolkata. He writes for the Bengali newspaper, Anandabazar Patrika.

== Jury member ==
- National Film Award for Best Writing on Cinema
- FCCI Award for Best Debut Film at HBFF
- Mumbai International Film Festival

== Books ==
- Co-author, Indian Film Culture: Indian Cinema
- Author, Mrinal Sener Film Jatra
