= Madhu Eravankara =

Indian film Director

- Born: Madhusudanan Unnithan; 20-05-1954; Eravankara
- Education: Bishop Moore College, Mavelikara; N.S.S.College, Pandalam and Madurai Kamraj University
- Occupations: Film director, film critic, film scholar, author and film teacher
- Spouse: Usha.S
- Children: Ardra Maanasi, Ananthu Madhav
- Writing career
- Language: Malayalam, English
- Period: 1974-76; 1992-94
- Subjects: Chemistry, Journalism & Mass Communication
- Notable works: Malayala Cinemayum Sahityavum, Indian Cinema 100 Years 100 Cinema, Nishadam, Punarjjani, Punarakhyanam
- Notable awards: National Film Award with President's Gold Medal, Mami Award

Madhu Eravankara is a film director, film critic, film scholar, film jury, film teacher, and author. He was born in Eravankara in Alappuzha District, Kerala, India.

== Filmmaker ==
He has directed the feature film Nankooram and around thirty documentaries including Nishadam (IFFK-2004, CFF-2004, DFF-2004 & BIFF- 2005),

== See also ==
- Film Critics Circle of India
- FIPRESCI
