= Utpal Datta =

Indian film critic

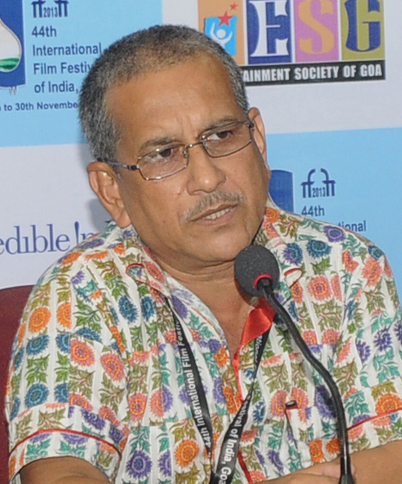
- Utpal Datta addressing a press conference in 2013
- Citizenship: Indian
- Education: Gauhati University
- Writing career
- Language: Assamese
- Notable awards: Special Jury Mention for Book on Cinema at the 54th National Film Awards

Utpal Datta is an Indian film critic from Guwahati. He was awarded the National Film Award for Best Critic in 2023. Previously, he was awarded the Jury Special Mention for Best Writing in Cinema in 2006.

== Career ==
Utpal Datta earned his Masters in Arts from Gauhati University. He later joined ⠀⠀All India Radio, Guwahati, where his book 24 Frames (2008), an anthology of articles on Indian cinema, was released as a radio program. His short feature film Bohubritta (Circles, 2019) has been screened at several International Film Festivals.

== Books ==
=== Author ===
- Chalachitra (1996 in Assamese)
- Kālasandhyā (2007)(কালসন্ধ্যা in Assamese)
- 24 Frames (2008)
- Mantra Mugdha (2020) https://www.google.co.in/books/edition/MANTRA_MUGDHA/tuoGEAAAQBAJ?hl=en&gbpv=0
- Film Appreciation (2021)
- The Last Signature of Mozart (2024)
- Aparupa Andaman
- Maramar Neha
- CineQuiz
- Chalachitra - Articles on film aesthetics 24 Frames
- Ki Naam ai premor
- Mantramugdha
- Chalachitrar Rasaswadan
- Kapurusor Tarowal
- Asomiya Cinemar Ati Adhyai
- Decoding Films
- Bhabendra Nath Saikiar Chitranatya

=== Editor ===
- Aamar Chinaki Tachadduk (1982 in Assamese)
- Chalachitra Katha
- Bata Bijayi Lekhakar Galpa
- Ganje Fariste
- Chalachitra - Samoi, Samaj, Nandantatwa

=== Translator ===
- Girish Karnad's Tughlak and Nagamandala
- Dr. Dipak Chandra's Duryodhan
- Narendra Modi's Ailoi cithi
- K. Satchidanandan's Matra ata sparsatei barasun diya megh
- K. Satchidanandan's Herai jowa bastubor
- Dr. Ratan Bhattacharya's Raktakta burburanir Mmalita

== Films ==
- By Lane 2 (2013)
- Through Trust and Fear
- Borgeet- Eti Dhrupadi Ratna
- Bohubritta (2019)
- Fagu Khele Karunamoi
- Harinarayan

== Awards and recognition ==
- Special Jury Mention for Book on Cinema at the 54th National Film Awards
- Swarna Kamal, Best Writing in Cinema at 71st National Film Award
- Amulya Manna Photography Award 2025
