= Muslim social =

Film genre in Bollywood

The Muslim social is a film genre in Hindi cinema that focuses on the depiction of Islamic culture and traditions in India. It flourished in the 1950s and 1960s and lasted till the early 1980s. These films are characterised by the use of ghazals, qawwalis, Urdu poetry, and other musical forms associated with Islamic cultural heritage.

The genre is broadly categorised into two types: "classic Muslim socials," which explore nawabi culture and the lives of upper-class or elite Muslim families, and "new wave Muslim socials," which highlight the experiences of middle-class Muslim families, addressing themes such as economic challenges, social discrimination, and communal violence. The term "Muslim social" has been a subject of criticism for its potential to marginalise and compartmentalise films centered on Islamic culture. Filmmaker M. S. Sathyu, director of Garm Hava (1973), questioned the use of such labels, noting the absence of equivalent terms like "Hindu social" or "Christian social" in cinema. On the other hand Nadira Khatun, an associate profess at XIM University, thinks that Muslim Social genre is simply "a subsection of the broader genre ‘The Social’, wherein films showcase everyday household narratives and romantic tales".

== History ==
The earliest Muslim socials were made in the 1930s after the advent of sound and continued to be popular until the 1980s. The genre's popularity was partly due to the financial success of Mehboob Khan's Najma (1943), which became the blueprint for Muslim socials that followed, which too delved on social issues around Muslim families, no matter what the setting, giving the genre its title.

Based on the life of Mughal Emperor, Jahangir, Pukar (1939) made by Sohrab Modi, known for his historicals, is the first notable film in this genre. Soon Hindi cinema based in Mumbai became the hub for Muslim socials, and it employed a large number of Muslim producers, director, screenwriters, music directors, lyricists and actors, most notably Mehboob Khan, K. A. Abbas, Kamal Amrohi, Abrar Alvi, Abdul Rashid Kardar, Saadat Hassan Manto, Ismat Chugtai, Ghulam Haider, Khayyam, Sahir Ludhianvi, Majrooh Sultanpuri, Shakeel Badayuni, Mohammed Rafi, Talat Mahmood, Shamshad Begum. Numerous films were made about the Mughals, including Humayun (1945) by Mehboob Khan, Shahjehan (1946) by Abdul Rashid Kardar, Taj Mahal (1963) by M. Sadiq, and Jahan Ara (1964), however the pinnacle of this royalty theme was Mughal-e-Azam (1960) by K. Asif, about Akbar, his son Prince Salim (later known as Jahangir), and the courtesan Anarkali, who itself became the theme of other films, like Anarkali (1953). Another popular theme of the period was centered on the nawabi culture, especially the culture of Awadh, present day Lucknow, it produced films marked by elaborate production, music and highlighting the sophistication of language and lifestyle, like Mirza Ghalib (1954), Chaudhvin Ka Chand (1960), Mere Mehboob (1963), Dil Hi To Hai (1963) and Pakeezah (1972) by Kamal Amrohi, starring Meena Kumari, which spent over a decade in making.

Thereafter the films in this genre shifted from regal that of fading Nawabi culture - Bahu Begum (1967). After experiencing its height in the 1970s, the genre descended to being a mere stereotypical and kitschy representation complete a kotha of a courtesan or a nawab stricken with poverty. One exception was Umrao Jaan (1981) directed by Muzaffar Ali based on 1905 historical novel Umrao Jaan Ada by Mirza Hadi Ruswa.

Musical romances were also prepared in this genre which included H. S. Rawail's Mere Mehboob (1963), Mehboob Ki Mehndi (1971) and Laila Majnu (1976). More over reflecting on the changing times, themes shifted regal to middle class North Indian Muslims, and from mainstream Bollywood to parallel cinema or the new wave cinema, starting with Dastak (1970), Garm Hava (1973), Bazaar (1982) and Nikaah (1982). Besides that Ali made Anjuman (1986), and Saeed Akhtar Mirza made Salim Langde Pe Mat Ro (1989) and Naseem (1995). Gradually the genre lost both nuanced depiction of its hey days was imitated by the cinema many Muslim countries, and audiences as well, and few notable additions were made to this genre, and too sporadic.

The genre resurfaced in works of the screenwriter Khalid Mohammed, Mammo (1994), Sardari Begum (1996), Fiza (2000) and Zubeidaa (2001), Mohammed directed Fiza, while the rest were directed by art film master Shyam Benegal, Benegal had previously directed, and Junoon (1978) set in the Indian Rebellion of 1857, stories with marked political content. Among recent movies, it is often wondered, should Gangs of Wasseypur (2012) be added to this glorious list of "Muslim Social" Genre, which may also be considered reflective of the current politico-social milieu of Muslims in India.

== Examples ==
=== Classic Muslim socials ===
- Pukar (1939)
- Qaidi (1940)
- Najma (1943)
- Elaan (1947)
- Mirza Ghalib (1954)
- Chaudhvin Ka Chand (1960)
- Mere Mehboob (1963)
- Dil Hi To Hai (1963)
- Benazir (1964)
- Gazal (1964)
- Neend Hamari Khwab Tumhare (1966)
- Palki (1967)
- Bahu Begum (1967)
- Mere Huzoor (1968)
- Mehboob Ki Mehndi (1971)
- Pakeezah (1972)
- Laila Majnu (1976)
- Junoon (1978)
- Umrao Jaan (1981)

=== New wave Muslim socials ===
- Dastak (1970)
- Garm Hava (1973)
- Bazaar (1982)
- Nikaah (1982)
- Coolie (1983)
- Anjuman (1986)
- Tawaif (1985)
- Salim Langde Pe Mat Ro (1989)
- Sanam Bewafa (1991)
- Bewaffa Se Waffa (1992)
- Mammo (1994)
- Naseem (1995)
- Sardari Begum (1996)
- Fiza (2000)
- Tehzeeb (2003)
- My Name Is Khan (2010)
- Gali Gulieyan (2017)
- Mulk (2018)
- Single Salma (2025)
- Haq (2025)
- The Great Shamsuddin Family (2025)

== Examples from Pakistani cinema ==
- Kismet (1956)
- Eid Mubarak (1965)

== Bibliography ==
- Malise. Ruthven; Azim A. Nanji (2004). Historical Atlas of Islam. Harvard University Press. p. 189. ISBN 0674013859. "muslim social film."
- Gulzar; Govind Nihalani; Saibal Chatterjee (2003). Encyclopaedia of Hindi cinema. Popular Prakashan. ISBN 81-7991-066-0.
- Shvetal Vyas. "The disappearance of Muslim socials". University of South Australia.
- Rachel Dwyer (2006). "3. the Islamicate Cinema". Filming the Gods: Religion and Indian Cinema. Routledge. ISBN 0203088654.
