= Kaifi Azmi =

Indian Urdu poet (1919–2002)

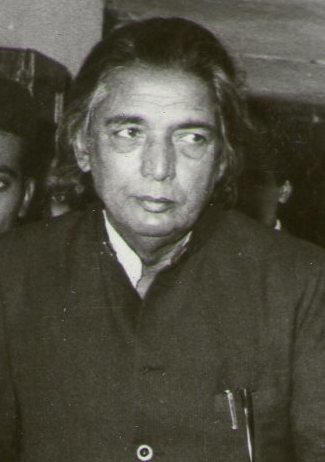
- Azmi in 1983
- Born: Athar Husain Rizvi; 14 January 1919; Mijwan, United Provinces of Agra and Oudh, British India (present-day Uttar Pradesh, India)
- Died: 10 May 2002 (aged 83); Mumbai, Maharashtra, India
- Occupations: Poet; Film Lyricist; Film Story Writer; Screenwriter; Film Dialgoue Writer; Actor
- Political party: Communist Party of India
- Spouse: Shaukat Kaifi (m. 1947)
- Children: Shabana Azmi; Baba Azmi
- Awards: National Film Award for Best Lyrics (1970); Padma Shri (1974); Sahitya Akademi Award (1975); Sahitya Akademi Fellow (2002)
- Website: azmikaifi.com

Kaifi Azmi (born Athar Husain Rizvi; 14 January 1919 – 10 May 2002) was an Indian Urdu poet, film lyricist, story writer, screenwriter, dialogue writer and actor. He is remembered as the one who brought Urdu literature to Indian motion pictures. Together with Pirzada Qasim, Jaun Elia and others he participated in many memorable Mushaira gatherings of the twentieth century. He was also a communist who wanted to see India one day become a socialist state. His wife was theatre and film actress Shaukat Kaifi.

== Biography ==
=== Early life ===
Azmi was born into a family in the village of Mijwan in Azamgarh district of Uttar Pradesh. He got his title from the city of the same name.

=== Family ===
He was from a family of artists. His three brothers were also shayars (poets). Azmi was married to Shaukat Azmi. They have a daughter, Shabana Azmi who is an actress, and a son, Baba Azmi, a cinematographer. Azmi's daughter-in-law Tanvi Azmi is also an actress.

During Partition, he was underground in Aurangabad, as he was hounded by the British police for being a "card-carrying communist". His parents and his five brothers took the ship from Bombay to Karachi. By the time he surfaced, their ship had left.

He was denied a visa for Pakistan for several years despite the fact that his family lived there, because he was a communist.

== Career ==
=== Writings ===
At age eleven, Azmi wrote his first ghazal in Bahraich Itna To Zindagi Mein Kisi Ki Khalal Pade and somehow managed to get himself invited to a mushaira and over there, he recited a ghazal, rather a couplet of the ghazal which was very much appreciated by the president of the mushaira, Mani Jaisi, but most of the people, including his father, thought he recited his elder brother's ghazal. When his elder brother denied it, his father and his clerk decided to test his poetic talent. They gave him one of the lines of a couplet and asked him to write a ghazal in the same meter and rhyme. Azmi accepted the challenge and completed a ghazal. This particular ghazal was to become a rage in undivided India and it was immortalised as it was sung by legendary ghazal singer, Begum Akhtar. Azmi abandoned his studies of Persian and Urdu during the Quit India agitations in 1942 and shortly thereafter became a full-time Marxist when he accepted membership of the Communist Party of India in 1943. During this period, the leading progressive writers of Lucknow noticed him. They were very impressed by his leadership qualities. They also saw in him a budding poet and extended all possible encouragement to him. Consequently, Azmi started to win great acclaim as a poet and became a member of Progressive Writers' Movement of India. At the age of twenty-four, he started activities in the textile mill areas of Kanpur. As a full-time worker, he left his life of comfort, though he was the son of a zamindar. He was asked to shift his base to Bombay, work amongst the workers and start party work with a lot of zeal and enthusiasm.

=== Poetry ===
Kar chale hum fida jan-o-tan sathion
ab tumhare hawale watan sathio
zinda rahne ki mausam bahut hai magar
jan dene ki rut roz ati nahi
husn aur ishq dono ko ruswa kare
wo jawani jo khu me nahati nahi
aaj dharti bani hai dulhan sathio
Kar Chale hum Fida Jaan-o-Tan Sathio

Kaifi Azmi

I sacrifice now, this life and body, o friends...
the nation is in your hands now, o friends...
so many seasons are there to live, but...
the season to give up one's life doesn't come often, ...
leaving behind both, the beauty & the love,
of what value is that youth, which doesn't bathe in blood...
today the earth has become my bride, o friends
I sacrifice now, this body and life, o friends...

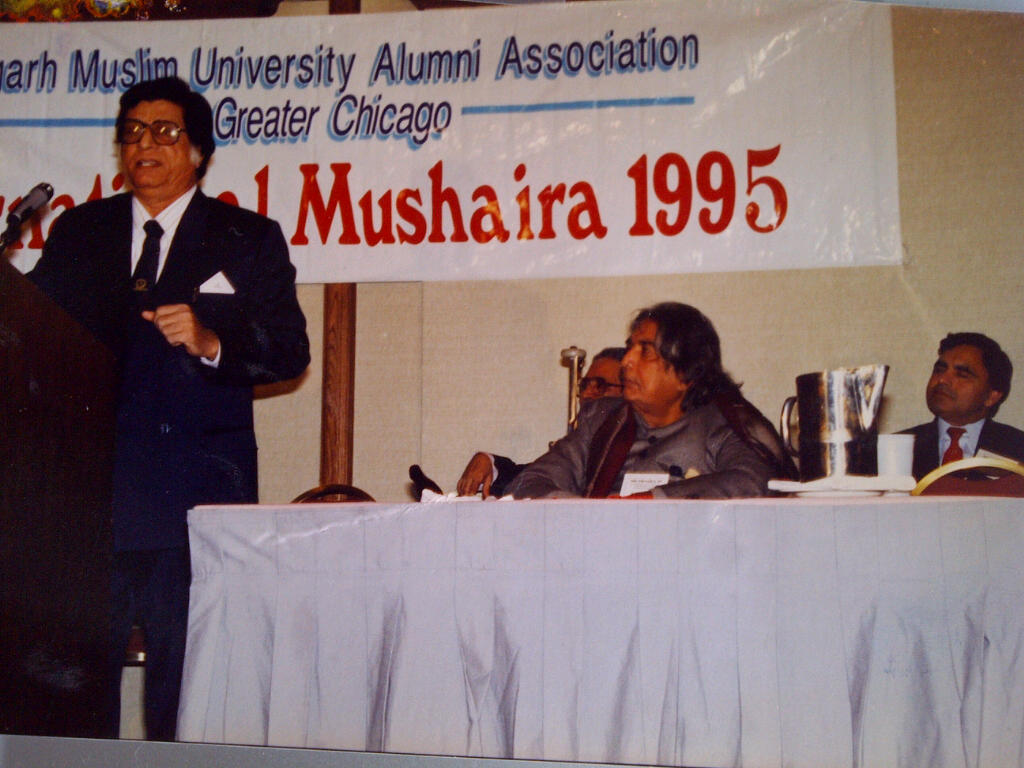
Syed Mahmood Khundmiri introducing Kaifi Azami in Annual Mushaira in Chicago.

Like most of the Urdu poets, Azmi began as a ghazal writer, cramming his poetry with the repeated themes of love and romance in a style that was replete with clichés and metaphors. However, his association with the Progressive Writers' Movement and Communist Party made him embark on the path of socially conscious poetry. In his poetry, he highlights the exploitation of the subaltern masses and through them he conveys a message of the creation of a just social order by dismantling the existing one. Yet, his poetry cannot be called plain propaganda. It has its own merits; intensity of emotions, in particular, and the spirit of sympathy and compassion towards the disadvantaged section of society, are the hallmark of his poetry. His poems are also notable for their rich imagery and in this respect, his contribution to Urdu poetry can hardly be overstated. Azmi's first collection of poems, Jhankar was published in 1943.

In 1944, he wrote a poem Ab Agli Id Ek Azad Pakistan Main Hogi — one of the works written by leading Progressive Writers of Urdu campaigning for Pakistan — although he later became bitter about the partition.

His important works including anthologies of poetry, were Aakhir-e-Shab, Sarmaya, Awaara Sajde, Kaifiyaat, Nai Gulistan, an anthology of articles he wrote for Urdu Blitz, Meri Awaaz Suno, a selection of his film lyrics, and the script of Heer Raanjha in Devanagari. His lyrics titled "Kar chale hum fida" featured in the soundtrack of the 1964 Hindi film Haqeeqat.

His best known poems are Aurat, Makaan, Daaera, Sanp, and Bahuroopni.

=== Films ===
Azmi's work in films includes working as a lyricist, writer, and actor. Azmi wrote his first lyrics for the film Buzdil, directed by Shaheed Latif and music by SD Burman, released in 1951. His early work as a writer was mainly for Nanubhai Vakil's films like Yahudi Ki Beti (1956), Parvin (1957), Miss Punjab Mail (1958) and Id Ka Chand (1964). While directors like Khwaja Ahmad Abbas and Bimal Roy strove to create the "New Cinema", writers like Sahir Ludhianvi, Jan Nisar Akhtar, Majrooh Sultanpuri, and Kaifi changed the tenor and vocabulary of the Hindi film song, creating a fresh new wave in Hindi film lyrics that lasted many years. His greatest feat as a writer was Chetan Anand's Heer Raanjha (1970) wherein the entire dialogue of the film was in verse. It was a tremendous achievement and one of the greatest feats of Hindi film writing. Azmi also won great critical accolades for the script, dialogues and lyrics of M.S. Sathyu's Garam Hawa (1973), based on a story by Ismat Chughtai. Azmi also wrote the dialogues for Shyam Benegal's Manthan (1976) and Sathyu's Kanneshwara Rama (1977). As a lyricist and songwriter, though he wrote for numerous films, he will always be remembered for Guru Dutt's Kaagaz Ke Phool (1959) and Chetan Anand's Haqeeqat (1964), India's greatest war film. Some notables films for which he wrote lyrics include Kohra (1964), Anupama (1966), Uski Kahani (1966), Saat Hindustani (1969), Shola Aur Shabnam, Parwana (1971), Bawarchi (1972), Pakeezah (1972), Hanste Zakhm (1973), Arth (1982) and Razia Sultan (1983). For Naunihal (1967), he wrote the song "Meri Aawaz Suno Pyar ka Raaz Suno" (Hear my voice, hear the secret of love) sung by Mohammad Rafi. The song is picturised over the funeral procession of Prime Minister of India, Jawahar Lal Nehru. Years later, after Azmi's own death his daughter, Shabana Azmi mentioned finding comfort in verses from the song. Azmi wrote the lyrics for Bible Ki Kahaniyan, the first Christian mythological television show broadcast in India. He also played a memorable role of Naseem's grandfather in Naseem (1995). Azmi died on 10 May 2002 at around the age of eighty-three. He was survived by his wife, daughter, and son. His autobiography is included in a collection of his works, Aaj Ke Prashid Shayar: Kaifi Azmi.

== Filmography ==
=== Actor ===
Year	Film	Role
1982	Yeh Nazdeekiyan	
1995	Naseem	Naseem's Grandfather

=== Story Writer ===
Year	Film	Notes
1956	Alam Ara	
1957	Sati Pariksha	
1973	Garm Hava	Co-written with Ismat Chugtai and Shama Zaidi.
1975	Sankalp	

=== Screenwriter ===
Year	Film	Notes
1958	Lala Rookh	
1973	Garm Hava	Co-written with Shama Zaidi.
1973	Naina	Co-written with Kanak Mishra.

=== Dialogue Writer ===
Year	Film	Notes
1956	Heer	
1961	Shama	
1966	Dak Ghar	
1966	Uski Kahani	
1970	Heer Raanjha	Wrote the film's dialogues entirely in verse.
1972	Rivaaj	
1973	Alam Ara	
1973	Garm Hava	
1973	Naina	
1976	Manthan	
1977	Dil Aur Patthar	

=== Lyricist ===
Year	Film	Songs written	Music Director(s)	Notes
1951	Buzdil	At most 3	Sachin Dev Burman	Debut film
1952	Bahu Beti	7	Shiv Dayal Batish	One of Azmi's songs "Mose Chanchal Jawaani Sambhaal Nahin Jaaye..." sung by Geeta Dutt was removed from the film due to Censor Board's objection.
1954	Gul Bahar	1	Dhaniram	
1955	Hatimtai Ki Beti	2	Allah Rakha Qureshi	
1955	Naata	1	Mohinder Singh Sarna	
1955	Sakhi Hatim	At least 5	Allah Rakha Qureshi	
1955	Shahi Chor	1	Dhaniram	
1956	Lal-E-Yaman	6	Allah Rakha Qureshi	
1956	Sultana Daku	2	Bipin-Babul	
1956	Yahudi Ki Beti	6	Kamal Mitra	
1956	Zindagi	7	Mohammed Shafi Nagri Niyazi	
1957	Jannat	6 (All)	Husnlal-Bhagatram	
1958	Chandu	1	Bipin-Babul	
1958	Sone Ki Chidiya		Omkar Prasad Nayyar	
1958	Lala Rookh	7 (All)	Mohammed Zahur Khayyam Hashmi	
1958	Panchayat	1	Iqbal Qureshi	
1959	40 Days	8 (All)	Babul Bose	
1959	Kaagaz Ke Phool	6	Sachin Dev Burman	One of Kaifi Azmi's songs, "Waqt Ne Kiya Kya Haseen Sitam..." sung by Geeta Dutt was not part of the film's original script. Sachin Dev Burman had composed its tune without a brief. When Guru Dutt and Kaifi Azmi heard the tune they loved it. Dutt asked Kaifi to write the lyrics for the song and said that he would find a way to accommodate it in the film. Burman brought in Sebastian D'Souza, who wasn't a regular member of his team, to arrange this song.
1960	Apna Haath Jagannath	8 (All)	Sachin Dev Burman	
1960	Ek Ke Baad Ek	7 (All)	Sachin Dev Burman	
1961	Razia Sultana	2	Lachhiram Tamar	
1961	Shama	12 (All)	Ghulam Mohammed	
1961	Shola Aur Shabnam	At most 3	Mohammed Zahur Khayyam Hashmi	
1962	Bijli Chamke Jamuna Paar	9 (All)	Shri Nath Tripathi	
1962	Gyara Hazar Ladkian	2	Dattaram Baburao Naik	
1962	Nakli Nawab	4	Babul Bose	
1964	Haqeeqat	7 (All)	Madan Mohan Kohli	
1964	Idd Ka Chand	8	Allah Rakha Qureshi	
1964	Kohraa	5 (All)	Hemant Kumar	This film was originally titled Sharmila.
1964	Main Suhagan Hoon	4	Lachhiram Tamar	
1965	Alor Pipasa	4	Hemant Kumar	It is a Bengali film in which he wrote the Hindi songs.
1965	Do Dil	7 (All)	Hemant Kumar	
1965	Faraar	6 (All)	Hemant Kumar	
1966	Anupama	5 (All)	Hemant Kumar	
1966	Aakhri Khat	5 (All)	Mohammed Zahur Khayyam Hashmi	
1966	Baharen Phir Bhi Aayengi	2	Omkar Prasad Nayyar	
1966	Dak Ghar	6 (All)	Madan Mohan Kohli	The film featured songs but did not have a music release.
1966	Uski Kahani	2 (All)	Kanu Roy	
1967	Ghar Ka Chirag	6 (All)	Madan Mohan Kohli	
1967	Mera Bhai Mera Dushmun	At least 1	Mohammed Zahur Khayyam Hashmi	
1967	Naunihal	7 (All)	Madan Mohan Kohli	
1968	Anokhi Raat	1	Roshan Lal Nagrath	
1969	Saat Hindustani	1 (All)	Jag Phool Kaushik	
1969	Satyakam	3 (All)	Laxmikant-Pyarelal	
1970	Dagabaz	1	Dilip Dholakia	
1970	Hamara Adhikar	6 (All)	Chitragupta Srivastava	The film was initially titled Baap Bahu Aur Beta.
1970	Heer Raanjha	8 (All)	Madan Mohan Kohli	He also wrote dialogues for the film, entirely in verse. This was one of the few films in which he and his wife, actress Shaukat Kaifi, worked together.
1970	Maa Ka Aanchal	6 (All)	Madan Mohan Kohli	
1970	Mahraja	2	Madan Mohan Kohli	
1970	Saat Phere	6	Sudhir Sain	
1971	Chhoti Bahu	1	Kalyanji-Anandji	
1971	Do Boond Pani	5	Jaidev Verma	
1971	Parwana	6 (All)	Madan Mohan Kohli	
1971	Saaz Aur Sanam	5 (All)	Chitragupta Srivastava	
1971	Shan-E-Khuda	3	Iqbal Qureshi	
1972	Bawarchi	6 (All)	Madan Mohan Kohli	While Kaifi Azmi wrote all the songs of this film, some of the lines in the song, "Bhor Aayi, Gaya Aandiara..." sung by Harindranath Chatterjee, Manna Dey, Nirmala Devi, Kishore Kumar and Lakshmi Shankar, were also written by Harindranath Chatterjee and Gulzar though they were not credited for it.
1972	Mangetar	6 (All)	Sudhir Sain	
1972	Pakeezah	1	Ghulam Mohammed	The film was in the making for several years.
1972	Rivaaj	1	Shankar-Jaikishan	
1972	Shair-E-Kashmir Mahjoor	4	Prem Dhawan	This film was launched in the mid-1960s and EP records for some of its songs were also released then. However, the film's production was delayed and it was released only in 1972.
1972	Sultana Daku	4 (All)	Madan Mohan Kohli	
1973	Alam Ara	8	Iqbal Qureshi	
1973	Hanste Zakhm	5 (All)	Madan Mohan Kohli	
1973	Hindustan Ki Kasam	4 (All)	Madan Mohan Kohli	The audio records of this film were issued in 1972 but the film was released in 1973.
1973	Naina	1	Shankar-Jaikishan	
1974	Asliyat	2 (All)	Madan Mohan Kohli	It appears that while this film had a limited release in 1974, its songs were recorded much earlier.
1974	Faslah	4 (All)	Jaidev Verma	This was the only Hindi film that featured 3 members of the Azmi family - Kaifi Azmi wrote the lyrics of the film's songs and his wife Shaukat Kaifi and daughter Shabana Azmi acted in the film.
1974	Garm Hava	2 (All)	Aziz Ahmed Khan Warsi	This film was originally titled Wahan. Its eventual title may have been inspired by Makaan, a nazm written by Kaifi Azmi. Kaifi Azmi had recited this nazm in the film Sone Ki Chidiya (1958), which was produced and written by Ismat Chughtai and featured Balraj Sahni in a leading role. The nazm, whose opening lines went "Aaj Ki Raat Bahut Garm Hava Chalti Hai / Aaj Ki Raat Na Footpath Pe Neend Aayegi / Sab Utho Main Bhi Uthoon Tum Bhi Utho Tum Bhi Utho / Koi Khidki Isi Deewaar Mein Khul Jaayegi...", was filmed on Balraj Sahni.
1975	Sankalp	5 (All)	Mohammed Zahur Khayyam Hashmi	
1977	Dhoop Chhaon	1	Shankar-Jaikishan	
1977	Dil Aur Patthar	7 (All)	Iqbal Qureshi	
1977	Kanneshwara Rama	2 (All)	B.V. Karanth	
1977	Ooparwala Jane	2	Laxmikant-Pyarelal	
1977	Shankar Husain	1	Mohammed Zahur Khayyam Hashmi	This film was a long time in the making. Its audio records were issued in 1975 but the film was released only in 1977.
1978	Subhash Chandra	4	Aparesh Lahiri	This was the Hindi-dubbed version of the 1966 Bengali film of the same title.
1978	Toote Khilone	7 (All)	Bappi Lahiri	The audio records of this film were issued in 1977 but the film was released in 1978.
1979	Inspector Eagle	3 (All)	Madan Mohan Kohli	This film was in the making for a few years.
1980	Angaar	2	Sonik-Omi	
1980	Shaitan Mujrim	1	Ratandeep-Hemraj	The audio records of this film were issued in 1979 but the film was released in 1980.
1981	Aakhri Mujra	1	Kalyanji-Anandji	
1982	Arth	3	Jagjit Singh and Chitra Singh	The film's opening credits and its publicity material attributed the film's music to Jagjit Singh and Chitra Singh. However, the film's audio release credited only Jagjit Singh.
1982	Deedar-E-Yaar	At most 3	Laxmikant-Pyarelal	
1982	Lakshmi	2	Usha Khanna	
1982	Suraag	6 (All)	Bappi Lahiri	
1982	Yeh Nazdeekiyan	1	Raghunath Seth	Kaifi Azmi had an acting role in this film. His daughter, Shabana Azmi, played a lead role in the film.
1983	Kahaan Tak Aasmaan Hai	7 (All)	Raghunath Seth	
1983	Razia Sultan	1	Mohammed Zahur Khayyam Hashmi	This film was in the making for seven years.
1984	Bhavna	5 (All)	Bappi Lahiri	
1984	Hum Rahe Na Hum	6 (All)	Bappi Lahiri	
1985	Ek Pal	2	Bhupen Hazarika	
1986	Mere Saath Chal	1	Hridaynath Mangeshkar	
1986	Nasihat	1	Kalyanji-Anandji	
1986	Shart	3	Bappi Lahiri	
1989	Main Azaad Hoon	1 (All)	Amar-Utpal	This was the only film of actress Shabana Azmi that also featured her husband as well as her father. Her husband Javed Akhtar wrote the film and her father Kaifi Azmi wrote the lyrics of the only song in the film. This film was first titled Sach and later Satyam before its final title was arrived at.
1989	Salim Langde Pe Mat Ro	1 (All)	Sharang Dev	This film featured a song but did not have an audio release.
1993	Phir Teri Kahani Yaad Aayee	2	Anu Malik	This was a made-for-TV film.
1997	Chand Grahan	4	Jaidev Verma	Ramesh Khosla had started a film with this title in 1973. Jaidev Verma had even recorded five songs for the film. However, the film could not be completed due to some reason. His son Robin Khosla then produced and directed this film using the same title. Jaidev's songs were used in this film and a new song was recorded additionally. However, it appears that even this film was never certified and released only as a telefilm.
1997	Tamanna	1	Anu Malik	
2003	Ek Alag Mausam	At most 5	Ravi Shankar Sharma	

== In media ==
Azmi was the subject of a documentary film called Diksha (2015), directed by Raman Kumar. In 1997, he recited his own poems for Kaifiyaat, an audio book on his collected works.

Kaifi Aur Mein, a play based on his life, his works and the memoir of his wife, Shaukat Azmi – Yadon Ki Rahguzar (Down Memory Lane), was written and performed by Javed Akhtar and Shabana Azmi, and performed in India as well as abroad in 2006. Another play, directed by Rani Balbir, Waqt Ne Kiya Kya Hasin Sitam, based on Kaifi Azmi's life and writings was staged in 2005, and received rave reviews.

== Awards ==
He was the recipient of Padma Shri, India's fourth-highest civilian award in 1974. Besides he was awarded the Uttar Pradesh Urdu Academy Award and the Sahitya Akademi Award for Urdu for his collection Awaara Sajde, Special Award of Maharashtra Urdu Academy, Soviet Land Nehru Award, Lotus Award from the Afro-Asian Writers' Association, and President's Award for national integration. In 1998, Government of Maharashtra conferred the Jyaneshwara Award on him. He was also honoured with the prestigious Sahitya Akademi Fellowship for lifetime achievement.

Kaifi Azmi returned his Padma Shri in the 1980s after the then Chief Minister of Uttar Pradesh Vir Bahadur Singh remarked that those speaking Urdu as a second language should be made to sit on a donkey and paraded. According to his daughter Shabana Azmi, her father replied that he had written in Urdu all his life, and if his State's Chief Minister held such views on the language, he, as a writer, must stand up for himself.

In 2000, he was conferred the first Millennium Award by the Government of Delhi and the Delhi Urdu Academy. He has also been honoured with a doctorate from Vishva Bharati University, Santiniketan.

=== Tribute ===
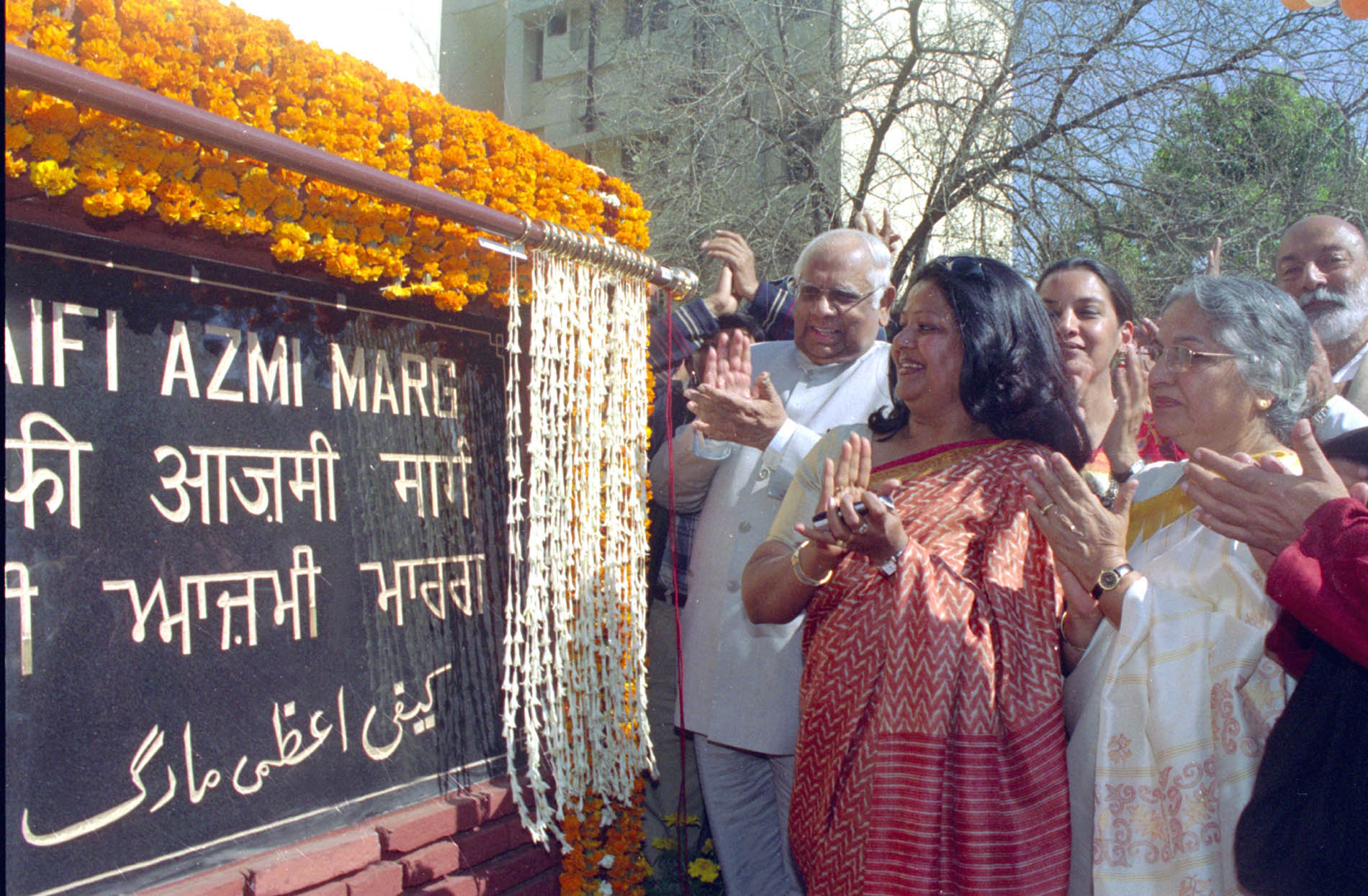
The Speaker, Lok Sabha, Shri Somnath Chatterjee at a function of renaming of the road as “Kaifi Azmi Sadak” in New Delhi on 22 February 2005

The government has also inaugurated a train named "Kaifiyat Express" which runs from his hometown Azamgarh to Old Delhi.

On 14 January 2020, search engine Google commemorated Kaifi Azmi with a Doodle on his 101st birth anniversary. Google commented: "With work ranging from passionate love poems and activist verses to Bollywood songs lyrics and screenplays, Azmi has become one of the most renowned poets of the 20th century in India, and his humanitarian efforts continue to impact people's lives today." There is street also named after him Kaifi Azmi road in Hyderabad. There is also a road in R. K. Puram, New Delhi named Kaifi Azmi Marg after him.

=== Sahitya Akademi Award ===
- 1975: Sahitya Akademi Award: Awara Sajde
- 2002: Sahitya Akademi Fellowship (Immortals of Literature)

=== National Film Awards ===
- 1970: National Film Award for Best Lyrics: Saat Hindustani
- 1973: National Film Award for Best Story: Garam Hawa (with Ismat Chughtai)

=== Filmfare Awards ===
- 1975: Filmfare Award for Best Dialogue: Garam Hawa
- 1975: Filmfare Award for Best Story: Garam Hawa (with Ismat Chughtai)
- 1975: Filmfare Award for Best Screenplay: Garam Hawa

== Select bibliography ==
- Kaifi Azmi – Fan Aur Shaqsiyat (Urdu), Mayar Publications, 2004.
- Kaifiyaat: Kulliyat-e-Kaifi Azmi (Urdu), Educational Publishing House, 2003. ISBN 978-81-87667-78-0.
- Zehr-e-Ishq (Hindi), Vani Prakashan, 2003.
- Heer Ranjha (Hindi), Vani Prakshan, 2003.
- Steel Man was Here, Penguin, 2002.
- Kaifi Azmi – Selected Poems and Life Sketch, Rajpal Publishers, 2002. ISBN 978-81-7028-395-9.
- Aaj Ke Prashid Shayar: Kaifi Azmi – Chuni Hui Shayari (Hindi), Rajpal & Sons, 2002. ISBN 978-81-7028-542-7.
- Meri Awaz Suno (Hindi), Rajkamal Prakashan, 2002.
- Nai Gulistan Vol. 1 (Hindi), Rajkamal Prakashan, 2001.
- Nai Gulistan Vol. 2 (Hindi), Rajkamal Prakashan, 2001.
- Doosra Banwas (Hindi), Diamond Pocket Books Pvt. Ltd. ISBN 978-81-288-0982-8.
- Awara Sajde (Hindi), Lokbharti Prakashan, 1995.
- Sarmaya (Urdu), Mayar Publications, 1994.
- Hoskote, Ranjit (19 May 2002). "Kaifi Azmi: Symbol of Resistance". The Hindu. Archived from the original on 17 January 2004.
- Kaifi Azmi: A Poet and a Gentleman. The Times of India, 10 May 2002.
- Kaifi Azmi: The Last Comrade-poet – Tarique Omum. The Milli Gazette. 1 June 2002.
