= Lorie (film) =

- film poster
- Directed by: Vijay Talwar
- Written by: Inayat Akhtar & Ibrahim Rangala(associate writers), Sagar Sarhadi, Bhadrakant Zaveri
- Produced by: Sagar Sarhadi
- Starring: Shabana Azmi, Farooq Shaikh, Naseeruddin Shah and Rohini Hattangadi
- Cinematography: Baba Azmi
- Music by: Khayyam
- Release date: 1984
- Country: India
- Language: Hindi

Lorie is a 1984 Bollywood drama film directed by Vijay Talwar. The film stars Shabana Azmi, Farooq Shaikh, Naseeruddin Shah and Rohini Hattangadi among others.

== Plot ==
Geeta Malhotra is depressed after she loses her child and the doctor declares that she will not be able to conceive again with her husband Bhupinder. One day she comes upon a small boy whose family has inadvertently left him behind on a city bus. She takes him home and starts treating him like her own son. She becomes obsessed with the child. Ultimately, she is arrested and stands trial for abduction.

== Cast ==
- Farooq Shaikh as Bhupinder Singh
- Naseeruddin Shah as Micky, Defence Lawyer
- Shabana Azmi as Geeta Malhotra
- Swaroop Sampat as Suman, Micky's Wife
- Rohini Hattangadi as Sharda Malhotra
- Madan Puri as Chandicharan Kapoor (father of 12 Kids)
- Shaukat Azmi as Shanti Shah
- Paresh Rawal as Prosecuting Attorney
- Yunus Parvez as Adoption Agency Head
- Sulabha Deshpande as Shanti, Domestic Maid
- Anjan Srivastav as School Administrator
- Javed Khan as Bus Conductor
- Vikas Anand as Police Inspector
- Vinod Sharma as Kakkad, Geeta's Uncle
- Kiran Vairale as Majli Kapoor, Chandicharan Kapoor's Daughter

== Songs ==
Song	Singer
"Aaja Nindiya Aaja"	Lata Mangeshkar
"Bhar Le Tumhe Baahon Mein"	Lata Mangeshkar
"Tumhi Se Roshan Hai Raat"	Asha Bhosle, Talat Aziz
"Gudiya Chidiya Chand Chakori Haathi Ghoda Dudh Katori"	Asha Bhosle, Pamela Chopra, Jagjit Kaur
