= Shaukat Kaifi =

Indian actress (1926–2019)

- Kaifi in Umrao Jaan (1981)
- Born: 21 October 1926; Hyderabad State, British India
- Died: 22 November 2019 (aged 93); Mumbai, Maharashtra, India
- Occupation: Actress
- Political party: Communist Party of India
- Spouse: Kaifi Azmi (m. 1947)
- Children: Shabana Azmi; Baba Azmi
- Relatives: Ishan Arya (nephew)
- Family: Akhtar-Azmi family

Shaukat Kaifi (21 October 1926 – 22 November 2019), also credited as Shaukat Azmi, was an Indian theater and film actress. Her husband was the Urdu poet and film lyricist, Kaifi Azmi. The couple were leading lights of the Indian People's Theatre Association (IPTA) and the Progressive Writers Association (IWA), which were the cultural platforms of the Communist Party of India.

== Biography ==
Shaukat Kaifi was born into a Uttar Pradesh migrant family in Hyderabad State. She grew up in Aurangabad, India. At a young age, she met and fell in Urdu poet Kaifi Azmi around February 1947 whom he eventually married three months later. They had two children. Their son, Baba Azmi, is a cameraman and now film director. He is married to Tanvi Azmi, the daughter of Usha Kiran, a famous actress. Shaukat and Kaifi's daughter, Shabana Azmi (b. 1950), is among the best actresses of Indian cinema. She is married to noted poet and film lyricist Javed Akhtar.

Shaukat and Kaifi, who settled in Mumbai after their wedding, endured many ups and downs in life. Kaifi was a committed member of the Communist Party, so much so that, upon his request, his party membership card was buried with him when he died.

He worked hard for the Indian People's Theatre Association (IPTA) and the Progressive Writers Association (PWA), and for many years after their wedding, his income was the meagre stipend from the Party. For many years, the couple lived with their two children in Commune accommodation provided by the Communist Party of India, which was one bedroom in an apartment shared with three other families. Since all the other families were also communists and involved with theatre or cinema, Shaukat was also bitten by the bug of theatre. Money was another incentive for her to act, and money was short for the couple after their two children began going to school.

In the mid-1950s, Kaifi began looking for work in the Mumbai film industry as a writer and lyricist. He struggled for a considerable period, writing memorable songs for films that however flopped. Kaifi then found success as a songwriter and the family fortunes took an upward turn. Within a few years, they were able to purchase an apartment in the posh Mumbai neighbourhood of Juhu. Her husband's association with the film industry helped Shaukat to take on roles in films too.

She appeared in about a dozen films, with significant roles in major productions like (Garam Hawa and Umrao Jaan). In theatre, she appeared in a dozen plays. All this she could successfully do along with her domestic duties.

After Kaifi Azmi died in 2002, Shaukat Azmi wrote an autobiography, Kaifi and I which has been adapted into an Urdu play Kaifi aur Main featuring Shabana as her mother. It premiered in Mumbai in 2006 on the 4th death anniversary of Kaifi Azmi.

== Filmography ==
| Year | Film | Role |
|---|---|---|
| 2002 | Saathiya | Bua |
| 1988 | Salaam Bombay! | Brothel owner |
| 1986 | Congregation (Anjuman) | |
| 1984 | Lorie | |
| 1982 | Bazaar | Hajan Bi |
| 1982 | Raaste Pyar Ke | Shayama's mother |
| 1981 | Umrao Jaan | Khanum Jaan |
| 1977 | Dhoop Chhaon | The Pundit's wife |
| 1974 | Faslah | Parvati S. Chandra |
| 1974 | Scorching Winds (Garam Hawa) | Jamila, Salim Mirza's wife |
| 1974 | Jurm aur Sazaa | Rajesh's Mother |
| 1974 | Woh Main Nahin | |
| 1973 | Sweekar | Susheela, Maid |
| 1973 | Naina | Shashi Kapoor's aunt |
| 1971 | Shaan E Khuda | |
| 1970 | Heer Raanjha | |
| 1964 | Haqeeqat | |
| 1964 | Kohraa | |
