= Ishan Arya =

Indian cinematographer, and producer

- Born: Hyderabad, India
- Died: 1996; Mumbai
- Other name: Irshad Ahsan
- Occupation: Cinematographer
- Years active: 1973–1987
- Spouse: Sulbha Arya
- Children: Sameer Arya, Sagar Arya
- Relatives: Srishti Behl (daughter-in-law); Shaukat Kaifi (aunt); Shabana Azmi (first-cousin); Baba Azmi (first-cousin)
- Family: Akhtar-Azmi family Behl family

Ishan Arya (born Irshad Ahsan) was an Indian cinematographer, and producer, best known as co-producer and cinematographer of Art cinema classic Garm Hava (1973). After working in theatre and advertising, he made his debut with Garm Hava directed by M. S. Sathyu. After that he worked largely in South Indian cinema, especially Telugu, though he worked on two noted Hindi art films, Bazaar (1982) directed by Sagar Sarhadi and Anjuman (1986) directed by Muzaffar Ali. At the 23rd National Film Awards, he won the Best Cinematography Award for Telugu film, Mutyala Muggu (1975).

== Personal life ==
He was born as Irshad Ahsan in 1942 and is a nephew of Shaukat Kaifi and first cousin of Shabana Azmi. He changed his name to Ishan Arya after marrying actress Sulbha Arya according to Arya Samaj rites. Their son Sameer Arya (married to Srishti Behl, the daughter of Ramesh Behl) is also a cinematographer, known for films like Koyla (1997), Koi... Mil Gaya (2003) and Shootout at Wadala (2013). Their other son Sagar Arya is an actor and voice over artist, married to Anwesha Bhattacharya, the daughter of Rinki and film director Basu Bhattacharya.

Cinematographer Baba Azmi who is Arya's first cousin, started his career assisting Arya in Telugu films in the 1970s, starting as light boy, he worked with Arya for 10–12 Telugu films.

== Filmography ==
=== Producer ===
- Garm Hava (1973, Hindi)
- Rusthum Jodi (1980, Kannada)

=== Cinematographer ===
- Garm Hava (1973, Hindi)
- Mutyala Muggu (1975, Telugu)
- Khoon Pasina (1977, Hindi)
- Kakana Kote (1977, Kannada)
- Gorantha Deepam (1978, Telugu)
- Bazaar (1982, Hindi)
- Mumbaicha Faujdar (1984, Marathi)
- Anjuman (1986, Hindi)
- Aaj Jhale Mukt Mi (1986, Marathi)
- Kahan Kahan Se Guzar Gaya (1986, Hindi)
- Nasihat (1986, Hindi)
- Mohre (1987, Hindi)
- Toorpu Velle Railu (1979, Telugu)
