= D.N. Nagar =

D N Nagar डी एन नगर
- Neighbourhood
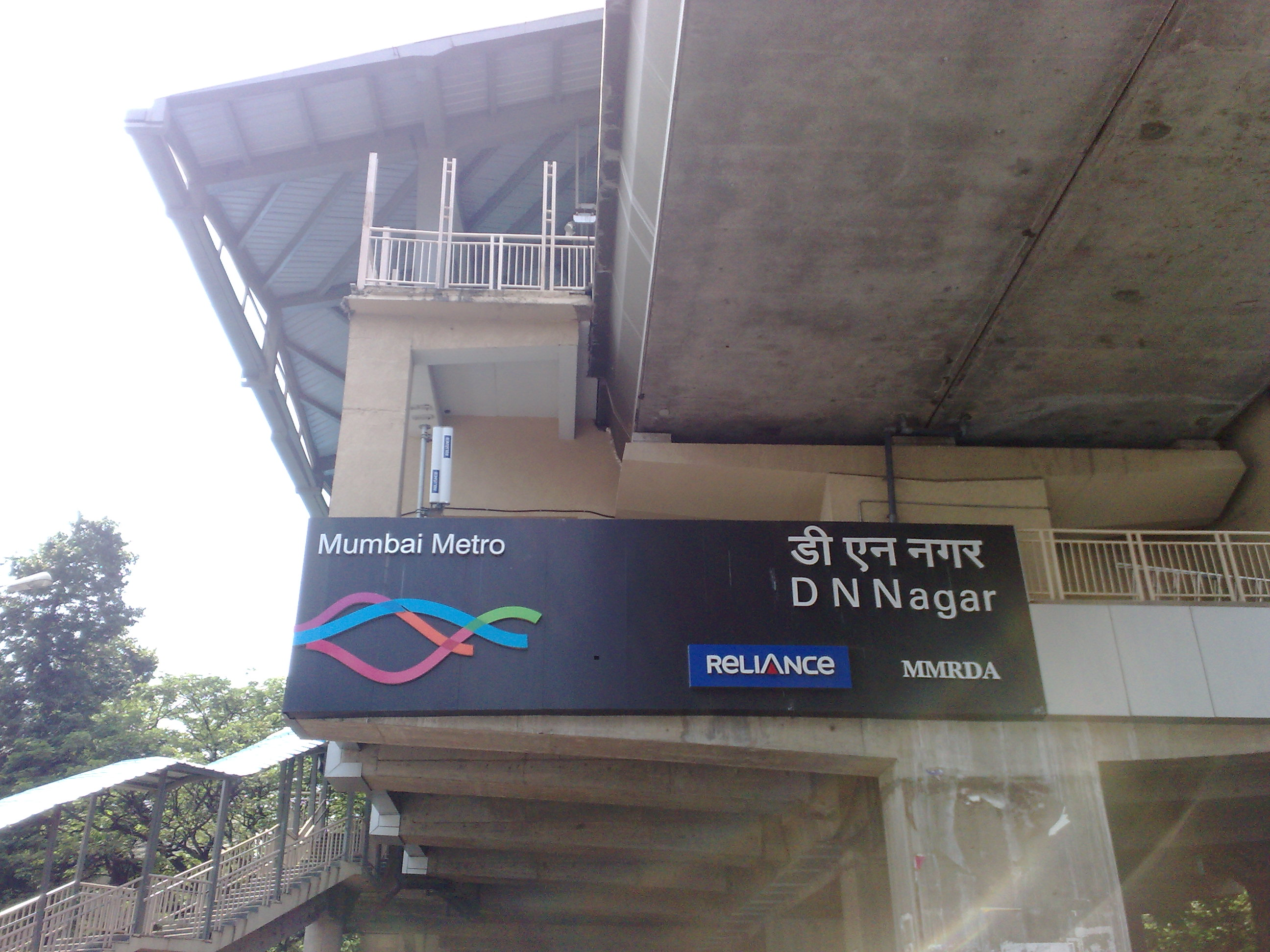
- D N Nagar metro station

- Location within Mumbai
- Coordinates: 19.124085°N 72.831373°E
- Country: India
- State: Maharashtra
- District: Mumbai Suburban
- City: Mumbai

Government
  - Type: Municipal Corporation
  - Body: Brihanmumbai Municipal Corporation (MCGM)

Languages
  - Official: Marathi
- Time zone: UTC+5:30 (IST)
- PIN: 400053
- Area code: 022
- Vehicle registration: MH 02
- Civic agency: BMC

D N Nagar is named after Dadabhai Naoroji. It is located within the triangle of Lokhandwala Complex, Seven Bungalows and Juhu Vile Parle Development Scheme (JVPD).

Its educational establishments include Bhavan's College, Bhavan's A H Wadia High School, Bhavan's Sardar Patel College of Engineering, Bhavan's S P Jain Institute of Management, S C D Barfivala High School, Valia College and Pragat Vidya Mandir.

D N Nagar is now accessible with Mumbai Metro which has an elevated station with the same name, located at India Oil Junction.

== See also ==
- Four Bungalows
- Seven Bungalows
