= Chikankari =

Traditional embroidery style from Lucknow, India

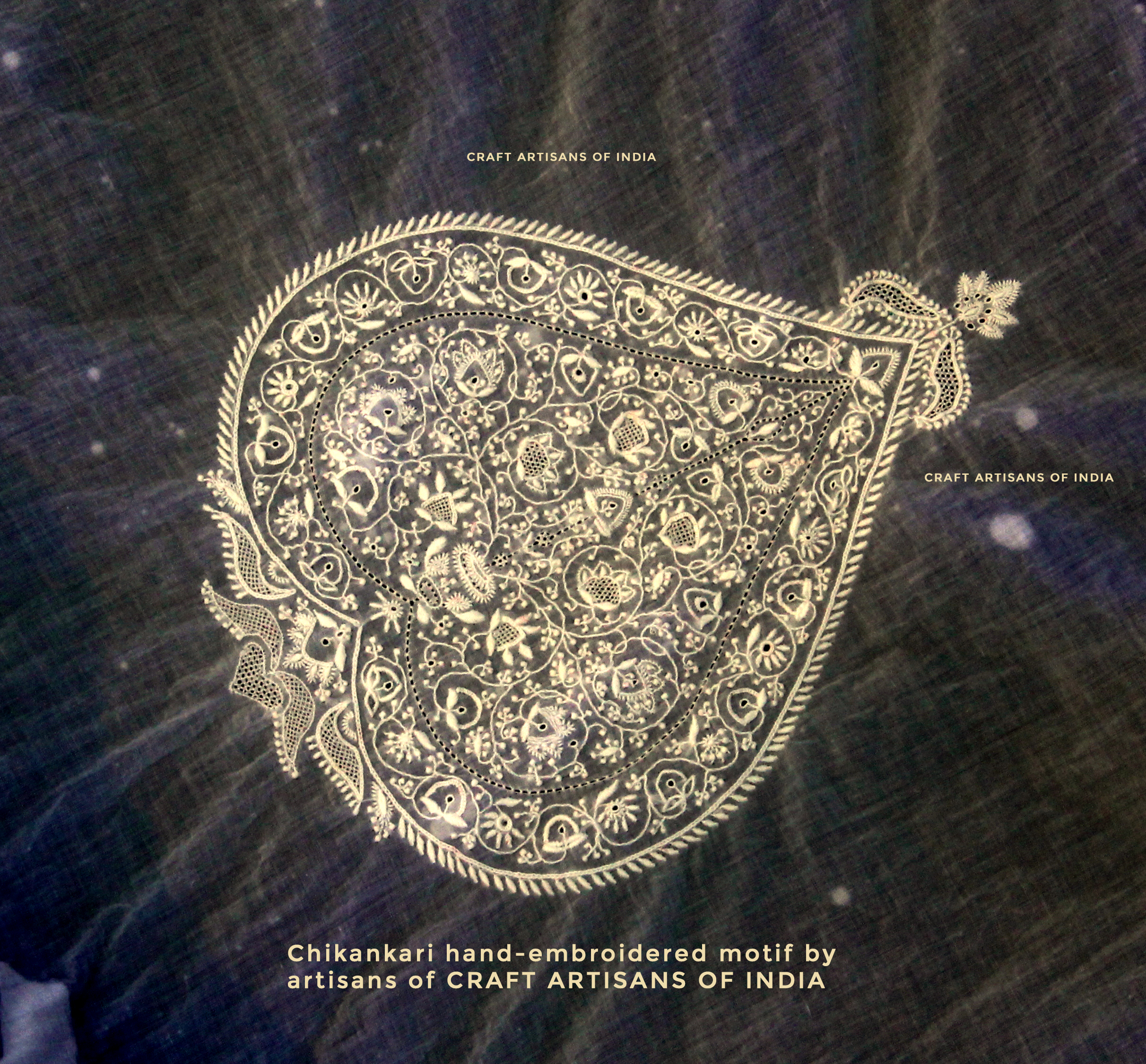
Traditional Chikankari hand-embroidery by Craft Artisans of India

Chikankari (Urdu: چِکن کاری, Hindi: चिकन की कढ़ाई, चिकनकारी) is a traditional embroidery style from Lucknow, India. Translated, the word means embroidery (using thread or wire), and it is one of Lucknow's best known textile decoration styles. The main market in Lucknow for Chikankari based products is Chowk. Production is mainly based in Lucknow and in the adjoining districts.

== Origin ==
There are references to embroidery similar to chikan work in India as early as 3rd century BC by Megasthenes, who mentioned use of flowered muslins by Indians, but these embroidered patterns lacked the characteristic features of chikan, such as colour, ornamentation, or any notable embellishment. According to Laila Tyabji, chikankari stems from the white-on-white embroidery of Shiraz came to India as part of a culture of Persian nobles at the Mughal court. There is also a tale that mentions how a traveler taught chikan to a peasant in return of water to drink. The most popular origin story credits Noor Jahan, Mughal empress and wife of Jahangir, for introducing chikankari to India.

Chikan began as a type of white-on-white (or whitework) embroidery.

== Technique ==
The technique of chikan embroidery is known as chikankari (चिकनकारी چکن کاری). Chikankari is a delicate and artfully done hand embroidery on a variety of textile fabrics like cotton, chanderi, muslin, georgette, viscose, silk, organza, net, etc. White thread is embroidered on cool, pastel shades of light muslin and cotton garments. Nowadays chikan embroidery is also done with colored and silk threads in colors to meet the fashion trends and keep chikankari up-to-date. Lucknow is the heart of the chikankari industry today and the variety is known as Lucknawi chikan.

Chikan work in recent times has adopted additional embellishments like Mukaish, Kamdani, Badla, sequin, bead, and mirror work, which gives it a rich look. Chikan embroidery is mostly done on fabrics like cotton, semi-Georgette, pure Georgette, crepe, chiffon, silk, and any other fabric which is light and which highlights the embroidery. The fabric cannot be too thick or hard, else the embroidery needle won't pierce it. Also, sheer fabric allows the part of the stitches on the reverse of the fabric to give a shadow effect, which is characteristic of the technique.

The piece begins with one or more pattern blocks that are used to block-print a pattern on the ground fabric. The embroiderer stitches the pattern, and the finished piece is carefully washed to remove all traces of the printed pattern. The process of chikankari includes the following steps:

- Design
- Engraving
- Block printing
- Embroidery
- Washing and finishing

=== Stitches ===
The patterns and effects created depend on the stitches and the thicknesses of the threads used. Some of the stitches include backstitch, chain stitch and hemstitch. The result is an open work pattern, jali (lace) or shadow-work. Often the embroiderer creates mesh-like sections by using a needle to separate threads in the ground fabric, and then working around the spaces. It consists of 32 stitches:

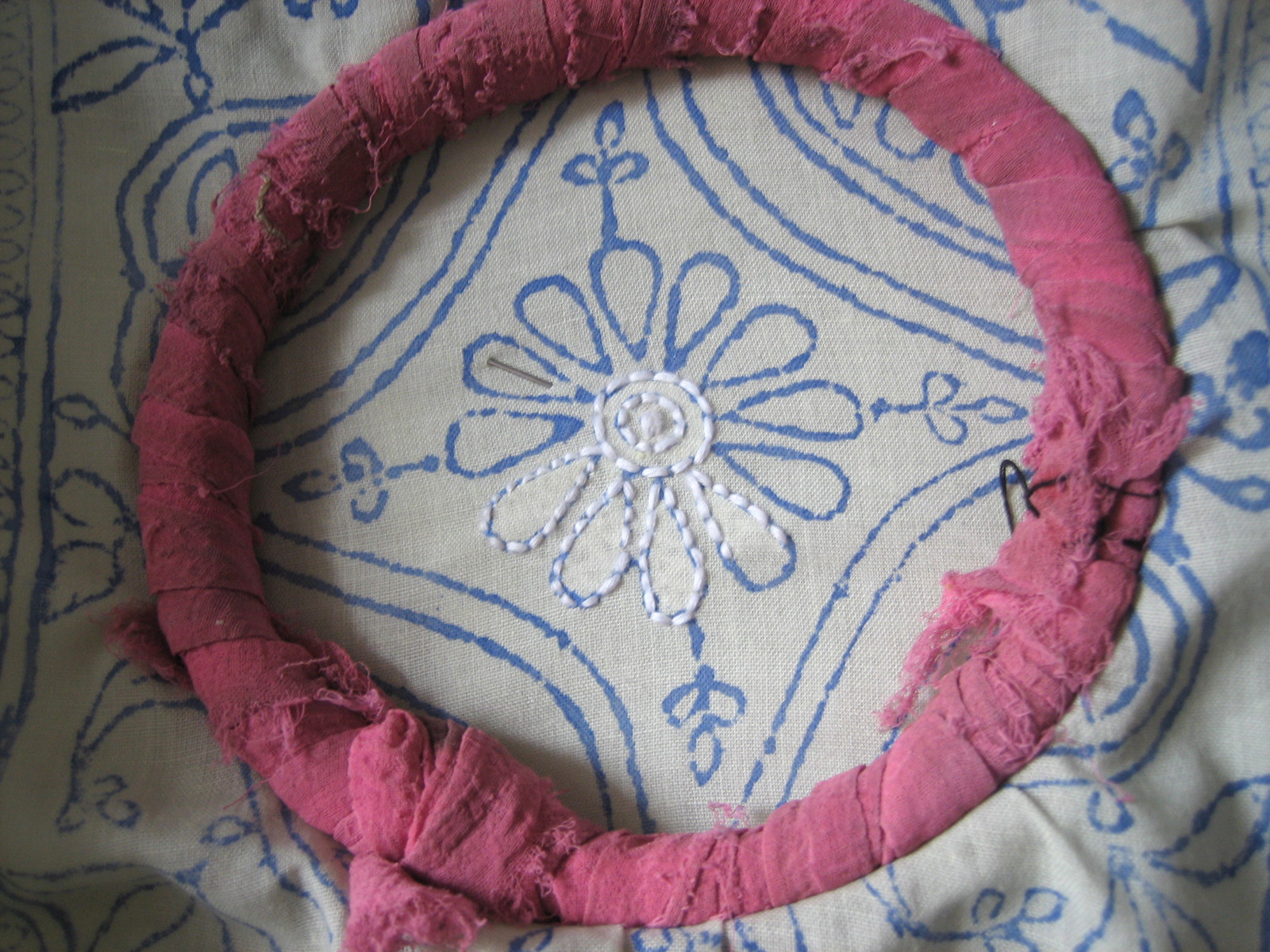
Front view of Bakhiya Chikan embroidery being done over temporary block printed pattern

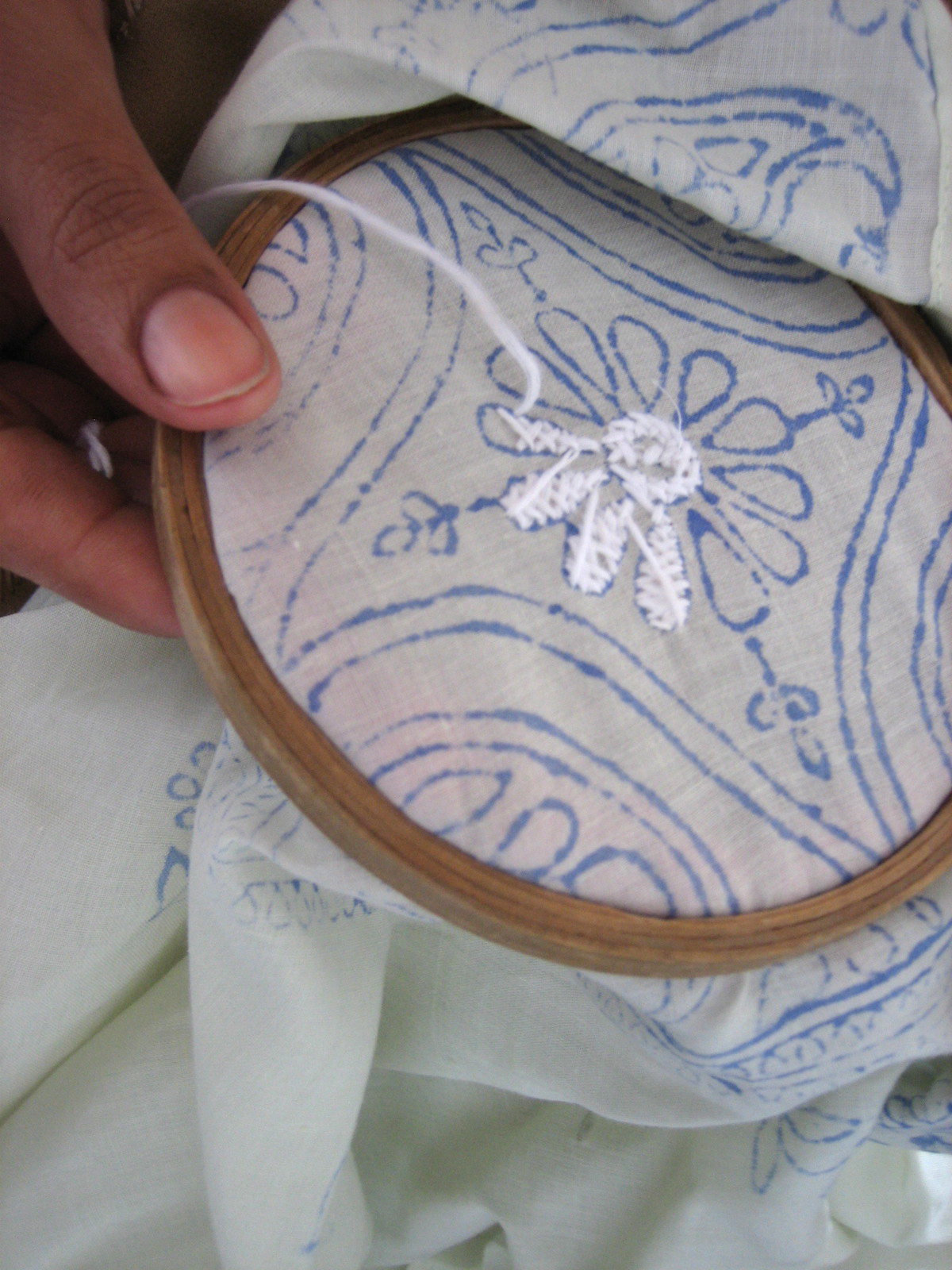
Bakhiya Chikan embroidery from the back

- Chikankari-Tepchi is a long-running or darning stitch worked with six strands on the right side of the fabric taken over four threads and picking up one. Thus, a line is formed. It is used principally as a basis for further stitchery and occasionally to form a simple shape.
- Bakhiya — 'Shadow work' or bhakia is one of the stitches of chikankari. The reason for the name shadow is that the embroidery is done on wrong side and we see its shadow on the right side.
- Hool is a fine detached eyelet stitch. A hole is punched in the fabric and the threads are teased apart. It is then held by small straight stitches all round and worked with one thread on the right side of the fabric. It can be worked with six threads and often forms the center of a flower.
- Zanzeera
- Rahet
- Banarsi
- Khatau
- Phanda
- Murri is the form of stitch used to embroider the centre of the flowers in chikan work motifs. They are typically French knots that are rice-shaped. Murri is the oldest and most sought-after form of chikankari. The use of this stitch is depleting due to a decrease in the artisans doing this embroidery.
- Jali stitch is one where the thread is never drawn through the fabric, ensuring that the back portion of the garment looks as impeccable as the front. The warp and weft threads are carefully drawn apart and minute buttonhole stitches are inserted into the cloth.
- Turpai
- Darzdari
- Pechani
- Bijli
- Ghaspatti
- Makra
- Kauri
- Hathkadi
- Banjkali
- Sazi
- Karan
- Kapkapi
- Madrazi
- Bulbul-chasm
- Taj Mahal
- Janjeera
- Kangan''
- Dhania-patti
- Rozan
- Meharki
- Chanapatti
- Baalda
- Jora
- Keel kangan
- Bulbul
- Sidhaul
- Ghas ki patti

== GI status ==
Geographical Indication Registry (GIR) accorded Geographical Indication (GI) status for chikankari in December 2008, which recognized Lucknow as an exclusive hub of chikankari.

== In popular culture ==
The 1986 Indian film Anjuman directed by Muzaffar Ali and starring Shabana Azmi and Farooque Shaikh is set in Lucknow and deals with issues of chikan workers. In fact, Farooque Shaikh was so charmed by this fabric and style that he wore chikan all his life and came to be identified as a brand ambassador of sorts of Lakhnavi chikankari.
