= Farooq Sheikh =

Indian actor (1948–2013)

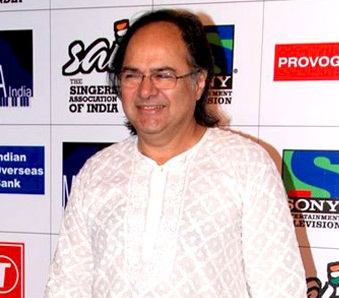
- Sheikh at Mirchi Music Awards in 2011
- Pronunciation: [fɑːɾuːq ʃɛːx]
- Born: 25 March 1948; Amroli, Baroda State, India
- Died: 28 December 2013 (aged 65); Dubai, United Arab Emirates
- Resting place: Muslim Qabristan, Four Bungalows, Andheri West, Mumbai, Maharashtra, India
- Education: St. Xavier's College, Mumbai; Siddharth College of Law, Mumbai
- Occupation: Actor
- Years active: 1973–2013
- Spouse: Rupa Sheikh
- Children: Two

Farooq Sheikh (Hindustani pronunciation: [fɑːɾuːq ʃɛːx]; 25 March 1948 − 28 December 2013), also spelled Farouque Shaikh, was an Indian actor, philanthropist and television presenter. He was best known for his work in Hindi films from 1973 to 1993 and for his work in television between 1988 and 2002. He returned to acting in films in 2008 and continued to do so until his death on 28 December 2013. His major contribution was in Parallel Cinema or the New Indian Cinema. He worked with directors like Satyajit Ray, Sai Paranjpye, Muzaffar Ali, Hrishikesh Mukherjee, Ayan Mukherjee and Ketan Mehta.

He acted in serials and shows on television and performed on stage in productions such as Tumhari Amrita (1992), alongside Shabana Azmi, directed by Feroz Abbas Khan, and presented the TV show, Jeena Isi Ka Naam Hai (Season 1). He won the 2010 National Film Award for Best Supporting Actor for Lahore.

== Personal life ==
Sheikh was born in 1948 at Amroli, 90 km off Vadodara in Naswadi district, Gujarat, India to Farida and Mustafa Sheikh. His father was a lawyer who worked in Bombay and whose family came from Hansot in the Bharuch district of Gujarat. Shaikh came from a Zamindar family, and he grew up in luxurious surroundings in his ancestral village, before moving to Nagpada, Bombay while still a child. He was the eldest of five children.

Shaikh attended St. Mary's School in Bombay and then graduated from St. Xavier's College in the city before studying law at Siddharth College of Law, following his father into the profession. He did not, however, undertake a legal career, instead choosing theatre, having acted in college.

At St Xavier's Shaikh met Roopa, his future wife. Both were active in theatre and were later married after nine years; the couple have two daughters Sanaa and Shaista. His time at St. Xavier's was important for both personal and professional reasons and he made many friends there, including Sunil Gavaskar, who was a contemporary. Actor Shabana Azmi, then known mainly as the daughter of noted poet Kaifi Azmi, was Roopa's classmate at St Xavier's.

== Career ==
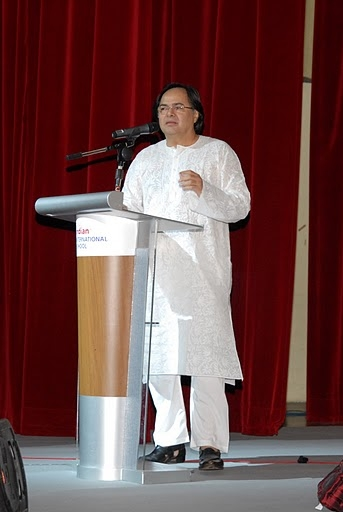
Farooque Shaikh

In his early days, he was active in theatre, doing plays with IPTA and with well-known directors like Sagar Sarhadi. In 1973, while Shaikh was in his final year of law school, MS Sathyu approached him for his directorial debut Garam Hawa. His first major film role was in the 1973 film Garam Hawa, where Farooque had a supporting role and the leading man was Balraj Sahni. The film is credited for being a pioneer of a new wave of Hindi Art cinema. His salary for his debut film was only Rs. 750. He first gained recognition as a quiz master on radio, but it was his participation as an anchor on Bombay Doordarshan shows such as Yuvadarshan and Young World that made him a household name. Shaikh in Gaman (1978) acted as the migrant Bombay taxi driver from Badaun in Uttar Pradesh hoping to return to meet his wife, but never saves up enough to return home. He went on to act in several notable films such as Satyajit Ray's Shatranj Ke Khiladi (Chess Players) (1977), Noorie (1979), Chashme Buddoor (1981), Umrao Jaan (1981), Bazaar (1982), Saath Saath (1982), Rang Birangi (1983), Kissi Se Na Kehna (1983), Ek Baar Chale Aao (1983), Katha (1983), Ab Ayega Mazaa (1984), Salma (1985), Faasle (1985), Peechha Karo (1986), Biwi Ho To Aisi (1988), and Maya Memsaab (1993). He formed a successful pair with Deepti Naval. He also did a slightly negative role in Katha.

He was paired opposite Shabana Azmi in Sagar Sarhadi's Lorie, Kalpana Lajmi's Ek Pal and Muzaffar Ali's Anjuman (1986) and then in the play Tumhari Amrita. His chemistry with Deepti Naval led to them being cast opposite each other in nine films, namely Chashme Buddoor, Katha, Saath Saath, Kissi Se Na Kehna, Rang Birangi, Ek Baar Chale Aao, Tell Me Oh Khuda, Faasle and Listen... Amaya. They also appeared as the lead pair in an episode on Hasrat Mohani in the TV serial Kahkashan.

In 2002, in an interview with The Times of India, Shaikh said, "I have never been commercially viable. People recognise me, smile and wave at me — but I have never received marriage proposals written in blood. In his heyday in 1970s and 1980s, when Rajesh Khanna drove down a street, the traffic stopped — I don't mind not receiving this kind of adulation. But I do miss not having been able to command the kind of work I wanted which Khanna could always do. I miss not being 100 per cent commercially viable like him."

In the 1990s, he acted in fewer films. But resurfaced in notable roles in the 2000s. He appeared in Saas Bahu Aur Sensex (2008) and Lahore (2009), for which he won the 2010 National Film Award for Best Supporting Actor. He appeared as Bunny (Ranbir Kapoor)'s father in Yeh Jawaani Hai Deewani (2013). His last film as the leading man was Club 60 (2013) which was also his last release before his death. Realbollywood.com said about his performance in the film: "As a grieving father who won't allow his loss to be forgotten, he hits all the right notes treading that thin line between melancholy and maudlin with majestic grace." He also appeared in Youngistaan and Children of War, both of which released in 2014, after his demise.

In the 80s-90s, Farooque Shaikh appeared in several television serials. He played the title role in an episode dedicated to the poet and freedom fighter Hasrat Mohani in the TV series Kahkashan (1988) with Deepti Naval playing his wife. He also worked in the famous TV serial Shrikant which aired on Doordarshan from 1987 to 1991. This show was an adaptation of Sarat Chandra Chattopadhyay's novel. This was followed by Aahaa on Zee. Chamatkar on Sony and Ji Mantriji (an adaptation of Yes Minister), on Star Plus were other notable successes. Shaikh also had a cameo in Life OK's Do Dil Ek Jaan, where he was seen as the leading lady's father in the initial episodes.

Earlier in the 70s he compered the Binny Double or Quits Quiz contest, which was telecast over Vividh Bharati. His career on stage that began as a student at St. Xavier's College in the late 1960s reached its peak in the famous play Tumhari Amrita. It was directed by Feroz Abbas Khan and also featured Shabana Azmi. A sequel to this play was staged in 2004 titled Aapki Soniya, with Farooque Shaikh and Sonali Bendre as the only performers. Tumhari Amrita completed its 20-year run on 27 February 2012. He directed Aazar Ka Khwab, an adaptation of Bernard Shaw's Pygmalion in 2004.

He hosted the TV show Jeena Issi Ka Naam Hai, in which he interviewed celebrities from the Hindi film world. His sense of humour and direct humble approach was the USP of the show.

Lesser known is his contribution to the UNICEF polio eradication programme. He made several extensive trips to two polio-endemic states, Bihar and Uttar Pradesh, and worked closely with its programme teams who were working with communities to get greater acceptance for the polio vaccine. He also kept on helping 26/11 affected families in Mumbai.

== Death ==
Farooque Shaikh died of a heart attack in the early hours of 28 December 2013 in Dubai, where he was on holiday with his family. His funeral prayers, held in Mumbai at Millat Nagar Andheri Mosque on 30 December 2013 in the evening, were attended by many personalities, including Javed Akhtar and Shabana Azmi. He was buried in Muslim Qabristan, Four Bungalows, Andheri West. His grave is near that of his mother Farida Shaikh.

== Filmography ==
=== Film ===
| Year | Title | Role | Notes |
|---|---|---|---|
| 1973 | Garam Hawa | Sikandar Mirza | Debut film role |
| 1974 | Mere Saath Chal | Amit | |
| 1977 | Gher Gher Matina Chula | Ajay | |
| 1977 | Shatranj Ke Khilari | Aqueel | |
| 1978 | Gaman | Ghulam Hussain | |
| 1979 | Noorie | Yusuf Fakir Mohammed | |
| 1980 | Main Aur Meri Tanhai | | |
| 1981 | Chashme Buddoor | Siddharth Parashar | |
| 1981 | Umrao Jaan | Nawab Sultan | |
| 1982 | Saath Saath | Avinash | |
| 1982 | Bazaar | Sarju | |
| 1982 | Apeksha | Rana | |
| 1983 | Rang Birangi | Prof. Jeet Saxena | |
| 1983 | Kissi Se Na Kehna | Ramesh | |
| 1983 | Katha | Bashudev | |
| 1983 | Ek Baar Chale Aao | Kamal D. Das | |
| 1984 | Lorie | Bhupinder Singh | |
| 1984 | Lakhon Ki Baat | Alok Prakash | |
| 1984 | Yahan Wahan | Rajesh Chopra | |
| 1984 | Ab Ayega Mazaa | Vijay | |
| 1985 | Zahr E Ishq | | |
| 1985 | Faasle | Sanjay | |
| 1985 | Salma | Iqbal | |
| 1986 | Raat Ke Baad | | |
| 1986 | Peechha Karo | Vijay | |
| 1986 | Khel Mohabbat Ka | Amit Verma | |
| 1986 | Uddhar | | |
| 1986 | Mere Saath Chal | Amit | |
| 1986 | Ek Pal | Jeet Barua | |
| 1986 | Anjuman | Sajid | |
| 1987 | Mahananda | Professor Babul | |
| 1987 | Rajlakshmi | Shrikant | |
| 1988 | Gharwali Baharwali | Sunil Khanna | |
| 1988 | Soorma Bhopali | | |
| 1988 | Biwi Ho To Aisi | Suraj Bhandari | |
| 1989 | Toofan | Gopal Sharma | |
| 1989 | Doosra Kanoon | Diwan Sardarilal | TV movie |
| 1990 | Wafaa | Shekhar | |
| 1990 | Agni Kanya | | |
| 1990 | Jaan-E-Wafa | | |
| 1992 | Gunjan | | |
| 1992 | Binani | | |
| 1993 | Maya Memsaab | Dr. Charu Das | |
| 1995 | Sukher Asha | | |
| 1995 | Mohini | | |
| 1995 | Mera Damad | Jai Khanna | |
| 1995 | Ab Insaf Hoga | Ramcharan | |
| 1997 | Mohabbat | Shekhar Sharma | |
| 1998 | Le Lépidoptère | Le collègue du jongleur | Short |
| 2008 | Saas Bahu Aur Sensex | Firoze Sethna | |
| 2009 | Lahore | S K Rao | |
| 2009 | Accident on Hill Road | Prakash Shrivastava | |
| 2011 | Tell Me O Khuda | Ravi Kapoor | |
| 2012 | Shanghai | Kaul | |
| 2013 | Listen... Amaya | Jayant | |
| 2013 | Yeh Jawaani Hai Deewani | Sanjay Thapar | |
| 2013 | Club 60 | Dr. Tarique | Final film role |
| 2014 | Youngistaan | Akbar Patel / Akbar Uncle | Posthumous release |
| 2014 | Children of War | Museed | Posthumous release |
| | Sangini | | (unreleased) |

=== Television ===
| Year | Title | Role | Channel | Notes |
|---|---|---|---|---|
| 1987 | Shrikant | Shrikant | DD National | |
| 1988 | Param Vir Chakra | Major Somnath Sharma | DD National | |
| 1995 | Chamatkar | Prem | Sony TV | |
| 1998 | Khiladi | Veer Singh | DD National | |
| 2001 | Ji Mantriji | Surya Prakash Singh | Star Plus | |
| 2002 | Jeena Isi Ka Naam Hai | Himself | Zee TV | |

== Awards and recognition ==
| Year | Nominee / work | Award | Result |
|---|---|---|---|
| 2010 | Lahore | National Film Award for Best Supporting Actor | Won |
| 2019 | | Bimal Roy Lifetime Achievement Award {First time presented to an artist posthumously} | |

- On 25 March 2018, search engine Google commemorated Farooq Sheikh with a Doodle on his 70th birth anniversary. Google commented: "Farouque Shaikh essayed agonizing heartbreak and light-hearted comedy with equal ease. Beyond the silver screen, Shaikh was integral to Indian theater, and his epistolary play, 'Tumhari Amrita' with Shabana Azmi delighted audiences for over two decades."
