= Kokilaben Dhirubhai Ambani Hospital =

Geography
- Location: Four Bungalows, Mumbai, India
- Coordinates: 19°7′51.78″N 72°49′30.19″E

Organisation
- Patron: Tina Ambani (Chairperson)

Services
- Beds: 750

History
- Opened: 2009; 17 years ago

Links
- Website: www.kokilabenhospital.com
- Lists: Hospitals in India

Kokilaben Dhirubhai Ambani Hospital is a tertiary-care hospital in Four Bungalows, Mumbai, India. The hospital is named after Kokilaben Ambani, wife of industrialist Dhirubhai Ambani, who was the founder of Reliance Industries.

== History ==
The 750 bed multi-speciality hospital became operational in the first week of 2009. The project was initiated in 1999 by Nitu Mandke as a large-scale heart hospital, but ran into troubles after his death in 2003. Subsequently, it was completed by the Anil Ambani-led Reliance ADA group. The hospital has boasted of many firsts not only in India but also in Asia. Kokilaben Dhirubhai Ambani Hospital has the first 3-room intra-operative MRI suite (IMRIS) in Asia, Asia's first EDGE Radiosurgery system from Varian Medical Systems, India's 1st Spine Surgery Suite featuring the O-arm and many more.

The hospital courted controversy in 2014 when it offered incentives to doctors for referring patients. It later apologised to the Maharashtra Medical Council.

In 2016, the hospital announced that it would be setting up 18 cancer-care centres in rural Maharashtra, under the name Reliance Cancer Centre's that will be operated and managed by Kokilaben Dhirubhai Ambani Hospital.

== Departments ==
- Bariatric Surgery
- Vascular Surgery
- Clinical Haemotology
- Hepato Pancreato Biliary
- Cosmetology
- Ophthalmology
- Dermatology
- Hepatology
- Genetics & Molecular Medicine
- Infectious Diseases
- Minimal Access Surgery
- Nuclear Medicine
- Regenerative Medicine
- Transfusion Medicine
- General Medicine
- Pain Management & Palliative Care
- Plastic & Reconstructive Surgery
- Psychiatry
- Pulmonary Medicine
- Pulmonology
- Cardiology (non-interventional)
- Gastroenterology
- Endocrinology
- Gynaecology & Obstetrics
- Radiology
- Pathology
- General surgery
- Internal medicine
- Orthopedic surgery Orthopaedic and fracture treatment
- Otolaryngology E.N.T (Ear, Nose, Throat)
- Nephrology
- Urology
