= Hamara Ghar (1964 film) =

1964 film by Khwaja Ahmad Abbas

- Directed by: K. A. Abbas
- Written by: K. A. Abbas
- Produced by: K. A. Abbas
- Starring: Dilip Raj; Surekha; Nana Palsikar
- Cinematography: Ramchandra
- Music by: J. P. Kaushik
- Production company: Naya Sansar
- Release date: 1964
- Running time: 152 minutes
- Country: India
- Language: Hindi

Hamara Ghar (Our House) is a 1964 Hindi social drama film directed by K. A. Abbas for his "Naya Sansar" banner. The cinematographer was Ramchandra, and the story was written by K. A. Abbas. The music director was J. P. Kaushik with lyrics written by Ali Sardar Jafri and Iqbal. The cast included Surekha, Dilip Raj, Yasmin Khan, Rekha Rao, Sonal Mehta, Nana Palsikar

The film focused on national integration by showcasing a group of children from different backgrounds, marooned on a deserted island. The film won awards at the various film festivals in US, Spain and Czechoslovakia.

== Plot ==
Children from different social backgrounds and ethnicity are travelling on a steamer bound for Goa. When they are marooned on a deserted island, they get together and build a shelter called Hamara Ghar (Our House). Several incidents take place like a near-drowning, discovery of hidden treasure, different factions in the group, which are all dealt with in a spirit of togetherness. However, despondency soon settles in, and they wait to be rescued. Finally a search helicopter finds them and they leave the island, with their shelter, Hamar Ghar, still standing.

== Cast ==
- Surekha
- Dileep Raj son P. Jairaj
- Sunil Kaushik son of the music director J.P. Kaushik
- Yasmin Khan
- Rekha Rao
- Sonal Mehta
- Nana Palsikar
- Lalita

== Awards ==
The film won three awards at International Film Festivals, which included Santa Barbara (US), Gijon (Spain), as well as the Jury's Special Prize at the Festival of Children's Films at Gottwaldov, Czechoslovakia.

== Soundtrack ==
With the exception of "Saare Jahan Se Achha Hindustan Hamara", which was written by Iqbal, the lyricist was Ali Sardar Jafri for the rest of the songs. The music was composed by J.P. Kaushik with the playback singing given by Mahendra Kapoor and Vijaya Majumdar.

=== Songs ===
#	Title	Singer
1	"Usha Jagamag Jagmag"	Mahendra Kapoor
2	"Yeh Kaahe Ki Soch Hai Tujhko"	Mahendra Kapoor
3	"Saare Jahan Se Achha Hindostaan Hamara"	Vijaya Majumdar
4	"Aao Babu Dhotiwalo"	Vijaya Majumdar
5	"Raja Ji Pachhatayenge Royenge Aur Gayenge"	Vijaya Majumdar
6	"Chale Hawa Purwai Usha Jagmag Jagmag Aai"	Vijaya Majumdar
