= Valia College =

- D.N. Nagar; Andheri (W); Mumbai-400053. Maharashtra; India

Information
- Type: Junior and Degree College
- Established: 1961
- Principal: Mrs.Shobha Menon
- Campus: Urban
- Affiliations: University of Mumbai
- Website: valiacollege.in

Valia College is an education institute, established in 1961, run by Cosmopolitan Education Society located at D.N. Nagar, in Andheri West, Mumbai. The college is affiliated with University of Mumbai and accredited by NAAC. In 1961, it was the spirit of idealism that inspired a group of like minded residents of D. N. Nagar, Andheri (W) to establish a quality educational institution. Thus, was the Cosmopolitan Education Society was born. Under its Aegis, the society runs the Valia College of Commerce and Arts which offers various programmes at undergraduate and post-graduate levels.

== See also ==
- List of colleges in Mumbai
