= Saat Hindustani =

1969 film by Khwaja Ahmad Abbas

- Theatrical release poster
- Directed by: Khwaja Ahmad Abbas
- Written by: Khwaja Ahmad Abbas
- Produced by: Khwaja Ahmad Abbas
- Starring: Madhu; Utpal Dutt; Jalal Agha; Anwar Ali; Madhukar; Amitabh Bachchan; Shehnaz
- Cinematography: S. Ramachandra
- Edited by: Mohan Rathod
- Music by: J. P. Kaushik
- Release date: 7 November 1969
- Running time: 144 minutes
- Country: India
- Languages: Hindi; Urdu
- Box office: ₹810,000 (net)

Saat Hindustani (transl. Seven Indians) is a 1969 Indian Hindi-language action film written, directed, and produced by Khwaja Ahmad Abbas. The film portrays the heroic story of seven Indians who attempt to liberate Goa from the Portuguese colonial rule. The film stars an ensemble cast led by Madhu, Utpal Dutt, Jalal Agha, Anwar Ali, Madhukar, Amitabh Bachchan (in his film debut), and Shehnaaz.

== Plot ==
A Muslim poet, Anwar Ali, from Bihar and five other men, all belonging to different religions and parts of India, join their seventh comrade Maria, a native of the Portuguese-occupied Goa, to raise nationalist sentiments in the state by hoisting Indian flags on Portuguese forts and buildings.

== Cast ==
- Madhu as Subodh Sanyal
- Utpal Dutt as Jogender Nath
- Jalal Agha as Sakharam Shinde
- Anwar Ali as Ram Bhagat Sharma
- Madhukar as Mahadevan
- Amitabh Bachchan as Anwar Ali
- Shehnaaz as Maria (as Shahnaz)
- A. K. Hangal as Doctor
- Dina Pathak as Mrs. J. Nath
- Prakash Thapa as Tax Inspector
- Kanu Sarswat

== Production ==
Saat Hindustani was directed and produced by Khwaja Ahmed Abbas. He also wrote the film's dialogue. Cinematography was done by Mohan Rathod.

Shooting primarily took place in Goa.

== Soundtrack ==
The film's music was composed by J. P. Kaushik and Kaifi Azmi was the lyricist. Songs were sung by Mahendra Kapoor.

== Awards ==
National Film Awards

- Nargis Dutt Award for Best Feature Film on National Integration
- National Film Award for Best Lyrics - Kaifi Azmi
