= Nitu Mandke =

Indian Cardiac surgeon

Dr. Nityanand Mandke
- Born: 31 January 1948; Pune, Bombay State, India
- Died: 22 May 2003 (aged 55); Mumbai, Maharashtra, India
- Years active: 1970–2003 (33 years)
- Known for: Heart and heart-lung transplants

Nityanand Mandke was an Indian cardiac surgeon from Mumbai. He had carried out over 10,000 cardiac surgeries which is one of the records. A book named Hridayasth has been published. The book is based on Nityanand's career and it is high sold in Marathi and English.

== Early life ==
Mandke was born on 31 January 1948. After graduating from B.J. Medical College, Pune, he came to Mumbai for his post graduation in General Surgery and Cardio-thoracic surgery, which he did from KEM Hospital, Mumbai under Dr. P. K. Sen. After a short stint at the LTMC Hospital, Sion, Mumbai as an assistant professor. Mandke was boxing champion, captain of soccer team and a record holding distance runner, during his college days. He was adjudged the best all round student of Pune University during the year 1970.

== Career ==
Mandke went to the United Kingdom and later to the United States and worked with Magdi Yacoub, Dr. Kirklin and Dr. Pacifico. Between 1979 and 1984, he worked at the University of Alabama and thereafter in Germany for some time. In 1985, he decided to come back to India and set up his own hospital that would specialise in treatment of cardiac illnesses. He was consultant cardio-thoracic surgeon in Mumbai. He had treated several VIP patients, including Shiv Sena chief Bal Thackeray Mandke was a dexterous surgeon. He was equally at ease while operating upon a 6 month old blue baby as well as a 60-year-old man for coronary artery disease. He taught the finer technicalities of off-pump surgery to many students.

Mandke had established his dream hospital project in Andheri, Mumbai, It is now renamed the Kokilaben Dhirubhai Ambani Hospital.

== Death ==
Mandke was admitted to the Hinduja Hospital after a mild attack. He died at the same Hospital at 2.30 pm on Thursday 22 May 2003 following a severe heart attack.
