= Four Bungalows =

- Neighbourhood
- Location within Mumbai
- Coordinates: 19.124714°N 72.82721°E
- Country: India
- State: Maharashtra
- District: Mumbai Suburban
- City: Mumbai

Government
  - Type: Municipal Corporation
  - Body: Brihanmumbai Municipal Corporation (MCGM)
- Time zone: UTC+5:30 (IST)
- Area code: 022
- Vehicle registration: MH-02

Four Bungalows is a neighbourhood in Mumbai, India. It is located about three kilometres from Andheri station and is in the vicinity of Lokhandwala Complex and Seven Bungalows and houses the legendary apartment Anita Apartments.

The five main landmarks are Kokilaben Dhirubhai Ambani Hospital, the Fish Market, Manish Market, the Good Shepherd Church and St. Louis Convent school, which is located within the second lane from the Four Bungalows signal/junction.

It has a very famous and old Dairy and Restaurant known as Sharma Fastfood and Restaurant. It was established in around 1980. Another major chain is the Jagdish General Store.

It consists one of the few HSBC branches in Mumbai.

Other places in the vicinity include Convent Avenue, Ratan Nagar society and Manish Nagar. It also has a Gurudwara (Sikh temple) on the main road. It is accessible through BEST bus routes 266, 249 and 251 from Andheri Station or a Metro from the Andheri Station.

Four Bungalows is named after the 'four bungalows' that once existed here during the British occupation. Two of them still exist today, one just opposite Good Shepherd Church. It is named Gulab Cottage. The other is in better condition and located in the lane just behind the Good Shepherd Church. This place also consists of a large number of residential buildings, built around 25 to 40 years past, that is the time when this place came under proper development. This place is easily accessible to Lokhandwala, Versova, Yari Road, Andheri Station and Juhu-Vile Parle.

The depot for the Versova-Andheri Ghatkopar line of the Mumbai Metro is located here.

== Good Shepherd Church ==
The Roman Catholic church dedicated to the Good Shepherd or Jesus Christ was built in the late 1980s. It stands between the market and two road-junction. The structure of the church can be described as a Zigami Chevron-shaped structure.

== St. Louis Lane ==
St. Louis lane is located at the second cross lane from Four Bungalows signal. It is a private lane, and is symbolized by the St. Louis Convent. There are five residential buildings in this lane which make a complex - Indra Sukh, Indra Darshan, Daswani, Popular and Blue Arch. The street here has undergone many changes and boasts of its cleanliness as compared to other lanes in Four Bungalows. The convent, which incorporates a girls' school, was built back in the 1970s. The convent itself has gone under many changes through the past few years. It is also called Convent Avenue Lane.

== The St. Louis school ==
The school is a high school up to the tenth grade. The school itself boasts of cent percent results almost every year. The school is a convent run by the nuns of the Carmelite order. the building is composed of a three-story structure which is L-shaped. In the 1970s, the school was just being built. At that time, the building consisted of only the ground floor. As funds floored in, the authorities managed to build it is into what it is today. It is a government funded school, and is host to voting during the time of elections.

== Kokilaben Dhirubhai Ambani Hospital & Medical Research Centre ==
The hospital is named after Kokilaben Ambani, wife of industrialist Dhirubhai Ambani, who was the founder of Reliance Industries. The Hospital is located at Four Bungalows signal next to Kamdhenu shopping mall.

== Ratan Nagar ==
Ratan Nagar is the first road heading westwards towards Seven bungalows and is the first road towards the Four Bungalows market, from the main signal. One of the most notable places in the area is a poultry butcher shop, Aziz Boiler.

A few condominium buildings include Ratan Kunj CHS, Sahayog, Golden Castle, Prema Sadan, Baba Sadan, Sai Sadan, Bhavishya Darshan and Vishwageet. An electric transformer is located at the entrance of the lane. Traffic is located only one way, the road leading to the main Four Bungalows market is blocked. Big vehicles, like trucks and cars are barred from entering this section of the road, while they are allowed to enter from the other side, which leads to Seven Bungalows.

- Seven Bungalows
- D.N. Nagar

The Dr. Kerkar General Hospital is the oldest hospital in the Four Bungalows area. There was not much locally when Dr. Kerkar General Hospital was built. Four Bungalows name came into existence because of the Four Bungalows originating during the British era.

== Jagdish Store ==
Jagdish store, The place where the commoners here go to purchase cigarettes and general items like beverages & milk. It closes at 11PM though.

== Manish Nagar ==
Manish Nagar and Ratan Nagar are divided by the vegetable market.

D N Nagar metro is at a walk-able distance from Manish nagar

Road Entrance from Manish Nagar to market is blocked for all vehicles except 2 wheeler and cycle.

Also at the entrance there is small Mumbai Police Beat Post.

Also there is a huge shopping market area known as Manish Shopping Centre

There are almost 50 buildings in Manish Nagar

It includes a huge playground along with a walking track connected to a temple

It has a children park with a tennis court for training

It has a community hall for functions
