= Garm Hava =

1973 Indian drama film

- Directed by: M. S. Sathyu
- Written by: Kaifi Azmi; Shama Zaidi
- Story by: Ismat Chughtai
- Produced by: Abu Siwani; Ishan Arya; M. S. Sathyu
- Starring: Balraj Sahni; Farooq Shaikh; Dinanath Zutshi; Badar Begum; Geeta Siddharth; Shaukat Kaifi; A. K. Hangal
- Cinematography: Ishan Arya
- Edited by: Sudhanshu Chakravarty
- Music by: Bahadur Khan
- Release date: 1973
- Running time: 146 minutes
- Country: India
- Languages: Hindi; Urdu

Garm Hava (translation: Hot Winds or Scorching Winds) is a 1973 Indian drama film directed by M. S. Sathyu, with Balraj Sahni as the lead actor.

It was written by Kaifi Azmi and Shama Zaidi, based on an unpublished short story by noted Urdu writer Ismat Chughtai. The film score was given by the classical musician Ustad Bahadur Khan, with lyrics by Kaifi Azmi. It also featured a qawwali composed and performed by Aziz Ahmed Khan Warsi and his Warsi Brothers troupe.

Set in Agra, Uttar Pradesh, the film deals with the plight of a North Indian Muslim businessman and his family, in the period after the 1947 Partition of India. Made with a shoestring budget, the entire film was shot on location in Agra. In the grim months after the assassination of Mahatma Gandhi in 1948, the film's protagonist and patriarch of the family, Salim Mirza, deals with the dilemma of whether to move to Pakistan, like many of his relatives, or stay back. The film details the slow disintegration of his family, and is one of the most poignant films made on India's partition. It remains one of the few serious films dealing with the post-Partition plight of Muslims in India.

It is often credited with pioneering a new wave of art cinema in Hindi films, along with Ankur (1973), a film from another debutant director, Shyam Benegal. Both are considered landmarks of Parallel Cinema in Hindi. Parallel cinema had already started flourishing in other parts of India, especially in Bengal (notably in the works of Satyajit Ray, Mrinal Sen and Ritwik Ghatak) and Kerala. The movie launched the career of actor Farooq Shaikh, and marked the end of Balraj Sahni's film career, who died before its release. It was India's official entry to the Academy Award's Best Foreign Film category, was nominated for the Palme d'Or at the Cannes Film Festival, won a National Film Award, and three Filmfare Awards. In 2005, Indiatimes Movies ranked the movie amongst the Top 25 Must See Bollywood Films.

== Plot ==
The Mirzas are a Muslim family living in a large ancestral house and running a shoe manufacturing business in the city of Agra in the United Provinces of northern India (now the state of Uttar Pradesh). The story begins in the immediate aftermath of India's independence and the partition of India in 1947. The family is headed by two brothers; Salim (Balraj Sahni), who heads the family business, and his elder brother Halim, who is mainly engaged in politics and is a major leader in the provincial branch of the All India Muslim League, which led the demand for the creation of a separate Muslim state of Pakistan. Salim has two sons, the elder Baqar, who helps him in the business, and Sikander (Farooq Shaikh), who is a young student. Halim's son Kazim is engaged to Salim's daughter, Amina. Although he had publicly promised to stay in India for the sake of its Muslims, Halim later decides to quietly emigrate to Pakistan with his wife and son, believing that there was no future for Muslims in India. Salim resists the notion of moving, believing that peace and harmony would return soon, besides which, he has to care for their ageing mother, who refuses to leave the house of her forefathers. This puts Kazim and Amina's marriage plans on hold, although Kazim promises to return soon to marry her. Halim's stealthy migration affects Salim's standing in the community. In the aftermath of partition, the sudden migration of many Muslims from Agra left banks and other lenders deeply reluctant to lend money to Muslim businessmen like Salim Mirza, who had previously been held in high esteem, over fears that they would leave the country without repaying the loan. Unable to raise capital to finance production, Salim Mirza's business suffers. Salim Mirza's brother-in-law, formerly a League supporter, now joins the ruling Indian National Congress in an attempt to get ahead in independent India, while his son Shamshad unsuccessfully woos Amina, who is still devoted to Kazim and hopeful of his return.

Halim's migration to Pakistan makes the family home an "evacuee property" as the house is in Halim's name and Halim did not transfer it to Salim Mirza. The Indian government mandates the take over of the house, forcing Salim Mirza's family to move out of their ancestral home, which is very hard on Mirza's aged mother. Salim's wife blames him for not raising this issue with his brother Halim before he left for Pakistan. Mirza resists his wife's hints that they also move to Pakistan and his elder son's calls for modernizing the family business. Mirza finds it difficult to rent a house, facing discrimination owing to his religion and fears that a Muslim family would skip out on rent if they decided to leave for Pakistan. He finally succeeds in finding a smaller house to rent, but his business is failing and despite his son's exhorting, refuses to change with the times, believing that Allah would protect them. Salim Mirza's passiveness and disconnection from the outside world leaves his wife and son frustrated. The Mirza family house is bought by a close business associate, Ajmani, (A.K. Hangal) who respects Mirza and tries to help him. Despite growing troubles, the family is briefly buoyed by Sikander's graduation from college.

Amina and her family have almost given up on her marrying Kazim after Halim breaks his promise to return soon from Pakistan. Kazim sneaks across the border and returns on his own, and reveals that his father had become opposed to his marrying Amina, preferring that he marry the daughter of a Pakistani politician. Having received a scholarship from the Government of Pakistan to study in Canada, Kazim desires to marry Amina before he leaves, but before the marriage can take place, he is arrested by police and repatriated to Pakistan for travelling without a passport and not registering at the police station, as is required of all citizens of Pakistan. Amina is heart-broken, and finally accepts Shamshad's courtship. Sikander undergoes a long string of unsuccessful job interviews, where the interviewers repeatedly suggest that he would have better luck in Pakistan. Sikander and his group of friends become disillusioned and start an agitation against unemployment and discrimination, but Salim prohibits Sikander from taking part. Despite his political connections, Salim Mirza's brother-in-law ends up in debt over shady business practices and decides to flee to Pakistan. Amina again faces the prospect of losing her lover, but Shamshad promises to return and not leave her like Kazim. Salim Mirza's reluctance to modernise and cultivate ties with the newly formed shoemakers union results in his business not receiving patronage and consequently failing. Disillusioned, his son Baqar decides to migrate to Pakistan with his son and wife. Salim's aged mother suffers a stroke, and through his friend, Salim is able to bring his mother to her beloved house for a final visit, where she dies. While Salim is travelling in a horse-drawn carriage, the carriage driver, a Muslim, gets into an accident and a squabble with other locals. The situation deteriorates into a riot, and Salim is hit by a stone and suffers injuries. With his business and elder son gone, Salim begins to work as a humble shoemaker to make a living. Shamshad's mother returns from Pakistan for a visit, leading Amina and her mother to think that Shamshad would also come soon and their marriage would take place. However, Shamshad's mother merely takes advantage of Salim Mirza's connections to release some of her husband's money, and reveals that Shamshad's marriage has been arranged with the daughter of a well-connected Pakistani family. Shattered with this second betrayal, Amina commits suicide, which devastates the whole family.

Amidst these problems, Salim Mirza is investigated by the police on charges of espionage over his sending of plans of their former property to his brother in Karachi, Pakistan. Although acquitted by the court, Mirza is shunned in public and faces a humiliating whisper campaign. Mirza's long aversion to leaving India finally breaks down and he decides in anger to leave for Pakistan. Sikander opposes the idea, arguing that they should not run away from India, but fight against the odds for the betterment of the whole nation, but Salim is called a spy for Pakistan and decides to leave anyway. However, as the family is travelling towards the railway station, they encounter a large crowd of protesters marching against unemployment and discrimination, which Sikander had planned to join. Sikander's friends call out to him, and Salim encourages him to join the protesters. He instructs the carriage driver to take his wife back to their house, and the film ends as Salim Mirza himself joins the protest, ending his isolation from the new reality.

== Adaptation ==
The film was an adaptation of Ismat Chughtai's story by noted Urdu poet and lyricist, Kaifi Azmi. While the original story centred on a station master, stuck in the throes of Partition, Kaifi Azmi brought in his own experiences as a union leader for the workers of a shoe manufacturing factory to the film. He not only changed the profession of the film's protagonist, but also placed him right in the middle of film's emotional cauldron, as he watches his livelihood (shoe manufacturing) and family disintegrating rapidly, immediately making the trauma of the Partition personal, compared to the original story, where the protagonist is a mere observer, watching his friends and family migrate. This fulfilled the main object of the film, which was to show the human consequences of a large political decision, which none of the people were party to. In the words of film director, M.S. Sathyu, "What I really wanted to expose in Garm Hava was the games these politicians play...How many of us in India really wanted the partition. Look at the suffering it caused."

The screenplay was written jointly by Kaifi Azmi, and Sathyu's wife, Shama Zaidi, with Kaifi Azmi adding dialogue to the film.

The movie ends with a poem/shairi by Kaifi Azmi:

"Jo door se toofan ka kartein hai nazara, unke liye toofan vahan bhi hai yahan bhi...
Daaere me jo mil jaoge ban jaoge daaera, yeh waqt ka ailaan vahan bhi hai yahan bhi"

== Cast ==
- Badar Begum as Mother of Salim Mirza, Halim Mirza and Akhtar Begum.
- Balraj Sahni as Salim Mirza (Balraj Sahni died before this film's release).
- Shaukat Azmi as Jamila, Salim's wife.
- Gita Siddharth as Amina, Salim's daughter.
- Abu Siwani as Baqar Mirza, Salim's elder son.
- Farooq Shaikh as Sikander Mirza, Salim's younger son.
- Dinanath Zutshi as Halim Mirza, brother of Salim Mirza. He is a Muslim politician.
- Jamal Hashmi as Kazim Mirza, son of Halim Mirza and thus Amina's first cousin. He is her first love interest.
- Ramma Bains as Akhtar Begum, sister of Salim Mirza, wife of Fakruddin, mother of Baqar's wife and of Shamshad Mian.
- Yunus Parvez as Fakruddin, husband of Akhtar Begum, father of Baqar's wife and of Shamshad Mian.
- Jalal Agha as Shamshad Mian, son of Akhtar Begum and thus Amina's first cousin. He is her second love interest.
- A. K. Hangal as Ajmani Sahib, a Hindu refugee from Pakistan. He is a broad-minded man, Salim's business associate and friend.
- Rajendra Raghuvanshi as Salim Mirza's tonga driver
- Gulshan Verma as Gulshan Verma
- Vikas Anand

== Production ==
The film was based on an unpublished short story by writer-screenwriter Ismat Chughtai and later adapted by Kaifi Azmi and Shama Zaidi. Chughtai narrated to them the story, which derived from the struggles of her own relatives during the Partition before some of them migrated to Pakistan. While developing the screenplay, poet-lyricist Azmi added his own experiences of Agra and the local leather industry. Later, he also wrote in the dialogues.

The film was shot on location in the city of Agra, with scenes of Fatehpur Sikri as well. Due to repeated local protests owing to its controversial theme, a fake second unit with unloaded cameras were sent to various locations to divert attention from the film's actual locations. As the film's commercial producers had early on backed out fearing public and governmental backlash, and the "Film Finance Corporation" (FFC), now National Film Development Corporation (NFDC), stepped in later with a funding of ₹ 250,000. Sathyu borrowed the remaining ₹ 750,000 of the budget from friends. The film was co-produced and shot by Ishan Arya, who after making ad films made his feature film debut, using a second-hand Arriflex camera, lent by Homi Sethna, Sathyu's friend. As Sathyu couldn't afford recording equipment, the film was shot silent, and the location sounds and voices were dubbed in post-production. Shama Zaidi also doubled up as the costume and production designer.

Sathyu had long been associated with the leftist Indian People's Theatre Association (IPTA), thus most roles in the film were played by stage actors from IPTA troupes in Delhi, Mumbai and Agra. The role of family patriarch, Salim Mirza was played by Balraj Sahni, also known to Sathyu through IPTA, and for whom this was to be his last important film role, and according to many his finest performance. The role of his wife was played by Shaukat Azmi, wife of film's writer Kaifi Azmi, and also associated with IPTA. Farooq Shaikh, a law student in Mumbai, till then had done small roles in IPTA plays, made his film debut with the role of Sikandar. The role of Balraj Sahni's mother was first offered to noted singer Begum Akhtar, which she refused, later Badar Begum played the role. The locale of the Mirza mansion was an old haveli of R. S. Lal Mathur in Peepal Mandi, who helped the whole unit throughout the shooting. Mathur helped Sathyu find Badar Begum in a city brothel. Badar Begum was then in her 70s and almost blind due to cataracts. However, when she was sixteen years old, she ran away to Bombay to work in Hindi films, but soon ran out of money and only managed to get work as an extra in a Wadia Movietone film. She used the money to return to Agra, and eventually ended up in the red-light area of the city and ran a brothel in the area. Her voice was later dubbed in by actress Dina Pathak. The film's lead, Balraj Sahni however, died the day after he finished dubbing for the film. The soundtrack included a qawwali "Maula Salim Chishti", by Aziz Ahmed Khan Warsi, of Warsi Brothers.

== Themes and allusions ==
The title alludes to the scorching winds of communalism, political bigotry and intolerance, that blew away humanity and conscience from across North-India in the years after the partition of India in 1947, and especially after the assassination of Mahatma Gandhi, to the which the film opens. In its prologue, poet Kaifi Azmi narrates a couplet summing up the theme, "Geeta ki koi sunta na Koran ki sunta, hairan sa eemaan vahan bhi tha yahan bhi" (Nobody listens to Gita or Quran, shocked conscience was here as well as there.) Just like his ageing mother is reluctant to leave the ancestral haveli where she came as a young bride, her son Salim Mirza, the protagonist, is also holding on to his faith in new India. With his shoe manufacturing business is suffering in the new communally charged environment, and having to sell off their haveli and move into a rented house, he struggles to keep his faith in secularism and idealism alive.

== Release and reception ==
Prior to its release, the film was held by the Central Board of India, for eight months, fearing communal unrest, but the film's director persisted and he showed it to government officials, leaders and journalists. Finally, the film was released to both critical and commercial success.

The film first opened at two theatres; Sagar and Sangeeth in Bangalore. Positive response at these theatres paved way for a subsequent nationwide release. The Indian premiere was held at Regal Cinema in Colaba, Mumbai in April 1974. However, Bal Thackeray, head of Shiv Sena, had threatened to burn down the cinema if the premiere was allowed, calling the film 'pro-Muslim' and 'anti-India'. On the day of the premiere, Thackeray was persuaded to attend a special screening of the film in the afternoon, and he then allowed the film to be screened. Subsequently, the film had a limited pan-India release. Ironically, in the 1974 National Film Awards, it was awarded the Nargis Dutt Award for Best Feature Film on National Integration.

Today it is noted for its sensitive handling of the controversial issue, dealt with in only a few Indian films. Notable other films include Kartar Singh (a 1959 Pakistani film), Manmohan Desai's Chhalia (1960), Yash Chopra's Dharmputra (1961), Govind Nihalani's Tamas (1986), Pamela Rooks' Train to Pakistan (1998), Manoj Punj's Shaheed-e-Mohabbat Boota Singh (1999) and Chandra Prakash Dwivedi's Pinjar (2003).

== Restoration and re-release ==
In 2009, privately-funded restoration work on the film started at Cameo Studios in Pune. Subsequently, the restoration budget climbed to over ₹ 10 million. Restoration work was done by Filmlab, Mumbai (Mr. Ujwal Nirgudkar), and the sound quality enhancement was by Deluxe Laboratories in Los Angeles, US. The process included restoration of the original soundtrack and took over three years to complete. The print was re-released on 14 November 2014 across 70 screens in eight metro cities in India.

== Awards ==
=== Academy Awards ===
- 1974: Indian submission for the Academy Award for Best Foreign Language Film

=== Cannes Film Festival ===
- 1974: Cannes Film Festival: Golden Palm – Nominated for "In Competition" section

=== National Film Awards ===
- 1974: Nargis Dutt Award for Best Feature Film on National Integration
- 1974: National Film Award for Best Story

=== Filmfare Awards ===
- 1975: Filmfare Best Dialogue Award- Kaifi Azmi - Won
- 1975: Filmfare Best Screenplay Award- Shama Zaidi, Kaifi Azmi - Won
- 1975: Filmfare Best Story Award- Ismat Chughtai, Kaifi Azmi - Won

== Bibliography ==
- Three Hindi Film Scripts, by Kafi Azmi and Shama Zaidi, 1974.
- Four and a Quarter Our Films, Their Films, by Satyajit Ray, Orient Longman, 2005. ISBN 81-250-1565-5.Page 100-102.
- Garm Hava (Hot Winds) 1973 Limiting Secularism: The Ethics of Coexistence in Indian Literature and Film, by Priya Kumar, University of Minnesota Press, 2008. ISBN 0-8166-5072-1. Page 186-187.

== See also ==
- List of submissions to the 47th Academy Awards for Best Foreign Language Film
- List of Indian submissions for the Academy Award for Best Foreign Language Film
