= Sebastian D'Souza =

Indian music arranger (1906–1998)

- Born: 29 January 1906; Reis Magos, Portuguese India, Portuguese Empire (now in India)
- Died: 9 March 1998 (aged 92)
- Genres: Film score, Jazz
- Occupations: Violinist, Music arranger, Orchestra conductor
- Instruments: Violin, Piano

Sebastian D'Souza (29 January 1906 – 9 March 1998) was an Indian music arranger in the Bollywood music industry, considered to be the master of fusing Indian music with European classical music concepts of harmony, cadence and obbligato. He is largely responsible for changing the entire harmonic structure of the Hindi film song to create an extremely listenable full body of sound behind the voice of the singer.

Sebastian was very competent in creating counter-melody which became popular from 1950 onwards and Sebastian became a well-known and the most wanted Music Arranger of many music directors of Hindi Film industry. Since 1951 till 1975, he was a permanent Assistant to Shankar–Jaikishan along with Datta Ram.

== Bollywood career ==
He started his career as a Music Arranger in 1948–49 with O. P. Nayyar. Sebastian's role got noticed during the making of Raj Kapoor's Aawara (1951).

Providing violin obbligato at the background, preparing counter melodies for the bass cello, use of choir techniques in employing voices in Indian chorus singing, sparing but significant use of sonorous church organ, refining cordial harmonies suitable for Indian composers could be noted as features of Sebastian's contribution to the Hindi film music

== Arrangement discography ==
Song	Film	Arranged For
Mera Naam Chin Chin Chu	Howrah Bridge (1958)	O.P.Nayyar
Sun Sun Sun Sun Zalima	Mr. & Mrs. '55 (1955)	O.P.Nayyar
Aap Ke Haseen Rukh	Baharen Phir Bhi Aayengi (1966)	O.P.Nayyar
Banda Parwar	Phir Wohi Dil Laya Hoon (1963)	O.P.Nayyar
Raat Ke Humsafar	An Evening in Paris (1967)	Shankar Jaikishan
Yeh Raat Bheegi Bheegi	Chori Chori (1956)	Shankar Jaikishan
Aaja Sanam Madhur Chandni Mein Hum	Chori Chori (1956)	Shankar Jaikishan
Tera Jaana	Anari (1959)	Shankar Jaikishan
Ae Maalik Tere Bande Hum	Do Aankhen Barah Haath (1957)	Vasant Desai
Aaja Re Pardesi	Madhumati (1958)	Salil Chowdhury
Ajib Daastan Hai Yeh	Dil Apna Aur Preet Parai (1960)	Shankar Jaikishan
Ae Mere Dil Kahi Aur Chal	Daag (1952)	Shankar Jaikishan
Jeena Yahan Marna Yaha	Mera Naam Joker (1970)	Shankar Jaikishan
Yeh Mera Prem Patra	Sangam (1964)	Shankar Jaikishan
Tujhe Jeevan Ki Dor	Asli-Naqli (1962)	Shankar Jaikishan
Tera Mera Pyaar Amar	Asli-Naqli (1962)	Shankar Jaikishan
