= Naseem (film) =

- Poster
- Directed by: Saeed Akhtar Mirza
- Written by: Saeed Akhtar Mirza
- Screenplay by: Saeed Akhtar Mirza; Ashok Mishra
- Produced by: NFDC
- Starring: Mayuri Kango; Kaifi Azmi; Kay Kay Menon; Surekha Sikri; Kulbhushan Kharbanda; Makrand Deshpande
- Cinematography: Virendra Saini
- Edited by: Javed Sayyed
- Music by: Vanraj Bhatia; Sharang Dev
- Release date: 1995
- Running time: 89 minutes
- Country: India
- Language: Hindi

Naseem (transl. The Morning Breeze) is a 1995 Hindi film directed by Saeed Akhtar Mirza. The film starred well-known Urdu poet Kaifi Azmi, Mayuri Kango, Seema Kelkar, Surekha Sikri, Kulbhushan Kharbanda and Kay Kay Menon.

== Plot ==
The film is set between June and December 1992, the days preceding the infamous demolition of the structure of Babri Masjid at Ayodhya in the Indian province of Uttar Pradesh by groups. The relationship between Naseem, a 15-year-old schoolgirl belonging to a middle class Bombay based Muslim family and her ailing grandfather takes the story forward as the family watches with increasing horror on their TV the news of the growing tension between Muslims and Hindus. The grandfather keeps regaling her with stories of life marked by communal harmony in the pre-independence city of Agra. As communal tension erupts in the city of Bombay, Naseem notices changing dynamics at her school and in the neighborhood, while her grandfather watches helplessly at a city getting deeply divided on communal lines. The old man dies on 6 December coinciding with the news of the destruction of the mosque.

== Cast ==
- Mayuri Kango as Naseem
- Kaifi Azmi as Naseem's Grandfather
- Seema Kelkar as Naseem's Grandmother
- Kay Kay Menon as Zafar
- Salim Shah as Mushtaq
- Makrand Deshpande
- Kulbhushan Kharbanda as Naseem's Father
- Surekha Sikri as Naseem's Mother

== Reception ==
Reviewing the film at the Indian Panorama section of the International Film Festival of India, S. R. Ashok Kumar of The Hindu wrote that "Mayoori Kango as Naseem has excelled in acting in quite a number of scenes. The director Saeed Akthar Mirza has done his home work properly. The film is the pick among the Panorama selections".

== Accolades ==
The film won National Award for Best Direction and Best Screenplay for Saeed Akhtar Mirza.
