= Bazaar (1982 film) =

1982 film

- Film poster
- Directed by: Sagar Sarhadi
- Written by: Ibrahim Rungala
- Produced by: Vijay Talwar
- Starring: Farooq Shaikh; Smita Patil; Naseeruddin Shah
- Cinematography: Ishan Arya
- Edited by: S. Chakravarty
- Music by: Khayyam
- Release date: 21 May 1982 (India)
- Running time: 121 minutes
- Country: India
- Languages: Hindi; Urdu

Bazaar (transl. Market) is a 1982 Indian drama film directed by Sagar Sarhadi and starring Naseeruddin Shah, Farooq Shaikh, Smita Patil and Supriya Pathak. The film set in Hyderabad, India, highlights the issue of bride buying in India, through the tragedy of a young girl being sold by needy parents to affluent expatriate Indians in the Gulf.

== Plot ==
The movie opens with Najma (Smita Patil) decking herself up in a flat in Mumbai. She soon entertains a guest, Akhtar Hussain, who turns out to be her love interest. He talks of an argument at his house with his father who had asked him to marry the daughter of an affluent cement factory owner. Akhtar claims that he refused the offer and had told his father that he will marry the woman of his choice. At being asked by Najma about when they would get married, Akhtar reveals that in order to marry against the wishes of the family it is necessary that he start earning his own living. He further assures the crestfallen Najma that one Shakir Khan, a middle-aged man working in the gulf area, who would soon be coming to their place, would help him with the money to set up some business. Najma is apprehensive of Shakir Khan's stay with her but Akhtar says that there is no other way as after all, the flat has been provided for by Shakir Khan himself. As the evening proceeds, it is revealed that Najma has received many letters from her home for the past six years however, she never reads them as she still hasn't forgiven her family for forcing her into selling herself in order to earn some money for the family. She had been willing to engage in some other work but her mother had insisted that the pride of the Nawaabs that they had once been would be tarnished if she becomes a working woman and so it would be better to sell the body instead as it is only for a night and can be accomplished secretly. As Akhtar spends the night at Najma's, she remembers how on one of his visits Akhtar had offered to take her with him with a hope of marrying her soon and she too had run away with him.

The next day Najma is visited by Salim, a renowned poet, who has been in love with her for the past six years; however, she hasn't accepted his love. The two share a friendly relationship and are very comfortable with each other. Salim once again reiterates that he often thinks about her and that though he couldn't marry her 6 years ago, he is quite capable of doing so today. Salim tells her that she is living a life of lies as Akhtar only visits her to spend the night and has no intention of marrying her.

Najma and Akhtar receive Shakir Khan at the airport. The next morning Shakir questions Najma on the whereabouts of Akhtar, hinting at the promiscuous nature of their relationship and eyeing Najma the whole time. Najma reaffirms her love for Akhtar at which Shakir says that he always wanted to see her settled and would be happy to help Akhtar in his endeavours. He further expresses his intention to marry a woman like her which leaves her a bit taken aback.

Shakir Khan asks Najma to throw a kind of party in the evening where he separately tells Akhtar of his wish to marry a woman as he misses the comfort of home and family. A flashback shows Shakir Khan having his own wife and children; however, it is apparent that he was abusive and so not welcome in his house. He wants Najma to find him a bride from her home city of Hyderabad. When Akhtar tells Najma of this she finds it revolting, however she agrees to find a beautiful bride for Shakir at the prospect of this deed helping her and Akhtar to set up their life as a couple.

The scene changes to Hyderabad where Sarju and Shabnam fall in love with each-other. Sarju asks Nasreen, who secretly loves Sarju, to help set up a meeting with Shabnam who happens to be her friend. Nasreen is heartbroken but in the face of reality she decides to keep her feelings to herself as both Sarju and Shabnam were much in love. Meanwhile, Najma buys the jewellery and other articles that will be necessary for the wedding, and the wedding party, including the common friend, Salim, departs for Hyderabad. While they travel in the train, a flashback reveals how Salim used to visit Najma at her home in Hyderabad and express his feelings but Najma refused him time and again saying that she is that golden bird for her family whose secret is unknown to him. She says that she cannot marry him and that it would be better that he forget her. She promises to acknowledge him as a friend should their paths ever cross again.

Back in Hyderabad, Shabnam's mother has to let go of a good match for her eldest daughter as she cannot afford to fulfill the demands of the groom's side. Hajjan Bi, the matchmaker, chides Shabnam's mother as in this way they would never find a match; however, she leaves promising to tell her if a good match comes her way. Meanwhile, Najma, now in Hyderabad, sets out in search of a bride. She ends up at a place where the poor are literally showcasing their daughters, hoping to get their young girls, some of whom have barely reached puberty, married in order to receive some amount of money in return. Najma is horrified by this and questions her role in this whole wedding plan. Nonetheless, she decides to visit her family in Hyderabad and finds her mother get all sentimental to see her again. She also meets Sarju, her childhood friend whom she considers her younger brother. He tells her that he has found a girl he wishes to marry. Najma feels very happy and promises to help him get married and that too quite grandly. As she leaves, she comes across Nasreen and asks her if she has come to meet Sarju, to which she replies in the affirmative. Najma ends up thinking that Nasreen is the girl Sarju was talking about.

At a small gathering, consisting of the wedding party from Mumbai, Sarju, Nasreen and Shabnam, Shabnam sings a beautiful song at which Shakir Khan seems quite impressed. He later expresses his wish to marry Shabnam which shocks Najma as Shabnam is quite young and not yet 16. However, Akhtar persuades her to set up the wedding as even if she refuses to, the poor parents will be more than happy to get one of their daughters married to such a rich man. The bride's family accepts the offer but sets up their own demands asking for 5000 rupees for the family (to be used for the elder daughter's marriage) and 101 rupees as bakshish for the matchmaker, Hajjan Bi. With the wedding being set up, Salim is horrified at the whole thing and in a drunken state expresses his anger at how the girls are being sold off to the rich because of poverty. He equates the setting up of the wedding to the system where humans are auctioned. When Sarju gets to know of the wedding, he confronts Shabnam's parents asking them how they could do so knowing that he and Shabnam love each other and that he was working hard to earn a living with the intention of marrying her. He points out that they have auctioned her happiness and swears that he will either not let this wedding take place or destroy himself. On the other hand, Najma is not able to deal with the whole situation and constantly questions her role in it. Salim tells her that marriage is but a socially acceptable way of selling and buying humans and that she too has been a victim of a similar market. He tells her that as long as she is dependent on a man she will be just a toy, only when she stands on her own feet will she become her own person, with her separate identity. At that point, Sarju comes over to Najma and tells her that she had set up the love of his life with Shakir Khan. Najma feels terrible and tries to get the wedding cancelled but to no avail. She breaks down and apologizes for messing it up. Sarju takes matters into his own hands and pleads Shakir Khan to break off the wedding, relating all his troubles, but only gets thrashed by him in return with Akhtar and some of the others from the wedding party as mute spectators.

Shabnam is revolted by the relationship her family had set up but has no choice. She pleads not to get married but all her pleas fall on deaf ears. She goes to the mazaar and unties the thread which she had once tied with the wish to have Sarju as her husband. She points out that she had asked for life when she had tied this thread of wish at the mazaar but now only takes back the dead body of all her wishes. Sarju meets Shabnam for the last time with the help of Nasreen and the two feel sorrowful at the turn of events. Shabnam marries Shakir Khan. Salim decides to go back to Mumbai while Najma plans to stay put. She rejects Akhtar, who was quite elated as now it meant that Shakir Khan would surely help him set up a good life. Najma points out that if he could commit such a thing for money then he could perhaps also sell her off one day for his benefit. Akhtar breaks down and says that he will be destroyed without her, to which she replies that he has already destroyed himself by being a pawn in Shakir Khan's endeavours. On the wedding night, Shakir Khan finds his new bride dead on the bridal bed. Shabnam had committed suicide by poisoning herself. Sarju is heartbroken at the news. Najma feels guilty and catches the train to Mumbai through which Salim was leaving. She faces Salim and relates the news of Shabnam's death at the end of which she owns up to being a part of this unfairness, this crime.

== Cast ==
- Smita Patil as Najma
- Naseeruddin Shah as Salim
- Farooq Shaikh as Sarju
- Supriya Pathak as Shabnam
- Bharat Kapoor as Akhtar Hussain
- B. L. Chopra as Shakir Ali Khan
- Neesha Singh as Nasreen
- Malika as Najma's mother
- Sulabha Deshpande as Shabnam's mother
- Ram Mohan as Shabnam's father
- Yunus Parvez as Shabnam's mamu
- Shaukat Kaifi as match maker woman
- Javed Khan Amrohi as Najma's friend
- Rita Rani Kaul as Najma's friend
- Aanjjan Srivastav as jeweller
- Tabu as girl in 'Chalo Aao Saiyaan' (uncredited)

== Soundtrack ==
All music is composed by Khayyam

No.	Title	Lyrics	Singer(s)	Length
1.	"Dekh Lo Aaj Humko Jee Bharke"	Mirza Shauq	Jagjit Kaur
2.	"Dikhayee Diye Yun"	Mir Taqi Mir	Lata Mangeshkar
3.	"Karoge Yaad To Har Baat" (Raga Shivaranjani)	Bashar Nawaz	Bhupinder Singh
4.	"Phir Chiddi Raat" (Raga Bageshri)	Makhdoom Mohiuddin	Lata Mangeshkar, Talat Aziz
5.	"Chale Aao Saiyan"	Jagjit Kaur	Pamela Chopra

Nearly a decade after the film's release, the song Karoge Yaad To Har Baat Yaad Aayegi was used in the 1995 album Saadgi.

In the beginning we hear a song "Hum unhein mata-e-koocha-o-bazar ki tarah" which is from the classic movie Dastak (1970 film)

In the party scene an old classic disco number 'Black is black' by Cerrone is heard playing.

== Awards ==
Year	Award	Category	Recipient(s)	Result
1983	Filmfare Awards	Best Film	Vijay Talwar	Nominated
1983	Filmfare Awards	Best Director	Sagar Sarhadi	Nominated
1983	Filmfare Awards	Best Story	Sagar Sarhadi	Nominated
1983	Filmfare Awards	Best Actor	Naseeruddin Shah	Nominated
1983	Filmfare Awards	Best Actress	Smita Patil	Nominated
1983	Filmfare Awards	Beat Supporting Actress	Supriya Pathak	Won
1983	Filmfare Awards	Best Music Director	Khayyam	Nominated

== See also ==
- Ameena case, 1991 case of bride buying from Hyderabad
