= Faslah =

- Directed by: Khwaja Ahmad Abbas
- Written by: Khwaja Ahmad Abbas
- Produced by: Khwaja Ahmad Abbas
- Starring: Raman Khanna
- Cinematography: S. Ramachandra
- Edited by: Mohan Rathod
- Music by: Jaidev
- Release date: 1974
- Running time: 153 mins
- Country: India
- Language: Hindi

Faslah is a 1974 Bollywood drama film directed by Khwaja Ahmad Abbas. The film stars Raman Khanna.

== Cast ==
- Raman Khanna as Gautam Swarup Chandra
- Shabana Azmi as Asha Premchand
- Nadira as Mrs. Sonachand
- Paintal
- Yunus Parvez as Editor
- P. Jairaj
- Vinod Mehra as Vinod (Gautam's Friend)
- Imtiaz Khan as Gopal 'Gogi'
- Komilla Wirk as Maya
- David Abraham as Sharma (as David)
- Shaukat Azmi as Parvati S. Chandra (as Shaukat Kaifi)
- Manmauji
- Moolchand as Phoolchand – Prison inmate (as Mulchand)
- Dinesh Thakur as Comrade Kranti – Prison inmate
- Chand Usmani as Radha Chandra
- Vijay Ganju as Advocate Bakshi
- Helen as Dancer / Singer at Club

== Soundtrack ==
No.	Title	Singer(s)	Length
1.	"Aa Utha Le Apna Jaam"	Ranu Mukherjee (as Rano Mukherji)	3:12
2.	"Dil Ne Tadap Tadap Ke"	Bhupinder Singh (as Bhupendra)	3:26
3.	"Nigahen Churao Na Daman Chhurao"	Bhupinder Singh, Minoo Purshottam	3:07
4.	"Zindagi Cigarette Ka Dhuan"	Bhupinder Singh	3:27
