= Anjuman (1986 film) =

1986 Hindi drama film directed by Muzaffar Ali

- Directed by: Muzaffar Ali
- Screenplay by: Muzaffar Ali
- Story by: Muzaffar Ali
- Produced by: Muzaffar Ali
- Starring: Shabana Azmi; Farooque Shaikh; Rohini Hattangadi
- Cinematography: Ishan Arya
- Music by: Khayyam; Shahryar (lyrics)
- Release date: 1986
- Country: India
- Languages: Hindi; Urdu

Anjuman (English: Congregation) is a 1986 Hindi drama film directed by Muzaffar Ali, starring Shabana Azmi, Farooque Shaikh and Rohini Hattangadi in lead roles. Set in Lucknow, it deals with exploitation of women and problems of local "chikan" embroidery workers.

Anjuman has music by Khayyam, with lyrics by noted Urdu poet Shahryar, with three songs sung by lead actress Shabana Azmi, who agreed to do playback singing. Noted actor Farooque Shaikh worked in three films with Muzaffar Ali, with the others being Gaman (1978) and Umrao Jaan (1981).

== Plot ==
Set in the old city of Lucknow, Anjuman follows the story of Anjuman (Shabana Azmi), a young chikan embroidery worker who supports her family after her father abandons them. Working under exploitative traders who control the embroidery business, she becomes aware of the deep-rooted injustice faced by women artisans.

Encouraged by Dr. Suchitra (Rohini Hattangadi), a progressive eye specialist, and supported by her kind-hearted neighbour Sajid (Farooque Shaikh), Anjuman transforms from a quiet worker into a voice of resistance. Her activism for fair wages and dignity provokes powerful interests, including the manipulative trader Banke Nawab (Mushtaq Khan), who seeks to silence her through deceit and coercion.

When pressured into marrying Banke Nawab for her family’s survival, Anjuman publicly rejects the union, asserting her self-respect and independence. The film ends with her continuing the struggle for justice, symbolising the awakening of women’s empowerment within traditional society.

== Cast ==
- Shabana Azmi as Anjuman
- Farooq Shaikh as Sajid (Sajju)
- Rohini Hattangadi as Dr. Suchitra Sharma
- Mushtaq Khan as Banke Nawab
- Shaukat Azmi

== Production ==
Much of the film was shot in old Lucknow, and principal cinematography was done by Ishan Arya. The film also marked a notable moment when lead actress Shabana Azmi agreed to sing her own playback songs under composer Khayyam. Also with lyrics by Shahryar, the film's director continued a creative partnership first seen in Ali’s Umrao Jaan (1981).

== Music ==
The music was by Khayyam, with lyrics by Shahryar and Faiz Ahmad Faiz, with three song sung by Shabana Azmi, a rare feat for her career.

- "Kab Yaad Me Tera Saath Nahin" — Jagjit Kaur, Khayyam
- "Main Raah Kab Se Nayi Zindagi Ki" — Shabana Azmi
- "Tujhse Hoti Bhi To Kya" — Shabana Azmi
- "Aisa Nahin Ki Isko" — Shabana Azmi
- "Gulab Jism Ka" — Bhupinder Singh, Shabana Azmi
