= Baba Azmi =

Indian cinematographer

- Born: Azamgarh, Uttar Pradesh, India
- Occupation: Cinematographer
- Spouse: Tanvi Azmi
- Parents: Kaifi Azmi; Shaukat Kaifi
- Relatives: Shabana Azmi (sister); Ishan Arya (first-cousin)
- Family: Azmi family

Sayyid Baba Azmi is an Indian film cinematographer and member of the Akhtar-Azmi film family. He is son of the poet and lyricist Kaifi Azmi and brother of Shabana Azmi. He is known for his work in films such as Arjun, Beta, Dil, Tezaab, Mr. India, Akele Hum Akele Tum and Pukar.

He started his career in mid 1970s, assisting Ishan Arya his first cousin, in Telugu films, starting as light boy. He worked with Arya for a few Telugu films, before he got an independent break. In 2020, he made his directorial debut with the film Mee Raqsam starring Naseeruddin Shah. It was released on 21 August 2020 on Zee5.
