= J. P. Kaushik =

Hindi cinema music director

J. P. Kaushik was a music director in the Hindi film industry. He composed music/songs for over 50 Hindi, Haryanvi, Rajasthani and English films.

Kaushik died, aged 93, on 14 March 2017.

== Filmography ==
=== Hindi ===
- Shehar Aur Sapna (1963), produced and directed by K. A. Abbas
- Hamara Ghar (1964), produced and directed by K. A. Abbas
- Aasmaan Mahal (1965), produced and directed by K. A. Abbas
- Bambai Raat Ki Bahon Mein (1968), produced and directed by K. A. Abbas
- Saat Hindustani (1969), produced and directed by K. A. Abbas
- Basti Aur Bazar (1973), produced and directed by Rajdeep
- Dhamaka (1980), produced by Sukhdev Dhamija, directed by Jagdish
- Sister (1980), produced by Harish Kataria, directed by Rajdeep
- Saanjhi (1985), produced by Sumitra-Satish, directed by Pradeep Hooda

In addition, his Hindi films included:

- Aankhin Dekhi, which was censored in 1978 but not released. It was written, produced and directed by Rajinder Singh Bedi
- Adhura Milan ( Incomplete ) Anisha Productions P Ltd...Songs were penned down by Anu Vikshat and sung by Mahendra Kapoor..Nitin Mukesh..Bhupender Singh ( Bhupendra ) Dilraj Kaur ..Bhal Singh and Ved Saini.
- Kishti Lagi Kinaare was incomplete
- Bandar Mera Saathi, produced by Indian Film Children Society
- Lav Kush, produced by Indian Film Children Society

=== Gujarati ===
- Maari Laaj Rakhje Veera

=== Rajasthani ===
- Dharam Bhai
- Laado Rani

=== Haryanvi ===
- Bahurani, produced by Haryanvi Film Co-operative Society, directed by Satish J. Kaushik
- Chandrawal
- Panghat
- Lambardaar
- Dhan Paraya
- Batehoo, directed bySharma
- Phool Badan
- Taqdeer Ki Taqraar
- Laaddo Basanti
- Bairi
- Chandrakiran
- Chhori Sapele Ki
- Chhori Natt Ki. produced by Anurag Sharma, directed by Jack Gaud
- Kunbaa

=== Television ===
- Madhurima
- Insaani Rishton Ka Safar
- Anmol Rattan
- Officer On Special Duty

=== Documentaries ===
- Pageants Of India
- Tales Of Four Cities
- Sumitra Nandan Pant
