= Naina (1973 film) =

- DVD of Shemaroo
- Directed by: Kanak Mishra
- Written by: Kaifi Azmi
- Produced by: Babubhai Shah
- Starring: Shashi Kapoor; Moushumi Chatterjee; Rehman; Padma Khanna; David Abraham; Rajshree
- Music by: Shankar-Jaikishan; Lyrics by Hasrat Jaipuri; Indeevar; Kaifi Azmi
- Distributed by: Shakti International
- Release date: 1973
- Running time: 135 minute
- Country: India
- Language: Hindi

Naina is a 1973 Bollywood film directed by Kanak Mishra. The song "Hone Lagi Hai Raat Jawan", sung by Asha Bhosle, earned her the 5th Filmfare award. The music was composed by Shankar-Jaikishan.

The movie has similarities with Daphne du Maurier's 1938 novel Rebecca and features Shashi Kapoor in a rare negative role as a high-born aristocrat. Moushumi Chatterjee plays his second wife, who is constantly being compared with his first (Rajshree).

== Cast ==
- Shashi Kapoor as Ravi Verma
- Rajshree Shantaram as Naina, Ravi's first wife (deceased)
- Moushumi Chatterjee as Jyoti, Ravi's 2nd wife
- Rehman as Raja Bansi Lal Berma, Ravi's father
- Padma Khanna
- David Abraham Cheulkar

== Soundtrack ==
Naina

Studio album by Shankar-Jaikishan
- Released: 1973
- Genre: Feature film soundtrack
- Label: Odeon
- Producer: Babubhai Shah

The music was composed by Shankar-Jaikishan and the lyrics were by Hasrat Jaipuri, Indeevar and Kaifi Azmi.

Original Motion Pictures
Track	Song	Singer(s)	Lyric
1	"Jane Mujhe Tune Ye Kya Cheez"	Kishore Kumar & Sharda	Indeevar
2	"Mujhe Tu Ne Maar Dala"	Mohammed Rafi	Hasrat Jaipuri
3	"Albele Sanam Tu Laya Hai Kahan"	Sharda	Hasrat Jaipuri
4	"Humko To Jaan Se Pyari Hai"	Mohammed Rafi	Hasrat Jaipuri
5	"Hone Lagi Hai Raat Jawan"	Asha Bhosle	Kaifi Azmi
6	"Mann Ke Panchi"	Sharda	Hasrat Jaipuri
7	"Ae Mere Dil To Bahut Door Kahin Bhi Le Chal"	Mohammed Rafi

== Awards and nominations ==
- Nomination Filmfare Award for Best Male Playback Singer – Mohd. Rafi for the song "Humko To Jaan Se Pyari Hai"
- Filmfare Award for Best Female Playback Singer – Asha Bhosle for the song "Hone Lagi Hai Raat Jawan"
