= Nasihat =

- Directed by: Aravind Sen
- Written by: Story: Prafulla Roy; Screenplay: Suhrid Kar; Dialogues: Kader Khan
- Produced by: Aarvind Sen
- Starring: Rajesh Khanna; Shabana Azmi; Mithun Chakraborty; Deepti Naval
- Cinematography: Ishan Arya
- Edited by: Ramesh Pai
- Music by: Kalyanji Anandji
- Production company: Lalit Kala Mandir
- Release date: 25 July 1986
- Running time: 155 minutes
- Country: India
- Language: Hindi

Nasihat is a 1986 Hindi film directed and produced by Aravind Sen. Rajesh Khanna, Shabana Azmi play the lead roles and supported by Mithun Chakraborty and Deepti Naval. The film was a Silver jubilee hit at the time of its release.

== Plot ==
Indrani, daughter of multimillionaire Seth Ratanlal, falls in love with honest Dinesh and wants to marry him. On finding out about this, and cunning employee Mohanlal, who has his eye on the business as well as Indrani starts poisoning the mind of Seth Ratanlal. When Seth Ratanlal confronts Indrani, she admits her involvement with Dinesh and that she is pregnant with Dinesh's child. Mohanlal hires goons to beat up, kidnap and imprison Dinesh. He tells Seth Ratanlal that Dinesh has absconded to London and that his promise to marry Indrani was fake.

In a bid to overcome the pregnancy stigma Seth Ratanlal temporarily leaves the city with his daughter after handing his business to Mohanlal. When accountant Jagdish, exposes the fraud, Mohanlal tries to get him killed in a truck accident. On returning, Seth Ratan Lal finds out that Mohanlal has taken over his businesses for good. Unable to do anything else about it, Indrani is also compelled to marry Mohanlal.

Years pass by. Rajesh, son of Jagdish, is grown up and has vowed to avenge his father's death. Sunita (Indrani and Dinesh's deserted daughter) works as private secretary to Mohanlal. Rajesh and Sunita fall in love. Sunita pledges her support to Rajesh in his quest to destroy Mohanlal but when Sunita finds out that Indrani is her mother, it drives a wedge between them. Mohanlal's son Randhir is helpful to the poor and different in character to his father. When he gets union leader Bajrangi released from the jail he finds out that he is not Mohanlal's son. Rajesh, Sunita and Randhir unite to defeat common enemy Mohanlal.

== Cast ==
- Rajesh Khanna as Rajesh Verma
- Shabana Azmi as Sunita
- Mithun Chakraborty as Randhir
- Deepti Naval as Deepti
- Tanuja as Indrani
- Amjad Khan as Bajrangi
- Kader Khan as Mohanlal
- Satyendra Kapoor as Ratanlal
- Shriram Lagoo as SK Nanda
- Aruna Irani as Champa
- Dinesh Hingoo as Hingoo
- Krishnakant as Niranjan
- Shubha Khote as Maya
- Dinesh Thakur as Dinesh

== Music ==
1. "Tere Mere Pyar Ki Kundali" – Kishore Kumar, Hemalata
2. "Zindagi Hai Kitne Din Ki" – Kishore Kumar, Asha Bhosle
3. "Tum Bahut Haseen Sahi" – Kishore Kumar, Alka Yagnik
4. "Jhunak Jhunak Jhanjhar Baaje" – Kishore Kumar, Mahendra Kapoor, Alka Yagnik
5. "Mera Mann Dekhe Sapna" – Sadhana Sargam
6. "Yeh Hawaayein Sard Sard Hain" – Suresh Wadkar, Asha Bhosle
