= Seven Bungalows =

सात बंगला Saat Bangla
- Neighbourhood
- Location within Mumbai
- Coordinates: 19.129052°N 72.817018°E
- Country: India
- State: Maharashtra
- District: Mumbai Suburban
- City: Mumbai

Government
  - Type: Municipal Corporation
  - Body: Brihanmumbai Municipal Corporation (MCGM) K-West Ward
- Time zone: UTC+5:30 (IST)
- PIN: 400053
- Area code: 022
- Vehicle registration: MH-02

Saat Bangla also known as Seven Bungalows is a neighbourhood in Versova, Andheri, Mumbai.

== History and etymology ==
The area is said to derive its name from seven bungalows owned by then country's who's who – the Maharaja of Gwalior, the Maharaja of Kutch, Dadabhai Naoroji, Sir Rustom Masani, Sorabjee Talati, the Khambatta's and the Chinai's. Of which now only the bungalow of Chinai's built in the 1930s by Claude Batley, a British architect, for Maneklal Chunilal Chinai, a wealthy textile merchant, remains in its originality.

== Parks ==
There are two parks in the locality. The first one is the Dadabhai Navroji Garden, also known as Seven Bungalows Garden, which is maintained by the Municipal Corporation of Greater Mumbai. The other is the Nana Nani Park, located opposite it.

== Transport ==
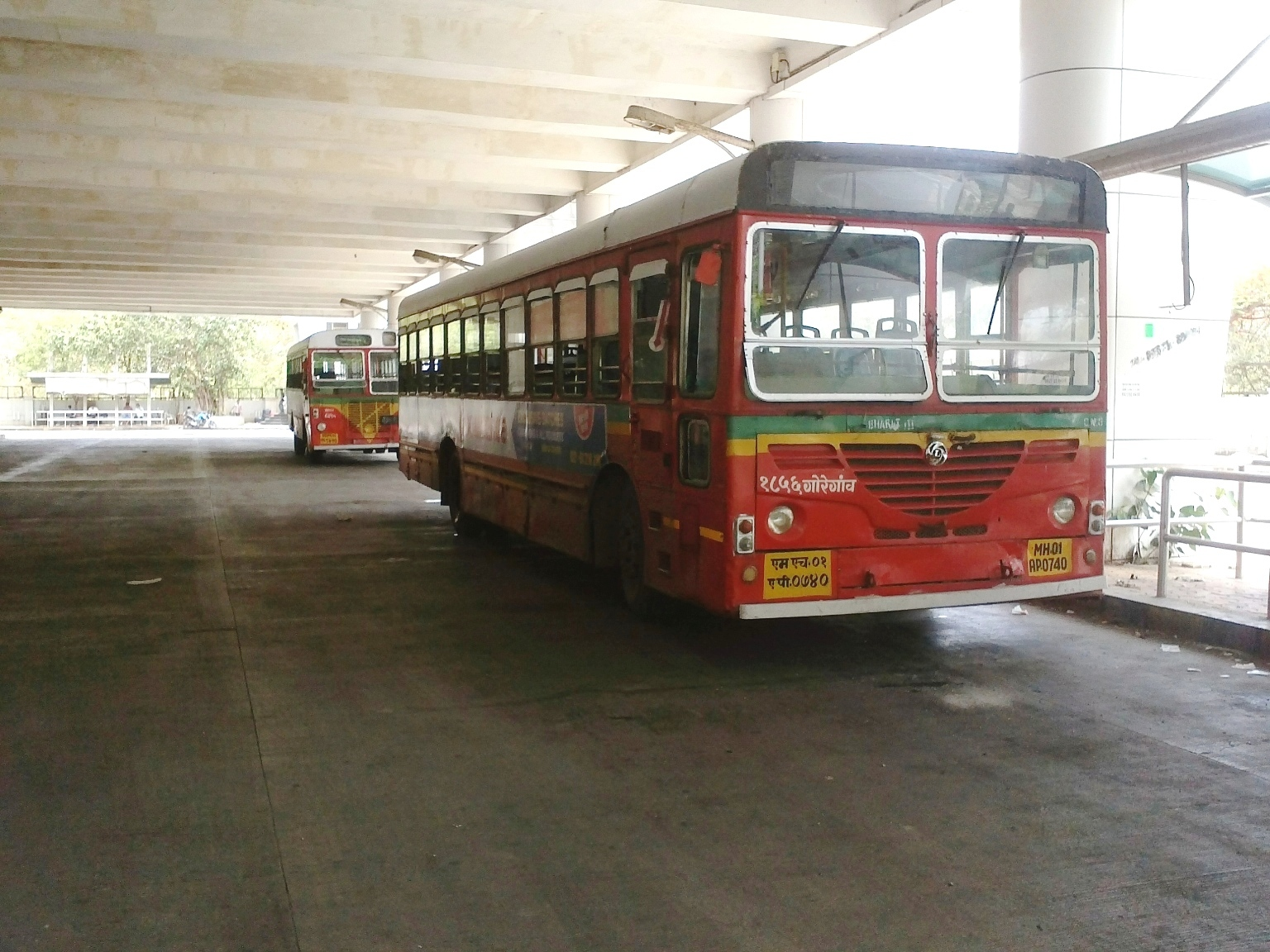
Seven Bungalows Bus Station

The Brihanmumbai Electricity Supply and Transport Undertaking (BEST) operates a bus station at Seven Bungalows. Bus services connect the area with places like Andheri railway station, and Bhayandar railway station.

The western terminal station on Line 1 of the Mumbai Metro, Versova metro station is also located at Seven Bungalows.

Seven Bungalows lies on the arterial Jayaprakash Narayan Road (JP Road) which connects it to Andheri railway station and Versova.
