= Sagar Sarhadi =

Indian writer (1933–2021)

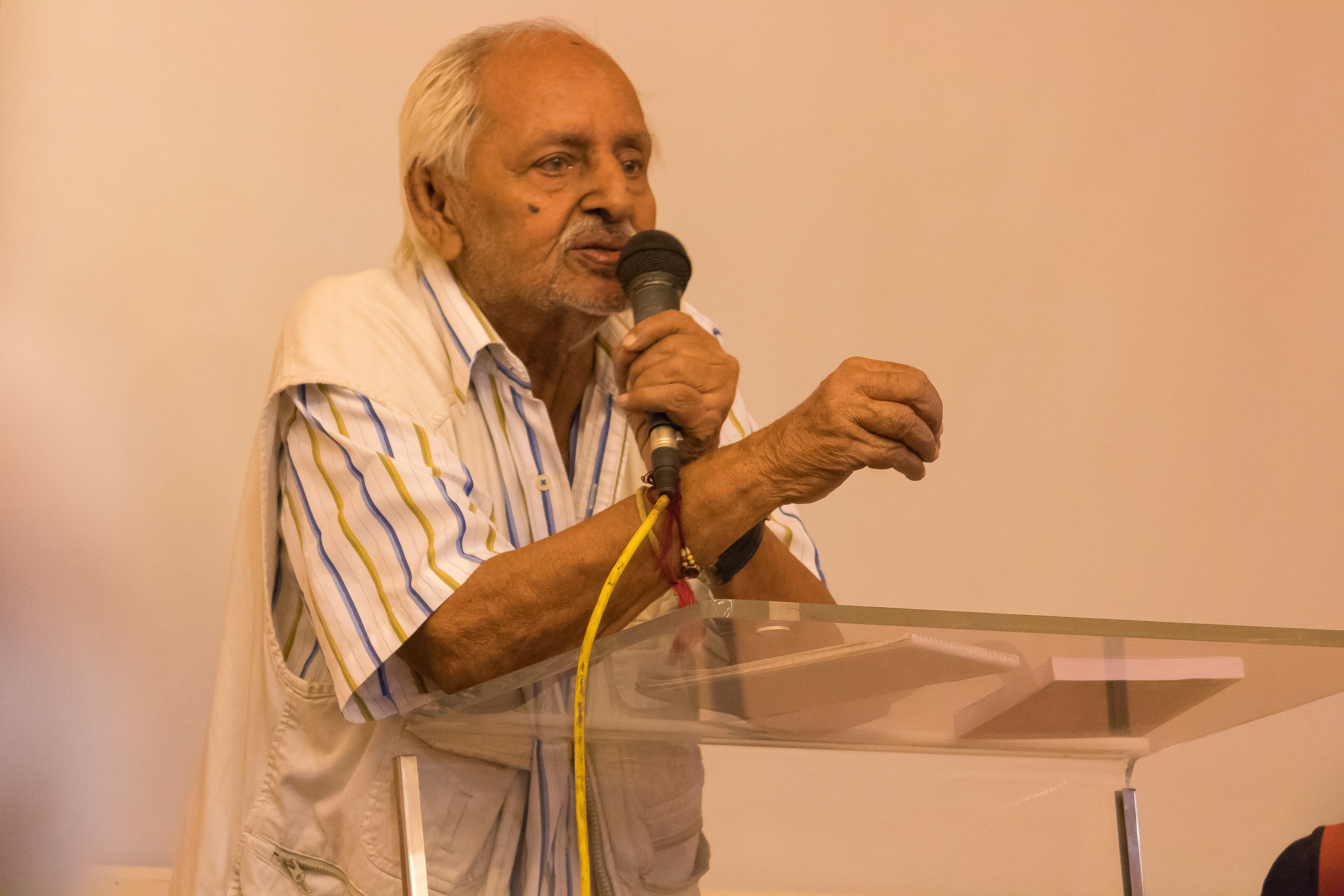
- Born: Ganga Sagar Talwar; 11 May 1933; Abbottabad, Baffa, British India now Baffa, Mansehra district, Khyber Pakhtunkhwa, Pakistan.
- Died: 22 March 2021 (aged 87); Mumbai, India
- Other name: Sagar
- Occupations: short story writer, play writer, film director, film writer, film producer,
- Parents: Than Singh Talwar (father); Prem dai (mother)
- Relatives: Ramesh Talwar (Nephew); 4 brothers, 1 sister

Sagar Sarhadi (11 May 1933 – 22 March 2021) was an Indian short story and play writer, and a writer, director and producer for film. Born in Baffa Pakhal, District Mansehra (then in British India and now in Pakistan), he began writing Urdu short stories and then continued as an Urdu playwright. Sagar Sarhadi was Honored with Lifetime Achievement Award at ICA - International Cultural Artifact Film Festival in 2019 by Ashghar Wajahat.

He became popular in films with Yash Chopra's Kabhi Kabhi (1976), starring Amitabh Bachchan and Raakhee. He went on to write for films including Noorie (1979); Silsila (1981) starring Shashi Kapoor, Amitabh Bachchan, Jaya Bhaduri and Rekha; Chandni (1989) starring Rishi Kapoor, Sridevi and Vinod Khanna; Faasle starring Sunil Dutt, Rekha, Farooq Shaikh and Deepti Naval; Rang (1993) starring Kamal Sadanah and Divya Bharti and directed by Talat Jani; Anubhav starring Sanjeev Kumar and Tanuja and directed by Basu Bhattacharya; Zindagi (1976); The Other Man; Karmayogi; Kaho Naa... Pyaar Hai; Karobaar; Bazaar; Chausar and became a well known name as a scriptwriter.

== Filmography ==
- Goonj (1974) --(Dialogues)
- Alingan (1974) --(Dialogues)
- Kabhi Kabhi (1976 film) (screenplay/dialogue) starring Amitabh Bachchan and Raakhee
- Noorie (1979 film) (screenplay/dialogue) starring Farooq Sheikh and Poonam Dhillon
- Chandni (translation: "Moonlight") (1989 film) (dialogue) starring Rishi Kapoor, Sridevi and Vinod Khanna
- Silsila (translation: "The Affair") (1981 film) (screenplay) starring Shashi Kapoor, Amitabh Bachchan, Jaya Bhaduri and Rekha
- Bazaar (1982 film) (direction) starring Naseeruddin Shah, Farooq Sheikh, Smita Patil, Supriya Pathak and Bharat Kapoor
- Faasle (translation: "Distance") (1995 film) (dialogue) starring Sunil Dutt, Rekha, Farooq Shaikh and Deepti Naval
