= Kolkata in the media =

Media depicting Indian city

Several fiction, non-fiction and cinemas were based on Kolkata or depicted Kolkata from certain point of views. Some of such works are listed here.

== Travelogues ==
- The Great Railway Bazaar (Paul Theroux)
- Following the Equator (Mark Twain)

== Books ==
- Around the World in Eighty Days
- Calcutta (Geoffrey Moorhouse)
- City of the Dreadful Night and American Tales (Rudyard Kipling) - Where Kolkata is called as the titular city
- City of Joy (Dominique Lapierre) - a slum within Kolkata is called the City of Joy
- Calcutta: The Living City Volumes 1 & 2 (ed. Sukanta Chaudhuri)
- Calcutta - City of Palaces: A Survey of the City in the Days of the East India Company 1690–1858. (Jeremiah P. Losty)
- Calcutta 1981 (ed. Jean Racine)

== Films set in Kolkata ==
=== Bengali films ===
- Nagarik - The Citizen (Ritwik Ghatak) (1952 - Released 1977)
- Bari Theke Paliye - The Runaway (Ritwik Ghatak) (1958)
- Mahanagar - The Big City (Satyajit Ray) (1963)
- Apanjan - (Tapan Sinha) (1968)
- Pratidwandi - The Adversary (Satyajit Ray) (1970)
- Seemabaddha - Company Limited (Satyajit Ray) (1971)
- Interview (Mrinal Sen) (1971)
- Calcutta 71 (Mrinal Sen) (1972)
- Padatik - The Guerilla Fighter (Mrinal Sen) (1973)
- Jukti Takko Aar Gappo - Logic, Debate and Story (Ritwik Ghatak) (1974)
- Jana Aranya - The Middleman (Satyajit Ray) (1976)
- Ek Din Pratidin - And Quiet Rolls the Day (Mrinal Sen) (1979)
- Grihajuddha - Crossroads (Buddhadev Dasgupta) (1982)
- Paroma - The Ultimate Woman Aparna Sen (1984)
- Agantuk - The Stranger (Satyajit Ray) (1991)
- Antareen - The Confined (Mrinal Sen) (1993)
- Unishe April - Nineteenth April(Rituparno Ghosh) (1994)
- Dahan - Crossfire (Rituparno Ghosh) (1997)
- Chokher Bali - Sand in the Eye (Rituparno Ghosh) (2003)
- Kaalbela - Calcutta My Love (Goutam Ghose) (2009)
- Houseful (Bappaditya Bandopadhyay (2009)
- Mahanagar@Kolkata (Suman Mukhopadhyay) (2009)
- 033 (Birsa Dasgupta) (2010)
- Ekti Tarar Khonje - Stars Never Sleep (Abhik Mukhopadhyay) (2010)
- Gorosthaney Sabdhan (Sandip Ray) (2010)
- Autograph (Srijit Mukherji) (2010)

=== English films ===
- The River (Jean Renoir)
- 36 Chowringhee Lane (Aparna Sen)
- City of Joy (Roland Joffe)
- Citi Life - Calcutta My El Dorado (Mrinal Sen)
- 10 Days in Calcutta (Gerhard Hauff)
- Bow Barracks Forever (Anjan Dutt)
- Call Cutta (Anjan Dutt)
- 15 Park Avenue (Aparna Sen)
- The Waiting City - According to the production notes the city acts as a character showing its colonial history and ancient historical relics
- The Last Lear
- In The Avengers, Bruce Banner hides out in Kolkata, where Natasha Romanoff recruits him into the Avengers.
- Memories in March
- Lion starring Dev Patel and Nicole Kidman
- The Namesake

=== French films ===
- Calcutta (Louis Malle)
- The Bengali Night (La Nuit Bengali)

=== Tamil films ===
Vedalam aadhavan kaththi Vedi Sayanna Varthakal

=== Telugu films ===
- Geetha
- Ragada
- Adhurs
- Naayak
- [[Julayi]
- Yevade Subramanyam
- Businessman (film)
- Rogue
- Padi Padi Leche Manasu
- Uppena
- Shyam Singha Roy
- [Satyabhama]]
- [Amigos]]
- Natasaarvabhowma
- Brahmostavam

=== Malayalam Films ===
- Bhaiyya Bhaiyya
- Calcutta News
- Neelakasham Pachakadal Chuvanna Bhoomi
- [Balyakalasakhi ]]

=== Hindi films ===
- Howrah Bridge
- Pyaasa
- Amar Prem
- Do Bigha Zameen
- Devdas (1955)
- Devdas (2002)
- Ram Teri Ganga Maili
- Calcutta Mail
- Roar: Tigers of the Sundarbans
- Do Anjaane
- Hazaar Chaurasi Ki Maa
- Morning Walk
- Parineeta
- Vicky Donor
- Yuva
- Raincoat
- Kahaani (2012)
- Barfi!
- I Am
- Khushi
- Love Aaj Kal
- Singh vs Kaur 2
- chhup chhup ke
- Mr. and Mrs. Iyer
- Michael by Ribhu Dasgupta
- Lootera
- No One Killed Jessica
- Special 26
- Bullet Raja
- Gunday
- PK
- Prem Ratan Dhan Payo
- Babumoshai Bandookbaaz
- Piku
- Highway
- Detective Byomkesh Bakshy!
- Hamari Adhuri Kahani
- Tamasha
- Te3n
- Kahaani 2
- Do Lafzon Ki Kahani
- Jagga Jasoos
- Pari
- Dhadak
- Bob Biswas
- Bhool Bhulaiyaa
- Bhool Bhulaiyaa 2
- Bhool Bhulaiyaa 3
- Maa 2025
- CID Series
