= Shekhar Chatterjee =

Indian actor

- Shekhar Chatterjee
- Born: 5 May 1924; Calcutta, Bengal Presidency, British India
- Died: 6 April 1990 (Age 65); Calcutta, West Bengal, India
- Occupations: Actor, director
- Years active: 1950–1989

Shekhar Chatterjee (1924–1990) was an Indian actor and film director.

== Career ==
Chatterjee was born in Kolkata in 1924. He began his career in the Bengali theatre in the 1950s. He was associated with a number of leftist theatre groups, including the Communist Party's Indian People's Theatre Association, Utpal Dutt's Little Theatre Group, and Joan Littlewood's Theatre Workshop, as well as his own group, Theatre Unit, which he formed in 1958. As a stage actor he was well known for his Shakespearean roles and for playing Shardul Singh in Dutt's 1965 play Kallol. His directorial work focused on works by German-language playwrights Bertold Brecht, Friedrich Dürrenmatt, Peter Handke, and Franz Xaver Kroetz. Chatterjee's Brecht productions were rarely adapted to a local setting, and while critics unanimously praised this approach as "authentic", his colleague Dutt attacked it for failing to communicate Brecht's political symbolism to an Indian audience.

Chatterjee was also active in Bengali, Indian and world cinema, having acted in nearly a hundred films by the time he was sixty. Among his first credited roles was in Agradoot's 1955 film noir Sabar Uparey; he later had memorable roles in several of Mrinal Sen's films, including Bhuvan Shome, Ek Adhuri Kahani, Chorus, and Mrigayaa. His biggest international role was that of Huseyn Shaheed Suhrawardy in Richard Attenborough's biographical epic Gandhi. Casting director Dolly Thakore recommended Chatterjee for the role after seeing him onstage in Calcutta and noting that he shared Suhrawardy's large stature.

In 1983, Chatterjee directed the film Vasundhara, which was awarded as best Bengali film at the 31st National Film Awards. The Directorate of Film Festivals cited it for "its sincere attempt to depict the struggle against social injustice".

== Filmography ==
=== As actor ===
Year	Title	Role	Notes
1989	Judge Saheb		as Shekhar Chattopadhyay
1989	Nishi Trishna		
1988	Kidnap		
1988	Hirer Shikal		
1987	Raj Purush		as Shekhar Chattopadhyay
1984	Maa		
1984	Rashifal		
1983	Samapti		
1983	Duti Pata		
1982	Gandhi	Suhrawardy	
1981	Abichar		
1978	Anugraham		
1978	Man Abhiman		
1978	Die Zauberwurzel		
1977	Pratima		
1977	Mrigayaa		
1975	Sansar Seemantey		
1975	Raag Anurag		as Shekhar Chattopadhyay
1975	Chorus	Mr. Mukherjee	
1974	Thagini		as Shekhar Chattopadhyay
1974	Debi Chowdhurani	Rangalal	
1974	Sangini		
1974	Mouchak		
1973	Marjina Abdulla	Kashem	
1973	Achena Atithi		
1973	Ali Baba	Captain	as Sekhar Chattopadhyay
1973	Ami Sirajer Begam		
1972	Ek Adhuri Kahani		
1972	Eine unvollendete Geschichte	Nemiar	
1972	Sesh Parba		
1972	Ajker Nayak		
1971	Kuheli	Station master	
1971	Interview		
1970	Ichhapuran		
1969	Bhuvan Shome		as Sekhar Chatterjee
1968	Gar Nasimpur		as Shekhar Chattopadhyay
1967	Der Zoo		as Shekhar Chattopadhyay
1967	Abhishapta Chambal		
1966	Kal Tumi Aleya	Lawyer	
1966	Joradighir Chowdhury Paribar		as Shekhar Chattopadhyay
1965	Ghoom Bhangar Gaan		as Shekhar Chattopadhyay
1965	Rajkanya		
1965	Trishna		
1961	Dakather Hatey Bulu		as Shekhar Chattopadhyay
1962	Abhijaan	Rameshwar	as Shekhar Chattopadhyay
1955	Sabar Uparey		

=== As director ===
Year	Title	Notes
1983	Vasundhara	as Sekhar Chatterjee

=== As screenwriter ===
Year	Title	Notes
1975	Raag Anurag	as Shekhar Chattopadhyay
1973	Basanta Bilap	as Shekhar Chattopadhyay
