= 26th National Film Awards =

Indian film awards for films of 1978

- Awarded for: Best of Indian cinema in 1978
- Awarded by: Directorate of Film Festivals
- Presented on: April 1979
- Official website: dff.nic.in

Highlights
- Best Feature Film: none awarded
- Dadasaheb Phalke Award: Raichand Boral
- Most awards: • Gaman • Parasuram • Thampu (3)

The 26th National Film Awards, presented by Directorate of Film Festivals, the organisation set up by Ministry of Information and Broadcasting, India to felicitate the best of Indian Cinema released in the year 1978. Ceremony took place in April 1979.

== Juries ==
Two different committees were formed for feature films and short films, headed by Chetan Anand and Kironmoy Raha respectively.

- Jury Members: Feature Films
  - Chetan Anand (Chairperson) • Sanjukta Panigrahi • Arvind Kumar • Manohar Shyam Joshi • Hameeduddin Mehmood
  - Vinay Chandra Maudglaya • Bhisham Sahni • Jamuna • Vimla Patil • Satish Alekar • S. L. Bhyrappa • Naa Parthasarthy
  - Nirad N. Mohapatra • G. L. Bhardwaj • Basu Bhattacharya • K. K. Nair
- Jury Members: Short Films
  - Kironmoy Raha (Chairperson) • Aruna Vasudev • M. T. Vasudevan Nair

== Awards ==
Awards were divided into feature films and non-feature films.

=== Lifetime Achievement Award ===
Name of Award	Image	Awardee(s)	Awarded As	Awards
Dadasaheb Phalke Award		Raichand Boral	Music director and Film director	Swarna Kamal, ₹40,000 and a Shawl

=== Feature films ===
Feature films were awarded at All India as well as regional level. For 26th National Film Awards, no film was awarded the President's Gold Medal for the All India Best Feature Film. It is the only year for National Film Awards not to give away this award till now. A Hindi film Gaman, a Bengali film Parashuram and a Malayalam film Thampu won the maximum number of awards (three). Following were the awards given in each category:

==== All India Award ====
Following were the awards given:

Name of Award	Name of Film	Language	Awardee(s)	Cash prize
Best Feature Film with Mass Appeal, Wholesome Entertainment and Aesthetic Value	Ganadevata	Bengali	Producer: Department of Information and Cultural Affairs, Government of West Bengal	Swarna Kamal
Best Feature Film with Mass Appeal, Wholesome Entertainment and Aesthetic Value	Ganadevata	Bengali	Director: Tarun Majumdar	Rajat Kamal
Best Feature Film with Mass Appeal, Wholesome Entertainment and Aesthetic Value	Citation: For brilliant picturisation of modern literary classic. Like the novel, film succeeds in capturing a whole era in transition. Steering clear of both commercial vulgarisation and pretentiousness, the film uses all the cinematic, to effectively communicate to the masses.			
Best Feature Film on National Integration	Grahana	Kannada	Producer: M/s. Harsha Pictures	Rajat Kamal and ₹30,000
Best Feature Film on National Integration	Grahana	Kannada	Director: T. S. Nagabharana	Rajat Kamal and ₹10,000
Best Feature Film on National Integration	Citation: For an honest and bold depiction of caste conflict in rural India. The film starkly brings out the traditional beliefs which grip the entire rural society including the down-trodden putting an extra chain on the poor in addition to their economic helplessness. Cinematically a very powerful film.			
Best Children's Film	Joi Baba Felunath	Bengali	Producer: R. D. Bansal	Swarna Kamal and ₹15,000
Best Children's Film	Joi Baba Felunath	Bengali	Director: Satyajit Ray	Rajat Kamal and ₹10,000
Best Children's Film	Citation: For the wit and craftsmanship used to synthesise a child's world of fantasy with an adult story of crime and detection.			
Best Direction	Thampu	Malayalam	G. Aravindan	Rajat Kamal and ₹20,000
Best Direction	Citation: For creating a truly director's film which effectively brings out the pathos and ennui in the life of village circus artists and their audience.			
Best Screenplay	Grahana	Kannada	• T. S. Ranga • T. S. Nagabharana	Rajat Kamal and ₹5,000 Each
Best Screenplay	Citation: For maintaining taunt narrative line without resorting to melodrama and retaining a firm grip on the central idea in an action packed film.			
Best Actor	Parasuram	Bengali	Arun Mukherjee	Rajat Kamal and ₹10,000
Best Actor	Citation: For using mime, body language, laughter and silence to depict the central character in complete harmony with the overall style of the film.			
Best Actress	Nimajjanam	Telugu	Sharada	Rajat Kamal and ₹10,000
Best Actress	Citation: For a highly restrained performance and a sensitive non-verbal communication.			
Best Child Artist	Ganadevata	Bengali	Kanchan De Biswas	Rajat Kamal and ₹5,000
Best Child Artist	Citation: For being utterly himself.			
Best Cinematography (Color)	Junoon	Hindi	Govind Nihalani	Rajat Kamal and ₹5,000
Best Cinematography (Color)	Citation: For eloquent camera work which is equally effective both in romantic passages and battle sequences. The camera faultlessly brings out all the colour hues in various locations and differing light conditions.			
Best Cinematography (Black and White)	Thampu	Malayalam	Shaji N. Karun	Rajat Kamal and ₹5,000
Best Cinematography (Black and White)	Citation: For using the camera as a silent witness to the ironies of life. The reaction shots of circus audience taken unawares are in the best tradition of cinema-verite camera style.			
Best Sound Recording	Junoon	Hindi	Hitendra Ghosh	Rajat Kamal and ₹5,000
Best Sound Recording	Citation: For clarity, fidelity and precision in recording music, speech and sound effects.			
Best Editing	Parasuram	Bengali	Gangadhar Naskar	Rajat Kamal and ₹5,000
Best Editing	Citation: For his bravura style of editing which is in complete harmony with the highly stylised treatment of the theme by the director.			
Best Music Direction	Gaman	Hindi	Jaidev	Rajat Kamal and ₹10,000
Best Music Direction	Citation: For using the traditional light classical and folk music of U.P. to convey the nostalgia of rural migrants lost in a city. Music in Gaman is an integral part of the film.			
Best Male Playback Singer	Kaadu Kudre ("Kaadu Kudure Odi Banditta")	Kannada	Shimoga Subbanna	Rajat Kamal and ₹10,000
Best Male Playback Singer	Citation: For rendering the theme song "Kaadu Kudure" in a style which is at once vigorous and lyrical.			
Best Female Playback Singer	Gaman ("Aap Ki Yaad Aati Rahi Raat Bhar")	Hindi	Chhaya Ganguly	Rajat Kamal and ₹10,000
Best Female Playback Singer	Citation: For a hauting rendition of Makhdun Mohluddin's famous ghazal "Aap Ki Yaad Aati Rahi Raat Bhar". The chastity of style, the purity of enunciation and the freshness of voice contribute to make it into a memorable song.			
Special Mention	• Parasuram • Gaman	• Bengali • Hindi	• Mrinal Sen (Director) • Muzaffar Ali (Director)	Certificate Only
Special Mention	Citation: For their sensitive treatment of the problem of rural migrants to cities.			

==== Regional Award ====
The awards were given to the best films made in the regional languages of India. For feature films in Bengali, English, Hindi, Kashmiri, Meitei and Punjabi, award for Best Feature Film was not given.

Name of Award	Name of Film	Awardee(s)	Awards
Best Feature Film in Bengali	Dooratwa	Producer: Buddhadeb Dasgupta	Rajat Kamal and ₹10,000
Best Feature Film in Bengali	Dooratwa	Director: Buddhadeb Dasgupta	Rajat Kamal and ₹5,000
Best Feature Film in Bengali	Citation: For a sensitive depiction of a leftist middle class intellectual's marital conflict waiting for a revolution which does not materialise.		
Best Feature Film in Hindi	Kasturi	Producer: Bimal Dutt	Rajat Kamal and ₹5,000
Best Feature Film in Hindi	Kasturi	Director: Bimal Dutt	Rajat Kamal and ₹2,500
Best Feature Film in Hindi	Citation: For a lyrical depiction of the elemental and eternal conflict between science and superstition.		
Best Feature Film in Hindi	Junoon	Producer: Shashi Kapoor	Rajat Kamal and ₹5,000
Best Feature Film in Hindi	Junoon	Director: Shyam Benegal	Rajat Kamal and ₹2,500
Best Feature Film in Hindi	Citation: For overall technical virtuousity and successful evocation of a bygone era.		
Best Feature Film in Kannada	Ondanondu Kaladalli	Producer: L. N. Combines	Rajat Kamal and ₹10,000
Best Feature Film in Kannada	Ondanondu Kaladalli	Director: Girish Karnad	Rajat Kamal and ₹5,000
Best Feature Film in Kannada	Citation: For delineating the code of warrior's ethics in a medieval setting with a modern vision. The film has excellent outdoor photography, high standard of acting and an eye-catching decor.		
Best Feature Film in Malayalam	Thampu	Producer: K. Ravindran Nair	Rajat Kamal and ₹10,000
Best Feature Film in Malayalam	Thampu	Director: G. Aravindan	Rajat Kamal and ₹5,000
Best Feature Film in Malayalam	Citation: For its cinematic virtousity and defiance of all narrative traditions of film making.		
Best Feature Film in Telugu	Nimajjanam	Producer: M/s Red Rose Art Films	Rajat Kamal and ₹10,000
Best Feature Film in Telugu	Nimajjanam	Director: B. S. Narayana	Rajat Kamal and ₹5,000
Best Feature Film in Telugu	Citation: For a simple and restrained depiction of a dramatic theme, involving a woman's violation resulting in suicide.		

=== Non-Feature films ===
Following were the awards given:

==== Short films ====
Name of Award	Name of Film	Language	Awardee(s)	Cash prize
Best Information Film	Rumtek - A Monastery Wrethed In A Hundred Thousand Rainbows	English	Producer: Romesh Sharma	Rajat Kamal and ₹5,000
Best Information Film	Rumtek - A Monastery Wrethed In A Hundred Thousand Rainbows	English	Director: Romesh Sharma	Rajat Kamal and ₹4,000
Best Information Film	Citation: For an outstanding film in which all the elements are so perfectly blended to create an evocative and informative picture of the continuity of life at this beautiful monastery.			
Best Educational / Instructional Film	The Magic Hands	English	Producer: M/s Little Cinema	Rajat Kamal and ₹5,000
Best Educational / Instructional Film	The Magic Hands	English	Director: Santi P. Chowdhury	Rajat Kamal and ₹4,000
Best Educational / Instructional Film	Citation: For the controlled style of the filmmaker which lends special eloquence to the images of the faces and the hands as also the graceful bamboo they work with.			
Best Promotional Film	It Is Indian It Is Good	Hindi	Producer: Films Division	Rajat Kamal and ₹5,000
Best Promotional Film	It Is Indian It Is Good	Hindi	Director: B. D. Garga	Rajat Kamal and ₹4,000
Best Promotional Film	Citation: For an excellent script and direction supported by smooth editing and camera work with music that is judiciously selected and sparingly used. The film provides an imaginative survey of the magnitude, variety and quality of India's export production.			
Best Newsreel Cameraman	Dawn Over Gurais (Indian News Review No. 1568)	English	C. L. Kaul	Rajat Kamal and ₹5,000
Best Newsreel Cameraman	Citation: For the lyrical realism of the camera with its perfectly matched tone and texture.			
Best News Review	Uttar Pradesh Samachar 24	Hindi	Director of Information and Public Relations, U.P.	Rajat Kamal and ₹5,000
Best News Review	Citation: For its genuine effort to make disturbing human document out of the chaos of a frequent natural calamity.			
Special Mention	The Burning Stone	English	Director: Loksen Lavnani for Films Division	Certificate only
Special Mention	Citation: For the sincerity and commitment of the filmmaker in this stark and uncompromising film in which the raw truth is portrayed with no attempt to make it palatable.			Certificate only

=== Awards not given ===
Following were the awards not given as no film was found to be suitable for the award:

- Best Feature Film
- Second Best Feature Film
- Best Story
- Best Film on Family Welfare
- Best Lyrics
- Best Film on Social Documentation
- Best Experimental Film
- Best Animation Film
- President's Silver Medal for Best Feature Film in Assamese
- President's Silver Medal for Best Feature Film in English
- President's Silver Medal for Best Feature Film in Manipuri
- President's Silver Medal for Best Feature Film in Marathi
- President's Silver Medal for Best Feature Film in Oriya
- President's Silver Medal for Best Feature Film in Punjabi
- President's Silver Medal for Best Feature Film in Tamil
