= Satya Bandyopadhyay =

Indian actor

- Born: 1925; Calcutta, Bengal Presidency, British India
- Died: 1997 (aged 71–72); Calcutta, West Bengal, India
- Occupations: Actor; writer
- Years active: 1948–1997
- Spouse: Sabita Bandyopadhyay
- Children: Sudip Banerjee
- Parents: Banamali Bandyopadhyay (father); Charushila Bandyopadhyay (mother)
- Website: www.imdb.com/name/nm0051851/

Satya Bandyopadhyay (1925 – 28 July 1997) was an Indian actor, known for his work in Bengali cinema and theatre. He acted in over 300 movies, in numerous plays and performed frequently on the radio.

== Early life ==
He was born at Kolkata in the year 1925. His parents were Banamali and Charushila. His mother died at a young age. His father also died when he was a teenager. After completing college education from City College, Kolkata, he took up a job at Titagarh paper mill. At this time he was known for his sporting skills on football ground and badminton courts.

== Acting in theatre ==
His acting career started with acting in amateur clubs. Birendra Krishna Bhadra helped him get roles in plays on All India Radio. His first major role was 'Shaheeder Daak', a Gananatya production. He acted in multiple roles in major plays such as Ulka, Saheb Bibi Golam, Adarsha Hindu Hotel, Chowringee, Begum Mary Biswas, Asami Hajir, Manjari Opera and Devi Choudhurani.

He started writing plays and act in them. Most of these plays were very popular, such as Sesh theke shuru, Erao Manush and Nagpash. His most notable play was Nahabat which was a blockbuster of its time. His acting skill in theatre were revered by many prominent contemporary directors and actors. Along with his friend Tarun Kumar Chatterjee, they established Uttam Mancha, a theatre dedicated to Tarun's elder brother and great actor Uttam Kumar.

== Acting in movies ==
His acting career started in late 1940s as a hero in few Bengali movies. Later he established himself as a character artist and became an automatic choice in comedy movies. He has also worked in villainous roles with equal ease. Most famous of those were Charmurti, where he played the iconic character of Ghutghutananda, a role of a criminal with rib tickling lines.

Many great directors such as Satyajit Ray and Mrinal Sen worked with him. His most memorable association was with director Tarun Majumdar with whom he worked in multiple movies.

== Selected filmography ==
Year	Film	Director	Role
1948	Bhuli Nai	Hemen Gupta	
1951	Barjatri	Satyen Bose	
1952	Pasher Bari	Sudhir Mukherjee	
1953	Swashur Bari		
1953	Bansher Kella		
1953	Bou thakuranir hat		Biva's husband
1954	Ladies Seat		
1954	Ei Satyi		
1955	Bhogoban Sree Sree Ramkrishna		
1956	Tonsil	Tapan Sinha	
1956	Sabdhan		
1956	Nagardola		
1956	Gobindadas		
1956	Chor		
1957	Ulka		
1957	Ratri shese		
1957	Ami Boro hobo		
1957	Surer porose		
1965	Mahapurush	Satyajit Ray	Nitai Babu
1966	Nayak	Satyajit Ray	WWWW Sage
1967	Balika Badhu (1967 film)	Tarun Majumdar	
1969	Bibaha Bibhrat	Ashim Bannerjee	
1971	Kuheli	Tarun Majumdar	Dr. Chaudhuri
1971	Calcutta 71	Mrinal Sen	
1973	Shriman Prithviraj	Tarun Majumdar	Rasik's father
1974	Chorus	Mrinal Sen	
1976	Jana Aranya	Satyajit Ray	Somnath's father
1977	Bhola Moira (film)	Piyush Kanti Ganguly	
1978	Charmurti	Umanath Bhattacharya	Swami Ghutghutananda
1979	Ghatkali	Bimal Roy Jr.	
1980	Dadar Kirti	Tarun Majumdar	Paritosh Chatterjee
1981	Akaler Shandhaney	Mrinal Sen	
1982	Amrita Kumbher Sandhane	Dilip Roy	
1986	Tin Purush	Umanath Bhattacharya	
1987	Nadia Nagar		
1992	City of Joy (1992 film)	Roland Joffé	
1996	Damu	Raja Sen	
