= 17th National Film Awards =

Indian ceremony celebrating cinema of 1969

- Awarded for: Best of Indian cinema in 1969
- Awarded by: Ministry of Information and Broadcasting
- Announced on: 30 August 1970
- Presented on: 21 November 1970
- Site: University Centenary Auditorium, Madras
- Official website: dff.nic.in

Highlights
- Best Feature Film: Bhuvan Shome
- Dadasaheb Phalke Award: Devika Rani
- Most awards: Bhuvan Shome (3)

The 17th National Film Awards were presented by the Ministry of Information and Broadcasting of India to facilitate the best of Indian cinema released in 1969. The ceremony took place at University Centenary Auditorium, Madras on 21 November 1970.

At the 17th National Film Awards, a new award was introduced to honour the father of Indian cinema, Dhundiraj Govind Phalke, better known as Dadasaheb Phalke. Named the Dadasaheb Phalke Award, it was introduced to recognise the contribution of film personalities towards the development of Indian cinema. Starting with the 100th anniversary of the birth of Phalke in 1870, the award was awarded annually for this distinguished contribution.

== Juries ==
Six different committees were formed based on the filmmaking sectors in India; along with the award categories, they were mainly based in Bombay, Calcutta and Madras. Another committee for the All India level was also formed, which included some of the members from the regional committees. For the 17th National Film Awards, this central committee was headed by Justice G. D. Khosla.

- Jury Members: Central
  - G. D. Khosla (Chairperson) • Sitaram Kesri • Shiela Vats • A. C. Jalan • Ezra Mir • B. K. Karanjia • Teji Bachchan • I. S. Johar • Haridas Bhattacharjee • U. Visweswar Rao • Sunder Lal Nahata • M. N. Kapur
- Jury Members: Documentary
  - Tara Ali Baig (Chairperson) • Rashid-Ul-Talib • Kapila Vatsyayan • Usha Bhagat • Shanta Gandhi
- Jury Members: Short Films
  - Amrita Pritam (Chairperson) • R. G. Anand • Inder Lal Das
- Jury Regional: Bombay
  - Nissim Ezekiel (Chairperson) • Urmila Kapur • Navin Khandwalla • R. S. Pande • Firoze Rangoonwalla • Bikram Singh • Bal Chhabda • Shatrujit Paul • Buny Talwar • G. P. Shirke
- Jury Regional: Calcutta
  - Amala Shankar (Chairperson) • Roma Choudhry • Chintamoni Kar • K. C. Panigrahi • A. K. Pramanick • Utpal Dutta • Kanan Devi • Kartic Chatterjee • Durgadas Mitra • Arti Tagore
- Jury Regional: Madras
  - C. R. Pattabhiraman (Chairperson) • P. Achutha Menon • R. K. Narayan • Mallikarjuna Rao • Sarojini Varadappan • K. Manoharan • Rajammal Anantharaman • V. C. Subburaman • D. V. S. Raju • B. Ananthaswami

== Awards ==
Awards were divided into feature films and non-feature films.

The President's Gold Medal for the All India Best Feature Film is now better known as the National Film Award for Best Feature Film, whereas the President's Gold Medal for the Best Documentary Film is analogous to today's National Film Award for Best Non-Feature Film. For children's films, the Prime Minister's Gold Medal is now given as the National Film Award for Best Children's Film. At the regional level, the President's Silver Medal for Best Feature Film is now given as the National Film Award for Best Feature Film in a particular language. Certificates of Merit in all categories have been discontinued over the years.

=== Lifetime Achievement Award ===
Award	Image	Awardee(s)	Awarded As	Cash prize
Dadasaheb Phalke Award		Devika Rani Chaudhuri Roerich	Actress	₹11,000, a shawl and a plaque

=== Feature films ===
Feature films were awarded at the All India as well as the regional level. For the 17th National Film Awards, a Bengali film Bhuvan Shome won the President's Gold Medal for the All India Best Feature Film while also winning the maximum number of awards (three).

==== All India awards ====
The awards given at the All India level were as follows:

Award	Film	Language	Awardee(s)	Cash prize
Best Feature Film	Bhuvan Shome	Hindi	Producer: Mrinal Sen	Gold Medal and ₹20,000
Best Feature Film	Bhuvan Shome	Hindi	Director: Mrinal Sen	Gold Medal and ₹20,000
Second Best Feature Film	Dibratrir Kabya	Bengali	Producer: M/s. Nabik Productions	₹5,000 and a medal
Second Best Feature Film	Dibratrir Kabya	Bengali	Director: Bimal Bhowmick	₹2,000 and a plaque
Second Best Feature Film	Dibratrir Kabya	Bengali	Director: Narayan Chakraborty	₹2,000 and a plaque
Best Feature Film on National Integration	Saat Hindustani	Hindi	Producer: Khwaja Ahmad Abbas	₹5,000 and a medal
Best Feature Film on National Integration	Saat Hindustani	Hindi	Director: Khwaja Ahmad Abbas	₹5,000 and a medal
Best Actor (Bharat Award)	Bhuvan Shome	Hindi	Utpal Dutt	A figurine
Best Actress (Urvashi Award)	Dibratrir Kabya	Bengali	Madhabi Mukherjee	A figurine
Best Direction	Bhuvan Shome	Hindi	Mrinal Sen	₹ 5,000 and a plaque
Best Music Direction	Nanak Nam Jahaz Hai	Punjabi	S. Mohinder	₹ 5,000 and a plaque
Best Male Playback Singer	Aradhana (For the song "Safal Hogi Teri Aradhana")	Hindi	Sachin Dev Burman	A plaque
Best Female Playback Singer	Thunaivan	Tamil	K. B. Sundarambal	A plaque
Lyric Writer of the Best Film Song on National Integration	Saat Hindustani (For the song "Aandhi Aaye Ki Toofan")	Hindi	Kaifi Azmi	A plaque
Best Screenplay	Gejje Pooje	Kannada	S. R. Puttanna Kanagal	₹5,000 and a plaque
Best Cinematography (Black and White)	Sara Akash	Hindi	K. K. Mahajan	₹5,000 and a plaque
Best Cinematography (Color)	Shanti Nilayam	Tamil	Marcus Bartley	₹5,000 and a plaque

==== Regional awards ====
Some awards were given to the best films made in the various regional languages of India. For feature films in English, the President's Silver Medal for Best Feature Film was not given. The producer and director of the winning films were awarded with ₹5,000 and a Silver medal, respectively.

Award	Film	Awardee(s)	
Award	Film	Producer	Director
Best Feature Film in Assamese	Dr. Bezbarooah	M/s Rangghar Cine Productions	Brajen Baruah
Best Feature Film in Bengali	Natun Pata	M/s Gora Pictures	Dinen Gupta
Best Feature Film in Gujarati	Kanku	Kantilal Rathod	Kantilal Rathod
Best Feature Film in Hindi	Satyakam	Sher Jeng Singh Punchee	Hrishikesh Mukherjee
Best Feature Film in Kannada	Gejje Pooje	Chithra Jyothi	S. R. Puttanna Kanagal
Best Feature Film in Malayalam	Adimakal	M. O. Joseph	K. S. Sethumadhavan
Best Feature Film in Marathi	Tambdi Mati	Lilabai Bhalji Pendharkar	Bhalji Pendharkar
Best Feature Film in Oriya	Adina Megha	Babulal Doshi	Amit Maitra
Best Feature Film in Punjabi	Nanak Nam Jahaz Hai	Pannalal Maheshwary	Ram Maheshwary
Best Feature Film in Tamil	Iru Kodugal	N. Selvaraj	K. Balachander
Best Feature Film in Tamil	Iru Kodugal	B. Doraisamy	K. Balachander
Best Feature Film in Tamil	Iru Kodugal	N. Krishan	K. Balachander
Best Feature Film in Tamil	Iru Kodugal	V. Govindarajan	K. Balachander
Best Feature Film in Telugu	Aadarsa Kutumbam	N. Trivikrama Rao	Adurthi Subba Rao

=== Non-Feature films ===
Awards were also given to numerous short films.

Award	Film	Language	Awardee(s)	Cash prize
Best Information Film (Documentary)	Amrita Sher-Gil	English	Producer: B. D. Garga	₹5,000 and a medal
Best Information Film (Documentary)	Amrita Sher-Gil	English	Director: B. D. Garga	₹5,000 and a medal
Best Educational / Instructional Film	Life	English	Producer: K. L. Khandpur for Films Division	₹5,000 and a medal
Best Educational / Instructional Film	Life	English	Director: S. Gangooii	₹2,000 and a plaque
Best Animation Film	Umbrella	English	Producer: G. K. Gokhale for Films Division	₹5,000 and a medal
Best Animation Film	Umbrella	English	Director: B. R. Shendge	₹2,000 and a plaque
Best Promotional Film (Commercial)	Weave Me Some Flowers	English	Producer: Mohan Wadhwani for Films Division	A medal only
Best Promotional Film (Commercial)	Weave Me Some Flowers	English	Director: P. B. Pendharkar	A plaque only

=== Awards not given ===
Some awards were not given because no film was considered suitable:

- Best Story Writer
- Best Film on Family Welfare
- Best Children's Film
- Best Child Artist
- Best Film on Social Documentation
- Best Experimental Film
- Best Promotional Film (Non-Commercial)
- President's Silver Medal for Best Feature Film in English
