= Mrigayaa =

1976 Indian film directed by Mrinal Sen

- Directed by: Mrinal Sen
- Written by: Mohit Chattopadhyay; Arun Kaul
- Based on: Shikar by Bhagabati Charan Panigrahi
- Produced by: K. Rajeshwara Rao
- Starring: Mithun Chakraborty; Mamata Shankar; Robert Wright; Sadhu Meher; Asit Bandopadhyay
- Cinematography: K. K. Mahajan
- Edited by: Gangadhar Naskar; Raju Naik; Dinkar Shetye
- Music by: Salil Chowdhury
- Release date: 6 June 1976
- Country: India
- Language: Hindi

Mrigayaa (lit. 'The royal hunt') is a 1976 Indian Hindi-language epic period drama film directed by Mrinal Sen and produced by K. Rajeshwara Rao. Based on Shikaar, an Odia short story by Bhagbati Charan Panigrahi, it stars Mithun Chakraborty and Mamata Shankar, both making their cinematic debuts through the film.

The film score was provided by Salil Chowdhury, while K. K. Mahajan handled the cinematography. At the 24th National Film Awards, Mrigayaa won two awards—Best Feature Film and Best Actor for Mithun Chakraborty. It also won the Filmfare Critics Award for Best Movie apart from being nominated for the Golden Prize at the 10th Moscow International Film Festival in 1977.

== Plot ==
In the 1930s, a group of tribals live in a small village in Odisha amidst wild animals, such as tigers and boars. Apart from the problems faced by the tribals from the animals that ruin their crops, they also suffer at the hands of greedy moneylenders and police informers. Around this time, a newly posted British administrator arrives at the village who happens to have a passion for hunting. He befriends Ghinua, a native tribal who is also an exceptional archer. The two make a deal in which Ghinua will be rewarded if he brings down a "big game".

Later, Sholpu, a young revolutionary, surreptitiously comes into the village to meet his mother. Knowing this, the police informer chases him down until he reaches his house but returns after seeing the entire village turn against him. However, he waits for his turn to punish Sholpu. Suddenly, there is a robbery in the village and one policeman is killed. The blame falls on Sholpu and the administrator declares a reward for his head. The informer takes the opportunity and kills Sholpu, thereby claiming the reward. Sholpu's death creates tension between the tribals and non-tribals. During this time, Dungri, Ghinua's wife, is abducted by a moneylender. Ghinua kills the moneylender to bring his wife back. Thinking that the time has come for the "big game", he goes happily to meet the Sahab, the administrator. The Sahab, however, hangs him for committing a murder. Until his death, Ghinua fails to understand why for the same action one is rewarded while the other is punished.

== Cast ==
- Mithun Chakraborty as Ghinua
- Mamata Shankar as Dungri
- Robert Wright as the British administrator
- Asit Bandopadhyay
- Shekhar Chatterji
- Sadhu Meher Dora
- Gyanesh Mukherjee
- Anoop Kumar
- Sajal Roy Chowdhury as moneylender
- Samit Bhanja as Sholpu
- Tom Alter

== Themes and influences ==
The film was based on Shikar, a short story by Odia writer Bhagbati Charan Panigrahi. Set in the 1930s, during the apogee of the Indian independence movement, the tale describes the lives of a tribal community who lead a tough life in a small Odisha village. While the original story was set in the 1930s, the script is set in the backdrop of a rebellion on the lines of the Santhal revolt that took place in the 1850s; Sen claimed that the story "could have happened anytime, anywhere". The theme of the villagers' facing a tough time in the form of wild animals on one hand, and cruel moneylenders on the other, are connected in the opening sequence where a boar is seen destroying the crops, following which a moneylender arrives.

== Production ==
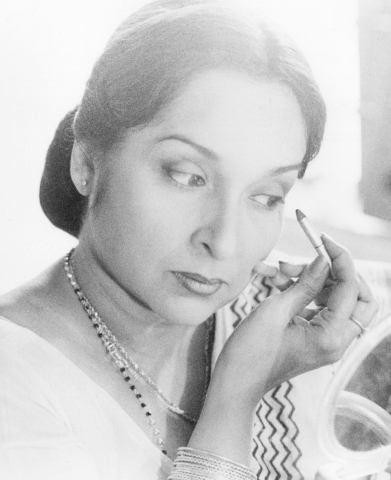
Mamata Shankar (pictured) made her acting debut through the film.

Sen, who was making political films until then, decided to experiment on films that focus on personal relationships. He decided to film a village-based story. He incurred heavy debts from his previous film, Chorus (1974). He was not able to repay the loan owing to the film's financial failure. Mrigayaa was produced by K. Rajeshwara Rao. It was Sen's first colour film, and for the role of Ghinua, he wanted to cast a henman. Unable to find one, he eventually met Mithun Chakraborty in one of his teaching sessions at the Film and Television Institute of India where the latter was a student. For the female lead, another newcomer, danseuse Mamata Shankar, Uday Shankar's daughter, was cast as Dungri. The post-production work was done at Madras.

== Music ==
1. "Gaye Garua Se Bharti Hai" - Mohammed Rafi, Pankaj Mitra
2. "Suhag Reek Atauri Chetna Ko" - Mohammed Rafi, Pankaj Mitra

== Reception ==
Mrigyaa was an average grosser at the box office. It received mixed responses from the critics and audience, who did not like the idea of mixing "story with history". While Mithun Chakraborty's portrayal as a tribesman fetched him unanimous acclaim, Shankar's performance was noted as being tense. The performances of rest of the cast, including Sadhu Meher, Samit Bhanja, and Sajal Roy Chowdhury were well received.

== Awards ==
Award	Ceremony	Category	Nominee(s)	Outcome
National Film Awards	24th National Film Awards (1976)	Best Feature Film	K. Rajeshwara Rao (Producer); Mrinal Sen (Director)	Won
National Film Awards	24th National Film Awards (1976)	Best Actor	Mithun Chakraborty	Won
Filmfare Awards	24th Filmfare Awards (1976)	Critics Award for Best Movie	K. Rajeshwara Rao	Won
Moscow International Film Festival	10th Moscow International Film Festival (1977)	Golden St. George	Mrinal Sen	Nominated
