= Sreela Majumdar =

Indian actress (1958/1959 – 2024)

- Born: 1958/1959; Calcutta, West Bengal, India
- Died: 27 January 2024 (aged 65); Kolkata, West Bengal, India
- Education: Bangabasi College
- Occupation: Actress
- Spouse: S.N.M. Abdi
- Children: 1

Sreela Majumdar (also credited as Srila Mazumdar, 1958/1959 – 27 January 2024) was an Indian actress in the Bengali language film industry. She did voice dubbing for Aishwarya Rai in the film Chokher Bali (2003).

== Early life ==
Majumdar was born to Ramchandra Majumdar and Nani Majumdar. She earned her bachelor's degree from the Bangabasi College, an affiliated college of the University of Calcutta. In 1980, she debuted in the film Parasuram directed by Mrinal Sen, but her first released film was Ek Din Pratidin. She worked with Shyam Benegal and Tarun Majumdar.

== Death ==
Majumdar died of cancer on 27 January 2024, at the age of 65. She had been suffering from cancer for 3.6 years.

== Filmography ==
=== Films ===
- Parasuram as Alhadi
- Ek Din Pratidin as Minu
- Akaler Sandhane a.k.a. In Search Of Famine (1980)
- Kharij as Sreeja
- Chokh as Jadunath's Widow
- Arohan as Panchi
- Mandi as Phoolmani
- Nagmoti (1983)
- Khandhar as Gauri
- Damul a.k.a. Bonded Until Death (1985)
- Chopper (1986)
- Ek Pal a.k.a. A Moment (1986)
- Etwa (1988)
- Aakrant (1988)
- Chandaneer (1989)
- Mon Mayuree (1990)
- Neelimay Neel (1991)
- Ek Pashia Brishti (1991)
- Prasab(1994)
- Phiriye Dao (1994)
- Puja (1996)
- Asol Nakol (1998)
- Pratibad (2001) as Meenu, Rana's elder sister
- Rangamati (2008)
- Abhisandhi (2011)
- Amar Prithibi (2015)
- Bhalobasar Bari (2018)
- Shankar Mudi (2019) as Wife of Shankar Mudi
- The Parcel (2020)
- Sleelatahanir Pore (2021) as Mandira
- Palan (2023)

=== TV series ===
Year	Title	Role	Ref.
	Sonar Sansar		
	Kashmakash		
	Samparka		
	Yatra		
