= G. V. Narayana Rao =

Indian actor and film producer (1953–2026)

- Born: 9 October 1953
- Died: 26 August 2026 (aged 72)
- Education: Diploma in Theater Arts
- Occupations: Actor, film producer
- Years active: 1976–2026
- Spouse: Anuradha Gullapalli
- Children: 2
- Parent: Father G.D. Prasada Rao (Navayuga Film Established in 1947)
- Awards: Nandi Awards

G. V. Narayana Rao (9 October 1953 – 26 August 2026) was an Indian Telugu actor, television producer, and film producer whose career spanned nearly five decades. He made his acting debut in K. Balachander's Anthuleni Katha (1976), for which he won the Nandi Award for Best Supporting Actor, and later played the lead in Mrinal Sen's Oka Oori Katha (1977), for which he received a Special Jury Award at the Karlovy Vary International Film Festival. He acted in more than 100 films and around 50 television serials, produced several films and serials — including Telugu's first daily television serial, Triveni Sangamam — and worked closely with Megastar Chiranjeevi both as a co-star and as a producer.

== Early life and training ==
Rao was born in [Guntakal / Kurumaddali village — sources conflict, see note below], Andhra Pradesh, the son of Gullapalli Durga Prasada Rao, a film distributor who founded Navayuga Films (established 1947) and ran its Ceded (Rayalaseema) region branch in Guntakal, and who was also Managing Director of Sarathi Studios. He spent his early life in Guntakal, and trained in Bharatanatyam under Gidugu Visalakshi, Kuchipudi under Nataraja Ramakrishna, and theatre under Adusumilli Radhakrishna ("A.R. Krishna") at the Andhra Pradesh Natya Sangham. His stage credits included Mohammad Bin Tughlaq, Prataparudriyam, Manchu Tera, Kundurthi Anjaneyulu's poetry-drama Aasha, and Unnava Lakshminarayana's stage adaptation of Malapalli, alongside theatre colleagues Kota Srinivasa Rao, Nuthan Prasad, Devadas Kanakala, Desiraju Hanumantha Rao, and Rallapalli. He completed a Diploma in Theatre Arts at Natya Vidyalaya, Hyderabad, in 1973, then joined the first batch of the Madras Film Institute (South India Film Chamber of Commerce), completing a Diploma in Film Acting in 1975; he formed close friendships there with batchmates Rajinikanth, Chiranjeevi, and Rajendra Prasad. He later said his preference for socially engaged roles came from a left-leaning outlook present in his family.

== Film career ==
Rao made his debut in Anthuleni Katha (1976), released on 27 February 1976 and directed by K. Balachander, winning the Nandi Award for Best Supporting Actor. He went on to play the lead in Mrinal Sen's Oka Oori Katha (1977) — the only Telugu film directed by Sen — reportedly after first recommending Kamal Haasan, whom he had met on the set of Anthuleni Katha, for the role; Sen instead urged Rao to try the part himself and lose weight for it, which Rao did at a nature-cure ashram in Bangalore. Oka Oori Katha and Chilakamma Cheppindi were screened at the First Indian Panorama in 1978 in Chennai, and Rao attended the Karlovy Vary International Film Festival as India's delegate for Oka Oori Katha, winning a Special Jury Award.

Rao's work in this period has been described as filling a gap on the Telugu screen comparable to actors such as Naseeruddin Shah and Om Puri in Hindi cinema, alongside contemporary Satyendra Kumar; his films of the era included Angadi Bomma, Nijam, Subbaraoki Kopam Vachindi, and Yuvatharam Kadilindi. He was known for accepting roles only when he liked the part rather than for financial or image-building reasons, and for prioritising films addressing social issues over regular commercial work — an approach he attributed to a left-leaning outlook present in his family.

Rao was originally intended for the lead role in Gautam Ghosh's Maa Bhoomi, but handed the part to Sai Chand after being unable to return from Karlovy Vary in time and needing to complete Angadi Bomma, a remake of the Malayalam film Her Nights directed by V. Madhusudhana Rao; he later played a journalist guiding the Maa Bhoomi character Narasing Rao in Rangula Kala. He appeared in more than 100 films altogether, including Muthyala Pallaki, Manchu Pallaki, Oorukichchina Maata, Chattaniki Kallu Levu, Gang Leader, Hitler, Chakram (2005), and Sahasam (2013).

== Television career ==
Rao appeared in around 50 television serials on Doordarshan, ETV, and Gemini TV, including Pasupu Kumkuma and Sundarakanda, and hosted a cooking show, Babai Hotel, on ETV. His performance in the Doordarshan serial Mallitellavarindhi won him the Nandi Award for Best Actor in 1988, and he won a Yuva Kalavahini award for ETV's Agni Sakshi in 2002. He wrote the story and screenplay for, and produced, Triveni Sangamam — described as Telugu's first daily television serial — for which he received the Yuva Kalavahini, Vartha Vamsi, and Bulliterá awards, and Best Actor honours at the Vamsi Berkeley Awards; he also produced the serials Mahalakshmi and Abhishekam.

== Production credits ==
He produced Devanthakudu (1984) and Yamudiki Mogudu (1988), both starring Chiranjeevi and directed by S.A. Chandrasekhar; Devanthakudu was also the first film to pair Chiranjeevi and Vijayashanthi. Yamudiki Mogudu was remade in Tamil as Athisaya Piravi (1990), starring Rajinikanth. He also produced Intikoka Rudramma and Pelli Neeku Subham Naaku, and co-produced the telefilm Andhra Vaibhavam with Dr. D. Ramanaidu, which was screened at TANA (USA) and won several Nandi Awards from the Andhra Pradesh government. His final production was the film Alochana, directed by Surender Chaacha, co-starring Narsimha Raju, Prasadbabu, and Rajan Hari, which was arranged to release after his death.

== Death ==
Rao died in Hyderabad on 26 August 2026, at the age of 72, reportedly after Heart Attack.

== Personal life ==
Rao said in an interview that he married his cousin (his sister's daughter), and had two children and two grandchildren. His son, Avinash, is a businessman. His daughter, Lalitha Yamini, is a pharmacist based in London. Rao was a devoted admirer of Akkineni Nageswara Rao and chose not to adopt a stage name in tribute to him. He remained active in Telugu theatre throughout his career, notably performing the role of Karataka Sastri in a staging of Kanyasulkam opposite Jhansi as Madhuravani.

== Awards ==
- Nandi Award for Best Supporting Actor — Anthuleni Katha (1976)
- Special Jury Award, Karlovy Vary International Film Festival — Oka Oori Katha (1978)
- Award for Best Actor (Doordarshan) — Mallitellavarindhi (1988)
- Yuva Kalavahini Award, Best Supporting Actor — Agni Sakshi (ETV, 2002)
- Yuva Kalavahini, Vartha Vamsi, and Bulliterá awards, and Vamsi Berkeley Award for Best Actor — Triveni Sangamam

== Legacy ==
Contemporaries have credited Rao's presence in the industry with giving other filmmakers the confidence to take creative risks: director Dhavala Satyam, who entered the industry from Praja Natya Mandali, is said to have written Subbaraoki Kopam Vachindi partly because of him, and writer Yandamoori Veerendranath credits him with the courage to adapt his stage hit Kukka into a film.

== Filmography ==
1. Anthuleni Katha (1976)
2. Muthyala Pallaki (1976)
3. Oka Oori Katha (1977)
4. Chilakamma Cheppindi (1977)
5. Aalu Magalu (1977)
6. Ninaithale Inikkum (1979) – Guest appearance
7. Guppedu Manasu (1979)
8. Kukka kaatuku cheppu debba (1979)
9. Badai Basavayya (1980) as Ramarao
10. Nijam (1980)
11. Oorukichchina Maata (1981) as Gireesam
12. Chattaniki Kallu Levu (1981) as Ranga
13. Manchu Pallaki (1982)
14. Pralaya Rudrudu (1982) as Murali
15. Bahudoorapu Batasari (1983)
16. Devanthakudu (1984)
17. Premayanam (1988)
18. Nyayam Kosam (1988) as Madhu
19. Yamudiki Mogudu (1988)
20. Muthyamantha Muddu (1989)
21. Raja Vikramarka (1990)
22. Seetharamaiah Gari Manavaralu (1991)
23. Gang Leader (1991)
24. Surya IPS (1991)
25. Super Express (1991) as Person with speech impediment
26. Prema Chitram Pelli Vichitram (1993)
27. Hitler (1997)
28. Sahasam (2013)
29. Maha bhakta Siriyala (2014)
30. Raju gari gadi 2 (2017)
31. Tholu Bommalata (2019)
32. Skylab (2021)
33. Angadi Bomma [year needed] — remake of the Malayalam film Her Nights, directed by V. Madhusudhana Rao
34. Subbaraoki Kopam Vachindi [year needed]
35. Yuvatharam Kadilindi [year needed]
36. Rangula Kala [year needed] — as a journalist guiding the character Narasing Rao
37. Chakram (2005)
38. Idenizam [year needed]
39. Intikoka Rudramma [year needed]
40. Pelli Neeku Subham Naaku [year needed]
41. Alochana (2026) — directed by Surender Chaacha; his final film, released posthumously

== Television series ==
- Pasupu Kumkuma (Zee Telugu)
- Sundarakanda (Gemini TV)
- Girija Kalyanam (Gemini TV)
- Geethanjali (Gemini TV)
- Mallitellavarindhi (Doordarshan) — won the Nandi Award for Best Actor, 1988
- Agni Sakshi (ETV) — won the Yuva Kalavahini award for Best Supporting Actor, 2002
- Triveni Sangamam — story, screenplay, and production; described as Telugu's first daily serial
- Mahalakshmi — produced
- Abhishekam — produced
- Babai Hotel (ETV) — cooking show, host
