= Bhagabati Charan Panigrahi =

Indian Odia writer and politician

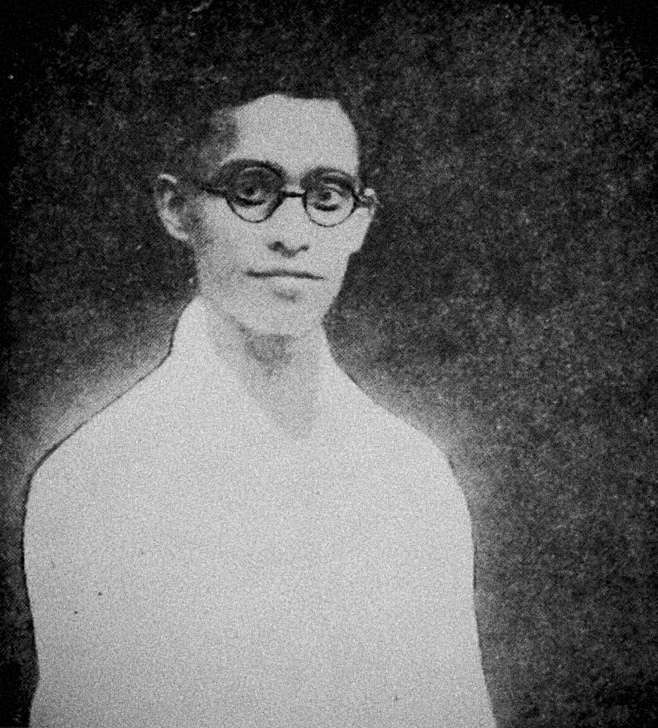
- Born: 1908; Bengal Presidency, British India
- Died: 23 October 1943 (aged 34–35)
- Occupations: Writer, politician

Bhagabati Charan Panigrahi (1 February 1908 – 23 October 1943) was an Indian Odia writer and India’s freedom struggle revolutionary/ martyr . He was a founding member of Netaji's Forward Bloc. He was the founding secretary of Communist Party of India in Orissa. He wrote around a dozen short stories before he was mysteriously murdered while under arrest of British India Police in 1943. He was a close associate of Netaji Subhas Chandra Bose.

== Literary career ==
Bhagabati Charan Panigrahi, in his short literary career, wrote around 12 short stories. One of his notable short stories was Shikaar. The story captured the life of the tribal communities of Odisha, and the exploitation by British to control and suppress their revolt. The story was made into a film Mrigayaa (1976) by Mrinal Sen. In 2016, an Odia language play was also written and staged based on the same story.

In November 1935, in collaboration with Ananta Patnaik and others, he formed a literary organisation "Nabayuga Sahitya Sansad" (transl. New Age Literary Society). Very soon it became famous and played significant role to foster new ideas in modern Odia literature. In 1936, he edited a magazine called Adhunika.

=== Short stories ===
The 12 stories written by Bhagabati Charan Panigrahi are:

- Shikar
- Mimansha
- Junglee
- Arambha
- Oh Sesha
- Mrutyura Chetana
- Jeevanarah Samadhi
- Banchita
- Samayatita
- Jhada
- Misranka Kopa
- Majlish

== Political career ==
Bhagabati Charan, in his youth and in the beginning of his political career was inspired by Mahatma Gandhi's political ideology. Later he became associated with Congress Socialist Party. Panigrahi, along with Guru Charan Patnaik, and Comrade Prananath Patnaik formed the Communist Party of Odisha on 1 April 1936. Panigrahi was the first state secretary of the party. He later became a lead member of Netaji’s Forward Block. Panigrahi was associated with the Netaji’s ideology till his death.

== Death ==
On 23 October 1943, Panigrahi was found dead under mysterious circumstances. Back then he was undergoing detention by the British India Police. The death certificate reported he died because of unknown illness, however there were speculations that he was tortured to death because he had not divulged the plan of Netaji to announce Azad Hind Sarkar from Singapore on 21 Oct 1943.

== See also ==
- Fakir Mohan Senapati, Odia writer
