= 24th National Film Awards =

Indian ceremony celebrating cinema of 1976

- Awarded for: Best of Indian cinema in 1976
- Awarded by: Directorate of Film Festivals
- Presented by: Neelam Sanjiva Reddy (President of India)
- Announced on: 15 September 1977
- Presented on: 1977
- Site: New Delhi
- Official website: dff.nic.in

Highlights
- Best Feature Film: Mrigayaa
- Dadasaheb Phalke Award: Kanan Devi
- Most awards: Pallavi (3)

The 24th National Film Awards, presented by Directorate of Film Festivals, the organisation set up by Ministry of Information and Broadcasting, India to felicitate the best of Indian Cinema released in 1976.

== Awards ==
Awards were divided into feature films and non-feature films.

=== Lifetime Achievement Award ===
| Name of Award | Image | Awardee(s) | Awarded As | Awards |
|---|---|---|---|---|
| Dadasaheb Phalke Award | | Kanan Devi | Actress | Swarna Kamal, ₹20,000 and a Shawl |

=== Feature films ===
Feature films were awarded at All India as well as regional level. For 24th National Film Awards, a Hindi film, Mrugaya won the President's Gold Medal for the All India Best Feature Film. Following were the awards given in each category:

==== All India Award ====
Following were the awards given:

| Name of Award | Name of Film | Language | Awardee(s) | Awards |
|---|---|---|---|---|
| Best Feature Film | Mrigayaa | Hindi | Producer: Uday Bhaskar International | Swarna Kamal, ₹40,000 and a Certificate |
| Best Feature Film | Mrigayaa | Hindi | Director: Mrinal Sen | Rajat Kamal, ₹15,000 and a Certificate |
| Second Best Feature Film | Pallavi | Kannada | Producer: K. S. Indira Lankesh | Rajat Kamal, ₹15,000 and a Certificate |
| Second Best Feature Film | Pallavi | Kannada | Director: P. Lankesh | Rajat Kamal, ₹10,000 and a Certificate |
| Best Feature Film with Mass Appeal, Wholesome Entertainment and Aesthetic Value | No Award | | Producer: | Swarna Kamal and a Certificate |
| Best Feature Film with Mass Appeal, Wholesome Entertainment and Aesthetic Value | No Award | | Director: | Rajat Kamal and a Certificate |
| Best Direction | Pallavi | Kannada | P. Lankesh | Rajat Kamal, ₹20,000 and a Certificate |
| Best Cinematography (Black and White) | Mohiniyattam | Malayalam | P. S. Nivas | Rajat Kamal, ₹5,000 and a Certificate |
| Best Cinematography (Color) | Rishyashringa | Kannada | S. Ramachandra | Rajat Kamal, ₹5,000 and a Certificate |
| Best Actor | Mrigayaa | Hindi | Mithun Chakraborty | Rajat Kamal, ₹10,000 and a Certificate |
| Best Actress | Sila Nerangalil Sila Manithargal | Tamil | Lakshmi | Rajat Kamal, ₹10,000 and a Certificate |
| Best Male Playback Singer | Chitchor | Hindi | K. J. Yesudas | Rajat Kamal and a Certificate |
| Best Female Playback Singer | Siri Siri Muvva | Telugu | P. Susheela | Rajat Kamal and a Certificate |
| Best Music Direction | Rishyashringa | Kannada | B. V. Karanth | Rajat Kamal, ₹10,000 and a Certificate |
| Best Editing | Siri Siri Muvva | Telugu | K. Babu Rao | Rajat Kamal and ₹5,000 |
| Best Child Artist | Chitchor | Hindi | Raju | Rajat Kamal and ₹5,000 |
| Best Screenplay | Manthan | Hindi | Vijay Tendulkar | Rajat Kamal and ₹5,000 |
| Best Audiography | Bhakta Kannappa | Telugu | S. P. Ramanathan | Rajat Kamal and ₹5,000 |

==== Regional Award ====
The awards were given to the best films made in the regional languages of India.

All the awardees are awarded with 'Silver Lotus Award (Rajat Kamal)', a certificate and cash prize.

| Name of Award | Name of Film | Awardee(s) | Awards |
|---|---|---|---|
| Best Feature Film in Assamese | Putala Ghar | Producer: Dr. Bhabendranath Saikia | ₹10,000 |
| Best Feature Film in Assamese | Putala Ghar | Director: | ₹5,000 |
| Best Feature Film in Bengali | Ek Je Chillo Desh | Producer: | ₹10,000 |
| Best Feature Film in Bengali | Ek Je Chillo Desh | Director: | ₹5,000 |
| Best Feature Film in Hindi | Manthan | Producer: Gujarat Co-operative Milk Marketing Federation Ltd. | ₹10,000 |
| Best Feature Film in Hindi | Manthan | Director: Shyam Benegal | ₹5,000 |
| Best Feature Film in Kannada | Pallavi | Producer: K. S. Indira Lankesh | ₹10,000 |
| Best Feature Film in Kannada | Pallavi | Director: P. Lankesh | ₹5,000 |
| Best Feature Film in Malayalam | Manimuzhhakam | Producer: Cartoonist Thomas | ₹10,000 |
| Best Feature Film in Malayalam | Manimuzhhakam | Director: P. A. Backer | ₹5,000 |
| Best Feature Film in Manipuri | Saaphabee | Producer: G. Narayan Sharma | ₹10,000 |
| Best Feature Film in Manipuri | Saaphabee | Director: Aribam Syam Sharma | ₹5,000 |
| Best Feature Film in Odia | Sesha Sravan | Producer: Nagen Roy | ₹10,000 |
| Best Feature Film in Odia | Sesha Sravan | Director: Prashant Nanda | ₹5,000 |
| Best Feature Film in Telugu | Oorummadi Brathukulu | Producer: | ₹10,000 |
| Best Feature Film in Telugu | Oorummadi Brathukulu | Director: B. S. Narayana | ₹5,000 |

=== Non-Feature films ===
Not Available

=== Awards not given ===
Following were the awards not given as no film was found to be suitable for the award

- Best Film on Family Welfare
- Best Children's Film
- Best Lyrics
- Best Feature Film on National Integration
- President's Silver Medal for Best Feature Film in English
- President's Silver Medal for Best Feature Film in Punjabi
- President's Silver Medal for Best Feature Film in Tamil
