= Oka Oori Katha =

- Directed by: Mrinal Sen
- Written by: Yandamoori Veerendranath (dialogues)
- Screenplay by: Mohit Chattopadhyay
- Story by: Munshi Premchand
- Produced by: A. Parandhama Reddy
- Starring: M. V. Vasudeva Rao; G. V. Narayana Rao; Pradeep Kumar; Mamata Shankar; A. R. Krishna
- Cinematography: K. K. Mahajan
- Edited by: Gangadhar Naskar
- Music by: Vijay Raghav Rao
- Distributed by: Chandrodaya Art Films
- Release date: 1977
- Country: India
- Language: Telugu

Oka Oori Katha (English title: The Marginal Ones; Telugu: ఒక ఊరి కథ) is a 1977 Indian Telugu-language drama film directed by Mrinal Sen. An adaptation of Munshi Premchand's short story Kafan (The Burial Shroud), the film transports the narrative from the Hindi heartland of Premchand to the rural landscapes of Telangana. Starring M. V. Vasudeva Rao, G. V. Narayana Rao, and Mamata Shankar, the film sharply critiques feudal exploitation by depicting the harsh lives of a father-son duo who resist the oppressive system by refusing to work.

Oka Oori Katha was one of India's entries at the 4th Hong Kong International Film Festival and was also featured at the Karlovy Vary International Film Festival, the Carthage Film Festival, and the Indian Panorama section of the 7th International Film Festival of India. The film won the Special Jury Prize at Karlovy Vary and was awarded Best Feature Film in Telugu at the 25th National Film Awards. The jury praised the film for its potent transformation of Premchand's story into a powerful commentary on rural poverty and social injustice, lauding its unflinching portrayal of the harsh realities faced by the downtrodden and its impassioned appeal to human conscience.

== Plot ==
Venkayya (Vasudeva Rao) and his son Kistayya (Narayana Rao) live in a village. Venkayya lives in an eccentric, deeply isolated world of his own. Having learned to endure extreme hunger, the two men are mentally hardened and firmly believe that poor farmers are fools to labor for the wealthy just to suffer. Kistayya marries Nilamma (Mamata Shankar) despite his father's opposition.

Nilamma tries to control the family. Venkayya does not change. Kistayya stands between them. There is bitterness in the family. In course of time, Nilamma conceives. One day, they find Nilamma in acute pain. The father refuses to call a midwife and Nilamma dies. They decide to conduct funeral rites for Nilamma. They go begging around the village and gather some money and decide to spend it on drinks.

== Cast ==
- A. R. Krishna
- Pradeep Kumar
- G. V. Narayana Rao as Kistayya
- M. V. Vasudeva Rao as Venkayya
- Mamata Shankar as Nilamma
- Chintapally Bhadra Reddy as Zamindar

== Reception ==
A critic for The Telegraph noted in 2019 that Mrinal Sen's Oka Oori Katha offers a blistering, absurdist critique of feudal exploitation, portraying the degradation of marginalized individuals through its stark and unflinching narrative, making it a unique and unsettling piece of Indian cinema.

== Awards ==
National Film Awards

- National Film Award for Best Feature Film in Telugu - Mrinal Sen and A. Parandhama Reddy

Nandi Awards

- Third Best Feature Film - Bronze - A. Parandhama Reddy

International Honors

- Karlovy Vary International Film Festival - Special Jury Award
- Carthage Film Festival - Special Award
