= Pratinidhi (film) =

1964 Indian Bengali film

- Directed by: Mrinal Sen
- Written by: Achintya Kumar Sengupta
- Produced by: Ellora Productions
- Starring: Soumitra Chatterjee, Sabitri Chatterjee, Satya Bannerjee
- Cinematography: Sailaja Chatterjee
- Edited by: Gangadhar Naskar
- Music by: Hemanta Mukherjee
- Release date: 1964
- Country: India
- Language: Bengali

Pratinidhi (The Representative) is a 1965 Bengali film directed by noted Indian art film director Mrinal Sen. The Black & White film was based on Prachhadpat (The Cover), a novel by Achintya Kumar Sengupta, a noted writer of Modern Bengali literature.

== Plot ==
A young engineer Niren marries a young widow Rama who already has a five-year-old child Tutul from her previous marriage. Their marital life grows increasingly difficult as Tutul refuses to recognise his stepfather. Niren's attempts to win him over too fail even as Rama tries to please both. The marriage finally collapses and she commits suicide.

== Cast ==
- Soumitra Chatterjee as Niren
- Sabitri Chatterjee as Rama
- Satya Bannerjee
- Jahar Roy
- Anup Kumar as Rama's brother
