= Mahaprithibi =

1991 Indian Bengali social drama film

Mahaprithibi (World Within, World Without) is a 1991 Bengali social drama film directed by Mrinal Sen. The film was released under the banner of G. G. Films and received BFJA Awards in 1992.

== Plot ==
The film revolves around the global changing social order. An elderly lady of a family committed suicide, and some reasons as to why she committed suicide are revealed. She has three sons and a daughter; her eldest son was involved in the Naxalbari uprising and was killed brutally by the police. Her widowed daughter-in-law had an affair with her other son before their marriage. Soon after the death of his elder brother, the younger one goes to Germany, becomes jobless and returns to Kolkata. The youngest son is unemployed and the only daughter is a mental patient. All these affects the lady and she commits suicide.

== Cast ==
- Soumitra Chatterjee
- Aparna Sen
- Victor Bannerjee
- Anjan Dutt
- Asit Bandopadhyay
- Anashua Majumdar
- Gita Dey
- Chandan Roy
- Abhijit Mukhopadhyay
- Kumarjit Chattopadhyay
- Mukul Chowdhury
