= National Film Award for Second Best Feature Film =

Indian film award

- National award for contributions to Indian Cinema
- Awarded for: Second Best Feature Film of the year
- Sponsored by: Directorate of Film Festivals
- Formerly called: All India Certificate of Merit for the Second Best Feature Film (1957–1967)
- Rewards: Rajat Kamal (Silver Lotus); ₹30,000 (Producer) ₹15,000 (Director)
- First award: 1957
- Final award: 1992

Highlights
- Total awarded: 27
- First winner: Andhare Alo
- Last winner: Padma Nadir Majhi

The National Film Award for Second Best Feature Film was one of the National Film Awards presented annually by the Directorate of Film Festivals, the organisation set up by Ministry of Information and Broadcasting, India. It was one of several awards presented for feature films and awarded with Rajat Kamal (Silver Lotus).

The award was instituted in 1957, at the 5th National Film Awards. It was awarded annually to a film produced in India that year, in any Indian language. It was last awarded in 1992, at the 40th National Film Awards.

== Winners ==
Award includes 'Rajat Kamal' (Silver Lotus) and cash prize. Following are the award winners over the years:

Awards legends
*	Certificate of Merit for the Second Best Feature Film

List of films, showing the year (award ceremony), language(s), producer(s) and director(s)
Year	Film(s)	Language(s)	Producer(s)	Director(s)	Refs.
1957 (5th)	Andhare Alo	Bengali	Sreemati Pictures	Haridas Bhattacharya	
1958 (6th)	Jalsaghar	Bengali	Satyajit Ray	Satyajit Ray	
1959 (7th)	Heera Moti	Hindi	Pravin Desai	Krishnan Chopra	
1960 (8th)	Kshudhita Pashan	Bengali	Hemen Ganguly	Tapan Sinha	
1961 (9th)	Pava Mannippu	Tamil	Buddha Pictures	A. Bhimsingh	
1962 (10th)	Abhijan	Bengali	Abhijatrik	Satyajit Ray	
1963 (11th)	Nartanasala	Telugu	• Sridhar Rao • C. Lakshmi Rajyam	K. Kameswara Rao	
1964 (12th)	Haqeeqat	Hindi	Chetan Anand	Chetan Anand	
1965 (13th)	Atithi	Bengali	New Theaters Pvt Ltd.	Tapan Sinha	
1966 (14th)	No Award				
1967 (15th)	Upkar	Hindi	R. N. Goswami	Manoj Kumar	
1968 (16th)	Thulabharam	Malayalam	Supriya Pictures	A. Vincent	
1969 (17th)	Dibratrir Kabya	Bengali	Nabik Productions	•Bimal Bhowmick •Narayan Chakraborty	
1970 (18th)	Pratidwandi	Bengali	• Nepal Dutta • Asim Dutta	Satyajit Ray	
1971 (19th)	Anubhav	Hindi	Basu Bhattacharya	Basu Bhattacharya	
1972 (20th)	Calcutta 71	Bengali	D. S. Sultania	Mrinal Sen	
1973 (21st)	Kaadu	Kannada	• K. N. Narayan • G. N. Lakshmipathy	Girish Karnad	
1974 (22nd)	Ankur	Hindi	Blaze Film Enterprises	Shyam Benegal	
1975 (23rd)	Mausam	Hindi	P. Mallikharjuna Rao	Gulzar	
1976 (24th)	Pallavi	Kannada	K. S. Indira Lankesh	P. Lankesh	
1977 (25th)	No Award				
1978 (26th)	No Award				
1979 (27th)	No Award				
1980 (28th)	Oppol	Malayalam	Rosamma George	K. S. Sethumadhavan	
1981 (29th)	Pokkuveyil	Malayalam	K. Ravindranathan Nair	G. Aravindan	
1982 (30th)	Kharij	Bengali	Neel Kanth Films	Mrinal Sen	
1983 (31st)	Maya Miriga	Oriya	NFDC	Nirad N. Mohapatra	
1984 (32nd)	No Award				
1985 (33rd)	No Award				
1986 (34th)	No Award				
1987 (35th)	No Award				
1988 (36th)	No Award				
1989 (37th)	Parshuramer Kuthar	Bengali	Dhurjati Prasad Mukherji	Nabyendu Chattopadhyay	
1990 (38th)	Ek Doctor Ki Maut	Hindi	NFDC	Tapan Sinha	
1991 (39th)	Firingoti	Assamese	• Sailadhar Baruah • Jahnu Barua	Jahnu Barua	
1992 (40th)	Padma Nadir Majhi	Bengali	Government of West Bengal	Gautam Ghose	
