= M. V. Vasudeva Rao =

Indian actor (c. 1919–2002)

- Born: Mudabidri Venkat Rao Vasudeva Rao c. 1919; British India
- Died: 22 March 2002 (aged 82–83); Bangalore, India
- Occupation: Actor
- Awards: National Film Award for Best Actor

Mudabidri Venkat Rao Vasudeva Rao (c. 1919 – 22 March 2002) was an Indian actor. He entered the film world as a child actor in 1928. He won the Best Actor Award at the 23rd National Film Awards for his role of Choma in the Chomana Dudi (1975), a film based on Shivarama Karanth's novel of the same name.

== Biography ==
Rao was one of six children of his school-teacher father, who struggled to make ends meet for his family. In 1928, as a nine-year-old, Rao, and two of his brothers, were sent to Gubbi Veeranna's theatre company to help financially support the family. Rao performed child roles in plays such as Shree Krishna Parijata, and often performed for the erstwhile Maharaja Krishna Raja Wadiyar IV, under whose patronage the company functioned, at the Jaganmohan Palace in Mysore. Rao worked for the company despite many others leaving for cinema, and tutored future theatre and film personalities such as B. V. Karanth.

Rao was offered the lead role Chomana Dudi (1975) by Shivaram Karanth, which he accepted. Recalling his experience on the film in an interview for Deccan Herald in 1999, he stated: "I would lock myself up in a room everyday and for hours together I would practice. Finally, I got a hang of my role." Rao played a dalit waging a futile struggle to own a piece of land. For his performance, he was awarded the National Film Award for Best Actor at the 23rd National Film Awards. Rao returned to stage acting, with infrequent film appearances, most notably Mrinal Sen's Oka Oori Katha (1977) and Shyam Benegal's Kondura (1978) among others. He would then go on appear in over 200 films, mostly in Kannada, and also in Hindi, Telugu and Tamil languages. However, post Chomana Dudi, he mostly played minor roles. He died on 22 March 2002 in Bangalore, aged 82. The Chief Minister of his home State of Karnataka, S. M. Krishna, noted: "Sri Vasudeva Rao with his vast experience in professional theatre companies used to instil life into his roles. He had immortalised the fictitious "Choma" of Shivarama Karanth through his lively performance. In his death the Kannada film industry and the field of professional drama have lost a doyen."

== Selected filmography ==
- Chomana Dudi (1975)
- Oka Oori Katha (1977) (Telugu)
- Kondura (1978) (Hindi)
- Aparichita (1978)
- Kappu Kola (1980)...Shankar Rao
- Dharma Dari Thappithu (1982)...Narasayya
- Nayakan (1987) (Tamil)
- Ondagi Balu (1989)
- Bagh Bahadur (1989) (Bengali)
- Bombay (1995) (Tamil)
- Dweepa (2002)
