= Ramapada Chowdhury =

Indian writer (1922–2018)

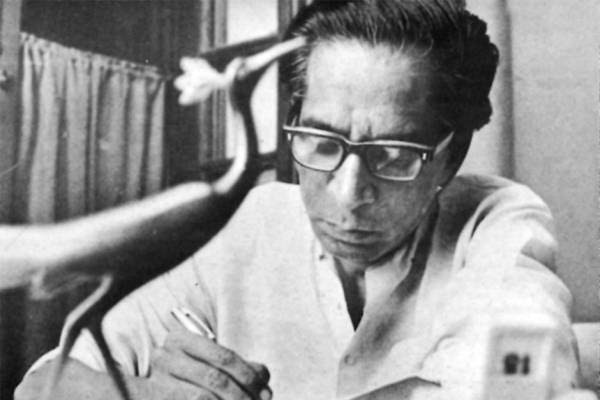
- Chowdhury in 1980
- Born: 28 December 1922; Kharagpur, Bengal Presidency, British India
- Died: 29 July 2018 (aged 95); Kolkata, India
- Education: Master of Arts; Presidency College, University of Calcutta
- Occupation: Writer
- Writing career
- Language: Bengali
- Subjects: Novel, short story
- Notable works: Banpalashir Padabali, Ekhoni, Kharij, Je Jekhane Danriye, Bari Badle Jay
- Notable awards: Ananda Puraskar; Sahitya Akademi Award; Rabindranath Tagore Memorial International Prize

Ramapada Chowdhury (Bengali pronunciation: [/ˈrɑːmɔˌpɔd̪ɔ ˈtʃɔʊd̪ʱuːɾi/] RAH-maw-paw-daw) (28 December 1922 – 29 July 2018) was a Bengali-language novelist and short story writer in India. He was the longtime editor of Rabibashoriyo, the Sunday supplement of Anandabazar Patrika. His works are often seen as "sham-naturalistic" reflections on society. In 1988, he received the Sahitya Akademi Award for his novel Bari Badle Jay.

He was also honoured with the Rabindra Puraskar and several other literary awards, including the inaugural Rabindranath Tagore Memorial International Prize. Many of his works have been adapted into films, most notably Kharij, directed by Mrinal Sen, and Ek Doctor Ki Maut, directed by Tapan Sinha—both of which earned critical acclaim.

Chowdhury began writing during World War II and remained closely associated with Anandabazar Patrika for many years. His writing style is marked by brevity and precision. He is regarded as one of the most significant short story writers in modern Bengali literature.

In a 2005 interview with Shirshendu Mukhopadhyay, he announced his retirement from writing, saying he no longer understood today's world and had nothing more to say.

== Early life ==
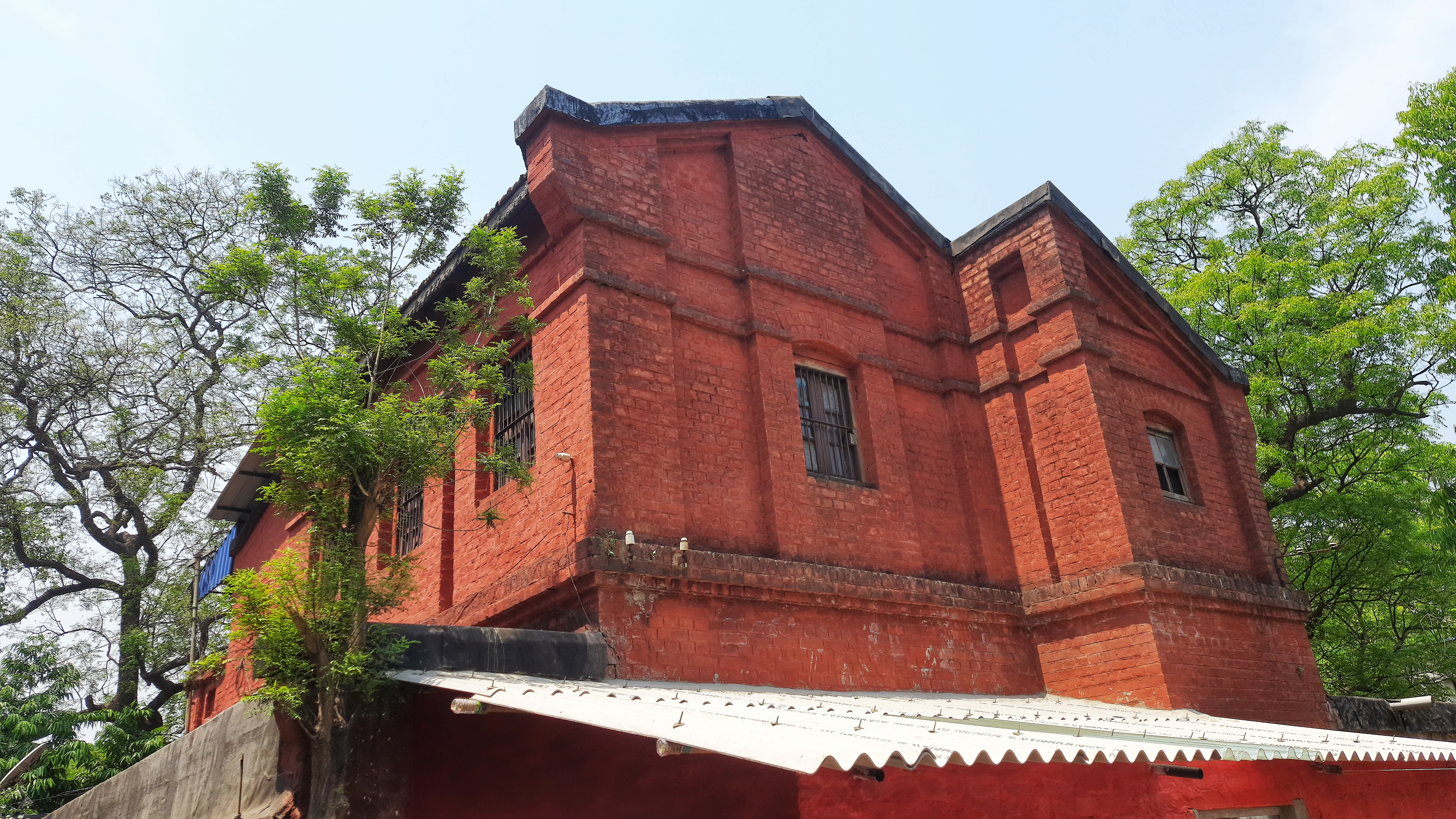
Ramapada's birthplace at Kharagpur, Paschim Medinipur

Ramapada Chowdhury was born on 28 December 1922 in Kharagpur, Bengal Presidency, British India (now in the Indian state of West Bengal). His father, Maheshchandra Chowdhury, worked in the railways, and the family often moved from one place to another. Thus young Ramapada was exposed to life in several different parts of India. Ranchi, Raipur, Bilaspur, Guwahati and Dibrugarh were some of the towns he lived in. All of these places figure in his early works of fiction. His Mother was Durgasundari Devi. He completed his schooling from Kharagpur. Subsequently, he studied at Presidency College, Calcutta, and obtained his master's degree in English literature from the University of Calcutta.

== Career ==
Chowdhury wrote his first short story as a student, in response to a challenge from his friends. It was written sitting in a restaurant near his college, and was published in the newspaper Jugantar. After completing his Master's, he got a job with Anandabazar Patrika. Later he became Associate Editor of the newspaper, and edited its Sunday supplement Rabibasariya for many years.

Chowdhury started writing short stories on a regular basis from the age of twenty-five. He published two collections of stories before the publication of his first novel Pratham Prahar (1954). Although an established writer in the 1950s, Chowdhury received wider recognition with his 1960 novel Banpalashir Padabali, which appeared in serial form in the well-known literary magazine Desh. He was awarded the Rabindra Puraskar in 1971 for his novel Ekhoni and the Sahitya Akademi Award in 1988 for Bari Badle Jay. In all, he wrote around fifty novels and over one hundred short stories. He also edited an anthology of stories originally published in Desh. According to Shamik Ghosh, Chowdhury was among the few Bengali authors who preferred quality to quantity.

In 2011, the Indian Institute of Planning and Management instituted the Rabindranath Tagore Memorial International Prize. Ramapada Chowdhury won the award in its inaugural year, for his novel Banpalashir Padabali. According to writer and scholar Surajit Dasgupta,

"Banpalashir Padabali is a stunningly vibrant and intensely human work that serves to reaffirm his reputation as a master story-teller in the Bengali language."

The Sahitya Akademi, in its series of films on eminent Indian writers, has produced a film on Ramapada Chowdhury, directed by Raja Mitra.

== Legacy ==
Writing for Desh, Bani Basu described him as "sharp and witty," noting his experimentation with different storytelling forms while preserving traditional styles and exploring the "criticism of life" in his writings. Krishna Basu saw him as a "distant personality" and counted him among his favorite novelists, alongside the three Bandopadhyays: Tarasankar, Manik, and Bibhutibhushan. Dibyendu Palit remembered him as an editor who encouraged young writers, unafraid to both praise and critique their work, while Nirendranath Chakraborty reflected on their long friendship, before and after joining ABP, and how he quit smoking after Ramapada did. Chakraborty later died the same year on 25 December. Nrisingha Prasad Bhaduri remembered him as an editor with a keen ability to draw out quality writing, praising his craftsmanship in novels, short stories, and even the brief, starkly radical notes he occasionally sent to fellow writers—each word, he said, was "irreplaceable."

== Selected works ==
- Pratham Prahar (1954)
- Dwiper Nam Tia rang (1958)
- Banpalashir Padabali (1960)
- Parajit Samrat (1966)
- Ekhoni (1969)
- Picnic (1970)
- Je Jekhane Danriye (1972)
- Album-e Koyekti Chobi (1973)
- Kharij (1974)
- Lajja (1975)
- Hridoy (1976)
- Beej (1977)
- Swajan (1981)
- Bari Badle Jay (1988)
- Abhimanyu (1982)
- Darbari
- Lalbai
- Harano Khata
- Bahiri
- Chhad
- Shesher Seemana
- Aakash Pradeep
- Bhobishyot

== English translations ==
- Nothing but the Truth (original title Kharij), translated by Enakshi Chatterjee, Vikas, New Delhi, 1978. ISBN 0706906632.
- Second Encounter (original title Je Jekhane Danriye), translated by Swapna Dutta, Niyogi Books, 2016. ISBN 9789385285448.
- Dwellings Change (original title Badi Bodle Jay), translated by Tania Chakravertty, Sahitya Akademi, 2023. ISBN 978-93-5548-630-1.

== In popular culture ==
=== Film adaptations ===
- Dwiper Nam Tiarang (1963), directed by Gurudas Bagchi
- Ekhoni (1970), directed by Tapan Sinha
- Picnic (1972), directed by Inder Sen
- Banpalashir Padabali (1973), directed by Uttam Kumar
- Je Jekhane Danriye (1974), directed by Agragami
- Kharij (1982), directed by Mrinal Sen
- Ek Din Achanak (1989) (in Hindi), directed by Mrinal Sen (based on Beej))
- The 1990 Hindi-language film Ek Doctor Ki Maut, directed by Tapan Sinha, is based on Ramapada Chowdhury’s novel Abhimanyu, loosely inspired by Dr. Subhash Mukhopadhyay, an IVF pioneer who died by suicide after alleged humiliation by colleagues and the West Bengal government.
- Sundari (1999), directed by Gul Bahar Singh (based on the short story Ahlaadi)
- Borunbabur Bondhu (2020), directed by Anik Dutta (based on Chhad)

== Awards and honours ==
- Sahitya Akademi Award 1988
- Rabindra Puraskar 1971
- Ananda Puraskar 1963
- Rabindranath Tagore Memorial International Prize 2011
