= Gangadhar Naskar =

Indian film editor

- Occupation: film editor
- Years active: 1948 to 1996

Gangadhar Naskar was an Indian film editor who was active from 1948 to 1996, primarily in Bengali cinema.

He received the National Award for Best Film Editor for three consecutive years (1978, 1979, and 1980).

Filmmaker Mrinal Sen’s collaboration with Naskar, as well as with cinematographer K.K. Mahajan, is well-known.

Naskar edited all of Sen’s films for over two decades, from 1961 to 1982.

The films that emerged from this collaboration are Punascha (1961), Abasheshe (1963), Pratinidhi (1964), Akash Kusum (1965), Matira Manisha (1966), Bhuvan Shome (1969), Interview (1971), Calcutta (1971), Padatik (1973), Chorus (1975), Oka Oori Katha (1978), Parashuram (1979), Ek Din Pratidin (1979), Dour (1979), Akaler Shandhaney (1981), Chaalchitra (1981), and Kharij (1982).

== Early life and career ==
Naskar joined the editing department of New Theatres Studios, Calcutta, in 1948 and worked with notable editors, including Hrishikesh Mukherjee and Subodh Roy. He started as an assistant editor to Roy in Sen’s Baishey Sravana (1960).

While Naskar worked mostly with Sen, occasionally he has also worked with renowned directors like Buddhadeb Dasgupta and Sandip Ray.

== Filmography ==
- Baishey Sravana (1960)
- Punascha (1961)
- Abasheshe (1963)
- Pratinidhi (1964)
- Akash Kusum (1965)
- Matira Manisha (1966)
- Bhuvan Shome (1969)
- Interview (1971)
- Calcutta (1971)
- Padatik/The Guerilla Fighter (1973)
- Chorus (1975)
- Oka Oori Katha (1978)
- Paral Ko Aago (1978)
- Parashuram (1979)
- Ek Din Pratidin/And Quiet Rolls the Dawn (1979)
- Dour (1979)
- Neem Annapurna (1980)
- Akaler Shandhaney/In Search of Famine (1981)
- Chaalchitra/The Kaleidoscope (1981)
- Kharij/The Case Is Closed (1982)
- Bandini Kamala (1982)
- Kagajer Nouka (1991)
- Mahabharati (1994)
- Himghar (1996)

== Critical response ==
The citation for the 1980 National Award for Best Film Editor reads:

The award for best editing of 1980 is given to Gangadhar Naskar for his work in the Bengali film Akaler Shandhaney, recognized for a sensitive use of images, gradually building up the tempo of the film in a well-knit pattern, never permitting a slackening of pace, and underlining the entire film with a subdued sense of drama.
