= Ek Din Pratidin =

- Ek Din Pratidin DVD cover
- Directed by: Mrinal Sen
- Written by: Mrinal Sen (writer); Amalendu Chakraborty (novel)
- Starring: Mamata Shankar; Gita Sen; Sreela Majumdar; Satya Bandhyopadhyay
- Cinematography: K. K. Mahajan
- Edited by: Gangadhar Naskar
- Music by: B.V. Karanth
- Production company: Mrinal Sen Productions
- Release date: 1979
- Running time: 95 minutes
- Country: India
- Language: Bengali

Ek Din Pratidin (Bengali: এক দিন প্রতিদিন, lit: "A Day Like Any Other," English title: "And Quiet Rolls the Dawn") is a 1979 Bengali drama film directed by Mrinal Sen, who also wrote the screenplay based on an Amalendu Chakraborty novel. Set in contemporary India, the film follows the trauma experienced by a family when the breadwinning daughter fails to return from work. The film spans the period of one evening and night.

The film won the National Film Award for Best Feature Film in Bengali and the National Film Award for Best Direction. It was entered into the 1980 Cannes Film Festival.

== Plot ==
A middle-class family of seven members, with a father (Satya Bandhyopadhyay), mother (Gita Sen), three sisters and two brothers, are economically dependent on the earnings of the sole breadwinner of the family, the oldest daughter, Chinu (Mamata Shankar).

One evening, Chinu fails to return at the regular hour from her work office. At first members of the family assume that she is working overtime and will arrive later. Later, one of her sisters (Sreela Majumdar) goes out to make a phone call to see if she can contact the office, but there is no response. The family begins to worry. And the landlord and several tenants begin to become interested in the case. Some tenants are sympathetic to the family, others, including the landlord, are more critical. The oldest son goes to the police station to lodge a complaint and then to the morgue to see if the recently deceased bodies include his sister, he is sickened by the experience. The family also make a trip to the hospital to see if a recently injured lady is their Chinu and are relieved that she is not. Soon after, Chinu returns home but is surprised by the coldness of the family's response and then an altercation breaks out between the family and the landlord.

== Cast ==
- Gita Sen as the mother
- Satya Bandhyopadhyay as the father
- Mamata Shankar as Chinu the oldest daughter
- Sreela Majumdar as Minu, the second oldest daughter
- Kaushik Sen
- Nalini Banerjee
- Arun Mukherjee
- Umanath Bhattacharya
- Biplab Chatterjee

== Themes ==
Film historian Shoma A Chatterji, writes, regarding the relationship between the family and Chinu, that underneath the events of the film lie the "unresolved attitude towards a working daughter who cannot be treated in the same manner as a working son". In the film's long night that value is laid bare and examined by the filmmakers. For Chinu, she writes, economic possibilities lead not to freedom but to a burden that she cannot escape from. Chinu's earnings are "usurped to fulfil the needs of the family, for the good-for-nothing older brother's pocket money and for the younger sister's education".

== Awards ==
- National Film Award for Best Feature Film in Bengali
- National Film Award for Best Direction
- National Film Award for Best Editing-Gangadhar Naskar
