= Sweet Memories =

Sweet Memories may refer to:

- Sweet Memories (film), a 1911 silent short romantic drama film
- Sweet Memories (Willie Nelson album), a 1979 album by Willie Nelson
- Sweet Memories (Vince Gill and Paul Franklin album), a 2023 collaborative album by Vince Gill and Paul Franklin
- Sweet Memories, a 1985 album by Mickey Newbury
- Sweet Memories (song), a 1968 single by Andy Williams, written by Mickey Newbury and covered by Willie Nelson
- "Sweet Memories", a 2002 single by Jade Anderson

== See also ==
- "Sweet Memory", a 1983 song by the Belle Stars
- Ninaithale Inikkum (disambiguation) (lit. 'Sweet Memories' in Tamil), various Indian films and TV series so titled
