= Ek Adhuri Kahani =

1972 Hindi language film

- Directed by: Mrinal Sen
- Written by: Subodh Ghosh (story)
- Produced by: Arun Kaul
- Starring: Utpal Dutt; Shekhar Chatterjee; Arati Bhattacharya
- Cinematography: K. K. Mahajan
- Music by: Vijay Raghav Rao
- Release date: 1972
- Running time: approx 115 minutes
- Country: India
- Language: Hindi

Ek Adhuri Kahani (An Unfinished Story) is 1972 Hindi language drama movie directed by Mrinal Sen. It was based on a Bengali story, Gotrantar by Subodh Ghosh.

== Cast ==
- Utpal Dutt as Ratanlal
- Shekhar Chatterjee as Nemier
- Shobha Sen
- Vivek Chatterjee as Sanjay
- Aarti Bhattacharya
- Shyam
