= Ek Din Achanak =

- DVD cover of the film
- Directed by: Mrinal Sen
- Written by: Ramapada Chowdhury (story); Mrinal Sen (screenplay)
- Starring: Shriram Lagoo; Shabana Azmi; Anil Chatterjee; Aparna Sen; Roopa Ganguly
- Cinematography: K. K. Mahajan
- Music by: Jyotishka Dasgupta
- Release date: 1989
- Running time: 105 minutes
- Country: India
- Language: Hindi

Ek Din Achanak ( English: Suddenly, One Day) is a 1989 art film directed by Mrinal Sen, based on the 1977 Bengali-language novel Beej by Ramapada Chowdhury.

== Synopsis ==
One evening, in the midst of torrential rains, a professor goes out for a walk and fails to return. As the evening stretches into days and the days into weeks with no sign of him, his family struggles to regain their footing and to understand what might have caused him to leave. Slowly they return to their daily activities. The professor's son Amit "Amu" establishes his fledgling business; his younger daughter Seema resumes her studies at college; and his elder daughter, Neeta, the backbone of the family, returns to her office job.

Behind the facade of normalcy, though, the family is deeply wounded. Amit enjoys success in his business but is bitter and dour. Seema passes with 'First Division' in College. Neeta has a very patient and supportive boyfriend Alok, but the relationship is stuck in a holding pattern. And their mother suffers debilitating depression. Their hesitant attempts to piece together the professor's state of mind before his disappearance raise more questions than they answer.

== Cast ==
- Shabana Azmi as Neeta
- Shriram Lagoo as Professor Shashank Ray (Neeta's father)
- Aparna Sen as Aparna (Student)
- Uttara Baokar as Sudha (Neeta's Mother)
- Roopa Ganguly as Seema (Neeta's sister)
- Arjun Chakraborty as Amit "Amu" (Neeta's brother)
- Manohar Singh as Neeta's uncle
- Anjan Dutt as Alok (Neeta's boyfriend)
- Lily Chakravarty as Neighbour
- Anil Chatterjee as Arunbabu

== Awards ==
- 1989: National Film Award for Best Supporting Actress: Uttara Baokar
- 1989: Venice Film Festival: OCIC Award - Honorable Mention: Mrinal Sen
