= National Film Award for Best Editing =

Indian film award

- National award for contributions to Indian Cinema
- Awarded for: Best film editing for the feature film for a year
- Sponsored by: National Film Development Corporation of India
- Rewards: Rajat Kamal (Silver Lotus); ₹2,00,000
- First award: 1976
- Most recent winner: R. Kalaivannan, Amaran (2024)

The National Film Award for Best Editing is one of the National Film Awards presented annually by the National Film Development Corporation of India. It is one of several awards presented for feature films and awarded with Rajat Kamal (Silver Lotus).

The award was instituted in 1976, at the 24th National Film Awards and awarded annually for films produced in the year across the country, in all Indian languages; Hindi (17 awards), Tamil (12 awards), Malayalam (6 awards), Bengali (4 awards), Telugu (3 awards), English and Assamese (2 awards each), and Kannada, and Marathi (one award each) The editor with the most awards in this category is A. Sreekar Prasad with seven wins.

== Multiple winners ==
7 wins : A. Sreekar Prasad

4 wins : Renu Saluja

3 wins : Gangadhar Naskar

2 wins : M. S. Mani, Suresh Pai, Kishore Te

== Recipients ==
Award includes 'Rajat Kamal' (Silver Lotus) and cash prize. Following are the award winners over the years:

List of award recipients, showing the year (award ceremony), film(s) and language(s)
Year	Recipient(s)	Film(s)	Language(s)	Refs.
1976 (24th)	K. Babu Rao	Siri Siri Muvva	Telugu	
1977 (25th)	Waman Bhonsle	Inkaar	Hindi	
1977 (25th)	Gurudutt Shirali	Inkaar	Hindi	
1978 (26th)	Gangadhar Naskar	Parasuram	Bengali	
1979 (27th)	Gangadhar Naskar	Ek Din Pratidin	Bengali	
1980 (28th)	Gangadhar Naskar	Akaler Shandhaney	Bengali	
1981 (29th)	Bhanudas Divakar	Arohan	Hindi	
1982 (30th)	Keshav Hirani	Arth	Hindi	
1983 (31st)	Mrinmoy Chakraborty	Khandhar	Hindi	
1984 (32nd)	Anil Malnad	Sitaara	Telugu	
1985 (33rd)	Babu Sheikh	Hum Naujawan	Hindi	
1986 (34th)	Sanjiv Shah	Mirch Masala	Hindi	
1987 (35th)	P. Mohanraj	Vedham Pudhithu	Tamil	
1988 (36th)	A. Sreekar Prasad	Raakh	Hindi	
1989 (37th)	Renu Saluja	Parinda	Hindi	
1990 (38th)	M. S. Mani	Iyer the Great	Malayalam	
1991 (39th)	Renu Saluja	Dharavi	Hindi	
1992 (40th)	M. S. Mani	Sargam	Malayalam	
1993 (41st)	Renu Saluja	Sardar	Hindi	
1994 (42nd)	B. Lenin	Kaadhalan	Tamil	
1994 (42nd)	V. T. Vijayan	Kaadhalan	Tamil	
1995 (43rd)	Suresh Urs	Bombay	Tamil	
1996 (44th)	A. Sreekar Prasad	Rag Birag	Assamese	
1997 (45th)	A. Sreekar Prasad	The Terrorist	Tamil	
1998 (46th)	Renu Saluja	Godmother	Hindi	
1999 (47th)	A. Sreekar Prasad	Vanaprastham	Malayalam	
2000 (48th)	Suresh Pai	Snip!	English	
2000 (48th)	Apurva Asrani	Snip!	English	
2001 (49th)	Beena Paul	Mitr, My Friend	English	
2002 (50th)	A. Sreekar Prasad	Kannathil Muthamittal	Tamil	
2003 (51st)	Aarif Sheikh	Samay: When Time Strikes	Hindi	
2004 (52nd)	Suresh Pai	Page 3	Hindi	
2005 (53rd)	P. S. Bharati	Rang De Basanti	Hindi	
2006 (54th)	Raja Mohammad	Paruthiveeran	Tamil	
2007 (55th)	B. Ajith Kumar	Naalu Pennungal	Malayalam	
2008 (56th)	A. Sreekar Prasad	Firaaq	Hindi	
2009 (57th)	Arghyakamal Mitra	Abohomaan	Bengali	
2010 (58th)	Kishore Te.	Aadukalam	Tamil	
2011 (59th)	Praveen K. L.	Aaranya Kaandam	Tamil	
2011 (59th)	N. B. Srikanth	Aaranya Kaandam	Tamil	
2012 (60th)	Namrata Rao	Kahaani	Hindi	
2013 (61st)	V. J. Sabu Joseph	Vallinam	Tamil	
2014 (62nd)	Vivek Harshan	Jigarthanda	Tamil	
2015 (63rd)	Kishore Te	Visaranai	Tamil	
2016 (64th)	Rameshwar S. Bhagat	Ventilator	Marathi	
2017 (65th)	Rima Das	Village Rockstars	Assamese	
2018 (66th)	Nagendra K. Ujjani	Nathicharami	Kannada	
2019 (67th)	Naveen Nooli	Jersey	Telugu	
2020 (68th)	A. Sreekar Prasad	Sivaranjiniyum Innum Sila Pengalum	Tamil	
2021 (69th)	Sanjay Leela Bhansali	Gangubai Kathiawadi	Hindi	
2022 (70th)	Mahesh Bhuvanend	Aattam	Malayalam	
2023 (71st)	Midhun Murali	Pookkaalam	Malayalam	
2024 (72nd)	R. Kalaivannan	Amaran	Tamil	
