= Chorus (1974 film) =

- Theatrical Poster
- Directed by: Mrinal Sen
- Written by: Mohit Chattopadhyay; Golam Kuddus; Mrinal Sen
- Produced by: Mrinal Sen Productions
- Starring: Utpal Dutt; Asit Bandopadhyay; Sekhar Chatterjee; Subhendu Chatterjee; Rabi Ghosh
- Cinematography: K. K. Mahajan
- Edited by: Gangadhar Naskar
- Music by: Ananda Shankar
- Release date: 1974
- Country: India
- Language: Bengali

Chorus is a 1974 Bengali film directed by noted Indian art film director Mrinal Sen under the banner of Mrinal Sen Productions. It was entered into the 9th Moscow International Film Festival where it won a Silver Prize.

== Synopsis ==
The film is a socio-political satire with a fairy tale opening. A bard sings praises to the gods, who have descended to Earth with the mission of creating jobs. The gods create 100 jobs, but when 30,000 applicants line up for these jobs, the result is massive unrest.

== Cast ==
- Utpal Dutt
- Asit Bandopadhyay
- Sekhar Chatterjee
- Rabi Ghosh
- Dilip Roy
- Haradhan Banerjee
- Ajoy Bannerjee
- Subhendu Chatterjee
- Gita Sen
- Rasaraj Chakraborty
- Supantha Bhattacharjee

== Awards ==
- National Film Award for Best Feature Film
- National Film Award for Best Cinematography (Black-and-white) – K. K. Mahajan
- National Film Award for Best Music Direction – Ananda Shankar
- Bengal Film Journalist Award for Best Supporting Actor- Asit Bandopadhyay
