= Satya Bandhyopadhyay =

Indian actor (1933–2006)

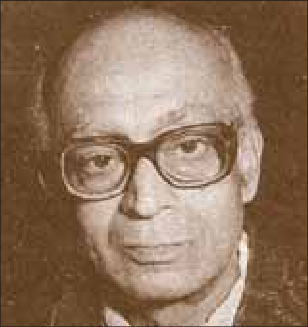
- Born: 25 September 1933; Patna, Bihar,
- Died: 30 January 2006 (aged 72)
- Occupations: Actor, script writer, accountant in the Accounts Section of Tele Communication department of Government of India
- Years active: 1952–2006

Satya Bandhyopadhyay was an Indian actor, known for his work in Bengali cinema. He acted in over 300 Plays, in numerous plays and performed frequently on the theatre.

He should not be confused with the other Bengali film personality by the same name who acted in films like 'Kuheli'.

== Early life ==
Bandyopadhyay was born on 25 September 1933 in Patna, Bihar . He studied at Lucknow Bengali school, Lucknow, Uttar Pradesh. After that, he finished his graduation from Ashutosh College which was followed by Masters in Chemistry from Science College, University of Calcutta.

== Career ==
Shri Satya Bandopadhyay began his career as an actor in Shri Utpal Dutt's " Little Theatre Group" — later renamed "People’s Little Theatre" — in 1952. He was a close associate of Shri Utpal Dutt, he has played leading roles in about 150 plays including important PLT productions like "Kallol", "Angar", "Neecher Mahal", "Mahavidroh" and "Titumir". From 1966 to 1967 he received training at the Berliner Ensemble in the German Democratic Republic. As a director he has directed about forty plays in Bengali and English. Shri Bandopadhyay has also acted in Bengali films, some of them directed by Shri Satyajit Ray and Shri Mrinal Sen. For his work in theatre and cinema, Shri Satya Bandopadhyay has been honoured with various prestigious awards.

His notable films include Ekdin Protidin (1980) by Mrinal Sen and Joy Baba Felunath (1979) by Satyajit Ray.

== Selected filmography ==
Year	Film	Director	Role
1976	Jana Aranya	Satyajit Ray	
1979	Joy baba Felunath	Satyajit Roy	
1980	Ekdin Protidin	Mrinal Sen	
1986	Tin Purush	Umanath Bhattacharya	

== Awards ==
1. Pashchim Banga Natya Akademi Award in 1982
2. Ritwik Ghatak Award in 1989
3. Sangeet Natak Akademi Award 1996
4. B.F.J.A awards
5. West Bengal Cine Award for his performance in “Ekdin Protidin”
