= Khandhar =

Khandahar
- French poster of the film
- Directed by: Mrinal Sen
- Screenplay by: Mrinal Sen; Premendra Mitra
- Based on: Telenapota Abishkar by Premendra Mitra
- Produced by: Jagadish Choukhani
- Starring: Shabana Azmi; Naseeruddin Shah; Sreela Majumdar
- Cinematography: K. K. Mahajan
- Edited by: Mrinmoy Chakraborty
- Music by: Bhaskar Chandavarkar
- Release date: 8 June 1984
- Country: India
- Language: Hindi

Khandhar (English: Ruins) is a 1984 Indian Hindi-language film directed by Mrinal Sen, based on Premendra Mitra's Bengali short story Telenapota Abishkar (Discovering Telenapota). The film stars Shabana Azmi, Naseeruddin Shah and Pankaj Kapur. It was screened in the Un Certain Regard section at the 1984 Cannes Film Festival.

== Plot ==
Three friends from the city visit some ruins where an aged mother (Gita Sen) and her daughter Jamini live. The mother awaits the arrival of a distant cousin to marry Jamini, but the man is already married and living in Calcutta. The photographer Subhash takes pity on the family and pretends to be the awaited suitor. They keep up the charade for the duration of the trio's visit, Subhash quietly becoming attracted to Jamini even as he understands the fate awaiting her. When the friends leave, Jamini stays behind, facing a life of loneliness in the ruins.

== Cast ==
- Shabana Azmi as Jamini
- Naseeruddin Shah as Subhash
- Gita Sen as The Mother
- Pankaj Kapur as Dipu
- Annu Kapoor as Anil
- Sreela Majumdar as Gauri
- Rajen Tarafder as Harihar

== Awards ==
- 1985: Chicago International Film Festival: Grand Prize (Best Film)
- 1985 Filmfare Best Screenplay Award: Mrinal Sen
- 1984 National Film Award for Best Director: Mrinal Sen
- 1984 National Film Award for Best Actress: Shabana Azmi
- 1984 National Film Award for Best Editing : Mrinmoy Chakraborty
