= Kharij =

- Theatrical release poster
- Directed by: Mrinal Sen
- Written by: Mrinal Sen; Ramapada Chowdhury
- Based on: Kharij by Ramapada Chowdhury
- Starring: Anjan Dutt; Mamata Shankar; Sreela Majumdar
- Cinematography: K. K. Mahajan
- Edited by: Gangadhar Naskar
- Music by: B. V. Karanth
- Production company: Neelkanth Films
- Release date: 1982
- Running time: 95 minutes
- Country: India
- Language: Bengali

Kharij, (Note: Bengali: খারিজ) often translated as The Case is Closed, is a 1982 Bengali film directed by Mrinal Sen and produced by Neelkanth Films. It is based on the 1974 novel of the same by Ramapada Chowdhury. It follows a Calcutta family struggling with guilt after their child servant dies from carbon monoxide poisoning in the kitchen, exposing the Bengali middle class's societal structure that upholds the status quo for social and economic survival. The film was a box office success and won the Jury Prize at the 1983 Cannes Film Festival along with widespread critical acclaim.

== Plot ==
The movie tells the story of a middle-class family whose child servant, Palan, is found dead in their kitchen, and their efforts to pacify his grieving father.

== Cast ==
- Anjan Dutt as Anjan Sen
- Mamata Shankar as Mamata Sen, Anjan's wife
- Sreela Majumdar as Sreeja
- Gita Sen as Helpful neighbor
- Sunil Mukherjee as Curious neighborhood onlooker
- Indranil Moitra as Pupai
- Dehapratim Das Gupta as Hari
- Nilotpal Dey as Inspector
- Charuprakash Ghosh as Lawyer
- Debatosh Ghosh

== Awards ==
- 1983:Golden Palm: 1983 Cannes Film Festival: Mrinal Sen: Nominated
- 1983:Jury Prize: 1983 Cannes Film Festival: Mrinal Sen.
- 1983:Second Best Feature Film: National Film Award:Mrinal Sen
- 1983:Best Screenplay:National Film Award:Mrinal Sen
- 1983:Best Art Direction:National Film Award:Nitish Roy
- 1983: Golden Spike:Valladolid International Film Festival.

== See also ==
- Palan, a 2023 spiritual sequel by Kaushik Ganguly
