= Bhuvan Shome =

1969 film by Mrinal Sen

- Film poster
- Directed by: Mrinal Sen
- Written by: Balai Chand Mukhopadhyay
- Produced by: Mrinal Sen Productions
- Starring: Utpal Dutt; Suhasini Mulay
- Narrated by: Amitabh Bachchan
- Cinematography: K. K. Mahajan
- Edited by: Gangadhar Naskar; Raju Naik; Dinkar Shetye
- Music by: Vijay Raghav Rao
- Release date: 12 May 1969
- Running time: 96 minutes
- Country: India
- Language: Hindi

Bhuvan Shome is a 1969 Indian Hindi-language drama film directed by Mrinal Sen based on a Bengali story by Balai Chand Mukhopadhyay. The cast includes Utpal Dutt (Bhuvan Shome) and Suhasini Mulay (Gauri, a village belle). The film is considered a landmark in modern Indian cinema.

This was the debut film of Suhasini Mulay. Amitabh Bachchan was the narrator.

== Plot ==
Bhuvan Shome, a widower and a dedicated and uncompromising civil servant is a senior officer in the Indian Railways. The background of the film is constructed in the context of a few railway ticket checkers discussing him as a strict, unreasonable officer ("afsar"). It continues with him being described, by the narrator, as a man whose "Bengali"-ness has not been affected by his travels. His apparent age, late 50s, is an important element of his psychology.

Inspired by the idea of hunting, Bhuvan Shome takes a "hunting holiday" to Gujarat. It is quite clear that his expedition is amateurish. He is portrayed as an inept "hunter" rather than a man who knows how to acquire a skill.

His encounter with the young Gouri is fortuitous because it is she who takes care of him and helps him "hunt" birds. She helps him through a barren wilderness, takes him home and takes care of him. When he is made to change his clothes because otherwise the "birds will know" and fly away is probably an important part of his transformation from a strict, conformist and aging man to one of a person more open to the stimuli of his environment.

Shome's subsequent hunting sojourn with Gouri is a lyrical exploration of his transformation. He is not only enamored by the simple beauty of Gouri, but also enchanted by the sights of birds on the lake and in the sky.

His hunt is "successful," but only in a way that reflects Shome's limitations as a man.

Shome is deeply affected by Gouri, who is actually schooled more than he could expect to be in that environment.

When he returns to his office chambers, he is seen to reprieve an offending railwayman. This is a sub-plot that completes the story and context of the initial narration.

== Cast ==
- Utpal Dutt as Bhuvan Shome
- Suhasini Mulay as Gauri
- Shekhar Chatterjee
- Sadhu Meher
- Punya Das
- Rochak Pandit
- Amitabh Bachchan as Narrator

== Themes ==
Bhuvan Shome is said to have pioneered the Indian New Wave. It was one of the earliest films to get funded by the National Film Development Corporation of India. The film deals with themes of monotony, solitude, camaraderie, and compassion. It also highlights the rural-urban divide in India.

== Awards ==
National Film Awards

- Best Feature Film
- Best Director - Mrinal Sen
- Best Actor - Utpal Dutt

4th International Film Festival of India

- Jury Prize for Mrinal Sen
