= Padatik (1973 film) =

Padatik, The Guerrilla Fighter
- VCD cover
- Directed by: Mrinal Sen
- Written by: Ashish Barman
- Produced by: Mrinal Sen Productions
- Starring: Dhritiman Chatterjee; Simi Garewal; Bijon Bhattacharya
- Cinematography: K. K. Mahajan
- Edited by: Gangadhar Naskar
- Music by: Ananda Shankar
- Release date: 27 September 1973
- Country: India
- Language: Bengali

Padatik (The Guerrilla Fighter) is a 1973 Bengali drama film directed by noted Parallel Cinema director Mrinal Sen, under the banner of Mrinal Sen Productions.

This film is considered to be the third film of Sen's Calcutta trilogy, the others being Interview, and Calcutta 71.

== Plot ==
A political activist escapes the prison van and is sheltered in a posh apartment owned by a sensitive young woman. Both are rebels: the activist against political treachery and the other on social level. Both are bitter about badly organized state of things. Being in solitary confinement, the fugitive engages himself in self-criticism and, in the process, questions the leadership. Questions are not allowed, obedience is mandatory. Displeasure leads to bitterness, bitterness to total rift. The struggle has to continue, both for the political activist, now segregated, and the woman in exile.

== Cast ==
- Dhritiman Chatterjee
- Simi Garewal
- Bijon Bhattacharya
- Jochon Dastidar
- Ashima Sinha
- Dhruba Mitra
- Pravas Sarkar

== Awards ==
- National Film Award for Best Screenplay - Mrinal Sen and Ashish Burman
