= Parashuram (1979 film) =

1979 film

- Theatrical poster
- Directed by: Mrinal Sen
- Written by: Mohit Chattopadhya; Mrinal Sen
- Starring: Arun Mukherjee
- Cinematography: Ranjit Roy
- Edited by: Gangadhar Naskar
- Release date: February 1979 (Berlin)
- Running time: 100 minutes
- Country: India
- Language: Bengali

Parashuram (Bengali: পরশুরাম; English title The Man with the Axe) is a 1979 Bengali drama film directed and co-written by Mrinal Sen. It was entered into the 11th Moscow International Film Festival where it won the Silver Prize.

== Cast ==
- Arun Mukherjee as Parashuram (as Arun Mukhopadhyay)
- Bibhas Chakraborty
- Sreela Majumdar as Alhadi
- Samaresh Banerjee (as Samaresh Bandyopadhyay)
- Jayanta Bhattacharya as Beggar
- Reba Roy Chowdhury
- Sujal Roy Chowdhury (as Sajal Roy Chowdhury)
- Arati Das
- Anuradha Debi (as Anuradha Deb)
- Radharani Devi
- Shailen Ganguli (as Shailen Gangopadhyay)

== Awards ==
- National Film Award for Best Actor - Arun Mukherjee
- National Film Award for Best Editing - Gangadhar Naskar
- National Film Award – Special Mention (feature film) - Mrinal Sen
