= Ninaithale Inikkum =

Ninaithale Inikkum (lit. 'Sweet Memories') may refer to:

- Ninaithale Inikkum (1979 film), an Indian Tamil-language film
- Ninaithale Inikkum (2009 film), an Indian Tamil-language film
- Ninaithale Inikkum (talk show), a 2014–2015 Indian Tamil-language talk show
- Yeh Un Dinon Ki Baat Hai, Indian Hindi-language television series, dubbed in Tamil as Ninaithale Inikkum
- Ninaithale Inikkum (2021 TV series), a 2021 Indian Tamil-language TV series

== See also ==
- Sweet Memories (disambiguation)
