= K. K. Mahajan =

Indian cinematographer (1944–2007)

- Born: 2 October 1944; Gurdaspur, Punjab, British India
- Died: 13 July 2007 (aged 62); Mumbai, Maharashtra, India
- Occupation: Cinematographer

K. K. Mahajan (2 October 1944 – 13 July 2007) was an Indian cinematographer who was known for his work in Parallel Cinema. In a career that spanned over four decades, he won four National Film Awards. He was best known for his work with filmmakers such as Kumar Shahani, Mani Kaul, Basu Chatterjee and Mrinal Sen.

Starting his career in the late 1960s, Mahajan worked simultaneously in parallel and mainstream films for the next four decades. In all he shot 84 feature films, around 100 commercials and over 20 documentaries and several television serials.

== Early life and education ==
Born to Punjabi Hindu parents in Gurdaspur in Punjab, Mahajan graduated in a physics from Panjab University, Chandigarh. Thereafter, he joined the Film and Television Institute of India (FTII) and graduated with a diploma in Motion Picture Photography in 1966 with a gold medal.

== Career ==
Mahajan started his career worked on advertising films, short films and documentaries most notably Shyam Benegal's Child of the Streets (1967), Kumar Shahani's A Certain Childhood (1967), and BD Garga's Amrita Shergil (1968) and Mahabalipuram (1968).

Prior to this, while still at FTII, he had shot, Shahani's avant garde graduation film, The Glass Pane (1966). Subsequently, upon viewing this film, Mrinal Sen offered Mahajan, Bhuvan Shome (1969), which won the National Film Award for Best Feature Film and became an important film the parallel cinema movement. This paved way for lifelong collaboration, as he went to shoot many films with Sen, including, Interview (1971), Calcutta 71 (1972), Padatik (1973), Chorus (1974), Mrigayaa (1976), Oka Oori Katha (1977), Ek Din Pratidin (1979), Akaler Sandhane (1980), Chalchitra (1981), Kharij (1982), Khandhar (1983) Ek Din Achanak (1988). Another director he worked extensively with was Basu Chatterjee; they had collaborated in films such as Piya Ka Ghar (1971), Rajnigandha (1974), Chhoti Si Baat (1975), Chitchor (1976), Swami (1977) and Manzil (1979). He also shot Ramesh Sippy's family saga on television, Buniyaad (1986), which was shot on video (high-band) and shown of state-run for Doordarshan channel.

After Char Adhyay (1997) directed Kumar Shahani he did few films, Ekti Nadir Naam directed by Anup Singh was the last film shot by him in 2002. He was diagnosed with throat cancer and as a result his voice-box was removed. Thereafter he shot no other feature film, though he shot a small documentary in 2005, directed by Kumar Shahani about the mounting of an exhibition of painter Akbar Padamsee.

In 2003, the Indian Society of Cinematographers (ISC) awarded him an Honorary Membership, along with A. Vincent and V. K. Murthy. In 2002, he received the Ezra Mir Award for Lifetime Achievement at the IDPA Awards 2005 of Indian Documentary Producers Association (IDPA).

His cancer returned in his last months and eventually he died in Mumbai on 13 July 2007. His last release was Yaar Meri Zindagi starring Amitabh Bachchan and Shatrughan Sinha. The film was shot in 1971, but released only in 2008, due to legal issues.

== National Awards ==
- 1970 – Best Cinematography for Sara Akash (black-and-white)
- 1971 – Best Cinematography for Uski Roti (black-and-white)
- 1973 – Best Cinematography for Maya Darpan (colour)
- 1974 – Best Cinematography for Chorus (black-and-white)

== Filmography ==
- Sara Akash (1969)
- Bhuvan Shome (1969)
- Uski Roti (1970)
- Ichchapuran (1970)
- Calcutta 71 (1971)
- Ashadh Ka Ek Din (1971)
- Maya Darpan (1972)
- Ek Adhuri Kahani (1972)
- Piya Ka Ghar (1972)
- Padatik (1973)
- Kunwara Badan (1973)
- Chhalia (1973)
- Us-Paar (1974)
- Rajnigandha (1974)
- Parinay (1974)
- Doosri Sita (1974)
- Chorus (1974)
- Chitchor (1976)
- Kalicharan (1976)
- Swami (1977)
- Oka Oori Katha (1977)
- Mrigayaa (1977)
- Mukti (1977)
- Tumhare Liye (1978)
- Karmayogi (1978)
- Dillagi (1978)
- Chakravyuha (1978)
- Priyatama (1978)
- Safed Jhoot (1978)
- Jeena Yahan (1979)
- Aaj Ki Dhara (1979)
- Do Ladke Dono Kadke (1979)
- Aatish (1979)
- Manzil (1979)
- Cinema Cinema (1979)
- Kasturi (1980)
- Man Pasand (1980)
- Apne Paraye (1980)
- Ek Din Pratidin (1980)
- Aap To Aise Na The (1980)
- Waqt Ki Deewar (1981)
- Sameera (1981)
- Chaalchitra (1981)
- Akaler Sandhane (1981)
- Chehre Pe Chehra (1981)
- Ramnagari (1982)
- Aadat Se Majboor (1982)
- Avtaar (1983)
- Gehri Chot: Urf - Door-Desh (1983)
- Kharij (1983)
- Tarang (1984)
- Nadaaniyaan (1984)
- All Rounder (1984)
- Khandhar (1984)
- Jawab (1985)
- Surkhiyaan (1985, The Headlines)
- Mangal Dada (1986)
- Ek Pal (1986)
- Amrit (1986)
- Sheesha (1986 TV series)
- Shesh (1988)
- Khayal Gatha (1989, documentary)
- Ek Din Achanak (1989)
- Bhrashtachar (1989)
- Amba (1990)
- Kasba (1991)
- Akayla (1991)
- Aaj Ki Taaqat (1992)
- Sahibaan (1993)
- Pratimurti (1993)
- Zamaana Deewana (1995)
- Tunnu Ki Tina (1997)
- Char Adhyay (1997)
- Ekti Nadir Naam (2002)
- Yaar Meri Zindagi (2008)
