= Calcutta 71 =

- Directed by: Mrinal Sen
- Written by: Manik Bandopadhyay; Probodh Sanyal; Samaresh Basu; Ajitesh Bannerjee
- Produced by: D. S. Pictures
- Starring: Utpal Dutt; Debraj Roy; Asit Bandopadhyay; Ajitesh Bannerjee; Satya Bannerjee; Madhabi Chakraborty; Gita Sen; Mithu Nandi
- Narrated by: A young man eternally 20
- Cinematography: K. K. Mahajan
- Edited by: Gangadhar Naskar
- Music by: Ananda Shankar
- Release date: October 12, 1972 (Kolkata)
- Running time: 101 minutes
- Country: India
- Language: Bengali

Calcutta 71 is a 1972 Bengali film directed by noted Indian art film director Mrinal Sen. This film is considered to be the second film of Mrinal Sen's Calcutta trilogy, the other two being Interview, and Padatik. The film is a collection of stories depicting the 1970s. The Naxalite movement, starvation of common people, and social and political corruption are shown. There are four disjunct subplots shown in the film.

== Plot ==
The prologue of the film follows after the plot of Interview. The main protagonist Ranjit Mallick is brought to trial in a "metaphorical" courtroom, for he undressed a mannequin wearing a suit in a tailoring shop, because he was provoked by the "audience" for his failure to ace the interview as he couldn't manage to get a suit. What follows is a satirical courtroom session, which initially concludes, that the fault is imbued in the society itself; but finding it impossible to punish the society at large, he is executed instead.

=== First Subplot ===
It is about a lower-middle-class family, as they struggle with rainfall while their stay in a cottage witihin a slum. Past midnight, when situations become completely inhabitable, they are forced to leave the cottage and move to another safe shelter. When they reach, they find out many others had already taken shelter there before them.

=== Second Subplot ===
It is about another lower-middle-class family, consisting of a single mother, and her two daughters. The family unable to cope with their impoverished conditions due to famine, the mother have pimped her daughters. It was based on the timeline Bengal famine of 1943 due to the World War II. Their cousin brother Nalinakhya, who lives in Delhi, comes to visit them, and confronts the hard reality; uneased and afraid of a blackout, he leaves for Delhi. This subplot is adapted from a short story Angar by Probodh Kumar Sanyal.

=== Third Subplot ===
It is of a rural middle-class family, where the elder son of a family is involved in smuggling rice to the city forsaking his school and education. The boys, including him, insult an abrasive bourgeoisie man for his belittling of them, by taunting he would marry his sister. He violently lashes out on that boy, beating him to the point of nosebleed; and as a revenge, the boy pushes that man off from the train, breaking the accessories he carried. Afraid of being caught by authorities, he shelters within a narrow space of the train.

=== Fourth Subplot ===
It is about a corporate concert party of the Kolkata's bourgeoisie. An hypocrite businessman discusses profound philosophies, feigning concern about the 1942 Famine of Bengal. His employee, whom he mocks by calling him thick-skinned, later scornfully remarks to other attendees that he exploits the workers of his factory. It is a sardonic portrayal of the elites.

In the final scene, confession and the encounter of a Naxalite is shown. The story is continued in Sen's film Padatik, the last film of the Calcutta Trilogy.

== Cast ==
- Debraj Roy
- Ranjit Mullick as himself.
- Utpal Dutt as the defense attorney of the mannquein.
- Haradhan Bandopadhyay
- Asit Bandopadhyay
- Ajitesh Bandopadhyay
- Satya Bandyopadhyay
- Madhabi Mukherjee
- Gita Sen
- Mithu Nandi

== Awards ==
National Film Awards for Best Second Feature Film.
