= Mohit Chattopadhyay =

Indian Bengali playwright and poet (1934–2012)

- মোহিত চট্টোপাধ্যায়
- Born: 1 June 1934; Barisal, now in Bangladesh
- Died: 12 April 2012 (aged 77); Kolkata, West Bengal, India
- Education: University of Calcutta
- Occupations: Playwright, screenwriter, dramatist and poet
- Writing career
- Language: Bengali

Mohit Chattopadhyaya (also spelled Mohit Chattopadhyay) (1 June 1934 – 12 April 2012) was a Bengali Indian playwright, screenwriter, dramatist and poet. He was a leading figure in modern Indian drama. Mohit Chottopadhya died on 12 April 2012 due to throat cancer.

== Early life ==
Mohit Chattopadhyaya was born in the town of Barisal, now in Bangladesh. He left Bangladesh and immigrated to Calcutta (Kolkata) with his family at the age of thirteen. An avid reader, he started writing as a young boy. In Kolkata, he was a frequent visitor of Chaitanya Library, near his home at Bidon Street. In the library he stumbled upon Six Characters in Search of an Author by Luigi Pirandello, his first contact with an absurd play. He finished his Matriculation examination in 1950 and joined City College, Kolkata. While studying in City College he became close to culturally like-minded people, who became prominent poets, authors, artists in their later lives. He became close friend with Sunil Gongopadhyay, Shibshmbhu Pal, Soumitra Chatterjee, Sandipan Chattopadhyay, Shakti Chattopadhay. He earned his master's degree in Bengali literature as a private candidate from University of Calcutta. His career in academia began as a lecturer at Jangipur College, Murshidabad and later as a Reader of Bengali Literature at City College.

== Literary work ==
Mohit Chattopadhyaya started his literary career as a poet and later shifted to writing plays. He started writing prose poetry along with his friends, and had little interest in rhyming. At first his poetry was published in various magazines and shortly it was published in book format as his anthology of poems.

Subsequently, he stopped writing poems and devoted entirely to writing plays. From the very beginning he avoided writing realistic plays and wrote esoteric often highly political plays. Though he refused to be labelled as an Absurdist playwright, claiming his plays do not conform to the Philosophy of "The Theatre of the Absurd" but frequently he is referred as an exponent of Indian Absurd Drama. The cryptic nature of his plays encouraged critics to call his plays "Kimitibadi" (Kim+Iti) in Bengali, which in English meant, "What is it?”

As a prolific playwright he has written over one hundred plays. Some of his plays have been translated in different languages and have been regularly performed by various theatre groups around India. Other than full-length plays, Mohit Chattopadhyaya has written One Act plays, Verse plays Curtain Raisers, Microplays; he has adapted, edited and translated a number of plays in Bengali from other languages.

His play Raajrakto (Guinea pig) is considered as a milestone in the history of Bengali political drama. Kolkata based theatre group Theatre Workshop under the direction of Bibhash Chokrobarty first performed the play in Kolkata. Later the play was translated into various languages. In Delhi Rajindernath directed the Hindi version. Famous actor Kulbhushan Kharbanda acted in the play. In Mumbai, Satyadeb Dubey directed the play and Amrish Puri acted in it. Amol Palekar acted in the Marathi version and Shymanand Jalan produced another Hindi version of the play. For political reasons the production was banned by The Indian Government.

== Film scripts and television scripts ==
In 1973 Mohit Chattopadhyaya started working on the film script of Chorus in close collaboration with Mrinal Sen. He also wrote the lyrics of the songs used in the film. In the following years he wrote the screenplays of four films by Mrinal Sen, Mrigaya (1976) Poroshuraam (1980), Oka Uri Katha (1977), Genesis (1986); all the films received numerous awards in national and International film festivals. In 1997 he wrote the screenplay and the lyrics of the film, Damu, which received National Award for best children's film and various other awards.

In 1980 Mohit Chattopadhyaya finished his first and only directorial endeavour, Megher Khela (The Play of The Clouds), a children's film. He wrote the story and the screenplay. Raja Sen, who would become an accomplished film director later, was the assistant director; Ranajit Ray was the Cinematographer; Debashish Dasgupta was the music director and Mrinmoy Chakrobarty was in charge of editing. The film received critical acclaim. It was shown in various national and international film festivals and got honorary mention at Bucharest Children's Film Festival. Austrian National Television bought the film rights and telecast it in its National Channel.

Mohit Chattopadhyaya started writing scripts for TV serial (TV Series) in the following years. Raja Sen directed almost all his early TV scripts. Subarnolata, Arogyonikatan, Adorsho Hindu Hotel marked one of the most popular and critically acclaimed television serials on Kolkata Doordarshan. He continued writing scripts and worked with other directors in later period.

== Other work ==
Mohit Chattopadhyay has also written numerous essays, articles and papers on theatre, film production, and scriptwriting. One of his most controversial series of essays has been on the relationship between literature and drama. He has taken part in various seminars, talks, workshops and panel discussions on literature and performing arts. He is also the Executive Member of Paschimbanga Natya Academy.

== Honors and awards ==
The recipient of scores of awards and felicitations, Mohit Chattopadhyay received the Sangeet Natak Academy Award in 1991. Among other awards he is the recipient of Girish Award, West Bengal State Award, BFJA Award, Nandikaar Award. He is also conferred with Sangeet Natak Akademi Tagore Ratna, special awards to commemorate 150th birth anniversary of Rabindranath Tagore

== Plays ==
- Kantha Nalite Surjo 1963
- Neel Ranger Ghora 1964
- MrityuSambad 1969
- Cheler Dol
- Gandho Rajer Hattali 1965
- Metamorphosis 1965
- Chondroloke Ognikando 1966
- Dwiper Raja 1968
- Singhasoner Khoyrog 1967
- Nishad 1968
- Pushpok Rath 1968
- Will Shakespeare 1969
- BaghBondi 1969
- Captain Hurrah 1970
- RaajRakto/ Guniepig 1974
- Mrichhokatik 1990
- Mahakalir Baachha 1977
- Swadeshi Naksha 1985
- Galileo-r Jwibon 1981
- Kanamaachi Khela 1983
- Bhoot 1983
- Aalibaba 1985
- Totaraam 1990
- Socrates 1989
- Nonaajwal 1990
- Baman 1987
- Sundor 1998
- Jochonakumari 1991
- Shamibrikha 1990
- Takhan Bikel 1992
- Lobhendra Gobendra 1990
- Guhachitra 1993
- Gojanan Charit Manas 1993
- Mushthijog 1994
- Janmodin 1999
- Octopus Limited 1997
- Kaal Ba Porshu 1997
- Bipanno Bismoy 1998
- Swidhidata 1999
- Harun Ul Rashid 1999
- Tushagni 2000
- Jambo 2001
- Mr. Right 2003
- Kaaler Jatra 2004
- Mrs. Soriano 2004
- Ghoom/ Ei Ghoom 2003
- Ring 1965
- Bairer Dwarjaa 1965
- Brittyo 1968
- Baajpaakhi 1969
- Sonaar Chaabi 1973
- Laathi 1977
- Maachi 1978
- Phoenix 1984
- Raakhos
- Bornobiporjoy
- Juto 2003
- Dwarpon
- Taattoo
- kouto
- Venice-er Bonik 2004
- Daaho 2007
- Mayer moto
- Hiramon
- Naak
- Sesh raksha (edited)

== Verse plays ==
- Wrikbaidik (1986)
- Podoshbdo
- Maharaaj
- Rangeen Kaach
- Dooswapno
- Kaaraadondo

== Film ==
- Megher Khelaa (direction, Screenplay) 1980 [Awarded in Bucharest Children's Film Festival, Shown in Austria National Television]
- Chorus (Co scripted with Mrinal Sen, Lyrics) [1974]
- Mrigaya (Co scripted with Mrinal Sen) [1976]
- Poroshuraam (Story & Co scripted with Mrinal Sen) [1980]
- Oka Uri Katha (Co scripted with Mrinal Sen) [1977]
- Genesis (Co scripted with Mrinal Sen) [1986]
- Damu (Screenplay & Lyrics) [1997]

== Television series (tele-serials) ==
- Subranalata (Screenplay) (1987)
- Adarsha Hindu Hotel (Screenplay) (1989)
- Arogya Niketan (Screenplay) (1993)
- Bankim Sahitye Naari (screenplay) (1989)
- Headmaster (Screenplay)
- Anjuman (Screenplay) (1996)
- Tarashankarer Chhoto Galpo (Screenplay) (1991)
- Streeyascharitram (Screenplay)
- Jal Pade Pata Nade (Screen Play) (1994)
- Hansuli Banker Upokatha (Screen Play)
- Chena Achena (Screenplay)

== Documentary scripts ==
- Itihasher Kolkata
- Suchitra Mitra (1993) [National Award for the best film in the Art and Cultural Section]

== Poetry ==
- Ashare Srabon (1956)
- Golaaper Birudhe Joodhyo (1961)
- Shobadhare Jyotsna (1965)
- Onkon Shikhya (1969)
- Bhalobasha Bhalobasha (1993)
- Kobita Sangroho (1993)
