= Akaler Shandhaney =

Akaler Sandhane (In Search of Famine)
- Theatrical release poster
- Directed by: Mrinal Sen
- Written by: Mrinal Sen; Amalendu Chakraborty
- Produced by: D. K. Films
- Starring: Dhritiman Chatterjee; Smita Patil; Gita Sen; Rajen Tarafdar; Sreela Mazumder; Radhamohan Bhattachariya; Jayanta Chowdhury; Dipankar De; Jochhan Dastidar
- Cinematography: K. K. Mahajan
- Edited by: Gangadhar Naskar
- Music by: Salil Chowdhury
- Release date: 1982
- Running time: 115 minutes
- Country: India
- Language: Bengali

Akaler Shandhaney (Bengali: আকালের সন্ধানে; lit. "In Search of Famine") is a 1982 Indian Bengali-language film directed by Mrinal Sen.

== Plot ==
In September 1980, a film crew comes to a village to make a film about a famine, which killed five million Bangalis in 1943. It was a man-made famine, a side-product of the war, and the film crew will create the tragedy of the millions who died of starvation. The film documents the convivial life among the film crew and the hazards, problems and tension of filmmaking on location. The actors live a double life, and the villagers, both simple and not-so-simple, flock to watch their work with wonder and suspicion. But as the film progresses, the recreated past begins to confront the present. The uneasy coexistence of 1943 and 1980 reveals a bizarre connection, involving a village woman whose visions add a further dimension of time—that of the future. A disturbing situation, indeed, for the "famine-seekers"!

== Cast ==
- Dhritiman Chatterjee
- Smita Patil
- Gita Sen
- Rajen Tarafdar
- Sreela Mazumder
- Radhamohan Bhattachariya
- Jayanta Chowdhury
- Dipankar De
- Jochhan Dastidar
- Biplab Chatterjee

== Awards ==
- 1981 – National Film Award for Best Feature Film
- 1981 – National Film Award for Best Direction (Mrinal Sen)
- 1981 – National Film Award for Best Screenplay (Mrinal Sen)
- 1981 – National Film Award for Best Editing (Gangadhar Naskar)
- 1981 – 31st Berlin International Film Festival – Silver Bear – Special Jury Prize.
