= Interview (1971 film) =

- Directed by: Mrinal Sen
- Written by: Ashis Barman
- Produced by: Mrinal Sen Productions
- Starring: Ranjit Mallick; Karuna Banerjee
- Narrated by: Ranjit Mallick
- Cinematography: K. K. Mahajan
- Edited by: Gangadhar Naskar
- Music by: Vijay Raghav Rao
- Release date: 13 November 1971 (West Bengal)
- Running time: 101 min.
- Country: India
- Language: Bengali

Interview is a 1971 Bengali film directed by noted Indian art film director Mrinal Sen. It was the debut film of Ranjit Mallick. Although it was a film on the colonial hangover, it touched on diverse issues like anti-establishment, middle class cowardice, and unemployment.

This film is considered to be the first film of Mrinal Sen's Calcutta trilogy, the others being Calcutta 71, and Padatik.

== Plot ==
Ranjit Mallick is a smart personable young man. A friend of the family, who works in a foreign firm, has assured him of a lucrative job in his firm. All Ranjit has to do is come to an interview, dressed in a western style suit.

It seems like a simple enough task, but fate intervenes. A strike by a labour union means that he cannot get his suit back from the laundry. His father's old suit won't fit him. He borrows a suit, but loses it in a fracas in a bus. Ultimately he has to go to the interview dressed in the traditional Bengali dhoti and kurta.

== Cast ==
- Ranjit Mallick as Ranjit
- Karuna Banerjee as Ranjit's Mother
- Shekhar Chatterjee as Shekhar Uncle, a family friend
- Bulbul Mukherjee as Ranjit's girlfriend
- Mamata as Ranjit's elder sister
