= Asit Bandopadhyay =

Bengali dramatist (1936–2020)

- Born: 1936
- Died: 17 September 2020 (aged 84); Kolkata, West Bengal, India
- Education: Maharaja Manindra Chandra College
- Occupations: Actor, Playwright, Dramatist, Screenwriter
- Children: Arnab Banerjee, Avra Banerjee, Abir Banerjee

Asit Bandopadhyay (or Banerjee) (1936 – 17 September 2020) was a Bengali playwright, screenwriter, actor and director. He was associated with the Nandikar theater group. He lived and worked in Kolkata, India.

== Early life and theatre ==
He developed an interest in drama as a student in Kolkata's Manindra Chandra College, an affiliated undergraduate college of the University of Calcutta, in 1955. He joined the drama group Bohurupee as a trainee in 1959 and completed a year's course under the tutelage of Sambhu Mitra. At maternal uncle's house of Asit Banerjee at B K Pal Avenue, in presence of Ajitesh Banerjee and some friends Dipen Sen Gupta, Satyen Mitra, Mahesh Singha, Asit Banerjee co-founded 'Nandikar' on June 29, 1960. Members of the party's first executive committee were elected: President Ajitesh Banerjee & Secretary Asit Banerjee.

== Nandikar and Mitra Sammilani ==
From 1960 to 1972, he was involved with Nandikar in all of his early productions, including six characters in search of a playwright, Sher Afghan, Manjari Mango Manjari, When Alone, Bitangs and Three Paisa Pala. He directed the plays Parineeta and Purbabagh at Nandikar. Asit Bandyopadhyay's only role at Tin Poishar Pala (Three Penny Opera) was a duality in the genre of Brecht's acting, his character revealed a fact of history and social evolution in a dialectical coexistence. In this production, Asit Bandopadhyay played the role of Jatindranath Pal, a rich beggar-businessman. His performance is still immortalized in the minds of the audience. The founder of the Bhikkhu Ashram - the trainer of the beggars - his seven humorous performances of cruelty, surpassing his skill as a behind-the-scenes organizer, brought lasting fame to one of the most famous actors of all time.

This was the golden age of Nandikar which witnessed Ajitesh Bandopadhyay, Asit Bandopadhyay, Rudra Prasad Sengupta and Keya Chakraborty in many plays together.

In Coochbihar he had a brief stance as an actor, director, playwright. He was there in the early seventies for job and got involved in drama. The Banga Sahitya Sammelan was organized at that time on the grounds of Jenkins School in Coochbihar. There he played the lead role in the poetic story drama, accompanied by prominent actors and actresses from Coochbihar. He was thereafter transferred from Coochbihar to Siliguri where he joined the Mitra Sammilani. As Mitra Sammilani entered a golden age of drama, as an actor and director he revolutionized the drama scene in North Bengal and witnessed the most significant event in the history of Mitra Sammilani. This group staged Bitangsha, Kabikahini, Ek JE chilo Ghora, Suryobodol (which is written by himself)and few other plays he wrote and staged himself. He also went to Calcutta with the Siliguri team. The Mitra Sammilani staged plays at Rangana and the academy in Calcutta in 1965. Under him, Mitra Sammilani rose from a local theater group outside Siliguri to a prominent theater group.

== Dramatist ==
He came back to Calcutta in 1978, he became the writer and director of Jatra Natak (folk drama). He has written, directed and staged about 60 plays, which have been performed all over West Bengal to name a few Banik Barir Bou, Daini, Pagla Raja, Kalo Meyer Kanna, Hira Jhiler Kanna Kumari Janani, Bangali Babu, Khora Badsha, Kohinoor, Mahajaner Meye, Jangli, Koch Devyani, Billomangal, Biddya Sundor, Chanakya, Qurbani, Pagla Doctor, etc.

== Film, Television, Radio ==
He acted in Mrinal Sen's Chorus, Kolkata 71, Mrigaya, Mahaprathibi. He received special acclaim for his performances in Nabyendu Chattopadhyay's National Award-winning film Parashuram's Kuthar, Atmaja O Shilpi and Chidananda Dasgupta's Amodini. He wrote the script for several Bengali films. He appeared and wrote scripts for radio and television serials for Doordarshan Kendra Kolkata and All India Radio. He was associated with Draupadi's screenplay, Mohini and some other serials. When Tarun Majumdar directed 'Durgeshanandini' on Doordarshan, Asit Bandopadhyay co-scripted the screenplay.

Towards the end of Nandikar's episode, when Girish Chandra's 'Prafulla' directed by Natmancha Sthapati Samiti Mitra was aired on Kolkata Betar on September 26, 1971, he played the role of Ramesh alongside Shambhu Mitra, Tripta Mitra, Ajitesh Bandopadhyay, Keya Chakraborty, Rudraprasad Sengupta & others. Post his return to Calcutta, he acted in the play 'Rang Badlay', Idur and many other radio plays. The radio dramas he acted in for ten years from 1995 to 2005. He was involved in a number of productions on Kolkata Doordarshan, notably "Chandra Hata" (he played the lead role in the screenplay and the lead role), and in the lead role in "Sri Sri Siddheshari Limited" directed by Meghnad Bhattacharya.

He has also collaborated with legends Soumitra Chatterjee, Gulzar and many others of repute in various live stage performances.

== Recognition ==
In 1979 and 1999, he was twice awarded the Best Director of the Government of West Bengal. He won Dishari Award, Pramathesh Chandra Barua Award, Shantigopal-Tapan Kumar Award, Uttam Kumar Award and others. He won the Bengal Film Journalists Association Awards for Best Supporting Actor for his performance in Mrinal Sen's Chorus.

== Death ==
Bandopadhyay died on 17 September 2020, after contracting COVID-19 in a nursing home in August, during the COVID-19 pandemic in India. He was 84.
