= Mrinal Sen =

Indian film director (1923–2018)

Mrinal Sen MP
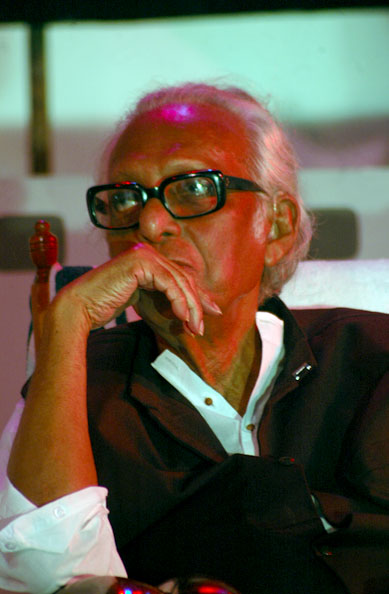
- Pronunciation: [mɾinal ʃen]
- Born: 14 May 1923; Faridpur, Bengal Presidency, British India
- Died: 30 December 2018 (aged 95); Bhawanipore, Kolkata, West Bengal, India
- Education: University of Calcutta
- Occupation: Director
- Years active: 1955–2002
- Works: Filmography
- Spouse: Gita Sen (m. 1952; died 2017)
- Awards: Padma Bhushan (1983); Ordre des Arts et des Lettres (1985); Order of Friendship (2000); Dadasaheb Phalke Award (2003)

Member of Parliament, Rajya Sabha (nominated)
- In office 27 August 1997 – 26 August 2003

6th President of Film and Television Institute of India
- In office 9 April 1984 – 30 September 1986
- Preceded by: Shyam Benegal
- Succeeded by: Adoor Gopalakrishnan

Mrinal Sen (Note: Bengali: [mɾinal ʃen].) (Bengali: [mɾinal ʃen]; 14 May 1923 – 30 December 2018) was an Indian film director and screenwriter known for his work primarily in Bengali, and a few Hindi and Telugu language films. Regarded as one of the finest Indian filmmakers, along with his contemporaries Satyajit Ray, Ritwik Ghatak, and Tapan Sinha, Sen played a major role in India's parallel cinema movement, which offered a realistic, socially aware counterpoint to splashy Bollywood films, as well as in the country's New Wave cinema. He also served as the President of FTII from 1984 to 1986.

Sen received various national and international honors including eighteen Indian National Film Awards. The Government of India honored him with the Padma Bhushan, and the Government of France honored him with the Ordre des Arts et des Lettres, while the Russian Government honored him with the Order of Friendship. Sen was also awarded the Dadasaheb Phalke Award, the highest award for filmmakers in India.

He was one of the few Indian filmmakers to have won awards at the big three film festivals viz., Cannes, Venice and the Berlinale. Sen was a self-described "private Marxist".

== Early life ==
Mrinal was born into a Mahishya kshatriya family in Faridpur district, East Bengal—now Bangladesh. His father, Dineshchandra Sen, was a lawyer who supported Indian freedom fighters. His mother was Saraju Sen.

In the early 1940s, Mrinal moved to Kolkata to study physics at Scottish Church College. Like many middle-class students of the time, he was drawn to student politics, public theatre, and the struggle to find work. After the Partition in 1947, his family permanently settled in Kolkata.

A voracious reader, he spent hours at the National Library of India (then the Imperial Library), reading books amid the political unrest of the time. In the evenings, he worked as a private tutor. One day, he came across Rudolf Arnheim's Film as Art, followed by Vladimir Nilsen's The Cinema as a Graphic Art—books that profoundly influenced his journey into filmmaking.

He became involved with the Indian People's Theatre Association (IPTA), backed by the Communist Party of India. He and his friends—Ritwik Ghatak, Salil Chowdhury, Tapan Sinha, and occasionally Bijan Bhattacharya—spent hours in adda, a Bengali tradition of intense, freewheeling discussions on art, politics, and life. Their favorite meeting place was a restaurant near Basusree Cinema hall, where, in 1955, they first watched Satyajit Ray's Pather Panchali.

Around this time, Mrinal met Geeta Shome (née Sen), whom he married in 1953. As a token of his affection, the first gift he gave her was Notes from the Gallows by Julius Fučík.

== Influence ==
Mrinal Sen directed Bhuvan Shome (Mr. Shome, 1969), which initiated the "New Wave Cinema Movement" in India.

=== Film craft, social context and its political influence ===
The films that he made next were essentially political, and earned him the reputation as a Marxist artist. This was also the time of large-scale political unrest throughout India. Particularly in and around Calcutta, this period underwent what is now known as the Naxalite movement. This phase was immediately followed by a series of films where he shifted his focus, and instead of looking for enemies outside, he looked for the enemy within his own middle-class society. This was arguably his most creative phase.

=== Depiction of Kolkata ===
In many Mrinal Sen movies from Punascha (1961) to Mahaprithivi (1992), Kolkata features prominently. He has shown Kolkata as a character and as an inspiration. He has woven the people, value system, class differences, and the roads of the city into his movies and coming-of-age for Kolkata, it is his El Dorado.

== Recognition ==
In 1982, he was a member of the jury at the 32nd Berlin International Film Festival. In 1983 he was a member of the jury at the 13th Moscow International Film Festival. In 1997, Sen became a member of the jury at the 20th Moscow International Film Festival. On 24 July 2012, Sen was not invited to the function organised by Government of West Bengal to felicitate film personalities from the state. As per reports, his political views are believed to be the reason for his omission from the function.

== Death ==
Sen had age-related ailments for many years. He died on 30 December 2018 at the age of 95 at his home in Bhawanipore, Kolkata. The cause was a heart attack.He passed away at 10:30 a.m.

== Awards ==
=== National Film Awards ===
Best Feature Film

- 1969: Bhuvan Shome
- 1974: Chorus
- 1976: Mrigayaa
- 1980: Akaler Sandhane

Second Best Feature Film

- 1972: Calcutta 71
- 1980: Kharij

Best Direction

- 1969: Bhuvan Shome
- 1979: Ek Din Pratidin
- 1980: Akaler Sandhane
- 1984: Khandhar

Best Screenplay

- 1974: Padatik
- 1983: Akaler Sandhane
- 1984: Kharij

Special Mention

- 1978: Parashuram

=== Best Regional Film Awards ===
Best Feature Film in Bengali

- 1961: Punascha
- 1965: Akash Kusum
- 1993: Antareen

Best Feature Film in Santali

- 1977: Oka Oori Katha

=== Filmfare Awards ===
Critics Award for Best Film
1976 Mrigayaa
Best Screenplay
1984 Khandhar
Best Director - Bengali
1982 Akaler Shandhaney
Filmfare Lifetime Achievement Award
2017 Bengali Cinema

=== International awards ===
4th International Film Festival of India - Jury Prize - Bhuvan Shome - 1969
Moscow International Film Festival - Silver Prize – Parashuram
1975 Chorus – 1979

Karlovy Vary International Film Festival - Special Jury Prize
1977 Oka Oori Katha

Berlin International Film Festival
Interfilm Award
1979 Parashuram
1981 Akaler Sandhane
Grand Jury Prize
1981 Akaler Sandhane

Cannes Film Festival - Jury Prize
1983 Kharij

Valladolid International Film Festival - Golden Spike
1983 Kharij

Chicago International Film Festival - Gold Hugo
1984 Khandhar

Montreal World Film Festival - Special Prize of the Jury
1984 Khandhar

Venice Film Festival - OCIC Award - Honorable Mention
1989 Ek Din Achanak

Cairo International Film Festival - Silver Pyramid for Best Director
2002 Aamar Bhuban

== State and institutional honors ==
- In 1979, he was awarded the Nehru Soviet Land Award by the Union of Soviet Socialist Republics for his contribution to world cinema.
- In 1981, the Government of India awarded Sen with the Padma Bhushan.
- In 1985, President François Mitterrand, the President of France, awarded him the Commandeur de Ordre des Arts et des Lettres (Commander of the Order of Arts and Letters)
- In 1993, he was awarded an honorary D.Litt. by the University of Burdwan.
- In 1996, he was awarded an honorary D.Litt. by Jadavpur University.
- In 1999, he was awarded an honorary D.Litt. by Rabindra Bharati University.
- Between 1998 and 2003, he was made an Honorary Member of the Indian Parliament in the Rajya Sabha.
- In 2000, President Vladimir Putin of the Russian Federation honored him with the Order of Friendship.
- In 2005, the Dadasaheb Phalke Award, the highest honor given to an Indian filmmaker, was awarded to him by the Government of India for the year 2003.
- In 2009, he was awarded an honorary D. Litt., by the University of Calcutta.
- In 2017, he was inducted as a member of the Oscar Academy

== Filmography ==
- Raat Bhore (The Dawn) (1955)
- Neel Akasher Neechey (Under the Blue Sky) (1959)
- Baishe Shravana (Wedding Day) (1960)
- Punascha (Over Again) (1961)
- Abasheshe (And at Last) (1963)
- Pratinidhi (The Representative) (1964)
- Akash Kusum (Up in the Clouds) (1965)
- Matira Manisha (Man of the Soil) (Odia film) (1966)
- Bhuvan Shome (Mr. Bhuvan Shome) (1969)
- Ichhapuran (1970)
- Interview (1971)
- Ek Adhuri Kahani (An Unfinished Story) (1971)
- Calcutta 71 (1972)
- Padatik (The Guerilla Fighter) (1973)
- Chorus (1974)
- Mrigaya (The Royal Hunt) (1976)
- Oka Oori Katha (The Outsiders) (1977)
- Parashuram (The Man with the Axe) (1978)
- Ek Din Pratidin (And Quiet Rolls the Dawn) (1979)
- Akaler Shandhaney (In Search of Famine) (1980)
- Chalchitra (The Kaleidoscope) (1981)
- Kharij (The Case Is Closed) (1982)
- Khandhar (The Ruins) (1983)
- Genesis (1986)
- Kabhi Door Kabhi Paas (1986–87) (12 short films made for television broadcast)
- Ek Din Achanak (Suddenly, One Day) (1989)
- Mahaprithibi (World Within, World Without) (1991)
- Antareen (The Confined) (1993)
- Amar Bhuvan (This, My Land) (2002)

== See also ==
- Nabyendu Chatterjee
- Sekhar Das
- Anjan Dutt
- Aniruddha Roy Chowdhury
- Nandita Das
