= List of Mumbai venues =

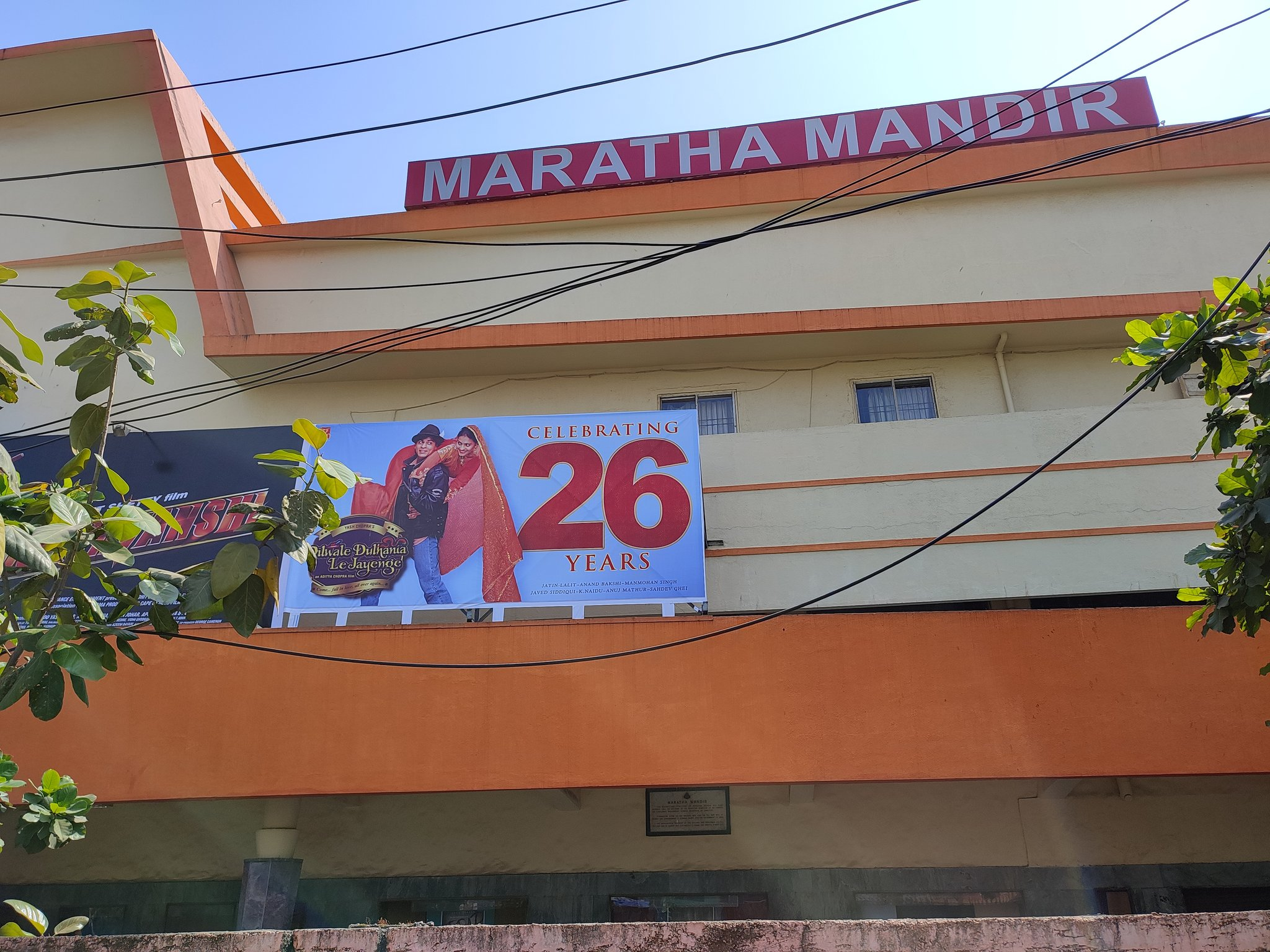
DDLJ 26 Years Maratha Mandir

This is a list of cinemas in the city of Mumbai, India. Mumbai has long been associated with films, with the first film being displayed here in 1896 by the Lumière Brothers. It, thereafter, became the centre of India's Hindi and Marathi language film industries, with the former often dubbed as Bollywood. The first cinema opened in 1913. Mumbai has many cinemas catering to a large and polyglot population. Cinemas often serve as major landmarks in the city and define the neighbourhood. Most of the cinemas in the city are one-screen halls, but in recent times, these have been giving way to large multiplexes.

Recently some cinemas, (often interchangeably called "theatres") have been forced to shut shop due to the high entertainment tax (which stands at 55%), that results in huge losses. Since 2000, 50 cinemas have shut down in the city. Mumbai is known for its entertainment industry so there are a lot of cinemas. Such One Example is Maratha Mandir which is known for playing Dilwale Dulhania Le Jayenge for almost 26 years being a single screen cinema and Multiplexes. There are also IMAX venues operated by PVR INOX, Cinépolis, and others.

== Performance venues and Auditoriums ==
=== South Mumbai ===
- Yashwantrao Chavan Centre Auditorium, Nariman Point
- National Centre for the Performing Arts, Nariman Point
  - Jamshed Bhabha Theatre (NCPA), Nariman Point
  - Tata Theatre (NCPA), Nariman Point
  - Experimental Theatre (NCPA), Nariman Point
  - Godrej Dance Theatre (NCPA), Nariman Point
  - Little Theatre (NCPA), Nariman Point
- BSE International Convention Hall, Kala Ghoda
- Lokshahir Anna Bhau Sathe Natyagruha, Byculla
- Sahitya Sangh Mandir, Girgaon
- Royal Opera House (Mumbai), Girgaon
- Tejpal Auditorium, Grant Road
- G5A Foundation for Contemporary Culture, Mahalaxmi
- Nehru Science Centre and Nehru Centre Auditorium, Worli
- Metro INOX Cinemas,Metro INOX Cinemas

=== Central Mumbai ===
- Damodar Hall, Parel
- Ravindra Natya Mandir, Prabhadevi
- P. L. Deshpande Maharashtra Kala Academy, Prabhadevi
- Shivaji Mandir, Dadar
- Veer Savarkar Smarak Auditorium, Dadar
- Yashvant Natya Mandir, Matunga Road
- Shanmukhanand Hall, Maheshwari Udyan, Matunga
- Kala Sadan, Sion

=== Eastern Suburbs ===
- Jio World Convention Centre, Bandra Kurla Complex
- Neeta Mukesh Ambani Cultural Centre (NMACC), Bandra Kurla Complex
  - The Grand Theatre (NMACC), Bandra Kurla Complex
  - The Studio Theatre (NMACC), Bandra Kurla Complex
  - The Cube (NMACC), Bandra Kurla Complex
- Zaverben Popatlal Auditorium, Ghatkopar
- Sahakar Nagar Natyagruha, Chembur
- TISS Convention Centre, Govandi
- D.A.E. Convention Centre, Anushakti Nagar
- Victor Menezes Convention Centre, Powai
- Mahakavi Kalidas Natyamandir, Mulund

=== Western Suburbs ===
- St. Andrew’s Auditorium, Bandra
- Rang Sharda Auditorium, Bandra
- Bal Gandharva Rang Mandir, Bandra
- Jeff Goldberg School of Performing Arts, Bandra
- Dorangos Hall, Bandra
- Master Dinanath Natygruh, Vile Parle
- Prithvi Theatre, Juhu
- Veda Kunba Theatre by Veda Factory, Andheri
- Chaubara by Veda Factory, Versova
- Veda Black Box by Veda Factory, Versova
- Mukti Manch, Versova
- Rangshila Theatre Group, Versova
- Harkat Studios, Versova
- NESCO Convention Centre, Goregaon
- Gateway Convention Centre , Goregaon
- ASPEE Auditorium, Malad
- Raghuleela Auditorium, Kandivali
- Prabodhankar Thackeray Natyagruha, Borivali

=== Thane and Beyond ===
- Gadkari Rangayatan, Thane
- Dr. Kashinath Natyagruha, Thane
- Savitribai Phule Natyagruha, Dombivali
- Atre Rang Mandir, Kalyan
- Meenatai Thackeray Theatre, Bhiwandi

=== Navi Mumbai ===
- Vishnudas Bhave Natygruh, Vashi
- Krantiveer Phadke Auditorium, Panvel

=== Vasai-Virar , Palghar and Dahanu Road ===
- Sativali Sabhagruh, Vasai
- Thakur College Auditorium, Vasai
- Chimaji Appa Sabhagruha, Virar
- Dr. Babasaheb Ambedkar Sabhagruh, Palghar
- Taluka Krida Sankul, Dahanu Road

== Single-screen theatres ==
Cinema	Location	Ref.		
Regal Cinema	Colaba			
Eros Cinema IMAX (Now Multiplex)	Churchgate			
Edward Talkies	Dhobi Talao			
Roxy Cinema	Charni Road			
Alfred Theatre	Grant Road			
Imperial Cinema	Grant Road			
Royal Talkies	Grant Road			
Nishat Talkies	Grant Road			
New Roshan Talkies	Grant Road			
Gulshan Theatre	Grant Road			
Shalimar Cinema	Grant Road			
Silver Cinema	Grant Road			
Moti Talkies	Grant Road			
Super Plaza Cinema	Grant Road			
Maratha Mandir	Mumbai Central			
Premier Gold Cinema	Dongri			
Chitra Cinema	Dadar			
Plaza cinema, Mumbai	Dadar			
Citylight Cinema	Mahim			
Paradise Cinema	Mahim			
Bahar Cinema	Vile Parle (E)			
Kasturba Cinema	Malad			
Mayur Cinema	Kandivali			
Ajanta Cinema	Borivali (W)			
Anand Cinema	Thane			
K K Cinema	Kamothe			
Gopi Cinema	Dombivali			
KT Vision Cinema	Vasai			
Aman Theatre	Ulhasnagar			
Venus Cinema	Ulhasnagar			
Woodland Cinema	Virar			
Vaishali Cinema	Badlapur			
Liberty Cinema (Standby for Special Screenings/Festivals)	Marine Lines			
Royal Opera House (Mumbai) (Standby for Special Screenings/Festivals)	Charni Road			
Films Division of India NMIC/NFDC (Standby for Special Screenings/Festivals)	Pedder Road			
Ravindra Natya Mandir (Standby for Special Screenings/Festivals)	Prabhadevi			
PL Deshpande Mini Theatre (Standby for Special Screenings/Festivals)	Prabhadevi			
NMACC (Standby for Special Screenings/Festivals)	BKC			
Capitol Cinema (Mumbai) (Temporary Closed)	Fort			
New Empire Cinema (Mumbai) (Temporary Closed)	Fort			
Central Cinema (Temporary Closed)	Girgaon			
Novelty Cinema (Temporary Closed)	Grant Road			
Apsara Cinema (Temporary Closed)	Grant Road			
Alankar Cinema (Temporary Closed)	CP Tank			
Palace Cinema (Temporary Closed)	Byculla			
Star Talkies (Temporary Closed)	Dockyard Road			
New Shirin Talkies (Temporary Closed)	Mahalxmi			
Bharatmata Cinema (Temporary Closed)	Currey Road			
Geeta Cinema (Temporary Closed)	Worli			
Matterdan (Deepak Cinema) (Temporary Closed)	Prabhadevi			
Premier Cinema (Temporary Closed)	Parel			
Sharda Cinema (Temporary Closed)	Dadar			
IMAX Dome Theatre (Temporary Closed)	Wadala			
Arora Cinema (Temporary Closed)	Matunga			
Sahakar Plaza (Temporary Closed)	Tilak Nagar			
Kings Talkies (Temporary Closed)	Kurla (W)			
Kamran Talkies (Temporary Closed)	Kurla (W)			
Kalpana Talkies (Temporary Closed)	Kurla (W)			
Amar Cinema (Temporary Closed)	Chembur (E)	'		
Sharad Cinema (Temporary Closed)	Chembur (E)			
Natraj Cinema (Temporary Closed)	Chembur (W)			
Ankur Cinema (Temporary Closed)	Govandi			
Chandan Cinema (Temporary Closed)	Juhu			
Navrang Cinema (Temporary Closed)	Andheri (W)			
Mehul Talkies (Temporary Closed)	Mulund (W)			
Anand Cinema	Thane (E)			
Pratap Cinema (Temporary Closed)	Thane			
Vandana Cinema (Temporary Closed)	Thane			
Ganesh Theatre (Temporary Closed)	Thane			
Ashok Cinema (Temporary Closed)	Thane			
Malhar Talkies (Temporary Closed)	Thane			
Movie Time (Old Rajeshri Cinema) (Temporary Closed)	Dahisar (E)			
Coronation Cinematograph and Variety Hall 1st Cinema Hall of Mumbai (Permanently Closed)	Girgaon			
The American-India (Permanently Closed)	Girgaon			
The New Alhambra (Permanently Closed)	Sandhurst Road			
The Olympia (Permanently Closed)	Sandhurst Road			
Strand Cinema (Permanently Closed)	Colaba			
Majestic Cinema (Permanently Closed)	Girgaon			
Ganga Jamuna (Permanently Closed)	Grant Road			
Diana Theatre (Permanently Closed)	Grant Road			
Swastik Cinema (Permanently Closed)	Grant Road			
Daulat Cinema (Permanently Closed)	Grant Road			
Dreamland Cinema (Permanently Closed)	CP Tank			
Minerva Cinema (Permanently Closed)	Mumbai Central			
Alexandra Cinema (Permanently Closed)	Mumbai Central			
Satyam-Shivam-Sachinam (Permanently Closed)	Worli			
Ganesh Talkies (Permanently Closed)	Lalbaug			
Kismat Talkies (Permanently Closed)	Prabhadevi			
Bandra Talkies (Permanently Closed)	Bandra (W)			
Pinki Cinema (Permanently Closed)	Andheri (E)			
Ambar-Oscar-Minor (Permanently Closed)	Andheri (W)			
Saaz Cinema (Permanently Closed)	Bhandup (W)			
Naaz Cinema (Permanently Closed)	Grant Road			
Jaya Talkies ( closed)	Borivali west		Diamond Talkies (closed)	Borivali west

== Multiplexes ==
Cinema	Location	Ref.
PVR Cinemas	ICON Phoenix Palladium, Lower Parel, Mumbai	
PVR Cinemas	Luxe Phoenix Palladium, Lower Parel, Mumbai	
PVR Cinemas	Maison PVR - Library Hall, Jio World Drive, BKC	
PVR Cinemas	Maison PVR - The Loft - Luxe, Jio World Drive, BKC	
PVR Cinemas	Maison PVR - Living Room - Luxe, Jio World Drive, BKC	
PVR Cinemas	Jio Drive-In Theatre, Jio World Drive, BKC	
PVR Cinemas	Market City, Kurla (Premiere)	
PVR Cinemas	Luxe, Market City, Kurla	
PVR Cinemas	Phoenix Market City, Kurla (4DX)	
PVR Cinemas	Le Reve- Globus Mall, Bandra (W)	
PVR Cinemas	Odeon Mall, Ghatkopar (E)	
PVR Cinemas	Dynamix, Juhu	
PVR Cinemas	Lido, Juhu	
PVR Cinemas	C&B Square (Old Sangam Theatre), Andheri (E)	
PVR Cinemas	City Mall, Andheri (W)	
PVR Cinemas	ICON Infiniti, Andheri (W)	
PVR Cinemas	Luxe, Infiniti, Andheri (W)	
PVR Cinemas	ICON Oberoi Mall, Goregaon (E)	
PVR Cinemas	Infiniti, Malad (W)	
PVR Cinemas	Infiniti, Malad (W) (4DX)	
PVR Cinemas	Milap, Kandivali (W)	
PVR Cinemas	Growel, Kandivali (E)	
PVR Cinemas	Lodha Xperia, Palava, Dombivali (E)	
PVR Cinemas	Orion Mall, Panvel	
PVR Cinemas	Haseen, Bhiwandi	
PVR Cinemas	The Capital Mall, Nalasopara (E)	
INOX	Metro INOX Cinemas, Marine Lines	
INOX	Laserplex: CR2 Nariman Point	
INOX	Insignia at Atria Mall, Worli	
INOX	Nakshatra Mall, Dadar (W)	
INOX	Maison Jio World Plaza, BKC	
INOX	Neelyog, Ghatkopar (E)	
INOX	R-City Mall, Ghatkopar (W)	
INOX	Raghuleela Mall, Vashi	
INOX	Palm Beach Galleria Mall, Vashi	
INOX	Megaplex Inorbit Mall, Malad	
INOX	Thakur Movie, Kandivali (E)	
INOX	Raghuleela Mall, Kandivali (W)	
INOX	Thakur Mall, Dahisar	
INOX	Korum Mall, Eastern Express Highway, Thane	
INOX	Insignia at R Mall, Thane	
INOX	Sky City Mall, Western Express Highway, Borivali (E)	
INOX	Metro Mall Junction, Kalyan (E)	
Miraj Cinemas	Anupam Cinemas, Goregaon (E)	
Miraj Cinemas	Miraj IMAX, Wadala	
Miraj Cinemas	Thakur Cinemas, Kandivali (E)	
Miraj Cinemas	R Mall, Mulund (W)	
Miraj Cinemas	V Cinemas, Dombivali	
Miraj Cinemas	Cineraj Cinemas, Panvel	
Miraj Cinemas	Dattani Cinemas, Vasai	
Miraj Cinemas	Fun Fiesta Cinemas, Nallasopara	
Miraj Cinemas	Star, Ambarnath	
Miraj Cinemas	Funcity, Ulhasnagar	
Miraj Cinemas	Ashok Anil Multiplex, Miraj Cinemas, Ulhasnagar	
Moviemax	Moviemax Sion	
Moviemax	Moviemax Huma, Kanjurmarg	
Moviemax	Moviemax Andheri (E)	
Moviemax	Moviemax Goregaon (W)	
Moviemax	Moviemax Sona Shopping Center, Kandivali (W)	
Moviemax	Moviemax Wonder Mall, Thane (W)	
Moviemax	Moviemax Eternity Mall, Thane (W)	
Moviemax	Moviemax Mira Road	
Moviemax	Moviemax V Cinema, Virar (E)	
Cinépolis	Fun Republic Mall, Andheri (W)	
Cinépolis	Magnet Mall, Bhandup (W)	
Cinépolis	Seawoods Nexus Mall, Navi Mumbai	
Cinépolis	Cinema Star: High Street Mall, Thane	
Cinépolis	Viviana Mall, Thane	
Cinépolis	K Star Mall, Chembur (E)	
Cinépolis	VIP Viviana Mall, Thane	
Mukta A2 Cinemas	New Excelsior, Fort	
Mukta A2 Cinemas	Roxy Cinema, Charni Road	
Mukta A2 Cinemas	Jai Hind, Lalbaug	
Mukta A2 Cinemas	Orion, Santacruz	
Mukta A2 Cinemas	Suncity, Vile Parle	
Mukta A2 Cinemas	Topiwala, Goregaon	
Gold Cinema	Gold Cinema (Old Hindmata Cinema), Dadar (E)	
Gold Cinema	Gold Cinema, Santacruz (W)	
Gold Cinema	Gold Cinema, Malad Malvani	
Gold Cinema	Sona, Borivali (E)	
Gold Cinema	Gold Cinema (Old Prabhat Cinema), Shivaji Road, Thane	
MovieTime Cinemas	Star City, Matunga (W) (Old Baadal-Barkha-Bijli Cinema)	
MovieTime Cinemas	Suburbia, Bandra (W)	
MovieTime Cinemas	Cubic Mall, Dr CG Road, Chembur (E)	
MovieTime Cinemas	The Hub, Goregaon	
MovieTime Cinemas	Movie Time, Malad	
Carnival Cinemas (Temporary Closed)	Carnival Moviestar, Goregaon	
Carnival Cinemas (Temporary Closed)	Carnival Dream Mall, Vasai	
Carnival Cinemas (Temporary Closed)	Carnival Annex Mall, Borivali	
Carnival Cinemas (Temporary Closed)	Carnival IMAX, Wadala	
Carnival Cinemas (Temporary Closed)	Carnival Harmony Mall, Oshiwara	
Maxus Cinemas	Sakinaka	
Maxus Cinemas	Borivali (W)	
Maxus Cinemas	Bhayander	
BMX Cinemas (Balaji Movieplex)	Koparkhairane	
BMX Cinemas (Balaji Movieplex)	Littleworld, Kharghar	
Sterling Cineplex	Fort	
G7 Multiplex	Bandra (W)	
Bharat Cineplex	Kurla (W)	
Fun Cinemas	K Star Mall, Chembur (E)	
Rajhans Cinemas	Rajhans Helix (Old Shreyas Cinema),Lal Bahadur Shastri Marg, Ghatkopar (W)	
Fun Square Cinema	Sanpada	
NY Cinemas	(Old Jai Ganesh Talkies) Mulund (E)	
Rassaz Multiplex	Mira Road	
Tilak Cineplex	(Old Pooja Cinema) Dombivali (E)	
SM5 Cinema	Kalyan	
KT Vision Cinema Screens	Vasai (W)	
Rockstar Nova Cinemaz	Virar (W)	
Max Movies Centurion Mall (Temporary Closed)	Nerul	
Cinemax Spring Mall (Temporary Closed)	Kalyan	
Glomax Mall (Permanently Closed)	Kharghar	

== 4DX ==
Cinema	Location	Ref.
Cinépolis	Viviana Mall, Thane West (4DX)	
Cinépolis	Nexus Mall, Seawoods (4DX)	
PVR	Phoenix Market City, Kurla (4DX)	
PVR	Cinemax, Infiniti Mall, Malad (4DX)	
INOX	Inorbit Mall, Malad (4DX) INOX R city, Metro INOX Cinemas , Marine Lines ||	
