= Sandhya Mendonca =

Indian writer, editor and publisher

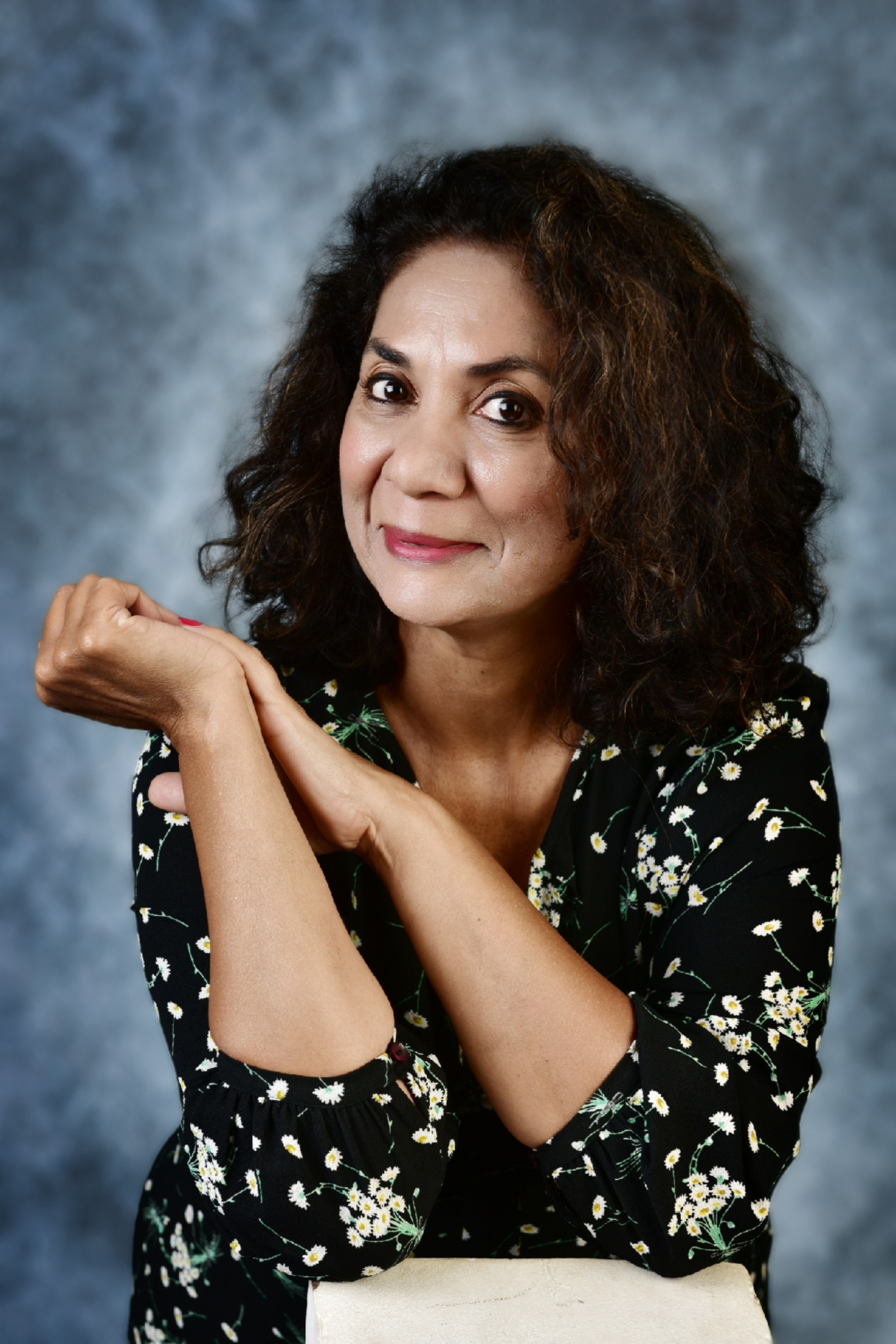
Sandhya Mendonca, Indian Author & Publisher

Sandhya Mendonca is an Indian writer, author, biographer, editor and publisher. Born in Bengaluru (Bangalore) in the state of Karnataka, India, she gained a BA in Economics, Political Science & Sociology from St. Joseph's College of Arts & Science and an MA in Political Science specialising in International Relations from Bangalore University. She has a Diploma in Public Relations from the Bharatiya Vidya Bhavan. She lives in Bengaluru.

== Career ==
Sandhya Mendonca worked as a journalist for over sixteen years before co-founding a media company with her husband and veteran journalist Allen Mendonca (1960 - 2009), Raintree Media, of which she is the Managing Director & Editor-in-Chief. She is also the mentor at TheGoodCity.in, a web and mobile-based curated content platform, and the Festival Director of Under The Raintree women's cultural festival, India's first multi-arts festival curated by women.

A native Kannadiga, Mendonca is a chronicler of the cultural history of the state of Karnataka through books published by Raintree Media such as Karnataka - A Cultural Odyssey, Raj Bhavan Bangalore - Through the Ages, Marvels of Karnataka & more and many others. She is the co-author of Marvels of Mysore & More, published in 2012. This book has been hailed by author Shashi Deshpande, and editor-in-chief of Outlook, Krishna Prasad. In 2015, Marvels of Karnataka & More was translated into Kannada as Karnatakada Vismayagalu (ಕರ್ನಾಟಕದ ವಿಸ್ಮಯಗಳು).

Her book Disrupt and Conquer - How TTK Prestige Became A Billion Dollar Company co-authored with Mr. TT Jaggannathan (Chairman of TTK Group), was published by Penguin Random House in 2018. It featured in Amazon Editor's picks of Memorable Books of 2018, and Best of Business & Leadership of 2018.

Random House also published her earlier book on the REVA electric car Reva EV - India's Green Gift to the World (co-authored with Dr. SK Maini), in 2013. Her autobiographical stories are published in the Chicken Soup for the Indian Couples' Soul & Chicken Soup for the Indian Singles' Soul series, both a part of the international Chicken Soup for the Soul series, published in India by Tata Westland in 2012.

In 2019, she edited and published the Augmented Reality embedded Innovate Bengaluru, which features the top 100 innovators and enablers in Bengaluru's ecosystem. The book was launched in April 2019 at the Innovate Bengaluru Festival, which brought together over 300 Icons, Inventors, Entrepreneurs, Emerging Leaders, Enablers and Investors.

She co-authored with Nafees Fazal, the latter's memoir, 'Breaking Barriers - The Story of a Liberal Muslim Woman's Passage in Indian Politics' published by Konark Publishers in 2022.

She co-authored ‘Busted - Debunking Management Myths with Logic, Experience And Curiosity’ with Ashok Soota, a pioneer of the Indian IT industry and Peter de Jager, a Canadian management consultant. It was published by HarperCollins Publishers / Harper Business in 2023. https://www.amazon.in/Busted-Ashok-Soota-ebook/dp/B0CB97C5J4

She extensively edited the autobiography of Justice Shivaraj V Patil, former Supreme Court judge, Chief Justice of Rajasthan High Court and judge of the Madras and Karnataka High Courts. It was published by Sparsh Foundation in 2024. https://www.newindianexpress.com/states/karnataka/2024/Jan/22/justice-shivaraj-patil-releases-memoir

Mendonca hosts a podcast and talk show "Spotlight with Sandhya" that features one-to-one conversations on inspirations and journeys. She writes a fortnightly column, Female Gaze, for The Sunday Guardian.https://sundayguardianlive.com/user/sandhyatsggmail-com

== Arts ==
Mendonca is an amateur actor and has acted in an original play about child sexual abuse Shadows on the Wall written and directed by Vijay Nair and a comedy about golf Sliced Balls written by Poile Sengupta. She most recently acted in Robi's Garden directed by veteran director Vijay Padaki of Bangalore Little Theatre. She has written lyrics to a ballad In This Moment, set to music by Sriram Aravamudan.

In 2009, Mendonca started an informal initiative in memory of her husband, Under the Raintree, that hosted play readings, artistic interactions and concerts. Starting with the dramatised reading of Anita Nair's Nine Faces of Being when it was a work in progress to concerts and talks, this initiative engages artistes with audiences in informal, intimate settings.

In 2015, Mendonca was inspired to form the SHE Collective Hub, giving expression to the voices of women through poetry and art for social good. In sync with artists like Shan Re and Romicon Revola, poets Poile Sengupta & Kavita Rajshekar, among others, she offered the forum of SHE Collective Hub to The Casa Foundation, the House of Hope and the Dream India Network. The House of Hope provides 24-hour care to over a hundred AIDS-affected orphans and their siblings. Dream India Network nurtures the most vulnerable and socially excluded children and provides them a safe haven.

In 2017, both these initiatives coalesced, and Mendonca created Under The Raintree women's cultural festival. Held over three days in Ravindra Kalakshetra, Bengaluru, the festival had more than 200 participating artistes. More than 6000 people attended the festival. The 2nd edition in Nov 2017, was registered at the United Nations Partnerships for SDGs, and provided the stage for 42 events across 7 stages, featuring the voices of over 150 Writers, Poets, Musicians, Artists and Scientists.

== Speaker Events ==
Mendonca frequently speaks and moderates panels at literary, industry and corporate events such as:

- Speaker at Graduation Day 2023 of The Yenepoya Institute of Arts, Science, Commerce, Yenepoya (Deemed to be University, Mangaluru, October 2023
- Expert Talk at Garden City University, Bangalore, October 2023
- Workshop at Indus Business Academy, September and October 2023
- 4th Dr Maya Rao Kathak & Choreography Conference, May 2022
- 'Aura with Author', Dayanand Sagara College of Engineering, June 2022
- Mompower, July 2022
- The inaugural session of Dell Women Entrepreneur Network (DWEN) on: "Innovation through Collaboration"
- "Are we truly winning in this rat race", a panel discussion organised by GoFloaters in 2019
- "Is this the easiest time to be a woman?", a panel discussion organised by the Inner Wheel Club, Bengaluru, in 2019
- TEDx Ramaiah Medical College, speaking about "Culture as a Change Agent" in 2018
- (WO)Manifesto, a discussion about women's representation in politics in 2018
- The release of Lingayata Philosophy, authored by Basrur Subba Rao in 2016
- "U25 LIT Fest", organised by the Under25 Club in 2016
- "Forging Links, Leveraging Networks - An International Business Convention for Entrepreneurial Women", organised by eMERGE in 2016
- "Celebrating International Women's Day", hosted by Accenture in 2015
- The release of A Lifetime in Choreography, the autobiography of Maya Rao in 2014

== Awards and recognition ==
- Sandhya Mendonca was conferred the Desha Snehi award from the India Development Foundation for qualitative journalism and humanitarian concern in November 2015.
- She received the Global Achievers Foundation award for outstanding contribution to national unity & economic growth in February 2016.
- The Institution of Engineers, Karnataka State Centre, felicitated her for yeoman service to society in March 2016.
- She received the Shrama Saadhana Shining Star award for achieving success through professional excellence from the ISBR, ELCIA & PRCI in May 2016.
- Garden City University honoured her as an inspirational woman on International Women's Day, 2019.
- She was conferred the 'Distinguished Leadership Award' at the 'Corporate Excellence Awards 2022' by the University of Engineering & Management and the Institute of Engineering & Management in September 2022.
- She was presented with the title 'Global Woman Leader' at the 10th World Women Leadership Congress in February 2023.
- She's the charter president of the Rotary Bangalore Social and a past member of the Rotary Club of Bangalore, Mendonca is also a Paul Harris Fellow of the International Rotary fellowship.
