= Minerva Theatre =

Minerva Theatre may refer to:

- Minerva Theatre, Chichester
- Minerva Theatre, Kolkata
- Minerva Theatre, Mumbai, see list of cinemas in Mumbai
- Minerva Theatre, Sydney
