= Sébastien Surel =

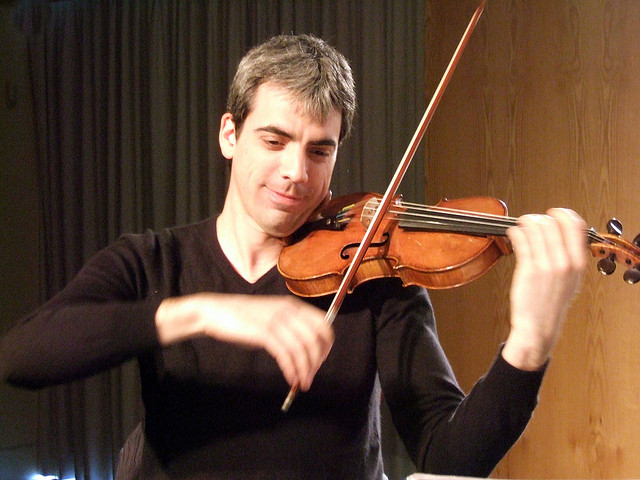
Sébastien Surel

Sébastien Surel (born 11 January 1975) is a French classical violinist.

== Biography ==
Surel entered the Conservatoire de Paris at the age of fifteen and studied in Sylvie Gazeau's and Christian Ivaldi's classes. There he won two first prizes.

He then perfected his skills with Shlomo Mintz, Pavel Vernikov, György Sebők and the Ysaÿe Quartet. He also studied harmony, orchestration and musical composition.

He later played in various symphony orchestras as concertmaster, then as a tenured member of the Orchestre philharmonique de Radio France from 2000 to 2003.

In 2004, he founded the Talweg Trio now composed of the pianist Romain Descharmes and the cellist Éric-Maria Couturier. The Trio marked an important turning point in his musical life. Supported by Martha Argerich, they were invited to festivals in Europe and Asia. Their first record, Tchaikovsky and Shostakovich, received a "Diapason d'or". They also recorded Johannes Brahms's complete trios, which received much critical attention.

He is the co-founder and artistic director of the Parisian music season La Chambre d'Amis.

He collaborates with artists such as Roland Pidoux, Henri Demarquette, Abdel Rahman El Bacha, Michel Moraguès, the Trio Wanderer, the musicians of the Ébène Quartet, Claire Désert, Paul Radais and Aurélien Sabouret.

His repertoire includes the complete concertos of Mozart, Mendelssohn, Tchaikovsky, Beethoven, Sibelius, Barber and Chausson's Poème.

He plays on stages all over the world, like the Barbican Center (London), the Théâtre des Champs-Élysées, the Théâtre de la Ville and the Théâtre du Châtelet (Paris), the Concertgebouw (Amsterdam), the Accademia Nazionale di Santa Cecilia (Rome), the Centre for Fine Arts, Brussels, the Dresde opera, the Kioi Hall and the Metropolitan Art Center (Tokyo) or at the jazz festivals of Montreux, Vienna, Montréal, Marciac and Nice.

He plays in various musical styles with artists such as Juanjo Mosalini, Tomás Gubitch, Jean-Philippe Viret, Vincent Ségal and Richard Galliano with whom he has given more than 500 concerts worldwide.

Surel also teaches violin and chamber music. He has been holder of the Certificate of Aptitude for violin since 2011.

He plays a 1788 violin from Giovanni Battista Guadagnini.

== Discography ==
Talweg Trio

- Tchaikovsky's Trio, Op. 50; Shostakovitch, Trio n° 1, Op. 8 (February 2008, Triton TRI 331156) OCLC 652392194
- Marcel Cominotto (2013, Azur Classical)
- Brahms's Trios for piano, Op. 8, 87 and 101 (28–30 November/5–6 December 2011, 2CDs Pavane Records ADW 7566/7) OCLC 893901663

With Richard Galliano

- Bach - Richard Galliano, Jean-Marc Phillips, Jean-Marc Apap (1–2 September 2009, Deutsche Grammophon) OCLC 609567474
- Vivaldi - Richard Galliano, Jean-Marc Phillips, Jean-Marc Apap (June 2012, Deutsche Grammophon) OCLC 853501834

Others

- Jean-Philippe Viret, Supplément d'âme - Jean-Philippe Viret, doublebass; David Gaillard, viola; Éric-Maria Couturier, cello (February 2012, Mélisse) OCLC 871210097
- Mosalini-Terrugi Cuarteto, Tango Hoy - Juanjo Mosalini, bandoneon; Leonardo Teruggi, doublebasse, Romain Descharmes, piano (June 2014, M&T)
