= Javed Siddiqui =

Indian writer

- Born: 13 January 1942 (age 84); India
- Occupations: Screenwriter; dialogue writer; playwright
- Years active: 1977–present
- Children: Lubna Salim, Sameer Siddiqui, Murad Siddiqi, Zeba Siddiqi
- Awards: Filmfare Awards (1994, 1996); Screen Award (1996)
- Website: javedsiddiqi.com

Javed Siddiqui (born 13 January 1942) is a Hindi and Urdu screenwriter, dialogue writer and playwright from India. He has written over 50 storylines, screenplays and dialogues.

During his career, Siddiqi has collaborated with some of India's most prominent filmmakers, from independent directors like Satyajit Ray and Shyam Benegal to commercial directors like Yash Chopra and Subhash Ghai. He has become an integral part of Indian cinema, in both commercial and art cinema fields.

Siddiqi has won two Filmfare Awards, two Star Screen Awards, and one BFJA Award. In 2010, he announced his association with Tumbhi where he would review artists and their artwork.

== Cinema and television ==
After having graduated in Urdu Literature from Rampur, Javed Siddiqui moved to Bombay (now Mumbai) in 1959, where he worked as a professional journalist for various Urdu dailies like Khilafat Daily and Inquilaab. Soon after that, he went on to lead his own newspaper, Urdu Reporter.

He started his career as a dialogue writer in Satyajit Ray's Shatranj Ke Khilari in 1977.

Since then, he has been highly regarded for his works in different genres of film making, including art films or parallel cinema, like Umrao Jaan, Mammo, Fiza, Zubeidaa and Tehzeeb; as well as commercial hits, such as Baazigar, Darr, Yeh Dillagi, Dilwale Dulhania Le Jayenge, Raja Hindustani, Pardes, Chori Chori Chupke Chupke and Koi... Mil Gaya.

He has also written scripts for serials like Shyam Benegal's Bharat Ek Khoj, Ramesh Sippy's Kismet, Yash Chopra's Waqt and others.

== Theatre ==
Siddiqi has worked in theatre. He was national vice-president of Indian People's Theatre Association (IPTA), and later contributed to the origin and functioning of the Marathi IPTA, and has been associated with it as a national member.

His play Tumhari Amrita, an adaptation of A R Gurney's classic American play Love Letters attained cult success. It had only two actors (Shabana Azmi and Farooq Sheikh) reading out letters to each other with neither change of set or costume. It ran for 21 years until Farooq Sheikh's death on 28 December 2013, and is one of the longest-running plays in India. Since its debut at Prithvi Theatre on 27 February 1992, the play has been performed all over the world, including a performance at the United Nations, the first Indian play to do so.

This was followed by Saalgirah, starring actress Kirron Kher, a play dealing with the complexity of divorce in modern urban life.

Siddiqui has ventured into various domains, from Bertolt Brecht to more contemporary themes in his adaptations. He has adapted Brecht's play Puntilla and several of his other works. His play Andhe Choohe, based on Agatha Christie's The Mousetrap, is one of the world's longest-running dramas. Critic Vijay Nair wrote "Javed Siddiqui's lines are as poignant as ever. They leap out of the letters as little gems. At times they plead with the incoherence of hurts long stifled. At times they flare up like little flames scorching the audience. At times they soothe like fresh raindrops after a scorching summer. But at all times they have a life of their own and make their presence felt like an invisible third character on stage." His play 1857: Ek Safarnama set in the Indian Rebellion of 1857 was staged at Purana Qila, Delhi ramparts by Nadira Babbar and National School of Drama Repertory company, in 2008.

His plays include Hamesha, Begum Jaan, Aap Ki Soniya and Kacche Lamhe.

=== Personal life ===
Javed Siddiqui belongs to the family of great freedom fighters, Mohammad Ali Jouhar and his brother Maulana Shaukat Ali. His father was an assistant librarian at Raza Library.

His early education was in Rampur's Hamid High School and Jaame-ul-uloom, Furqaniah. He passed his high school in English in Aligarh Muslim University. At the age of 17, he moved to Bombay and under the guidance of his uncle Maulana Zahid Shaukat Ali, Javed started his career as a journalist in his Urdu newspaper Khilafat Daily. He worked in newspapers such as Inquilab and Hindustan and then started his own newspaper named Urdu Reporter.

Siddiqui started his career in films as a dialogue writer and assistant director to Satyajit Ray in Shatranj Ke Khilari. He also assisted James Ivory as chief assistant director.

Siddiqui has four children. Two of them, Lubna Salim and Sameer Siddiqui, are involved in film and theatre.

== Urdu literature ==
In 2012, Siddiqui wrote a book of pen sketches named Roshandan. The book was published from Delhi and later on it was republished from Ajj, Karachi. A comprehensive review on the book was written by Karachi-based writer and researcher on Ibne Safi, Rashid Ashraf which was published in Karachi renowned Urdu magazine Quarterly Ijra in 2012.

Siddiqui started the second part of Roshandan with the first pen sketch on Satyajit Ray (Kya Aadmi Tha Ray) which was published in Mumbai's literary magazine Naya Warq and later on in Ajj, Karachi, March 2013.

== Awards ==
- 1994 Filmfare Award for Baazigar Best Screenplay
- 1996 Filmfare Award for Dilwale Dulhania Le Jayenge Best Dialogues
- 1996 Screen Award for Raja Hindustani Best Screenplay

== List of works ==
=== Film writer ===
- Shatranj Ke Khilari (1977)
- Chithegu Chinthe (1978)
- Bara (Sookha) (1980)
- Ali Baba aur 40 Chor (1980)
- Umrao Jaan(1981) (dialogue)
- Chakra (1981)
- Sohni Mahiwal (1984)
- Do Dilon Ki Dastaan (1985)
- Naam O Nishan (1987)
- Mar Mitenge (1988)
- Aakhri Adaalat (1988)
- Shukriyaa (1988)
- Guru (1989)
- Ilaaka (1989)
- Baaghi A Rebel for Love (1990)
- Anjali (1990)
- Adharm (1992) (dialogue)
- Baazigar (1993)
- Dhanwaan (1993)
- Darr (1993)
- Mammo (1994)
- Chauraha (1994)
- Yeh Dillagi (1994)
- Zamaana Deewana (1995)
- Gaddaar (1995)
- Hum Dono (1995)
- Dilwale Dulhania Le Jayenge (1995)
- Chaahat (1996)
- Raja Hindustani (1996)
- Pardes (1997)
- Duplicate (1998)
- Jab Pyaar Kisise Hota Hai (1998)
- Angaaray (1998)
- Barood (1998)
- Soldier (1998)
- Dahek A Burning Passion (1998)
- Dil Kya Kare (1999)
- Taal (1999)
- Tera Jadoo Chal Gayaa (2000)
- Fiza (2000)
- Raju Chacha (2000)
- Zubeidaa (2001)
- Chori Chori Chupke Chupke (2001)
- Albela (2001)
- Kya Yehi Pyaar Hai (2002)
- Pyaar Diwana Hota Hai (2002)
- Hum Kisi Se Kum Nahin (2002)
- Koi Mil Gaya (2003)
- Zameen (2003)
- Tehzeeb (2003)
- Dil Maange More (2004) : co-written with Anant Mahadevan, Kiran Kotrial
- Blackmail (2005)
- Banaras (2006)
- Humko Tumse Pyar Hai (2006)
- Dus Kahaniyan (2007)
- Sadiyaan (2010)
- Battle Of Saragahi

=== Plays ===
- Tumhari Amrita
- Saalgirah
- Hamesha
- Begum Jaan
- Aap ki Soniya
- Kacche Lamhe
- Dhuaan
- Aur Agle Saal
- Kate hue Raaste
- Patjhad se Zara Pehle
- Shyam Rang
- Who Ladki
- Raat
- Mogra
- Maati Kahe Kumhar Se
- Peele Patton ka Ban
- Kharaashein
- Lakeerein
- Humsafar
- Gudamba
