= Vijay Nair =

Vijay Nair may refer to:

- Vijay Nair (author), Indian writer
- Vijayan Nair, American statistician
- Vijay Nair, co-founder of Only Much Louder, an Indian artist management and event management company
