= Feroz Abbas Khan =

Indian theatre and film director, playwright, and screenwriter

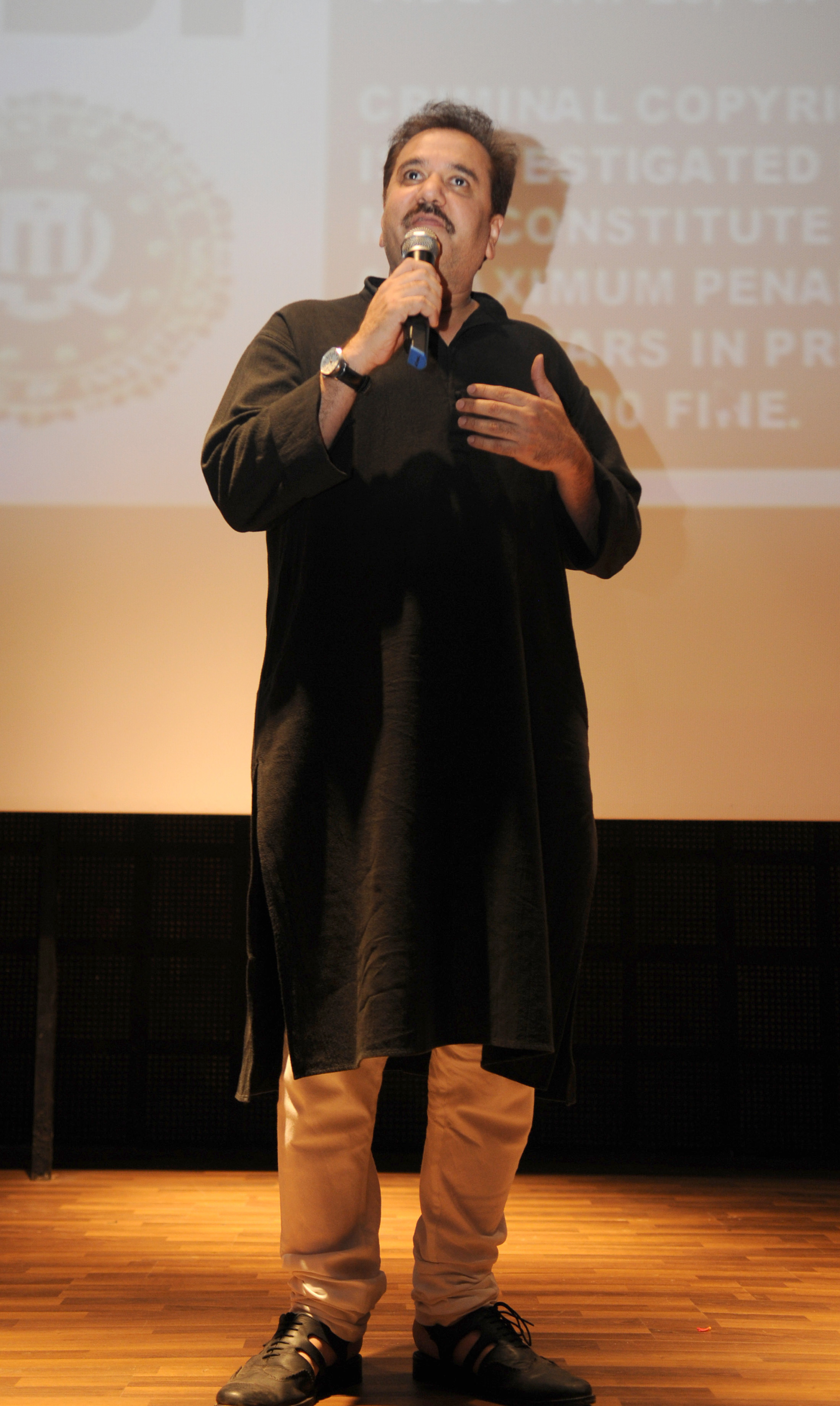
- Feroz Abbas Khan, IFFI (2011)
- Born: 1959 (age 66–67)
- Occupations: Playwright, theatre director, film director, screenwriter
- Website: www.ferozkhan.com/fz_feroz.htm

Feroz Abbas Khan is an Indian theatre and film director, playwright and screenwriter, who is most known for directing plays like Mughal-e-Azam, Saalgirah, Tumhari Amrita (1992), Salesman Ramlal and Mahatma v/s Gandhi.

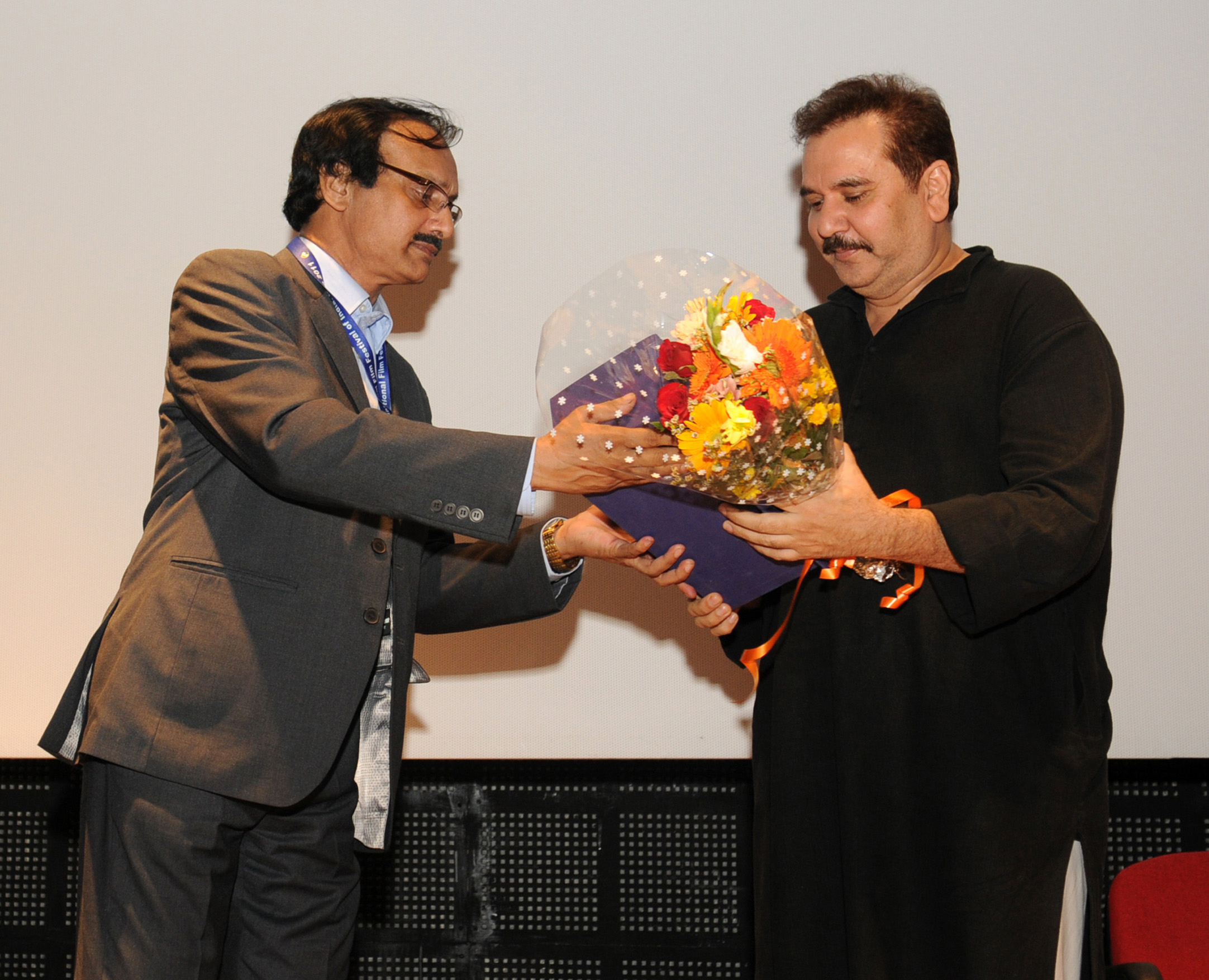
Khan being felicitated at IFFI (2011)

== Career ==
He was the first artistic director of the Prithvi Theatre in Mumbai and in 1983 was head of the Prithvi Theatre Festival with Jennifer Kapoor and Akash Khurana. He started with productions like the early comedy All the Best and Saalgirah (1993), written by playwright Javed Siddiqui with Anupam Kher and Kirron Kher, which incidentally became her first acting performance during her comeback after a sabbatical.

In 1992, the play Love Letters by American playwright and novelist A. R. Gurney was adapted to Urdu as Tumhari Amrita and given an Indian context by Javed Siddiqi. It was performed by veteran actors Shabana Azmi and Farooq Sheikh at the Jennifer Kapoor Festival in Prithvi theatre in February 1992 for the first time. For one and a half hours, the actors read the letters describing the relationship between two friends, Amrita and Zulfikar, over a period of 35 years. For the next 21 years until Farooq Sheikh's death in December 2013, this immensely successful play went on to tour many parts of the world, including the US, Europe and Pakistan. The last show was held in the Taj Mahal, Agra.

Khan's production of Peter Shaffer's satirical comedy, The Royal Hunt of the Sun and the contemporary Indian adaptation of Arthur Miller's classic Death of a Salesman, Salesman Ramlal (1997), starring actor-director Satish Kaushik. are important plays of Indian theatre. Salesman Ramlal was revived in 2009, with a more contemporary version.

Next came the English theatre production of Mahatma v/s Gandhi, based on the relationship between Mahatma Gandhi and his son, Harilal Gandhi. In 2007, he made his film debut with Gandhi, My Father, based on his play, Mahatma v/s Gandhi, and opened to critical acclaim. At the National Film Award, actor Darshan Zariwala won the Best Supporting Actor Award, for his role of Gandhi, while the film itself won the Special Jury Award and Best Screenplay and the Best Screenplay Award at the Asia Pacific Screen Awards and nominated for Grand Prix at Tokyo Film Festival.

Also in 2007, he added Abbas as his middle name to avoid confusion with Bollywood actor-director Feroz Khan.

In 2016, he directed Mughal-e-Azam, a Broadway-style musical based on the 1960 Bollywood film Mughal-e-Azam, which was directed by K. Asif and produced by Shapoorji Pallonji. The musical was produced jointly by Shapoorji Pallonji Group and the National Centre for the Performing Arts (India).

In March 2023, Khan planned to open his Civilization to Nation: The Journey of Our Nation in the new 2,000-seat Grand Theatre at Mumbai's Jio World Centre.

== Plays ==
- Raunaq & Jassi
- All the Best
- Eva Mumbai Ma Chaal Jaiye
- Saalgirah – Anupam Kher & Kirron Kher
- The Royal Hunt of the Sun
- Tumhari Amrita (1992) – Shabana Azmi & Farooq Sheikh
- Mahatma vs Gandhi (1998)
- Salesman Ramlal (1999) – Satish Kaushik
- Kuch Bhi Ho Sakta Hai – Anupam Kher
- Dinner With Friends (2011) (Tisca Chopra, Vinay Jain, Joy Sengupta & Perizaad Zorabian Irani)
- Mughal-E-Azam - The Great Indian Musical
- Civilisation To Nation

== Filmography ==
- Gandhi, My Father (2007)
- Dekh Tamasha Dekh (2014)
