= Jamshed Bhabha Theatre =

Theatre in Mumbai, India

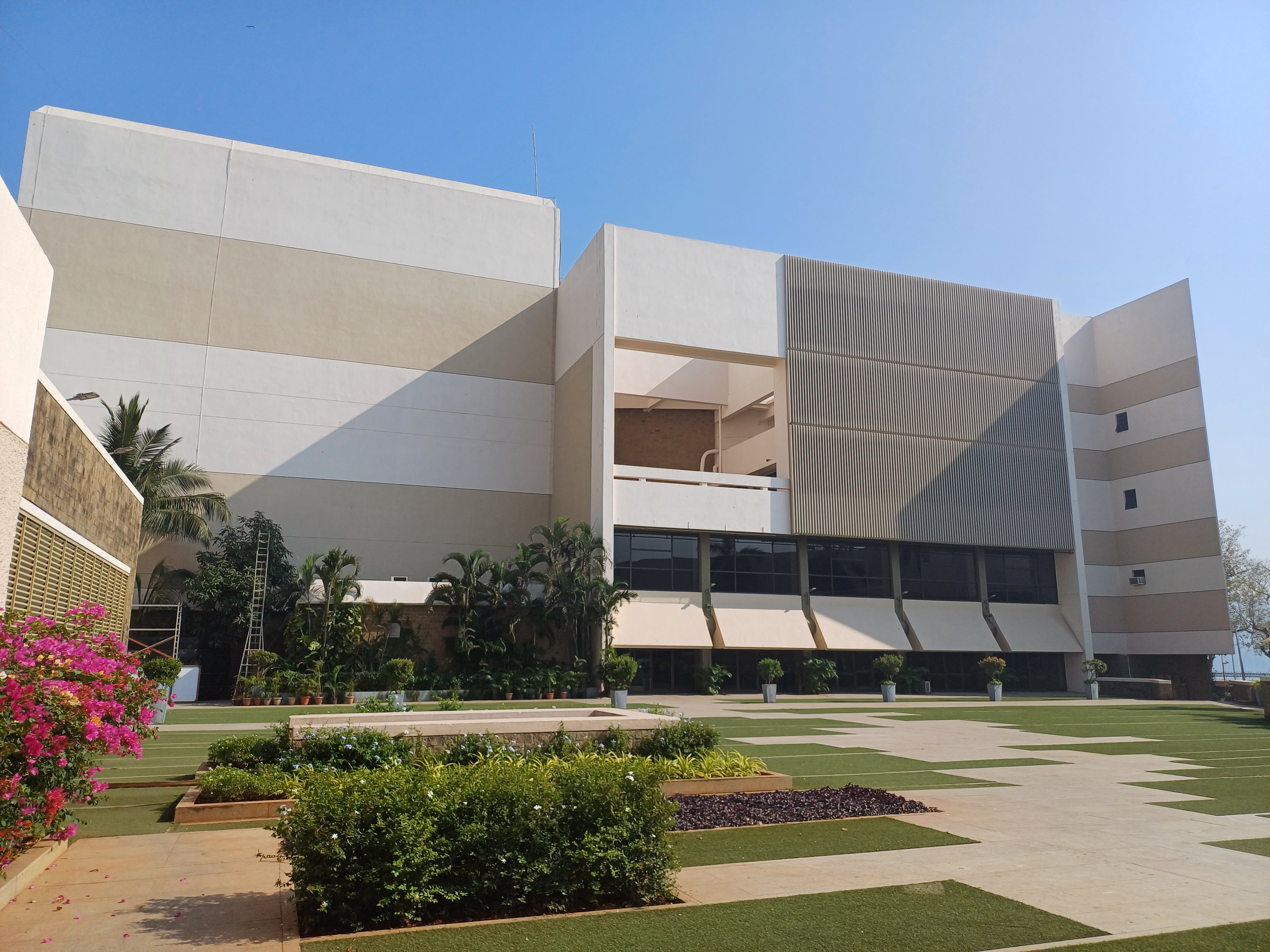
Jamshed Bhabha Theatre at NCPA

The Jamshed Bhabha Theatre is a 1109-seater theatre inaugurated on 24 November 1999 within The National Centre for the Performing Arts premises in Mumbai, India. It was constructed on reclaimed land at Nariman Point, but a fire in December 1997 destroyed the nearly completed structure, prompting a full rebuild completed in two years. The theatre has since become one of India's premier large-format performance venues, hosting landmark productions such as Mughal‑e‑Azam (2016) and The Mirror Crack'd (2019). It features a 1,109-seat proscenium-style auditorium with finely tuned acoustics by Cyril Harris, designed to function without electronic amplification. A 100-year-old Carrara marble staircase from the demolished Petit Hall in Malabar Hill, whcich was donated by Petit family.

== History ==
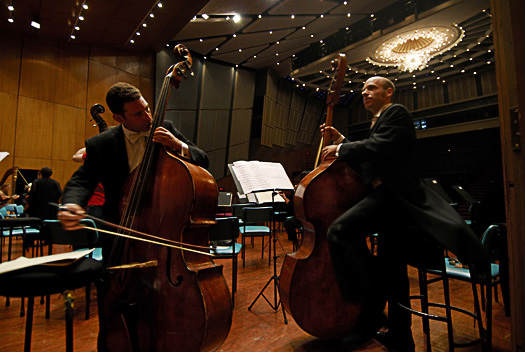
Members of the Israel Philharmonic Orchestra rehearse at the Jamshed Bhabha theater before their performance

The Jamshed Bhabha Theatre (JBT) was proposed by Dr Jamshed J. Bhabha as a venue of the National Centre for the Performing Arts (NCPA) and opened on 24 November 1999. The construction was led by the NCPA Trust for 2 years, which had reclaimed land at Nariman Point for the complex. Two months before its scheduled completion, a major fire accident broke out on 31 December 1997, destroying the nearly finished structure. Jamshed Baba visited the site and insisted on starting the construction again. The theater was constructed from debris within next two years. It was then known as India’s premier large‑format performance space. It was the final and largest auditorium in NCPA’s five‑theatre campus.

In 2016, the theatre hosted the first public shows of Mughal-e-Azam, a Broadway-style musical directed by Feroz Abbas Khan and jointly produced by Shapoorji Pallonji Group and the National Centre for the Performing Arts (India). The musical is based on the 1960 Bollywood film Mughal-e-Azam, directed by K. Asif and produced by Shapoorji Pallonji. In 2019, the theatre produced and premiered the Agatha Christie whodunnit classic, The Mirror Crack'd directed by Melly Still, produced by Pádraig Cusack, in a new version for an Indian audience by Ayeesha Menon, based on the adaptation by Rachel Wagstaff of the novel The Mirror Crack'd from Side to Side, and starring Sonali Kulkarni, Denzil Smith and Shernaz Patel.

== Architecture ==
The Jamshed Bhabha theater was designed as a traditional proscenium‑arch auditorium with modern stagecraft facilities, JBT seats 1,109 patrons in a fan‑shaped configuration to ensure clear sight‑lines and intimate acoustics without electronic amplification. Besides the main auditorium, the theatre has three conference rooms, large foyer spaces and a museum. The acoustics of this theatre were designed by Cyril Harris to permit appreciation of individual instruments without any additional amplification.

The theatre is home to a 100-year-old staircase in its foyer. The staircase was donated to the NCPA by the Petit family. It was originally part of the Petit hall at Malabar Hill, made of Carrara marble shipped from Italy. When the Petit hall was demolished, the staircase was dismantled and stored in a warehouse for forty years until it was re-assembled and added to the theatre's foyer. A new, permanent exhibition located in the foyer of JBT, which opened to the public on 16 May 2018, pays tribute to the life and legacy of Jamshed Bhabha.

== See also ==
- Tata Theatre
- Experimental Theatre (NCPA)
