= Romain Descharmes =

French pianist

- Born: 1980 (age 44–45); Nancy, France
- Genres: Classical
- Occupation(s): Musician, Concert pianist
- Instrument: piano
- Website: Romain Descharmes' Official Website

Romain Descharmes (born March 1980) is a French classical pianist.

== Biography ==
Romain Descharmes was born in Nancy, France. He began piano studies at the Conservatoire régional du Grand Nancy, where he won, at age 14, a gold medal in the Hugues Leclère's class. In 1998, he moved to Paris in the CNR and CNSMDP.

He continued his studies in an improvement cycle after studying in the CNSMDP where he won four first prizes (piano, chamber music, piano accompaniment and vocal accompaniment). He was studying with Jacques Rouvier, Christian Ivaldi, Bruno Rigutto, Jean Koerner and Anne Grappotte. Later, he continued his studies first with Jacques Rouvier and then Bruno Rigutto, during which time he was awarded a scholarship by the Meyer Foundation for cultural and artistic development, and made a recording of works by early twentieth-century composers. For this project he received the advice of Pierre Boulez. He has also taken masterclasses with Dimitri Bashkirov, İdil Biret, John O'Conor and Oxana Yablonskaya.

At the same time, Romain Descharmes is an instructor in the CNR of Paris for chamber music, specially with singers.

Romain Descharmes was awarded First Prize in the Dublin International Piano Competition in 2006, leading him to perform recitals on such prestigious stages as Carnegie Hall in New York, Wigmore Hall in London, National Concert Hall in Dublin, Minato Hall in Yokohama, Tsuda Hall and Hakuju Hall in Tokyo, Salle Cortot and Salle Pleyel in Paris. He has been also awarded prizes at other international competitions (Vlado Perlemuter, Shanghai, Hamamatsu, Alessandro Casagrande), and has received the support of the Yamaha and Natexis Banques Populaires foundations.

In 2004, he became an affiliate of the Charles Cros Academy.

Romain Descharmes has appeared in concert with orchestras in US, England, Ireland, France, Japan and China, most notably with the Midland Symphony Orchestra, the National Symphony Orchestra of Ireland, l'Orchestre de la Garde Républicaine, le Nouvel Ensemble Instrumental du Conservatoire de Paris, l'Orchestre de Paris, l'Orchestra del Lazio and the Shanghai Philharmonic Orchestra.

He used to perform recitals in France (Festival de La Roque-d'Anthéron, Piano aux Jacobins, Rencontres Internationales Frederic Chopin, Serres d'Auteuil, Nancyphonies, Ars Terra, Aix-en-Provence, Saint Jean-de-Luz, Estivales de Musique au Coeur du Médoc, Agora Festival) and abroad (Festival Arties in India, Beirut, Leipzig, Naples, Lisbon Opera, and Festival Cervantino in Mexico).

Romain Descharmes has also participated in numerous broadcasts for television and radio (France Musique, Mezzo TV, NHK Japan).

He is also much sought after as a chamber musician. He is renowned for his attentive, sensitive playing and wide repertoire, which ranges from sonatas to larger ensemble pieces, as well as lieder, of which he is particularly fond. He has collaborated with such artists as Roland Daugareil, Henri Demarquette, Laurent Korcia, Sarah Nemtanu, the Court-Circuit Ensemble, the Ebène Philarmoniker Quintette.

He recorded several CDs for piano (Ravel -Audite, Brahms -Claudio Records) and chamber music (Naïve, Cristal, Saphir).

In 2012, he performed the Piano Concerto No. 2 (Camille Saint-Saëns) with the Orchestre de Paris and Alain Altinoglu as conductor. Reviews manifested that Romain Descharmes is one of the best current French pianist.

Since 2010, he has been playing piano with the Quai n°5 brand (Stéphane Logerot, Jean-Marc Phillips Varjabedian, François Desforges et Jean-Luc Manca). They recorded their first CD in 2010.

From 9 to 15 March 2013, he was invited in the Experimental Theatre of the National Centre for the Performing Arts (NCPA) in Mumbai, India.

== Discography ==
- Johannes Brahms, Sonata No.3 in F minor, Op.5; Sechs Klavierstucke, Op.118 Claudio Records (2008)
- Maurice Ravel, Valses nobles et sentimentales; Gaspard de la Nuit; Sonatine; La Valse Audite (2009)
- Johannes Brahms, trio Op.114; Béla Bartók, Contrastes; Aram Khachaturian, Trio with Florent Pujuila (clarinet), Deborah Nemtanu (violin) and Yovan Markovitch (cello) Saphir Productions
- Quai N°5, Quai n°5 DECCA (2010)
- Camille Saint-Saëns, Complete Piano Concertos 1-5 and other works for piano and orchestra with the Malmö Symphony Orchestra conducted by Marc Soustrot (Naxos 2017)

== Notes and references ==
5 ^ http://www.claudiorecords.com/detail/cr5786-6_descharmes.html
