= Mughal-e-Azam (musical) =

2016 Indian musical directed by Feroz Abbas Khan

Mughal-e-Azam (transl. The Great Mughal) is a Broadway-style musical based on the 1960 Bollywood film of the same name, directed by K. Asif and produced by Shapoorji Pallonji. The musical was directed by Feroz Abbas Khan and produced by Shapoorji Pallonji Group.

Based on the love story between Mughal Prince Salim and courtesan Anarkali, Mughal-e-Azam portrays the conflict faced by Mughal Emperor Akbar: his responsibility towards the future of his empire and his duty as the father of a beloved son.

It was the first large-scale Indian Broadway-style musical, and was in production for ten months. The show was well received by critics in the media and entertainment industry. In 2017, it won seven out of the fourteen BroadwayWorld India Awards including Best Play, Best Director, and Best Costume Design.

== Plot ==
In the era of the Mughals, Emperor Akbar's desire of a son is fulfilled when his wife, Jodhabai, gives birth to Salim, who grows up to be a spoiled brat filled with disrespect and self-indulgence. Consequently, he's sent off to war in Akbar's army and returns as a reformed person with perseverance and discipline fourteen years later. Salim, now a young man, falls in love with Anarkali, a lowly courtesan. Bahar, a dancer who covets the love of the Prince, is filled with jealousy upon discovering the secret affair and exposes it to Akbar. The emperor, full of royal pride, vehemently disapproves of the relationship and imprisons Anarkali, which leads Salim to declare an open rebellion against him. The war between father and son changes the lives of everyone in the empire threatening the foundations of the Mughal rule in India.

== Background ==
The 1960 K. Asif film was inspired by a play called Anarkali, written in Lahore in 1922 by dramatist Imtiaz Ali Taj. Feroz Abbas Khan had wanted to recreate the film onstage since he saw the black-and-white film re-released in colour in 2004. In a 2017 interview, Khan said he hadn't wanted to do an imitation of Asif's Mughal-e-Azam, but rather "pay a tribute to K. Asif sahab". For him, the play was “an interpretation; carrying the legacy forward in a different medium.” Prior to Mughal-e-Azam, Khan was known for minimalistic productions like Tumhari Amrita, and as a director, he wanted to do something entirely different. Inspired by Mughal-e-Azam, he approached Shapoorji Pallonji Group to get the stage rights. The current CEO and director of Shapoorji Pallonji Group, Deepesh Salgia, agreed on the condition that the play kept up the tradition of the film and provided creative consultancy for the production.

According to Salgia, after the colourisation of the original black-and-white movie, the company was looking for new ways to promote the film. The musical retained Naushad’s soundtrack and Shakeel Badayuni’s lyrics from the original film, along with two newly composed songs. The songs are sung live by the singers on stage to a pre-recorded orchestral and choral score. The play is in both the Urdu and Hindi languages, with LED screens displaying English subtitles of the dialogue.

== Production ==
The technical team included Drama Desk Award-winning light designer David Lander; Emmy-nominated John Narun for projection design, who has previously worked on Madonna’s concerts and productions at Radio City Music Hall in New York; and production designer Neil Patel, a recipient of the Obie Award and Helen Hayes Award, who recreated the design of Emperor Akbar's Sheesh Mahal (mirror hall) on set. Bollywood designer Manish Malhotra designed over 550 costumes and choreographer Mayuri Upadhya recreated the dance sequences from the film for the play.

== Cast ==
Mughal-e-Azam recruited a cast and crew of over 350 people, including 30 classically trained Kathak dancers who had been living and training in Mumbai for three months. Since the lead actresses had to both sing and dance simultaneously, two actresses — Neha Sargam and Priyanka Barve — played the part of Anarkali alternatively. Theatre actors Nissar Khan, Syed Shahab Ali, and Dhanveer Singh played the parts of Akbar and Salim respectively. For special show in Singapore Theatre actor Harsh Jha essayed the role of Salim The part of Jodha Bai was played by Sonal Jha. Yudhvir Ahlawat played the part of Young Salim. Rajesh jais & Tareeq Ahmed Khan played part of Sangtarash/Narrator, and Palvi Jaswal essayed the role of Suraiya. Durjan Singh was portrayed by Chirag Garg and Amit Pathak alternatively. Meanwhile the role of Bahar was played by Aashima Mahajan and Rupsha Mukherjee.

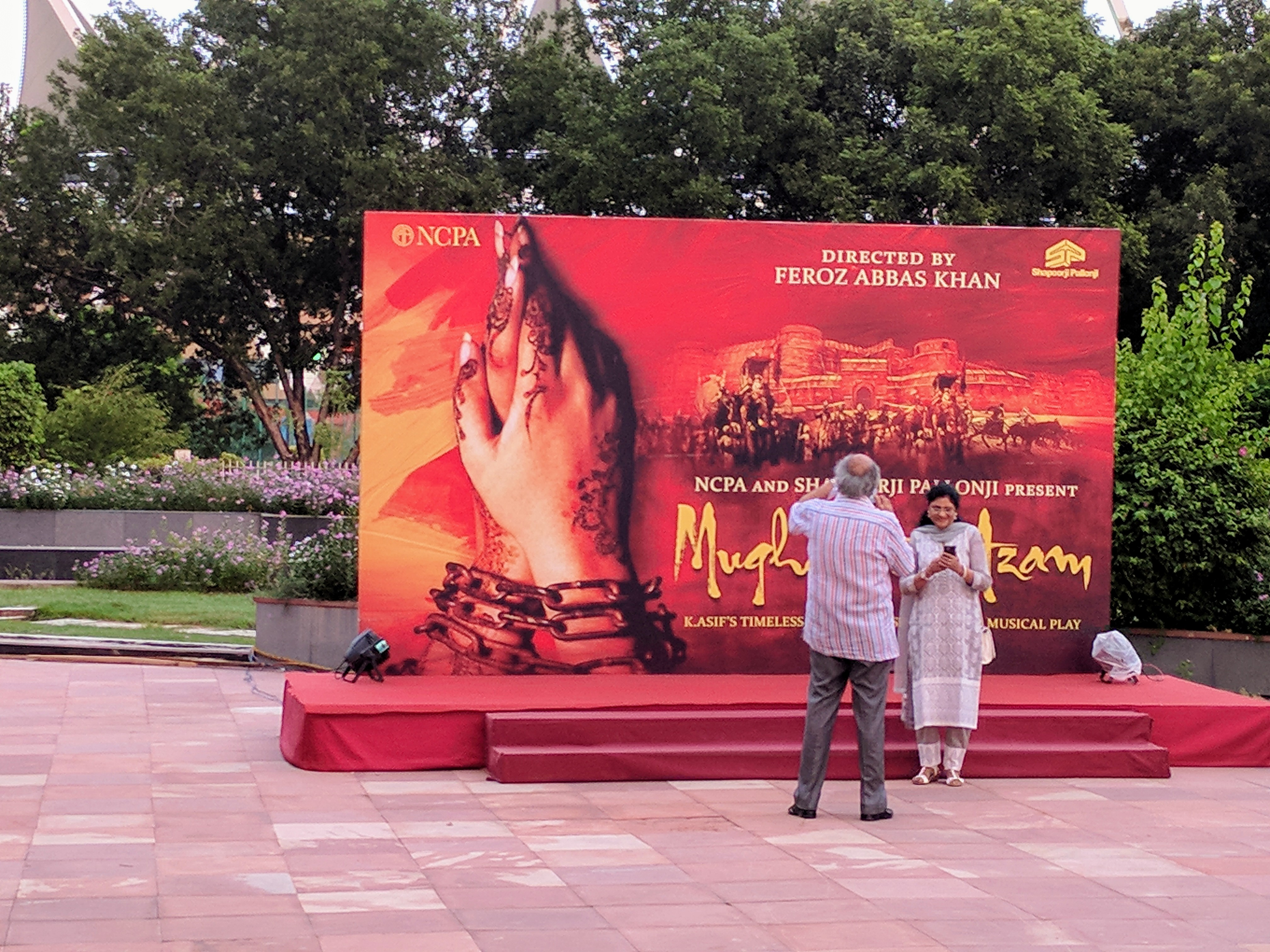
:Mughal e Azam Musical in Delhi in Sept 2017

== Reception ==
The premiere public shows of the musical were held at the Jamshed Bhabha Theatre. The musical had 57 shows in Mumbai, and one successful season in Delhi. The premiere of the musical in Delhi was attended by Union Finance Minister Arun Jaitley, Information and Broadcasting and Textiles Minister Smriti Irani, Nitin Gadkari, and Jyotiraditya Scindia. Bollywood actresses Rekha and Hema Malini, and directors Karan Johar, Ashutosh Gowariker, and Gurinder Chadha attended the last show of the musical at the Jamshed Bhabha Theatre in Mumbai. In her review of the Broadway-style musical, Eshita Bhargava of the Indian Express called it “an audio-visual extravaganza that will be a joy to behold”. Rishi Kapoor, a Bollywood actor and the grandson of actor Prithviraj Kapoor who played the role of Mughal emperor Akbar in the original film, tweeted “I don't have enough of adjectives to describe it. This will play forever.” Karan Johar, Bollywood director and actor, tweeted “Mughal-e-Azam, the musical play, was a spectacular throwback to the legendary film; the team and director Feroz Khan have excelled themselves.” The Quint called it “Indian theatre’s coming of age”, “succeeding in giving the audience its own, new set of timeless memories”. In her theatre review of The Times of India, Purvaja Sawant stated “the live performances of 'Mughal-e-Azam's hit songs transport you back to a nostalgic era, one you don't want to come out of.”

== Awards ==
Mughal-e-Azam: The Musical won seven trophies, including the Best Indian Play, at the Broadway World India Awards 2017.

BroadwayWorld India Awards	Winner
Best Play	Mughal-e-Azam
Best Ensemble Cast	Mughal-e-Azam
Best Direction of a Play	Feroz Abbas Khan
Best Original Choreography	Mayuri Upadhyay
Best Original Costume Design	Manish Malhotra
Best Original Lighting Design	David Lander
Best Original Set Design	Neil Patel
