= Love Letters (play) =

1988 play by A. R. Gurney

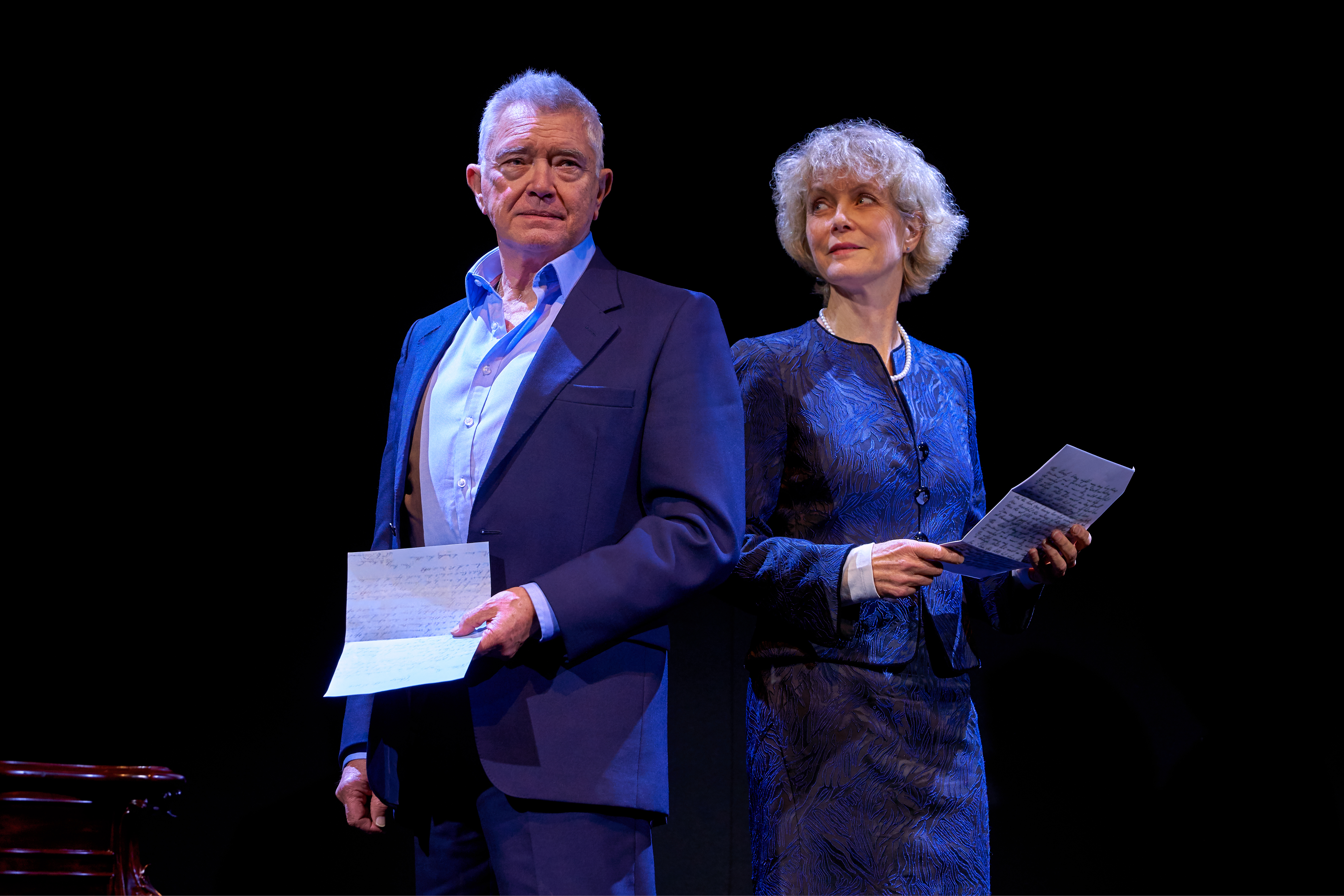
- Martin Shaw and Jenny Seagrove from the 2020 production
- Original language: English
- Written by: A. R. Gurney
- Characters: Melissa Gardner; Andrew Makepeace Ladd III

Premiere
- Date: 1988
- Place: New York Public Library; New York City

Love Letters is a play by A. R. Gurney that was a finalist for the Pulitzer Prize for Drama. The play centers on two characters, Melissa Gardner and Andrew Makepeace Ladd III. Using the epistolary form sometimes found in novels, they sit side by side at tables and read the notes, letters and cards – in which over nearly 50 years, they discuss their hopes and ambitions, dreams and disappointments, victories and defeats – that have passed between them throughout their separated lives.

The play is a performance favorite for busy name actors, for it requires little preparation, and lines need not be memorized. It was first performed by the playwright himself with Holland Taylor at the New York Public Library, then opened in 1988 at the Long Wharf Theatre in New Haven, Connecticut, with Joanna Gleason and John Rubinstein.

== Broadway and Off-Broadway productions ==
Directed by John Tillinger, it opened with Kathleen Turner and John Rubinstein on March 27, 1989, at the off-Broadway Promenade Theatre, where it ran for 64 performances. The play was performed only on Sunday and Monday evenings and changed its cast weekly. Among those who appeared in it were Barbara Barrie, Philip Bosco, Bruce Davison, Victor Garber, Julie Harris, George Grizzard, Anthony Heald, George Hearn, Richard Kiley, Dana Ivey, William Hurt, Marsha Mason, Christopher Reeve, Holland Taylor, George Segal, Christopher Walken, Joan Van Ark, Treat Williams, Frances Sternhagen, Hank Offinger, Rebecca Cole, Meredith Baxter, Michael Gross and Nancy Blaine.

On October 31 that same year, a Broadway production opened at the Edison Theatre, where it ran for 96 performances. It opened with Colleen Dewhurst and Jason Robards. Other performers paired in the Broadway production included Lynn Redgrave and John Clark, Stockard Channing and John Rubinstein, Jane Curtin and Edward Herrmann, Kate Nelligan and David Dukes, Polly Bergen and Robert Vaughn, Timothy Hutton and Elizabeth McGovern, Swoosie Kurtz and Richard Thomas, Elaine Stritch and Cliff Robertson, Nancy Marchand and Fritz Weaver, and Robert Foxworth and Elizabeth Montgomery.

The play returned to Broadway on September 13, 2014, to the Brooks Atkinson Theater in limited engagements with rotating casts. The first cast starred Brian Dennehy and Mia Farrow, followed by Carol Burnett with Dennehy, and Alan Alda and Candice Bergen; scheduled next were Anjelica Huston, Stacy Keach, Diana Rigg and Martin Sheen. This production closed early, after six previews and 95 performances, ending with the cast of Alan Alda and Candice Bergen on December 14, 2014.

In 2023, Irish Repertory Theatre, an Off Broadway company in Chelsea revived the play with a rotating cast including Talia Balsam, Laura Benanti, Matthew Broderick, Victor Garber, Brooke Shields, John Slattery and J. Smith-Cameron.

== Adaptations ==
In 1992, the play was adapted to Urdu and an Indian context by playwright Javed Siddiqui, as Tumhari Amrita and performed by veteran Indian actors Shabana Azmi and Farooq Sheikh, under the direction of Feroz Abbas Khan. It later toured to many parts of the world, including the US, Europe, and Pakistan.

In 1993, episode 518 of Mystery Science Theater 3000 satirized the play, condensing it to about a minute with dialog such as "Dear Melissa, I turned middle-aged this week. I'm a rich WASP and I love you."

In 1999, Gurney adapted Love Letters for a television film, directed by Stanley Donen, that dramatized scenes and portrayed characters merely described in the play. Laura Linney and Steven Weber starred.

On November 13, 2017, a Russian performance of the play was held in Moscow (the stage of the Malaya Bronnaya Theater) by the Atelier Theater, directed by Dainius Kazlauskas and starring Ekaterina Klimova and Gosha Kutsenko.
