= New Empire Cinema (Mumbai) =

Cinema hall in Mumbai, India

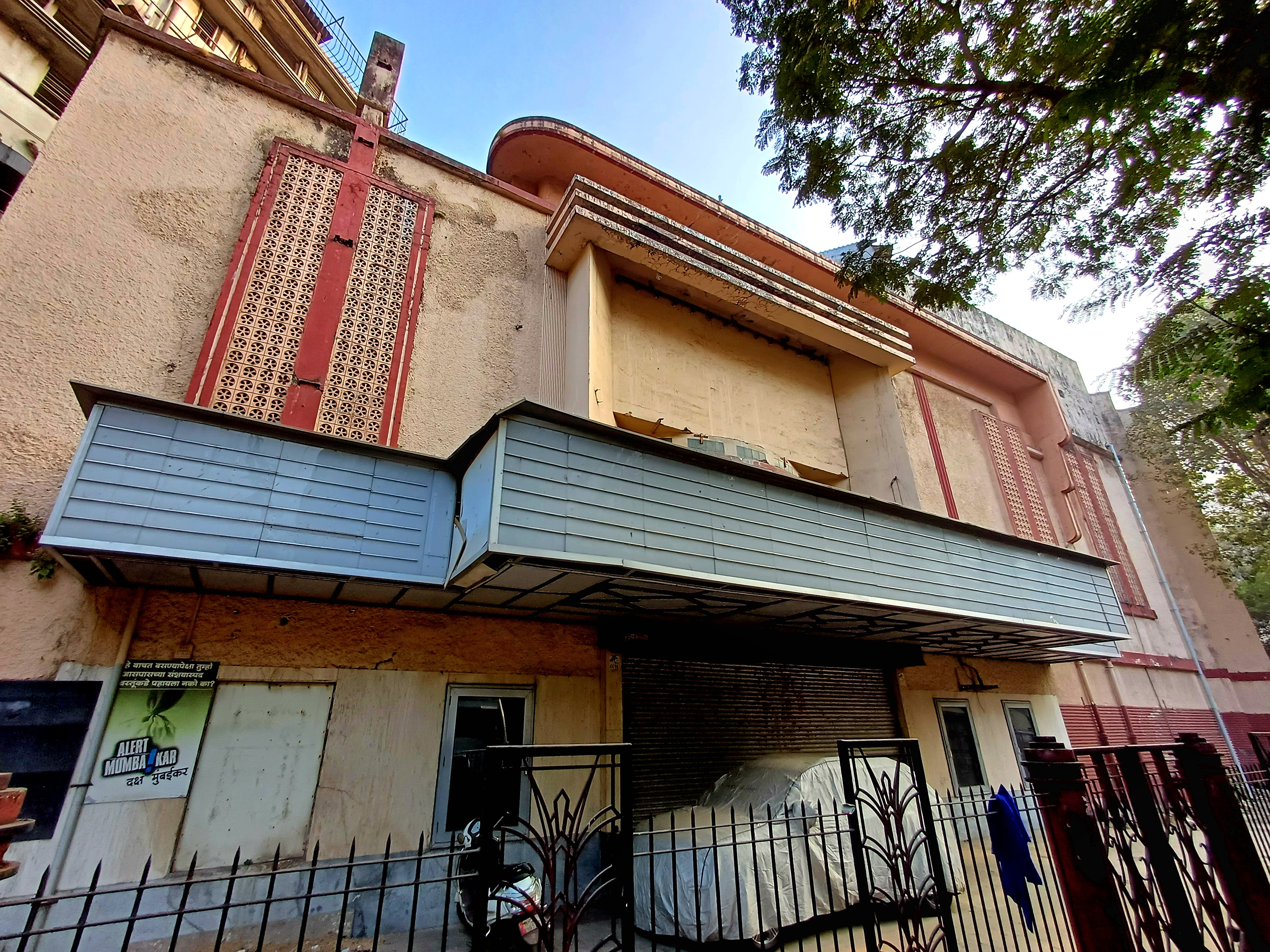
- Façade of New Empire Cinema in 2024
- Interactive map of New Empire Cinema
- Former names: The Empire Theatre
- Location: Fort, Mumbai, India
- Owner: Burge Cooper
- Type: Cinema Hall
- Public transit: Chhatrapati Shivaji Terminus

Construction
- Opened: 1908; 118 years ago
- Closed: 2014; 12 years ago
- Architect: Arthur Payne

New Empire was a cinema hall in South Mumbai located in close proximity to the Chhatrapati Shivaji Terminus. It closed down on 21 March 2014 after being in existence for over a century due to persistent losses suffered by the owners.

== History ==
New Empire originally opened in 1908 as a live theatre and hosted plays. It was then known as the Empire Theatre. In 1948, it was completely overhauled by British architect M.A. Riddley Abbott and reopened as New Empire with a seating capacity of nearly a thousand. The New Empire Cinema was taken over by 20th Century Fox Corp. in 1955 and was the Bombay showcase cinema for their films.

New Empire was one of the oldest single-screen cinema halls in Mumbai and the first in Asia to have a cantilevered balcony. Similar cinema halls that were built in the Art Deco style and opened subsequently in the south Mumbai area were Regal (opened in 1933), Metro (opened in 1938) and Liberty (opened in 1949). The first film it screened was in 1930 – the talkie Vagabond King.

== Ownership ==
It was originally owned by the Bombay Improvement Trust, which used to carry out civic works in the city. The theatre was bought by Mr. Keki Mody in 1935 who is the father-in-law of the current owner Mr. Burge Cooper.

== Architectural style ==
Empire Theatre was built as an elaborate Victorian structure. It was made in the Baroque style by architect Arthur Payne with the interiors done by O’Connor and Gerard. In 1948, it underwent a complete overhaul and was rebuilt in the then-prevalent Art Deco style of architecture.

== Current state ==
New Empire suffered major losses owing to stiff competition from multiplexes. Another reason for the losses was the steep entertainment tax of 45 percent imposed by the Maharashtra government from which the multiplexes were exempt. The cinema suffered losses every month for 7 years with an accumulated loss of nearly Rs. 26 million. It closed its operations on 21 March 2014.
