= Tata Theatre =

Theatre in Mumbai, India

- Interactive map of Tata Theatre
- Address: Tata Theatre, NCPA Marg, Nariman Point; Mumbai, Maharashtra; India
- Coordinates: 18.92541°N 72.81916°E
- Owner: National Centre for the Performing Arts (India)
- Capacity: 1,010
- Type: Theatre

Construction
- Opened: 11 October 1980
- Architect: Philip Johnson

Website
- www.ncpamumbai.com/venue/tata-theatre/

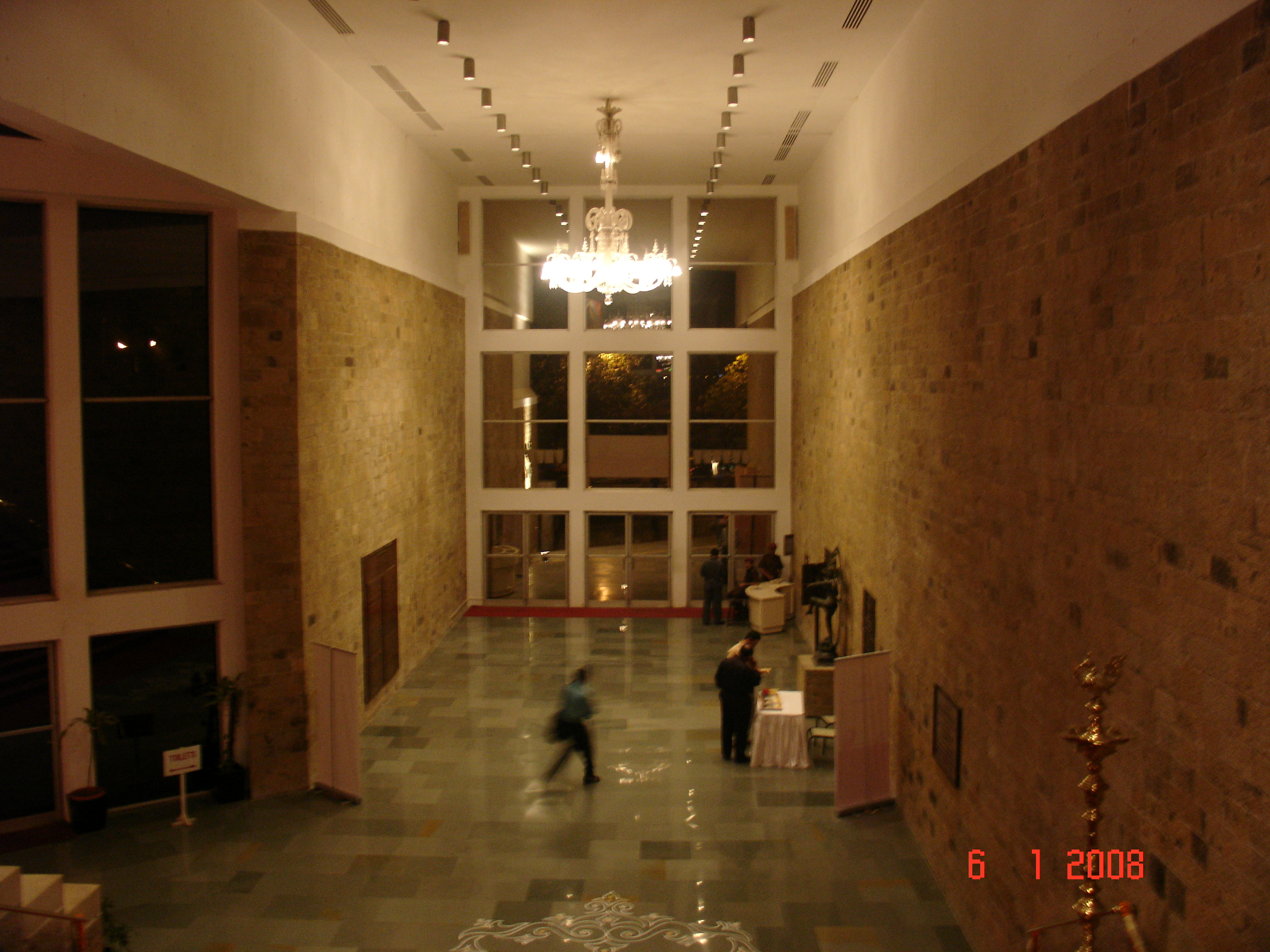
Foyer of the Tata Theatre

The Tata Theatre is a 1010-seat premier staging facility for music, dance and drama at The National Centre for the Performing Arts complex in the city of Mumbai, India. It is India’s first theatre designed and built keeping in mind the unique acoustic and visual requirements for the staging of Indian music, dance and related art forms, and was constructed by Larsen & Toubro Limited. The theatre was inaugurated by the then Prime Minister of India, Indira Gandhi on the 11 of October 1980.

Keeping in mind the traditional seating requirements at Indian classical musical concerts and performances, the Tata Theatre stage is built in the almost semi-circular thrust shape. The alternate concave and convex triangular forms on the overhead and the wall panelings ensure even distribution of acoustics over the entire auditorium. The acoustic forms of high-density compressed plaster were handmade and lifted manually up into their positions. The architects ensured that every musical instrument played in the orchestra could individually be heard and appreciated in every corner of the auditorium.

The external structure of the Tata Theatre complex has been acoustically insulated from outside interference such as road traffic and sounds from construction and maintenance activities by separate pile foundations down to the rock base.

Famous artistes who have performed at the Tata Theatre over the years include Yehudi Menuhin, Ustad Vilayat Khan and M S Subbalaxmi. The Tata Theatre has also been utilized for special cultural programmes for India’s state guests and visiting dignitaries. Its spacious foyers are also used for special exhibitions.

== See also ==
- NCPA
- Jamshed Bhabha Theatre
- Experimental Theatre (NCPA)
