= Experimental Theatre (NCPA) =

Coordinates: 18.9252°N 72.8199°E

Experimental Theatre, National Centre for the Performing Arts
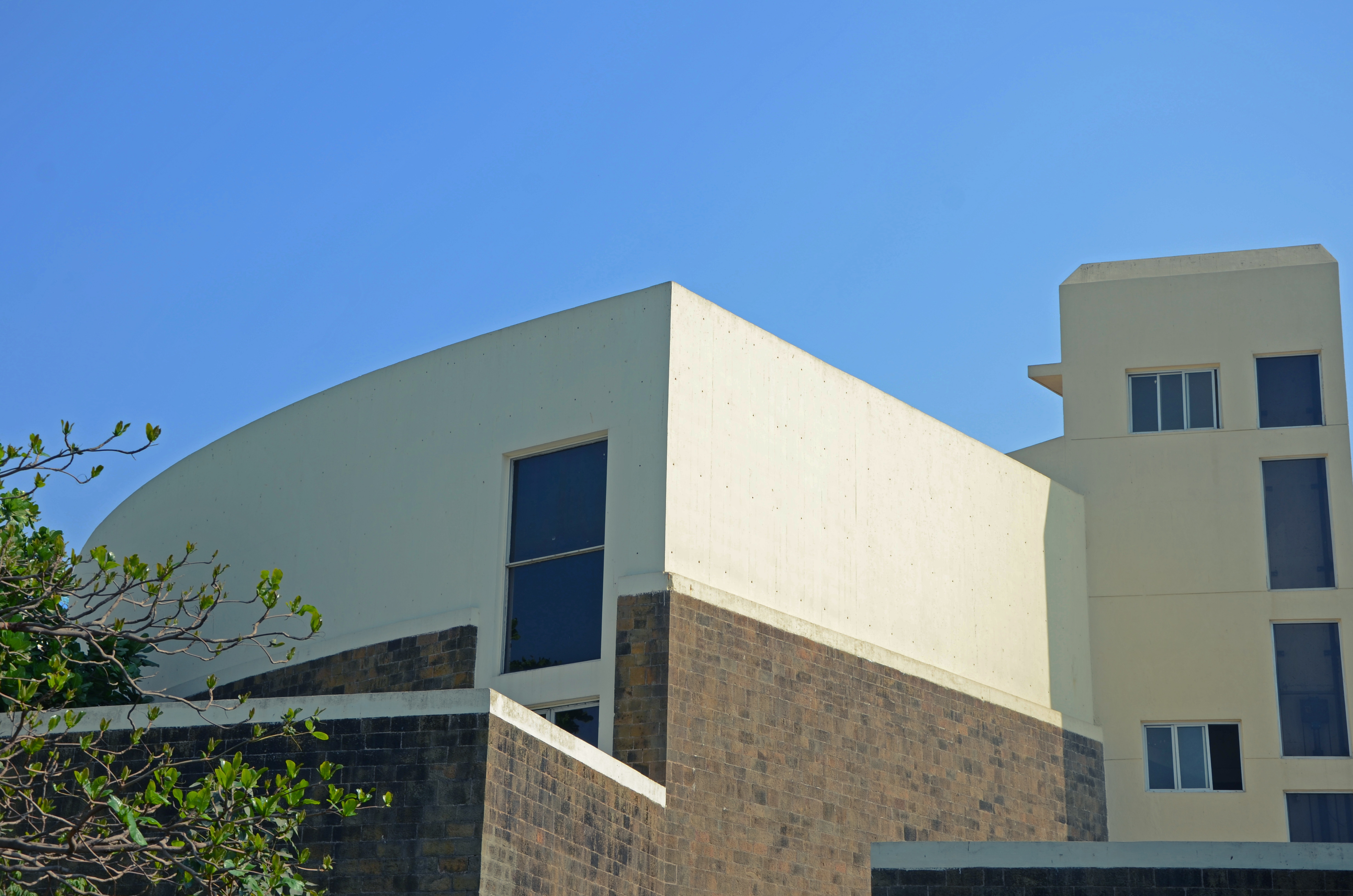
- Interactive map of the Experimental Theatre, National Centre for the Performing Arts area

General information
- Type: Arts complex
- Location: Mumbai, India
- Construction started: 1981
- Completed: 1985
- Opened: 25 April 1986

Height
- Height: 46.28m

Design and construction
- Architect: Philip Johnson
- Main contractor: Larsen & Toubro Limited

The Experimental Theatre is a 300-seat theatre at the National Centre for the Performing Arts in Mumbai, India. It was inaugurated in April 1986 as a black box theatre venue with modular seating and staging units.

== History ==
The NCPA was constructed in the 1980s. After the Tata Theatre was constructed, work began on the Experimental Theatre, a versatile black box theatre space which small-scale groups to perform flexible works at the centre. Tata Steel (formerly Tata Iron & Steel Company) made an initial donation to the Theatre of 5 million rupees. The Theatre was officially inaugurated on 25 April 1986.

== Facilities ==
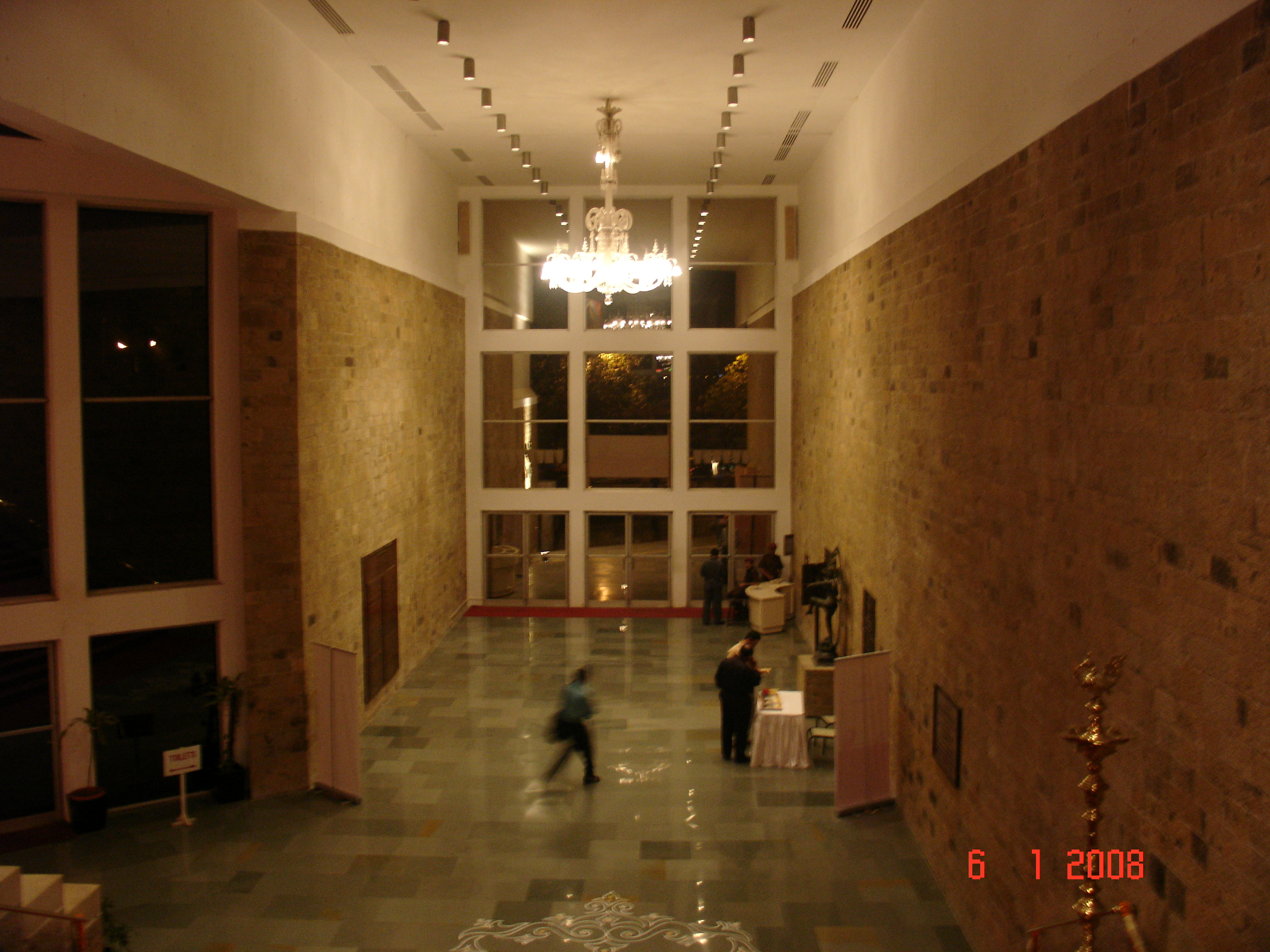
Tata Theatre foyer entrance to the Experimental Theatre

Besides the theatre itself, the Experimental Theatre includes three conference rooms, large foyer spaces and a museum.

According to the Larsen & Toubro the acoustics of this theatre allow individual instruments to be appreciated without amplification.

== Performances ==
The Experimental Theatre has hosted experimental plays, Indian epics, classical music concerts, and Western operas and ballets. Famous artists such as Romain Descharmes have performed there.

== See also ==
- NCPA
- Tata Theatre
- Jamshed Bhabha Theatre
