= Tumhari Amrita =

Play written by Javed Siddiqui

- Written by: Javed Siddiqui (Indian adaptation)
- Characters: Amrita & Zulfi

Premiere
- Date: February 27, 1992
- Place: Prithvi Theatre, Mumbai

Tumhari Amrita is an epistolary play directed by Feroz Abbas Khan. Its original cast includes Shabana Azmi and Farooq Sheikh. It is an Indian context adaptation of A. R. Gurney's American play, Love Letters (1988), and the Hindi/Urdu version was created in 1992 by playwright Javed Siddiqui. After its première at Prithvi Theatre, Mumbai on 27 February 1992, it has been staged at venues across India, Europe, Middle East, US and Pakistan.

The story of unrequited love is read out through reams of love letters between Amrita Nigam and Zulfikar Haider, exchanged over 35 years, starting with Amrita's eighth birthday party in the 1940s, when she first wrote to the ten-year-old Zulfi.

== Development ==
Following productions of The Royal Hunt of the Sun (1991), All the Best, and Eva Mumbai Ma Chaal Jaiye Feroz Abbas Khan read Pulitzer Prize-nominated Love Letters, (1988) by A. R. Gurney. In 1991 Feroz met Gurney in Mumbai, and the producer started working on the play. Feroz approached playwright and screenwriter Javed Siddiqui to work on script. Siddiqui in turn also liked the play and wrote it as a new play, set in Indian context to be produced under the banner of Javed Siddiqui Productions. Shabana Azmi and Farooq Sheikh agreed to play the leads. The central character of Amrita is based on bohemian Indian painter Amrita Sher-Gil (1913–1941).

== Staging history ==
Tumhari Amrita made its début at the Jennifer Kapoor Festival held at Prithvi Theatre, Mumbai on 27 February 1992, under the direction of Feroz Abbas Khan, as tribute to Jennifer Kapoor on her birthday.

As per the direction, the actors do not memorize the script but read out the letters kept on their writing desks throughout the performance. The play lasts 1 hour and 30 minutes. Director Feroz Khan was initially apprehensive about its popularity, feeling that the work was experimental for mass audiences. Its stupendous success came as a surprise to the creative team as well. Tumhari Amrita has since toured the world, including US, Europe and Pakistan, performing over 300 shows and acquired a cult status.

The February 2006 shows, in Karachi and Islamabad in Pakistan, were performed to raise money for earthquake victims. In a 2009 interview, Shabana Azmi said, "Amrita is the character I've enjoyed playing the most in my entire career." The play returned to Prithvi Theatre in November 2010 during the eight-day festival of 'Jana Natya Manch' (Janam), a theatre company set up by Safdar Hashmi. The play celebrated its 20-year anniversary with a full house performance at Bandra Fort in Mumbai. The last staging of this show was in the quadrangle of the historic Taj Mahal in Agra on 14 December 2013. It was the first time a performance was held in the quadrangle of the historic monument to love. The performance received a warm standing ovation.

== Reception ==
After its 2006 performance in Pakistan, leading daily Dawn, ran a headline, "Shabana, Farooque Enthral Audience", while another Daily Times feature on the play said "From India with Love".

== Legacy ==
After the success of Tumhari Amrita, the sequel Aapki Soniya, also written by Javed Siddiqui, had its premiere at Prithvi Theatre, Juhu, on September 28, 2004. It was directed by Salim Arif and lead roles performed by Sonali Bendre and Farooq Sheikh.

The play was also adapted in Marathi language, in 1998, as Prempatra (Love Letter) and was directed by Waman Kendre with Neena Kulkarni playing the lead role.
