= Rampur Samastipur =

Rampur
- Village
- Location within Bihar
- Coordinates: 25.56159°N 85.52446°E
- Country: India
- State: Bihar
- District: Samastipur district

Languages
  - Locally Spoken: Maithili, Hindi
- Time zone: UTC+5:30 (IST)

Rampur is a small yet prosperous and economically developing village in the Samastipur district in the Indian state of Bihar.

== Agriculture ==
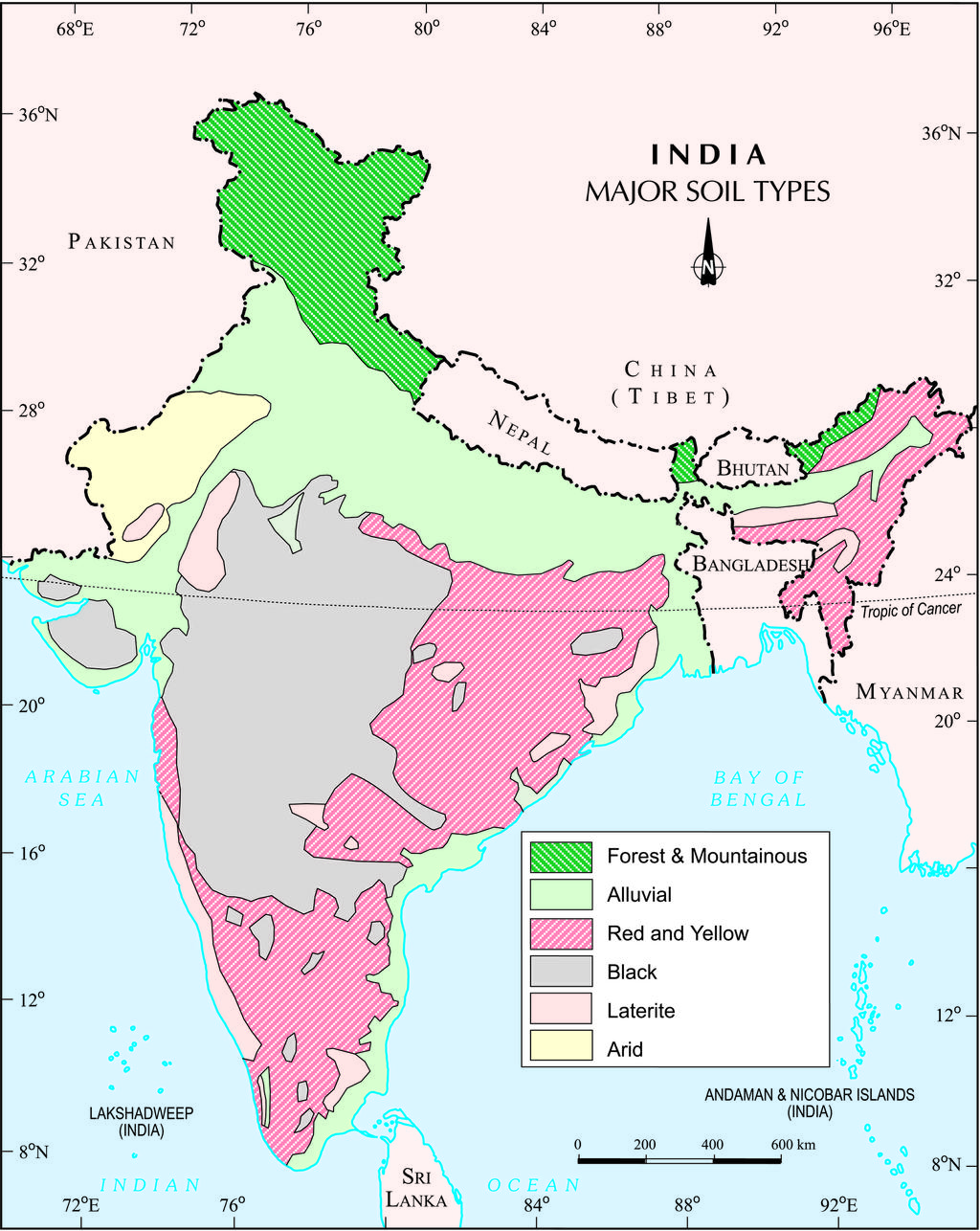
The alluvial soil is highlighted in the map in light green colour

=== Soil type ===
The type of soil found here is the fertile alluvial soil which covers the entire northern plain. Alluvial soils as a whole are very fertile. Mostly these soils contain adequate proportion of potash, phosphoric acid and lime which are ideal for the growth of sugarcane, paddy, wheat and other cereal and pulse crops. Due to its high fertility, regions of alluvial soils such as Rampur are intensively cultivated and densely populated.

=== Crops ===
Tobacco is the main commercial crop grown here. The farming of tobacco is the main source of income for many of the households in the village.

== Economy ==
Dairy farming, poultry, pisciculture and apiculture are the major economic activities.

== Connectivity ==
=== By railway ===
The nearest station to the village is the Kishanpur Railway Station, about 5 km from this station.

=== By road ===
Unlike other villages in the area, Rampur has very good road connectivity.

=== By air ===
The Patna International Airport also known as Jaiprakash Narayan Airport is the nearest airport to the village. Darbhanga Airport only 40km.

== Culture ==
=== Language ===
The major language spoken by the people of the village is Urdu and Maithili.

=== Religion ===
Hindu and Muslim both are living here.

== Festivals ==
Chathh puja

== Education ==
- Madrasa Zeya-Ul-Uloom- an Islamic School, established in 1949 by the Islamic Scholars of Rampur.

== Wild life ==
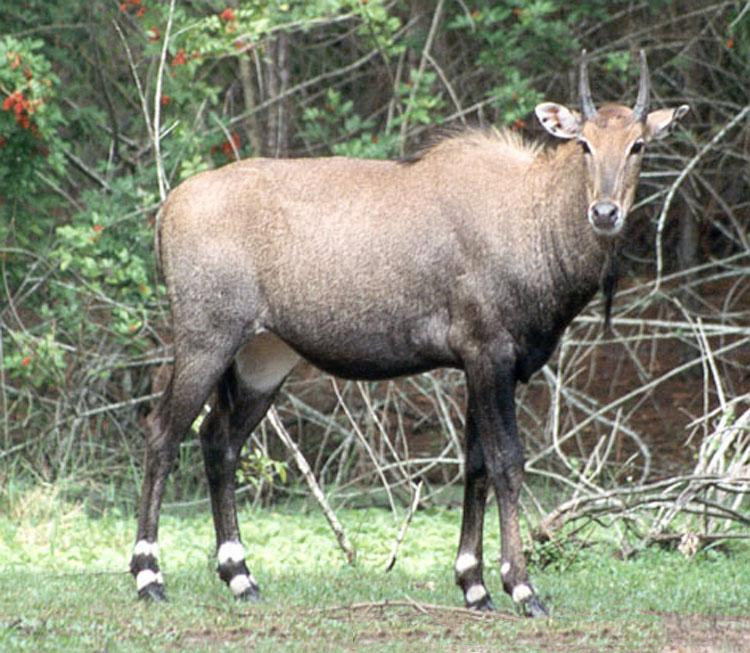
A male Nilgai

Herds of Nilgai,- the largest Asian antelope can be seen in the outskirts of the village. Nilgai are a crop menace, causing large-scale damages, to the crops. They can be legally hunted.
