= National Centre for the Performing Arts (India) =

Arts complex in Mumbai, India

The National Centre for the Performing Arts
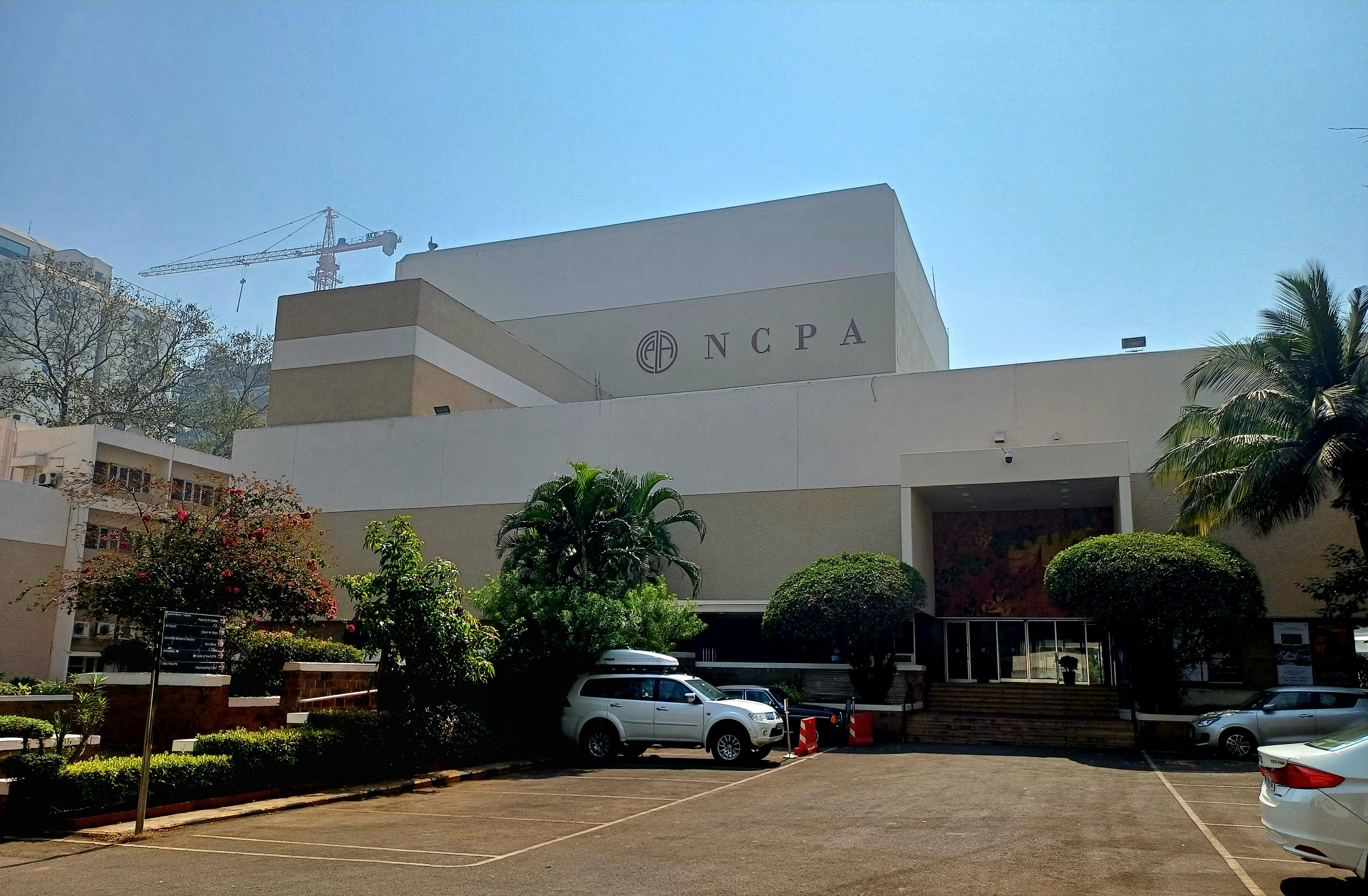

- Location within Mumbai

General information
- Type: Arts, Complex
- Architectural style: International Style
- Location: Mumbai, India, NCPA Marg, Nariman Point
- Coordinates: 18.9251°N 72.8206°E
- Construction started: 1981
- Completed: 1985
- Opened: 1986

Height
- Height: 46.28m

Technical details
- Structural system: Concrete Frame

Design and construction
- Architects: Philip Johnson-concept part; Principal architect Rustom Patell of Patell Batliwala & Associates
- Main contractor: Larsen & Toubro Limited

Website
- www.ncpamumbai.com

The National Centre for the Performing Arts (NCPA) is a multi-venue, multi-purpose cultural centre in Mumbai, India, which aims to promote and preserve India's heritage of music, dance, theatre, film, literature and photography. It also offers training in Indian classical music through a teacher-in-residence, Western classical music and dance. It also presents new and innovative work in the performing arts field.

The centre was founded in 1969 by J. R. D. Tata and Dr. Jamshed Bhabha, brother of nuclear physicist Homi Jehangir Bhabha.

The NCPA is also the home of the Symphony Orchestra of India, which was established by NCPA in 2006. In 2010 the orchestra performed Beethoven's 9th Symphony in Moscow at the 5th World Symphony Orchestra Festival - the first time an orchestra from India had performed there.

On 29 December 2018 NCPA entered its golden jubilee year. It is to undergo renovations to improve the acoustics and overall experience in 2019.

== History ==
The NCPA was registered as a public trust in June 1966 as the 'National Institute of Performing Arts' and the current name was adopted in November 1967. It was inaugurated by the then Prime Minister of India Mrs. Indira Gandhi on 29 December 1969 with the performance being held at a rented premise courtesy of the Bhulabhai and Dhirajl Desai Memorial Trust. The first recording of the institute was with tabla maestro Ahmed Jan Thirakwa.

Work on the center as it stands today at the tip of Nariman Point, in South Mumbai, began in 1973 on reclaimed land.

== Objectives ==
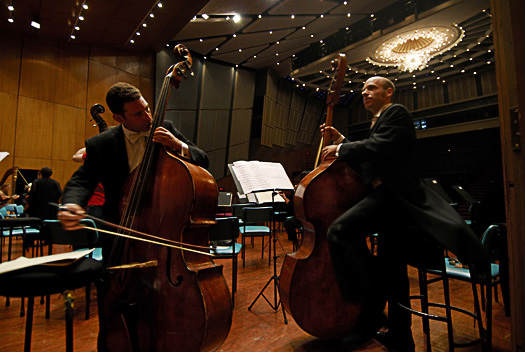
Members of the Israel Philharmonic Orchestra rehearse at the Jamshed Bhabha theatre, NCPA before their performance

- To establish a national centre for the preservation and promotion of classical, traditional and contemporary performing and visual arts.
- To establish, equip and maintain schools, auditoria, libraries, archives, museums, studios, workshops and other facilities necessary to fulfil the above objectives.
- To disseminate knowledge, promote appreciation, provide training and sponsor or undertake scientific research in these fields with the objective of further development by encouragement of innovation within India and by interaction with the arts of other countries.

== Theatres ==
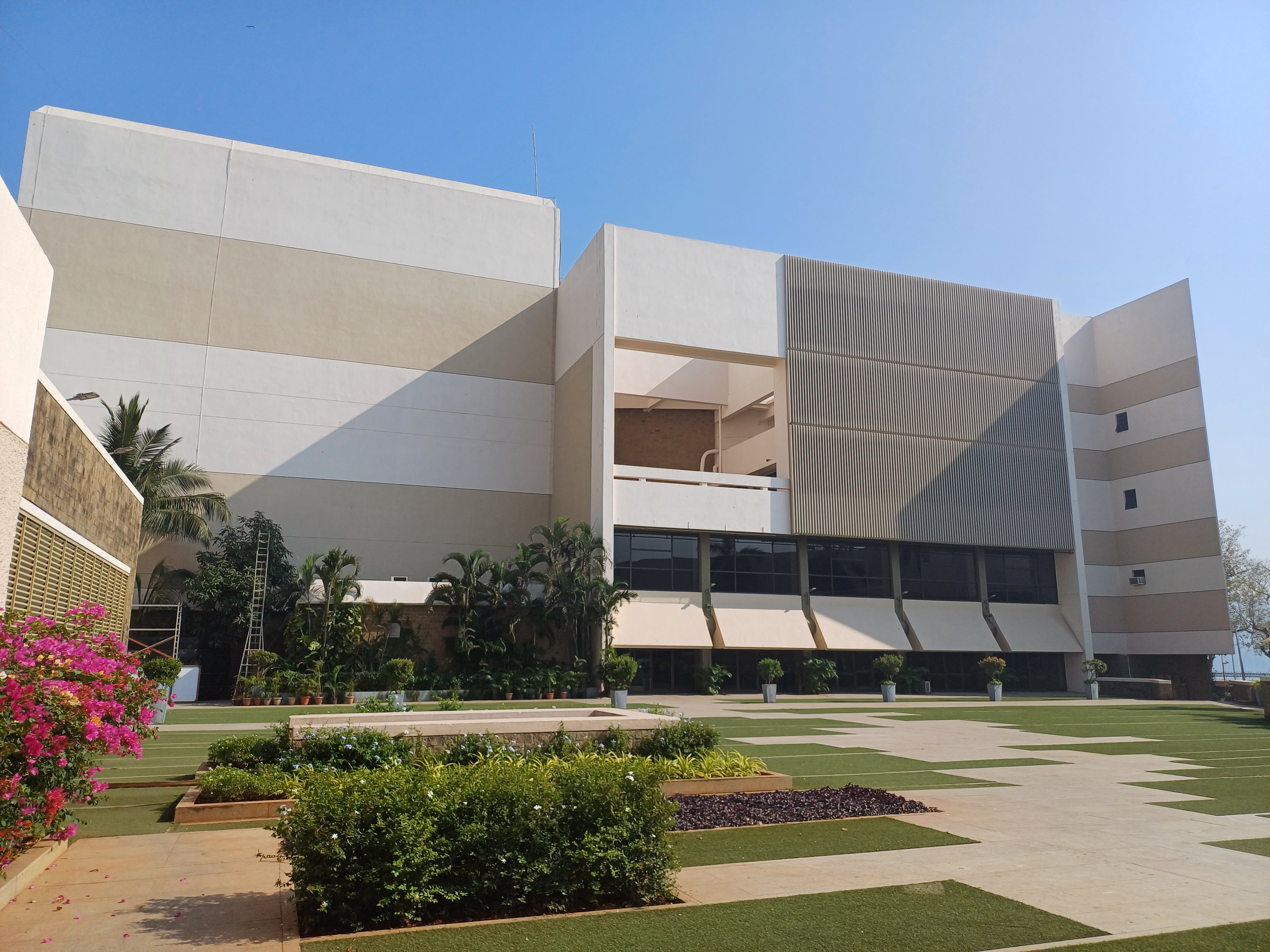
Jamshed Bhabha Theatre at NCPA, Mumbai

The NCPA complex occupies an area of about 32,000 square metres (340,000 ft^{2}) at Nariman Point, on land reclaimed from the sea.

It has 5 theatres in its premise, each catering to a unique genre of performing arts

Jamshed Bhabha Theatre, From large format orchestras to full-scale operas, the most technically complex performances can be staged at this Proscenium theatre with a seating capacity of 1,109. Named after the founder, and operational since 1999, its technical facilities allow for international productions of opera, ballet and major musicals.

The theatre features a marble staircase and a double-height foyer. The staircase was relocated from another site and incorporated into the building as an architectural feature. The venue hosts theatrical productions and other performances.

Tata Theatre can seat 1,010 people. The venue features a revolving stage and a foyer with a view of the sea. The Tata Theatre is known for its acoustics. The building’s concept was created by American Modernist architect Philip Johnson. Rustom Patell-Patell Batliwala & Associates were the principal designers along with acoustician Cyril Harris. The theatre opened in 1982. Today, this Mumbai venue hosts Indian classical concerts, Western chamber music, and theatre.

Experimental Theatre, As flexible as its name, this theatre opened in 1986 and has 300 movable seats which allow it to be configured to suit a range of events. Its unique 'black box' auditorium is the perfect platform for innovative theatre productions as well as small-scale dance and music performances. It also doubles up as a teaching and workshop space.

Godrej Dance Theatre (funded by Pirojsha Godrej Foundation) is a small theatre was inaugurated in 1987, with a capacity of 200. Its small size allows everyone in the audience to have an intimate experience and appreciate dance up close.

Little Theatre was inaugurated in 1975, and is a smaller venue, seating only 114. It is mainly used to nurture and promote new talent, such as poets, dancers and musicians. It is also used for film screenings.

=== Other facilities ===
- Piramal Art Gallery
- Reading and listening libraries
- Studio for archival documentation of dance, drama and music
- Teaching and research block
- Computerised music research laboratory
- Audio-visual archival vault with over 4,000 hours of recording and theatre research material, and a computerised databank for easy retrieval

== Performances ==
Throughout the years NCPA hosted many performances including classical, traditional and contemporary performing arts in dance, theatre, and music. Notable Indian performers who performed at NCPA include Vilayat Khan, M. S. Subbulakshmi, Birju Maharaj, Kelucharan Mohapatra, Savitha Sastry, Mani Madhava Chakyar, Shakuntala, Smita Patil, Parveen Sultana and Shabana Azmi.

NCPA has also attracted many international performers including Yehudi Menuhin, Israel Philharmonic Orchestra, Navoi Bolshoi Ballet of Uzbekistan, Marcel Marceau, Barber of Seville opera, production of Jane Eyre, and other British Council commissioned theatre productions. In 2006, New Jersey Ballet staged India's first full-length classical ballet with its Nutcracker production. In 2016, NCPA in association with Shapoorji Pallonji Group, co-produced Mughal-e-Azam, a Broadway-style musical based on the 1960 Bollywood film Mughal-e-Azam, which was directed by K. Asif and produced by Shapoorji Pallonji.

== See also ==
- Tata Theatre
- Jamshed Bhabha Theatre
