= Vijay Nair (author) =

Vijay Nair was a writer based in Bangalore. He was the author of Let Her Rest Now (fiction), published by Hachette India, 2012, The Boss is not your Friend (non-fiction) published by Hachette India in 2011, Master of Life Skills (fiction) published by HarperCollins in 2006, and a collection of plays in 2003. He was also a theatre director, critic and columnist, and organisation coach and consultant. A recipient of the Fulbright Senior Research Grant and the British Council Charles Wallace Award, he was also awarded a US State Department Grant to attend the International Writers Program at the University of Iowa. He died of cardiac arrest on 5 September 2013 in Bangalore.
