= Umrao Jaan (2006 film) =

2006 Indian film by J. P. Dutta

- Theatrical release poster
- Directed by: J. P. Dutta
- Written by: J.P.Dutta
- Screenplay by: J.P. Dutta; O.P. Dutta
- Based on: Umrao Jaan Ada by Mirza Hadi Ruswa
- Produced by: J. P. Dutta
- Starring: Aishwarya Rai; Abhishek Bachchan; Sunil Shetty; Shabana Azmi
- Cinematography: Ayananka Bose
- Edited by: J. P. Dutta
- Music by: Anu Malik
- Distributed by: Adlabs
- Release date: 3 November 2006
- Running time: 189 minutes
- Country: India
- Languages: Hindi; Urdu
- Budget: ₹15 crore
- Box office: est. ₹19.52 crore

Umrao Jaan is a 2006 Indian period musical film romantic drama film produced and directed by J. P. Dutta, based on the Urdu novel Umrao Jaan Ada, and is about the famous Tawaif of the title. Aishwarya Rai stars in the lead role along with Abhishek Bachchan, Shabana Azmi, Sunil Shetty, Divya Dutta, Himani Shivpuri and Kulbhushan Kharbanda in supporting roles.

Produced on a budget of ₹150 million, Umrao Jaan was released on 3rd November 2006 in 600–700 screens worldwide and grossed ₹195.2 million. The film is regarded as both a critical and commercial failure.

== Plot ==
In 1840, a teen-aged girl named Ameeran is kidnapped from her home in Faizabad by Dilawar Khan (Vishwajeet Pradhan), a criminal, who had been sent to jail years before based on testimony from Ameeran's father. To take revenge, Dilawar sells Ameeran to a brothel in Lucknow, owned by Khanum Jaan (Shabana Azmi). There, Bua Hussaini (Himani Shivpuri) and Maulvi Sahib (Kulbhushan Kharbanda) look after her as their own daughter. In the company of Khurshid (Ayesha Jhulka), Bismillah (Divya Dutta), and one of the tawaif's sons, Gauhar Mirza (Puru Raaj Kumar), Ameeran learns the art of being a tawaif.

Ameeran, now renamed Umrao Jaan (Aishwarya Rai), grows into a beautiful lady. She catches the eye of Nawab Sultan Khan (Abhishek Bachchan), and the pair begins a romance. When Sultan's father hears of their relationship, he disowns his son. Sultan goes to stay at his uncle's house.

In his absence, Faiz Ali (Sunil Shetty) becomes infatuated with Umrao. Though she rejects his advances, he determinedly pursues her and eventually asks her to accompany him to his home in Daulatabad. Umrao accepts, but only upon learning that they will be traveling through Ghari, where Sultan lives. Along the way, both are arrested by a group of state soldiers, and Faiz Ali is revealed to be a wanted dacoit. Upon learning of the situation, Sultan reaches to meet Umrao, but first encounters Ali, who has been imprisoned. Ali, realising that Umrao only accompanied him so she could reunite with Sultan, manipulates Sultan into believing that he and Umrao had a sexual relationship. Feeling betrayed by Umrao, Sultan has her escorted back to Lucknow.

When she returns, it is revealed that Maulvi Sahib, her adoptive father, had died while she was away. Taking advantage of Umrao's emotional state, Gauhar Mirza tries to have sexual intercourse with her. When she resists, he rapes her.

Soon after, the British attack the city, and she is forced to flee, eventually traveling to her childhood home in Faizabad. There, she learns of her father's death, and meets the rest of her family. Because of her profession, they refuse to accept her. Devastated, Umrao journeys back to Lucknow and on the way encounters Dilawar Khan, her kidnapper. Dilawar, homeless and afflicted with leprosy, begs Umrao for help, not recognising her. She gives him her gold bangles and prays for his forgiveness.

Umrao spends the remainder of her life in Lucknow, where she becomes renowned for her poetry.

== Cast ==
- Aishwarya Rai as Ameeran (Umrao Jaan)
  - Bansree Madhani as young Ameeran
- Abhishek Bachchan as Nawab Sultan Khan
- Shabana Azmi as Khanum Jaan
- Sunil Shetty as Faiz Ali
- Divya Dutta as Bismillah
- Himani Shivpuri as Bua Hussaini
- Puru Raaj Kumar as Gauhar Mirza
- Kulbhushan Kharbanda as Maulvi Sahib
- Ayesha Jhulka as Khurshid
- Bikram Saluja as Ashraf (Nawab Sultan's friend)
- Parikshat Sahni as Ameeran's father
- Maya Alagh as Ameeran's mother
- Vishwajeet Pradhan as Dilawar Khan (Ameeran's abductor)
- Javed Khan as Peer Baksh (Dilawar Khan's accomplice)
- Vimarsh Roshan
- Alexandre Boisvert as Sultan Khan

== Production ==
According to Dutta, the film is based on the script written by his father O. P. Dutta, which in turn was adapted from the classic Urdu novel Umrao Jan Ada by Mirza Hadi Ruswa. The film was shot on location including some palaces in Jaipur. Saroj Khan was selected to choreograph the dances, but backed out owing to disagreements with director J. P. Dutta. She was replaced by Vaibhavi Merchant.

Several of the cast were changed during pre-production. Priyanka Chopra was considered to play the part of Umrao Jaan, but could not allot the ninety consecutive dates required for shooting due to her prior commitments to Bluffmaster! (2005). Arshad Warsi was to star in the film as Gauhar Mirza, but dropped out soon after as he chose to appear in Lage Raho Munna Bhai (2006). Subsequently, Puru Raaj Kumar replaced Warsi. Shabana Azmi, who plays the role of Khannum Jaan, is the daughter of Shaukat Azmi, who played the same role in the 1981 version.

== Soundtrack ==
Umrao Jaan

Soundtrack album by Anu Malik
- Released: 4th October 2006
- Recorded: 2005
- Genre: Feature film soundtrack
- Length: 50:38
- Language: Hindi / Urdu
- Label: T-Series
- Producer: Anu Malik

Anu Malik chronology
Jaan-E-Mann (2006)	Umrao Jaan (2006)	Undertrial (2007)

The music is by Anu Malik and the lyrics are by Javed Akhtar. The full album is recorded by Alka Yagnik, Anmol Malik, Richa Sharma and Sonu Nigam, and was released on T-Series label. Malik's daughter Anmol Malik made her singing debut with this album, she rendered her voice for "Agle Janam Mohe Bitya (Reprise)".

Track list
No.	Title	Lyrics	Singer(s)	Length
1.	"Agle Janam Mohe Bitya"	Javed Akhtar	Richa Sharma	7:03
2.	"Bekha Diya Hamein"	Javed Akhtar	Alka Yagnik, Sonu Nigam	6:16
3.	"Ek Toote Huye Dil Ki"	Javed Akhtar	Alka Yagnik	2:02
4.	"Foreword"	Javed Akhtar	Javed Akhtar	0:41
5.	"Jhute Ilzaam"	Javed Akhtar	Alka Yagnik	6:39
6.	"Main Na Mil Saku Jo Tumse"	Javed Akhtar	Alka Yagnik	7:19
7.	"Pehle Pehel"	Javed Akhtar	Alka Yagnik	5:57
8.	"Pooch Rahe Hain"	Javed Akhtar	Alka Yagnik	6:24
9.	"Salaam"	Javed Akhtar	Alka Yagnik	5:36
10.	"Agle Janam Mohe Bitya (Reprise)"	Javed Akhtar	Anmol Malik	2:41
Total length:				50:38

== Reception ==
The film performed poorly at the box office, grossing only Rs. 6,49,00,000. The film received negative reviews from critics. Many of them reacted unfavourably to J. P. Dutta's direction and the film's three-hour running time, and several critics panned it while comparing it to the highly acclaimed 1981 version directed by Muzaffar Ali.

BBC film critic Poonam Joshi concluded, "J. P. Dutta's film is an Ash-fest that adds little to the legacy of Umrao Jaan." She praised Azmi's performance as "exemplary" and wrote about Rai, "While only Rai could emulate the grace and poise of Rekha, she doesn't quite capture the intensity of Umrao's abiding melancholy", later commenting that "her incandescent beauty and artistry... does indeed keep the audience watching, though not necessarily emotionally engaged." Describing Rai's performance, Nikhat Kazmi wrote, "she's riveting in places, diligent throughout and tries so hard to recreate a lost world of grandeur that your heart almost goes out to her." while Rediff gave two and a half rating out of five and wrote "there is Rai the star, queen and saving grace of Umrao Jaan. She enthralls with her gorgeousness, the precision in her dance movements, elegance in her gestures and sincerity in her willingness to become Umrao Jaan".

Susan Muthalaly from The Hindu wrote, "Umrao Jaan remains a spectacle that does nothing for you, personally." She wrote about Rai, "You'd think that since she's playing someone so close to her real life, there would be real feeling in the performance. But remember, this is a realistic performance, so Rai stays true to her real-life character and shows no genuine emotion for most of the film. She dances like a dream, but her range of emotions is limited." Another review in The Hindu said, "Umrao Jaan of 2006 would be at best remembered as a poor man's remake of a classic or a love story with a period flavour."

The Tribune concluded that "Umrao Jaan fails to impress" and while referring to Rai's performance wrote, "She is no match to Rekha". Seena Menon of Deccan Herald said, "Unfortunately, watching 19th-century Lucknow in the 2006 version of Umrao Jaan gives you nothing but a feeling akin to staring at a glass model of the original."

Kathakali Jana from Hindustan Times wrote, "Though comparing the film with the 1981 magnum opus is not fair, what does one do with a baggage of incredible weight? One simply remembers it again and decides to go back to it once more." Similarly, Jana wrote about Rai that she "looks lovely when she smiles. She looks lovelier when she cries. Dutta's screenplay – which runs into 180 excruciating minutes – allows her to do both in good measure. But where is the celebrated 19th-century tawaif of Lucknow whose untold sufferings could do nothing to strip her of her dignity?"

Ziya Us Salam wrote for the same newspaper in a more positive review, "At its soul, body, even content, this Umrao Jaan is as beautiful as its leading lady (Rai), the one who once had the world at her feet." Gullu Singh, another reviewer for Rediff, praised the film for being more loyal to the novel."

Worldwide, the film grossed Rs. 19.52 crore, including $485,000 at the U.S. box office.
