= Kaniz =

Kaniz was a term that referred to a female slave or slave concubine in Safavid Iran. Kaniz may also refer to:

== Given name ==
=== Kaniz ===
- Kaniz Fatema Ahmed (born 1956), Bangladeshi politician
- Kaniz Ali (born 1985), Bangladeshi-born British makeup artist and freelance beauty columnist
- Kanizat Ibrahim (born 1975), Comoran business manager and football administrator
- Kaniz Wajid Khan (1920–2021), Pakistani social activist and civil servant
- Kaniz Fatema Roksana (1955–1984), Bangladeshi female commercial pilot
- Kaniz Suborna, Bangladeshi pop singer

=== Kenizé ===
- Kenizé Mourad (born 1939), French journalist and novelist

== Places ==
- Tappeh Kaniz, a village in Qorqori District, Hirmand County, Sistan and Baluchestan Province, Iran

== See also ==
- Kaneez (disambiguation)
