= Shahryar (poet) =

Indian academic and writer (1936–2012)

Akhlaq Mohammed Khan Shahryar
- Born: 16 June 1936; Aonla, Bareilly district, United Provinces of Agra and Oudh, British India
- Died: 13 February 2012 (aged 75); Aligarh, Uttar Pradesh, India
- Education: Aligarh Muslim University
- Occupations: Educator, poet, lyricist
- Writing career
- Language: Urdu
- Genres: Ghazal, Nazm
- Subjects: Love, Philosophy
- Notable awards: Sahitya Akademi Award (1987); Jnanpith Award (2008)

Akhlaq Mohammad Khan (16 June 1936 – 13 February 2012), better known by his pen name (takhallus in Urdu language) Shahryar, was an Indian academic, and a doyen of Urdu poetry in India.

As a Hindi film lyricist, he is best known for his lyrics in Gaman (1978) and Umrao Jaan (1981) directed by Muzaffar Ali. He retired as the head of the Urdu Department at the Aligarh Muslim University, and thereafter he remained a sought-after-name in mushairas or poetic gatherings, and he also co-edited the literary magazine Sher-o-Hikmat.

He was awarded the Sahitya Akademi Award in Urdu for Khwab Ka Dar Band Hai (1987), and in 2008 he won the Jnanpith Award, the highest Indian literary award, becoming only the fourth Urdu poet to win the award. He has been widely acknowledged as the finest exponent of modern Urdu poetry.

== Early life and education ==
Shahryar was born in 1936 at Aonla, Bareilly to a Muslim Rajput family. His father Abu Mohammad Khan was posted as a police officer, though the family hailed from village Chaundhera in Bulandshahr District, Uttar Pradesh. He received his early education at Bulandshahr.

In his childhood days, Shahryar wanted to be an athlete but his father wanted him to join the police force. It is then that he ran away from home and was guided by Khaleel-Ur-Rehman Azmi, the eminent Urdu critic and poet. He then studied at Aligarh Muslim University and received his BA degree in psychology in 1958. He joined MA in psychology but quit it after a year and got admission to the Urdu department of AMU. In 1961 he passed his MA in Urdu. He also completed his Ph.D. in Aligarh.

== Career ==
Shahryar started his career as a writer at Hamari Zubaan, the weekly magazine of the Anjuman Tarraqqi-e-Urdu in 1961 and worked there until 1966. After that in 1966, he joined Aligarh Muslim University as a lecturer in Urdu. He was appointed professor in 1986 and in 1996, he retired as chairman of the Urdu Department. He co-edited the literary magazine Sher-o-Hikmat (Poetry and Philosophy).

=== Literary career ===
His first poetry collection Ism-e-azam was published in 1965, the second collection, Satvan dar (Satva yet in English), appeared in 1969, and the third collection titled Hijr Ke Mausam was released in 1978. His most celebrated work, Khwab Ke Dar Band Hain, arrived in 1987, which also won him the Sahitya Akademi Award in Urdu for that year. In addition, he published five collections of his poetry in Urdu script. In 2008, he became the fourth Urdu writer to win the Jnanpith Award, after Firaq, Ali Sardar Jafri, and Qurratulain Hyder.

=== Lyricist ===
Shahryar wrote lyrics for select films, only from Aligarh where he was approached by filmmakers. Muzaffar Ali and Shahryar were friends from their student days, and Shahryar had shared some of the ghazals with him. Later when Ali made his directorial debut with Gaman in 1978, he used two of his ghazals Seene Mein Jalan Ankhon Mein Toofan Sa Kyun Hai and Ajeeb Saneha Mujhpar Guzar Gaya Yaaron in the film, and they are still considered classic. All his ghazals from Umrao Jaan, 'Dil Cheez Kya Hai Aap Meri Jaan Lijiye', 'Ye Ka Jagah Hai Doston', 'In Aankhon Ki Masti Ke' are among the finest lyrical works in Bollywood. He also wrote for Yash Chopra's Faasle (1985), thereafter Chopra offered him three more films to write for him, but he refused as he didn't want to become a "song shop". Though he wrote for Muzaffar Ali's Anjuman (1986). He also left behind unfinished contributions to Ali's Zooni and Daaman.

== Personal life ==
Shahryar married Najma Mahmood, a teacher in the English department in the Women's College at Aligarh in 1968. They had three children, Humayun Shahryar, Saima Shahryar, and Faridoon Shahryar who is an entertainment journalist. He died on 13 February 2012 in Aligarh, Uttar Pradesh, after a prolonged illness due to lung cancer.

== Awards ==
- Sahitya Akademi Award in Urdu for his poetry collection, Khwab Ka Dar Band Hai (1987).
- The fourth Urdu writer to win the Jnanpith Award – 2008.
- Firaaq Samman award.
- Delhi Urdu Academy's All India Bahadur Shah Zafar Award.

Four theses have been written on Shahryar's works.

== Selected bibliography ==
- Ism-e-Azam, 1965.
- Saatwan Dar, 1969.
- Hijr Ke Mausam, 1978.
- Khwab Ke Dar Band Hain, 1987
- Neend ki Kirchen – (English: Shards of Shattered Sleep).
- Mere Hissay Ki Zameen
- Through the Closed Doorway: A Collection of Nazms by Shahryar, tr. Rakhshanda Jalil. 2004, Rupa & Co., ISBN 81-291-0458-X.
- Shahryar, Akhlaq Mohmmad Khan: Influence of the western criticism on the Urdu criticism, Aligarh.
- Dhund ki Roshni (English: The Light of Dusk): Selected Poems of Shahryar, 2003, Sahitya Akademi, ISBN 81-260-1615-9.

== Cited sources ==
- Jalil, Rakhshanda (25 August 2018). Shahryar: A Life in Poetry. HarperCollins. ISBN 978-93-5302-031-6.
