= Gaman =

- Theatrical release poster
- Directed by: Muzaffar Ali
- Written by: Hriday Lani
- Produced by: Muzaffar Ali
- Starring: Farooq Shaikh; Smita Patil; Gita Siddharth Nana Patekar
- Cinematography: Nadeem Khan
- Edited by: Jethu Mundul
- Music by: Jaidev; Shahryar
- Distributed by: Integrated Films
- Release date: 1978 (India)
- Running time: 135 minutes
- Country: India
- Languages: Hindi; Urdu

Gaman is a Hindi film released in 1978, starring Farooq Sheikh and Smita Patil in the lead roles and introducing Nana Patekar in a supporting role. It is the directorial debut of Muzaffar Ali, who went on to make Umrao Jaan (1981). The film deals with the issue of the futility of urban migration, using the story of a migrant from Uttar Pradesh to Mumbai, who tries to find a foothold in his new life as a taxi driver.

The film's music was by Jaidev, who won the National Film Award for Best Music Direction in 1979 for his work, and for the song "Aap ki Yaad Aati Rahi", Chhaya Ganguly won a National Film Award for Best Female Playback Singer. Shahryar wrote songs for the film, most notably "Seene Mein Jalan, Aankhon Mein Toofaan", sung by Suresh Wadkar, which highlights the alienation and broken dreams of the migrant community. Ghazal singer Hariharan made his playback singing debut with the film.

== Plot ==
In order to improve their lifestyle, Ghulam Hasan (Farooq Shaikh), who hails from Kotwara, Kheri, a town in Uttar Pradesh, decides to relocate to Mumbai, on the insistence of his close friend Lalulal Tiwari (Jalal Agha). He leaves behind his ailing mother and wife (Smita Patil). Lalulal helps him get a job cleaning taxis. Ghulam subsequently learns how to drive, and is hired to drive a taxi. In spite of his best efforts, he is unable to save enough money to visit Kotwara and his family.

Lalulal has problems of his own, in spite of being settled in Mumbai for several years. Having a sweetheart, Yashodra (Gita Siddharth), he is unable to even rent a decent apartment, and lives in a shanty tenement, which is slated to be demolished by the Mumbai Municipal Corporation. Ghulam receives a letter from his wife and learns that his mother's health has deteriorated. Ghulam is in need of about ₹ 500. Lalulal arranges some money for him but advises him to send money by money order instead of going to his hometown.

Ultimately, Lalulal and Yashodara are murdered by the latter's family, as the family wants Yashodara to go to Dubai for work to support them instead of marrying Lalulal. This incident is a big blow to Ghulam and he decides to return to Kotwara, but procrastination prevents him from doing so. Closing shots show him driving his taxi in the city of dreams.

== Cast ==
- Farooq Shaikh as Ghulam Hasan
- Smita Patil as Khairun
- Gita Siddharth as Yashodhara
- Sulabha Deshpande as Vasu's mom
- Jalal Agha as Lallulal Tewari
- Protima Bedi as Passenger doing make up
- Nana Patekar as Vasu
- Satish Shah as Passenger
- Arvind Deshpande as Shankar
- Amir Bano as Amma
- Arun Bhutanatha
- Dinshaw Daji as Parsi passenger
- Hameed
- Arun Joglekar as Ganpat
- Hriday Lani
- Hira Devi Mishra as Lallularam's mother
- Nitin Sethi as Thakur Amar Singh
- Mahabali Singh

== Soundtrack ==
All lyrics are written by Shahryar Makhdoom Mohiuddin; all music is composed by Jaidev.

No.	Title	Singer(s)	Length
1.	"Aap ki Yaad Aati Rahi" (Raga Bhairavi)	Chhaya Ganguly
2.	"Seene Mein Jalan, Aankhon Mein Toofaan"	Suresh Wadkar
3.	"Ajeeb Saneha Mujhpar Guzar Gaya"	Hariharan
4.	"Ras ke Bhare Tore Nain"	Hira Devi Mishra
5.	"Nausha amiron ka"	Hira Devi Mishra

== Awards and nominations ==
Year	Nominee / work	Award	Result
1979	Muzaffar Ali	National Film Award – Special Mention (feature film)	Won
1979	Chhaya Ganguly (for Aap ki Yaad Aati Rahi)	National Film Award for Best Female Playback Singer	Won
1979	Jaidev	National Film Award for Best Music Direction	Won
