= Umrao Jaan Ada (TV series) =

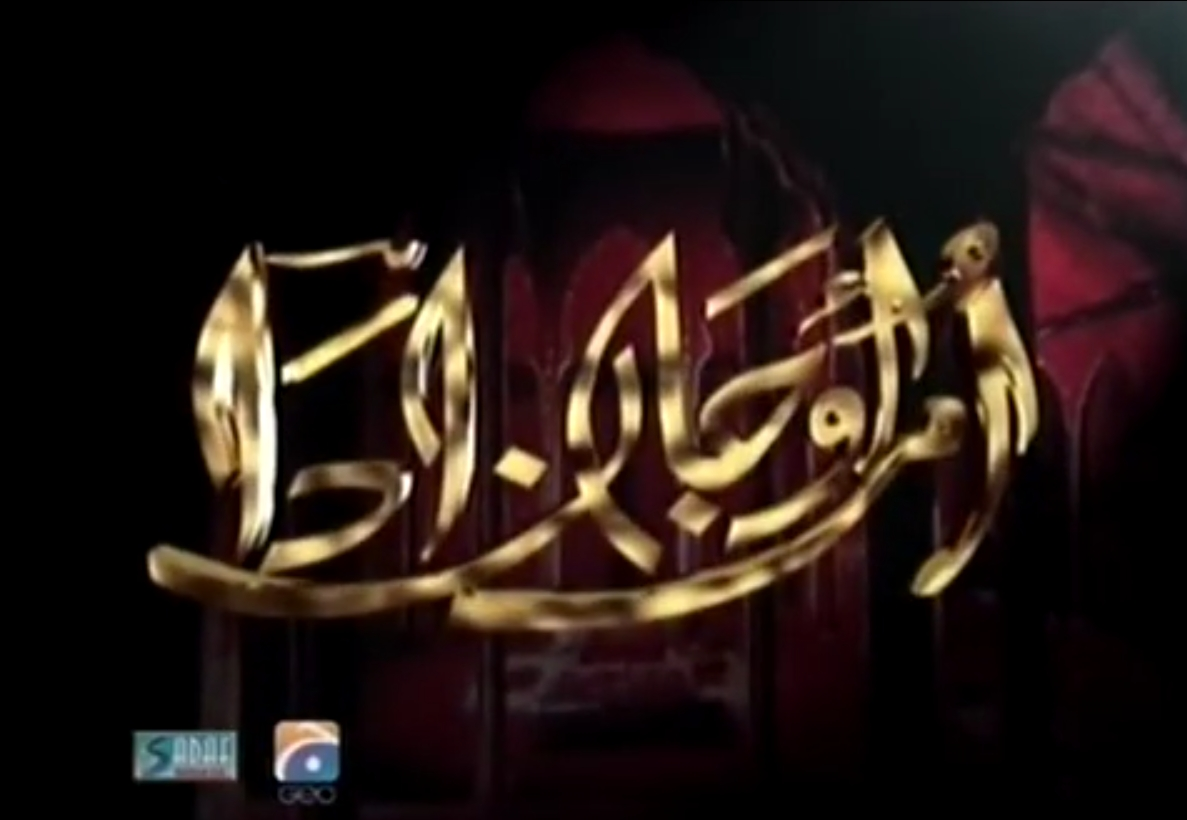
- Based on: Umrao Jaan Ada by Mirza Hadi Ruswa
- Screenplay by: Zehra Nigah
- Directed by: Raana Sheikh
- Starring: Amina Bano; Bushra Ansari; Faisal Qureshi; Imran Abbas; Humayun Saeed; Sadia Imam
- Country of origin: Pakistan
- Original language: Urdu
- No. of episodes: 20

Original release
- Network: Geo Entertainment
- Release: 2003 – 2003

Umrao Jaan Ada is a Pakistani television series based on Mirza Hadi Ruswa's novel Umrao Jaan Ada. It is directed by Raana Sheikh and the script was written by Zehra Nigah. It first aired on Geo Entertainment in 2003. Aamina Bano played the title role of a mid-19th-century tawaif from Lucknow, with Bushra Ansari, Faisal Qureshi, Imran Abbas, Humayun Saeed and Sadia Imam in prominent roles. It is one of the expensive television series made in Pakistan.

The series was noted as too bold for the Pakistani audiences due its strong language, depiction of pioneering portrayal of extramarital romantic relationships, especially after Zia-ul-Haq's Islamisation era, and several mujra performances. The series is considered one of the most faithful adaptations of Ruswa's novel.

== Premise ==
The plot revolves around a young girl from Faizabad who is abducted and sold off to a kotha (brothel) owner of Lucknow to punish her father. There, she becomes an expert courtesan and poetess. After a painful journey of several years, she finally returns to her home where her loved ones don't accept her.

== Cast ==
- Amina Bano as Ameeran /Umrao Jaan
- Bushra Ansari as Khanam Jaan
- Faisal Qureshi as Gohar Mirza
- Imran Abbas as Nawab Sultan
- Humayun Saeed as Faiz Ali
- Sadia Imam as Bismillah
- Mehmood Aslam as Dilawar Khan
- Badar Khalil as Bua Hussaini
- Zeba Shehnaz as Ami Jan
- Salma Hassan as Raam Dai
- Fahad Mustafa
- Meera as Dancer (Dance performance)
- Jia Ali as Dancer (Dance performance)

== Production ==
Umrao Jaan Ada was based on Mirza Hadi Ruswa's eponymous novel. The screenplay was written by poet Zehra Nigah, marking her screenplay debut. Nigah began the scriptwriting in late 1999, and the principal photography commenced in March 2002 in Lahore. The series marked the acting debuts of actors Imran Abbas and Fahad Mustafa.

== Reception ==
A letter to the Dawn criticized the show for using words like "randi" (prostitute) and "mujra", with critics arguing for content warnings, but the newspaper defended it as a portrayal of 19th-century courtesan life, citing Ruswa's novel's context and criticizing growing conservatism in Pakistan.

Of the many other adaptations of the novel, Aamer Hussein found the series as one of the most faithful adaptations of Ruswa's novel.

== Analysis and themes ==
Umrao Jan Ada portrays sexuality and sexual freedom through the lens of a courtesan's life. The series explores how the tawaif is a stock character in South Asian literature, used both as a symbol of sexual service and literary appreciation. The series brings the courtesan’s world into television, sparking debate on morality, sexuality, and gender politics in contemporary Pakistan, where extramarital sex is legally condemned, especially at a time after Hudud Ordinances enacted by Zia-ul-Haq were still resonate.

== Awards and accolades ==
Umrao Jaan Ada received two nominations at the 3rd Lux Style Awards.

- Best TV Actress - Bushra Ansari - Nominated
- Best TV Actor - Faisal Qureshi - Nominated

== See also ==
- Umrao Jaan Ada (film)
