= Umrao Jaan Ada =

1899 Urdu novel by Mirza Hadi Ruswa

- Author: Mirza Hadi Ruswa
- Original title: Umrāʾo Jān Adā
- Language: Urdu
- Genre: Social novel
- Publication date: 1899
- Publication place: India
- English publication date: 1970
- Dewey Decimal: 891.4393

Umrao Jaan Ada (Urdu: اُمراؤ جان ادا) is an Urdu novel by Mirza Hadi Ruswa (1857–1931), first published in 1899. It is considered the first modern Urdu novel by many and tells the story of a tawaif and poet of the same name from 19th century Lucknow, as recounted by her to the author.

== History and theme ==
According to the novel, a tawaif and poet Umrao Jaan from 19th century Lucknow recounts her story to the author, when he happens to meet her during a mushaira (poetic symposium) in Lucknow. On listening to her couplets, the author along with Munshi Ahmad, a novel and poetry enthusiast present at the mushaira, convinces Umrao Jaan to share her life story with them. The novel is written in first person as a memoir. The book was first published by Gulab Munshi and Sons Press, Lucknow in 1899.

The novel is known for its elaborate portrayal of mid-19th century Lucknow, its decadent society, and the moral hypocrisy of the era, where Umrao Jaan also becomes the symbol of a nation that had long attracted many suitors who were only looking to exploit her.

The existence of Umrao Jaan Ada as an actual person is disputed among scholars as there are few mentions of her outside of Ruswa's book. She does appear in his earlier unfinished novel Afshai Raz, but is very different from the cultured character in Umrao Jaan Ada. The existence of an Uttar Pradesh dacoit named Fazal Ali is recorded, and there are British documents that mention the claims of a tawaif named Azizan Bai who stated that she was taught by Umrao Jaan.

== Plot summary ==
Umrao Jaan is born as Amiran (Urdu: اميرن) to a modest family in Faizabad. The testimony of Amiran's father against the criminal Dilawar Khan results in the latter being imprisoned. After Khan is released from jail, he decides to get revenge as Amiran's father. Khan kidnaps Amiran and decides to sell her in Lucknow. She is imprisoned with another girl, Ram Dai, but the two are separated when Dilawar Khan takes her to Lucknow. There she is sold for 150 rupees to Khanum Jaan, the head tawaif of a kotha. She is renamed Umrao and begins to study classical music and dance. Together with the other apprentice tawaif and Gauhar Mirza, the mischievous illegitimate son of a local Nawab, she is taught to read and write in both Urdu and Persian. As Umrao grows up, she is surrounded by a culture of luxury, music and poetry. She eventually gains her first client (earning her the suffix of jaan) but prefers the impoverished Gauhar Mirza, her friend.

Umrao Jaan attracts the handsome and wealthy Nawab Sultan. The couple falls in love, but, after an altercation with an impolite patron where Nawab Sultan shoots and wounds him in the arm, he no longer comes to the kotha and Umrao Jaan must meet him secretly with the help of Gauhar Mirza. As Umrao Jaan continues to see Nawab Sultan and also serve other clients, she supports Gauhar Mirza with her earnings. A new client, the mysterious Faiz Ali, showers Umrao Jaan with jewels and gold, but warns her not to tell anyone about his gifts. When he invites her to travel to Farrukhabad with him, Khanum Jaan refuses and Umrao Jaan decides to run away. On the way to Farrukhabad, they are attacked by soldiers and Umrao Jaan discovers that Faiz is a dacoit and all of his gifts have been stolen goods. Faiz escapes with his brother Fazl Ali and she is imprisoned, but luckily one of the tawaifs from Khanum Jaan's kotha is in the service of the Raja whose soldiers arrested her so Umrao Jaan is freed. As soon as she leaves the Raja's court, Faiz finds her and convinces her to come with him. He is soon captured and Umrao Jaan, reluctant to return to Khanum Jaan, sets up as a tawaif in Kanpur. While she is performing in the house of a kindly Begum, armed bandits led by Fazl try to rob the house, but leave when they see Umrao Jaan there. Soon Gauhar Mirza comes to Kanpur and she decides to return to the kotha.

Umrao Jaan performs at the court of Wajid Ali Shah until the Siege of Lucknow forces her to flee the city for Faizabad. There she finds her mother, but is threatened by her brother who considers her a disgrace and believes she would be better off dead. Devastated, Umrao Jaan returns to Lucknow now that the mutiny is over. She meets the Begum from Kanpur again in Lucknow and discovers that she is actually Ram Dai. By a strange twist of fate Ram Dai was sold to the mother of Nawab Sultan and the two are now married. Another ghost of Umrao Jaan's past is put to rest when Dilawar Khan is arrested and hanged for robbery. With her earnings and the gold that Faiz Ali gave her, she is able to live comfortably and eventually retires from her life as a tawaif.

== Adaptations ==
The novel was adapted as a radio play of the same name with Arsh Muneer in the lead role, which broadcast from Delhi. Over the years the novel has inspired many films both in India and Pakistan. It was made into a Pakistani film in 1972, Umrao Jaan Ada, directed by Hassan Tariq, and the Indian films: Mehndi (1958) by SM Yusuf, Zindagi Ya Toofan (1958) by Nakhshab Jarchavi, Umrao Jaan (1981) by Muzaffar Ali and Umrao Jaan (2006) by JP Dutta.

The novel was also the theme of a Pakistani television serial, Umrao Jaan Ada, aired in 2003 on Geo TV. It was directed by Raana Sheikh and the screenplay was written by poet Zehra Nigah. Umrao Jaan Ada, an Indian television series adaptation of the novel aired on Doordarshan's DD Urdu channel in 2014. It ran for 13 episodes and was directed by Javed Sayyed with music from Sappan Jagmohan.

Salim–Sulaiman remade the 1981 Indian film into a musical play, Umrao Jaan Ada - The Musical, in 2019. This theatrical adaptation was directed by Rajeev Goswami with Pratibha Baghel in the title role of the tawaif.

In January 2023, an eight-part Pakistani series adaptation of the novel was announced with Sajal Aly as the titular Umrao Jaan.
