= Habba Khatoon =

16th century Kashmiri poet-empress

- The Nightingale of Kashmir
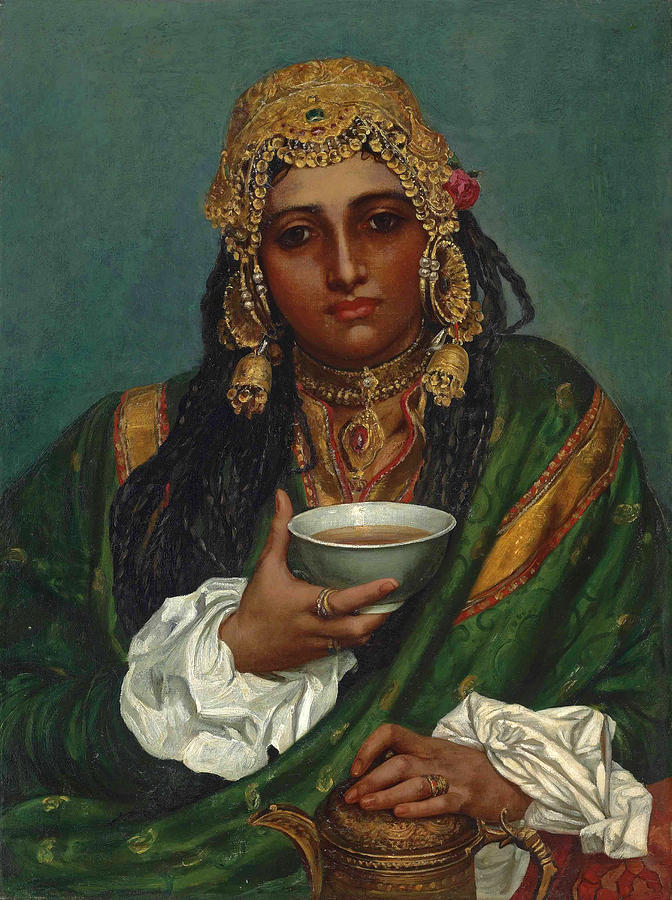
- Posthumous portrait by Valentine Cameron Prinsep, c. 1880

Empress consort of Kashmir
- Tenure: 1579 – 1586
- Born: Zoon Rather; 1554; Chandhur, Pampore, Kashmir Sultanate
- Died: 1609 (aged 54–55); Mughal Kashmir
- Burial: Athwajan, Kashmir
- Spouse: Aziz Lone (divorced): Yousuf Shah Chak
- House: Rather (by birth); Lone (by marriage); Chak (by marriage)
- Father: Abdullah Rather (Abdi Rather)
- Mother: Janam Rather
- Writing career
- Occupations: Poet, singer
- Language: Kashmiri
- Years active: c. 1570 – 1609
- Subjects: Poems and songs about loss and separation
- Notable works: Rah Bakshtam, Harmukh Bartal, Gah Chon Pevan, Tsol Hama Roshay, Chaar Kar Myon Malinyo, Walo Myaeni Poshey Madano, Chaav Myaen Dain Posh

Habba Khatoon (Kashmiri pronunciation: [habɨ xoːt̪uːn]; born Zoon Rather (Kashmiri pronunciation: [zuːn]); sometimes spelt Khatun), also known by the honorary title The Nightingale of Kashmir, was a Kashmiri Muslim poet and ascetic in the 16th century.

Habba Khatoon's music pushed her poetry gradually into learned circles and those who had fled on the works of immortals like Firdausi, Omar and Hafez were bound to raise their eyebrows at first. This wobbling of Habba Khatoon under her peculiar compulsions and with her own limitations created the symphony of romantic words running side by side with mystic poetry till it over stripped and outshone it.

== Early life ==
Habba Khatoon as a figure has been introduced to generations of Kashmiris through folklore and oral traditions. She is said to have been born in the village of Chandur, (Kashmiri: Tsandhor) in the Pampore town of the Pulwama district in Kashmir. Her birth name was Zoon Rather or Zuni (Kashmiri: زوٗن, romanized: zūn, lit. 'Moon'). According to the oral tradition, she was called Zoon because of her immense beauty. Although a peasant, she learnt how to read and write from the village Alimah.

Some circles who have disputed this fact associate her birth with the small glen of Gurez to the north of the valley of the Jhelum. Tradition links a spot near Tsoorawan in Gurez with the poet and it is known even now as the 'hillock of Habba Khatoon'. They take their stand on a legend that Habba Khatoon was born to a petty chieftain in Gurez who passed her on to a Kashmiri trader Hayaband in lieu of the liquidation of his debts. Hayaband married her to his son Habalal, hence the name— Habba Khatoon.

Yet, It is held that the 'hillock' of Habba Khatoon came to be associated with her because of her later contacts when she visited Gurez as the consort of Yusuf Shah Chak.

Abdi Rathar of Chandhur, her father, was a well-to-do farmer and was a man gifted with unusual courage and foresight. Notwithstanding the expected back-talk and open criticism, he made arrangements for the education of his daughter at the hands of a village maulvi. Habba Khatoon received instruction in the study of the Quran and, of course, the Persian classics which, owing to the patronage at the court had become the rage of the times. No further details of this period of her life are available. Perhaps she read Gulistan and Bostan which was the usual fare of pupils in Persian in Kashmir till recently. However, her name spread well beyond the village boundaries and Abdi Rathar's Zoon was referred to as an extraordinary child in hamlets other than Chandhur.

In the course of time, her parents thought of marrying Zoon. She came from a well-to-do family and was educated and accomplished. She was called beautiful and could sing in a sweet, enchanting voice. She could work at home and on the farm to bring prosperity to her family. Her parents chose a peasant, Aziz Lone, to be her husband. His tastes and interests were dissimilar to Zoon. Aziz was stolid to her charm and apathetic to her love. Despite this she was fondly devoted to him in love and fidelity and left no stone unturned in trying to evoke a suitable response from her husband. She worked like a slave at her husband's home and lands. She streamed to fetch water for the household, go to the uplands to fetch firewood and wild edible roots, ply the spinning-wheel and do other chores. Her mother in-law and her husband Aziz were always on the look out for a slip on her part-of course, to have an opportunity to taunt her, abuse her and increase her labour. When she broke an earthenware water-pot by accident she was asked to replace it or pay for a new one.

The situation was pretty bad for her and she realized that life in such an atmosphere was worse than death. She could not make out how her death would profit him. In her song— 'Tche Kyoho Vaatiyo Myaeni Marnai' (What do you stand to gain by my death?) contemplates such an act but concludes on a note of self-introspection but neither the display of emotion in abandon not admonition brought any relief to Zoon in her predicament and Aziz continued to be indifferent to her.

Rah Bakshtam Saer Parvar'digaro
Tche kyoho vatiyo myaeni marnai?

Sipar treh mye paermo kiano
Phyur no kuni gomai zaer zabre
Tche kyoho vatiyo myaeni marnai?

Taph chum badnas Habba Khotunay
Adde no aavham zah te khabray

Teli yikha yil travnam mazaro
Tche kyoho vatiyo myaeni marnai?

Translation:

Oh Allah forgive all my sins and
show me the right way
What do you stand to gain by my death?

I read all the thirty Sipars (Chapters) of Quran shareef;
without making any errors checking the each and every verse carefully; and read it faithfully
What do you stand to gain by my death?

O' Habba, the body aches
Yet, you never came to my help

Will you only come to visit my funeral
What do you stand to gain by my death?

In such circumstances women approach saintly people credited with mystic powers for help. Zoon also must have sought the help of such men, among them one Khwaja Masud. He is said to have given her consolation and predicted a better future for her. He, it is said, also coined for her the name Habba Khatoon which Zoon adopted. But nothing brought even a streak of conjugal delight in the life of Habba Khatoon and she continued to address her laments to her husband.

One of her most famous songs Wolo Myaeni Poshay Madano (Come, my flowery Cupid) graphically representing the state of her mind at the time is surcharged with melancholy, bitterness against the wild talk of the people and vexation at the indifference of her husband. Her complaint is:

Wolo Myaeni Poshey Madano

Dil nith tcholham roshey,
Wolo Myaeni Poshey Madano!

Wolai ve'si' gatchhvai aabas,
Dunya Chhu nendri ta Khaabas,
Praraan chass bo' jawaabas,
Wo'lo...

Translation:

Having snatched my heart you have gone far off,
Come, my Love, my flowery Cupid!

Let us go, friend, to fetch water:
The world is fast a slumber, Love,
I yearn for a response from you,
Come, O Come, my flowery Cupid.

== Later life ==
According to legend, one day Yousuf Shah Chak, the last independent emperor of Kashmir, was out hunting on horseback. He heard Zoon singing under the shade of a chinar tree, and the couple met and fell in love. The oral tradition describes Zoon as Yousuf Shah Chak's queen consort, although there is scholarly debate about whether she was in fact a lower status mistress or member of his harem. She entered the palace in about 1570, and at some point changed her name to become Habba Khatoon (Kashmiri: حَبہٕ خوتوٗن).

Here was the young peasant woman slaving for her loaf, neglected and loathed by her husband, abhorred by his mother and a victim of people's gossip, being entreated by the heir-apparent to take her exalted place in his palace. She had sought love from Aziz Lone which he denied her: she was in need of affection from his mother which she did not give; she expected normal regard and courtesy from society which treated her with disdain. And now she was being offered all this and more. Need less to say that she accepted the offer and entered the palace in circa 1570 Habba Khatoon was of an age when Kashmir suffered much political, social and economic distress. The dynasty of the Sultans distinguished by rulers like the mighty Shahab-ud-Din and the illustrious Zain-ul-Abdin had grown feeble and power passed into the hands of feudal barons who keenly competed with one another in the bid to exercise power in the name of a puppet here or a pretender there.

Habib Shah, the last of the Sultans, was so weak and naive that in 1554 he was deprived of his crown while in full court and nobody raised even a little finger in his support. The throne was next occupied by Ali Khan, a member of the powerful Chak clan. Who are the Chaks? Whatever their origin, in course time, they seem to have settled in the Gilgit Hunza region as conquerors or refugees. Since then the region is known as Dardistan. But these Chaks entered Kashmir as refugees from Dardistan (Gilgit-Hunza region) in the reign of Sahadev (1305-34 A.D.) in the wake of their ruthless chief. Though energetic, Ali Khan Chak was intrepid and was occupied all the time in meeting revolts and confrontations. The Chaks were Shias and the brunt of their proselytising zeal fell on both the Hindus and the Sunni-Muslims. What was worse, the Sunni-Shia rivalry took an ugly turn and distressing form, leading to an extensive cleavage between the two sections of the population, and sympathies of the masses were alienated. A more serious development was the allurement felt by the hawk-eyed Mughal, Akbar, for the beautiful valley of Kashmir. Because of their mutual bickerings and quarrels, disgruntled Kashmiri leaders often sought assistance from the emperor, or his satraps, who encouraged defections and destabilisation.

Habba Khatoon reached the palace when dark clouds of apathy and disdain were rolling against Kashmiri language and art. Another princess with a less forceful character would have found her sensibility smothered and perhaps fallen in line with the average literati in upholding Persian at the cost of Kashmiri. But Haba Khatoon's devotion to her own language and culture proved stronger.

Yousuf Shah Chak was closely attached to Habba Khatoon, and spent considerable time in her company, listening in her music and poetry. The credit for the discovery of the queen of the hills, Gulmarg, is given to Yusuf Shah and his consort who spent much of their leisure time in its sylvan glades. They also are said to have visited Aharabal, Achabal and Sonamarg, even going as far as the Gurais valley where a hillock has been named after Habba Khatoon. Ahrabal and Achabal of the Pir Panjal region, later gained wider renown during the reign of Jehangir.

== The fall of Chaks ==
Ghazi Chak, the first Chak Sultan of Kashmir had a fiery temper which made him excessively unbearable and obnoxious to his subjects. The Emperor Akbar despatched Mirza Qara Bahadur, at the head of a large body of troops to invade the country in order to deliver its inhabitants from the yoke of the tyrant. The army of Qara Bahadur was defeated. The fact remains that this defeat demoralised the Mughals to such an extent that for another 25 years Akbar made no serious attempt to capture Kashmir. In spite of annex the valley continued unabated. Ghazi Shah's body was leprous and after his campaign in Ladakh it became worse and he abdicated in favour of his brother Hussain Khan Shah whom he found master of the situation. Hussain Shah was a poet and, it was said, a man of liberal and secular views but Akbar was watching the condition in Kashmir and his agents sent reports to him. Many selfish and disgruntled leaders, often at loggerheads with each other, sought help from the Emperor.

The Mughals were consolidating their hold on the Indian sub-continent during the second half of the sixteenth century and their eyes now turned to Kashmir. Yusuf Shah Chak who ascended the throne in 1579 A.D. did not display the leadership that was the need of the hour and internal feuds took such a serious turn that he lost the throne in 1580 when he had been king for only a year and two months. With his overthrow the wheel of Habba Khatoon's fortunes changed. Yusuf made several attempts to regain the throne but could make no progress. Within six months there was another occupant on the throne and Yusuf continued to be confined to the wings. At last, he approached the emperor Akbar for armed assistance. Akbar who was watching the developments with no unconcern gave asylum to the fugitive prince and attached him to the grand army. Thereafter he practically slept over Yusuf's plea for assistance to recover his lost kingdom. It was an unexpected trial of Yusuf's diplomacy and perseverance. At home Habba Khatoon was forlorn. Yusuf had left Kashmir with high hopes of returning in a few weeks with Mughal troops and funds to fight the enemies and recover his throne. But weeks slipped by, months, and yet Habba Khatoon had no indication that of him coming back. The absence of her husband once a again raised in her mind the spectre of her beloved being snatched from her. Her intense love would not let her rest in peace while Yusuf was away. Then Akbar helped Yusuf Shah Chak who gave his escort Raja Man Singh a slip and recovered the kingdom of Kashmir after a series of manoeuvres at Sopore in 1581 A.D.

Though later in the year 1586 A.D the Mughals marched into Kashmir and finally annexed it.

She lived after Yusuf's exit from Kashmir for nearly twenty years, or such is the tradition, moving from place to place with no attachments or possessions. Probably, she composed lyrics also but the hankering in her heart has been stilled. There is sorrow in her wail, there is regret and there is bitterness, but there is also resignation.

In her wailing song for her lost husband— Harmukh Bartal she recites:

Harmukh Bartal za'gai Madano
Ye dapham te laa'gayo!

Posh dapham
Gulaab la'gai Madano

Baet'no ye dooraer tchalay Madano
Ye dapham te laa'gayo!

Mushtaq goham kaman Madano
Ye dapham te laa'gayo!
Harmukh Bartal za'gai Madano

Translation:

I will wait at the gates of Harmukh, for you my love
Whatever you ask, I will offer!

Ask for flower
I will offer rose, my love!

I can’t take this distance anymore
Whatever you ask, I will offer!

Yearning, for whom, my love
Whatever you ask, I will offer!
I will wait at the gates of Harmukh, for you my love

== Poetic tradition ==
Although Persian influences had infiltrated the Kashmiri language long before Habba Khatoon, her lyrics offer few examples of her wholeheartedly embracing them. Words of Persian origin are used sparingly in her poetry. Most of the Persian and Arabic words found in her work, such as 'shamaa' (candle), 'ishq' (love) and 'burqa' (veil), had entered the vernacular long before she was born. Using the language spoken by most men and women does not detract from her poetry. In fact, her poetry gains power, appeal and sincerity, impressing readers and listeners alike with its sweet, musical quality. This gives readers an impression of authenticity, as they recognise the strength and variety of their own language in her lyrics, unaided by outside influences. Habba Khatoon deliberately used Persian to revive Kashmiri music, which had been neglected due to a lack of patronage. As Yousuf Shah was a patron of the arts, Habba Khatoon received training from renowned practitioners in the performance of ghazals and songs in the Iranian style. With her remarkable intelligence and rare melodious voice, she became a notable musician in her own right, even among Persian masters. Kashmiri music, cultivated by Harshdev in the 12th century and others, had become heavily influenced by Persian and Central Asian music, incorporating a variety of exotic instruments. As Habba Khatoon was adept in both styles, it was only natural that she would make her own contribution, which she did in the form of a new musical composition known as Raasti-Kashmiri, modelled on Raasti-Farsi, which is sung in the last quarter of the night. She also earned renown for her mastery of a Persian raga known as Muqaami-Iran. Her poems Harmukh Bartal, Char kar myon maalinyo, Vaervain saeth vaar chas no and many others are wailings known as Yadhaaq in Kashmiri.

== Legacy ==
The taqleqkar (pioneer) of loal poetry has been praised by Kalhana in his book- Rajtarangini:

Worthy of homage is the indescribable insight of a poet which excels the stream of ambrosia since through it is achieved a permanent embodiment of glory by the poet and others as well.

The hillock in Gurez Valley, Kashmir is named after Habba Khatoon.

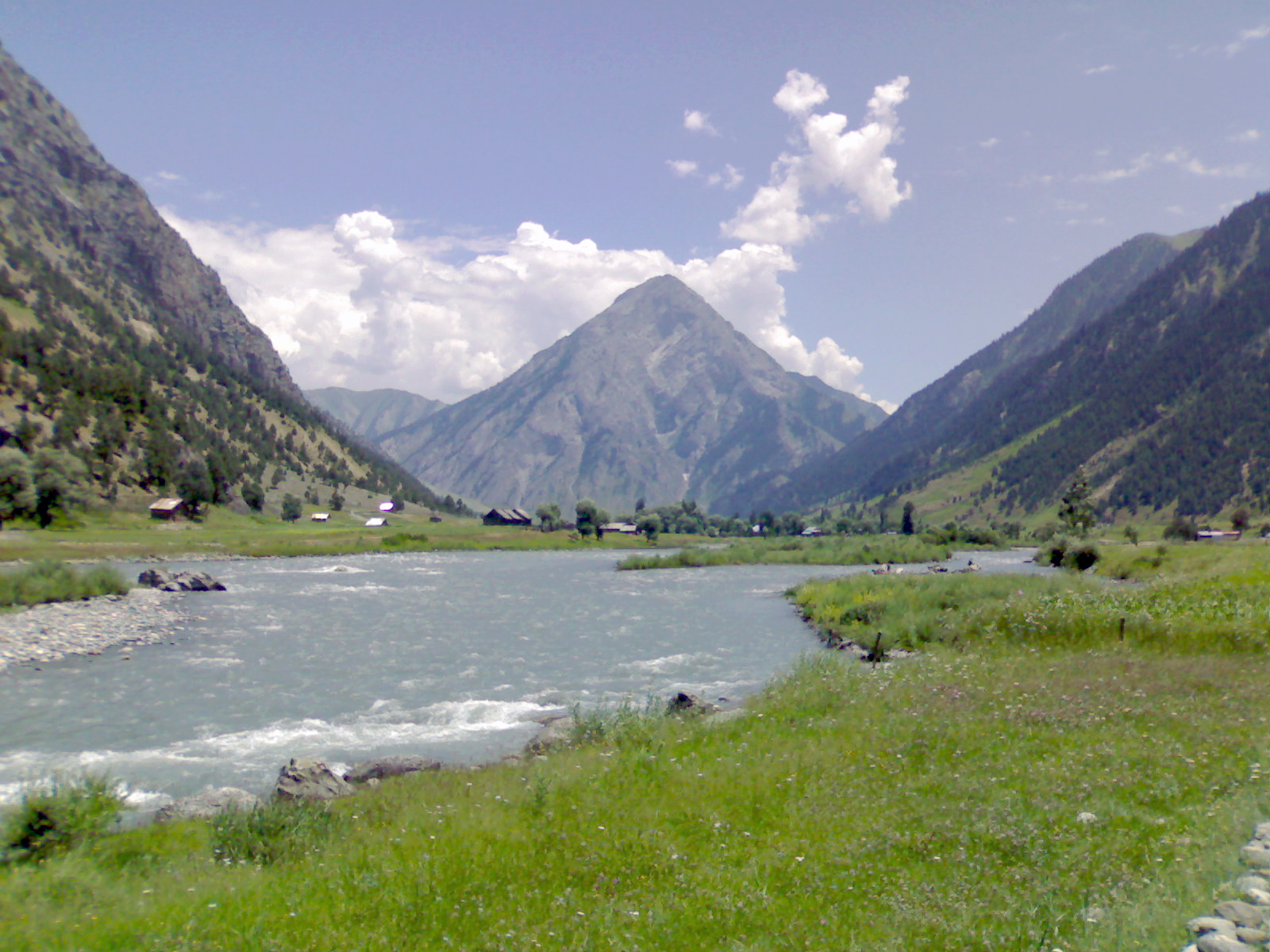
The pyramid-shaped Habba Khatoon mountain, located in Gurez, Kashmir was named after her.

An underpass in Mughalpura, Lahore has been named after Habba Khatoon. The Indian Coast Guard named the ship CGS Habba Khatoon after her.

=== In film ===
- Habba Khatoon (1978) is an Indian Kashmiri-language television film directed by Bashir Badgami for Doordarshan. It starred Rita Razdan in the titular role of the queen. Doordarshan also aired Habba Khatoon, another television show in Hindi on DD National about the poet.
- Mrinal Kulkarni portrayed her role in the Indian television series Noorjahan, which aired on DD National from 2000-2001.
- Zooni is an unreleased Indian Hindi-language film by Muzaffar Ali that was supposed to release in 1990 but was eventually shelved. Earlier unsuccessful attempts in Indian cinema to portray her life on screen included one by Mehboob Khan in the 1960s and in the 80s by B. R. Chopra.

== See also ==
- Kashmiri literature
