= Umrao Jaan Ada (film) =

1972 Pakistani musical drama film

- Directed by: Hassan Tariq
- Screenplay by: Saifuddin Saif
- Story by: Mirza Hadi Ruswa
- Based on: Umrao Jaan Ada by Mirza Hadi Ruswa
- Produced by: Rabia Hassan
- Starring: Rani; Shahid; Nayyar Sultana; Talish; Rangeela
- Music by: Nisar Bazmi
- Release date: 1972
- Country: Pakistan
- Language: Urdu

Umrao Jaan Ada (Urdu: امراؤ جان ادا) is a 1972 Pakistani musical romantic drama film loosely based on the 1899 novel of the same name by Mirza Hadi Ruswa and directed by Hassan Tariq with lyrics and screenplay by Saifuddin Saif. Rani played the title role in the film opposite Shahid while Nayyar Sultana, Talish, Zamurrad, Aasia and Rangeela appeared in supporting roles. It revolves around the life of a 19th-century tawaif from Lucknow and her tragic romance with a Nawab. The film was a golden jubilee hit at the box office.

The film is loosely based on the plot of the novel, with extensive changes done in the second half, including a tragic ending, due to commercial needs, as the film focuses more on the controversy surrounding Nawab Sultan's relationship with Umrao due to her status as a tawaif. Lok Virsa Museum screened the film in 2017 as part of special showcase of the feature films in the country.

== Plot ==
The film begins in Faizabad, where a miscreant kidnaps Ameeran, the daughter of his adversary as a revenge for testifying against him and sells her to Khanum, the prominent head tawaif of a Lucknow's kotha. In that old Nawab era of Lucknow, Ameeran grows up on the kotha and becomes a renowned poetess and tawaif, known as Umrao Jaan Ada.

At a mushaira, Umrao meets a nobleman, Nawab Salim, who becomes infatuated with her beauty, elegance, and poetry. Through the ceremony of Nath Utrai, Salim takes Umrao under his wing, and she becomes bound to him physically and emotionally.

However, in an event by Nawab Nafasat Ali Khan, he insults Umrao during her performance. Salim's silence during her insult hurts Umrao deeply. Despite this, Salim apologizes and marries Umrao, taking her to his servant Chhutten's house.

Khanum is furious when she learns about Salim and Umrao's marriage. Meanwhile, Salim's father decides to marry Salim to his cousin, Farzana. When Salim's son is born, he tries to convince his father to accept his marriage to Umrao, but his father refuses and considers it a disgrace for his status to include a tawaif in his family.

Salim's father threatens to disown him, but Salim leaves anyway. He then visits Umrao and insults her, asking her to leave Salim, but Umrao refuses. He threatens to kill Salim, which frightens Umrao. When Salim arrives and tells him about his father's threat to disown him, Umrao deliberately behaves like a greedy tawaif and insults Salim, taunting him about his poverty. Salim becomes enraged and takes away their child, throwing Umrao out.

Umrao returns to her kotha, and Khanum accepts her back but stops her from dancing. Meanwhile, Salim remains restless, remembering Umrao despite her perceived infidelity. Salim's father visits the kotha and requests Umrao to perform at his mansion to estrange Salim further. Umrao reluctantly agrees and performs at the mansion, where she becomes distraught upon seeing her child, but Salim takes the child away.

When Khanum asks Umrao about her condition, Umrao lashes out at her, awakening Khanum's conscience. Khanum closes the kotha and retires, while Umrao leaves to observe Muharram. On her way, she recognizes her village and visits her home, revealing her past to her mother. However, her mother rejects her due to societal shame.

Meanwhile, Salim's father pressures him to divorce Umrao, but Chhutten, who witnessed Salim's father's interactions with Umrao, breaks his promise to Umrao and reveals the truth to Salim. Salim confronts his father and leaves with his child.

Salim searches for Umrao and finally finds her in Faizabad, where she dies reciting a final Noha, collapsing into his arms. Thus, Umrao sacrifices her life for love, and the film concludes.

== Cast ==
- Rani as Ameeran/ Umrao Jaan Ada
  - Arzoo as young Ameeran
- Shahid as Nawab Saleem
- Nayyar Sultana as Khanam
- Nasira as Bua Hussaini
- Talish as Nawab Sahib
- Zamurrad (Note: credited as Anjum) as Bismillah
- Aasia as Shagufa
- Mumtaz as tawaif
- Rangeela as Chhutten
- Nahid Siddiqui as Farzana
- Meena Shorey as Begum
- Ijaz Akhtar as Nawab Nafasat Ali Khan
- Afzaal Hussain as Fazlu
- Allauddin as Nawab Babban Mirza
- Tamanna Begum as Jaan-e-Mann
- Talat Siddiqui as Ameeran's mother
- Imdad Hussain (cameo)
- Kemal Irani (cameo)

== Music ==
All lyrics are written by Saifuddin Saif; all music is composed by Nisar Bazmi.

Umrao Jaan Ada
| No. | Title | Singer (s) | Length |
|---|---|---|---|
| 1. | "Hathon Mein Kangana, Jhangar Meray Paon Mein" | Runa Laila with chorus |
| 2. | "Aap Farmayen Kia Kharidein Ge" | Runa Laila |
| 3. | "Maney Na Bairi Balma" | Runa Laila, Irene Perveen, Nazir Begum |
| 4. | "Hamaray Samnay Aakr Khud Ki Shan Bethay Hain" | Runa Laila, Ahmed Rushdi |
| 5. | "Jhumein Kabhi Nachein, Kabhi Lehrayen Khushi Se" | Runa Laila |
| 6. | "Kaatay Na Katay Ratya Sayyan Intezar Mein" | Runa Laila |
| 7. | "Na Janay Kis Liye Hum Par Qayamat Dhai Jati Hai" | Runa Laila |
| 8. | "Jo Bcha Tha Wo Lutanay Ke Liye Aaye Hain" | Noor Jehan |

The film had two mujra songs, Jo Bcha Tha Wo Lutanay Ke Liye Aaye Hain by Noor Jehan, and Kaatay Na Katay Ratya Sayyan Intezar Mein by Runa Laila.

== Production ==
The film was produced by Rabia Hassan, daughter of Rani and Hassan Tariq. Production location of the film was Lahore.

== Reception ==
=== Box office ===
The film was a golden jubilee hit at the box office.

=== Critical reception ===
The Statesman praised the performances of several actors, direction and the raw depiction of the Lucknow culture. While commenting on Rani's performance, the reviewer noted that she has "worked hard with dances", "acted very well in the love scenes", and "has come off very well as Umrao"

A review published by Scroll.in in 2017, Nate Rabe compared the film with the Indian version, and was praised for various reasons; recreating the noble Lucknow's culture, Rani's acting as well as dance performances and Bazmi's musical score. The reviewer further found that Indian version was influenced by it.
