= Zuni =

Zuni may refer to:

== Peoples and languages ==
- Zuni people, an indigenous people of the United States
- Zuni language, their language

== Places ==
- Zuni, Virginia, an unincorporated town in Virginia in the United States
- Zuni Pueblo, New Mexico, a census-designated place in New Mexico, United States
- Zuni Salt Lake, in New Mexico, United States
- Zuni River, in New Mexico and Arizona, United States
- Zuni Café, a restaurant in San Francisco, United States

== Other uses ==
- Zuni (rocket), an American air launched unguided rocket
- USS Zuni (ATF-95), an American warship
- Applebay Zuni, a glider

== See also ==
- Zuni ethnobotany
- Zuni mythology
- Zuni music
- Zune
- Zooni, an unreleased Indian Hindi-language film
