= Nasra Wazir Ali =

Pakistani educationist and activist

- ناصرہ وزیر علی
- Born: Nasra Khan; 28 May 1922; Gujrat District, Punjab, British India
- Died: 26 August 2015 (aged 93); Karachi, Sindh, Pakistan
- Resting place: Karachi
- Other name: Begum Nasra
- Education: Lady McLagan High School; Lahore College for Women University
- Occupations: Social Worker; Educationist; Human Rights Activist
- Years active: 1949 – 2015
- Spouse: Wazir Ali (m. 1946; died 1993)
- Children: Shahnaz Wazir Ali (daughter)
- Parent: Malik Maula Buksh (father)
- Relatives: Malik Zafrullah Khan (brother)
- Honours: Sitara-e-Imtiaz (Star of Excellence) award by the President of Pakistan (2012)

Nasra Wazir Ali (née Khan) (May 28, 1922 – 26 August 2015) was a Pakistani educationist and philanthropist. She is best known as the founder of the Education Trust Nasra Schools (ETNS), one of Pakistan's largest private school systems, established in Karachi in 1949. Her legacy is defined by her commitment to providing affordable, high-quality education to children from underserved communities.

== Early life and education ==
She was born on May 28, 1922, Nasra Wazir Ali was the youngest daughter of Malik Maula Buksh, a landlord of Goorali Village in Gujrat District, Punjab. A self-educated man, her father built a school for the village, which Ali attended during her early primary years, despite being the only female student in her class. This progressive background played a pivotal role in shaping her views on female education.

She later attended Lady McLagan High School in Lahore as a full-time boarder from the third grade until her matriculation. Before migrating to Pakistan, she earned a bachelor's degree in education in Delhi.

Described as a bright student, she went on to graduate with honors from Lahore College for Women with a bachelor's degree in English Literature. Before migrating to Pakistan, she also earned a Bachelor of Teaching (B.T.) degree in education in Delhi.

In 1947, following the Partition of India, she and her husband migrated from New Delhi to Karachi with their young daughter, Shahnaz. As a government-allotted bungalow on Bunder Road became their family home, Ali was dismayed by the lack of educational facilities for the many refugee children settling in the area. Driven by her background and compassion, she took action.

Upon arriving in the capital city, which was rapidly filling with refugees, she discovered there were no suitable schools for her daughter. This inspired her to begin teaching neighborhood children in her home's living room. With the help of other mothers, her small class grew rapidly to accommodate the overwhelming demand for education.

== Career ==
In 1949, unable to find a suitable school for her daughter, Ali began teaching neighborhood children in her home's living room. In the same year, with her brother's help, she registered her home school as a not-for-profit organization under the name Froebel School. Inspired by German educationist Friedrich Fröbel, she developed a child-centered, activity-based curriculum and enlisted other mothers to assist with the growing class. In 1949, her brother, Malik Zafrullah Khan, helped her register the school as a not-for-profit organization under the name Froebel School, with the official registration of the Education Trust Nasra School (ETNS) following in 1950.

When government officials informed her that she could not operate a school on government property, Ali began the search for a permanent location. After temporarily relocating to a small rental property near Empress Market, the school eventually moved to its first permanent campus at 55 Depot Lines in Saddar in 1957.

The school was officially renamed Nasra School in 1965. With her brother and husband's support, she acquired land and built additional campuses, expanding the school system to serve students in low-income areas across Karachi.

In the late 1970s, Nasra Wazir Ali and fellow educationist and social worker Kaniz Wajid Khan formed a close friendship and professional partnership. Wajid Khan joined the Education Trust Nasra School (ETNS), serving as chairperson of the board from 1976 to 1980 and as a trustee and advisor thereafter. The collaboration, guided by a shared vision and mutual commitment, led to the establishment of four additional ETNS campuses across Karachi, enabling the expansion of low-cost, quality education to thousands more students.

Ali believed that societal transformation would come through education, particularly girls' education. The school's curriculum emphasized intellectual stimulation and personal growth through academics and extracurricular activities such as sports, music, and drama. Its motto is "Tolerance," reflecting Ali's belief in the importance of empathy, understanding, and respect for diversity. The school also adopted the Aga Khan Board curriculum in 2005 to raise academic standards.

In 2012, she was honoured by the Government of Pakistan with Sitara-e-Imtiaz for her services and her contributions to education.

== Personal life ==
Nasra husband Wazir Ali was a member of the Indian Civil Service. Nasra's daughter, Shahnaz Wazir Ali, is also a prominent educationist and serves as a trustee of the Education Trust Nasra School. Her older brother, Malik Zafrullah Khan, was also a founder and served as the first chairman of the trust.

== Death ==
Nasra Wazir Ali died on August 26, 2015, in Karachi, Pakistan.

== Awards and recognition ==
Year	Award	Category	Result	Title	Ref.
2012	Sitara-e-Imtiaz	Award by the President of Pakistan	Won	Educationist	

== Legacy ==
Her legacy is carried on by the Nasra School System and its alumni. Her daughter, Shahnaz Wazir Ali, a prominent educationist, continues to serve as a trustee and advocates for education reform and women's empowerment. The Nasra School System and its alumni regularly honor her on her birth and death anniversaries.
