= In Ankhon Ki Masti Ke =

Song by Asha Bhosle

from the album Umrao Jaan
- Language: Urdu
- Genre: Ghazal
- Songwriters: Shahryar, Mohammed Zahur Khayyam
- Composer: Mohammed Zahur Khayyam

"In Ankhon Ki Masti Ke" (English: "From the Joy of These Eyes") is an Urdu ghazal by Akhlaq Mohammed Khan, also known by his takhallus Shahryar. It was used as a song in the Indian film Umrao Jaan (1981). The music to this song was composed by Khayyam, and sung by Asha Bhosle.

Rekha, playing the title character of Umrao Jaan, performs the ghazal as part of the mujra of Umrao's debut as courtesan. The mujra marks the first time Umrao sees her love interest, Sultan Nawab, played by Farooq Sheikh. While the lyrics of the song speak of the thousands intoxicated by Umrao's eyes, once she and Nawab see each other, there is space for no other. Umrao spins in her kathak dance whilst singing the song, and her eyes return to Nawab upon completing each round. At the end of the song, she settles into a veiled pose after which she lifts her veil to look directly at Nawab, with a gesture both forceful and erotic to force him to look into her eyes.

Rekha earned National Film Award for Best Actress and singer Asha Bhosle earned National Film Award for Best Female Playback Singer for the movie. In 2017, it was selected as the best song ever picturised on actor Farooq Sheikh by The Times of India.

== Influences ==
The song has been described by singer Bali Brahmbhatt as one of his favorite songs. He later used the song for Asha Bhosle's album Songs of Soul with the singer's 22 other songs.
