= Mehndi (1958 film) =

- Film poster
- Directed by: S. M. Yusuf
- Based on: Umrao Jaan Ada by Mirza Hadi Ruswa
- Produced by: A.A. Nadiadwala
- Starring: Ajit; Jayashree
- Music by: Ravi
- Release date: 1958
- Country: India
- Language: Hindi

Mehndi is a 1958 Hindi film produced by A.A. Nadiadwala and directed by S. M. Yusuf. The music for the film was composed by Ravi. The film stars Ajit and Jayashree in lead roles.

== Cast ==
- Ajit
- Jayashree
- Veena Sapru
- M. Kumar
- Mirza Musharaf
- Balam
- Lalita Pawar
- Krishnakant
- Anwaribai
- Muzaffar Adeeb

== Soundtrack ==
The music of the film was composed by Ravi with lyrics penned by S. H. Bihari, Khumar Barabankvi, Kamil Rashid and Sarvar.

#	Title	Singer(s)	Lyrics
1	"Hazaron Caravan Loote Gaye"	Hemant Kumar, Lata Mangeshkar	S. H. Bihari
2	"Meri Dulhan Bareli Se Aai Re"	Asha Bhosle, Usha Mangeshkar	Khumar Barabankvi
3	"Bedard Zamana Tera Dushman Hai Tau Kya Hai"	Hemant Kumar, Lata Mangeshkar	S. H. Bihari
