= Regards from the Dead Princess =

1987 novel by Kenizé Mourad

- Author: Kenizé Mourad
- Language: French
- Publisher: Éditions Robert Laffont
- Publication date: 1987
- Publication place: France

Regards from the Dead Princess ({French: De la part de la princesse morte), also titled Memoirs of an Ottoman Princess, is a 1987 debut novel by Kenizé Mourad based on her mother's life. It was published in France in 1987 where it sold well. It has been translated into 30 languages and it has a sequel.

== Plot ==
The book tells the story of Selma Rauf Hanim, granddaughter of the Ottoman Sultan Murad V, from her childhood when the Turkish nobility was expelled from the country and scattered around the shores of the Mediterranean. She studied at a French Catholic college in Lebanon. Lack of money forces her to accept an arranged marriage to a Shiite Indian prince. The heroine, who does not resign herself to the weight of tradition, moves to Paris in the middle of the Second World War. She is pregnant, but she will finally be her own woman.

== Background and publication ==
The book took four years to write as Kenizé Mourad wanted to get the research right. Mourad had already worked as a journalist, but she decided to switch to novels. Her mother was an Ottoman princess and her grandfather was Sultan Mourad V, but still she wanted to get it all correct. She spent time on small details to write a book about her family. No one seemed to know what colour the buttons were on the uniforms of the Sultan's guards so Mourad spent some time finding that detail out. Mourad says there is a difference between Muslim and Western women. She cites a proverb that says man is the head and woman is the neck. The neck decides the direction that the head goes in.

== Reception ==
The book was a bestseller in France. The book in English is said to be "awkward writing" with details and feuds that make it too long. The late section where the hero survives in Paris is "hauntingly memorable".

The book has been translated into 30 languages with English versions titled Memoirs of an Ottoman Princess and Regards from the Dead Princess.
