= Kaneez =

Kaneez may refer to:

== Given name ==
- Kaneez Fathima (born 1959), Indian politician
- Kaneez Surka (born 1983), Indian-South African stand up comedian

== Fictional characters ==
- Kaneez Paracha, a fictional character from Ackley Bridge

== Other ==
- Kaneez (1949 film), a 1949 Indian drama film by Krishna Kumar, starring Munawwar Sultana and Shyam
- Kaneez (1965 film), a Pakistani Urdu black-and-white film

== See also ==
- Kaniz (disambiguation)
