= Kaniz Wajid Khan =

Pakistani activist (1920–2021)

- Born: Begum Kaniz Sakina Hussain; 24 June 1920; Lucknow, British India
- Died: 28 August 2021 (aged 101); Karachi, Sindh, Pakistan
- Resting place: Karachi
- Other names: Begum Kaneez Wajid Khan; Princess of Kotwara
- Education: Caineville House School for Girls
- Occupations: Social Worker; Educationist; Civil Servant; Human Rights Activist
- Years active: 1939 – 2021
- Spouse: Sahibzada Wajid Khan (m. 1937; died 1990)
- Children: 2
- Relatives: Selma Sultan (sister-in-law); Kenizé Mourad (niece); Muzaffar Ali (nephew)
- Honours: Tamgha-i-Khidmat (1969)

Kaniz Wajid Khan (née Hussain) was a Pakistani social worker, educationist, human rights activist and civil servant. Kaniz Wajid Khan was a founding member of the All Pakistan Women's Association (APWA) and chair of Education Trust Nasra Schools.

== Early life and education ==
She was born in 1920 at Kotwara during British India. She was daughter of Raja Syed Sajjad Hussain of taluqdari (Aristocrat) Kotwara in Awadh family in the north Indian princely state of Kotwara, Kaniz was orphaned at a young age. Kaniz father died when she was three years old and her mother died two years later, then she and her brother were raised under the care of the Indian Court of Wards and educated at an English boarding school in Mussoorie. She was a Rajkumari (Princess) of Kotwara and after the death of her father then her brother Syed Sajid Hussain became the Raja of Kotwara.

She was sent to Cainville House by the Court of Wards, an English boarding school in the hill station of Mussoorie. Kaniz older brother Syed Sajid Hussain received his academic education at University of Edinburgh in Scotland later he married Princess Selma Sultan, who was the granddaughter of the Ottoman Caliph, Sultan Murad V. At the school, she adopted British manners and etiquette, which would later be complemented by the high-society circles she inhabited after her marriage. She completed her Senior Cambridge qualification.

== Career ==
In 1939, Kaniz Wajid Khan began her social work career by serving as the chairperson of the Central Indian Red Cross Committee, which organized relief efforts for the war. She was inspired by the Pakistan Movement to focus her on social welfare and relief work, particularly for orphans and women.

After the Partition of India then she along with her family moved to Pakistan and she became a founding member of the All Pakistan Women's Association (APWA) in 1949. At the request of Begum Ra'ana Liaquat Ali Khan, she organized the Women's National Guard in Rajshahi, East Pakistan. As APWA's international secretary, she also established the "Friends of APWA" to help secure international exposure and funding.

She was involved in various community projects, including a UN-supported Rural Development Project in Malir in 1952, which provided vocational training, health services, and educational programs. The model for this project was later adopted by the UN for programs in other countries. She also helped establish the first Urban Community Project in Karachi's Lyari area, focusing on training social workers.

In her role as Chief Staff Welfare Officer in the federal government, she implemented welfare projects for government servants. Her initiatives included establishing the first Utility Stores, community centers, vocational training centers, industrial homes, and holiday centers for junior staff.

Her commitment to child welfare led her to be a key member in forming the All Pakistan Council for Child Welfare (APCCW) in 1956, where she was elected its first secretary-general. The APCCW established child welfare committees and opened the first home for abandoned babies. She also co-founded the SOS Children's Village in Karachi for orphaned and abandoned children.

In 1969, she was honoured by the Government of Pakistan with Tamgha-i-Khidmat for her services.

In education, starting in 1980, she served as the general secretary and administrator of the Education Trust Nasra Schools (ETNS), a network providing low-cost education in Karachi. She also served as a member of the Majlis-i-Shura during the regime of President Zia-ul-Haq although she didn't approved his methods on women's rights. She was known for her personal involvement and dedication. She also played a role in establishing the Teachers' Resource Centre in 1986.

She was a close associate and friend of educationist Nasra Wazir Ali, Wajid was a trustee and administrator for the Education Trust Nasra Schools. The schools provide low-cost education to thousands of middle-income children in Karachi.

== Personal life ==
In 1937, she married Sahibzada Wajid Khan, a western civil servant who was a widower with three children and the marriage was arranged by Kaniz's sister-in-law, Princess Selma Sultan. Kaniz husband Sahibzada was the Secretary to the Chamber of Princes. She had two children with him a son and a daughter.

== Illness and death ==
She died from a brief illness at the age of 101 on August 28, 2021 in Karachi.

== Awards and recognition ==
Year	Award	Category	Result	Title	Ref.
1969	Tamgha-i-Khidmat	Award by the President of Pakistan	Won	Social Activist	
