= Chandhara =

Village in Jammu and Kashmir, India

Chandhara or Chandhur or Tsandhor is a village in the Pampore town of district Pulwama in the union territory of Jammu and Kashmir, India. The village is the native home of 16th-century poet and ascetic, Habba Khatoon. It is famous for its saffron, so known as "Saffron Village of Kashmir". Chandhara village is one of the few places in the world where saffron, the world's most expensive spice, grows.

The area is about 20 km from Srinagar City.
