= Tappeh Kaniz =

Tappeh Kaniz تپه كنيز
- Village
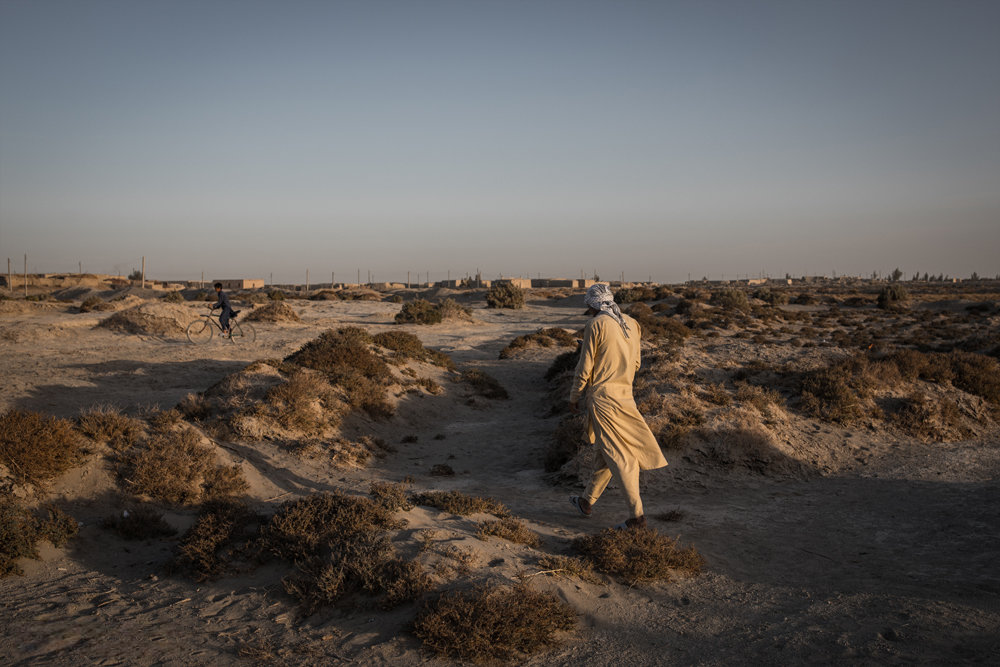

- Location within Iran
- Coordinates: 31°17′02″N 61°44′51″E
- Country: Iran
- Province: Sistan and Baluchestan
- County: Hirmand
- Bakhsh: Qorqori
- Rural District: Qorqori

Population (2006)
  - Total: 464
- Time zone: UTC+3:30 (IRST)
  - Summer (DST): UTC+4:30 (IRDT)

Tappeh Kaniz (Persian: تپه كنيز, also Romanized as Tappeh Kanīz) is a village in Qorqori Rural District, Qorqori District, Hirmand County, Sistan and Baluchestan Province, Iran. At the 2006 census, its population was 464, in 98 families.
