= Kenizé Mourad =

French journalist and novelist (born 1939)

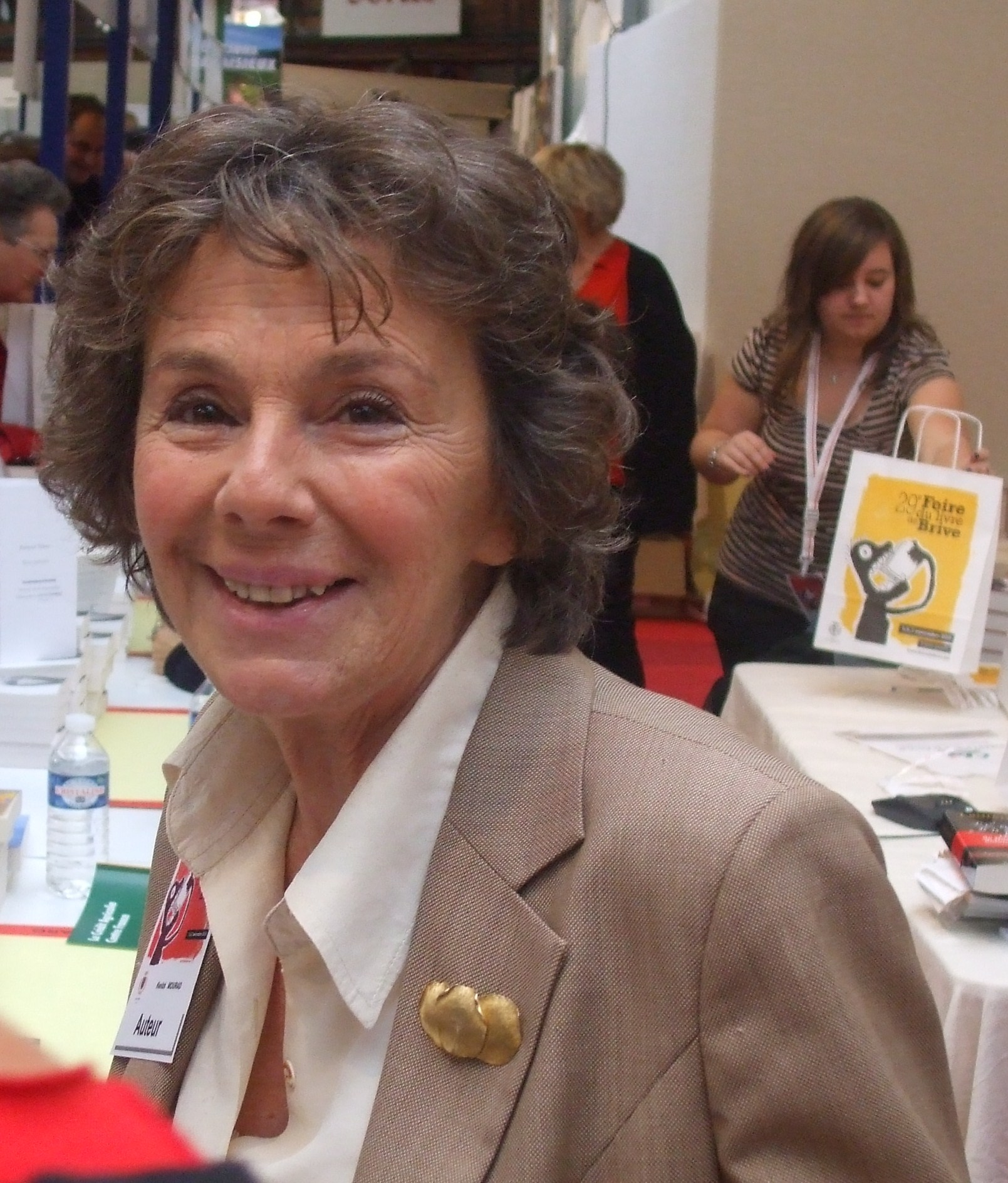
- Kenizé Mourad in 2010
- Born: Kenizé Hussain de Kotwara; 11 November 1939 (age 86); Paris, France
- Other names: Princess Kenizé Mourad; Princess of Kotwara
- Education: University of Edinburgh, University of Paris
- Occupations: Journalist; Writer; Novelist
- Years active: 1968 – present
- Parent(s): Selma Hanımsultan (mother); Raja Syed Sajid Hussain Ali (father)
- Relatives: Muzaffar Ali (half-brother); Kaniz Wajid Khan (aunt); Hatice Sultan (grandmother); Şayan Kadın (great-grandmother); Murad V (great-grandfather)
- Honours: Prix Anaïs Ségalas (1988); Grand prix des lectrices de Elle (1988); Officier des Arts et des Lettres (2012); Chevalier de la Légion d'Honneur (2024)

Kenizé Hussain de Kotwara, generally known as Kenizé Mourad (born 11 November 1939), is a French journalist and novelist. Until 1983, she was a reporter for the Nouvel Observateur working in the Middle East. She then turned to literature, publishing the international best-seller De la part de la princesse morte (Regards from the Dead Princess) in 1987 which told the story of her family. Les jardins de Badalpour followed in 1998, further documenting her family history.

== Early life and education ==
She was born in Paris on 11 November 1939, Kenizé Hussain de Kotwara is the daughter of Selma Hanımsultan, who was the daughter of Hatice Sultan and the granddaughter of Murad V, Sultan of the Ottoman Empire. Her father was the Indian Raja of Kotwara, Syed Sajid Hussain Ali. After her mother died in poverty when she was two years old, she was brought up in a Catholic environment by a French family. Kenizé chose to use the name Mourad in honour of her great-grandfather who spent 30 years in prison.

In 1970, upon graduating from the Sorbonne with a degree in Sociology and Psychology, she became a reporter for Le Nouvel Observateur in the Middle East, covering the Iranian revolution and the war in Lebanon.

== Career ==
After working as a journalist for 12 years, she decided to turn to literature, upset by the censorship she experienced. "My work was never openly rejected," she explained, "but instead I would be told 'The article is too long' or the story would be delayed constantly until I gave up."

From 1983, she conducted four years of detailed research in Turkey, Lebanon and India as a basis for her novel De la part de la princesse morte which was published in 1987. It has been translated into 34 languages with English versions titled Memoirs of an Ottoman Princess and Regards from the Dead Princess. After further research in India, she continued the story of her family in Les jardins de Badalpour, published in 1998 and subsequently translated into 12 languages.

More recently, she has published Le parfum de notre terre : Voix de Palestine et d'Israël (2003) and Dans la ville d'or et d'argent (2010), translated into English, as Our sacred land: voices of the Palestine-Israeli conflict and In the city of silver and gold: the story of Begum Hazrat Mahal.

== Personal life ==
Mourad was raised in a Catholic convent and by a French foster family, growing up largely unaware of her extensive Ottoman and Indian royal heritage until later in life. She lives in Istanbul, Turkey.

== Awards and recognition ==
- She was awarded Prix Anaïs Ségalas in 1988 for her best-selling novel Regards from the Dead Princess (De la part de la princesse morte). This was an annual literary prize from the Académie française dedicated to works by a talented woman writer.
- She was awarded Grand prix des lectrices de Elle and she also received this prestigious award in 1988 for the same novel, which is selected by a jury of amateur readers of the French magazine Elle.
- She was honoured with Officier des Arts et des Lettres (Officer of Arts and Letters) and she was named an officer of this French honor in 2012.
- She was honoured with Chevalier de la Légion d'Honneur (Knight of the Legion of Honor) one of France's highest order of merit, which she was awarded in 2024 in recognition of her significant contributions to literature and journalism. The award was presented to her by the celebrated Lebanese-French author Amin Maalouf.
