= Chhaya Ganguly =

Indian playback singer

Chhaya Ganguly (also spelled Ganguli) is an Indian playback singer. She received National Film Award for Best Female Playback Singer for her first film song "Aapki Yaad Aati Rahi Raat Bhar" at the 26th National Film Awards For the same song, she was nominated for the Filmfare Award for Best Female Playback Singer at the 27th Filmfare Awards.

== Early life ==
She was born in 1952 in Bombay. She obtained her M.Sc degree in Botany from the Bombay University. She worked as a broadcasting programmer for All India Radio and Doordarshan for 35 years in Mumbai, and retired in 2012.

She sang the ballad "Piya Piya" the 1983 Hindi film Trikon Ka Chauttha Kon, directed by Madhusudan. After a long break, she returned in 1990 and sang the title track for Amol Palekar film Thodasa Roomani Ho Jayen, which was composed by Bhaskar Chandavarkar.

== Awards and nominations ==
Year	Work	Award	Result	Ref.
1979	"Aap ki Yaad Aati Rahi"	National Film Award for Best Female Playback Singer	Won	
1979	"Aap ki Yaad Aati Rahi"	Filmfare Award for Best Female Playback Singer	Nominated	
