= Shahnaz Wazir Ali =

Pakistani politician

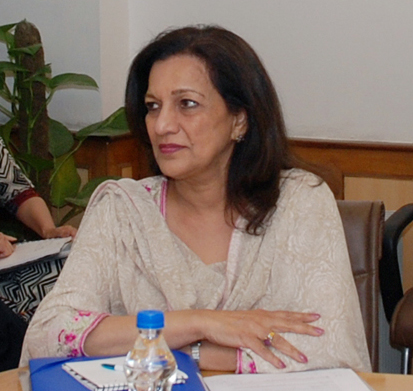

Member of the National Assembly of Pakistan
- In office 2008–2013

Personal details
- Party: Pakistan Peoples Party

Shahnaz Wazir Ali is a Pakistani politician who served as member of the National Assembly of Pakistan from 2008 to 2013.

== Political career ==
She was elected to the National Assembly of Pakistan as a candidate of Pakistan Peoples Party on a seat reserved for women from Punjab in the 2008 Pakistani general election. She was inducted into the federal cabinet of Prime Minister Yousaf Raza Gillani and was made Adviser to the Prime Minister on Social Sector.

In 2012, she was appointed as a special assistant to Prime Minister Raja Pervaiz Ashraf with the status of minister of state.
