= National Film Award for Best Female Playback Singer =

Indian film award

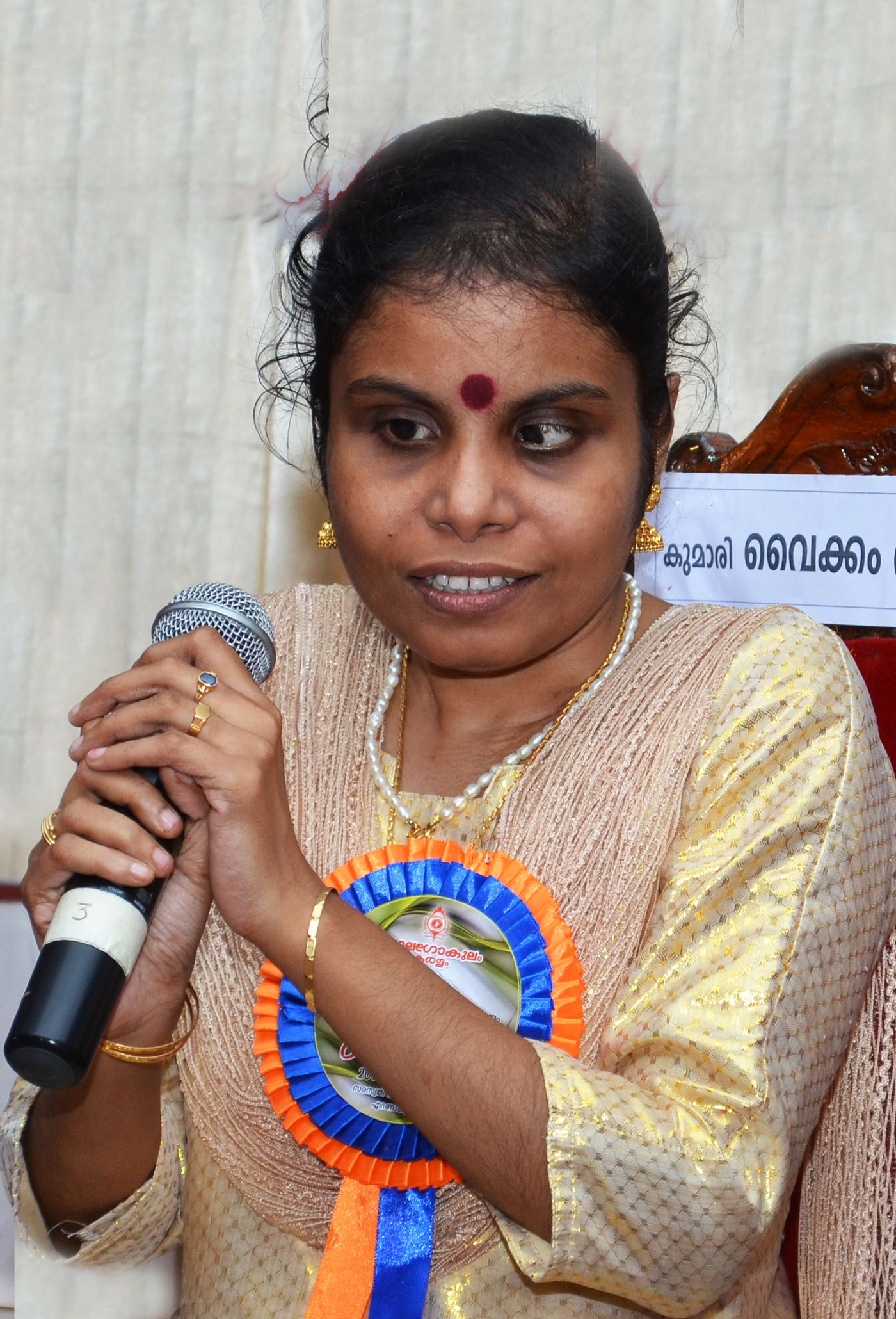
- The 2024 recipient: Vaikom Vijayalakshmi
- Awarded for: Best Vocal Performance by a Female Playback Singer
- Sponsored by: National Film Development Corporation of India
- Rewards: Rajat Kamal (Silver Lotus); ₹2,00,000
- First award: 1968
- Most recent winner: Vaikom Vijayalakshmi, ARM (2024)

Highlights
- Most wins: K. S. Chithra (6)

The National Film Award for Best Female Playback Singer is an honour presented annually at the National Film Awards of India since 1968 to a female playback singer for the best renditions of songs from films within the Indian film industry. The National Film Awards were called the "State Awards for Films" when established in 1954. The State Awards instituted the "Best Female Playback Singer" category in 1968. Throughout the years, accounting for ties and repeat winners, the Government of India has presented a total of 55 Best Female Playback Singer awards to 33 different female playback singers.

Until 1974, winners of the National Film Award in this category received a commemorative plaque and certificate; since 1975, they have been awarded with a "Rajat Kamal" (silver lotus), certificate and a cash prize that amounted to ₹50,000 (US$530) in 2012, and ₹2 lakh (US$2,100) in 2022. Although the Indian film industry produces films in more than 20 languages and dialects, the female playback singers who have received the 'Rajat Kamal' awards have recorded their renditions in nine major languages: Tamil (fifteen awards), Hindi (fifteen awards), Telugu (six awards), Marathi (six awards), Bengali (six awards), Malayalam (six awards), Kannada (one award), Assamese (one award) and Konkani (one award).

The first recipient was P. Susheela, who was honoured at the 16th National Film Awards in 1968 for her rendition from the Tamil film Uyarntha Manithan. As of 2021, The female playback singer who won the most 'Rajat Kamal' awards is K. S. Chithra with six wins, followed by P. Susheela and Shreya Ghoshal with five wins each. S. Janaki won the award four times. Two female playback singers — Lata Mangeshkar and Vani Jairam have won it thrice, while three female playback singers — Asha Bhosle, Alka Yagnik and Arati Ankalikar Tikekar have won it twice. Shreya Ghoshal won the award for her renditions in five different languages, followed by S. Janaki and K. S. Chithra, both of whom won for their renditions in three different languages. Sandhya Mukhopadhyay and Shreya Ghoshal are the only recipients who received the award for two renditions from two different films in the same year, with Ghoshal being the only recipient who received the award for two renditions from two different films in two different languages. K. S. Chithra and Roopa Ganguly are the only recipients who received the award for two renditions from the same film in the same year. Vani Jairam and Lata Mangeshkar are the only recipients who received the award for their various renditions in a single film in the same year. As of 2022, Uthara Unnikrishnan is the youngest recipient who received the award at the age of ten, and Nanjamma is the oldest recipient who received the award at the age of sixty-two. The only siblings who have received the award are Lata Mangeshkar and Asha Bhosle. No award was given in this category at the 21st National Film Awards in 1973. The most recent recipient of the award is Vaikom Vijayalakshmi who was honoured at the 72nd National Film Awards for the song "Angu Vaana Konilu" from the Malayalam film ARM.

== Key ==
Symbol	Meaning
Year	Indicates the year in which the film was censored by the Central Board of Film Certification (CBFC)
†	Indicates a joint award for that year
‡	Indicates that the winner won the award for two renditions from the same or two different films in that year
⸸	Indicates that the winner won the award for various renditions in that year

== Superlatives ==
Winners	Number of wins	Years
K. S. Chithra	6	1985, 1986, 1988, 1996, 1997, 2004
P. Susheela	5	1968, 1971, 1976, 1982, 1983
Shreya Ghoshal	5	2002, 2005, 2007, 2008, 2021
S. Janaki	4	1977, 1980, 1984, 1992

== Recipients ==
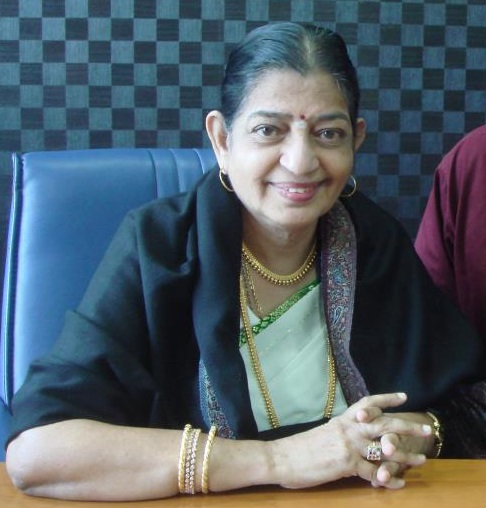
P. Susheela has won the award five times. She is the first-ever recipient of the award.

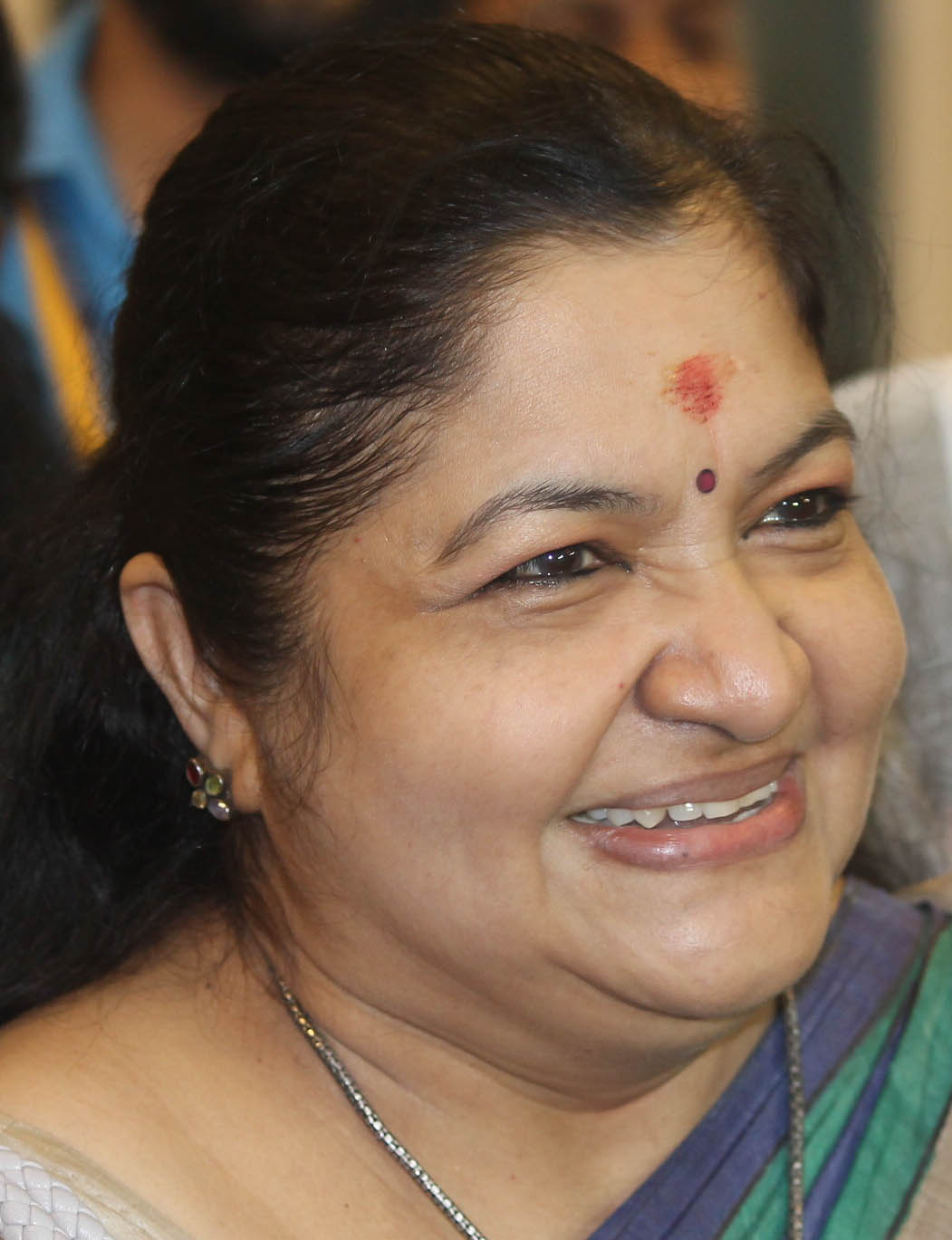
With six wins in three different languages, K. S. Chithra is the most awarded recipient in this category.

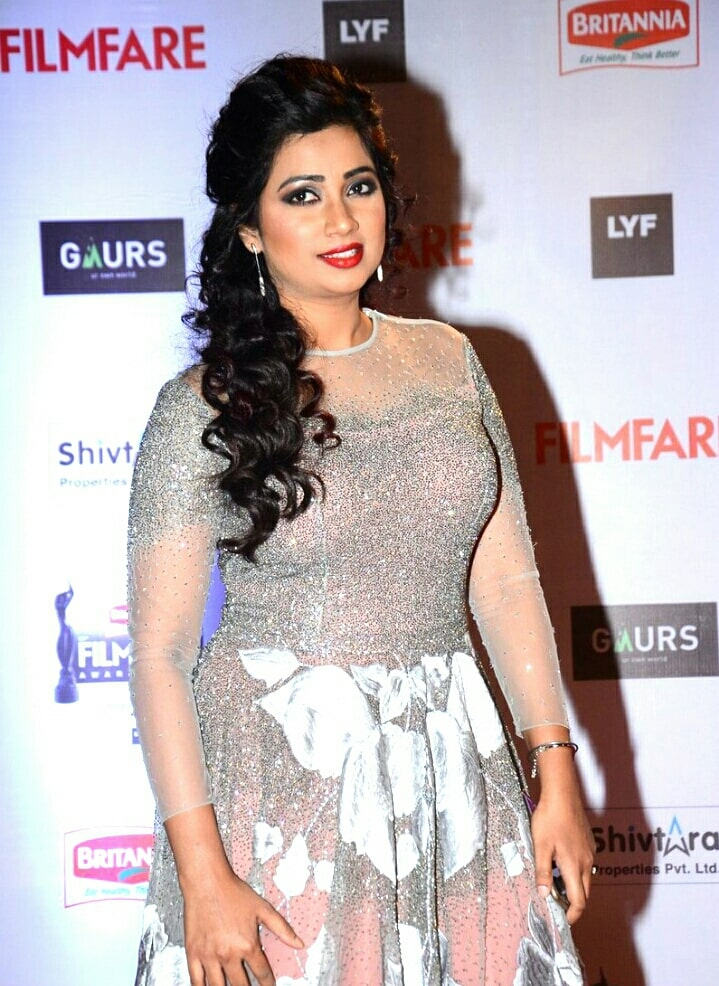
Shreya Ghoshal has won the award five times in five different languages. She is the only recipient to be honoured for two renditions from two different films of different languages in a same year.

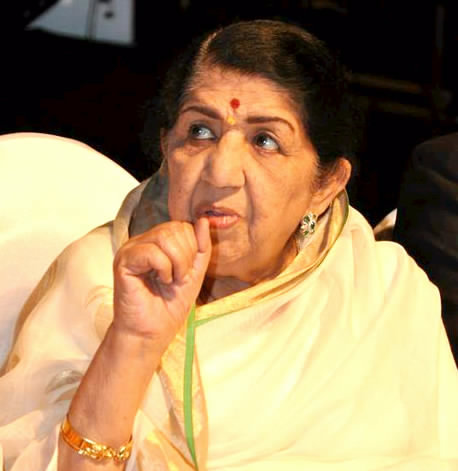
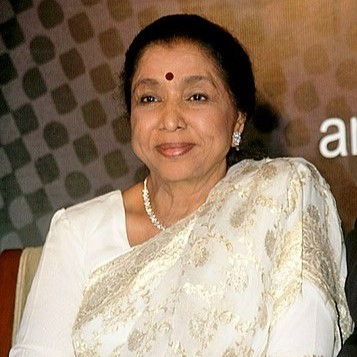
Lata Mangeshkar (left) has won the award thrice and Asha Bhosle (right) has won it twice. They are the only siblings to be honoured in this category.

List of award recipients, showing the year, song(s), film(s) and language(s)
Year (Note: Denotes The year in which the film was censored by the Central Board of Film Certification.)	Recipient(s)	Song(s)	Film(s)	Language(s)	Refs.
1968 (16th)	P. Susheela	"Paal Polave"	Uyarndha Manithan	Tamil	
1969 (17th)	K. B. Sundarambal	"Pazhanimalai Meethile"	Thunaivan	Tamil	
1970 (18th) ‡	Sandhya Mukhopadhyay	"Amader Chhuti Chhuti"	Jay Jayanti (Note: Mukhopadhyay was awarded for two songs from two different films.)	Bengali	
1970 (18th) ‡	Sandhya Mukhopadhyay	"Ore Sakol Sona Molin Holo"	Nishi Padma	Bengali	
1971 (19th)	P. Susheela	"Chittukuruvikkena Kattupaadu"	Savaale Samali	Tamil	
1972 (20th)	Lata Mangeshkar	"Beeti Naa Bitaai Raina"	Parichay	Hindi	
1973 (21st)	No awards				
1974 (22nd)	Lata Mangeshkar	"Roothe Roothe Piya"	Kora Kagaz	Hindi	
1975 (23rd)	Vani Jairam	"Yezhu Swarangalukkul"	Apoorva Raagangal	Tamil	
1976 (24th)	P. Susheela	"Jhummandi Naadham"	Siri Siri Muvva	Telugu	
1977 (25th)	S. Janaki	"Senthoora Poove"	16 Vayathinile	Tamil	
1978 (26th)	Chhaya Ganguly	"Aap Ki Yaad Aati Rahi Raat Bhar"	Gaman	Hindi	
1979 (27th) ⸸	Vani Jairam	– (Note: Jairam was awarded for her various renditions in the film Sankarabharanam.)	Sankarabharanam	Telugu	
1980 (28th)	S. Janaki	"Ettumanoor Ambalathil Ezhunnallathu"	Oppol	Malayalam	
1981 (29th)	Asha Bhosle	"Dil Cheez Kya Hai"	Umrao Jaan	Hindi	
1982 (30th)	P. Susheela	"Priye Charusheele"	Meghasandesam	Telugu	
1983 (31st)	P. Susheela	"Entho Beeda Vaade Gopaludu"	M. L. A. Yedukondalu	Telugu	
1984 (32nd)	S. Janaki	"Vennello Godhari"	Sitaara	Telugu	
1985 (33rd) ‡	K. S. Chithra	"Paadariyen"	Sindhu Bhairavi (Note: K. S. Chithra was awarded for two different songs in the same film.)	Tamil	
1985 (33rd) ‡	K. S. Chithra	"Naan Oru Sindhu"	Sindhu Bhairavi	Tamil	
1986 (34th)	K. S. Chithra	"Manjal Prasadavum"	Nakhakshathangal	Malayalam	
1987 (35th)	Asha Bhosle	"Mera Kuchh Saamaan"	Ijaazat	Hindi	
1988 (36th)	K. S. Chithra	"Indupushpam Choodi Nilkum"	Vaishali	Malayalam	
1989 (37th)	Anuradha Paudwal	"He Ek Reshami Gharate"	Kalat Nakalat	Marathi	
1990 (38th)	Lata Mangeshkar	"Yaara Seeli Seeli"	Lekin...	Hindi	
1991 (39th)	Vani Jairam	"Aanati Neeyaraa"	Swathi Kiranam	Telugu	
1992 (40th)	S. Janaki	"Inji Iduppazhagi"	Thevar Magan	Tamil	
1993 (41st)	Alka Yagnik	"Ghoonghat Ki Aad Se"	Hum Hain Rahi Pyar Ke	Hindi	
1994 (42nd)	Swarnalatha	"Porale Ponnuthaaye"	Karuththamma	Tamil	
1995 (43rd)	Anjali Marathe	"Bhui Bhegalali Khol"	Doghi	Marathi	
1996 (44th)	K. S. Chithra	"Mana Madurai"	Minsara Kanavu	Tamil	
1997 (45th)	K. S. Chithra	"Paayalein Chhun Mun"	Virasat	Hindi	
1998 (46th)	Alka Yagnik	"Kuch Kuch Hota Hai"	Kuch Kuch Hota Hai	Hindi	
1999 (47th)	Jayshree Dasgupta	"Hriday Amar Prokash Holo"	Paromitar Ek Din	Bengali	
2000 (48th)	Bhavatharini Ilaiyaraaja	"Mayil Pola Ponnu Onnu"	Bharathi	Tamil	
2001 (49th)	Sadhana Sargam	"Pattu Cholli"	Azhagi	Tamil	
2002 (50th)	Shreya Ghoshal	"Bairi Piya"	Devdas	Hindi	
2003 (51st)	Tarali Sarma	"Kimote Bhokoti"	Akashitorar Kothare	Assamese	
2004 (52nd)	K. S. Chithra	"Ovvoru Pookalume"	Autograph	Tamil	
2005 (53rd)	Shreya Ghoshal	"Dheere Jalna"	Paheli	Hindi	
2006 (54th)	Arati Ankalikar-Tikekar	–	Antarnad	Konkani	
2007 (55th)	Shreya Ghoshal	"Yeh Ishq Haaye"	Jab We Met	Hindi	
2008 (56th) ‡	Shreya Ghoshal	"Pherari Mon"	Antaheen (Note: Ghoshal was awarded for two songs from two different films in two different languages.)	Bengali	
2008 (56th) ‡	Shreya Ghoshal	"Jeev Dangla Gungla Rangla Asa"	Jogwa	Marathi	
2009 (57th)	Nilanjana Sarkar	"Boye Jay Sudhu Bish"	Houseful	Bengali	
2010 (58th)	Rekha Bhardwaj	"Badi Dheere Jali"	Ishqiya	Hindi	
2011 (59th) ‡	Roopa Ganguly	"Dure Kothao Dure Dure"	Abosheshey (Note: Ganguly was awarded for two different songs in the same film.)	Bengali	
2011 (59th) ‡	Roopa Ganguly	"Aaji Bijan Ghare"	Abosheshey	Bengali	
2012 (60th)	Arati Ankalikar-Tikekar	"Palakein Naa Moondon"	Samhita	Marathi	
2013 (61st)	Bela Shende	"Khurkhura"	Tuhya Dharma Koncha	Marathi	
2014 (62nd)	Uthara Unnikrishnan	"Azhagu" (Note: Unnikrishnan is the youngest recipient of the award who won at age of 10.)	Saivam	Tamil	
2015 (63rd)	Monali Thakur	"Moh Moh Ke Dhage"	Dum Laga Ke Haisha	Hindi	
2016 (64th)	Iman Chakraborty	"Tumi Jaake Bhalobasho"	Praktan	Bengali	
2017 (65th)	Shashaa Tirupati	"Vaan Varuvaan"	Kaatru Veliyidai	Tamil	
2018 (66th)	Bindhu Malini	"Mayavi Manave"	Nathicharami	Kannada	
2019 (67th)	Savani Ravindra	"Raan Petala"	Bardo	Marathi	
2020 (68th)	Nanjamma	"Kalakkatha" (Note: Nanjamma is the oldest recipient of the award who won at age of 62.)	Ayyappanum Koshiyum	Malayalam	
2021 (69th)	Shreya Ghoshal	"Maayava Chaayava"	Iravin Nizhal	Telugu/Tamil (Note: Ghoshal was awarded for a bilingual song.)	
2022 (70th)	Bombay Jayashri	"Chaayum Veyil"	Saudi Vellakka	Malayalam	
2023 (71st)	Shilpa Rao	"Chaleya"	Jawan	Hindi	
2024 (72nd)	Vaikom Vijayalakshmi	"Angu Vaana Konilu"	Ajayante Randam Moshanam	Malayalam	

== See also ==
- List of Indian female playback singers
