= Umrao Jaan (1981 film) =

1981 Indian film by Muzaffar Ali

- Theatrical release poster
- Directed by: Muzaffar Ali
- Written by: Muzaffar Ali; Javed Siddiqui; Shama Zaidi
- Based on: Umrao Jaan Ada by Mirza Hadi Ruswa
- Produced by: Muzaffar Ali
- Starring: Rekha
- Cinematography: Pravin Bhatt
- Edited by: B. Prasad
- Music by: Mohammed Zahur Khayyam
- Production companies: Integrated Films; S. K. Jain & Sons
- Release date: 2 January 1981
- Running time: 145 minutes
- Language: Urdu
- Budget: ₹50 lakh

Umrao Jaan is a 1981 Indian period musical drama film directed by Muzaffar Ali and starring Rekha as the title character. Based on Mirza Hadi Ruswa's 1899 Urdu novel Umrao Jaan Ada, the film tells the story of a Lucknow tawaif and poet, and her rise to fame.

Umrao Jaan won many accolades. At 29th National Film Awards, it won 4 awards, including Best Actress (Rekha). It was also nominated for 3 Filmfare Awards, winning Best Director (Ali) and Best Music Director (Khayyam).

== Plot ==
In 1840s Faizabad, a betrothed teenager named Amiran is kidnapped by her criminal neighbour Dilawar, in an act of revenge against Amiran's daroga father, who had testified against Dilawar. Dilawar sells Amiran to Khanum Jaan, the madam of a kotha (brothel) in Lucknow, who teaches young tawaifs (courtesans). At the kotha, Amiran is given the name Umrao Jaan. Years later, Umrao has grown up and became an accomplished poet, and as well as an extraordinary tawaif.

The young Nawab Sultan is smitten by Umrao's beauty and poetry, and the two fall in love. However, Nawab reveals that he must marry someone else to please his family, leaving behind a heartbroken Umrao. Umrao seeks solace in the arms of Faiz Ali and elopes with him, only to discover that he is a wanted bandit. On the way, Ali is killed by the local police.

Umrao relocates to Kanpur, where she establishes herself as a poet and tawaif, but is brought back to Khanum by her kotha keepers, Gohar Mirza and Husseini. Later, she meets the Begum of Kanpur and discovers that she is actually Ram Dai, whom Dilawar had abducted alongside Amiran years ago. In a strange twist of fate, Ram Dai was sold to the mother of Nawab Sultan and she ends up marrying him.

British forces lay siege to Lucknow and the residents evacuate the city. Umrao & Khanum's household of refugees stops in a small village, which Umrao recognises as Faizabad, her hometown. However, The residents don't recognise her and ask her to perform for them.

Afterwards, Umrao goes to her childhood home where her mother is happy to welcome her back, but her younger brother forbids it and humiliates her. He thinks her being a tawaif is a disgrace, and that she is better off dead, ordering her to leave. Devastated, Umrao Jaan returns to Lucknow once the mutiny is over and finds her kotha looted and deserted.

== Cast ==
- Rekha as Amiran/Umrao Jaan
  - Seema Sathyu and Umme Farwa as young Amiran
- Farooq Shaikh as Nawab Sultan
- Naseeruddin Shah as Gohar Mirza
- Raj Babbar as Faiz Ali
- Ishtiaque Khan as Khan Ghilzai
- Gajanan Jagirdar as Maulvi Saheb
- Shaukat Kaifi as Khanum Jaan
- Dina Pathak as Husseini
- Prema Narayan as Bismillah Jaan
- Bharat Bhushan Bhalla as Khan Saheb
- Mukri as Parnan Aziz
- Satish Shah as Daroga Dilawar

== Release and reception ==
According to author Anitaa Padhye's Ten Classics (English), Umrao Jaan was released theatrically on 2 January 1981.

It will be presented in the Red Sea: Treasure strand at the Jeddah's Red Sea International Film Festival on 7 December 2025. The protagonist of the film Rekha along with the director Muzaffar Ali will attend the festival for special screening of freshly restored film. It will be shown for the first time outside of India.

Rekha was widely praised for her acting, and won the National Film Award for her portrayal of the central character. The film's box office returns were average. The supporting characters were played by Naseeruddin Shah, Farooq Shaikh, Raj Babbar and Bharat Bhushan. Critics responded favourably to the carefully done historical setting.

The soundtrack was composed by Khayyam and the lyrics were penned by Shahryar. Several songs from the film, sung by Asha Bhosle, are considered classics of filmi music: "Dil Cheez Kya Hai", "Justuju Jiski Thi", "In Ankhon Ki Masti Ke", and "Yeh Kya Jagah Hai Doston". Today, Umrao Jaan is considered at par with other cult classics such as Pakeezah (1972) and is widely acclaimed as one of India's great cinematic magnum opuses.

== Soundtrack ==
The music of the film was composed by Khayyam, while the lyrics were penned by Shahryar.

No.	Title	Lyrics	Singer(s)	Length
1.	"Dil Cheez Kya Hai (Raga Bihag)"	Shahryar	Asha Bhosle	6:06
2.	"In Ankhon Ki Masti Ke (Raga Bhupali)"	Shahryar	Asha Bhosle	5:42
3.	"Jab Bhi Milti Hai"	Shahryar	Asha Bhosle	1:28
4.	"Jhoola Kinne Dala"	Shahryar	Ustad Ghulam Mustafa Khan, Shahida Khan Nizami	2:31
5.	"Justuju Jiski Thi"	Shahryar	Asha Bhosle	4:37
6.	"Kahe Ko Byahi Bides"	Amir Khusrow	Jagjit Kaur	4:52
7.	"Raagmala"	Shahryar	Ustad Ghulam Mustafa Khan, Runa Prasad, Shahida Khan	5:22
8.	"Yeh Kya Jagah Hai Doston (Raga Bihag)"	Shahryar	Asha Bhosle	6:07
9.	"Zindagi Jab Bhi (Raga Gaud Sarang)"	Shahryar	Talat Aziz	4:51
10.	"Pratham Dhar Dhyan"		Ustad Ghulam Mustafa Khan

== Accolades ==
Award	Category	Recipient(s) and nominee(s)	Result	Ref.
29th National Film Awards	Best Actress	Rekha	Won	
29th National Film Awards	Best Music Direction	Mohammed Zahur Khayyam	Won	
29th National Film Awards	Best Female Playback Singer	Asha Bhosle for "Dil Cheez Kya Hai"	Won	
29th National Film Awards	Best Art Direction	Manzur	Won	
29th Filmfare Awards	Best Director	Muzaffar Ali	Won	
29th Filmfare Awards	Best Actress	Rekha	Nominated	
29th Filmfare Awards	Best Music Director	Mohammed Zahur Khayyam	Won	

== Musical ==
Salim–Sulaiman adapted the film into a musical play, Umrao Jaan Ada - The Musical, in 2019. The theatrical adaptation was directed by Rajeev Goswami with Pratibha Baghel in the titular role of the tawaif.
