= Zooni =

Unreleased Indian film

- Dimple Kapadia at Zooni location
- Directed by: Muzaffar Ali
- Starring: Vinod Khanna; Dimple Kapadia
- Music by: Khayyam
- Country: India
- Language: Hindi

Zooni is an unreleased Indian Hindi-language film directed by Muzaffar Ali, starring Vinod Khanna and Dimple Kapadia. The film was in production from 1988 and was expected to be released in 1990. A film restoration undertaking was announced in 2024.

== Plot ==
Zooni is a period film revolving around the sixteenth century Kashmiri poet Habba Khatoon (1554–1609 CE; also known as Zooni), queen of Yusuf Shah Chak, the ruler of Kashmir. After he was arrested by Mughal emperor Akbar and banished to Bihar, he remained to be the last ruler of Kashmir.

== Cast ==
- Dimple Kapadia as Zooni (Habba Khatoon)
- Vinod Khanna as Yusuf Shah Chak

== Music ==
All songs were written by Shahryar.

- "Allah Khair Allah Khair Maango Sab Ki" - Asha Bhosle, Jaywant Kulkarni, Sunil Kumar, Bhushan Mehta
- "Allah Khair Allah Khair Maango Sab Ki" (Female) - Asha Bhosle
- "Jeene Ki Koi Raah Dikhayi" - Asha Bhosle
- "Nazar Mein Noor Ki Shamma Jali" - Asha Bhosle
- "Rookh-E-Dildar Deedam Daras Ko" - Asha Bhosle
- "Shah-E-Mardaan Sher-e-Yajdaan" - Asha Bhosle
- "Tere Bin Yeh Jeevan Kya Hai" - Asha Bhosle
- "Yeh Shamme Yeh Savere Jo Hain" - Asha Bhosle
- "Husn Shaan-E-Dilbaran Ishq" - Anuradha Paudwal
- "Jheel Ke Aaine Mein Phir Mujhko" - Anwar

== Rediscovery and restoration ==
A film restoration work was announced in 2024.
