= Selma Hanımsultan =

Ottoman princess, daughter of Rauf Hayri Bey and Hatice Sultan

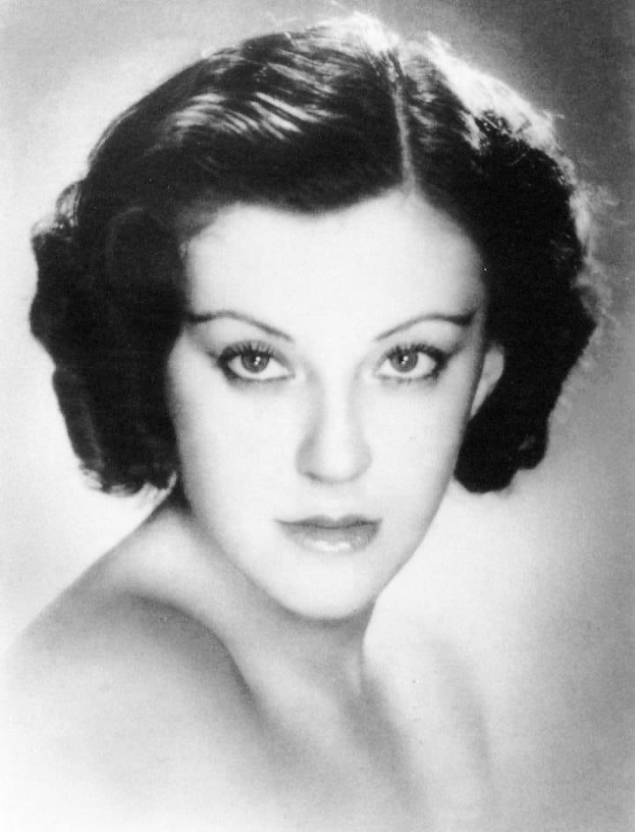
- Born: 13 April 1916; Ortaköy Villa, Istanbul, Ottoman Empire (now Istanbul, Turkey)
- Died: 13 January 1942 (aged 25); Paris, Nazi-occupied France
- Burial: Bobigny cemetery
- Spouse: Syed Sajid Husain Ali (m. 1937)
- Issue: Kenizé Mourad
Names
- Turkish: Selma Hanımsultan; Ottoman Turkish: سلمه خانم سلطان
- Father: Rauf Hayri Bey
- Mother: Hatice Sultan
- Religion: Sunni Islam

Selma Hanımsultan (Ottoman Turkish: سلمه خانم سلطان; 13 April 1916 – 13 January 1942) was an Ottoman princess, the daughter of Rauf Hayri Bey and Hatice Sultan.

== Early life ==
Selma Hanımsultan was born on 13 April 1916 in her mother's villa in Ortaköy. Her father was Rauf Hayri Bey (1871 – 1936), son of Hayri Bey and Belkis Hanım, and her mother was Hatice Sultan (1870 – 1938), daughter of Sultan Murad V and Şayan Kadın.

Upon the exile of the imperial family in March 1924, Selma and her family settled in Beirut, Lebanon. Her parents had divorced in 1918, and in exile they lived on the alimony sent by her father. However, when he was implicated in a smuggling plot, dismissed from his job and put in prison, they were left with no money. Despite the family's limited means, she blossomed into a fashionable young woman.

== Marriage ==
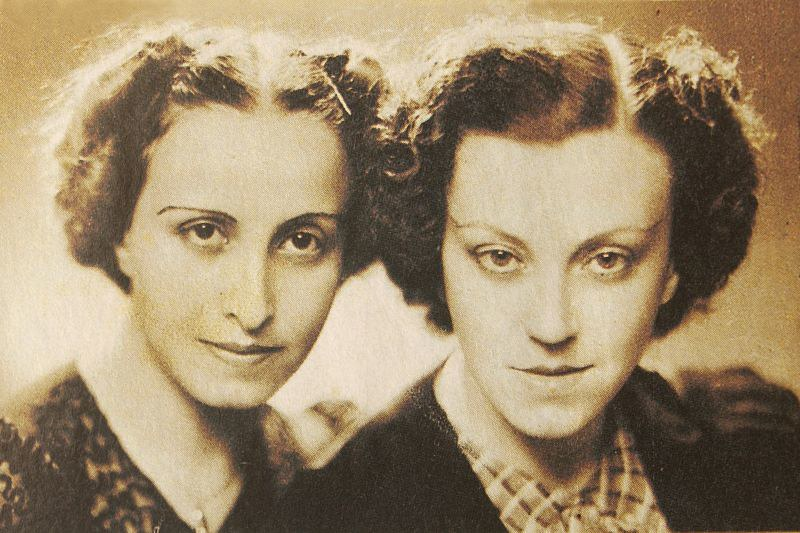
Selma (right) with her mother

In 1932, a double match was made for Dürrüşehvar Sultan and Nilufer Hanımsultan, two princesses of the Ottoman family living in France. The Nizam of Hyderabad, at the time considered the richest man in the world, had won their hand in marriage for his two sons. After a simple wedding in the South of France, the two brides went off to live in India. In her straitened circumstances, Hatice was under a lot of pressure to get her daughter married, the sooner the better. But it had become very hard to find suitable marriage partners for impoverished Turkish royalty. About five years later, a husband for Selma was found in India. Selma traveled to India to marry Syed Sajid Husain Ali, Raja of Kotwara, in 1937. In India, Selma took the title of Princess Selma, Rani of Kotwara and Princess of the Ottoman Empire. However, after growing up first in the splendor of imperial Istanbul and then in cosmopolitan Beirut, Selma had great trouble adjusting to her new environment. The marriage was not a happy one. In the summer of 1939, pregnant with her first child, Selma traveled to Paris under the pretext of the upcoming royal delivery. She was accompanied only by a faithful retainer of her birth family, a eunuch named Zeynel Agha, who had come to India with her. With the Second World War fast approaching, she ran out of money. Her daughter Kenizé was born on 11 November of that year. Selma did not inform her husband of the successful delivery, leading her in-laws to believe the child was stillborn.

== Death ==
In 1942, World War II was raging. Cut off from all resources, Selma lived in dire poverty. That winter, she became very ill and eventually succumbed to sepsis on 13 January 1942. She was buried in the Bobigny cemetery, Paris.

== Issue ==
Name	Birth	Notes
Kenizé Mourad	11 November 1939	Born in Paris, France; unmarried and without issue

== Ancestry ==
Ancestors of Selma Hanımsultan

4. Hayri Bey
2. Rauf Hayri Bey
5. Belkis Hanım
1. Selma Hanımsultan
12. Abdulmejid I
6. Murad V
13. Şevkefza Sultan
3. Hatice Sultan
14. Zan Batir Bey
7. Şayan Kadın
