= Muzaffar Ali =

Indian film producer (born 1944)

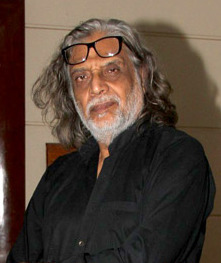
- Born: 21 October 1944 (age 82); Lucknow, United Provinces, British India
- Education: Aligarh Muslim University
- Title: Padma Shri (2005)
- Spouses: Geeti Sen (divorced); Subhashini Ali (estranged); Meera Ali
- Children: 3
- Relatives: Kenizé Mourad (half-sister); Selma Hanımsultan (Stepmother); Kaniz Wajid Khan (aunt)

Muzaffar Ali (born 21 October 1944) is an Indian filmmaker, fashion designer, poet, artist, cultural revivalist, and social worker.

== Biography ==
Raja Muzaffar was born in Lucknow of the erstwhile United Provinces, British India, in 1944. The eldest son of Raja Syed Sajid Husain Ali, then-ruling prince of the principality of Kotwara in Gola Gokaran Nath, Muzaffar attended La Martiniere, Lucknow, and graduated in science from Aligarh Muslim University. He worked in advertising before turning to film making. His early directorial films are Gaman (1978) and Umrao Jaan (1981). He also directed and starred in the TV series Jaan-e-Alam.

== Personal life ==
Muzaffar Ali is currently married to Meera Ali, an architect and fashion designer, with whom he has a daughter Sama, who is also a fashion designer. He later became a fashion designer, creating a fashion label with Meera in 1990.

He was earlier married to the art historian Geeti Sen, with whom he has a son Murad Ali, a film actor. He is estranged from his second wife, communist politician Subhashini Ali, with whom he has a son Shaad Ali, also a film director.

== Directorial filmography ==
Year	Title	Director	Writer	Producer	Notes
1978	Gaman	Yes	Yes	Yes	
1981	Umrao Jaan	Yes	Yes	Yes	
1982	Aagaman	Yes	No	No	
1986	Anjuman	Yes	Yes	Yes	
2015	Jaanisaar	Yes	Yes	No	
—N/a	Zooni	Yes	No	Yes	Unreleased

== Awards ==
- Padma Shri (2005)
- National Film Award – Special Mention (feature film) - Gaman (1978)
- Filmfare Award for Best Director - Umrao Jaan (1981)
