= Mirza Hadi Ruswa =

Urdu poet and writer

- Born: 1857
- Died: 21 October 1931
- Language: Urdu

Mirza Muhammad Hadi Ruswa (1857 – 21 October 1931) was an Indian Urdu poet and writer of fiction, plays, and treatises (mainly on religion, philosophy, and astronomy). He served on the Nawab of Awadh's advisory board on language matters for many years. He spoke many languages including Urdu, Greek, and English.

His famed Urdu novel, Umrao Jan Ada, published in 1905, is considered by many as the first Urdu novel. It is based on the life of a renowned Lucknow tawaif and poet of the same name.

== Life ==
In 1857, Ruswa was born at Lucknow, India. After completing his education at Thomson Engineering School, Ruswa spent the majority of his career in education. Apart from his teaching positions, Ruswa worked as a civil servant and a railroad worker. On 21 October 1931, Ruswa died in Osmania.

== Writing career ==
In 1887, Ruswa began his literary career with a poetry adaption of Laila-Majnu. During the early 1900s, Ruswa released Afshai Raz and Umrao Jan Ada. Following Zaat-e-Shareef and Shareef Zada, Ruswa also released Akhtari Begum. Apart from poems, Ruswa wrote penny dreadfuls and religious works about Shia.

== Bibliography ==
- Umrao Jaan Ada, 2003, Publisher: Sang-e-Meel. ISBN 969-35-0674-X.
