= Karan Kapoor =

Indian photographer and actor

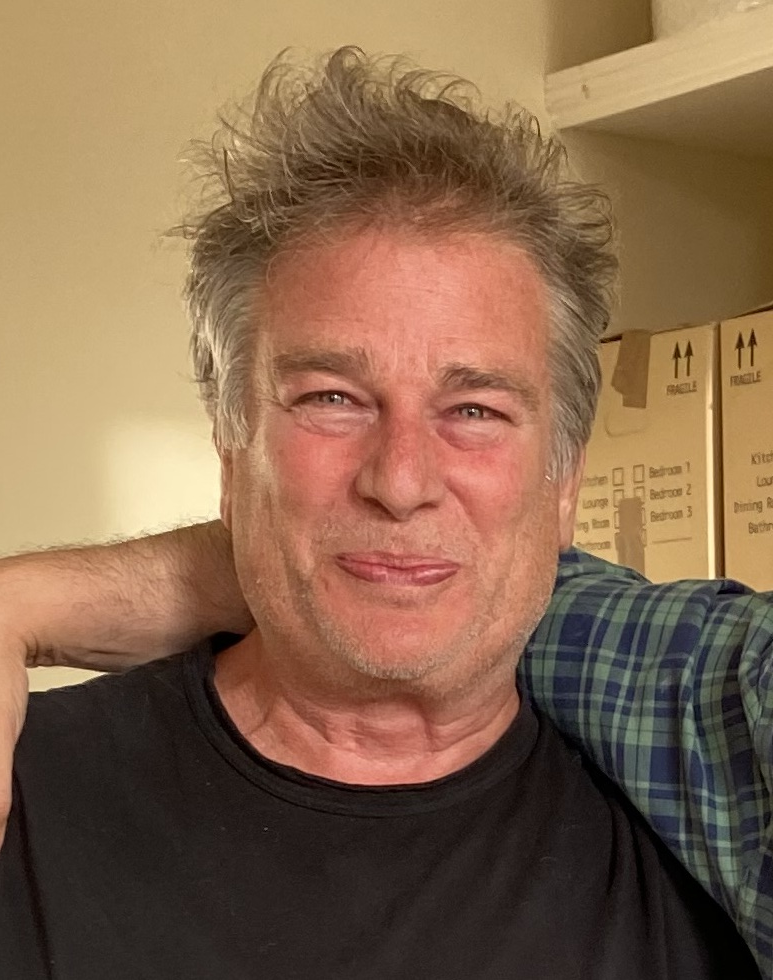
- Kapoor in 2020
- Born: 18 January 1962 (age 64); Mumbai, Maharashtra, India
- Occupations: Actor; photographer; model; businessman
- Years active: 1978–present
- Spouse: Lorna Kapoor
- Children: 2
- Parent(s): Shashi Kapoor; Jennifer Kendal
- Relatives: See Kapoor family

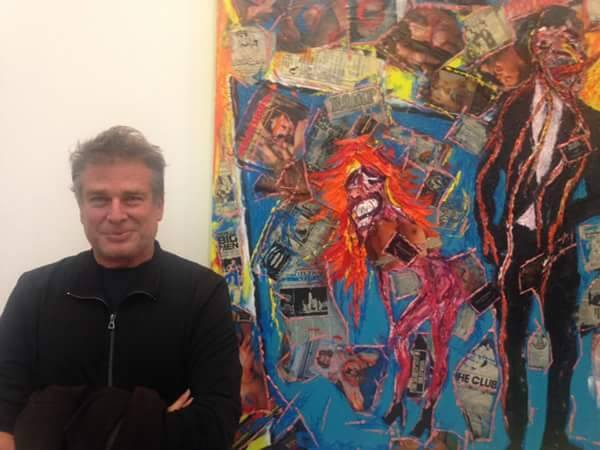
Karan Kapoor at a private gallery exhibition in Chelsea.

Karan Kapoor (born 18 January 1962) is an Indian photographer, actor and model. He is the son of actors Shashi Kapoor and Jennifer Kendal. His paternal grandfather was Prithviraj Kapoor and his paternal uncles were Raj Kapoor and Shammi Kapoor. His elder brother Kunal Kapoor and younger sister Sanjana Kapoor have also acted in some films. His maternal grandparents, Geoffrey Kendal and Laura Kendal, were actors who toured India and Asia with their theatre group, Shakespearana, performing Shakespeare and Shaw. The Merchant Ivory film, Shakespeare Wallah, was loosely based on the family, which starred his father and his maternal aunt, actress Felicity Kendal.

== Biography ==
Karan Kapoor was born on 18 January 1962 to actor Shashi Kapoor and British theatre actress Jennifer Kendal.

Kapoor has two siblings. His brother Kunal Kapoor formerly acted in Bollywood movies and now runs ad company Adfilms Valas. Kunal was married to filmmaker Ramesh Sippy's daughter Sheena, who is a well known photographer. They have two children, Shaira and Zahan. Kunal and Sheena are now divorced.

His sister Sanjana Kapoor ran the Prithvi Theatre in Mumbai from 1993 to February 2012.

== Personal life ==
He married English model Lorna Tarling Kapoor; the couple have since separated. They have a daughter and a son.

== Career ==
Early in his career he was a popular model made famous by the Bombay Dyeing advertisement campaign.

He made his debut in Shyam Benegal's critically acclaimed 1978 film Junoon, which also featured his parents and both siblings. He had a minor part in his father's production 36 Chowringhee Lane (1981). He appeared in the British television series The Jewel in the Crown in 1984.

Karan had a short presenting stint for the BBC's Asian magazine Network East in 1994.

He made his debut in mainstream Bollywood films with Sultanat (1986), alongside Dharmendra, Sunny Deol and Juhi Chawla. He later acted in Loha (1987) and Afsar in 1988, but did not have many offers as an actor. He also modeled major Indian brands, including Bombay Dyeing.

He has since become a photographer and lives in Chelsea, London, with his wife Lorna, daughter Aliya, and son Zack. Karan runs a photography company in the UK.

After a gap of nearly 25 years, Karan returned to public life and returned to India with a series of his photography exhibitions, Time & Tide. Karan's Time & Tide photography exhibition started in his home town Mumbai in November 2016 then taking place in Bangalore, Kolkata, New Delhi, Ahmedabad & Jaipur throughout 2017. Karan has done much research in the Anglo-Indian communities and travelled through various parts of India in the 1980s to meet these communities and has taken photographs. His articles were published in the BBC, Indian Express, Hindustan Times and other newspapers in November 2016. In his recent interview, Karan said that he is quite keen to do more photography projects in India, because his children have now grown up so he could spend more time in India. Karan also said that he was always interested in photography since his childhood even though being a part of very famous Bollywood family of Kapoors. Karan's elder brother Kunal Kapoor is now ad advertisement maker and younger sister Sanjana Kapoor runs the Junoon foundation to promote arts, culture and drama.

== Filmography ==
=== Actor ===
Year	Film	Role
1978	Junoon	
1981	36 Chowringhee Lane	Davie
1986	Sultanat	Samir
1987	Loha	Karan
1988	Afsar	

=== TV Series ===
- The Jewel in the Crown (1984 British TV Series on ITV) as Colin Lindsey
- South of the Border (1990 British TV Series) as Max Wilding
- The Tooting Lions (1993 British TV movie) as Kool
- BBC Network East (1994)

=== Still photographer ===
- The Bostonians (1984)
- Utsav (1984)

=== Miscellaneous Crew ===
- Vijeta (1982)

== Awards ==
His photograph "Old Couple" won at the International Photography Awards 2009 in the People/Lifestyle category. It was one of five nominations he received that year.
