= Zahan Kapoor =

Indian film actor (born 1992)

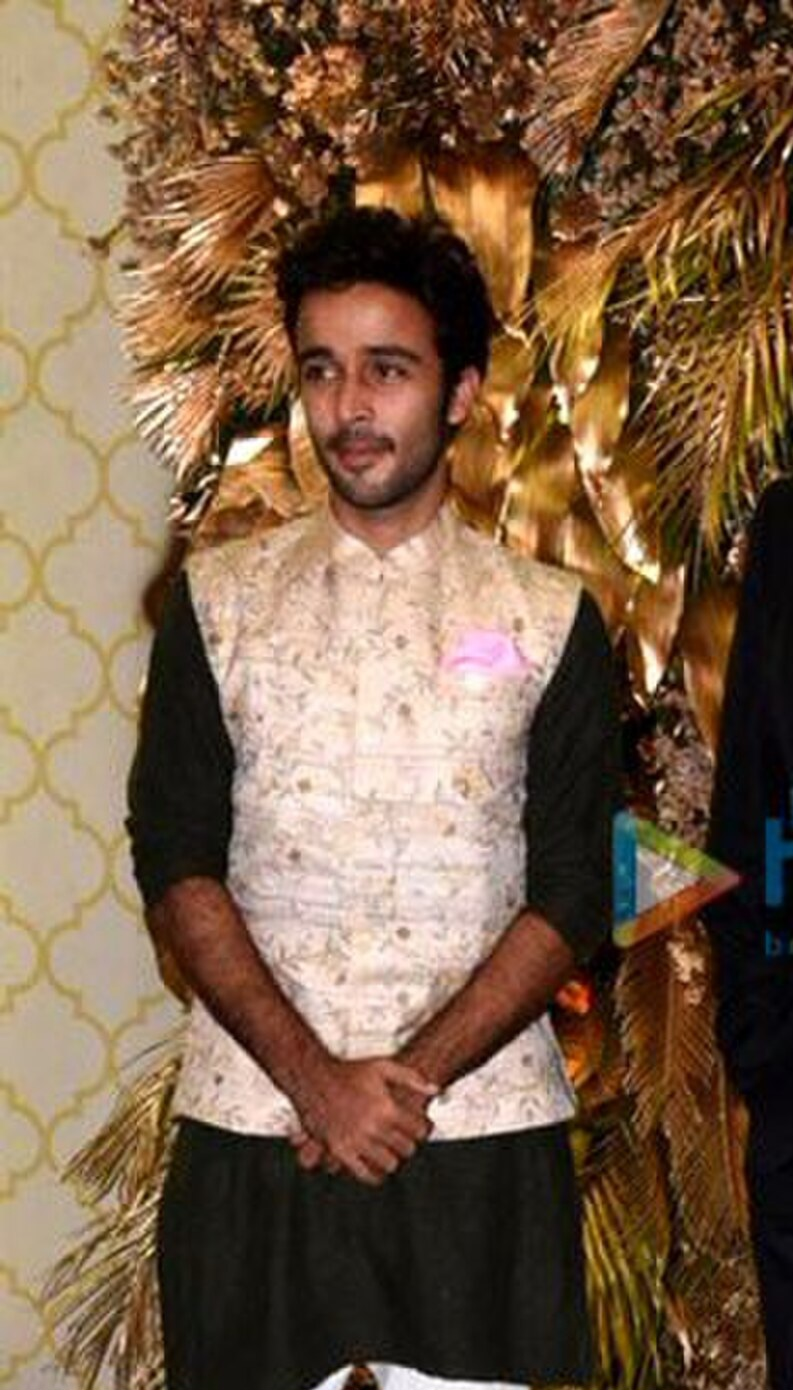
- Kapoor in 2020
- Born: 11 March 1992 (age 33); Mumbai, Maharashtra, India
- Occupation: Actor
- Father: Kunal Kapoor
- Family: Kapoor family

Zahan Prithviraj Kapoor (Hindi pronounced [zəˈɦəːɳ kəˈpuːɾ], born 11 March 1992) is an Indian actor who primarily works in Hindi films, series and theatre. A member of the Kapoor family, he is the son of actor Kunal Kapoor. He made his screen acting debut with the film Faraaz (2022) and has since starred in the thriller series Black Warrant (2025).

== Early life and background ==
Kapoor was born on 11 March 1992, in Mumbai, to the actor Kunal Kapoor and Sheena Sippy. He has a sister named Shaira Laura Kapoor, who works as a set designer. His paternal grandfather was the actor and film producer Shashi Kapoor, and his grandmother was English actress Jennifer Kendal. His great-grandfather on his paternal side are actors Prithviraj Kapoor and Geoffrey Kendal. His maternal grandfather is film director, actor, and producer Ramesh Sippy.

Kapoor has a diverse family circle as well. His uncles are Karan Kapoor and Rohan Sippy and his aunt is former actress Sanjana Kapoor. Among his first cousins are Aliya Kapoor, Zach Kapoor, and Hamir Thapar. Bollywood actors Karisma Kapoor, Kareena Kapoor, Ranbir Kapoor, Armaan Jain and Aadar Jain are his second cousins. His paternal grand-uncles were the actors Shammi Kapoor and Raj Kapoor whereas actors Randhir Kapoor, Rishi Kapoor and Rajiv Kapoor are his father's paternal cousins. Former actress Felicity Kendal is his grand-aunt.

Growing up in the Kapoor family, Zahan spent much of his time at Prithvi Theatre.

== Career ==
Kapoor's career started at the Prithvi Theatre, following in the footsteps of his grandfather Shashi Kapoor. He began his career by assisting theatre director Sunil Shanbag in a workshop for children. He even hosted performances for newcomers. In 2019, he made his theatre debut in Makarand Deshpande's play "Pitaji Please" at Prithvi Theatre. Zahan, alongside his sister Shaira, has been integral to the annual Prithvi Festival since 2012. During that period, he also took part in a podcast titled IVM Podcasts, where he shared the spotlight with his father, Kunal Kapoor. This endeavor took place before he debuted in Bollywood film industry with the film "Faraaz", directed by Hansal Mehta, in 2022.(2022). The film depicts the tragedy of the July 2016 Dhaka attack. Zahan also did a photo shoot for Elle Magazine with fashion designer Masaba Gupta.

After his film debut, Zahan returned to theatre in June 2023 with the play "Siachen", written by Aditya Rawal and directed by Makarand Deshpande, portraying the survival story of Indian soldiers stuck on the Siachen Glacier. He's also set to appear in the Amazon Prime Video web series "Janta Band", directed by Akshat Verma.

== Personal life ==
Kapoor, is a polo player, he secured victory in the ARC Challenge Cup as a part of his team, Benaz Corp in 2018.

== Filmography ==
Year	Film	Role	Ref(s)
2022	Faraaz	Faraaz Hossain	

=== Television ===
Year	TV series	Role	Notes	Ref(s)
2025	Black Warrant	Sunil Gupta		
2025	Yuva Sapno Ka Safar		Segment: Samudra	
2026	Bandwaale	DJ Psycho		

==== Theater ====
Year	Theater	Role	Ref(s)
2019	Pitaji Please	Cast	
2023	Siachen	Lead	

== See also ==
- Kapoor Family
