= 36 Chowringhee Lane =

- DVD cover
- Directed by: Aparna Sen
- Written by: Aparna Sen
- Produced by: Shashi Kapoor
- Starring: Jennifer Kendal; Debashree Roy; Dhritiman Chatterjee; Geoffrey Kendal
- Cinematography: Ashok Mehta
- Edited by: Bhanudas Divakar
- Music by: Vanraj Bhatia
- Release date: 29 August 1981
- Running time: 122 minutes
- Country: India
- Languages: Bengali; English

36 Chowringhee Lane is a 1981 film written and directed by Aparna Sen and produced by Shashi Kapoor. It marked the directorial debut of Sen, who had until then been known as a leading actress of Bengali cinema. The film was very well received upon release. It stars Jennifer Kendal in a critically acclaimed role, along with Dhritiman Chatterjee and Debashree Roy.Two major songs used in the film were 1960's song "Itsy Bitsy Teenie Weenie Yellow Polkadot Bikini" by Brian Hyland and 1964 version of "Silent Night" by Mary Martin.

== Plot ==
In post-independence India an Anglo-Indian teacher, Violet Stoneham (Jennifer Kendal), lives a quiet and uneventful life at 36 Chowringhee Lane in Calcutta, now Kolkata. Her brother Eddie (Geoffrey Kendal, Jennifer's father in real life) is senile and ailing in a nursing home. After the marriage of her niece Rosemary (Soni Razdan), she is alone except for her cat, Sir Toby. Her only joy in life is teaching Shakespeare, despite the lack of interest from her students.

Returning home from church on a Christmas Day, Violet runs into a former student, Nandita (Debashree Roy), and her author-boyfriend Samaresh (Dhritiman Chatterjee), and invites them over for coffee. They accept her invitation after some hesitation. However, they quickly realize that Violet's apartment would be convenient for their tête-à-têtes while she is at work. When Samaresh requests the use of Violet's apartment during school hours, saying he would like to work on his novel, she agrees. For some time, this arrangement works to the benefit of all. Samaresh and Nandita get the privacy they seek, and Violet has company when she returns home from work. Over time, she grows very fond of them, and begins to look upon them as friends. Her old friends die or go away, she isn't appreciated at her job, and they are the only friends she has.

Eventually Samaresh and Nandita get married, and move on with their lives. Violet wants to meet them on Christmas Day, and bake them a cake. They have a party organized at home, however, and think she would be 'a fish out of water' if invited. So they lie about not being in town during Christmas. Violet comes over anyway, to drop off the cake, and finally sees that she has been deceived by them. She walks home to her lonely life, slowly. The final scene shows Violet reciting aloud from King Lear, her only audience being a stray dog.

== Cast ==
- Jennifer Kendal as Violet Stoneham, the Anglo-Indian school teacher
- Debashree Roy as Nandita Roy, Violet's former student
- Dhritiman Chatterjee as Samaresh, Nandita's boyfriend
- Geoffrey Kendal as Eddie Stoneham
- Soni Razdan as Rosemary, Violet's niece
- Sanjana Kapoor as young Violet
- Karan Kapoor as Davie
- Ruma Guha Thakurta as Nandita's mother

== Production ==
Script and casting
The idea of the film emerged from a story Sen had written, and that had taken the shape of a screenplay. When she showed it to Satyajit Ray, he suggested she make the film. He also suggested Shashi Kapoor as the producer. After approaching several producers and repeatedly being asked what she was trying to sell, she finally sent a synopsis of the plot to Kapoor. He liked it and asked her to come over to Mumbai, and the film took off from there.

Aparna Sen had not thought of Jennifer Kendal to play the lead. She was looking for someone older, perhaps an Anglo-Indian. She was persuaded by Utpal Dutt to cast Kendal, who herself suggested the look of Violet Stoneham with her hair in a bun.

Shooting
Originally, Sen had thought of Govind Nihalani to shoot the film. However, he was not free, and she would have to wait a year to begin work on the film. Kapoor suggested several other cinematographers. Sen saw a film shot by Ashok Mehta, and decided she wanted him for her film.

The film was shot at almost a namesake address of 26, Chowringhee Road with a beautiful view of the Indian Museum and the Maidan along with its landmarks like the Eden Gardens, the High Court, Pratt Memorial School, Governor's House, the Shaheed Minar and Fort William.

The depiction of pre-marital sex in the film was ahead of its time. About the intimate scenes, Sen said: "I feel scenes of sexual intimacy are ruined if the director is embarrassed. I wasn't embarrassed. There was nothing in it that I thought was obscene."

Post-production
At the post-production stage, Debashree Roy's voice was dubbed over with Sen's own voice. Sen explained that this was done partly in order to save time. Moreover, Dhritiman Chatterjee was a good deal older than Roy, and she wanted a voice that was slightly older.

The art direction of the film was done by Bansi Chandragupta, art director of the Apu Trilogy and other Ray films. In June 1981, when the film was in the final stages of post-production, Chandragupta died of a heart attack. The film is dedicated to him.

Music
Two major songs used in the film were 1960's "Itsy Bitsy Teenie Weenie Yellow Polka Dot Bikini" by Brian Hyland and the 1964 version of "Silent Night" by Mary Martin.

== Reception ==
When initially released, the film was appreciated by a niche audience but did not do well commercially. Describing it as a "total loss", Shashi Kapoor lamented that at places he had to hire the theatres himself to exhibit it.

Critically, however, the film was very well received. It won the Best Direction award for Sen at the National Film Awards. Ashok Mehta's camera work was much appreciated. 36 Chowringhee Lane was also entered in the first edition of the Manila International Film Festival, where it won the top prize. Scholar Wimal Dissanayake sees the film as a portrayal of the patriarchal social system: "The film portrays the plight of a lonely woman in a society that cares little for questions of female subjectivity and self-fulfillment."

== Legacy ==
(see also English-language Indian films)

Prior to 36 Chowringhee Lane, filmmakers in India did not consider English to be a viable choice of language for feature films. After it, there has been a thin but steady stream of such films, including Sen's Mr. and Mrs. Iyer and 15 Park Avenue.

=== In popular culture ===
The title of the film has become symbolic of the city of Kolkata, particularly its cuisine. A Bangalore restaurant is called 36 Chowringhee Lane. A fast-food chain in Delhi is called 34 Chowringhee Lane.

== Awards ==
The film has been nominated for and won the following awards since its release:

1982 Manila International Film Festival (Philippines)

- Won – Golden Eagle – Best Feature Film – 36 Chowringhee Lane – Aparna Sen

1981 National Film Awards

- Won – Golden Lotus Award – Best Director – Aparna Sen; Citation: For effectively orchestrating the creative and technical elements in her first film, for a poignant portrayal of loneliness in old age and for bringing to the screen a true-to-life situation in post-independence India.
- Won – Silver Lotus Award – Best Cinematography – Ashok Mehta
- Won – Silver Lotus Award – National Film Award for Best Feature Film in English
- 1983 BAFTA Awards (UK) Nominated – Best Actress – Jennifer Kendal
- 1982 Evening Standard British Film Awards (UK) Won – Best Actress – Jennifer Kendal
