= The Father (Strindberg play) =

1887 naturalistic tragedy by August Strindberg

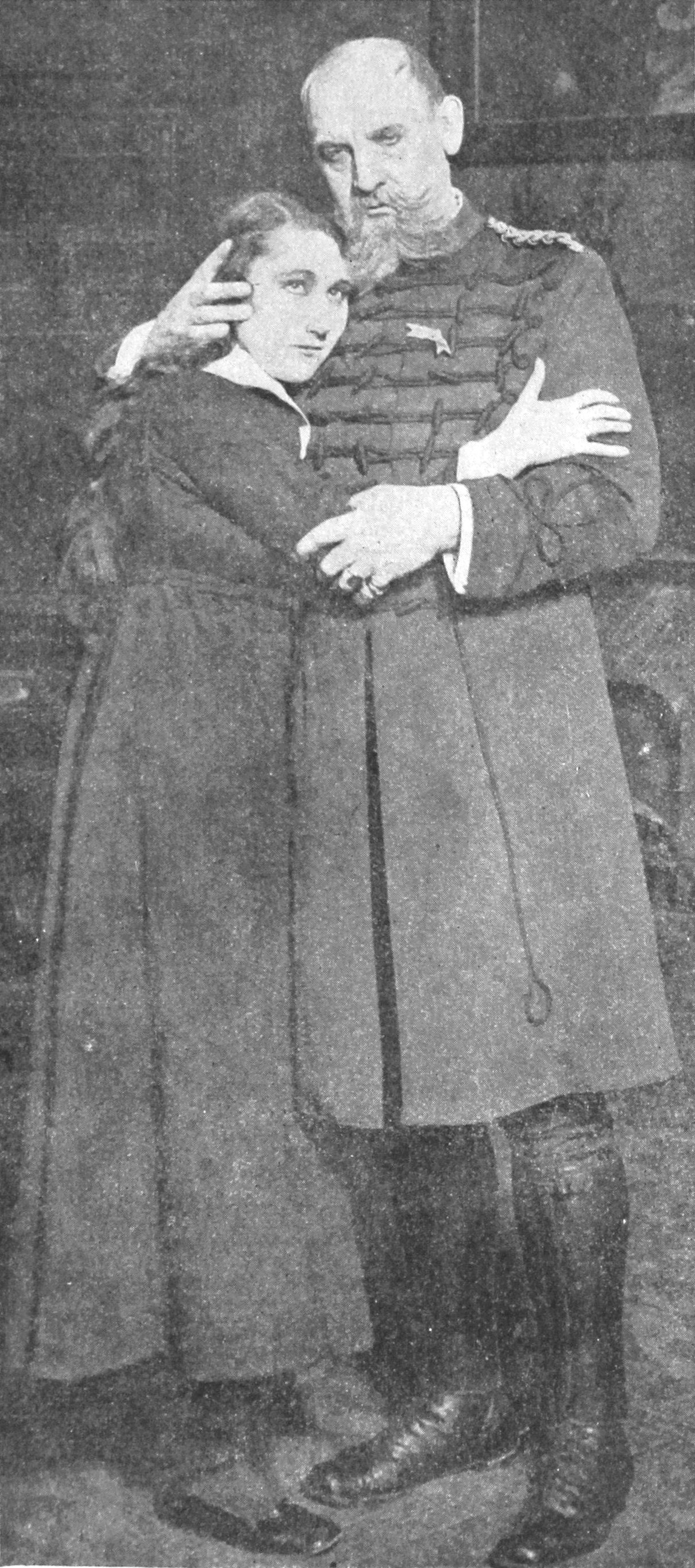
The Father at the Betty Nansen Teatret in Copenhagen in 1918. Peter Fjelstrup as The Captain and Thilda Fønss as Bertha.

The Father (Swedish: Fadren) is a naturalistic tragedy by Swedish playwright August Strindberg, written in 1887. It is about the struggle between parents over the future of their child; resulting in the mother, using her cunning manipulative skills, subduing and finally destroying the father.

== List of characters ==
- CAPTAIN ADOLF - a cavalry officer
- LAURA - his wife
- BERTHA - their daughter
- MARGRET - his old nurse
- DOCTOR OESTERMARK
- PASTOR JONAS - Laura's half-brother
- CORPORAL NOYD - an orderly
- SVAIRD - another orderly

== Plot ==
Captain Adolph, an officer of the cavalry, and his wife, Laura, have a disagreement regarding the education of their daughter Bertha. Laura wants her to stay at home and become an artist, while Adolph wants Bertha to move into town and study to be a teacher. Adolph says that his decision is final, and that the law supports him, because, he points out, the woman sells her rights when she agrees to be married. The argument grows and becomes fierce.

Laura, cunning and manipulative, suggests that Adolph may in fact have no rights in the matter. Laura lies to the family doctor that Adolph may be mad, because, as an amateur scientist, he thinks he has discovered life on another planet by looking through a microscope. Adolph in fact has discovered signs of organic life by studying meteorites through a spectroscope. Laura also reveals to the doctor that she has obtained a letter that Adolph once wrote confessing that he himself feared he might go mad.

Trapped in Laura's web of manipulation, Adolph becomes frustrated and responds with violence — he throws a burning lamp in the direction of his wife as she exits. The moment he does that, he is sunk. He realizes that Laura has cunningly provoked him to commit this irrational act, which then becomes the pretext for having him committed. While waiting for the straitjacket to arrive, the pastor tells Laura she is incredibly strong. "Let me see your hand! Not one incriminating spot of blood to give you away!" he says, "One little innocent murder that the law can't touch; an unconscious crime!" In a scene of intense emotional pathos, it is Margaret, the captain's old nurse, who cajoles the captain, who indeed has now been driven mad, into a straitjacket. Laura is presented as having a stronger will than her husband, who says to her: "You could hypnotize me when I was wide awake, so that I neither saw nor heard, only obeyed." As the captain suffers a stroke and dies, Bertha rushes to her mother, who exclaims, "My child! My own child!" as the pastor says, "Amen".

== Themes ==
This play expresses a recurrent theme in some Strindberg Naturalism: Laws and culture may influence the dynamics of men and women within their various social contracts. The play uncovers the inevitable struggle for legacy and power between the human sexes. At the time the play was written, Strindberg's marriage was deteriorating with his wife Siri von Essen, and situations in the play could have very loosely resembled situations occurring in his failing marriage. Different religions, Methodist, Baptist, and an occult spiritualism, exist in the household and vie for Bertha's acceptance. There are also references in the play to Greek Mythology and Shakespeare's Merchant of Venice and Hamlet.

== Production background ==
Strindberg was aware of the literary discussions regarding what constituted naturalism in drama, and particularly the theory of Emile Zola, who was naturalism's chief proponent. Zola felt that the naturalistic playwright should observe life very carefully, and render it in a documentary fashion. In creating character the playwright should be scientific and show that character is determined by heredity and environment. And the playwright should apply understanding of psychology and physiology. Sets and costumes should be realistic, and the long expositions and complicated intrigues of romances and the "well-made play" should be avoided. Zola felt that the French drama had not achieved true naturalism, and Strindberg felt challenged to succeed where others had not. Because of blasphemous comments, Strindberg found it hard for his work to be published and produced in Sweden. This play was the first Strindberg play to be produced outside of Scandinavia, in Berlin in 1890. The Father marked a turning point for Strindberg, as he went to a style of writing he deemed "artistic-psychological writing".

In an essay "Psychic Murder", written just after "The Father" was completed, Strindberg discusses Henrik Ibsen’s play Rosmersholm, and suggests how Ibsen might have handled Rebecca West’s "psychic murder" of Mrs. Rosmer, which Ibsen doesn't describe. It might be affected, according to Strindberg, by planting jealousy in Mrs. Rosmer's mind, the way Iago did to Othello. He then goes on to describe the very same methods that Laura uses against the Captain in The Father. The use of psychological elements in Strindberg's play move it closer to Naturalism than Ibsen's play. There is almost a Darwinian struggle between the two principals, and Darwin's theory is referenced in the play.

== English-language productions ==
Warner Oland's 1912 Broadway production of The Father was the first performance of a Strindberg play in the United States. Oland (who would later become famous for his portrayals of Fu Manchu and Charlie Chan in Hollywood films) translated, produced, and starred in the production, which met with mixed reviews and closed after 31 performances. Raymond Massey directed and starred in a 1949 Broadway production, which also featured Grace Kelly in the role of Bertha.

The play has been translated by Peter Watts (1958), Michael Meyer (1964), Harry G. Carlson (1981), Michael Robinson (1998), Gregory Motton (2000) and Laurie Slade (2012). The role of the Captain has been played in the West End by Michael Redgrave (1948), Wilfrid Lawson (1953) and Trevor Howard (1964). The play was adapted by John Osborne in 1989 a production at the Royal National Theatre. Osborne described himself as "Strindberg's Man in England" who was determined to be "the keeper of that unpredictable flame".

In 2016, Theatre for a New Audience produced David Greig's version of the play in rep with Thornton Wilder's adaptation of Ibsen's A Doll's House. Both plays were directed by Arin Arbus and starred John Douglas Thompson and Maggie Lacey.

== Foreign-language adaptation ==
In 2019 a thirty-five-year-old theater group of Calcutta, Ushneek, produced an adaptation of this Strindberg play in Bengali as "Babai". The adaptation of the play and its stage-direction has been done by Ishita Mukhopadhyay. The Captain which has been trans-created as a college teacher doing research in astrophysics is played by Debshankar Halder. The wife's role is played by Srijata Bhattacharjee while the Doctor is played by Subhashis Mukhopadhyay.

== Film adaptation ==
A Hindi film based on the play, Pita was made in India in 1991. The film was directed by acclaimed Indian filmmaker Govind Nihalani.
