= Junoon (1978 film) =

- Film poster
- Directed by: Shyam Benegal
- Written by: Shyam Benegal (screenplay); Satyadev Dubey (dialogues); Ismat Chugtai (dialogues); Ruskin Bond
- Based on: A Flight of Pigeons; 1978 novella by Ruskin Bond
- Produced by: Shashi Kapoor
- Starring: Shashi Kapoor; Shabana Azmi; Jennifer Kendal; Naseeruddin Shah
- Narrated by: Amrish Puri
- Cinematography: Govind Nihalani
- Edited by: Bhanudas Divakar
- Music by: Vanraj Bhatia
- Release date: 30 March 1979
- Running time: 141 minutes
- Country: India
- Languages: Hindi; English

Junoon (translation: The Obsession) is a 1979 Indian Hindi language film produced by Shashi Kapoor and directed by Shyam Benegal. The film is based on Ruskin Bond's fictional novella, A Flight of Pigeons, set around the Indian Rebellion of 1857. The film's soundtrack was composed by Vanraj Bhatia, and cinematography by Govind Nihalani.

Its cast included Shashi Kapoor, his wife Jennifer Kendal, Nafisa Ali, Tom Alter, Shabana Azmi, Kulbhushan Kharbanda, Naseeruddin Shah, Deepti Naval, Pearl Padamsee and Sushma Seth. The film also featured Shashi and Jennifer's children Karan Kapoor, Kunal Kapoor, and Sanjana Kapoor.

== Plot ==
The story is set around the Indian Rebellion of 1857. Javed Khan (Shashi Kapoor) is a reckless feudal chieftain of Muslim Pathan heritage, whose world revolves around breeding carrier pigeons. His younger brother-in-law, Sarfaraz Khan (Naseeruddin Shah) is politically awakened and actively plots the fight against the British Empire. Freedom fighters attack the local British administrators while they are in Sunday Worship at church, massacring them all. Miriam Labadoor (Jennifer Kendal) manages to escape with her daughter, Ruth (Nafisa Ali), and mother (Ismat Chugtai), who is a Muslim woman from the royal Nawabi family of Rampur and was married to an Englishman. The three women seek refuge with the wealthy Hindu family of Lala Ramjimal (Kulbhushan Kharbanda). Lala is torn between his loyalty to India and his privileged position under the British, and also his silent love towards Miriam, who seems to also reciprocate it silently. However, matters are taken out of his hands by Javed Khan who barges into Lala's house and forcibly takes Ruth and her family to his own house. This leads to jealousy on the part of his wife, Firdaus (Shabana Azmi), and anger on the part of his brother, who ultimately gives in to the Pathan tradition of offering hospitality and sanctuary (Nanawatai) even to uninvited guests. Various situations ensue due to cultural misunderstandings in the domestic routine of the Muslim household with its new English guests. Javed falls in love with Ruth, and wants to marry her but is opposed bitterly by her mother. Noticing the intense feelings of Javed for her daughter Ruth, Miriam cleverly makes an agreement with Javed that she would only give her daughter's hand to Javed if the British were defeated. At first, Javed is hesitant but accepts the deal when again Miriam asks him if he has misgivings in his war against the British. There is simmering of a love affair under the watchful suspicious eyes of Firdaus.

Meanwhile, the Rebellion runs into problems and the British are defeating the poorly organised Indian forces. In a stormy scene, Sarfaraz destroys Javed's pigeon coops and sets his pets free after he finds out that Indian forces have lost the Battle for Delhi. There is a delayed recognition by Javed of his subjugated identity, colonised by the British. Sarfaraz dies in a battle against the British. The Labadoors return to the protection of the re-deployed British contingent, smuggled by Firdaus, who only wants to save her marriage. Javed finds out that the Labadoors have sought sanctuary in the church and rushes there to meet Ruth one last time. Surprisingly, Ruth comes out and expresses her feelings for Javed against her mother's will. However, Javed honourably keeps his word he had given Miriam Labadoor and leaves the church without Ruth. The movie ends here with the voiceover that Javed was martyred fighting the British while Ruth and her mother return to England. Ruth dies fifty-five years later, unwed.

== Cast ==
- Shashi Kapoor as Javed Khan
- Nafisa Ali as Ruth Labadoor
- Jennifer Kendal as Miriam Labadoor (Ruth's mother)
- Naseeruddin Shah as Sarfaraz Khan, Javed's brother-in-law
- Shabana Azmi as Firdaus, Javed's wife
- Ismat Chughtai as Miriam's mother
- Kulbhushan Kharbanda as Lala Ramjimal
- Sanjana Kapoor
- Kunal Kapoor
- Karan Kapoor
- Benjamin Gilani as Rashid Khan
- Sushma Seth as Javed's aunt
- Tom Alter as Priest (Ruth's father)
- Amrish Puri as the Narrator
- Jalal Agha as Kader Khan
- Geoffrey Kendal
- Rajesh Vivek
- Deepti Naval as Rashid's wife
- Pearl Padamsee as Akhtarbee, a bitter woman
- Savita Bajaj

== Reception ==
In a retrospective review, Raja Sen of Rediff.com called it "an overwhelmingly powerful film, a bittersweet, entirely futile love story."

== Awards ==
1979 National Film Awards:

- Best Feature Film in Hindi – Shashi Kapoor
- Best Cinematography – Govind Nihalani
- Best Audiography – Hitendra Ghosh

27th Filmfare Awards:

Won

- Best Film – Shashi Kapoor
- Best Director – Shyam Benegal
- Best Dialogue – Pandit Satyadev Dubey
- Best Cinematography – Govind Nihalani
- Best Editing – Bhanudas Divakar
- Best Sound Recording – Hitendra Ghosh

Nominated

- Best Supporting Actor – Naseeruddin Shah
- Best Supporting Actress – Jennifer Kendal
- Best Story – Ruskin Bond

=== Recognition ===
- Inaugural film at the 7th International Film Festival, New Delhi, 1979.
- Official Indian entry at the XIth Moscow International Film Festival.
- Featured at the Montreal World Film Festival 1979, the Cairo International Film Festival 1979, the Sydney Film Festival 1980 and the Melbourne International Film Festival 1980.

== Soundtrack ==
Junoon

Soundtrack album by Vanraj Bhatia
- Released: 1978
- Genre: Film soundtrack
- Label: His Master's Voice
- Producer: Kersy Lord

The soundtrack features 4 songs, composed by Vanraj Bhatia, with original lyrics from Yogesh Praveen and other lyrics by Amir Khusro, Jigar Moradabadi and Sant Kabir.

1. "Khusro rain piya ki jaagi pee ke sang" – Jamil Ahmad
2. "Ishq ne todi sar pe qayamat" – Mohammad Rafi
3. "Come live with me and be my love" – Jennifer Kendal
4. "Ghir aayi kari ghata matwali sawan ki aayi bahaar re" – Asha Bhosle, Varsha Bhosle

== See also ==
- List of Asian historical drama films
