= Kunal Kapoor (actor, born 1959) =

Indian actor

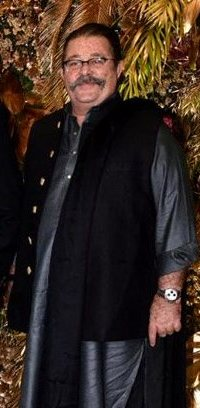
- Kapoor in 2020
- Born: 26 June 1959 (age 67); Bombay, Bombay State, India
- Occupations: Actor; filmmaker
- Organization(s): Adfilm-Valas, Prithvi Theatre (2017-present)
- Spouse: Sheena Sippy (divorced)
- Children: 2, including Zahan Kapoor
- Parents: Shashi Kapoor (father); Jennifer Kendal (mother)
- Family: Kapoor family, Sippy family

Kunal Kapoor (born 26 June 1959) is an Indian actor, film producer, director and advertisement maker. He has been the Managing Trustee of Prithvi Theatre, found by his parents. Elder son of actors Shashi Kapoor and Jennifer Kendal, he made his debut with the 1972 English-language film Siddhartha, later acted in Shyam Benegal's Junoon and in his first mainstream Bollywood film, Ahista Ahista, opposite Padmini Kolhapure as well as Vijeta. He also acted in the art films Utsav (1984) and Trikal (1985).

In 1987, he stopped acting after Trikal to set up his own company, Adfilm-Valas, to produce and direct television commercials. Adfilm Valas has also line-produced for many international feature films and ad films shot in India. Notably, the credit sequence of the film City of Joy, and the French films Le Cactus (2005) and Fire in Paradise.

In 2015, he returned to films after 30 years, appearing in Singh is Bling as Amy Jackson's character's father.

== Personal life ==
Kunal Kapoor was born into the famous Kapoor family, of Indian cinema. He is the eldest child of Shashi Kapoor and his British theater-actress wife Jennifer Kapoor. His paternal grandfather, Prithviraj Kapoor, was a doyen of the theatre, a pioneer of the Indian film industry. His maternal grandfather, Geoffrey Kendal, was a British theatre personality

Kapoor's siblings are Karan Kapoor (b. 18 January 1962) and Sanjana Kapoor (b. 27 November 1967). Karan, a popular model who also worked in a few films in the 1980s, now runs a photography business in the UK. Sanjana ran the ancestral Prithvi Theatre and is married to Valmik Thapar, a noted conservationist.

Kunal was married to filmmaker Ramesh Sippy's daughter Sheena, who is a well-known photographer. They have two children together, a son named Zahan Prithviraj Kapoor, and a daughter. Kunal and Sheena are now divorced.

== Filmography ==
=== Actor ===
Year	Film	Role	Notes
1972	Siddhartha	Siddhartha's son	English film
1978	Junoon		
1981	Ahista Ahista	Kunal	
1982	Vijeta	Angad	
1984	Utsav	Aryak	
1985	Trikal	Kapitan Ribeiro/ Governor	
2015	Singh is Bling	Mr. Rana, Sara's Father	
2019	Panipat	Shuja-ud-Daula	
