= Aranyaka (film) =

Aranyaka अरण्यक
- Directed by: Apurba Kishore Bir
- Written by: Apurba Kishore Bir
- Based on: Aranyaka by Manoj Das
- Produced by: NFDC; Doordarshan
- Starring: Sarat Pujari; Navni Parihar; Sanjana Kapoor; Mohan Gokhale
- Cinematography: Apurba Kishore Bir
- Edited by: Dilip Panda
- Music by: Bhavdeep Jaipurwalle
- Release date: 1994
- Running time: 84 min.
- Country: India
- Language: Hindi

Aranyaka (A Trip into the Jungle) is a 1994 Indian Hindi drama film directed by Apurba Kishore Bir. The film stars Sarat Pujari, Navni Parihar, Sanjana Kapoor and Mohan Gokhale in lead roles. Based on a short story Aranyaka by eminent writer Padma Bhushan Manoj Das, the film is set in rural Odisha, where a formal local ruler organizes a hunt for his invited guests, which goes wrong. The film highlights the clash between ruling class and indigenous people of the region.

== Cast ==
- Sarat Pujari as Raja Saheb
- Mohan Gokhale as Mr. Mitty
- Lalatendu Rath as Major
- Sanjana Kapoor as Elina
- Navni Parihar as Mrs. Mitty
- Sunil Sing as Shyamal
- Subrata Mahapatra as Chowkidar
- Jangyaseni Jena as Tribal girl
- Ajay Nath as Tribal boy
- Pritikrushna Mahanty as Tribal boy
- Ashim Basu as Mad beggar
