= Shashi Kapoor =

Indian actor and producer (1938–2017)

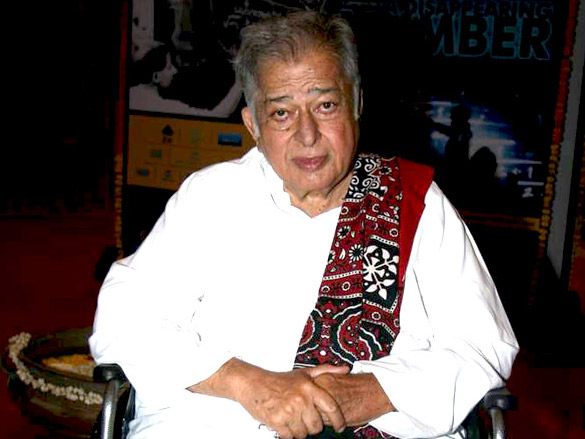
- Kapoor in 2010
- Born: Balbir Raj Kapoor; 18 March 1938; Calcutta, Bengal Province, British India
- Died: 4 December 2017 (aged 79); Mumbai, Maharashtra, India
- Occupations: Actor; film producer
- Years active: 1948–1998
- Works: Full list
- Spouse: Jennifer Kendal (m. 1958; died 1984)
- Children: Kunal Kapoor; Karan Kapoor; Sanjana Kapoor
- Father: Prithviraj Kapoor
- Family: Kapoor family
- Awards: Full list
- Honours: Padma Bhushan (2011); Dadasaheb Phalke Award (2014)

Shashi Kapoor (pronounced [ʃəʃi kəpuːɾ]; born Balbir Raj Kapoor; 18 March 1938 – 4 December 2017) was an Indian actor and producer known primarily for his work in Hindi films. He is considered as one of the greatest actors in the history of Hindi cinema, and is a recipient of several accolades, including four National Film Awards and two Filmfare Awards. The Government of India honoured him with the Padma Bhushan in 2011, and the Dadasaheb Phalke Award in 2014, for his contribution to Indian cinema.

Born into the Kapoor family, he was the third and the youngest son of Prithviraj Kapoor. He began his career as a child actor in 1948 with his brother Raj Kapoor's maiden directorial Aag, and had his first role as an adult in 1961 with Yash Chopra's political drama Dharmputra. He established himself in 1965 with two blockbusters - Waqt and Jab Jab Phool Khile. This was followed by a period of further success, with Kanyadaan, Sharmeelee and Aa Gale Lag Jaa. His career reached new heights in 1974 with Chor Machaye Shor. With its success, Kapoor became the top five to six saleable stars of the time and starred in top–grossing Hindi films from the early-1970s to 1980s, such as Roti Kapada Aur Makaan, Deewaar, Chori Mera Kaam, Kabhi Kabhie, Fakira, Trishul, Suhaag, Kaala Patthar, Kranti and Namak Halaal. He received critical acclaim for his portrayal of a reckless chieftain in Junoon, a businessman in Kalyug, a strict father in Vijeta and an upright journalist in New Delhi Times for which he won National Film Award for Best Actor. The last film that he appeared in, was the much delayed Ghar Bazar which was released in 1998.

== Early life ==
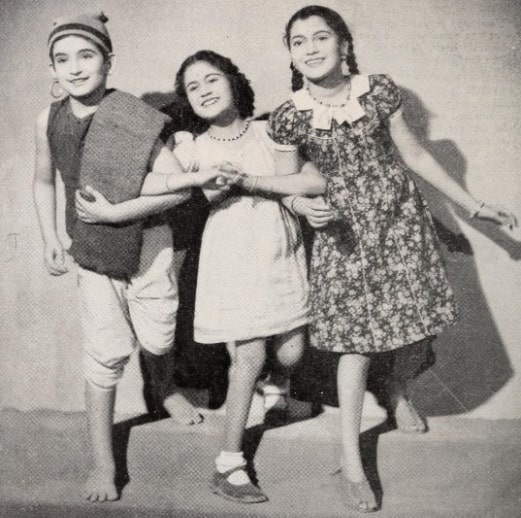
Shashi Kapoor (left) with Baby Madhuri (centre) and Baby Shakuntala (right)

Shashi Kapoor was born as Balbir Raj Kapoor to Prithviraj Kapoor and his wife in Calcutta, British India, on 18 March 1938. He was the youngest brother of Raj Kapoor and Shammi Kapoor. Actor Trilok Kapoor was his paternal uncle.

Kapoor acted in plays, directed and produced by his father Prithviraj Kapoor, while travelling with Prithvi Theatres. He started acting in films as a child in the late 1940s under the name of Shashiraj, as there was already another actor by the same name who used to act in mythological films as a child. His best-known performances as a child actor were in Aag (1948) and Awaara (1951), where he played the younger version of the characters played by his older brother Raj Kapoor, and in Sangram (1950), where he played the younger version of Ashok Kumar and Dana Paani (1953) where he acted with Bharat Bhushan. He worked in four Hindi films as a child actor from 1948 to 1954.

== Career ==
=== Rise to prominence (1961–1973) ===
After appearing as a child artist in some highly successful films like Sangram (1950), Samadhi (1950) and Awaara (1951), Shashi Kapoor made his debut as a leading man in 1961 with Yash Chopra's partition drama Dharmputra. This was followed by another film released the same year, Char Diwari. Both Dharmputra and Char Diwari did not do well financially. From 1962 to 1964, Kapoor had minor successes with - Bimal Roy's Prem Patra (1962) and Kanak Mishra's Yeh Dil Kisko Doon (1963). He also made his English film debut in 1963 with James Ivory's acclaimed family drama The Householder.

The year 1965 changed his fortune as he starred in two highest grossing films of that year with Yash Chopra's masala film Waqt and Suraj Prakash's romantic musical Jab Jab Phool Khile. Waqt went on to become a massive box office success, receiving praise for cast performances, Chopra's direction and cinematography. Today, it is widely regarded as an evergreen classic. The huge box office success of Waqt was followed by another, Jab Jab Phool Khile which had Kapoor paired opposite Nanda. It too opened to highly positive response from critics, especially for its soundtrack composed by Kalyanji–Anandji, which was the fourth best-selling Hindi film album of the 1960s with a number of melodious songs, like "Ye Samaa Samaa Hai Pyar Ka", "Affoo Khudaya", "Ek Tha Gul Aur Ek Thi Bulbul", "Na Na Karte Pyar Tumhin Se", "Pardesiyon Se Na Ankhiyan Milana". Jab Jab Phool Khile made Kapoor a star and won him that year's BFJA Award for Best Actor (Hindi) for his moving performance of an innocent boatman in the film.

In spite of establishing himself, Kapoor had only a few major hits and some lukewarm successes in the late-1960s.

In 1966, he starred alongside Kishore Kumar, Mehmood, Kalpana Mohan, Rajasree and Mumtaz in C. V. Sridhar's romantic comedy Pyar Kiye Jaa. Pyar Kiye Jaa proved to be a hit, but his other release Neend Hamari Khwab Tumhare again opposite Nanda did only average business at the box office. After seeing two more moderate successes in 1967 with Dil Ne Pukara and Aamne Samne, the following year, he delivered a superhit in Kanyadaan opposite Asha Parekh, followed by a hit film Haseena Maan Jayegi co-starring Babita. The soundtrack of Kanyadaan composed by Shankar-Jaikishan was also very successful with two chartbuster Mohammed Rafi solos - "Likhe Jo Khat Tujhe" and "Meri Zindagi Mein Aate". In the beginning of the 1970s, Kapoor delivered two notable commercial successes, Samir Ganguly's romantic thriller Sharmeelee (1971) opposite Rakhee Gulzar and Manmohan Desai's romantic drama Aa Gale Lag Jaa (1973) co-starring Sharmila Tagore.

=== Further success (1974–1982) ===
The year 1974 changed the trajectory of Kapoor's career, elevating him to a new level. It started with Ashok Roy's action comedy Chor Machaye Shor which also had Mumtaz, Asrani and Danny Denzongpa in the lead. Chor Machaye Shor proved to be a blockbuster in India as well as overseas, putting a line of producers outside Kapoor's house and making him top five to six saleable stars of the time. The huge box office success of Chor Machaye Shor was followed by Manoj Kumar's social drama Roti Kapada Aur Makaan. Roti Kapada Aur Makaan went on to become an All Time Blockbuster and is regarded as one of the most influential movies of its time. Roti Kapada Aur Makaan and Chor Machaye Shor took first and second spot, respectively at the box office in 1974. Apart from commercial success, both the films had highly successful music and were two of the best-selling Bollywood albums of the decade. The song "Le Jayenge, Le Jayenge Dilwale Dulhaniya Le Jayenge" from Chor Machaye Shor was so popular that it went on to inspire the title of Shah Rukh Khan starrer Dilwale Dulhania Le Jayenge. 1975 proved to be another iconic year for Kapoor as he formed a hit pair with megastar Amitabh Bachchan and together both of them gave many successful and iconic films to Hindi cinema. His first release Anari underperformed commercially, but his second release, Deewaar directed by Yash Chopra, written by Salim-Javed and co-starring Bachchan, Parveen Babi, Neetu Singh, proved to be a widespread critical and commercial success, eventually emerging a major blockbuster. Today, it is considered one of the best films ever made in the history of Indian cinema and got featured in the book 1001 Movies You Must See Before You Die. One of Kapoor's dialogue "Mere paas maa hai" ("I have mother"), is widely known in India and has become part of Indian popular culture. His impactful portrayal of a police officer torn between love for his brother and duty met with acclaim and won him Filmfare Award for Best Supporting Actor. His next release was Raj Khosla's romantic drama Prem Kahani which also had Rajesh Khanna and Mumtaz in the lead. The film received good response from reviewers as well as the audience and proved to be a hit at the box office. Kapoor delivered another huge hit that year with Brij Sadanah's action comedy Chori Mera Kaam opposite Zeenat Aman, followed by a semi-hit film, Salaakhen alongside Sulakshana Pandit to go with the huge grossers. He began 1976 with Yash Chopra's romantic musical Kabhi Kabhie. It had a massive star cast comprising Waheeda Rehman, Bachchan, Rishi Kapoor, Rakhee and Neetu Singh. Despite its heavy theme, Kabhi Kabhie went on to become a superhit. It also had a chartbuster soundtrack composed by Khayyam with lyrics written by Sahir Ludhianvi. Rakesh Budhu of Planet Bollywood gave 9.5 stars out of 10 to the album stating, "Kabhi Kabhie will remain an ode to brilliant melody". For his performance in the film, Kapoor received a nomination in the Filmfare Award for Best Supporting Actor category. After the huge success of Kabhi Kabhie, he reunited with the team of Chor Machaye Shor and delivered another blockbuster in Fakira, which was also remade in Telugu as Dongalaku Donga (1977). This was followed by two more successes in Shibu Mitra's Shankar Dada and Mohan Kumar's Aap Beati.

The following year, Kapoor reunited with Bachchan for Desh Mukherjee's highly anticipated actioner Immaan Dharam, which took a bumper opening, but collections dropped afterwards due to poor reception and it ended up as a flop venture by the conclusion of its run. His most of the other releases that year, such as Hira Aur Patthar, Farishta Ya Qatil, Chakkar Pe Chakkar met the same fate, with the exceptions being Prayag Raj's Chor Sipahee and Raj Tilak's Mukti. This changed in 1978 as he delivered a string of successes with Phaansi, Satyam Shivam Sundaram, Trishul, Trishna, Amar Shakti and Aahuti. Kapoor also set up his own production house, Film-Valas, the same year. In 1979, he reunited with Bachchan for two big-budget actioners, The first one was Yash Chopra's Kaala Patthar and the second was Manmohan Desai's Suhaag. Kaala Patthar written by Salim-Javed went on to become a hit. One song from the film, "Ek Raasta Hai Zindagi" sung by Kishore Kumar and filmed on Kapoor remains highly popular till date. Suhaag, on the other hand, was a blockbuster as well as the highest-grossing film of 1979. That same year, he produced and starred in Shyam Benegal's art-house film Junoon which also had Nafisa Ali, Shabana Azmi, Jennifer Kendal and Naseeruddin Shah in the lead. Junoon met with acclaim, winning Kapoor National Award for Best Feature Film (Hindi) as well as Filmfare Award for Best Film.

In 1980, Kapoor delivered a hit with Swayamvar, but his other releases, such as Do Aur Do Paanch and Neeyat failed to leave a mark while Ramesh Sippy's mega-budget action crime film Shaan ended up as an average grosser owing to huge costs. The following year, he co-starred alongside Dilip Kumar, Manoj Kumar, Hema Malini, Shatrughan Sinha and Parveen Babi in the epic historical drama Kranti. It went on to become the biggest patriotic hit of all time, topping the box office chart in 1981 and emerging an All Time Blockbuster. That same year, he saw a moderate success in Maan Gaye Ustaad and received acclaim for his performances in Yash Chopra's romantic drama Silsila and Shyam Benegal's crime drama Kalyug (which he also produced). Kapoor had five releases in 1982. He found no success in Vakil Babu and Sawaal. However, Bapu's crime drama film Bezubaan opposite Reena Roy was a hit and Prakash Mehra's masala film Namak Halaal co-starring Bachchan, Smita Patil and Parveen Babi went on to become a blockbuster. His other notable release that year was Govind Nihalani's coming-of-age war film Vijeta, which had his son Kunal Kapoor in his acting debut. The film flopped commercially, but received immense critical acclaim and won three awards at the 31st Filmfare Awards.

=== Later career (1983–1998) ===
Post-1982, Kapoor's star power began to wane as he shifted his focus majorly towards parallel cinema and limited his work in mainstream films, accepting only few offers. After not seeing any success in 1983, the next year, he produced and starred in Girish Karnad's critically acclaimed erotic drama Utsav. It was filmed in Hindi and English simultaneously, the post-production work of latter version was done in London. He also played a supporting role in K. Bapayya's superhit drama film Ghar Ek Mandir. In 1985, he appeared in Babbar Subhash's Aandhi-Toofan and Shakti Samanta's Alag Alag. While Aandhi-Toofan emerged a success, Alag Alag flopped at the box office.

1986 proved to be a notable year for Kapoor as he won his first National Award for Best Actor and second BFJA Award for Best Actor (Hindi) for the extraordinary portrayal of an honest journalist in Ramesh Sharma's highly acclaimed political thriller New Delhi Times. His another major release of the year was Shibu Mitra's multi-starrer actioner Ilzaam co-starring Shatrughan Sinha, Govinda, Neelam and Anita Raj. The film proved to be a huge hit and also one of the top grossers of the year.

In 1987, he reunited with Govinda and Neelam for K. Ravi Shankar's actioner Sindoor which also had Jaya Prada in the lead. He also did a guest appearance in Gulzar's romantic musical Ijaazat. Although Ijaazat was a commercial failure, it won massive critical acclaim. On the other hand, Sindoor emerged a hit and also proved to be Kapoor's last box office success. In 1988, he acted with Pierce Brosnan in The Deceivers. The following year, he appeared in films, such as Farz Ki Jung, Gair Kanooni and Clerk, none of which performed well critically or commercially.

Shashi Kapoor requested Amitabh Bachchan to star in his ambitious directorial debut film Ajooba (1991). Bachchan made a notable exception and agreed to do the film due to their friendship, even though at the time Amitabh was not signing any new films. Despite having a lavish budget and a huge star cast, the film flopped miserably at the box office. Kapoor also won Special Jury Award for his performance in the 1993 film In Custody and played the Rajah in the TV miniseries Gulliver's Travels (1996).

In 1998, he retired from acting after his final film appearances in Jinnah, Side Streets and the much delayed Ghar Bazar.

=== Post-retirement (2007–2010) ===
He was seen in the limelight at the Shashi Kapoor Film Festival held in Muscat, Oman (September 2007). At the 55th Annual Filmfare Awards in 2010, Shashi Kapoor received the Filmfare Lifetime Achievement Award.

== Personal life ==
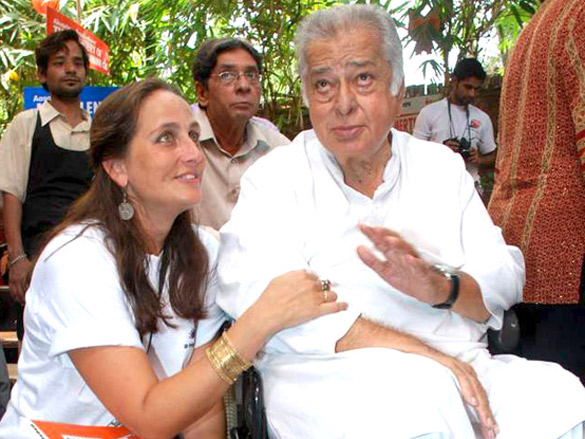
Shashi Kapoor with daughter Sanjana in 2010

Kapoor attended Don Bosco High School in Matunga, Mumbai. He met English actress Jennifer Kendal in Calcutta in 1956 while both were working for their respective theatre groups. Shashi was both assistant stage manager as well as an actor for his father's theatre group, Prithvi Theatre. Geoffrey Kendal's Shakespearean group was also present at the same time in Calcutta and Jennifer was Geoffrey's daughter. After their subsequent meeting, the couple fell in love and after facing initial opposition from the Kendals and support from sister-in-law Geeta Bali, they got married in July 1958. They acted in a number of films together, most notably in Merchant Ivory productions. They had three children: Kunal Kapoor, Karan Kapoor and Sanjana Kapoor. Jennifer and Shashi established Prithvi Theatre on 5 November 1978 in Mumbai. Jennifer died of cancer in 1984 which shattered him. After losing her to cancer, Shashi Kapoor fell into a deep depression that he never recovered from. English actress Felicity Kendal is his sister-in-law.

His eldest son Kunal is married to director Ramesh Sippy's daughter. Kunal moved on to ad film direction and established his production house Adfilm-Valas. Shashi's daughter Sanjana, is a theatre personality and married to wildlife conservationist Valmik Thapar. They have a son named Hamir. Shashi's younger son Karan became successful in modeling and later settled down in London and runs a photography company. His grandson Zahan who is son of Kunal made his debut in Faraaz (2023).

== Reception and legacy ==
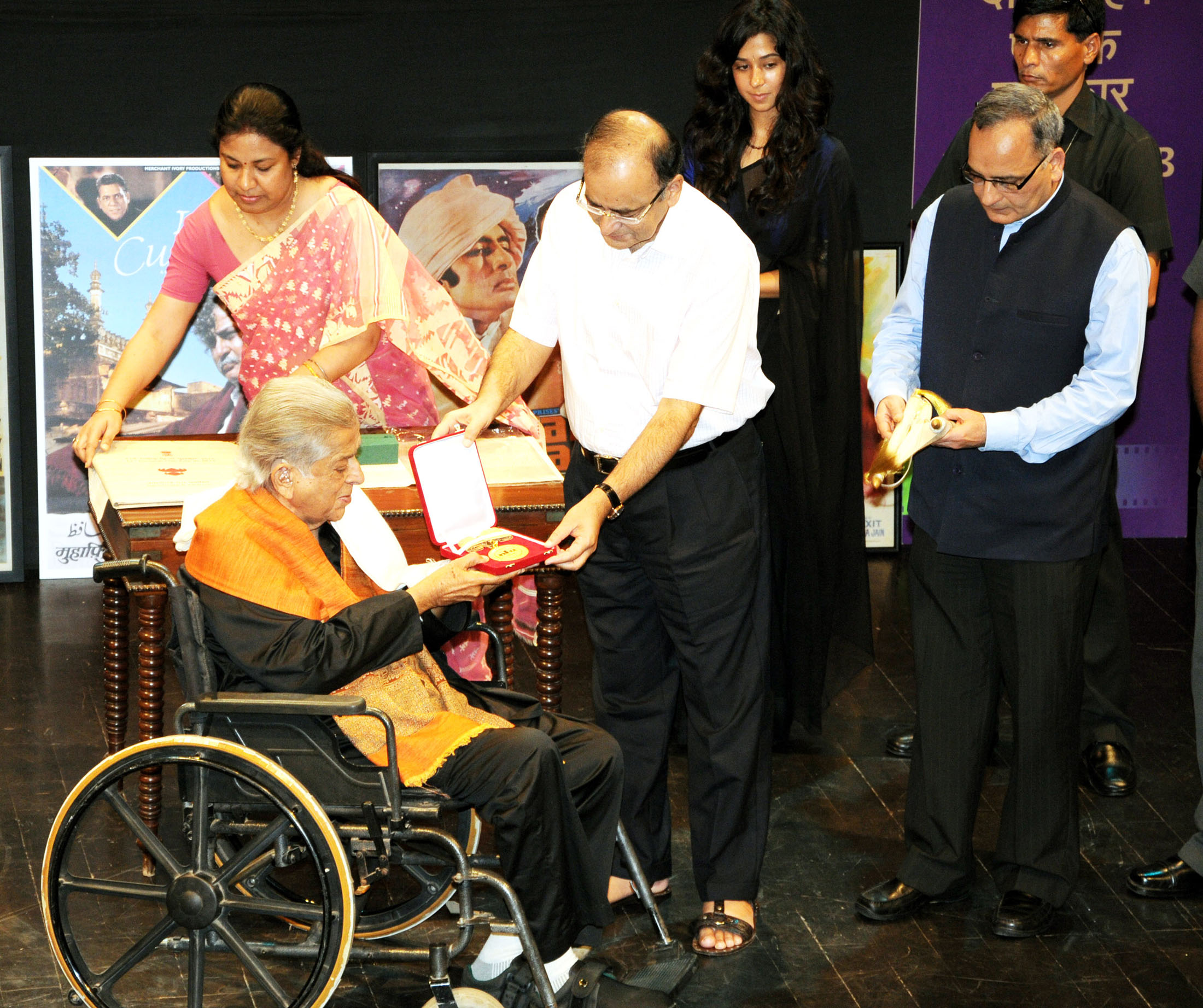
Shashi Kapoor receiving Dada Saheb Phalke Award in 2013

Kapoor is regarded as one of the greatest and most successful actors of Indian cinema. Apart from his work in mainstream Hindi films, he is known for acting and producing several acclaimed films of parallel cinema such as, Junoon (1979), Kalyug (1981), 36 Chowringhee Lane (1981), Vijeta (1982) and Utsav (1984).

Commenting on Kapoor's career, Shubhra Gupta noted: "Kapoor belonged to a gentler, kinder era, when Hindi cinema was moving away from the nation-building stories of the ‘50s, he was gentle, debonair, and the ultimate sophisticate. Kapoor wore his looks, and his understated acting ability lightly, sometimes so lightly that you often overlooked his skills." Dinesh Raheja of Rediff.com noted, "The actor who became the 1960s-1970s icon of suave, believed in pushing the envelope, while remaining rooted in commercial cinema." Times Now placed him 4th in its list of the “Most Good Looking Actors on Indian Screen". In 2022, he was placed in Outlook India's "75 Best Bollywood Actors" list.

Kapoor has been the solo lead in 61 films and among the lead protagonist in 116 films, more than his nephews, brothers, grand-nephews and grand-nieces. Kapoor's deep attachment and commitment to theatre which started in childhood remained almost untouched even when he was immobile due to age-related complications. After renovating Prithvi Theatre in the western part of Mumbai, he was able to successfully create an environment congenial for creative pursuits. Even today, Prithvi Theatre oozes out an infectious creative energy which can compel people to become dedicated theatre artists and earn a decent living, due to the consistent efforts of Kapoor who would be present for special theme-based theatre festivals at the theatre. In 2016, Aseem Chhabra wrote his biography "Shashi Kapoor: The Householder, the Star".

== Work and accolades ==
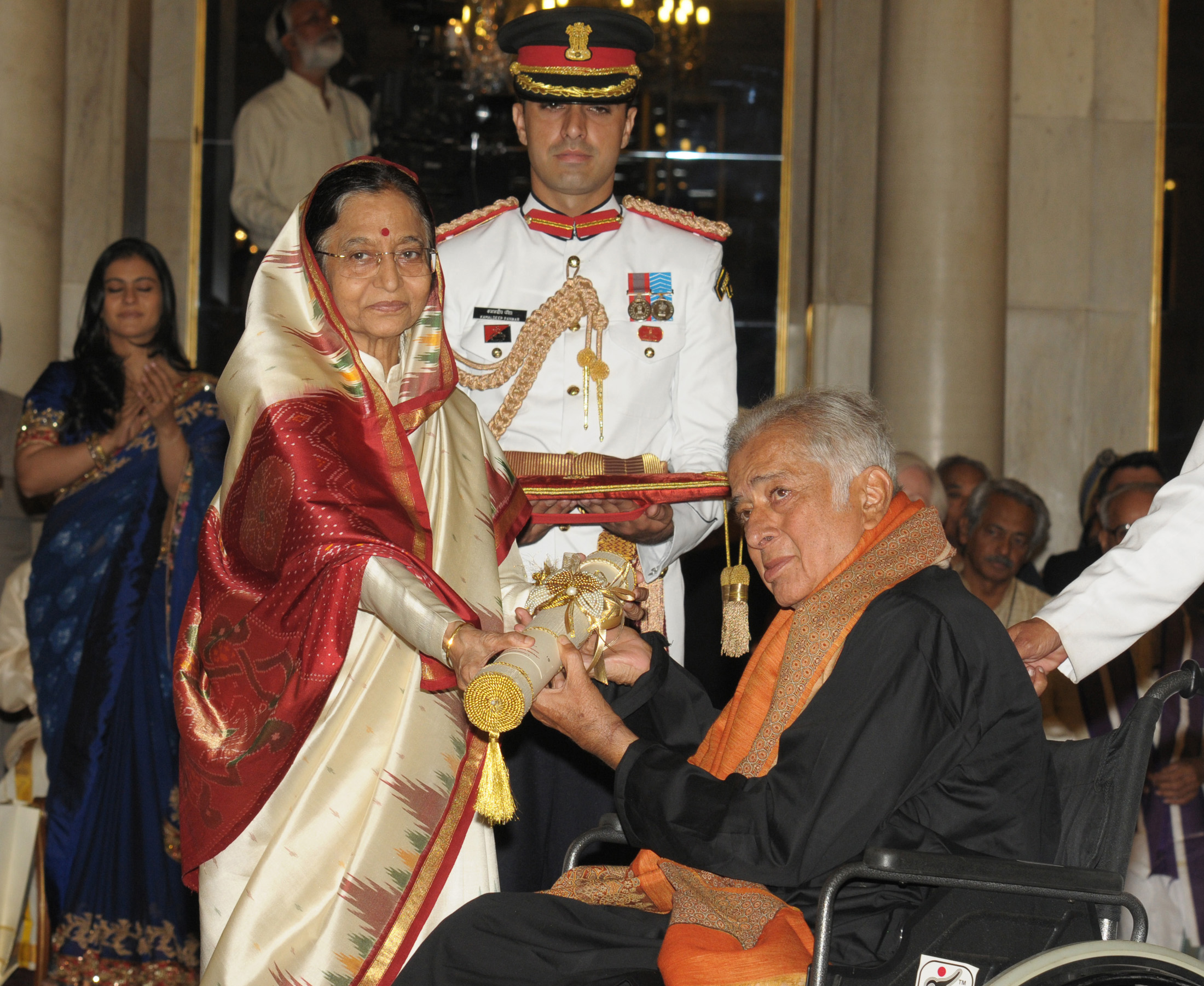
The President, Smt. Pratibha Devisingh Patil presenting the Padma Bhushan to Shashi Kapoor

In 2011, the Government of India honored him with the Padma Bhushan for his contributions to Indian cinema.

== Death and tributes ==
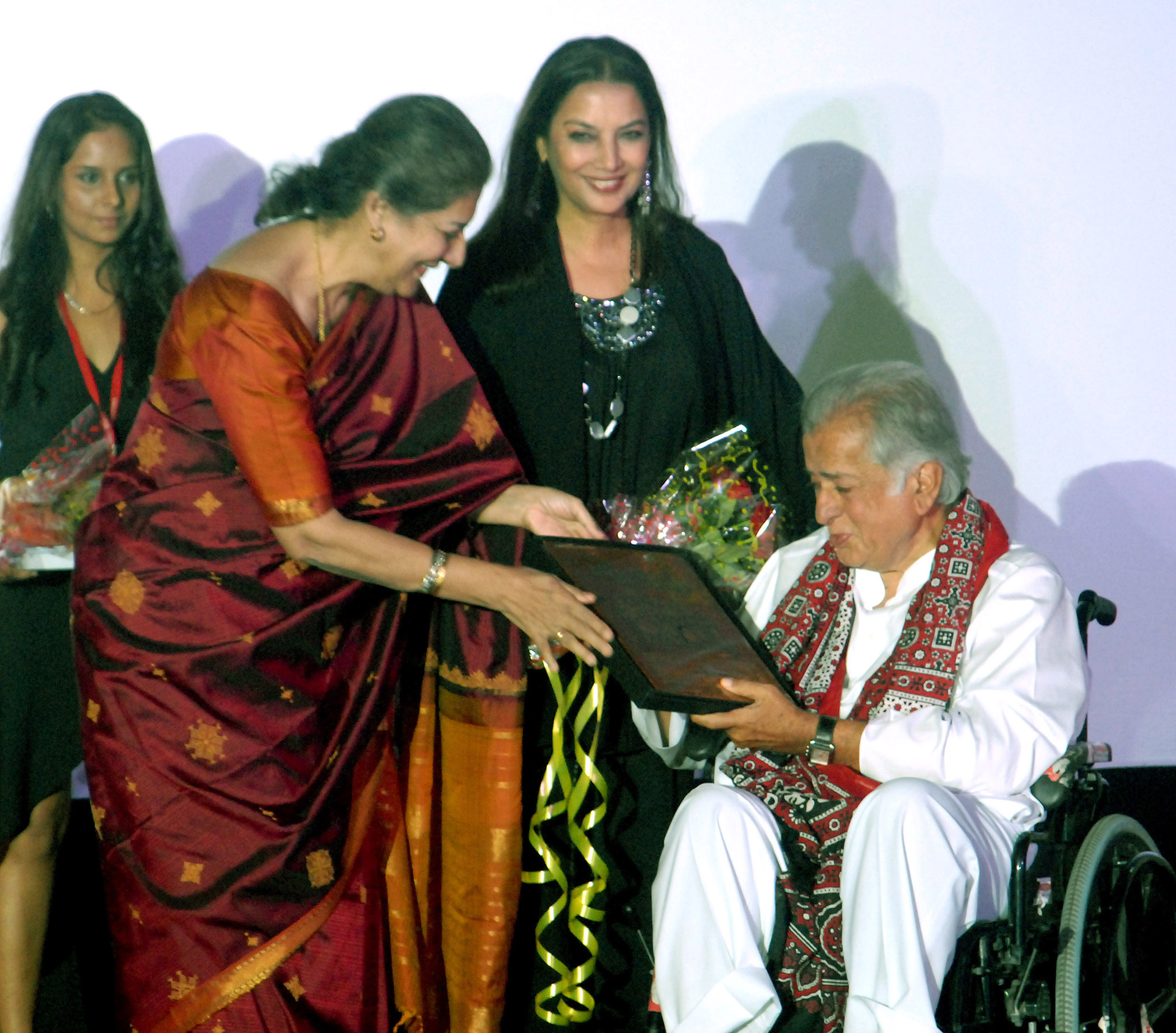
Kapoor at an event in 2009, photographed wearing Ajrak

Kapoor was admitted to the Kokilaben Hospital, Versova, Mumbai, for what was speculated to be chest infection, and died on 4 December 2017. According to The Guardian, he was in hospital for treatment from long-standing liver and heart complications, and was always helping other patients. Officially, his cause of death was attributed to liver cirrhosis. His body was cremated on 5 December 2017, at the Santacruz Hindu Crematorium in Mumbai.

Kapoor and actress Sridevi, who died in 2018, were the only two Indians to be honored posthumously in memoriam at the 90th Academy Awards. In his honour, his autograph was inducted into the Bollywood Walk of Fame at Bandra Bandstand.

== Books ==
- Shashi Kapoor presents the Prithviwallahs, by Shashi Kapoor, Deepa Gahlot, Prithvi Theatre (Mumbai, India). Roli Books, 2004. ISBN 81-7436-348-3.

== See also ==
- Kapoor Family
