= Prithvi Theatre =

Theatre in Mumbai, India

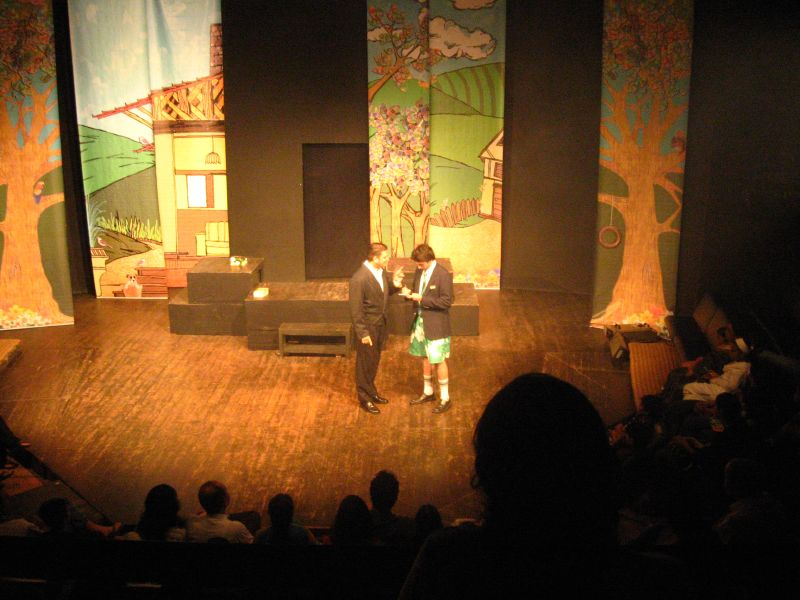
- The main thrust stage at Prithvi Theatre, Mumbai.
- Formation: 1978
- Founder: Shashi Kapoor; Jennifer Kapoor
- Location: 20 Janki Kutir, Juhu Church Road, Mumbai-49
- Services: Performing arts and Fine arts organisation, theatre venue
- Key people: Kunal Kapoor (Managing Trustee); Sanjana Kapoor (Director, 1993-2012); Zahan Kapoor (Trustee)
- Website: www.prithvitheatre.org

Prithvi Theatre is a theatre and non-profit arts organisation located in Juhu, Mumbai. Established in 1978 to promote Hindi theatre, it has its origins in Prithvi Theatres, a travelling theatre company founded by Prithviraj Kapoor in 1944, who was the spearhead of one of the most influential actor and director families in Bollywood, the Kapoor family. The company toured extensively across India for sixteen years and played an influential role in the development of modern Hindi theatre.

The present theatre was established by Prithviraj Kapoor’s son, actor Shashi Kapoor, and his wife, Jennifer Kapoor, in fulfilment of his long-held vision of creating a permanent home for his repertory company. Designed by architect Ved Segan, the theatre was inaugurated on 5 November 1978. Jennifer Kapoor supervised its construction and administration until her death in 1984. Shashi Kapoor subsequently served as its Managing Trustee, while the theatre’s day-to-day management was undertaken by their son, Kunal Kapoor, who currently serves as Managing Trustee.

Prithvi Theatre stages performances every day except Monday and organises an annual summer programme of workshops and plays for children. Its regular events include the "Prithvi Memorial Concert", held on 28 February, and the annual "Prithvi Theatre Festival" in November, which was first launched in 1978. The theatre also collaborates on a range of public programmes promoting language, poetry, international cinema, documentaries, and the performing arts, many of which are offered free of charge.

== History ==
=== Prithvi Theatres ===
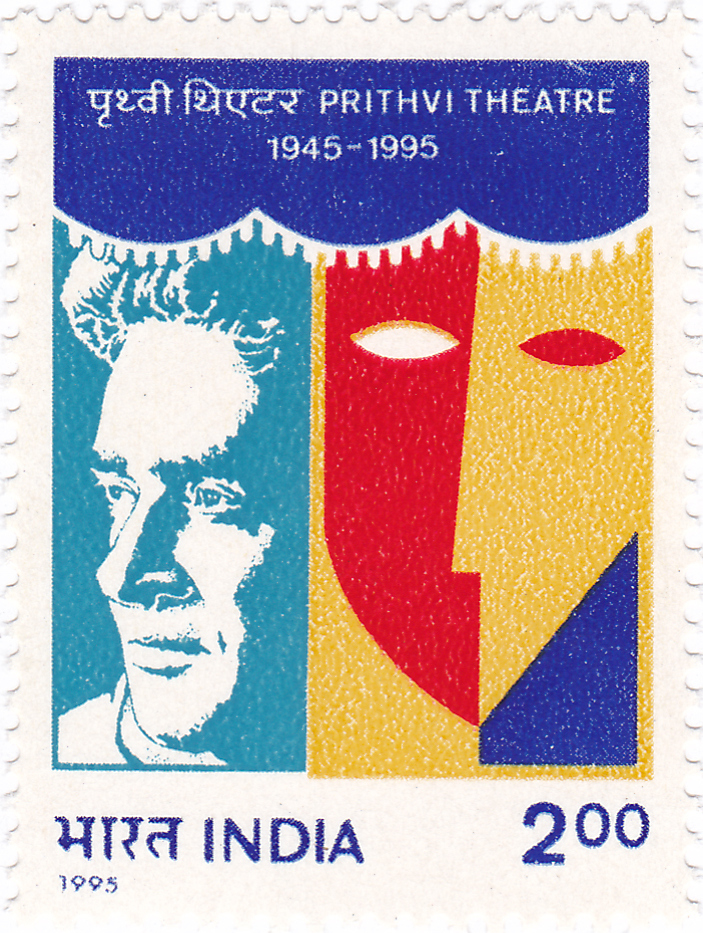
Prithvi Theatre and Prithviraj Kapoor, commemorative stamp released in 1995.

Prithvi Theatres, a travelling theatre company, was founded in 1942 by Prithviraj Kapoor. Established as a touring troupe of approximately 150 members, the company staged productions throughout India. Its inaugural production was Kalidasa's classical play Shakuntala. Over the following years, the company presented more than 2,600 performances of plays including Deewar (Wall), Pathan, Ghaddar (Traitor), Aahuthi (Offering), Kalaakar (Artist), Paisa (Money), and Kisaan (Farmer). Prithviraj Kapoor played the leading role in every production. His work in the Indian film industry funded the activities of the company

Prithviraj Kapoor's youngest son, Shashi Kapoor, trained as both an actor and a director with Prithvi Theatres. He later married Jennifer Kendal, the daughter of Laura and Geoffrey Kendal and a leading actress in their travelling theatre company, Shakespeareana. Shashi and Jennifer toured with both of their parents' companies, Prithvi Theatres and Shakespeareana. Their shared commitment to theatre, together with their respect for Prithviraj Kapoor's vision, eventually contributed to the establishment of a permanent theatre in his memory.

=== Re-emergence: 1978 onwards ===
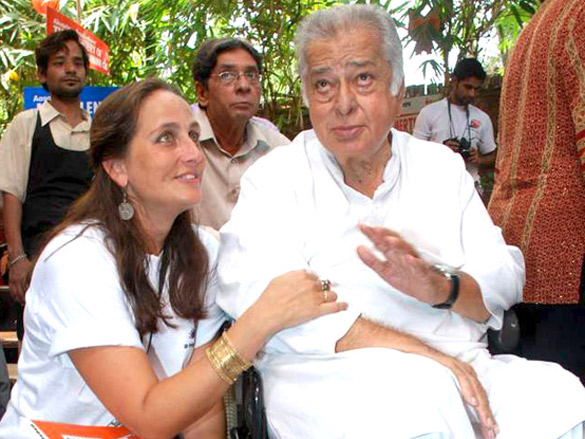
Sanjana Kapoor with founder and her father Shashi Kapoor at an event at Prithvi Theatre, 2010.

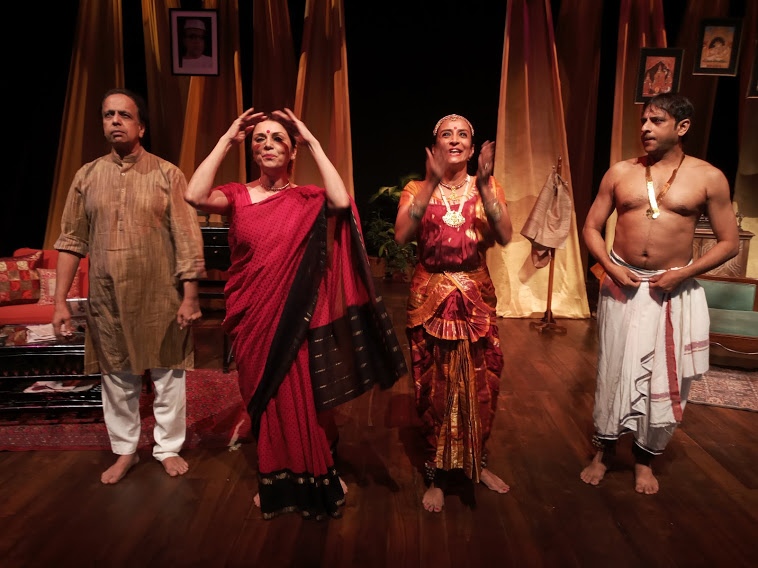
"Dance like a Man" performance with cast, Ananth Mahadevan, Lillete Dubey, Suchitra Pillai & Joy Sengupta, at Prithvi Theatre, 2021.

Prithviraj Kapoor’s dream was to have a permanent place for his theatre company. In 1962, he managed to lease a plot of land in Juhu on which to create a theatre space. Unfortunately, his ill-health and subsequent death in 1972 delayed his dream from turning into reality. The year he died, the lease on the land expired, and it was offered for sale to his family. Shashi Kapoor and his wife Jennifer decided to make Prithviraj’s dream a reality by buying the land from the Bajaj Trust and setting up the 'Shri Prithviraj Kapoor Memorial Trust & Research Foundation' in his memory with the intention of building a space to promote Hindi theatre and the performing arts.

The Prithvi Theatre building was designed by architect Ved Segan, with a 200-seater auditorium around an octagonal thrust stage. It was finally inaugurated on 5 November 1978 in Mumbai. "Udhwastha Dharmashala", written by G. P. Deshpande, staged by Naseeruddin Shah, Om Puri and Benjamin Gilani was Prithvi's first play. This was followed by a play by the Indian People's Theatre Association (IPTA), a political satire, "Bakri", directed by actor-director M. S. Sathyu.

Theatre in Mumbai at the time was dominated by amateur English theatre of South Mumbai, Gujarati farce and low-key Marathi theatre in Dadar. Hindi theatre was at an all-time low with few venues available. Prithvi Theatre offered Hindi theatre an affordable platform where new styles and forms could be experimented with, a new exciting venue for the performers, directors, writers of theatre in the city, and created a new audience for the genre. After some tough early years, the theatre picked up in the 1980s, and the Prithvi Cafe also gained popularity.

The theatre's fifth anniversary in 1983 was celebrated with a festival to showcase the best of Prithvi, an event considered a success with audience and critics alike. By now, the Prithvi Café, attached to the Theatre, had become a well-known meeting place for artists and art lovers.

Jennifer Kapoor died on 7 September 1984, but the theatre was not allowed to close on the day of her death, and the ‘show went on’ in true theatre tradition. Jennifer and Shashi's eldest son, Kunal Kapoor, with the help of theatre director Feroz Abbas Khan, who became the artistic director, took over the running of the theatre and even held a month-long Festival in February 1985, showcasing theatre from all over India. Ustad Zakir Hussain, of whom Jennifer was a great fan, performed on her birthday, 28 February, during the festival, along with Pandit Shivkumar Sharma. Ustad Zakir Hussain has continued to perform every year on this date at Prithvi – probably the only place where audience members can experience Indian classical music without amplification – in the classic style of a ‘baithak’ – as was traditionally performed. For the next 39 years, Hussain performed, curated and hosted the annual ‘Prithvi Memorial Concert’. In 2024, he performed with his brothers, percussionists Fazal Qureshi and Taufiq Qureshi, and it turned out to be his last concert as Hussain died in the same year on December 15.

In 1993, Jennifer’s daughter, Sanjana Kapoor, started to help her brother Kunal Kapoor in the running of the theatre and its various activities. Gradually, as she learned and grew with experience, she added a host of activities and workshops, ‘Prithvi Players’ and ‘Little Prithvi Players’ (Theatre for Children). She left her role as director after 2012 to focus on her travelling theatre company. Thereafter it is being managed by Kunal Kapoor and his children, actor Zahan Kapoor and Shaira Kapoor.

The Indian government issued a commemorative stamp in 1995 to mark 50 years of 'Prithvi Theatre'. Prithvi Theatre continues to flourish, providing a home for new talent and a source of inspiration to the theatre fraternity and audience with over 540 shows a year, Tuesday through Sunday.

== Prithvi Theatre Festival ==
Prithvi Theatre Festival (PTF) is the annual theatre festival of Prithvi Theatre. Started in 1978, it is organised each year around the birth anniversary of thespian Prithviraj Kapoor, which is on November 3. The fortnight-long festival is usually held from 1 to 17 November. It attracts plays from noted theatre groups from across India, as well as abroad and over the decades has become an important fixture in the cultural calendar of Mumbai city. The festival also hosts "StageTalk@Prithvi" sessions and a series of workshops led by industry experts.

In 2006, the annual festival celebrated the birth centenary of Prithviraj Kapoor, and was titled, "Kala Desh ki Sewa mein" (Art in service of the Nation).
