= Pita (1991 film) =

- Directed by: Govind Nihalani
- Written by: Govind Nihalani (screenplay) Mahesh Elkunchwar; August Strindberg (play)
- Starring: Vimal Bhagat, Satyadev Dubey, Dina Pathak, Irrfan and Shikha Rai
- Cinematography: Govind Nihalani
- Music by: Vanraj Bhatia
- Release date: 1991
- Running time: 150 minutes
- Country: India
- Language: Hindi

Pita is a 1991 Indian Hindi-language film based on Swedish playwright August Strindberg's 1887 play The Father. Directed by Govind Nihalani, the film stars Vimal Bhagat, Satyadev Dubey, Dina Pathak, Irrfan and Shikha Rai.

== Plot ==
In disagreement with her husband on how her daughter should be raised and what she should become, the central character of a woman thinks that if she declares her husband insane she would be able to decide for her daughter. Acting on this she sows seeds of confusion in the mind of his husband that he might not be the father of their daughter. The husband starts to believe and actually goes insane and his wife gets the custody of their daughter.

== Cast ==
- Vimal Bhagat
- Satyadev Dubey
- Dina Pathak
- Irrfan
- Shikha Rai
- Ganesh Yadav
- Kishore Kadam

== Background and themes ==
"Nihalani’s penchant for exploring the works of Western playwrights like Ibsen and Strindberg is reflected in his work for television, particularly the telefilms that he adapted to suit an Indian context.", recalled OutlookIndia in 2024. According to Gajra Kottary and Ridhi Sarda, the film addresses "the largely ignored problem" of "the mental and emotional abuse of men at the hands of women". "Vital to the play's psychological exposition, and given very careful treatment by Nihalani, is the central character's gradual loss of his sense of perspective", wrote John W. Hood.
