= Loha (1987 film) =

- Directed by: Raj N. Sippy
- Written by: Mohan Kaul-Ravi Kapoor (story); Kader Khan (screenplay)
- Produced by: Salim
- Starring: Dharmendra; Shatrughan Sinha; Karan Kapoor; Madhavi; Mandakini; Amrish Puri; Kader Khan
- Cinematography: Anwar Siraj
- Edited by: Waman Bhonsle; Gurudutt Shirali
- Music by: Laxmikant–Pyarelal
- Production company: Aftab Pictures
- Release date: 23 January 1987
- Running time: 160 minutes
- Country: India
- Language: Hindi
- Budget: ₹est.20.5 million
- Box office: ₹60 million

Loha (transl. Iron) is a 1987 Indian Hindi-language action thriller film directed by Raj N. Sippy. It features an ensemble cast of Dharmendra, Shatrughan Sinha, Karan Kapoor, Madhavi, Mandakini, Kader Khan and Amrish Puri.

Loha was released worldwide on 23 January 1987, coinciding with the Indian Republic Day weekend. The film received mainly positive reviews and was also a commercial success. It was the second hit for Dharmendra in 1987 and he would go on to give 5 more hits that year.

== Story ==
The plot centres around three men (Dharmendra, Sinha and Kapoor) who set out to save 25 hostages from a dreaded bandit (Puri) who is on the payroll of the local politician (Khan).

Honest and diligent Police Inspector Amar (Dharmendra) is a family man living in Bombay. In his attempt to arrest bandit Sher Singh (Amrish Puri), he and Inspector Dayal (Raza Murad) are attacked. Amar survives but Dayal's legs get crushed under a truck and he begins using a wheelchair.

When Amar arrests local politician Jagannath Prasad (Kader Khan), he is released without being charged while Amar is reprimanded and decides to resign. Sher Singh hijacks a bus and holds the passengers as hostages and demands the release of his 25 jailed associates from prison in exchange.

Inspector Dayal's granddaughter, Seema (Mandakini), is amongst them, and Dayal asks Amar for assistance. Amar, along with an ex-convict Qasim Ali (Shatrughan Sinha), and drug dealer Karan (Karan Kapoor) must rescue them, but differences crop up among the trio and they part ways. When Amar finds out that Qasim and Karan have double crossed him and masterminded a plan to facilitate the escape of the 25 convicts he must confront them.

== Cast ==
- Dharmendra as Senior Police Inspector Amar
- Shatrughan Sinha as Qasim Ali Barkat Ali Jung Shamsher Bahadur
- Madhavi as Anita
- Amrish Puri as Shera Singh
- Karan Kapoor as Karan
- Mandakini as Seema
- Vikas Anand as Senior Police Inspector Mohanlal Deshmukh
- Jugal Hansraj as Hassan Ali
- Kader Khan as Jagannath Prasad
- Raza Murad as Dayal
- Jagdish Raj as Police Commissioner Darshan
- Tej Sapru as Bhima
- Goga Kapoor as Kundan Singh
- Praveen Kumar as Mukhtar, Shera's man in prison
- Roopesh Kumar as Sameer Shera's man in prison
- Mac Mohan as Jagmohan, Shera's man in prison
- Ram Mohan as Rahim Chacha
- Moolchand as Man with a briefcase
- Yunus Parvez as Phoolchand, Shera's man in prison
- Joginder as Hakim, Shera's man in prison
- Anjan Srivastav as Champaklal
- Sudhir Jaichand, as Shera's man in prison
- Bhushan Tiwari Chiranjilal, as Shera's man in prison
- Shashi Kiran as Dang
- Ramesh Goyal as Prakash, Shera's man in prison

== Soundtrack ==
Farooq Kaiser wrote the lyrics.

1. "Tu Ladki Number One Hai" - Alka Yagnik, Shabbir Kumar
2. "Teri Hasti Hai Kya Jo Mitayega" - Anuradha Paudwal, Kavita Krishnamurthy, Shabbir Kumar
3. "Patli Kamar Lambe Baal" - Anuradha Paudwal, Kavita Krishnamurthy
4. "Saat Taalon Mein Rakh, Saat Pardo Me Rakh" - Kavita Krishnamurthy, Anuradha Paudwal
5. "Hum Gharibo Ne Tera" - Shailendra Singh, Suresh Wadkar, Mohammed Aziz

== Reception ==
ABP news stated "Directed by Raj N. Sippy and written by Ravi Kapoor and Mohan Kaul with dialogues by Kader Khan, Loha is a top-notch B Film with excellent production qualities and a cast filled with familiar faces that make the film a fun trip. The film’s campiness and its commitment to being extreme across all elements truly adorn it a perverse sophistication. Like in Wages of Fear where the terrain to transport the unstable nitroglycerine is treacherous and the unpredictability of the interpersonal relationship between the four men adds to the tension, Loha also tries to induce the same tension but the straightforwardness with which it attempts it keeps things superficial. There is hardly any tension between Amar and Qasim once the former learns that it’s Hassan for whom they are merrily breaking the law and similarly the volatility of the nitroglycerin is replicated by the stereotypical antics of the bunch playing the convicts who ranged from Joginder of the runaway cult classic Ranga Khush (1975), Sudhir, Mac Mohan, Praveen Kumar, Goga Kapoor, Tej Sapru, Roopesh Kumar and Yunus Parvez to name a few. Barring Dharmendra, who had a great year in 1987 with 8 super hits in a row, both Sinha and Kapoor, too, appear to be checking stereotypical boxes. Even before his first film Sultanat (1986) released, Karan Kapoor had become a popular model and while his debut film’s script included a brief backstory of him being born to foreign mother, nothing in Loha explained his blonde mane, which looked strange when he is speaking decently comprehensible Hindi. There is no real reason for Loha to enjoy a revival, but the film involuntarily enough created a template that would soon go on to be replicated eerily enough in real life. Made a few years before the famous Rubaiya Mufti kidnapping by JKLF (Jammu Kashmir Liberation Front) where separatists demanded the release of five comrades for the daughter of Mufti Mohammad Sayeed, the then Home Minister of India, the film’s plot seemed extremely implausible. Many had even forgotten Loha by the time the Rubaiya Mufti kidnapping took place and while no one mentioned Loha at that point, the kidnapping found an indirect mention in Mani Rathman’s Roja (1992). If Loha were to be made today there’s hardly any doubt that it would be glitzy and chic and no one might think of it a B film. After all both Rubaiya kidnapping and the Air India Flight 814 hijacking in 1999 by Harkat-ul-Mujahideen and the subsequent release of three militants – Mushtaq Ahmed Zargar, Ahmed Omar Saeed Sheikh, and Maulana Masood Azhar – in exchange for over 150 passengers prove that truth, too, could replicate a potboiler.
