= Kapoor family =

Indian film family

Kapoor Family
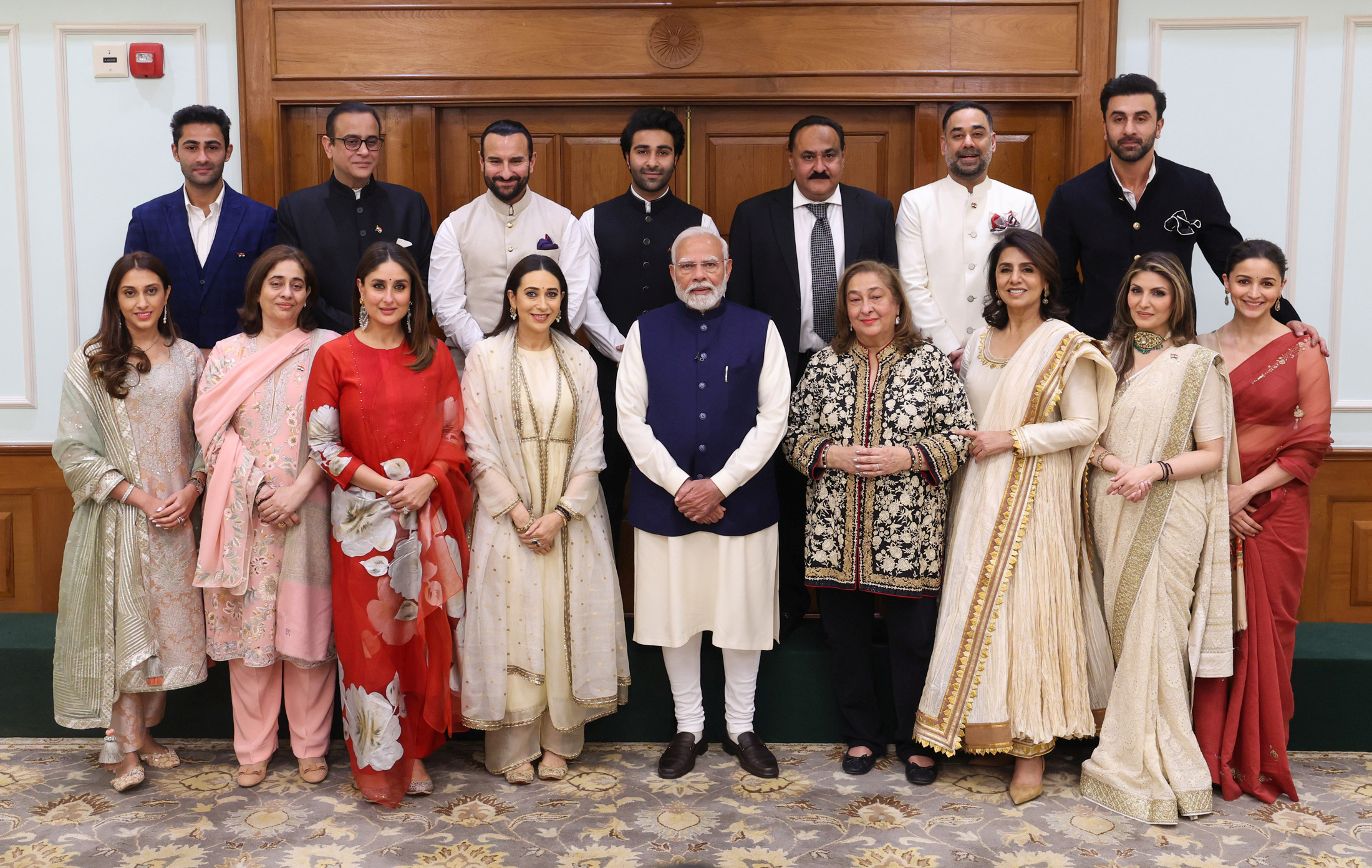
- Some members of the Kapoor family with the Prime Minister of India Narendra Modi in 2024
- Current region: Mumbai, India
- Origin: Samundri, British India
- Connected families: List: Bachchan family; Malhotra family; Pataudi family; Agha family; Sippy family; Bhatt family; Behl family; Gohil dynasty; Nanda family; Shivdasani family; Kendall family; Sial family
- Traditions: Punjabi Hindus
- Heirlooms: R. K. Studio; Prithvi Theatre
- Estate: List: Krishna Raj Bungalow Bandra, Mumbai, India; Rajbaug Farms, Loni Kalbhor, India (formerly); Kapoor Haveli, Peshawar, Khyber Pakhtunkhwa, Pakistan (formerly)
- Active since 1929; Prithviraj Kapoor acted in Alam Ara (1931), the first talkie film of India

The Kapoor family is a prominent Indian show business family with at least four generations of the family over 97 years being active in the Hindi film industry. Numerous members of the family, both biological and those who have married into the family, have had prolific careers as actors, film directors and producers. "The Pioneer" founder of the dynasty was "The Patriarch", Prithviraj Kapoor, who was the first member of family to begin acting in movies with his 1929 debut film Be Dhari Talwar. He was a pioneer of Indian theatre and the founding member of the Indian People's Theatre Association (IPTA). His son Raj Kapoor was the most influential actor and director in Hindi cinema. The genesis generation or the earliest linear generation of the Kapoor family tree to ever act in the films was Prithviraj Kapoor's father, Basheshwarnath Kapoor, who debuted as actor in 1951 film Awaara, which was produced, directed and starred in lead role by his grandson Raj Kapoor.

Due to their decades old participation in the Hindi film industry, the family is often called "The First Family of Bollywood". Prominent personalities related to the Kapoor family through marriage include Kumari Naaz, Jennifer Kendal, Geeta Bali, Neetu Singh, Babita, Valmik Thapar, Saif Ali Khan, Shweta Bachchan Nanda and Alia Bhatt.

== Background ==
Raghuvir rajmal kapoor
Rajvir mal kapoor
Murli Mal Kapoor
Keshavmal Kapoor
Basheshwarnath Kapoor
Generation 1
Prithviraj Kapoor · Trilok Kapoor · Kailash Kakkar
Generation 2 (Prithviraj Kapoor's children)
Raj Kapoor · Shammi Kapoor
Shashi Kapoor · Urmila Sial
Ravinder Kapoor · Devinder Kapoor
Generation 3 (Raj Kapoor's children)

Randhir Kapoor · Ritu Kapoor Nanda
Rishi Kapoor · Rima Kapoor Jain
Rajiv Kapoor
Generation 4 (Raj Kapoor's grandchildren)
Randhir Kapoor-Babita Shivdasani's children
Karisma Kapoor · Kareena Kapoor Khan
Ritu-Rajan Nanda's children
Nikhil Nanda · Nitasha Nanda
Rishi Kapoor-Neetu Singh's children
Riddhima Kapoor Sahni · Ranbir Kapoor
Rima-Manoj Jain's children
Armaan Jain · Aadar Jain
Generation 5 (Raj Kapoor's great-grandchildren)
Karisma Kapoor-Sanjay Kapur's children
Samaira Kapur · Kiaan Raj Kapur
Riddhima Kapoor-Bharat Sahni's children
Samara Sahni
Kareena Kapoor-Saif Ali Khan's children
Taimur Ali Khan · Jeh Ali Khan
Nikhil Nanda-Shweta Bachchan Nanda's children
Navya Naveli Nanda · Agastya Nanda
Ranbir Kapoor-Alia Bhatt's children
Raha Kapoor
Armaan Jain-Anissa Malhotra Jain's children
Rana Jain
Generation 3 (Shammi Kapoor's children)
Aditya Raj Kapoor · Kanchan Kapoor
Generation 4 (Shammi Kapoor's grandchildren)
Aditya Raj-Preeti Kapoor's children
Tulsi Kapoor · Vishwa Pratap Kapoor
Kanchan Kapoor-Ketan Desai's children
Pooja Desai · Raj Rajeshwari Desai
Generation 3 (Shashi Kapoor's children)
Kunal Kapoor · Karan Kapoor
Sanjana Kapoor
Generation 4 (Shashi Kapoor's grandchildren)
Kunal Kapoor-Sheena Sippy's children
Shaira Kapoor · Zahan Kapoor
Karan-Lorna Kapoor's children
Aliya Kapoor · Zach Kapoor
Sanjana-Valmik Thapar's children
Hamir Thapar
Generation 2 (Trilok Kapoor's children)
Vijay Kapoor Vicky Kapoor
Generation 2 (Kailash Kakkar's children)
Subbiraj

The Kapoor family is of Punjabi Hindu origin, belonging to the Kapoor Gotra of Khatri community.

Prithviraj Kapoor was the first from the family to pursue a career in films. His ancestral origins were in the town of Samundri in Lyallpur District of Punjab Province of British India. His father, Basheshwarnath Kapoor, served as a police officer in the Imperial Police in the city of Peshawar; while his grandfather, Keshavmal Kapoor, was a Tehsildar in Samundri. His younger brother, Trilok Kapoor also became an actor; with his first role in the film Char Darvesh in 1933, Trilok emerged as one of the most commercially successful actors of his era.

The family eventually migrated to Mumbai. Three of Prithviraj Kapoor's sons, Raj Kapoor, Shammi Kapoor and Shashi Kapoor made careers in the Hindi film industry. Raj Kapoor, also known as "the greatest showman of Indian cinema", became a noted Indian film actor, producer and director of Hindi cinema.

Raj Kapoor married Krishna Malhotra in 1946. She was the sister of actors Prem Nath, Rajendra Nath, and Narendra Nath, as well as Uma Chopra, the wife of Prem Chopra. They have 3 sons Randhir Kapoor, Rishi Kapoor, and Rajiv Kapoor and 2 daughters Ritu Nanda and Rima Jain.

Shammi Kapoor married actress Geeta Bali in 1955 and had 2 children with her, Aditya Raj Kapoor and Kanchan Kapoor. Geeta Bali died of smallpox in 1965. Shammi then married Neela Devi Gohil of the Gohil dynasty of the erstwhile Bhavnagar State in Gujarat in 1969.

Shashi Kapoor married Jennifer Kendal in 1958. They have two sons, Kunal Kapoor, Karan Kapoor and a daughter Sanjana Kapoor, all of them former actors in Hindi cinema. Jennifer died in 1984 from cancer.

Raj Kapoor's sons, Randhir Kapoor and Rishi Kapoor, went on to become well-known actors; his youngest son, Rajiv Kapoor, was not as successful as his brothers. Shashi Kapoor's children were unsuccessful in acting because of their European looks. His daughter, Sanjana Kapoor, ran the Prithvi Theatre from 1993 to February 2012, his elder son, Kunal Kapoor, runs an ad company, and Shashi's youngest child, Karan Kapoor, currently runs a photography company in London. Shammi Kapoor's son, Aditya Raj Kapoor, is an Indian actor, filmmaker, and retired businessman and his daughter Kanchan Kapoor is married to Ketan Desai, the son of Manmohan Desai.

Randhir Kapoor is married to Babita. They have two daughters Karisma Kapoor and Kareena Kapoor Khan, both of whom have found success in the film industry. Rishi Kapoor was married to actress Neetu Singh; their son, Ranbir Kapoor, has established himself as a leading Bollywood actor, and their daughter, Riddhima Kapoor Sahani, is a designer. Ranbir married British-Indian actress Alia Bhatt Kapoor in 2022. They have a daughter named Raha Kapoor who exactly resembles her grandfather Rishi and great-grandfather Raj Kapoor.

Nikhil Nanda, son of Ritu Kapoor, Raj Kapoor's daughter and Rajan Nanda, is married to Shweta Bachchan Nanda, daughter of the actors Amitabh Bachchan and Jaya Bachchan.

Prithviraj Kapoor's cousin was Surinder Kapoor who left Peshawar and came to Mumbai with help from Prithviraj Kapoor. who was married to Nirmal Kapoor. His oldest son is Boney Kapoor who was married to Mona Shourie and then to Sridevi and is the father of Arjun, Anshula, Janhvi, and Khushi. His middle son is Anil Kapoor who is married to Sunita Kapoor and is the father of Sonam (married to Anand Ahuja), Rhea (married to Karan Boolani) and Harshvardhan Kapoor. His youngest son is Sanjay Kapoor who is married to Maheep Sandhu and is the father of Shanaya and Jahaan Kapoor. His daughter is Reena Kapoor Marwah who is married to Sandeep Marwah of Marwah Films and Video Studios and is the mother of Mohit (married to Antara Motiwala) and Akshay Marwah (married to Aashita Relan).

Nandkishore Kapoor and his brothers, noted actors Kamal Kapoor and Ravindra Kapoor were maternal first cousins of Prithviraj Kapoor as their mothers were sisters. Nandkishore Kapoor was closely associated with Prithvi Theatres the travelling theatre company founded by Prithviraj Kapoor. He accompanied the company on its tours and was involved in the organisation of its touring performances. He was also associated with the Hindi film industry as a production professional and served as a production controller for Rajshri Productions. Nandkishore Kapoor had three children including Rameet Kapoor who married Padma Kapoor. Rameet and Padma's son Mohit Kapoor is a numismatist and author known for his work on Indian coins and monetary history. Through Mohit Kapoor, the Kapoor family has also been associated with the study and preservation of India's numismatic and historical heritage. Nandkishore Kapoor's brother, Kamal Kapoor was a noted filmactor and was famous for playing the role 'Narrang' in the 1978 blockbuster movie Don. Kamal Kapoor had five children including Kapil Kapoor and Madhu Behl who married Ramesh Behl. Madhu and Ramesh Behl's son is Goldie Behl, who is married to actress Sonali Bendre, thus the Behl family is related to the Kapoor family by marriage.

Veteran character actor Subbiraj was the son of Kailash Kakkar, the sister of Prithviraj Kapoor and thus a first cousin of Raj Kapoor, Shammi Kapoor and Shashi Kapoor. His wife was Kumari Naaz.

Raj, Shashi, and Shammi's maternal cousin, Juggal Kishore Mehra, was a singer and a part of the Agha family, and whose step-granddaughter is Salma Agha, an actress and singer.

== Photos of the notable members of the family ==
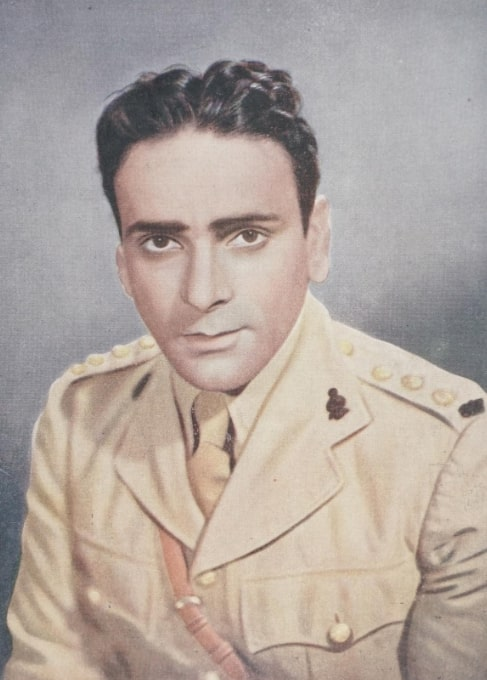
Prithviraj Kapoor

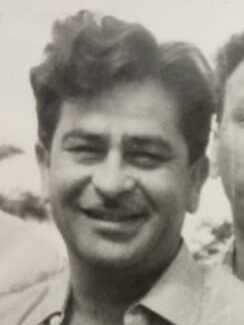
Raj Kapoor

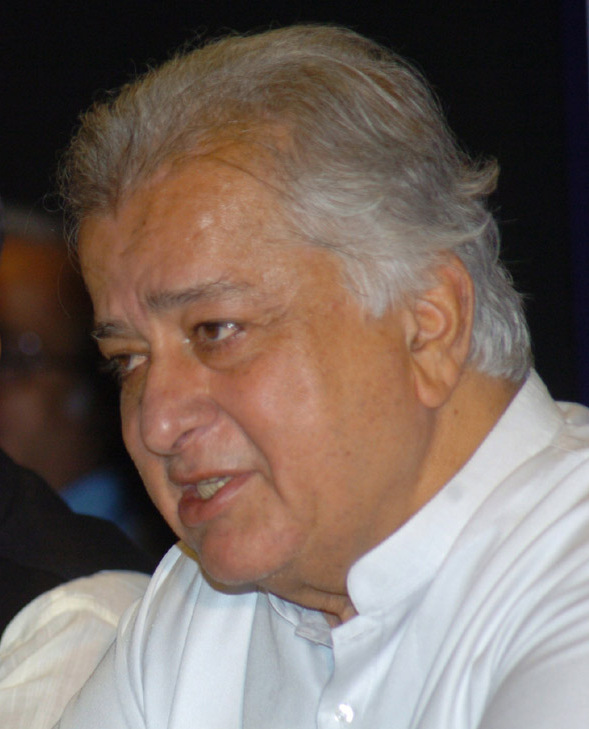
Shashi Kapoor

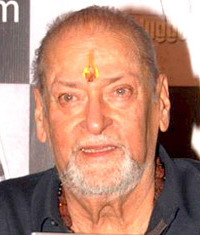
Shammi Kapoor

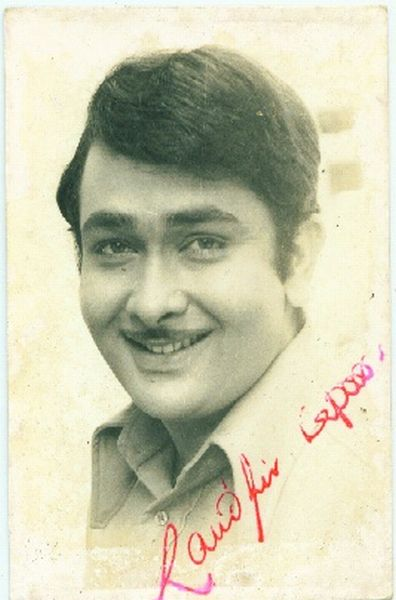
Randhir Kapoor

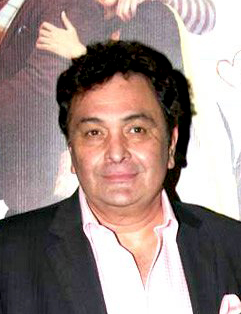
Rishi Kapoor

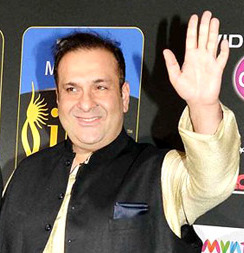
Rajiv Kapoor

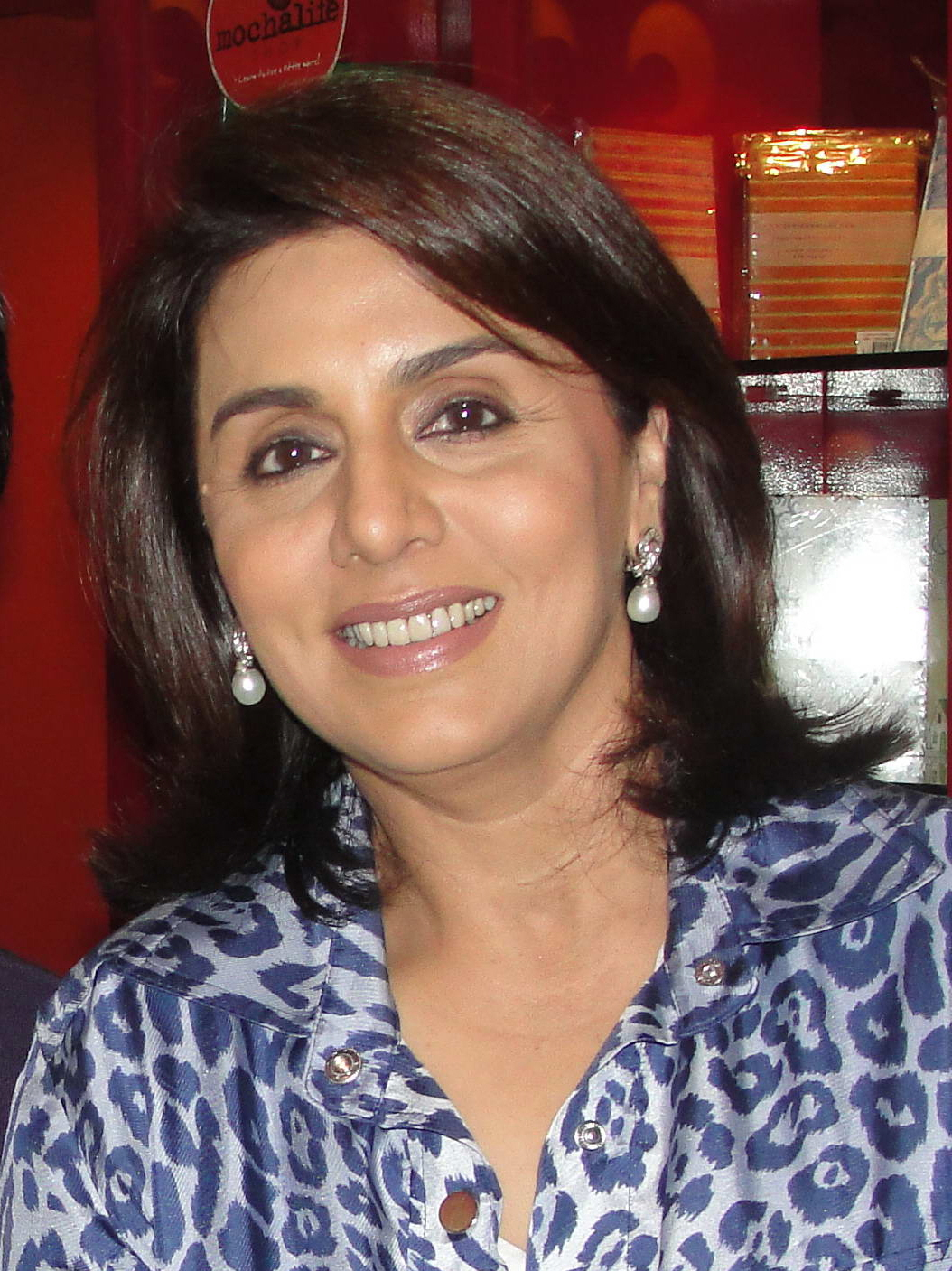
Neetu Kapoor

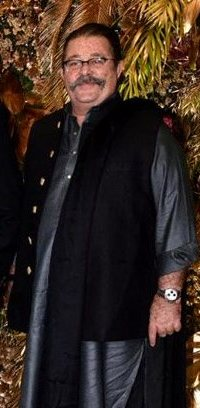
Kunal Kapoor

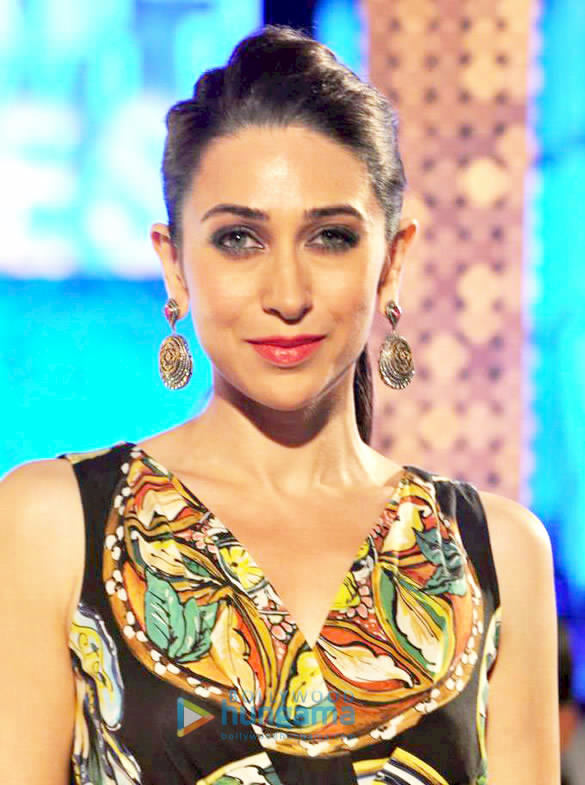
Karisma Kapoor

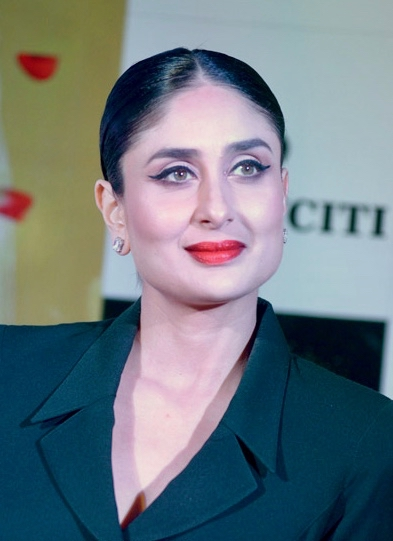
Kareena Kapoor

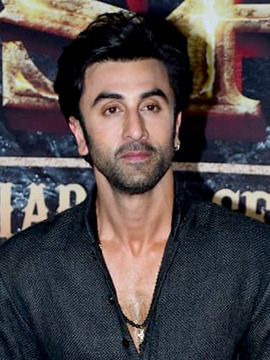
Ranbir Kapoor

== See also ==
- Kapoor Haveli
- List of Indian film families
