= Utsav =

- Movie poster
- Directed by: Girish Karnad
- Written by: Sharad Joshi (Dialogue)
- Screenplay by: Krishna Basrur; Girish Karnad
- Based on: Mrichakatika by Śūdraka
- Produced by: Shashi Kapoor
- Starring: Shashi Kapoor; Rekha; Anuradha Patel; Amjad Khan; Shankar Nag; Shekhar Suman
- Narrated by: Amjad Khan
- Cinematography: Ashok Mehta
- Edited by: Bhaudas Divakar
- Music by: Laxmikant-Pyarelal; Vasant Dev(lyrics)
- Production company: Film-Valas
- Release date: 21 December 1984
- Running time: 145 minutes
- Country: India
- Languages: Hindi; English

Utsav (English: Festival) is a 1984 Hindi erotic drama film, produced by Shashi Kapoor and directed by Girish Karnad. The film is based on play Mrichakatika (The Little Clay Cart) by Śūdraka. It was filmed in Hindi and English simultaneously, the post-production work of latter version was done in London.

The film stars Shashi Kapoor, Rekha, Amjad Khan, Shankar Nag, Shekhar Suman, Anuradha Patel, Anupam Kher, Neena Gupta, Kulbhushan Kharbanda, Annu Kapoor, Sanjana Kapoor and Kunal Kapoor.

The role of Samsthanak is played by Shashi Kapoor, who is also the producer of the movie. It was originally supposed to be played by Amitabh Bachchan. However, in July 1982, Bachchan met with a major accident in Bangalore. So the producer himself decided to step in. The film's music is by Laxmikant-Pyarelal and is noted for its songs like, 'Man Kyun Behka Re Behka Aadhi Raat Ko', a famous duet song by sisters Lata Mangeshkar and Asha Bhosle. Anuradha Paudwal's 'Mere Man Baja Mridang' for which she won the Filmfare Best Female Playback Award in 1985. Suresh Wadkar also has a song, 'Sanjh Dhale Gagan Tale'. The Central Board of Film Certification of India gave the film an "A" certificate on 23 August 1984.

== Overview ==
The film is an adaptation of Mṛcchakatika (The Little Clay Cart), a ten-act Sanskrit drama attributed to Śūdraka, an ancient playwright generally thought to have lived sometime between the second century BC and the fifth century AD. The prologue identifies him as a Kshatriya king and a devotee of the god Shiva who lived for a 100 years. The play is set in the ancient city of Ujjayini during the reign of the King Pālaka, near the end of the Pradyota dynasty that made up the first quarter of the fifth century BC.

== Plot ==
The story is about a courtesan, Vasantasena (Rekha), and her chance meeting with a poor Brahmin man, Charudatta (Shekhar Suman), in Ujjain.

== Cast ==
- Shashi Kapoor as Samsthanak
- Rekha as Vasantsena
- Amjad Khan as Vatsayana; narrator
- Shankar Nag as Sajjal
- Shekhar Suman as Charudutt
- Anuradha Patel as Aditi
- Kunal Kapoor as Aryak
- Sanjana Kapoor as a courtesan slave
- Kulbhushan Kharbanda as teacher of Aryak
- Neena Gupta as Madanika
- Anupam Kher as Samsthanak's friend
- Annu Kapoor as masseur
- Harish Patel as Maitreya
- Yunus Parvez as gambler
- Satish Kaushik as cart driver

== Production ==
The film was shot in Kolkebail, Karnataka in 1982–83. Producer Shashi Kapoor incurred a loss of Rs 1.5 crore after the film's release in 1984.

== Soundtrack ==
The film's soundtrack was composed by Laxmikant-Pyarelal and the lyrics were penned by Vasant Dev.

Song	Singer	Raga
"Man Kyun Behka"	Lata Mangeshkar, Asha Bhosle	Gorakh Kalyan
"Neelam Pe"	Lata Mangeshkar	Puriya Dhanashree
"Mera Man Baja Mridang"	Suresh Wadkar, Anuradha Paudwal, Aarti Mukherjee, Udit Narayan	
"Sanjh Dhale"	Suresh Wadkar	Bibhas

== Awards ==
Award	Category	Recipient	Result	Ref
32nd National Film Awards	Best Art Direction	Nachiket Patwardhan; Jayoo Patwardhan	Won	
33rd Filmfare Awards	Best Lyricist	Vasant Dev ("Mann Kyun Behka")	Won	
33rd Filmfare Awards	Best Female Playback Singer	Anuradha Paudwal ("Mere Man Baje Mridang")	Won	
33rd Filmfare Awards	Best actor in Comic Role	Amjad Khan	Nominated	
33rd Filmfare Awards	Best actor in Comic Role	Annu Kapoor	Nominated	
