= Shakespeare Wallah =

1965 film by James Ivory

- Theatrical release poster
- Directed by: James Ivory
- Written by: Ruth Prawer Jhabvala; James Ivory
- Produced by: Ismail Merchant
- Starring: Shashi Kapoor; Felicity Kendal; Madhur Jaffrey; Geoffrey Kendal; Partap Sharma
- Cinematography: Subrata Mitra
- Edited by: Amit Bose
- Music by: Satyajit Ray
- Release date: 1965
- Running time: 120 minutes
- Countries: United States; India
- Language: English

Shakespeare Wallah is a 1965 Merchant Ivory Productions film about a travelling family theatre troupe of English actors who perform Shakespeare plays in towns across India, amidst the rise of the Hindi film industry and a dwindling demand for their work.

The story and screenplay are by Ruth Prawer Jhabvala, the music was composed by Satyajit Ray, and Madhur Jaffrey's performance won her the Silver Bear for Best Actress at the 15th Berlin International Film Festival.

== Plot ==
Loosely based on the family of the real-life actor-manager Geoffrey Kendal and his travelling "Shakespeareana Company"–which earned him the Indian sobriquet "Shakespearewallah"–the film follows the story of a group of nomadic British actors as they perform Shakespeare plays in towns in post-colonial India, overseen by Tony Buckingham (Geoffrey Kendal) and his wife Carla (Laura Liddell). On their travels their daughter Lizzie Buckingham (Felicity Kendal) falls in love with rich playboy Sanju (Shashi Kapoor), who is also romancing Manjula (Madhur Jaffrey), a very popular Bollywood film star.

== Cast ==
- Shashi Kapoor as Sanju
- Felicity Kendal as Lizzie Buckingham
- Geoffrey Kendal as Tony Buckingham
- Laura Liddell as Carla Buckingham
- Madhur Jaffrey as Manjula
- Utpal Dutt as Maharaja
- Praveen Paul as Didi
- Prayag Raj as Sharmaji (as Prayag Raaj)
- Pinchoo Kapoor as Guptaji
- Jim D. Tytler as Bobby (as Jim Tytler)
- Hamid Sayani as Headmaster's Brother
- Marcus Murch as Dandy in 'The Critic'
- Partap Sharma as Aslam
- Jennifer Kendal as Mrs Bowen (uncredited)
- Ismail Merchant as Theater Owner (uncredited)

== Production ==
After the success of their first film, The Householder (1963), the team of Ivory and Merchant reunited with screenwriter Ruth Prawer Jhabvala and actor Shashi Kapoor for this film. Due to budget constraints, the film was shot in black and white, and the Kendal family play their own fictionalized counterparts, the Buckinghams.

== Reception ==
On the review aggregator website Rotten Tomatoes, 89% of 9 critics' reviews are positive, with an average rating of 6.5/10.

== Home media ==
The film was released on DVD from Odyssey, as well as in a boxset as part of the Merchant Ivory Collection of the Merchant Ivory Productions.
