= Sanjana Kapoor =

Indian actress

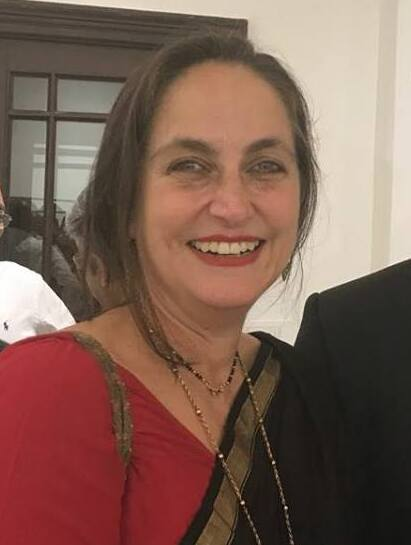
- Kapoor in 2017
- Born: 27 November 1967 (age 58); Mumbai, Maharashtra, India
- Occupations: Actor; theatre personality
- Spouse(s): Aditya Bhattacharya (divorced); Valmik Thapar (died 2025)
- Children: 1
- Parent(s): Shashi Kapoor; Jennifer Kendal
- Relatives: See Kapoor family

Sanjana Kapoor (born 27 November 1967) is an Indian theatre personality and former film actress. She is the daughter of actors Shashi Kapoor and Jennifer Kapoor. She ran the Prithvi Theatre in Mumbai from 1993 to February 2012.

== Biography ==
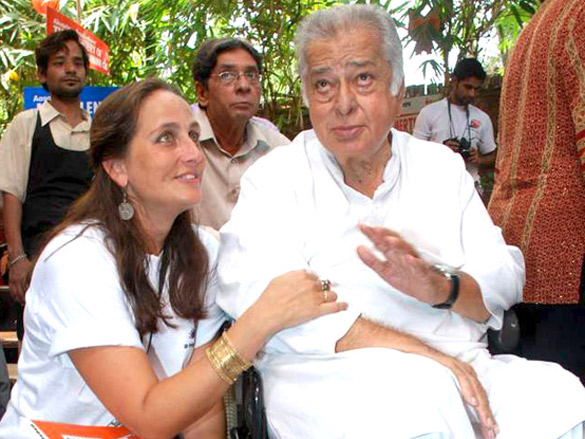
Sanjana Kapoor with father Shashi Kapoor

Sanjna Kapoor was born in the Kapoor family. Her paternal grandfather was Prithviraj Kapoor and her paternal uncles were Raj Kapoor and Shammi Kapoor. Her brothers Kunal Kapoor and Karan Kapoor have also acted in some films. Her maternal grandparents, Geoffrey Kendal and Laura Kendal, were actors who toured India and Asia with their theatre group, Shakespeareana, performing Shakespeare and Shaw. The Merchant Ivory film, Shakespeare Wallah, was loosely based on the family, which starred her father and her aunt, actress Felicity Kendal. Sanjana attended the Bombay International School in Mumbai.

She made her acting debut in the 1981 film 36 Chowringhee Lane which was produced by her father and starred her mother Jennifer Kendal in the lead. She played the younger version of the character her mother played. She later appeared in Utsav (1984), also produced by her father, and played her first leading role in a Bollywood film titled Hero Hiralal (1989), which was successful at the box office.

She then appeared in Mira Nair's critically acclaimed film Salaam Bombay in 1988 but has since quit acting in films, shifting her focus to theatre in the 1990s. In 1991, she played the role of the Japanese wife in the theatre Production of Akira Kurosawa's immortalised film Rashomon based on the Broadway play by Fay and Michael Kanin. She has also acted in A.K. Bir's Aranyaka (1994).

She hosted the Amul India Show on television for three and a half years.

She managed the Prithvi Theatre in Juhu, Mumbai and ran theatre workshops for children till 2011.

In 2011, she announced her decision to leave Prithvi Theatre, and launched Junoon Theatre in 2012, an arts based organization which would work with traveling groups; staging plays at smaller venues across India.

Sanjna Kapoor was awarded the French honour of Chevalier dans l'Ordre des Arts et des Lettres' (Knight of the Order of Arts and Letters) for her outstanding contribution to theatre in 2020.

== Personal life ==
Sanjana Kapoor has been married twice. Her first husband was actor and director Aditya Bhattacharya, son of filmmaker Basu Bhattacharya and Rinki Bhattacharya (daughter of filmmaker Bimal Roy).

Kapoor then married the tiger conservationist, Valmik Thapar, son of the journalist Romesh Thapar. Valmik was the nephew of JNU historian Romila Thapar (sister of Romesh Thapar). Sanjana and Valmik have a son together, Hamir Thapar born in 2002.

== Filmography ==
Year	Film	Role
1981	36 Chowringhee Lane	Young Violet
1984	Utsav	A courtesan slave in Vasantsena's house
1988	Salaam Bombay!	Foreign Reporter
1989	Hero Hiralal	Rupa
1994	Aranyaka	Elina
