= Vijeta (1982 film) =

- Directed by: Govind Nihlani
- Written by: Dilip Chitre; Satyadev Dubey
- Produced by: Shashi Kapoor
- Starring: Shashi Kapoor; Rekha; Amrish Puri; Kunal Kapoor; Supriya Pathak; Om Puri
- Cinematography: Govind Nihlani
- Edited by: Keshav Naidu
- Music by: Ajit Varman (songs and background score)
- Distributed by: Film-valas International
- Release date: 4 March 1982 (India)
- Running time: 151 minutes
- Country: India
- Language: Hindi

Vijeta (English: The Victor) is a 1982 Indian coming-of-age Hindi film produced by Shashi Kapoor and directed by Govind Nihalani. It stars Shashi Kapoor, his son Kunal Kapoor, Rekha, Amrish Puri and Supriya Pathak with K.K. Raina, Raja Bundela and Shafi Inamdar.

== Plot ==
Angad (Kunal Kapoor) is a confused teenager trying to find himself and is caught in between the marital problems of his Maharashtrian mother Neelima (Rekha) and Punjabi father Nihal (Shashi Kapoor), it is time for him to decide what he wants to do with his life. Angad chooses to join the Indian Air Force and become a fighter pilot. What follows is his struggle to become a victor both with his self and the outer world. Angad is attracted to Anna Varghese (Supriya Pathak), who is the daughter of his flying instructor Group Captain Varghese (Amrish Puri) a Malayali Syrian Christian. Angad must learn to adapt to flying, leaving his mom and dad for long periods of time, as well as try and woo Anna who helps him overcome his fears and realize his potential as a fighter pilot. Nihal is a clean-shaven Sikh, Neelima is a Hindu, Angad is a Sikh and Anna a Christian, while Angad's fellow officers represent all religions.

The film is notable for some rarely seen aerial photography of combat aircraft active with the IAF in the 1980s. The central character of Angad is a MiG-21 pilot and is shown flying the aircraft in the ground attack role in the Indo-Pakistani War of 1971. Much of the movie, including the climax involving a MiG-21, was shot at Pune. The IAF No.4 Squadron (the 'Oorials') provided the pilots and planes for the film's aerial sequences. The movie included good color footage of the Oorials aircraft in flight and in operation.

== Cast ==
- Shashi Kapoor as Nihal Singh
- Rekha as Neelima Singh
- Supriya Pathak as Anna Varghese
- Kunal Kapoor as Angad
- Madan Jain as Venkat Raju
- Raja Bundela as Aslam Khan
- K.K. Raina as Wilson
- Amrish Puri as Group Captain Varghese, the Chief Instructor
- Om Puri as Arvind
- Dina Pathak as Angad's grandmother
- Shafi Inamdar as Wing Commander Parulkar
- Sulabha Deshpande
- Capt Anup Ghosh as Squadron Leader
- Keith Stevenson as DeMonte

== Music ==
Vasant Dev wrote all the songs.

1. "Bichhurat Mose Kanha" - Parveen Sultana
2. "Man Aanand Aanand Chhaayo" - Asha Bhosle, Satyasheel Deshpande
3. "Man Base Mor Brindaban Ma" - Manna Dey

The song "Man Aanand Aanand Chhaayo" is set in raga Ahir Bhairav.

== Reception ==
Film World magazine rated the film "Good" and wrote, "Vijeta is perhaps the first film of its kind, a film which shows the Indian Air Force, its gallant men and their life in true colours." According to Asiaweek, "Vijeta is a tribute to the IAF in celebration of its golden jubilee last year". Users gave the movie 3.5 out of 5 stars on The Times of India.

== Awards ==
31st Filmfare Awards:

Won

- Best Cinematography – Govind Nihalani
- Best Sound Design – Hitendra Ghosh
- Best Editing – Keshav Naidu

== See also ==
- Tactics and Air Combat and Defence Establishment
- College of Air Warfare
- Topgun
