= Jennifer Kendal =

English actress (1934–1984)

- Kendal in the film Junoon (1978)
- Born: Jennifer Kendal; 28 February 1933; Southport, Lancashire, England
- Died: 7 September 1984 (aged 51); London, England
- Occupation: Actress
- Spouse: Shashi Kapoor (m. 1958)
- Children: Kunal Kapoor; Karan Kapoor; Sanjana Kapoor
- Parent(s): Geoffrey Kendal; Laura Liddell
- Relatives: Felicity Kendal (sister); See also Kapoor family

Jennifer Kendal Kapoor (28 February 1933 – 7 September 1984) was an English actress and the founder of the Prithvi Theatre. She was nominated for the BAFTA Award for Best Actress in a Leading Role for the film 36 Chowringhee Lane (1981). Her other film appearances included Bombay Talkie (1970), Junoon (1978), Heat and Dust (1983), and Ghare Baire (1984).

== Childhood ==
Jennifer Kendal was born in Southport, England, but spent much of her youth in India. She and younger sister Felicity Kendal were born to Geoffrey Kendal and Laura Liddell, who ran a travelling theatre company, Shakespeareana, which travelled around India as depicted in the book and film, Shakespeare Wallah (1965) in which Kendal appeared, uncredited, and which starred her husband Shashi Kapoor, her parents and her sister.

== Work and Shashi Kapoor ==
Shashi Kapoor and Kendal met for the first time in Calcutta, in 1956, where he was part of the Prithvi Theatre company, while she was playing Miranda in the play The Tempest, as part of Shakespeareana. Soon, Shashi Kapoor also began to tour with the Shakespeareana Company, and the couple married in July 1958. Kendal and her husband were also instrumental in the rejuvenation of Prithvi Theatre in Mumbai, with the opening of their theatre in the Juhu area of the city in 1978. Kendal and Kapoor also starred in a number of films together, particularly those produced by Merchant Ivory Productions. Their first joint starring roles were in Bombay Talkie (1970), which was also one of the earlier films produced by Merchant Ivory.

== Personal life ==
She had three children with her husband: sons Kunal Kapoor and Karan Kapoor, and daughter Sanjana Kapoor; all are former Hindi actors.

In 1982, she was diagnosed with terminal colon cancer and died of the disease in 1984.

== Filmography ==
=== Actress ===
- Shakespeare Wallah (1965) – Mrs Bowen (uncredited)
- Bombay Talkie (1970) – Lucia Lane
- Junoon (1978) – Miriam Labadoor (Ruth's Mother)
- 36 Chowringhee Lane (1981) Miss Violet Stoneham
- Heat and Dust (1983) – Mrs Saunders
- The Far Pavilions (1984) – Mrs Viccary
- Ghare-Baire (1984) – Miss Gilby (The Home and the World)
- Saptapadi (1961 Bengali film) - as Desdemona (voice-over)

=== Costume Design ===
- Mukti (1977)
- Junoon (1978)

== Awards ==
- 1980: Filmfare Award for Best Supporting Actress – Junoon – Nominated
- 1982: Evening Standard British Film Awards – Best Actress: 36 Chowringhee Lane – Won
- 1983: BAFTA Award for Best Actress in a Leading Role – 36 Chowringhee Lane – Nominated
