= Geoffrey Kendal =

English actor and theatre director (1909–1998)

- Born: Richard Geoffrey Bragg; 17 September 1909; Kendal, Westmorland, England
- Died: 14 May 1998 (aged 88)
- Occupations: Actor, theatre director
- Known for: Shakespeareana
- Spouse(s): Laura Liddell (1933–1992; her death)
- Children: Jennifer and Felicity Kendal

Geoffrey Kendal (7 September 1909 – 14 May 1998) was an English actor-manager and theatre director who delivered Shakespeare performances throughout India in the 1940s and 1950s.

== Early life and family ==
Born Richard Geoffrey Bragg in Kendal, Westmorland, at 5 Church View, Aynam Road, he took the name of his place of birth as his surname. He married the actress Laura Liddell in 1933; she died in England in 1992. The couple's two daughters, Jennifer (1934–1984) and Felicity Kendal (b. 1946), became successful actresses. His daughter, Jennifer, was married to Indian actor Shashi Kapoor, and had three children, Sanjana Kapoor, Kunal Kapoor and Karan Kapoor. His younger daughter, Felicity, was married to actor Drewe Henley and director Michael Rudman.

== Career ==
After attending theatre classes in Lancaster, Kendal joined repertory theatre companies which performed across small English towns. During one such tour, while in Merseyside, he met Laura Liddell, also an actress; subsequently they married at Gretna Green in 1933. After appearing with Entertainments National Service Association (ENSA) during the Second World War entertaining troops overseas, he along with his troupe performed in Hong Kong, Singapore and the backwaters of Malaya and Borneo, finally arriving in India in 1944.

Thereafter he made his living as an actor-manager leading the repertory theatre company "Shakespeareana" on tour throughout India in the 1940s and 1950s. They would perform Shakespeare before royalty one day, and in rural villages the next; many of their audiences were schoolchildren. Their story was loosely told by Merchant Ivory in their feature film Shakespeare Wallah (1965), in which he played the role of his fictionalized self, Tony Buckingham. He also acted in Shyam Benegal's Junoon (1978) and Aparna Sen's 36 Chowringhee Lane (1981), in which Jennifer Kendal was the lead, while he played her elder brother.

Kendal's life story, The Shakespeare Wallah: the Autobiography of Geoffrey Kendal, co-authored by Clare Colvin, was published in 1986. In 1990, he and Laura Kendal were given a joint Sangeet Natak Akademi Award in "Theatre – Direction" given by Sangeet Natak Akademi, India's National Academy for Music, Dance and Theatre.

He died on 14 May 1998, aged 88.

== Works ==
- Geoffrey Kendal; Clare Colvin (1987). Shakespeare Wallah: Autobiography. Penguin Books. ISBN 0140096841.
