= Govind Nihalani =

Indian film director

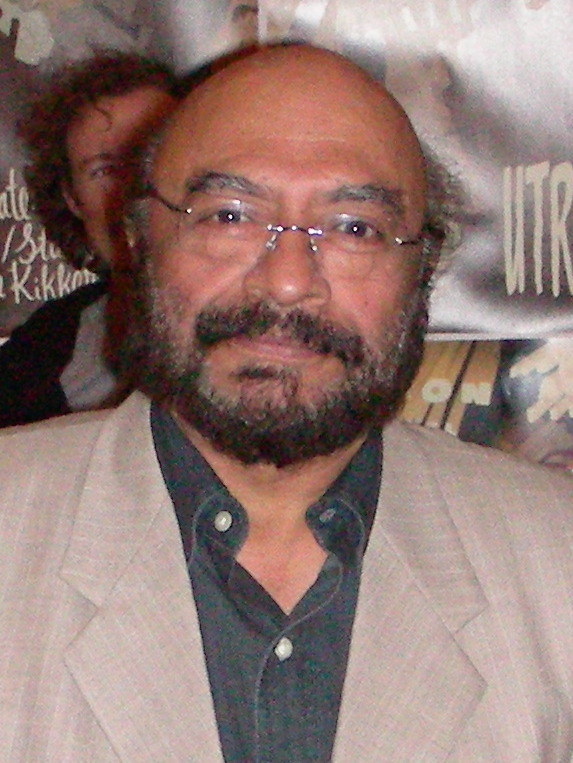
- Nihalani in 2006
- Born: 19 December 1940 (age 85); Karachi, Sindh, British India (in present-day Pakistan)
- Years active: 1962–present

Govind Nihalani (born 19 December 1940) is an Indian film director, cinematographer, screenwriter and producer, known for his works in Hindi cinema, particularly the movement of parallel cinema. He has been the recipient of six National Film Awards, and five Filmfare Awards.

== Early life ==
Nihalani was born on 19 December 1940 in Karachi, Sindh province (now in Pakistan) and his family migrated to India during the partition of 1947.

He graduated in cinematography from the Shree Jaya Chamrajendra polytechnic (the present Government Film and Television Institute) in Bangalore in 1962.

== Career ==
He started his career as an assistant cinematographer to V. K. Murthy, post which he made his debut as a cinematographer. He was associated with all the earlier films of Shyam Benegal and with the cinematography of Richard Attenborough's Oscar-winning period biographical drama Gandhi (1982). In the film Gandhi, he served as an uncredited second unit director, playing a key role in shooting significant scenes such as the massive funeral procession of Gandhi. Nihalani and Benegal are well known for their socially relevant films.

His first directorial venture was the legal drama Aakrosh, starring Om Puri, Naseeruddin Shah, Smita Patil and Amrish Puri in lead roles. The film was scripted by noted Marathi playwright Vijay Tendulkar. The film won the Golden Peacock for best film at the International Film Festival of India held in New Delhi in 1981. He then directed Ardh Satya, a 1983 film based on a story by S. D. Panwalkar.

In 1996, his script for Drohkaal was adapted by Kamal Haasan for its Tamil remake, Kuruthipunal, which subsequently became India's official entry for the 68th Academy Awards Best Foreign Language Film category.

In 1997, he adapted Bengali novelist Mahasweta Devi's acclaimed novel by the same name to Hazaar Chaurasi Ki Maa.

== Literary works ==
- Encyclopaedia of Hindi Cinema, by Govind Nihalani, Saibal Chatterjee, Gulzar. Popular Prakashan, 2003.

== Awards ==
Civilian honor

- Padma Shri (2002)

National Film Awards

- National Film Award for Best Cinematography - Junoon (1979)
- National Film Award for Best Feature Film in Hindi (director) - Aakrosh (1980)
- National Film Award for Best Feature Film in Hindi (director) - Ardh Satya (1983)
- National Film Award for Best Feature Film in Hindi (director) - Drishti (1990)
- National Film Award for Best Feature Film in Hindi (director) - Hazaar Chaurasi Ki Maa (1998)
- Nargis Dutt Award for Best Feature Film on National Integration - Tamas (1988)

Filmfare Awards

- Filmfare Best Cinematographer Award- Junoon (1979)
- Filmfare Best Cinematographer Award- Vijeta (1983)
- Filmfare Best Director Award - Aakrosh (1981)
- Filmfare Best Movie Award - Ardh Satya (1984)
- Filmfare Best Director Award - Ardh Satya (1984)
- Filmfare Critics Award for Best Movie - Dev (2004)

== Filmography ==
Film
Year	Title	Director	Cinematographer	Writer	Notes	Ref.
1974	Ankur	No	Yes	No		
1975	Nishant	No	Yes	No		
1976	Manthan	No	Yes	No		
1977	Bhumika	No	Yes	No		
1978	Kondura	No	Yes	No	Hindi-Telugu bilingual film	
1978	Junoon	No	Yes	No		
1980	Aakrosh	Yes	Yes	No		
1981	Kalyug	No	Yes	No		
1982	Vijeta	Yes	Yes	No		
1982	Arohan	No	Yes	No		
1983	Ardh Satya	Yes	Yes	No		
1983	Godam	No	Yes	No		
1984	Party	Yes	Yes	Yes	Based on the play by Mahesh Elkunchwar	
1985	Aghaat	Yes	Yes	No		
1988	Tamas	Yes	Yes	Yes	Based on the book by Bhisham Sahni	
1990	Drishti	Yes	Yes	Yes		
1991	Pita	Yes	Yes	Yes		
1991	Rukmavati Ki Haveli	Yes	Yes	Yes		
1991	Jazeere	Yes	Yes	Yes	Television film; Based on Henrik Isben' Play - Little Eyolf	
1994	Drohkaal	Yes	Yes	Yes		
1996	Sanshodhan	Yes	Yes	Yes		
1996	Kuruthipunal	No	No	story	Tamil language remake of Drohkaal	
1998	Hazaar Chaurasi Ki Maa	Yes	Yes	Yes	Also producer; Based on book by Mahasweta Devi	
1999	Thakshak	Yes	No	Yes	Also producer	
2001	Deham	Yes	Yes	Yes		
2004	Dev	Yes	Yes	Yes	Also producer	
2017	Ti Ani Itar	Yes	Yes	Yes	Marathi language film	
2019	Up Up and Up	Yes	No	No	Direct-to-video	
