= Kapoor =

Indian Khatri clan

- Language: Punjabi; Hindko; Hindustani (Hindi–Urdu)

Origin
- Region of origin: Punjab

Other names
- Variant forms: Kapur, Capoor

Kapoor or Kapur (Punjabi: کپور (Shahmukhi); ਕਪੂਰ (Gurmukhi), IPA: [kəpuːɾ]) is a Punjabi surname of Khatri clan found among the Punjabi Hindu, Muslim and Sikh communities.

== Notable people ==
Notable people bearing the name Kapoor include:

=== Academia ===
- Anuradha Kapur (born 1951), Indian theatre director and professor at the National School of Drama
- Arnav Kapur, American computer scientist and engineer
- Deepak Kapur (born 1950), Indian-American computer scientist and professor
- Devesh Kapur, Indian-American scholar and author
- Ilan Kapoor (born 1959), Indian postcolonial scholar
- Jagdish Chandra Kapur (1920–2010), Indian social scientist, entrepreneur and the founder of Kapur Surya Foundation
- Kapil Kapoor (born 1940), Indian scholar of linguistics and literature and an authority on Indian intellectual traditions at JNU
- Mahendra Nath Kapur (1910–1994), Indian educator served as the Principal of Modern School, New Delhi, for thirty years
- Neera Kapur Badhwar, Indian philosopher and professor
- Pradeep Kumar Kapur (born 1954), Indian academic and diplomat
- Ratna Kapur (born 1959), Indian law professor and former director of the Centre for Feminist Legal Research in New Delhi, India
- Shitij Kapur, Indo-British doctor and administrator
- Shiv G. Kapoor, Indian-American professor at the University of Illinois
- S. Paul Kapur, American scholar, professor and administrator
- Sudarshan Kapoor, Indian-American professor emeritus, California State University
- Sukhbir Singh Kapoor (born 1935), Indian writer and educator
- V. K. Kapoor, Vice Chancellor of Raffles University, Neemrana, Rajasthan

=== Activists ===
- Jaidev Kapoor (1908–1994), Indian freedom fighter who worked for the Hindustan Republican Association along with Chandra Shekhar Azad
- Jawahir Singh Kapur (1858–1910), Sikh activist, social reformer and writer
- Nita Kapoor (born 1956), Indian-Norwegian activist. She has worked extensively on immigrants' issues in Norway and women's issues globally.
- Shruti Kapoor, Indian economist, women's rights activist, and social entrepreneur
- Sunil Kapoor (1989–2025), Indian jeweller and activist

=== Army ===
- Deepak Kapoor (born 1948), Indian general and former chief of Army staff
- G. S. Kapoor (1915–2001), Indian Navy commander
- H. L. Kapur (1923–2020), former Air Vice Marshal of Indian Air Force and a member of the Indian National Congress
- Nagesh Kapoor, Indian air marshal
- Raj Kumar Kapoor (1932–2019), Indian colonel, film director and producer
- Rakesh Kapoor, Indian general
- Ravi Gopal Krishana Kapoor, Indian air marshal
- Sanjeev Kapoor (air marshal), Air Marshal in the Indian Air Force

=== Artists ===
- Anish Kapoor (born 1954), British - Indian sculptor, creator of Cloud Gate
- Atul Kapoor (born 1966), Indian voice artist who gave the voice of Bigg Boss
- Anita Kapoor, Indo-Singaporean television presenter
- D. S. Kapoor (born 1954), Indian art historian and educator
- Gaurav Kapur (born 1981), Indian actor and cricket presenter
- Geeta Kapur (born 1943), noted Indian art critic, art historian and curator based in New Delhi; one of the pioneers of critical art writing
- Mohan Kapur, Indian voice artist who gave the Hindi voice of the MCU's Dr. Strange

=== Authors ===
- Deepti Kapoor (born 1980), Indian author and journalist
- Kanhaiya Lal Kapoor (1910–1980), Urdu satirist
- Manju Kapur, Punjabi novelist
- Narinder Singh Kapoor (born 1944), Punjabi writer
- Pramod Kapoor (born 1953), Indian writer and publisher
- Rta Kapur Chishti, Indian historian and scholar
- Shaukat Riaz Kapoor (commonly known as Salik Lucknawi, 1913–2013), Punjabi Muslim journalist and Urdu poet
- Seema Kapoor, Indian filmmaker and writer

=== Bureaucrats and politicians ===
- Ajay Kapoor (politician) (born 1967), Indian politician
- Anita Kapur, Indian IRS officer. She is the former Chairperson of the Central Board of Direct Taxes (CBDT)
- Harbans Kapoor (1946–2021), Indian politician
- Jagdish Capoor, Indian banker and administrator
- Jaspat Roy Kapoor (1896–1984), Indian politician. He was a Member of Parliament, representing Uttar Pradesh.
- Kishan Kapoor (1951–2025), Indian politician and parliamentarian
- Mudassar Hussain Kapoor (born 1976), Pakistani Punjabi-origin Norwegian politician
- Pavan Kapoor (born 1966), Indian diplomat
- Pooja Kapur, Indian Ambassador to the Kingdom of Denmark. She was formerly the Indian Ambassador to the Republic of Bulgaria and North Macedonia
- Sanjay Kapoor (politician) (born 1962), Indian politician and a member of the 16th Legislative Assembly of Uttar Pradesh
- Sat Pal Kapur (1931–2007), Indian politician
- Savita Kapoor, Indian politician
- Sheila Kapur Dikshit (1938–2019), Indian politician and the longest serving Chief Minister of Delhi
- Vijai Kapoor, Indian bureaucrat
- Yashpal Kapur (1929–1993), leader of the Indian National Congress and a close aide of Indira Gandhi

=== Businessmen ===
- Amit Kapur, American-born internet entrepreneur. He is the co-founder of WhoCo and Gravity. Served as COO of MySpace
- B. K. Kapur, Indian businessman and former chairman of Hindustan Aeronautics Limited
- Jagdish Capoor, Indian banker
- John Kapoor, American multi-millionaire, pharmaceutical entrepreneur, former CEO of Insys Therapeutics
- Mike Kapur (born 1962), British entrepreneur
- Rakesh Kapoor (born 1958), Indian businessman, former chief executive officer of Reckitt Benckiser
- Rakhee Kapoor Tandon (born 1986), Indian business entrepreneur and venture capitalist
- Rana Kapoor (born 1957), Indian banker and the founder of Yes Bank
- Ritu Kapur, CEO of Quintillion Media, which jointly owns BloombergQuint with Bloomberg L.P. She is the co-founder of The Quint and Network18.
- Subhash Kapoor, Indian art dealer and smuggler
- Sunjay Kapur (1971–2025), Indian industrialist and billionaire
- Vimal Kapur, Indian-American executive

=== Chefs ===
- Kunal Kapur (born 1979), Indian celebrity chef and restaurateur known for hosting and judging MasterChef India.
- Sanjeev Kapoor (born 1964), Indian celebrity chef

=== Directors and producers ===
- Bharat Kapoor (born 1940), Indian director, writer, producer
- Boney Kapoor (born 1953), Indian film director and producer, son of Surinder Kapoor
- J. K. Kapur (1927–2004), Indian filmmaker, producer, activist and restaurateur
- Jyoti Kapur Das, Indian director and script writer
- Mona Shourie Kapoor (1964–2012), Indian producer and entrepreneur
- Rajit Kapur (born 1963), Indian film and theater actor and director
- Rhea Kapoor (born 1987), film producer, daughter of Anil Kapoor
- Nitin Kapoor (1959–2017), Indian producer
- Shekhar Kapur (born 1945), Indian filmmaker
- Shobha Kapoor (born 1949), Indian television and film producer
- Siddharth Roy Kapur (born 1974), Indian actor and producer
- Subhash Kapoor, Indian film director, producer and screenwriter
- Surinder Kapoor (1925–2011), Indian film producer

=== Film and TV actors ===
- Abhishek Kapoor (born 1971), Indian actor, director and producer
- Abhinav Kapoor (born 1984), Indian actor
- Aditya Raj Kapoor (born 1956), Indian actor and filmmaker from the Kapoor family
- Aditya Roy Kapur (born 1985), Indian actor
- Akansha Ranjan Kapoor (born 1993), Indian-American actress
- Akhil Kapur (born 1985), Indian actor
- Akshay Kapoor (born 1980), Indian actor
- Akshita Kapoor, Indian actress
- Anil Kapoor (born 1956), Indian actor and film producer, son of Surinder Kapoor
- Anupriya Kapoor (born 1990), Indian television actress
- Annu Kapoor (born 1956), Indian actor
- Arjun Kapoor (born 1985), Indianon of Boney Kapoor and Mona Shourie Kapoor
- Ayesha Kapur (born 1994), German former actress of Indian descent
- Babita Kapoor (born 1947), Indianf Randhir Kapoor
- Dhiraj Vinod Kapoor (born 1978), Indian model and actor
- Ekta Kapoor (born 1975), Indian producer of television shows and movies
- Harsh Varrdhan Kapoor (born 1990), Indian actor
- Gautami Kapoor, Indian television actress and model
- Goga Kapoor (1940–2011), Indian actor
- Janhvi Kapoor (born 1997), Indian actress
- Jayasudha Kapoor (born 1958), Indian actress, wife of Nitin Kapoor
- Jeetendra Kapoor (born 1942), Indian actor
- Kamal Kapoor (1920–2010), Indian actor
- Kanikka Kapur (born 1995), Indian actress and model
- Karan Kapoor (born 1962), Indian actor and model, son of Shashi Kapoor
- Kareena Kapoor (born 1980), Indian actress
- Karisma Kapoor (born 1974), Indian actress
- Kashika Kapoor (born 2006), Indian actress and model
- Kavita Kapoor, Indian actress
- Khushi Kapoor (born 2000), Indian actress
- Kishore Namit Kapoor (born 1949), Indian actor and film-acting trainer
- Kunal Kapoor (actor, born 1959), India actor, son of Shashi Kapoor
- Kunal Kapoor (actor, born 1977), Indian actor
- Kunal Karan Kapoor (born 1982), Indian actor
- Kunaal Roy Kapur (born 1979), Indian actor
- Leena Kapoor, Indian actress and model
- Malini Kapoor, Indian actress
- Mallika Kapoor, Indian actress
- Neha Kapur (born 1983), Indian model and Femina Miss India Universe 2006
- Omkar Kapoor, Bollywood actor
- Pankaj Kapur (born 1954), Indian actor and filmmaker
- Pinchoo Kapoor (1927–1989), Indian actor
- Prithviraj Kapoor (1906–1972), Indian theatre and Hindi film industry entrepreneur, patriarch of the Kapoor family of entertainers
- Raj Kapoor (1924–1988), Indian producer and director, son of Prithviraj Kapoor
- Rajat Kapoor, Indian actor, writer and director
- Rajiv Kapoor (1962–2021), Indian actor, son of Raj Kapoor
- Ram Kapoor (born 1973), Indianctor and model
- Ranbir Kapoor (born 1982), Indian actor, son of Rishi Kapoor
- Randhir Kapoor (born 1947), Indian actor, son of Raj Kapoor
- Ravi Kapoor (born 1969), British actor
- Ravindra Kapoor (1940–2011), Indian actor
- Reena Kapoor, Indian actress
- Rishi Kapoor (1952–2020), Indian actor, son of Raj Kapoor
- Sanjana Kapoor (born 1967), Indian actress, theatre-person, owner of Prithvi Theatre
- Sanjay Kapoor (born 1965), Indian actor, son of Surinder Kapoor
- Seerat Kapoor (born 1993), Indian actress, model, choreographer and dancer
- Shahid Kapoor (born 1981), Indian actor, son of Pankaj Kapur
- Shakti Kapoor (born 1952), Indian actor and comedian
- Shalini Kapoor, Indian actress
- Shammi Kapoor (1931–2011), Indian actor
- Sharad Kapoor (born 1976), Indian actor
- Shraddha Kapoor (born 1987), Indian actress, daughter of Shakti Kapoor
- Shashi Kapoor (1938–2017), Indian actor
- Shivani Kapoor, British model
- Shobu Kapoor, British actress of Indian descent
- Siddhanth Kapoor (born 1984), Indian actor and assistant director, son of Shakti Kapoor
- Sohaila Kapur, Indian actress and writer
- Sonam Kapoor (born 1985), Bollywood actress
- Sonia Kapoor, Indian actress
- Sridevi Kapoor (1963–2018), Indian actress and film producer
- Swati Kapoor, Indian actress and model
- Trilok Kapoor (1912–1988), Indian actor, brother of Prithviraj Kapoor
- Tusshar Kapoor (born 1976), Indian actor
- Vaani Kapoor (born 1988), Indian actress and model
- Varun Kapoor (born 1986), Indian actor
- Vinod Kapoor, Indian actor
- Yukti Kapoor (born 1992), Indian actress
- Zahan Kapoor (born 1992), Indian film actor, model and theatre personality

=== Journalists ===
- Akash Kapur, Indian-American journalist and author
- Coomi Kapoor, Indian journalist

=== Science and technology ===
- Anuja Trehan Kapur (born 1975), Indian criminal psychologist
- Kishen Singh Kapoor (1873–1936), Indian mathematician, author and teacher.
- Raman Kapur, Indian medical acupuncturist, author and the president of the Indian Society of Medical Acupuncture.
- Shyam Sunder Kapoor (born 1938), Indian nuclear physicist and a former director of the Bhabha Atomic Research Centre

=== Singers and dancers ===
- Geeta Kapoor (born 1973), Indian choreographer and television personality
- Himani Kapoor (born 1988), Indian singer and finalist of Sa Re Ga Ma Pa Challenge 2005
- Kanika Kapoor (born 1978), Indian singer
- Mahendra Kapoor (1934–2008), Indian singer
- Meena Kapoor (1930–2017), Indian singer
- Raman Kapoor, Indian singer and songwriter. He was a contestant on the TV shows Sa Re Ga Ma Pa and Rising Star.
- Sez on the Beat, stage name of Sajeel Kapoor, Indian music composer and producer
- Sneha Kapoor (born 1986), Indian salsa dancer, choreographer, and instructor
- Steven Kapur (born 1967), also known as "Apache Indian", British pop singer

=== Sportspersons ===
- Aashish Kapoor (born 1971), Indian cricketer
- Jagdish Singh Kapoor (born 1947), Ugandan field hockey player who competed in the men's tournament at the 1972 Summer Olympics
- Kunal Kapoor (cricketer) (born 1987), Indian cricketer
- Raag Kapur (born 1999), Hong Kong cricketer
- Ranjin Singh (Dave Kapoor) (born 1975), Indian-American wrestler
- Raunaq Kapur (born 2004), Hong Kong cricketer
- Rohan Kapoor (born 1997), Indian badminton player
- Shiv Kapur (born 1982), Indian golfer
- Sushil Kapoor (born 1939), Indian cricketer
- Upkar Singh Kapoor (born 1937), Ugandan field hockey player who competed in the men's tournament at the 1972 Summer Olympics.
- Vani Kapoor, Indian golfer

== Fictional characters ==
- Gita Kapoor, a character in the British TV drama EastEnders
- Kelly Kapoor, a character in the US TV show The Office
- Sanjay Kapoor (EastEnders), a character in the British TV drama EastEnders
- Sharmilla Kapoor, a character in the British TV drama EastEnders
- Ajay Kapoor (Neighbours), a character in the soap opera Neighbours
- Priya Kapoor, a character in the soap opera Neighbours
- Rani Kapoor, a character in the soap opera Neighbours
- Vincent Kapoor, a character in the movie The Martian
- Venkat Kapoor, a character in the novel by Andy Weir The Martian

== See also ==
- Kapoor family, Indian family
- Garhi Kapoora, town in Mardan, Khyber Pakhtunkhwa
- Kapurpur, Pakistan
- Kapoor Haveli
