= Sunjay Kapur inheritance dispute =

Indian High Profile legal dispute

Sunjay Kapur
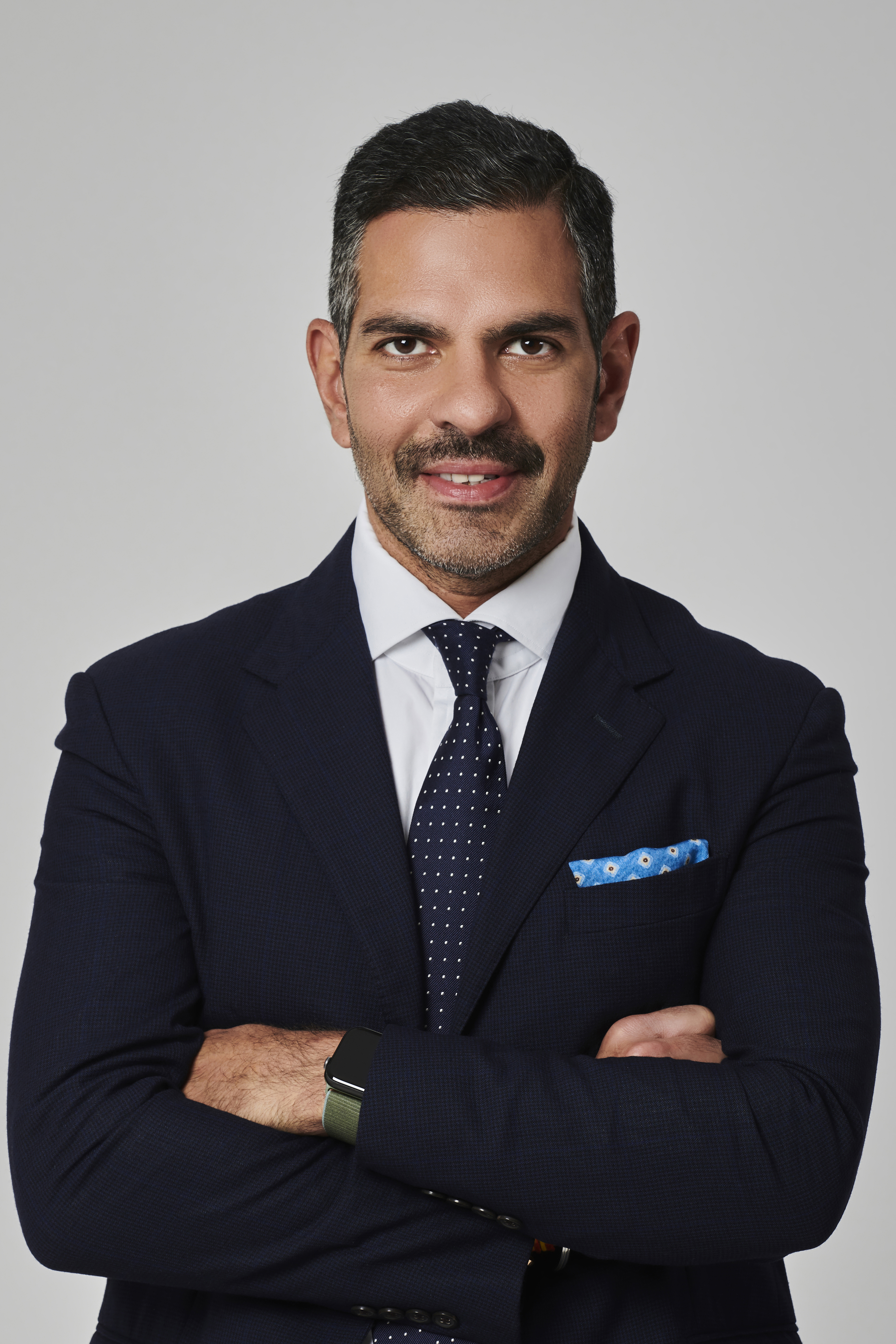
- Sunjay Kapur in 2021
- Died: 12 June 2025 (aged 53)
- Spouse(s): Nandita Mahtani (m. 1996; div. 2000) Karisma Kapoor (m. 2003; div. 2016) Priya Sachdev (m. 2017)
- Children: 3
- Family: Kapoor family (by marriage)

The ₹30,000 crore estate of Indian-American industrialist billionaire Sunjay Kapur has been involved in an inheritance dispute since Kapur's death in June 2025.

== Background ==
Sunjay Kapur was an Indian-American multinational industrialist and billionaire. Kapur died on 12 June 2025 after collapsing during a polo match in England.

Kapur married fashion designer Nandita Mahtani in 1996; they divorced in 2000. In 2003, he married actress Karisma Kapoor. The couple had two children, daughter Samaira (b. 2005), and son Kiaan (b. 2010); the couple separated in 2016. Kapur married a third time to Priya Sachdev in 2017, with whom he had one son, Azarius.

== Dispute ==
After Kapur's death, his third wife, Priya Kapur, produced a March 2025 will. This will said Kapur that left the entire estate to Priya.

This claim was challenged by both his mother Rani Kapur, and separately by his two children with Karisma Kapoor, all of whom alleged it to be a forged will. The two children's legal team have alleged typos in the will and errors such as misspelled names, wrong addresses, and the testator being incorrectly referred to as a "testatrix", a word not used at all.

The matter is being heard before the Delhi High Court, which has permitted forensic and handwriting examination of the original sealed will. Meanwhile, it has ordered maintenance of status quo on the estate, while restraining Priya Kapur from selling, transferring, or dealing with its assets. The High Court has asked Priya Kapur to remove the doubts being raised by the other parties.

The matter also reached the Supreme Court, and in May 2026, the Supreme Court referred the dispute to mediation, with the former Chief Justice DY Chandrachud having been appointed the mediator.

Kapur's mother, Rani Kapur, has also launched a separate civil suit challenging the legality of a 2017 family trust, which has added further complications to the entire matter.
