= Batti =

Batti may refer to:

== Arts ==
- Batti Gul Meter Chalu (transl. Lights off, meter on), a 2018 Indian social problem film directed by Shree Narayan Singh
- Katti Batti, an Indian romantic comedy-drama film directed by Nikkhil Advani
- Laal Batti, a Punjabi novel written by Baldev Singh.
- Teen Batti Char Raasta, a 1953 Hindi comedy-drama film directed by V. Shantaram

== Other uses ==
- Cher batti, a dancing light phenomenon occurring on dark nights, reported in the Banni grasslands
- INS Batti Malv (T67), the 3rd ship of Bangaram-class patrol vessel of the Indian Navy
- Jeannette Batti (1921–2011), a French film actress
