= Rakhee Tandon =

Rakhee Tandon may refer to:

- Rakhee Kapoor Tandon (born 1986), Indian businesswoman
- Rakhi Vijan, formerly Rakhee Tandon, Indian actress active 1996–present
