= Kunal (disambiguation) =

Kunal (or Kunala; born 263 BC) was a crown prince of the Maurya Empire.

Kunal may also refer to:

- Kunal, Haryana, an Indus Valley Civilization site in India

== People with the given name ==
- Kunal Kohli, Indian director
- Kunal Nayyar (born 1981), British-Indian actor
- Kunal Kapoor (disambiguation)
- Kunal Khemu, Indian actor
- Kunal Ganjawala (born 1972), Indian singer
- Kunal Basu (born 1956), Indian novelist
- Kunal Singh (1976–2008), Indian Tamil actor known as Kunal

== People with the surname ==
- Kishore Kunal (1950–2024), officer of the Indian Police Service
