= Baldev Singh (author) =

Indian writer

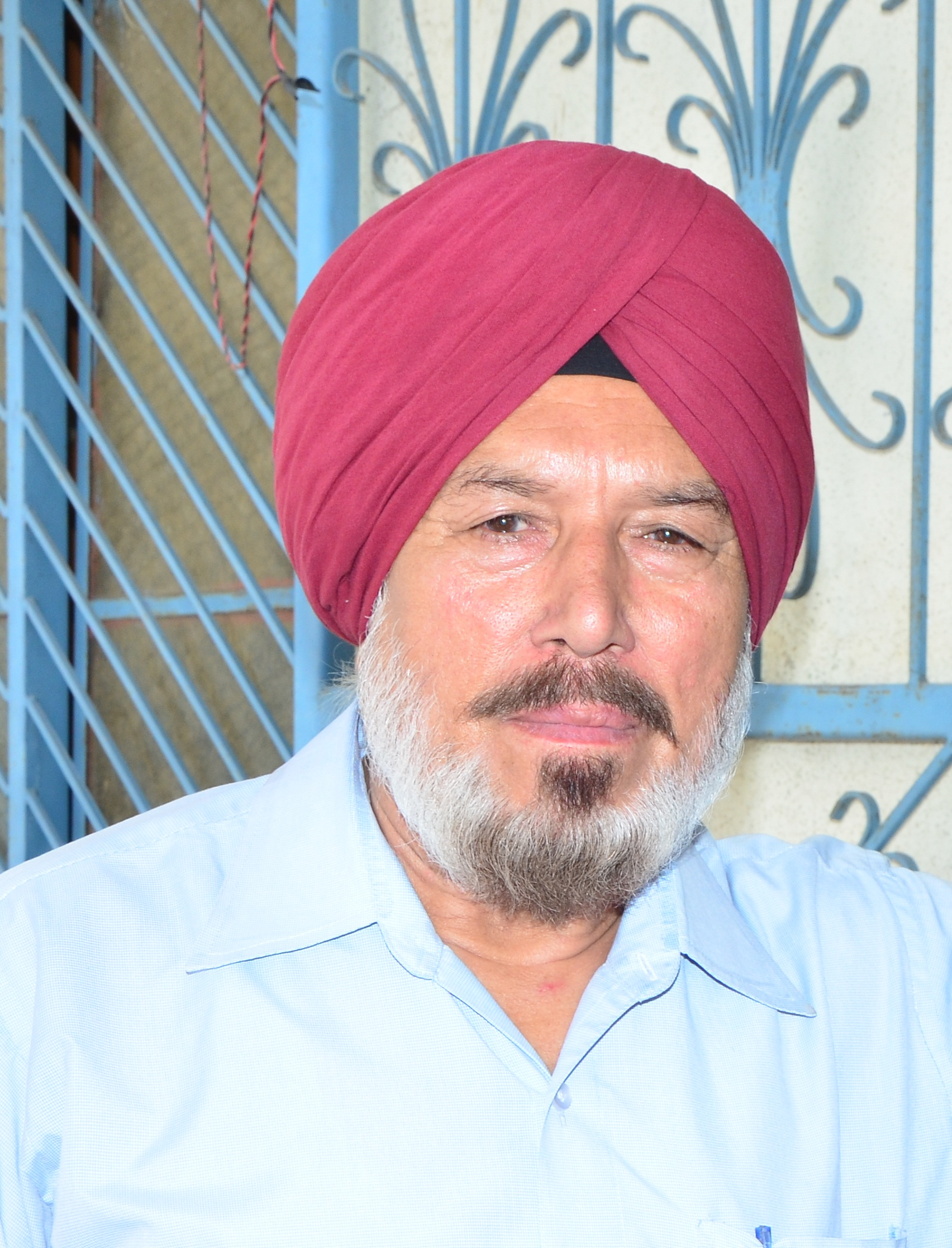
- Born: 11 December 1942 (age 83)
- Education: M.A., B.Ed.
- Occupations: Novelist, story writer
- Writing career
- Notable works: Dhahwan Dilli De Kingre, Sarhaknama, Laal Batti
- Notable awards: Sahitya Akademi Award (2011)

Baldev Singh (11 December 1942), also known as Baldev Singh Sadaknaama, is an Indian novelist and story writer in Punjabi-language. He received the Sahitya Akademi Award 2011 for his novel Dhahwan Dilli De Kingre. As of 2012, he has written 55 novels and various short stories and plays.

== Early life ==
Baldev Singh was born in the village Chand Nawaan in Moga district. He started his career as a teacher in the Muktsar area and spent some time in Himachal Pradesh as a teacher as well. Later he moved to Calcutta and worked as a truck cleaner, taxi driver and truck operator.

== Career ==
Singh is known for his novels Sadaknaama and Laal Batti. His novel Sadaknaama was a road narrative of truck drivers from Punjab. It started as a column in Amrita Pritam's magazine Nagmani and was later published as a three-volume novel. The stories in the novel were based on Singh's real experiences. He himself was a truck driver for 10 years, while working as a teacher. The book became very popular in Punjabi literature and "Sadaknaama" became part of his name for his fans.

His novel Laal Batti dealt with the red-light area of Kolkatta, for which he studied his subject for over a decade. It was also adapted into play by Manch Rang Manch, and directed by Kewal Dhaliwal. His novel Annadaata was about plights of farmers in Punjab and is also part of the Punjabi literature curriculum in the Guru Nanak Dev University and Punjabi University. He plans to write sequels to both these books. His play Mitti Rudan Kare also remains popular.

His work Dhahwan Dilli De Kingre was about the legendary rebel Dulla Bhatti. The novel won him a Sahitya Akademi Award for Punjabi in 2011. He recently published a monogram on Giani Gurdit Singh (1923-2007), a noted Punjabi writer, for Sahitya Akademi, Delhi’s, "Makers of Indian Literature" series.

== Works ==
- Sadaknaama ISBN 9788171425822
- Laal Batti ISBN 9780100005792
- Anndaata ISBN 9788126318742
- Dhahwan Dilli De Kingre ISBN 9788171427116
- Ikkwin Sadi ISBN 9789382837602

== See also ==
- Ram Sarup Ankhi
- Jaswant Singh Kanwal
