= Sudarshan =

Sudarshan may refer to:

== People ==
- Hanumappa Sudarshan, Right Livelihood and Padma Shri award winner, known for his work with the Soliga tribes of Karnataka, India
- George Sudarshan, a prominent Indian American physicist, author, and professor at the University of Texas at Austin
- K. S. Sudarshan, fifth Sarsanghchalak of the Rashtriya Swayamsevak Sangh (RSS), a right-wing Hindutva paramilitary organisation
- R. N. Sudarshan (1939–2017), Indian film actor and producer
- Sudarshan Agarwal, a governor of the state of Uttarakhand, India
- Sudarshan Devanesen, an Indo-Canadian family physician and educator, public health activist, and member of the Order of Canada
- Sudarshan Kapoor, professor, author of Raising up a Prophet (1992)
- Sudarshan Mahasthavir, a Nepalese Buddhist monk and author
- Sudharshan, Indian Telugu comedian a.k.a. Nellore Sudarshan
- Gundu Sudarshan, Indian Telugu comedian
- Sudarshan Yellamaraju, Canadian golfer

== Other uses ==
- Sudarshan laser-guided bomb, a laser-guided bomb built by DRDO, India
- Sudarshana Chakra, a legendary spinning disc like weapon used by the Hindu god Vishnu
- Sudharshan Kriya, a yoga technique
- Sudarshan (magazine), Gujarati language magazine founded by Indian writer Manilal Dwivedi
- Sudharshan, an Indian actor in Telugu cinema
- Sudharshan (film), a 1951 Indian Tamil-language film
- Sudarshan News, an Indian Hindi-language news channel

== See also ==
- Sudarsanam (disambiguation)
