= Sandeep Goyal =

Indian writer

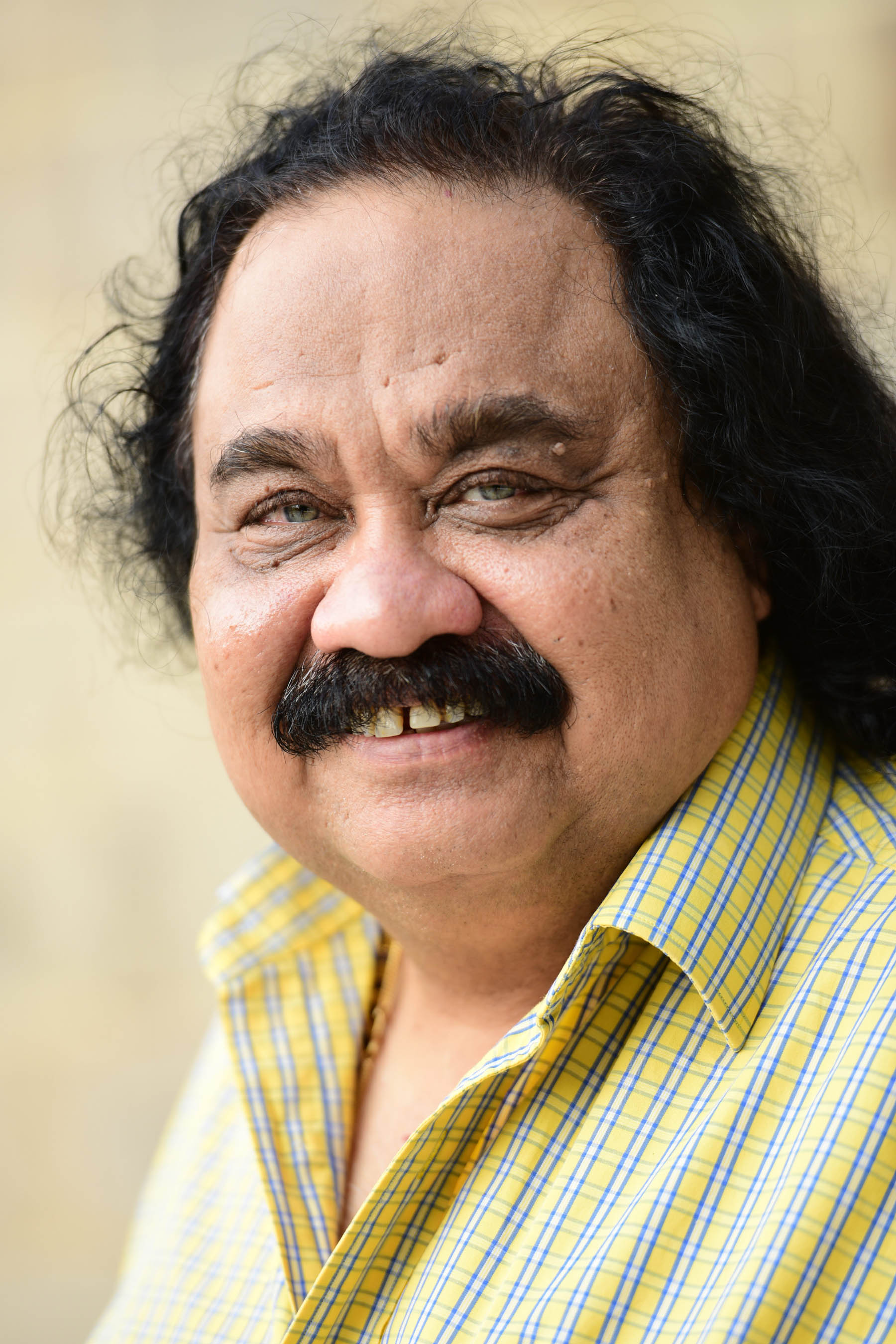
- Born: 5 December 1962 (age 63)
- Education: FMS Delhi
- Occupations: Business, Ad making
- Known for: Mogae Group/Rediffusion
- Spouse: Tanya

Sandeep Goyal (born 5 December 1962 in Amritsar, Punjab, India) is an Indian businessperson, media entrepreneur and author. He is the founder and current chairman of the Mogae Group. He was also the founder-chairman and former JV partner of Dentsu in India and Middle East. At the end of April 2021, he purchased a 100% stake in Rediffusion and Everest, two of India’s largest independent agencies, and took charge as Managing Director. He has been in the advertising, media and digital industry for over 37 years.

== Early life ==
Sandeep Goyal was born in Amritsar, Punjab on 5 December 1962. His schooling was completed at St. John’s High School, Chandigarh (1977). He completed a BA (English Literature with Honors) at D.A.V. College, Chandigarh. He topped at Panjab University (1982) and was awarded a gold medal. He completed an MBA at FMS Delhi (1984); followed by a PhD at FMS Delhi (2018).

== Family ==
Goyal's parents were both senior officers in the government. His father, Dr. S L Goyal, from the first batch of BITS Pilani, was a M. Tech from Punjab Engineering College and completed a PhD (Electrical Engineering). He retired as Chief Engineer from the Punjab State Electricity Board.

Goyal's mother, Kailash Goyal, retired from the IAS, having been Director Food & Civil Supplies, Director Local Government, Labour Commissioner Punjab and had many other posts in her 35 years in civil service.

Goyal and his wife Tanya Goyal set up the Kailasham Arts Trust in 2015 for promotion of the Indian arts.

Goyal's daughter Carol, is a lawyer.

== Career ==
Goyal began his career with a paint company, Goodlass Nerolac Paints, as a sales manager in 1984. After, his journey was in advertising with HTA (now Wunderman Thompson, J. Walter Thompson) as an account executive in 1986. After stints at Trikaya (now Grey) and Interact Vision (part of DDB Mudra), he went on to become President of Rediffusion DY&R between 1997 and 2001. Post that, he was Group CEO of the Zee Group between 2001-2002. In 2003, Goyal signed a JV with Dentsu. Dentsu Inc. of Japan and the Indian joint-venture with Mogae crossed Rs1200 crores in capitalized billings in 2010-11. Goyal sold his 26% stake in the India JV in Jan 2011. He continued as Chairman Emeritus for another 18 months, finally demitting charge in September 2012.

In 2008, Goyal partnered with the Times of India Group, in a 50:50 JV, to create The Indian Fantasy League. This company is now fully owned by the Mogae Group. In 2009, Goyal launched an website named Last Minute Inventory, the world’s first online media trading exchange, in partnership with Dentsu, Star TV, Zee Group & TOI Group. In 2010, the exchange transacted Rs. 67 crores of business, and was profitable.

Mogae Consultants is an investment vehicle for Goyal and his wife, Tanya Goyal. Some of their investments include Turmeric Vision, which operates Food Food channel in partnership with chef Sanjeev Kapoor, a customer relationship management company (ClozR Communications), a digital agency (Clickstreamers) and a media market place Last Minute Inventory. Other investments include creative boutique startup The Mob and PR firms Torque and Midori.

=== Life after Dentsu ===
In 2012, Goyal launched Mogae Media, a mobile monetization company that won exclusive rights to handle the entire m-advertising, m-couponing, and m-commerce for Airtel. Mogae Media received Rs 100 crores of PE funding in 2013 from Renuka Ramnath’s Multiples PE Fund.

In 2015, Goyal launched Tango Media, a subsidiary of Mogae Media to sell StarStar, a new product that he developed in-house. 12 brands tied-up with the company for this service to ensure that customers can directly reach the brand from their mobile. A user would only need to dial Bank on their keypad to reach Yes Bank or Paint for more information from Kansai Nerolac Paints. The service was rolled out on 1 April 2016 and requires no smartphone, data or app download. In 2015 Mogae Media inked a JV with Zeotap GmbH of Berlin, Germany for programmatic advertising.

In October 2015, Mogae Media got into an exclusive marketing tie-up with Israeli start-up Idomoo. In November 2016, Mogae Media acquired personalised video platform Ao1 from Ashish Dabral in a share-swap deal.

In December 2016 Mogae Media acquired Ngage, the ad-tech platform of Nimbuzz BV, a Netherlands-based over-the-top (OTT) content firm in an all-stock deal valued at Rs 40 crore (around $6 million)

In 2017, Mogae Media picked up 10% stake in Sync Media, a company with a new-age digital buying platform.

Since 2019, Goyal has set up a think tank, the Indian Institute of Human Brands, that tracks celebrities and analyses their relevance to brands.

In 2019, Goyal also set up another think-tank, the Forum for Ethical Use of Data (FEUD).

Goyal is Snap's local adviser in India.

Goyal's Mogae launched a JV with VERSA of Australia in November, 2020 for Conversational AI and Voice skills.

Goyal is the Co-Chair of Assocham's Marketing & Branding Council for 2021–22.

In September 2020, the Government of Punjab appointed Goyal as the CEO of the Punjab CSR Authority.

== Rediffusion acquisition ==
In end April 2021, Goyal’s Mogae Consultants completed a full acquisition of Rediffusion and Everest. Rediffusion is a 48 year-old independent ad agency known for its iconic campaigns for Jenson & Nicholson, Eveready, Lakme, Red & White and many more. Everest is more than 70 years old and has been the agency of Parle for over 50 years, and continues to work with the client. Goyal took over as Managing Director while his wife Tanya joined the Board.

== Books ==
Goyal wrote The Dum Dum Bullet on the business of advertising. The book was published by Penguin Group in 2004. In 2013, Goyal co-authored his second book, You’re Hired! with his daughter Carol. In 2014 he published the book Konjo: The Fighting Spirit published by Harper Collins. Konjo is a book centered on entrepreneurship, describing in detail Goyal’s professional years from 2003 to 2011. The book chronicles Goyal's joint venture with Dentsu and what working with the Japanese is like. In 2019, Goyal published three books: Blogbuster (Crossword), a compilation of his blogs in Campaign; Honest to God (Crossword), a compilation of his columns in Business India; and Japan Made Easy (Harper Collins), a book with 101 essays on Japanese business, culture and everyday life.

In 2020, Goyal launched his seventh book, Future Shock, which looks at the post-pandemic impact on domains ranging from travel and tourism to food, health, education and more.

== Awards and recognition ==
Goyal was actively involved with the National Academy of Television Arts and Sciences (NATAS), New York and MIP TV (U.S.) in 2001- 2002. He was the first Indian on the jury of the Global Emmy Awards (2002).

== Philanthropy ==
In 2018, Goyal instituted an Endowment of Rs. 1 crore at his school, St. John’s Chandigarh. He already funds the Ranvijay Singh Awards at the school.

Goyal’s Kailasham Trust currently sponsors the Matka Chowk in Chandigarh and is putting up a huge public installation at the Chowk.

== Columnist ==
He wrote a fortnightly column, "Perfect 10" for The Hindu Business Line and another fortnightly column called "Horse Sense" for The Financial Express in the mid to late 1990s. Since 2015, he has written a column titled "Honest to God" for Business India. Goyal has been writing a column, "Yes, But …" in Business Standard since 2019. He has been writing "Here’s The Pitch", an advertising review column in The New Indian Express since 2019. In 2020, he is writing a series, "Future Shock", for Economic Times’ Brand Equity. He is also, starting in 2020, writing "Fifty-Fifty", a column in BW Business World. His blogs continue to be carried in Campaign. In 2018, he used to write a weekly blog for Exchange4Media, Ask the Doctor, on career planning and job issues. Goyal also writes for The Print. Of late, Goyal has also started writing on cricket. His column, "And It’s A Wide" appears regularly in the Free Press Journal.
