= Giani Gurdit Singh =

- Giani Gurdit Singh

Background information
- Born: 24 February 1923
- Origin: Mithewal, Punjab Province, British India
- Died: 17 January 2007 (aged 83)

Giani Gurdit Singh (24 February 1923 – 17 January 2007) was born in Mithewal village (Sangrur district) in the state of Punjab, India. He was considered one of the greatest contemporary writers in Punjabi, and his book Mera Pind is regarded as a classic. It is now in its 23rd edition and has been in print continuously since 1961. He was also a pioneering journalist, the Owner-Editor of Parkash (a Punjabi language newspaper) from 1947–1978. He was also the editor of Singh Sabha Patrika, a monthly magazine of Sikh history and divinity (from 1973–2002). Giani Gurdit Singh graduated as "Giani" from Punjab University, Lahore in 1945, and he specialised in literature, divinity, history and folklore. He was a member of the Punjab Legislative Council from 1956 to 1962. He contributed to the debates at that time and in the creation of Punjabi University, Patiala and the recognition of Takht Sri Damdama Sahib, Talwandi Sabo, as the 5th Takht of the Sikhs. He was General Secretary of the Singh Sabha Shatabadi Committee, Amritsar, renamed Kendriya Sri Guru Singh Sabha. As the editor of the magazine Singh Sabha Patrika, he focused on issues of importance to the Sikhs. He also established two Guru Granth Vidya Kendras, one in Chandigarh and another in Mehrauli, Delhi.

== Family ==
Giani Gurdit Singh was a Sikh and was married to Inderjit Kaur Sandhu (1923-2022), who was the third vice-chancellor of Punjabi University, Patiala, and chairperson, Staff Selection Commission, Government of India. He had two sons, Roopinder Singh (former senior associate editor, The Tribune, Chandigarh), and Ravinder Singh. Giani Gurdit Singh is a legend in the Punjabi-speaking world. Sahitya Akademi, India's premier literary body, has a "Makers of Indian Literature" series of monograms. In 2019, it published the book "Giani Gurdit Singh" in Punjabi by Baldev Singh (author), the famous novelist and Sahitya Akademi award winner, on Giani Gurdit Singh's life and literary works. Punjabi University, Patiala, published "Gian Gurdit Singh Jiwan te Rachna" by Dr Jit Singh Joshi in 2023.

== Literary and research work ==
Mera Pind draws a word picture of cultural life in Punjab, more specifically, of the Malwa region. With 29 chapters and 12 comments by critics, the 480-page book takes its readers through life, customs, folk songs, and seasons, using a series of relatable characters that find resonance with people who have a connection with village life. It remains the author's most famous creation and is often prescribed as a textbook for advanced Punjabi students. The following is a chronological listing of his published works:

- Edited 50 books, with introductory essays, for the Shiromani Gurdwara Prabhandak Committee (SGPC) in connection with the tercentenary celebrations of the Khalsa.
- 2003 Itihaas Sri Guru Granth Sahib: Mundavani (History of Guru Granth Sahib: Mundavani)
- 2000 Itihaas Sri Guru Granth Sahib: Bhagat Bani (History of Guru Granth Sahib: Bhagat Bani, second edition)
- 1995 Mera Pind (My Village), a substantially modified and enlarged edition with five new chapters
- 1990 Ithas Sri Guru Granth Sahib, Bhagat Bani Bhag (History of Sri Guru Granth Sahib)
- 1987 Punjabi Jiwan te Sabhyachar (Punjabi Life and Culture)
- 1971 Punjab Dian Lok Kahanian (Folk Tales of Punjab, in three volumes, running into 834 pages)
- 1967 Mera Pind da Jiwan (Life of my Village)
- 1965 Takht Sri Damdama Sahib (a research report)
- 1961 Bhat te Unhan di Rachna (Bhats and their creation)
- 1961 Mera Pind (My Village)
- 1960 Tith Tihar (Functions & Festivals)
- 1960 Reetan te Rewaj
- 1960 Mere Pind di Rup Rekha (Facets of my Village)
- 1960 Viah Dian Rasma (Customs of Marriage)
- 1955 Achchoh Sikhran (Unattainable Paradigms, a collection of poems)
- 1954 Bhavan de Desh (Emotional Missives, a collection of poems)
- 1950 Amarnama (edited)
- 1945 Raag Mala di Asliat (The reality of Raag Mala)
- 19-- Nawan Punjab
- Anandpur Sahib di Sahit nu Dein (The Contribution of Anandpur Sahib to Literature)

== Honours ==
- Punjabi Sahit Shiromani Puraskar, Languages Department, Punjab, 2006.
- Godrej No. 1 Doordarshan Panj Pani Sanman 2005 for contribution to the Punjabi heritage and culture by Doordarshan Kendra, Jalandhar.
- Honoured by Chief Khalsa Diwan, Amritsar at the Centenary Celebrations. 2003
- S. Kartar Singh Dhaliwal Award by Punjabi Sahitya Akademi, Ludhiana, 2000
- Designated Gurmat Acharya by Shiromani Gurdwara Prabhandak Committee, Amritsar in 1991
- UNESCO prize for Punjabi Literature for the book Mera Pind da Jiwan in 1967
- UNESCO prize for Punjabi Literature for the book Tith Tihar in 1960

== News ==
- 25 February 2008 – Book on Giani Gurdit Singh released
- 17 January 2007 – Giani Gurdit Singh passes away
- 20 October 2006 – Giani Gurdit Singh Ji awarded Punjabi Sahit Shiromani Puraskar
- 3 June 2005 – Mera Pind-fame Gurdit Singh expresses concern at westernisation of youngsters
- 14 March 2005 – 'Save language to save Punjabi culture'
- 15 August 2004– Mera Pind: A humorous trip down memory lane
