= St. John's High School, Chandigarh =

Educational institute in Chandigarh, India

Coordinates: 30.7332°N 76.8122°E

St. John's High School
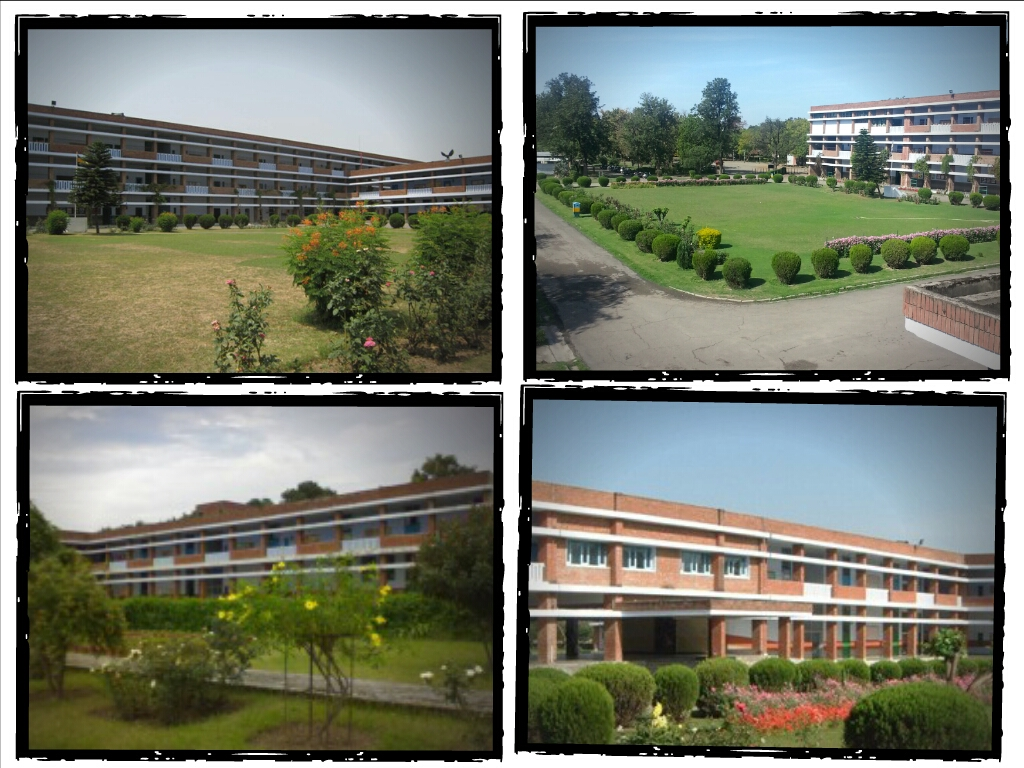
- St. John's High School
- Chandigarh, India

Information
- Type: Private school All boys school Day boarding Senior secondary school Catholic minority educational institution English medium
- Motto: Pro Deo et Patria (For God and Country)
- Established: 1959; 67 years ago
- Founder: Congregation of Christian Brothers
- Principal: Mrs. Rajashree Vipin
- Grades: KG-12
- Gender: Boys
- Enrollment: ~2000
- Colors: Blue; Yellow; Green
- Mascot: Eagle
- Affiliation: CBSE
- Website: stjohnschandigarh.com

St. John's High School is an Edmund Rice Educational Institute, founded by the Congregation of Christian Brothers in 1959. The school building was designed by prominent French architect Pierre Jeanneret. It is located in Sector 26, Chandigarh.

== St. John's Old Boys Association ==
SJOBA bumper sticker

St. John's Old Boys Association (SJOBA) is an alumni association formed by the students who attended the school. It has around 3700 members. It is managed by an executive body chosen from within the community each year. SJOBA completed 30 years in 2009.

It organizes events such as blood donation camps. The year-end vocational counselling for students passing out is an annual tradition. It conducts the annual debate for students of the Senior Wing, an Annual Quiz, and sports events such as football and cricket matches between the school teams and a team of old boys.

SJOBA organises recreational events including the SJOBA Thunderbolt Rally around March, the SJOBA Mini-marathon around November and the SJOBA Winter Fest in December, which includes the SJOBA Treasure Hunt, Cultural Evening (plays and musical nights) and the Winterball, which is the annual reunion organised by the alumni.

SJOBA mentors economically challenged students and contributes to the school in the form of sports facilities and financial aid. A wing of SJOBA called the SJOBA Foundation offers scholarships to students who show promise in the fields of academics and sports.

== Notable alumni ==
- Sandeep Goyal, Indian businessperson, media entrepreneur and author
- Shitij Kapur, President of King's College London
- Ayushmann Khurrana, Indian actor, comedian and singer; winner of MTV Roadies season 2
- Rochak Kohli, Indian Instrumentalist and Music Director
- Krishna Pandit, Indian professional footballer
- Sumrit Shahi, best-selling Author of Just Friends, Never Kiss Your Best Friend
- Kapil Sibal, former lawyer; politician belonging to Indian National Congress Party
- Jeev Milkha Singh, golfer
- Roopinder Singh, writer, journalist, The Tribune Chandigarh
- Nalin Surie, diplomat
- Manish Tewari, politician; former Minister of Information and Broadcasting and a Member of Parliament
- Jaideep Varma, writer, filmmaker
- Navtej Johar, Dancer

== See also ==
- List of Christian Brothers schools in India
