= Rakhee Kapoor Tandon =

- Born: Rakhee Kapoor; 3 July 1986 (age 40)
- Education: Wharton Business School, University of Pennsylvania
- Occupations: Entrepreneur, investment banker
- Employer: Yes Bank
- Parent(s): Rana Kapoor and Bindu Kapoor

Rakhee Kapoor Tandon, is an Indian business entrepreneur and venture capitalist. She is the daughter of Rana Kapoor, managing director of Yes Bank. She has worked as an investment banker in the United States and also holds an MBA degree from the Wharton School of the University of Pennsylvania. She is one of "India’s 25 Most Influential Women", according to India Today.

She is the Founder, Managing Director & CEO of RAAS Capital (India) Pvt. Ltd, a financial services holding company. Under RAAS Capital, she has founded two ventures—RAAS Housing Finance (India) Pvt. Ltd, a company that is engaged in providing long-term mortgage finance to retail customers, and Rural Agri Ventures India Pvt. Ltd, an incubation/project development firm focussed on verticals in the rural and agricultural domain.

== Personal life ==
She is the daughter of Rana Kapoor and has an elder sister Radha and a younger sister Roshini.

In 2012, she married Delhi/Dubai-based businessman Alkesh Tandon.
