= Madhusree Dutta =

Indian filmmaker, author and curator

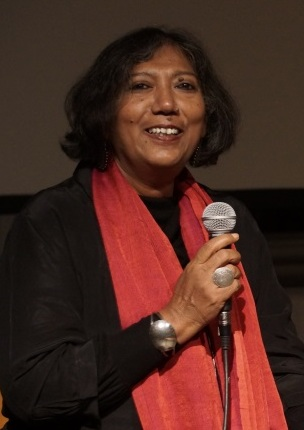
- Born: 1959 (age 66–67); Jamshedpur, India
- Education: Jadavpur University; National School of Drama
- Occupations: Filmmaker, author, curator

Madhusree Dutta is an Indian filmmaker, author and curator.

== Life and education ==
Madhusree Dutta was born in the industrial town of Jamshedpur, Jharkhand (then Bihar). Her parents are Sukhamaya Dutta, an athlete and Kalpana Dutta, a homemaker. She has studied Economics at Jadavpur University, Kolkata, and Dramatics at National School of Drama, New Delhi. In 1987, Dutta shifted her base to Mumbai (called Bombay in 1987).

Dutta was jury in Berlinale (Berlin International Film Festival); Feminale: International Women's Film Festival, Cologne in 2006; Message to Man International Documentary Film Festival, St. Petersburg in 2001; and was chairperson of the jury in International Documentary and Short Film Festival of Kerala in 2009; and SIGNS Festival of Digital Videos in 2014. Her retrospectives were held in MIFF (Mumbai International Documentary Festival), 2018; Persistence Resistance Film Festival, Delhi in 2008; Madurai Film Festival in 2007; NGBK Gallery; Berlin in 2001. Her retrospectives were held in IDSFFK in Kerala in 2019, MIFF (Mumbai International Documentary Festival), 2018; [2][3] Persistence Resistance Film Festival, Delhi in 2008; Madurai Film Festival in 2007; NGBK Gallery, Berlin in 2001.

She currently lives between Mumbai and Berlin.

== Work ==
Madhusree Dutta brought art practices, activism, and pedagogy together in one platform as early as 1990 when she curated EXPRESSION, the first feminist arts festival. The festival witnessed the coming together of feminist scholars, women artists and women's movement activists, and is regarded as a landmark in the history of feminism in India. Her works generally contemplate gender construction, urban development, public arts and documentary practices. Most of her works are situated within a hybrid form, engaging multiple genres and a provocative mixing of high art and low art. Her works often display a flamboyant mix of pedagogical, political and experimental, indicating towards her multiple identities as a political activist and avant-garde artist. Some of her collaborators are theatre director Anuradha Kapur and playwright Malini Bhattacharya; visual artists Nilima Sheikh, Archana Hande, and Shilpa Gupta; B V Suresh, Kausik Mukhopadhyay, and Tushar Joag; architect Rohan Shivkumar in India. In Germany, she has collaborated with media scholars Nanna Heidenreich and Mi You; filmmaker Philip Scheffner; novelist Merle Kröger; researcher Aurora Rodono; and visual artist Ala Younis.

The same pursuit has also led to several digital archiving projects and pedagogical initiatives. One such project Godaam is available online in the free access site PADMA (Public Access Digital Media Archive).

Madhusree was co-founder of Majlis, an institution that works on cultural activism and women's rights in Mumbai. She was the executive director of the institution from 1998 to 2016. She was the Artistic Director of Akademie der Künste der Welt (Academy of the Arts of the World) in Cologne, Germany, 2018–2021. She has been an active member of the women's movement in India and the World Social Forum (WSF) process, and has made a major contribution by producing, mobilising, and disseminating arts and artists for the movements.

=== Theatre ===
Dutta began her career with a Bengali theatre group Anarjya (non-Aryans) in Kolkata. She was also a member of cadre of Sachetana, a feminist group in Kolkata. For Anarjya and Sachetana, she directed plays both for proscenium and street theatre. A Bengali adaptation of Bertolt Brecht's Mother Courage and Her Children, and an anti-dowry musical by Malini Bhattacharya – Meye Dile Sajiye (Giving Away the Girl) are considered two of the most memorable directorial works of her during that period. In Mumbai, too, she was active in theatre for a few years before getting fully involved with visual arts. She directed a popular street play for the women's movement – Nari Itihas ki Talash mein (In search of Women's History) in 1988 and an adaptation of Aristophanes’ Lysistrata – Aaj Pyar Bandh (Love is on Strike) in 1991. She has even dabbled with a television serial in her salad days and directed a 13-episode Gujarati serial for her friend, producer-actor Meenal Patel (1989–1990).

=== Films ===
The first film made by her is I Live in Behrampada (1993). The documentary made on a Muslim ghetto in the context of communal riots in Mumbai 1992-93 received Filmfare Award for best documentary in 1994. The film turned out to be a serious discursive material for conflict study, and the script of it was published in an anthology - Politics of Violence: From Ayodhya to Behrampada, eds. John McGuire, Peter Reeves and Howard Brasted, Sage Publication, 1996. Subsequently, she has made several films – documentary, shorts, video spots and non-fiction features. Most of her films are made with the same unit comprising cameraman Avijit Mukul Kishore and editor Shyamal Karmakar. Her 2006 film Seven Islands and A Metro, on the city of Bombay / Mumbai was one of the first documentary films to have been commercially released in the theatres in India. Her 2026 film Flying Tigers premiered at the 76th Berlin International Film Festival. The film, named for the aircraft that transferred military supplies during WWII across the Himalayas, combines documentary style with archival materials, musical numbers, and performance to tell the story of the border populations that exist between India and China. Apart from making her own films, she has also produced several documentaries for younger filmmakers. Her role as a pedagogue, mentor, and producer has helped to consolidate a peer group around documentary practices in Mumbai. Her films had received three National Film Awards. She relinquished them in 2015 as part of a nationwide campaign against political interference in academic institutions.

=== Curatorial practices ===
Madhusree’s curatorial projects combine radical art practices with pedagogy, political campaigns, and public cultures. Her works of Public Art curation include Expression, the first women's arts festival in India in 1990, and culture@WSF, a large-scale public art project within the World Social Forum in Mumbai in 2004, Porto Alegre in 2005 and Nairobi in 2007. For Akademie Der Künste Der Welt she curated Memory Stations in 2019 – a public history project engaging nine towns in the state of North Rhine-Westphalia in Germany. In 2020, Ghosts, Traces, Echoes: Works in Shifts was co-curated with Eva Busch – an exhibition project on cultures around work in Ruhrgebiet, the former industrial zone of Germany.

Project Cinema City: Research Art and Documentary Practices,

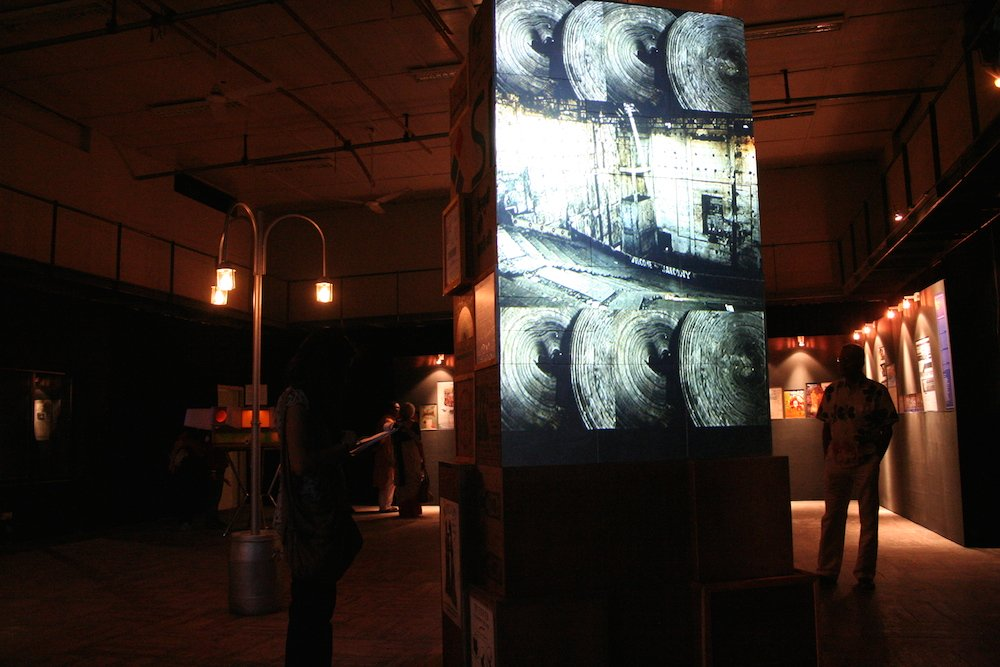
Project Cinema City

Project Cinema City: Research Art and Documentary Practices, a research project with multi-disciplinary interfaces of arts, is curated by her in 2009-2013. The project enquires into various layers of the relationship between the city of Mumbai and the cinema that it manufactures. The project primarily argues for cinema to be regarded as a labour-intensive phenomenon that is connected to labour migration, post-industrial norm of sweatshop production, shifts in urban demography and urban development, access to technology and market etc. The project outputs contain documentary films production, public art installations, pedagogical courses, publications, and archives. The project was first exhibited at Berlinale (Berlin International Film Festival) -Forum Expanded as part of the 60th anniversary of the festival in 2010. Subsequently, it was exhibited in the galleries of National Gallery of Modern Art in Mumbai, Delhi, and Bangalore as well as in several smaller galleries and public places in 2011-14

== Publications ==
- How to Make Female Action Heroes, Kayfa ta, 2023,
- Fake hybrid sites palimpsest: Essays on Leakages, co-edited with Nanna Heidenreich, De Gruyter, 2021
- Project Cinema City, co-edited with Kaushik Bhaumik and Rohan Shivkumar, Tulika Books, 2013 / Columbia University Press
- Arjun Appadurai, social-cultural anthropologist, wrote in the foreword of the book: "The work of the Cinema City group may be seen as a Situationist move, no longer in the context of Paris in the 1950s and 1960s, but of Bombay in the 1990s and in the decade of the twenty-first century. Like the Situationists, the Cinema City group is not concerned with art as a comment on the city but as a product of the city, a lens into urban life and re-situating its already existing visual elements." Project Cinema City, an anthology of essays, graphics, annotated films and artworks, was adjudged the Best Printed Book of the Year in Publishing Next Industry Award, 2014.
- dates.sites: Bombay / Mumbai (co-designed with Shilpa Gupta), Tulika Books, Columbia University Press, 2012, a graphic timeline of the public cultures in the 20th century.
- The Nation, the State and Indian Identity, co-edited with Flavia Agnes and Neera Adarkar, Samya of Bhatkal and Sen, in 1996. It is an anthology of essays in the context of the demolition of Babri Masjid in December 1992.
- KEYWORDING: Notes on Enculturation of Words and Word Practice within the Image Archive, with Berlin-based artist Ines Schaber. It is a book-making endeavour, conceived as part of Living Archive Project to commemorate the 50th anniversary of Arsenal Institute for Film and Video Art – Berlin
- In her pursuit for newer and subversive forms, Dutta has also produced a popular CDrom game Spice Adventures, in collaboration with artist Shilpa Gupta. The interactive narrative, with games and animation, unveils the secret of Indian cuisine – spices that have migrated to India from all over the world.

== Awards ==
- Filmfare Award for best documentary for I Live in Behrampada, 1994
- 1996, 2001 National Film Award, India
- Second Best Film Award, International Video Fest, 1995;
- Best Public Service Advertisement Award, 1998;
- Best Script award in Shanghai International Film Festival, 2001;
- IDPA Awards for best Kannada film and best Bengali film, 2001;
- HIVOS Culture Award for Asia region, 2005
- Special Jury Award in Film Southasia, 2007;
- John Abrahan Best Documentary award (as producer), 2012;
- Kölner Kulturpreis "Cultural Manager of the year 2018", Kölner Kulturpreis, 2019 www.koelnerkulturrat.de
- "Lifetime Achievement Award", International Documentary and Short Film Festival of Kerala (IDSFFK)Award for filmmaker Madhusree Dutta
- Several citizens’ award in India and a peer-nominated art prize for artistic

achievements by Atelier Automatique in Bohum, Germany (2022).
