= Anuradha Kapur =

Indian theatre director and professor of drama

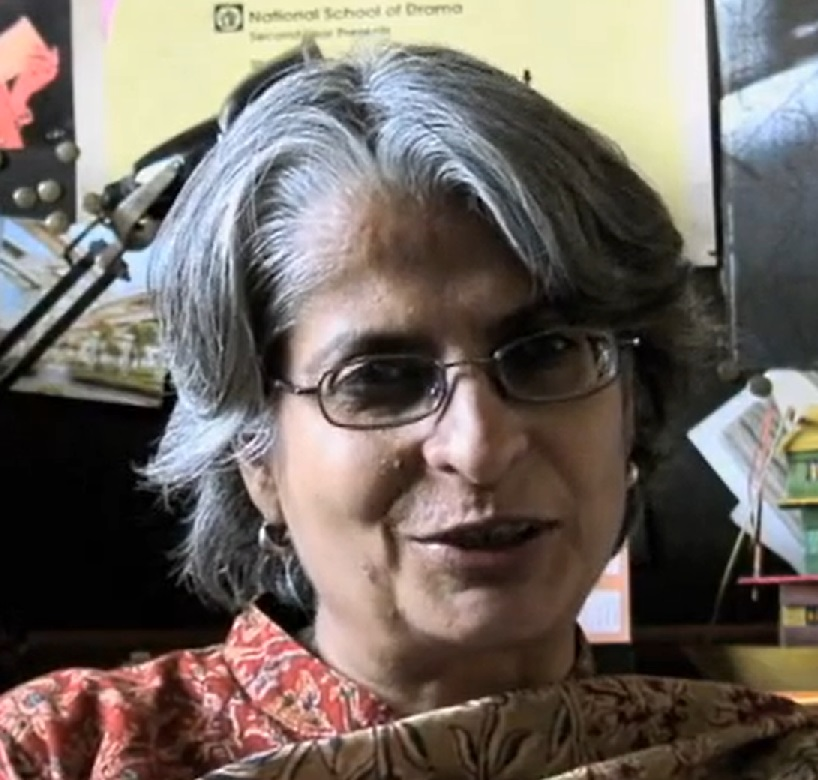
- Kapur in 2012
- Born: 1951 (age 74–75); Nainital, India
- Education: Miranda House, DU; University of Leeds
- Occupation: Theatre director
- Years active: 1973 - present
- Known for: Director of NSD
- Parents: M. N. Kapur (father); Amrita Kapur (mother)
- Family: Geeta Kapur (sister)
- Awards: Sangeet Natak Akademi Award (2004); J. Vasanthan Lifetime Achievement Award (2016)

Anuradha Kapur is an Indian theatre director and professor of drama. She taught at the National School of Drama (NSD) for over three decades and was the Director of National School of Drama for six years (2007–2013). For her work as a theatre director, the Sangeet Natak Akademi Award was conferred on her in 2004. In 2016, she was awarded the J. Vasanthan Lifetime Achievement Award for excellence in theatre. Her work as a director is noted for its open and interactive nature.

== Early life ==
Anuradha Kapur was born in Nainital in 1951. She is the daughter of M. N. Kapur, the longest-serving Principal of Modern School, New Delhi, and Amrita Kapur, Art historian and critic Geeta Kapur is her sister. After completing her schooling from Modern School, New Delhi, she studied English at Miranda House, Delhi. She obtained her master's degree in English from the University of Delhi in 1973.

== Career ==
Kapur started her teaching career as lecturer in English in Delhi University's Bharati College. However, she was always sure that she wanted to pursue theatre as a profession. During her student days, she had been a member of the theatre group Dishantar led by Om Shivpuri, and acted in a number of plays, including Adhe-Adhure by Mohan Rakesh. She obtained leave from the college to study for a master's degree in drama and theatre arts at the University of Leeds, UK, where she eventually completed a Ph.D.

In 1981, Kapur joined the faculty of NSD as associate professor. She later became professor, and stayed with NSD until her superannuation. During this period, she taught many students who went on to make a mark in theatre and cinema. Some of them are Seema Biswas, Irrfan Khan, Rajpal Yadav, Nawazuddin Siddiqui and Adil Hussain.

In July 2007, Kapur was appointed director of NSD for a five-year term, later extended by a year up to July 2013. She was also Chief of the NSD Repertory Company. Currently she is visiting professor at the School of Culture and Creative Expressions, Ambedkar University Delhi.

Kapur has taught in several institutions in India and abroad. During 2016–2017, she was Fellow at Freie Universitat, Berlin.

Kapur is a Trustee of the Sher-Gil Sundaram Arts Foundation.

== Work ==
A distinguishing feature of Kapur's work as a director has been its open and interactive nature. She has worked extensively in collaboration with visual and video artists and filmmakers. Some of the people she has worked with are Arpita Singh, Bhupen Khakhar, Madhusree Dutta, Nalini Malani, Nilima Sheikh and Vivan Sundaram. She is one of the founding members of Vivadi, a working group of painters, musicians, writers and theatre practitioners. "Porous borders between art forms", according to Kapur, take the work "to a level where meanings emerge in multitudes."

Most recently, Kapur has ventured into a new genre - opera - with an international team assisting her in the production "Daughters", staged in Delhi in January 2020.

Kapur's most recent international collaboration is an India-South Africa co-production of Othello, slated for 2023.

== Books authored/edited by Anuradha Kapur ==
- Actors, Pilgrims, Kings, and Gods: The Ramlila at Ramnagar, by Anuradha Kapur. Seagull Books, 1990. ISBN 9788170460466
- Intercultural Acting and Performer Training, edited by Phillip B. Zarrilli, T. Sasitharan and Anuradha Kapur. Routledge, 2019. ISBN 9781138352131

== Awards and honours ==
- Sangeet Natak Akademi Award (2004)
- J. Vasanthan Lifetime Achievement Award (2016)
