= Inderjit Kaur Sandhu =

Indian educationist (1923–2022)

- Born: 1 September 1923
- Died: 27 January 2022
- Occupations: Academic and Administrator
- Spouse: Giani Gurdit Singh

Academic background
- Education: Victoria Girls School, Patiala; RB Sohan Lal Training College, Lahore; Government College, Lahore; Mahindra College, Patiala

Inderjit Kaur Sandhu (1 September 1923 – 27 January 2022), widely known as Inderjit Kaur, was an Indian educationist and administrator. She was the third Vice-Chancellor of Punjabi University, Patiala (1975 to 1977), and Chairperson of the Staff Selection Commission, New Delhi (1980 to 1985). Sandhu was the first woman to head both these organisations. After retirement, she lived in Chandigarh, India.

== Early life and education ==
Born in Patiala, she was the daughter of Colonel Sher Singh Sandhu and Kartar Kaur; she received her primary education at Victoria Girls School, Patiala. She then went to Lahore, where she did a Bachelor of Teaching course at RB Sohan Lal Training College. After that, she earned an MA in Philosophy from Government College, Lahore. She was also in the first batch of students who completed the first batch of the master's course in the Punjabi language at Mahindra College, Patiala.

== Career and activities ==
She started her teaching career in 1946 and was soon involved in providing help to persons displaced by the Partition of India who came to Patiala in large numbers, as also those families that needed to go across the border. Inderjit Kaur taught at Government College for Women, Patiala. She was a Professor of Education at the State College of Education, Patiala. At 27, Sandhu was a member of the Governing Council of Khalsa College, Amritsar (1950-1953). She taught at Basic Training College, Chandigarh, from 1958 to 1967 and became Vice-Principal there. She also served as Principal of the Government College for Women in Patiala and then in Amritsar.

In 1975 she became the Vice-Chancellor of Punjabi University, Patiala, for a three-year term. During this period, she was a member of the Commonwealth of Universities. She lectured and attended various international conferences in the USA, New Zealand, Australia and the UK.

Inderjit Kaur became Chairperson of Staff Selection Commission, New Delhi, in 1980 for a five-year term. Here she introduced many reforms. During her tenure, the commission moved to its present location in the CGO complex in Delhi.

== Family ==
Inderjit Kaur was married to Giani Gurdit Singh (1923–2007), a celebrated writer in Punjabi, a former Member of the Punjabi Legislative Council and a religious scholar. They have two children, Roopinder Singh (b. 1960), an author and former Senior Associate Editor of The Tribune, Chandigarh, and Ravinder Singh (b. 1961), a businessman.

== Documentary and festschrift ==
The professional and personal journey of Inderjit Kaur was well extensively by the media, both in Indian and abroad. A Punjabi documentary on her was made by Doordarshan Jalandhar in its Dhian Punjab Dian (Daughters of Punjab) series. The BBC did a feature story on her in many Indian languages. The book "Inderjit Kaur Sandhu: An Inspiring Journey", was released on 1 September 2021. The bilingual festschrift has 30 articles in English and Punjabi.
