= Kunal Kapoor =

Kunal Kapoor may refer to:

- Kunal Kapoor (actor, born 1959), Indian film actor
- Kunal Kapoor (actor, born 1977), Indian actor, writer and entrepreneur
- Kunaal Roy Kapur (born 1979), Indian film actor
- Kunal Karan Kapoor (born 1982), Indian actor
- Kunal Kapoor (cricketer) (born 1987), Indian cricketer
- Kunal Kapur, Indian celebrity chef and restaurateur
