= Roopinder Singh =

Indian journalist and author (born 1960)

- Born: 21 July 1960 (age 66)
- Education: B.A. Hons Philosophy; M.A. Philosophy
- Alma mater: Yadavindra Public School, Patiala; St Stephens College, Delhi; Delhi University
- Occupations: Journalist and author
- Employer(s): India Observer, New York, The Tribune, Chandigarh
- Notable work: Guru Nanak: His Life and Teachings; Sikh Heritage: Ethos and Relics (co-author); The Sikhs (consultant)

Roopinder Singh (born 21 July 1960) is an Indian journalist and author. He retired as Senior Associate Editor with the English daily newspaper, The Tribune, published from Chandigarh, India. in 2020. His specialization is Sikh history and culture, information technology, and education. He is the author of six major books in English, including a critically acclaimed volume on the founder of Sikh religion, Guru Nanak Dev, and a volume on Sikh heritage. He lives in Chandigarh, Punjab.

== Early life ==
Roopinder Singh was born in Shimla, Himachal Pradesh, India. His father, Giani Gurdit Singh (24 February 1923 – 17 January 2007), was a famous Punjabi author, and his mother, Inderjit Kaur Sandhu (1 September 1923 – 27 January 2022), was a well-known academic and administrator. She was Vice Chancellor of Punjabi University, Patiala, India (1975 to 1977) and Chairperson, Staff Selection Commission, Delhi (1980 to 1985).

== Education ==
Roopinder Singh studied in St. John's High School, Chandigarh; St. Francis School, Amritsar; and Yadavindra Public School, Patiala, where he earned his Senior Cambridge 'O' level certificate. At St. Stephen's College, Delhi; he read his BA Philosophy (Honors) and MA Philosophy degrees. He was also secretary of the college's Philosophical Society and the Punjabi Society.

== Professional career ==
Roopinder Singh was an assistant editor, Indian Observer, New York. He joined The Tribune in Chandigarh, India, in 1991. He launched the internet edition in 1998 and headed it till 2015. He was in charge of book reviews from 2002 to July 2020. The other charges he held included Sunday Reading, Saturday Extra, Log in Tribune, Real Estate and Jobs & Careers supplements.

=== Book reviews published in The Tribune ===
In his nearly three decades with The Tribune, he published many book reviews, including:

1. History in the Making: The Visual Archives of Kulwant Roy, By Aditya Arya and Indivar Kamtekar, HarperCollins.
2. Indian Persuasions: 50 years of Seminar: Selected Writings, Ed. Rudrangshu Mukherjee, Roli Books.

== Books ==
Roopinder Singh has published several books with eight major works in English and one in Hindi. His book in Hindi is on the Sikh Guru Nanak Dev. A complete listing of his work is given below:

1. Marshal of the Indian Air Force, Arjan Singh, DFC. Rupa and Co, New Delhi, 2002. ISBN 81-7167-938-2 Review by Dr I J Singh, New York University, New York. The book was the first biography of a MIAF Arjan Singh the legendary pilot who is India's first Air Force Field Marshal.
2. Guru Nanak: His Life and Teachings. Rupa and Co, New Delhi, 2004. ISBN 81-291-0442-3 Review by Prof V N Dutta.
3. Giani Gurdit Singh: 1923-2007. Sahit Parkashan, Chandigarh 2008. (A festschrift, in Punjabi and English, co-edited with Inderjit Kaur).
4. Woman: Many Hues Many Shades. Lahore Publishers. 2009. (co-author).
5. Sikh Heritage: Ethos and Relics. Rupa & Co. 2012. Bhayee Sikandar Singh and Roopinder Singh.(co-authors). ISBN 9788129119834.
6. Delhi '84. Sahit Parkashan, Chandigarh 2014. (Novela)
7. Inderjit Kaur Sandhu: An Inspiring Journey. Sahit Parkashan, Chandigarh 2021 (Festschrift in English and Punjabi edited by Roopinder Singh)
8. Sikhs: The Story of a People, their Faith and Culture (Consultant). DK Books. 2023.
