= Sudarsanam =

Sudarsanam is an Indian name:

- D. Sudarsanam, an Indian politician and Member of the Legislative Assembly of Tamil Nadu
- Maddi Sudarsanam, an Indian parliamentarian

== See also ==
- Sudarshan (disambiguation)
