= Geeta Kapur =

Indian art critic, art historian, and curator

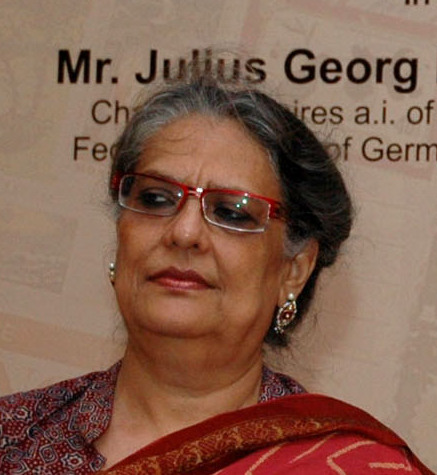
- Kapur in 2008
- Education: M.A. in Arts from New York University, M.A. in Arts from the Royal College of Art, London.
- Known for: Art Writing, Curating, Art Critic, Indian Art Theory
- Movement: Indian Modernism, Indian Post Modernism, Decolonised Avant-garde in India, Indian Art, Contemporary Indian Art
- Spouse: Vivan Sundaram
- Awards: Padma Shri

Geeta Kapur (born 1943) is a noted Indian art critic, art historian and curator based in New Delhi. She was one of the pioneers of critical art writing in India, and who, as Indian Express noted, has "dominated the field of Indian contemporary art theory for three decades now". Her writings include artists' monographs, exhibition catalogues, books, and sets of widely anthologized essays on art, film, and cultural theory.

She has written various books, including Contemporary Indian Artists (1978), When Was Modernism: Essays on Contemporary Cultural Practice in India (2000) and Critic’s Compass: Navigating Practice (forthcoming). She is one of the founder-editors of Journal of Arts & Ideas (Delhi), along with academic G. P. Deshpande. She has also been on the advisory boards of Third Text (London), Marg (Mumbai), and ARTMargins. She was a jury member of the Biennales of Venice (2005), Dakar (2006), and Sharjah (2007). She is a member of the Asian Art Council at the Guggenheim Museum, Asia Art Archive in Hong Kong, and the Kochi-Muziris Biennale. She is a Trustee of the Sher-Gil Sundaram Arts Foundation (SSAF), Delhi, and the series editor of Art Documents (SSAF–Tulika Books).

She was awarded the Padma Shri for her contribution to Art by the Government of India in 2009. She has previously taught at a number of universities, including the Indian Institutes of Technology and Jawaharlal Nehru University, New Delhi.

Her husband was the artist Vivan Sundaram. In 2011, Hong Kong–based Asia Art Archive (AAA) digitized their archive and held an exhibition titled, Another Life at the Jawaharlal Nehru University, New Delhi in February 2011.

== Biography ==
Geeta Kapur was born in 1943, to M. N. Kapur and Amrita Kapur. Theatre director Anuradha Kapur is her younger sister. She grew up on the campus of Modern School, New Delhi, where her father was Principal from 1947 to 1977. Her husband was the installation artist Vivan Sundaram. She was born in New Delhi, where she continues to live and work.

Kapur holds a bachelor's degree in Economics from Miranda House, University of Delhi (1962); a master's degree in Fine Arts from New York University, New York (1964); and a master's degree in Criticism from the Royal College of Art, London (1970).

She taught in the Humanities and Social Sciences department of IIT Delhi from 1967 to 1973. She lectures internationally and has held Visiting Fellowships at the Indian Institute of Advanced Study in Shimla, Clare Hall at the University of Cambridge, and Nehru Memorial Museum & Library in Teen Murti, New Delhi.

== Curated exhibitions ==
- Pictorial Space, Rabindra Bhavan, Delhi, 1977.
- Focus: 4 Painters 4 Directions, Gallery Chemould, Mumbai, 1979.
- Contemporary Indian Art, Royal Academy of Arts, London, 1982 (with Richard Bartholomew and Akbar Padamsee).
- Hundred Years: From the NGMA Collection, National Gallery of Modern Art, New Delhi, 1994.
- 'Dispossession' in Africus: Johannesburg Biennale, Transitional Metropolitan Council, Johannesburg, 1995 (with Shireen Gandhy)
- Century City: Art and Culture in the Modern Metropolis, Tate Modern, London, 2001 (with Ashish Rajadhyaksha).
- Sub Terrain: Artworks in the Cityfold, Haus der Kulturen der Welt, Berlin, 2003.
- Crossing Generations diVerge: Forty Years of Gallery Chemould, National Gallery of Modern Art, Mumbai, 2003 (with Chaitanya Sambrani).
- Aesthetic Bind - Citizen Artist: forms of address, Chemould Prescott Road, Mumbai, 2013-2014.

== Books ==
- Geeta Kapur. Contemporary Indian Artists, Vikas Pub. 1978. ISBN 978-0-7069-0527-4.
- Apinan Poshyananda, Thomas McEveilley, Geeta Kapur and others. Contemporary Art in Asia: Traditions, Tensions, 1997.
- Geeta Kapur, When Was Modernism: Essays on Contemporary Cultural Practice in India, Tulika Books, 2000.
- Jean-Hubert Martin, Geeta Kapur and others, Cautionary Tales: Critical Curating, Tulika Books, 2007. ISBN 81-85229-14-7.
- Sabeena Gadihoke, Geeta Kapur and Christopher Pinney, Where Three Dreams Cross: 150 Years of Photography from India, Pakistan and Bangladesh, 2010.
