= Mera Pind (book) =

Mera Pind ਮੇਰਾ ਪਿੰਡ
- Author: Giani Gurdit Singh
- Language: Punjabi
- Subject: Folklore of Punjab
- Publisher: Sahit Prakashan, Chandigarh
- Publication date: 1961 First edition, 2026 23rd edition
- Publication place: India
- Media type: Print

Mera Pind is a book written by Giani Gurdit Singh. In continuous print, since it was first published in 1961, the book is considered a classic in the Punjabi language.

Writing in The Illustrated Weekly of India, Khushwant Singh wrote; "Mera Pind by Giani Gurdit Singh is a collection of delightful essays on various aspects of village life in the Eastern Punjab. The book gives us a lively picture of pastoral life, written in delectable prose, studded with aphorisms, anecdotes, proverbs and songs. The one thing that will give Mera Pind a long lease of life, if not immortality, is the fact that the author has used the Punjabi language as it is spoken by the common people, The Punjabi of Mera Pind is full-blooded, rugged and masculine."

The critic Gurbachan Singh Talib wrote in The Tribune in 1961: "This is one of the most absorbing books which have appeared in Punjabi during the last few years. It brings in prose throbbing with enthusiasm, the entire panorama of the most romantic and picturesque aspects of rural Punjab and a phase of our culture which, after thousands of years, is now machine age, and the rising tide of political and democratic consciousness….The author, one of the research top writers of Punjabi and perhaps the most penetrating student on the Sikh scripture, the Granth Sahib, has brought alive his subject not only with encyclopaedic thoroughness but also in prose which is living like the dances and the songs of which it is narrative. It contains more folk music and commentary thereon than has so far appeared in Punjabi or in any other Indian language for the matter of that."

In his article titled "Life as culture history of Malwa," critic and writer Dr Jaspal Singh writes, "Mera Pind by Giani Gurdit Singh is a veritable cultural museum in words… It begins as an autobiography, assumes the character of a biography of his village Mitthewal and ultimately turns out to be the story of the people in eastern Malwa and southern Puad."

The first book cover was a representation of the Phulkari embroidery. In the past two decades, covers have been designed by the artist R. M. Singh It is a recommended text for the Masters classes in Punjabi literature by various universities. The book is known as the dictionary of the cultural legacy of the Punjab.
