= Laal Batti =

Novel by Baldev Singh

- Author: Baldev Singh
- Language: Punjabi
- Genre: Novel
- Set in: Kolkata
- Media type: print

Laal Batti (Punjabi: ਲਾਲ ਬੱਤੀ) is a Punjabi novel written by Baldev Singh.

== Synopsis ==
The novel revolves around the red light area Sonagachi in Kolkata and the lives of the prostitutes and other people living there. The novel is divided into several chapters and each chapter describes the cruel life and day-to-day harassment and other troubles faces by the prostitutes here. The author tried to prove that many people have wrong or unclear idea about the people living in these areas.

== Publication ==
The author did a decade's personal study and research to write this novel. While continuing studies he had to face harassment several times. The novel was translated into several languages including Hindi, and Punjabi (Shahmukhi).
