= Anita Kapur =

Indian IRS officer

Chairperson, Central Board of Direct Taxes (CBDT)
- Incumbent
- Assumed office Nov 1, 2014
- Preceded by: K. V. Chowdary

Anita Kapur is an Indian IRS officer. She is former Chairperson of the Central Board of Direct Taxes (CBDT), the apex authority of the Indian Income Tax department. She is a 1978-batch officer of the Income Tax cadre, was until now serving as Member (Legislation and Computerisation and Income Tax) in the CBDT.
