= Kewal Dhaliwal =

Punjabi theatre director

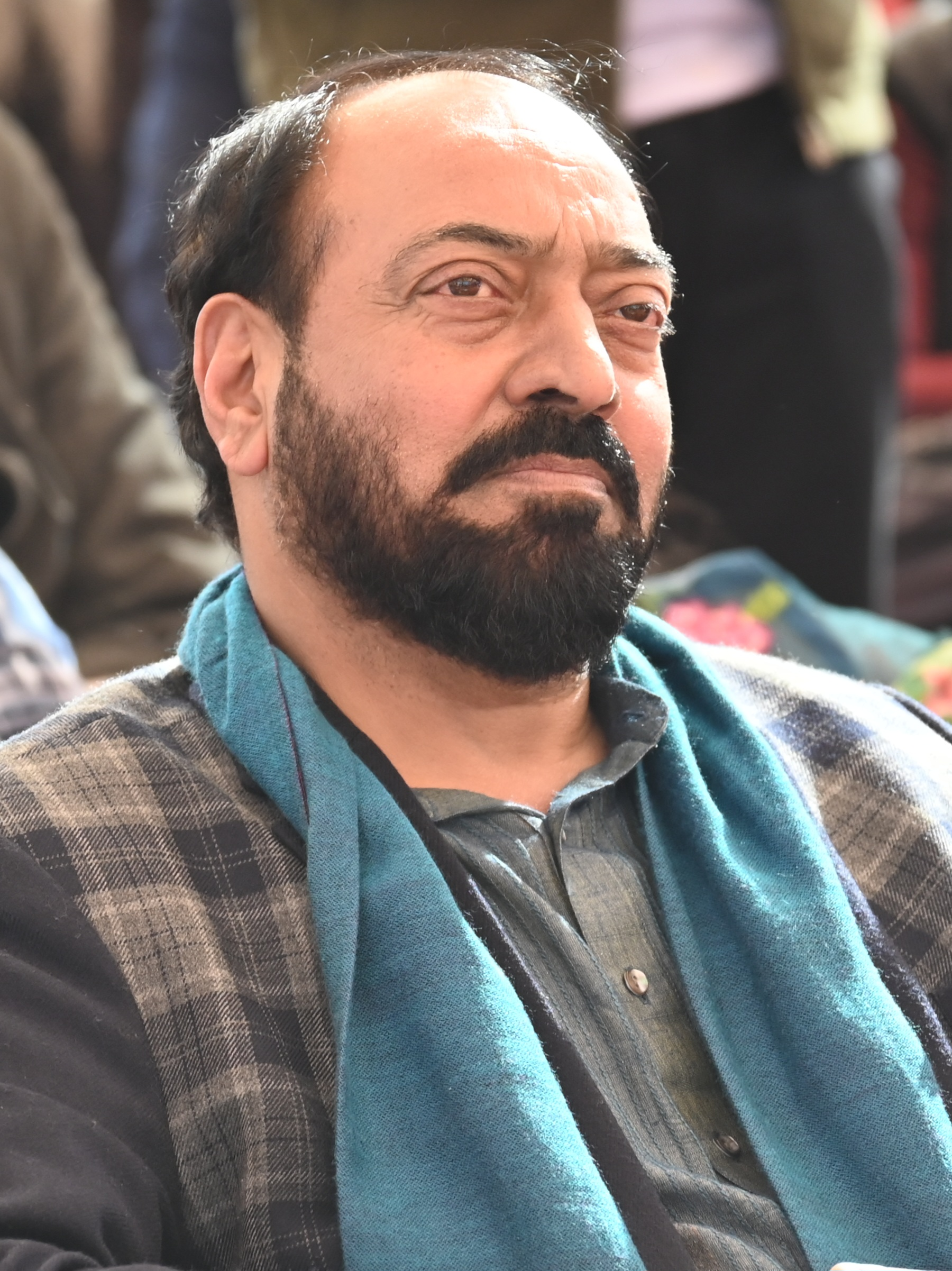
- Born: 7 October 1964 (age 62); Ajnala, Amritsar district, Punjab, India
- Education: National School of Drama
- Occupation: Theatre director
- Years active: 1978–present
- Organization: Manch Rangmanch

Kewal Dhaliwal (born 7 October 1964) is a Punjabi playwright, theatre director and president of Punjab Sangeet Natak Akademi Chandigarh. An alumnus of the National School of Drama, Dhaliwal has been active in theater for more than forty-seven years.

== Life ==
Kewal Dhaliwal was born in a village near Ajnala, Amritsar district, Punjab in the family of Shiv Singh and Mohinder Kaur. In 1978, he joined the theatre group of Gursharan Bhaji as an artist and worked there for ten years. In 1988, Dhaliwal joined the National School of Drama. Then he came to Amritsar and set up Punjabi Theatre Group Manch Rangmanch.

== Plays ==
=== Plays produced and directed by Kewal Dhaliwal ===
No.	Name of Play	Writer
1.	Heer Waris Shah	Waris Shah
2.	Tuglaq	Girish Karnad
3.	White Nights	Dostovaski/ Davinder Daman
4.	Andha Yug	Dharamveer Bharti
5.	Ashad Ka Ek Din	Mohan Rakesh
6.	Mrichchhakatika	Shudrak
7.	Ghasiram Kotwal	Vijay Tendulkar
8.	Saiyan Bhaye Kotwal	Vasant Sabnis
9.	The House of Barnada Alba	Federico García Lorca
10.	Blood Wedding	Federico García Lorca
11.	Chakarviyu	Rattan Thiyam
12.	The Caucasian Chalk Circle	Bartolt Brecht

One of his plays is about the sixteenth-century Punjabi folk hero Dullah Bhatti; the play was described in The Tribune as "about the collective tragedy of a community ... present[ing] a sharp commentary on social injustices, administrative oppression and a systemic failure for the weak and the vulnerable".

=== Play collections ===
- Mavan
- Aje Taan Supne Sulghde
- Dhukhda Roh
- Jajbian De Aar Paar

=== Plays for children ===
- Shahir Saleti
- Rajya Raj Krendya

=== Plays ===
- Itihas De Safe Te
- Sarkar e Khalsa
- Mera Rang De Basanti Chola

=== Edited plays ===
- Das Baal Natak
- Das Nukad Natak
- It Marg Pair Dreejai
- Purja Purja Kat Mare
- Bal Hua Bandhan Chhoote

=== Articles on theatre ===
- Rangkarmi Di Teesri Akhkh

== Productions ==
- Nora (Navnindra Behl)
- Ma (Maxim Gorki)
- Medni (Swaraj Bir)
- Shayari (Swaraj Bir)
- Kabir (S N Sewak)
- Kaidon (Shahiryar)
- Kort Marshal (Savdesh Deepak)
- Tasveeran (Swaraj Bir)
- Pul-sirat (Swaraj Bir)
