= Kishen Singh Kapoor =

Indian mathematician

- Born: 1873
- Died: 1936 (aged 62–63)

Kishen Singh Kapoor (1873–1936) was a mathematician, author and a teacher.

== Biography ==
He was the eldest son of Bhai Jassa Singh who had migrated to Amritsar city from Kabul, Afghanistan. Bhai Kishan Singh was educated in Lahore. He was the first Sikh Principal of Khalsa College, Amritsar, the pioneer Sikh institution in India.

He was a professor of Maths at the College Amritsar in 1897, and on 30 April 1898 when the principal, Vere O'Ratigan, left the College, Kishen Singh was called upon to officiate as Principal, thus becoming the first Sikh Principal of the College. He again took over the reins of Principal of the College on 15 August 1899 when John Campbell Oman left the College to sail to England.

He was the author of books on mathematics, published by Janki Dass & Sons, which served as text books for schools and colleges by the Government of Punjab. He was a President of Amritsar Temperance Society. The most notable event during his tenure as Principal was the visit of Lord Curzon, the then Viceroy and Governor General of India to campus of Khalsa College, Amritsar. Later he was a member of Senate of Punjab University, where he served till 1936.

== Private life ==
He married Hukum Kaur of Dera Baba Nanak in 1898 and they had two children, a son and a daughter. His daughter, Sukhwant Kaur, was born in 1901. Hisson, Kulwant Singh, was born in 1907.
