= Shiv G. Kapoor =

American engineer

Shiv Gopal Kapoor is the Grayce Wicall Gauthier Chair professor at the University of Illinois at Urbana–Champaign. His interests are manufacturing technologies and material machining. He attended the University of Wisconsin–Madison for his Ph.D. in Mechanical Engineering.

Kapoor was made an honorary member of the American Society of Mechanical Engineers in 2016 in recognition of his contributions to manufacturing engineering over 30 years.
