= Ratna Kapur =

Indian law professor

- Education: University of Cambridge (BA, MA); Harvard Law School (LL.M.)
- Occupations: Law professor, legal scholar
- Employers: Queen Mary University of London (Visiting Professor); Harvard Law School, Institute for Global Law & Policy; Jindal Global Law School (Former Professor)
- Notable work: Erotic Justice: Law and the New Politics of Post-Colonialism (2005); Makeshift Migrants and Law: Gender, Belonging and Postcolonial Anxieties (2010); Gender, Alterity and Human Rights: Freedom in a Fishbowl (2018)

Ratna Kapur is an Indian law professor and former director of the Centre for Feminist Legal Research in New Delhi, India (1995–2012).

== Education and career ==
Kapur has a B.A. and M.A. from Cambridge University and an LL.M. from Harvard Law School. She is a visiting professor of law at Queen Mary University of London and a senior faculty member at the International Global Law and Policy Institute at Harvard Law School. Previously, she was a professor at Jindal Global Law School in India.

Kapur has practiced law in India and has been a visiting professor at universities in India and abroad, including Yale Law School, New York University School of Law, Georgetown University Law Center, UN Peace University (Costa Rica), and the National Law School of India University, Bangalore. She has also been a visiting fellow at Cambridge University and Harvard University.

In addition to her academic work, Kapur has been the Gender Adviser at the United Nations Mission in Nepal.

She has taught and published on topics such as human rights, international law, postcolonial theory, and legal theory. Kapur is on the advisory boards of the academic journals Legal Studies and Signs: Journal of Women in Culture and Society.

== Works ==
Ratna Kapur has written on issues such as Triple Talaq, the right to die, sex work, same-sex marriage, marital rape, sexual harassment, etc.

=== Books ===
- An edited collection entitled Feminist Terrains in Legal Domains: Interdisciplinary Essays on Women and Law (Kali for Women, New Delhi, 1996)
- She has co-authored Subversive Sites: Feminist Engagements with Law (1996) with Brenda Cossman;
- Secularism's Last Sigh?: Hinduvata and the (Mis)Rule of Law (Oxford University Press, 1999, reprinted 2001).
- Erotic Justice: Law and the New Politics of Post-colonialism (Cavendish: London, 2005)
- Makeshift Migrants and Law: Gender, Belonging and Postcolonial Anxieties (Routledge, 2010)
- Gender, Alterity and Human Rights: Freedom in a Fishbowl (Edward Elgar Publishers, Legal Theory Series, 2018)

=== Selected publications ===
- "The (Im)-Possibility of Queering International Law", in Dianne Otto, ed., Queering International Human Rights (Rutledge 2017)
- The Colonial Debris of Bandung: Equality and Facilitating the Rise of the Hindu Right" in Luis Eslava, Michael Fakhri and Vasuki Nesiah, eds., Bandung, Global History and International Law: Critical Pasts and Pending Futures ( Cambridge University Press, 2017)
- Book Reviews: On Wendy Doniger and Martha Nussbaum, eds. Pluralism and Democracy in India" 31(3) Journal of Religion and Law 406 (2016)
- Book Review: On Ben Golder, Foucault and the Politics of Rights,39(4) University of New South Wales Law Journal 1472 (2016)
- "Precarious Desires and Ungrievable Lives: Human Rights and Postcolonial Critiques of Legal Justice" 3(2) London Review of International Law 267 (2015)
- "The "Ayodhya" Case: Hindu Majoritarianism and the Right to Religious Liberty" 29 Maryland Journal of International Law 305 (Fall 2014)
- "In the Aftermath of Critique We are not in Epistemic Free Fall: Human Rights, the Subaltern Subject, and the Non-Liberal Search for Freedom and Happiness" 25 (1) Law and Critique 25–45 (2014)
- "A Leap of Faith: The Construction of Hindu Majoritarianism through Secular Law" 113 (1) South Atlantic Quarterly 109–128 (2014).
- "Brutalized Bodies and Sexy Dressing on the Indian Street" 40 SIGNS: Journal of Women in Culture and Society 1 (2014)
- "Gender, Sovereignty, and the Rise of a Sexual Security Regime in International Law and Postcolonial India", 14(2) Melbourne Journal of International Law 1–26 (2013)
- "Hecklers to Power? The Waning of Liberal Rights and Challenges to Feminism in South Asia" in Ania Loomba and Ritty Lukose, eds., South Asian Feminisms, 333–355 (Duke University Press 2012)
- "Emancipatory Feminist Theory in Postcolonial India" in Aakash Rathore Singh and Silika Mohapatra (eds.) Indian Political Thought: A Reader, 257–268 (Routledge 2010)
- "De-Radicalizing the Rights Claims of Sexual Subalterns Through 'Tolerance'" in Kim Brooks and Robert Leckey, eds., Queer Empire: Comparative Theory, 37–52 (Routledge, 2010)
- "Normalizing Violence: Transnational Justice and the Gujarat Riots" 15:3 Columbia Journal of Gender and Human Rights 885–927 (2006)
- "Human Rights in the 21st Century: Taking a Walk on the Dark Side", 28:4 Sydney Law Review 665–687 (2006)
- "The Tragedy of Victimization: Implications for International Women's Rights and Post-Colonial Feminist Legal Politics", 15 Harvard Human Rights Journal, 1 (Spring, 2002)
- "The Right to Freedom of Religion and Secularism in the Indian Constitution" in Mark Tushnet and Vicki Jackson, eds, Defining the Field of Comparative Constitutional Law, 199–213 (Praeger Publishers 2002)
- "Secularism's Last Sigh? Democracy, the Hindu Right and Law in India" 38:1 Harvard International Law Journal (January 1997).
