= Pradeep Kumar Kapur =

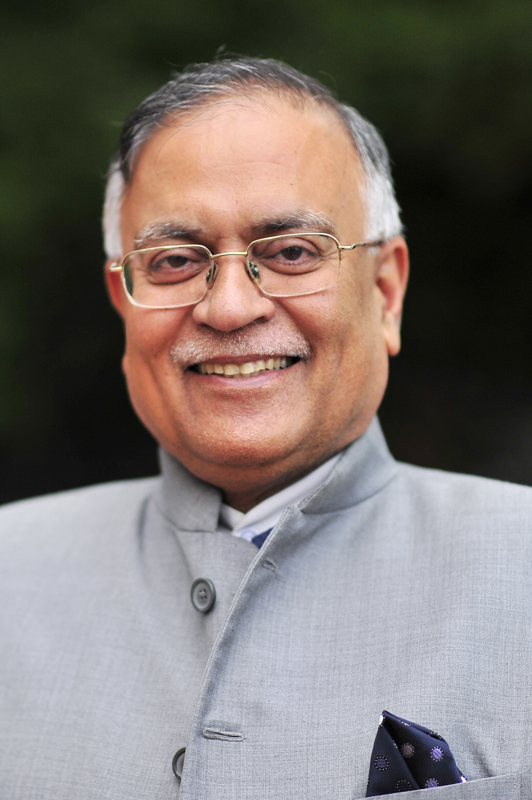

India Ambassador to Cambodia
- In office April 2001 – January 2005

India Ambassador to Chile
- In office January 2009 – December 2013

Personal details
- Born: 1954 (age 71–72) Indian
- Education: (B.Tech) (M.Tech); IIT Delhi
- Profession: Foreign Service

Ambassador Pradeep Kumar Kapur (Hindi: प्रदीप कुमार कपूर) (born 1954) is an Indian academic and retired diplomat of the Indian Foreign Service who is currently Visiting Clinical Professor, International Trade, Development and Security Issues at the School of Public Policy, University of Maryland. He joined the Indian Foreign Service in 1979 and he attained the rank of Secretary, Ministry of External Affairs, Government of India in 2013. Described as a "luminary" diplomat, he was first in his batch to be appointed as ambassador in the year 2000. He served first as India’s ambassador to the Kingdom of Cambodia and later as ambassador to the Republic of Chile.

== Education ==
Kapur received a Bachelor of Technology in Electrical Engineering in 1977 from the Indian Institute of Technology, Delhi. In 1979, he received a Master of Technology in Management and Systems from IIT, Delhi.

== Career ==
As a career Indian Foreign Service officer from 1979 to 2013, Kapur held many government posts both in India and abroad. From April 2001 to January 2005 he was the Indian ambassador to Cambodia. From October 2007 through January 2009, he was joint Secretary of the Foreign Service Institute in New Delhi. From January 2009 to December 2013 he was the Indian ambassador to Chile.

== Publications ==
Kapur's publications include India ASEAN Relations (2002), Ta Prohm: A Glorious Era in Angkor Civilization (co-authored, 2007), India of My Dreams (co-edited, 2008), Connecting World Heritage Sites and Civilizations (2013, Universidad Mayor Santiago).
