= Nandita Mahtani =

Indian fashion designer

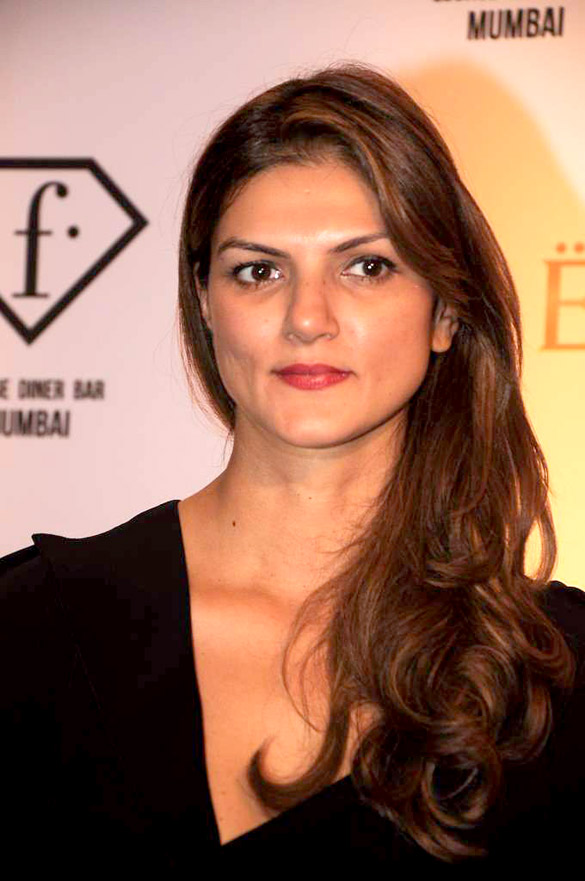
- Occupation: Fashion designer
- Spouse: Sanjay Kapur (m. 1996; div. 2000)

Nandita Mahtani (born 1975) is an Indian fashion designer.

== Career ==
Mahtani, along with Dino Morea, run a company called Playground. Mahtani has been designing and styling cricketer Virat Kohli.

In 2023 Nandita teamed up with her sister Anu Hinduja to launch the luxury fashion brand, AN-Y1.

== Personal life ==
Nandita Mahtani was married to businessman Sanjay Kapur for four years, from 1996 to 2000. She also dated Bollywood actors Ranbir Kapoor and Dino Morea and was engaged to Vidyut Jamwal.

Nandita's sister Anu Mahtani is married to Sanjay Hinduja, the son of industrialist Gopichand Hinduja.
