= Shruti Kapoor =

Indian economist, women's rights activist, and social entrepreneur

- Born: Kanpur, India
- Education: Marquette University (Master's); University of California, Riverside (PhD)
- Occupations: Economist, Women's rights activist, Social entrepreneur
- Employer(s): World Bank (Formerly), Sayfty (Founder)
- Known for: Founder of Sayfty
- Website: Sayfty

Shruti Kapoor (born 25 September) is an Indian economist, women's rights activist, and social entrepreneur. She is the founder of Sayfty, an initiative that aims to educate and empower young women and girls against all forms of violence.

== Early life and education ==
Born in Kanpur, India, Kapoor moved to the United States in 2000. After earning a master's degree in economics from Marquette University, she worked as an economist for the World Bank in Washington, D.C., for two years. Following this, she moved to California to complete her PhD in economics, and continued as a consultant for the World Bank. After earning her doctorate degree, Kapoor taught economics at Occidental College for a year.

== Work ==
Kapoor founded Sayfty in June 2013 to educate and empower young women and girls against all forms of violence. The initiative focuses on training young women and girls in self-defense, using safety tools such as pepper-spray, increasing awareness of laws and legal rights, and creating dialogue around safety and what makes women feel unsafe. Sayfty received the People's Choice Award by Femvertising in 2015. Kapoor founded Sayfty in the aftermath of the 2012 Delhi gang rape and murder of a 23-year-old female, which shocked the country and garnered global media attention.

In May 2019, Kapoor started a public petition on Charge.org to oppose two shelters for women and children in her neighborhood of Park Slope, Brooklyn, New York City. She argued that "locating two large buildings for the homeless on two adjacent blocks is not fair to our community," and that they would have "a negative impact on the property value," although no evidence was provided regarding the effect of homeless shelters on property values.

== Public speaking ==
As an activist, she has addressed many public forums including the Youth Assembly at the United Nations in August 2016.

In August 2017, Shruti delivered a Talk at 2017 Summer Youth Assembly at the United Nations, addressing her work around the use of technology to address gender equality.

In March 2017, Shruti moderated a panel on young women as economic forces at youth forum (CSW61) at the United Nations.

In January 2017, Shruti addressed the Winter Youth Assembly at the United Nations. She talked about Young Women's Economic Empowerment.

In November 2016, In celebration of the International Day for the Elimination of Violence against Women, Organized by UN Women and the United Nations Inter-Agency Network on Youth Development, Shruti talked about the impact of violence against women on young women's economic empowerment.

In August 2016, Shruti addressed the Summer Youth Assembly at the United Nations on two separate panels. Her first talk focused on Youth Involvement at the United Nations. The second talk focused on Investing in Young Women's Leadership.

== Awards and recognition ==
Kapoor is named by Apolitical as One of the Most Influential People in Global Policy 2019.

Indian Ministry of Women and Child Development facilitated Kapoor as one of the 30 #WebWonderWomen who have been driving positive agenda of social change via social media.

Richtopia named Kapoor as one of the top 100 leaders from multilateral organizations globally in 2018.

Kapoor served on the judging panel for Anu and Naveen Jain's $1 million, Women Safety Xprize competition.

She is the recipient of the International Women Of The Year Award by Aosta Valley, Italy (2015). She was the 2nd runners up. She also received the Rex Karamveer Global Fellowship on 23 March, in New Delhi at the exclusive awards function, which is a part of “iCONGO’s REX Conclive, organized on 21st, 22nd, `and 23rd of March 2015.

In March 2016, she was one of the EU top 200 Women in the World of Development Wall of Fame. She was also one of the nominated changemakers for the United State of Women 2016. She is a three-time story award winner with World Pulse

In September 2016, Shruti was one of the women shortlisted for the Rising Stars Award 2016 by We are the City India, which she went onto win. In October 2016, she was recognized as one of the "52 Feminists" by 52Feminists.com.
