= V.K. Kapoor =

Professor V.K. Kapoor is Vice Chancellor of Raffles University, Neemrana, Rajasthan. He is also head and professor of the Department of Law. He has worked as Professor of law for four decades in various University including University of Jammu and distinguished visitors of various universities. He has thirteen papers published in journals, has drafted the J & K Jail Manual, has guided many PhDs, and has organised many seminars, conferences and moot courts.
