= Yes Bank =

Indian private sector bank headquartered in Mumbai

YES BANK
- Type: Public
- Traded as: BSE: 532648; NSE: YESBANK
- ISIN: INE528G01035
- Industry: Banking, Financial services
- Founded: 2003; 23 years ago
- Founders: Rana Kapoor; Ashok Kapur
- Headquarters: Mumbai, Maharashtra, India
- Key people: Rama Subramaniam Gandhi (Non-Executive, Part-time chairman, Independent Director); Vinay M. Tonse (MD & CEO)
- Products: Credit cards; Consumer banking; Corporate banking; Finance and insurance; Mortgage loans; Private banking; Wealth management; Investment banking
- Revenue: ▲₹36,928 crore (US$3.9 billion) (2026)
- Operating income: ▲₹5,506 crore (US$590 million) (2026)
- Net income: ▲₹3,476 crore (US$370 million) (2026)
- Total assets: ▲₹469,105 crore (US$50 billion) (2026)
- Total equity: ▲₹51,062 crore (US$5.5 billion) (2026)
- Number of employees: 29,577 (2026)
- Capital ratio: ▲15.3% (CRAR)
- Website: www.yes.bank.in

Yes Bank (stylised in all caps) is an Indian private sector bank, headquartered in Mumbai. Founded in 2004 by Rana Kapoor and Ashok Kapur (Incorporated in 2003). It serves both retail and corporate customers. Its network is spread across 300 districts in India and comprises 1,300 branches, 200+ Business Correspondent Banking Outlets (BCBOs) and 1,350 ATMs.

== History ==
In 1997–98, three Mumbai-based bankers–Rana Kapoor, Ashok Kapur and Harkirat Singh–co-founded Rabo India Finance in partnership with Rabobank of the Netherlands. In early 2003, the three bankers started Yes Bank with proceeds from selling their stakes in Rabo India Finance. Harkirat Singh resigned in April 2003 citing concerns over Rabobank's influence in appointing a leader for Yes Bank.

In May 2004, Yes Bank obtained banking license from the Reserve Bank of India (RBI). Initially, Rana Kapoor and Ashok Kapur each held 26% in the bank, Rabobank owned 20%, newly-appointed directors were allocated 3% and private equity firms held the remaining 25%. The bank opened its first branch in August 2004.

Yes Bank was listed on the stock exchanges of India after its IPO in June 2005 at a face value of ₹10 and an issue price of ₹35.

In November 2008, co-founder and non-executive chairman Ashok Kapur was killed at the Trident Hotel during the 26/11 terrorist attacks in Mumbai.

In September 2016, Yes Bank scrapped its proposed $1 billion share sale due to market conditions. The company subsequently attempted to relaunch its failed capital raising exercise after appointing a new set of bankers.

By early 2020, the financial position of Yes Bank had deteriorated as it had been unable to raise capital. This had resulted in potential loan losses, which in turn led to downgrades and prompted investors to invoke bond covenants, and a withdrawal of deposits by customers.

On 5 March 2020, the RBI took over Yes Bank in a bailout provision. RBI reconstructed Yes Bank's board, naming Prashant Kumar, former chief financial officer and deputy managing director of State Bank of India, as its MD & CEO, along with Sunil Mehta, former non-executive chairman of Punjab National Bank, as the non-executive chairman. Under the RBI's mandate, State Bank of India, HDFC Bank, ICICI Bank, Axis Bank and other financial institutions infused funds to help Yes Bank through a reconstruction scheme.

In July 2020, Yes Bank completed its follow-on public offer (FPO).

In April 2021, India's market regulator Securities and Exchange Board of India (SEBI) proposed a fine of ₹250 million (US$3.38 million) on Yes Bank, stating that it had fraudulently sold AT1 bonds without the necessary warnings and risk assessments. In May 2021, the Securities Appellate Tribunal (SAT) imposed an interim stay on SEBI's order.

On 21 February 2023, it issued 2,13,650 equity shares to its employees under the company ESOP plan.

In April 2026, Vinay M. Tonse appointed as the new managing director and CEO of Yes Bank.

On 15 October 2026, the Supreme Court dismissed Yes Bank's, the RBI's and the Union government's appeals and upheld the quashing of the bank's 2020 write-down of ₹8,415 crore (US$900 million) in AT1 bonds, making the reversal final; Yes Bank's shares fell around 20% intraday on the news. On 30 October 2026, Axis Trustee Services a three-day notice to Yes bank directing the financial institution to restore the amount of AT-1 bonds.

== Shareholding ==
The Sumitomo Mitsui Banking Corporation is the largest shareholder in Yes Bank, holding 24.9% of the shares. While the State Bank of India (SBI), the largest scheduled commercial bank in India, was the largest shareholder in Yes Bank, the State Bank of India (SBI) has sold a 13.18% stake in Yes Bank to Japan's Sumitomo Mitsui Banking Corporation (SMBC) for ₹8,889 crore, a deal that was completed in September 2025. Currently SBI holds 10.8% of the shares. Yes Bank has also received investments from international private equity firms, namely Advent International and The Carlyle Group.

Prominent shareholders

Shareholder	Percentage
Sumitomo Mitsui Banking Corporation	24.9%
State Bank of India	10.8%
Verventa Holdings (Advent)	8.5%
Life Insurance Corporation of India	4.0%
BlackRock	2.7%
Vanguard	2.5%
Kotak Mutual Fund	0.9%
HDFC Bank	0.8%
ICICI Bank	0.7%
Others	44.3%

== Operations ==
Yes Bank operates in retail, MSME and Corporate banking sectors from 1,300 branches and 1,350 ATMs and cash recyclers in over 700 cities. It serves corporate and retail customers through retail banking and asset management services.

In 2015, the bank ventured into green bond issuance to finance renewable energy projects like solar, wind, biomass, and small hydropower.

In October 2017, the bank launched a digital wallet known as Yes Pay, integrating with BHIM and UPI. On 3 November 2017, Yes Bank signed a MoU with the government to provide ₹10 billion (equivalent to ₹15 billion or US$160 million in 2026) financing for food processing projects.

As of September 2018, Yes Bank had taken syndicated loans from eight large international entities including ADB, OPIC, European Investment Bank, banks in Taiwan and Japan for amounts ranging from US$30 million to US$410 million.

Yes Bank acquired a 24.19% stake in the direct-to-home (DTH) company, Dish TV, on 30 May 2020.

In March 2024, Yes Bank became the official banking partner for the Indian contingent at the 2024 Summer Olympics in Paris.

In May 2024, Yes Bank partnered with EBANX, a fintech company focused on cross-border e-commerce payments, to enable payments from India.

In March 2026, M1 NXT partnered with the bank to provide digital cross-border factoring solutions with regards to exporters in India.

== Subsidiaries ==
=== YES Securities ===
YES Securities (India) Limited (YSIL), which was founded in 2013, is a subsidiary of YES Bank. It provides personalized financial services to Retail, HNI/UHNI, and Institutional clients, such as wealth broking, institutional equity sales and trading research.

== 2020 bailout ==
=== Moratorium ===
On 5 March 2020, the Reserve Bank of India (RBI) announced that, in the interest of its customers and depositors, it would suspend and supersede Yes Bank's board and impose a 30-day moratorium on its operations. The RBI cited Yes Bank's failures to raise new funding to cover its non-performing assets, inaccurate statements of confidence in its ability to receive new funding, and its underreporting of its non-performing assets, among other factors, as the reasons for the moratorium.

On 6 March 2020, ICRA downgraded the rating of Yes Bank's ₹526 billion (US$7.1 billion) in core bonds to a "D" rating, while Moody's downgraded them to "Caa3".

During the moratorium period, Yes Bank customers could withdraw only up to ₹50,000 (US$674.77) from their accounts for the following one month, except in certain situations like medical treatment, emergencies, higher education costs and obligatory expenses for ceremonies such as weddings (subject to RBI's approval). The moratorium disrupted multiple e-commerce services whose users were struggling to make online transactions or use payment services like UPI.

RBI governor Shaktikanta Das stated that the matter would be resolved swiftly; Ministry of Finance under Finance Minister, Nirmala Sitharaman announced a proposed turnaround plan under which the State Bank of India would take a 49% stake in Yes Bank and introduce a new board. On 13 March 2020, the Union Cabinet approved the reconstruction scheme for Yes Bank, stating that within three days of the notification of the scheme, the moratorium would be lifted. During this reconstruction, seven investors infused ₹120 billion (US$1.62 billion) in Yes Bank, and Prashant Kumar was proposed as it new CEO. These investors included State Bank of India, ICICI Bank, HDFC Bank, Axis Bank, Kotak Mahindra Bank, Rakesh Jhunjhunwala, Radhakishan Damani and Azim Premji Trust.

The bank came out of the moratorium and resumed full-fledged banking operations on 18 March 2020.

=== Reconstruction ===
Under the new management, Yes Bank's liquidity profile improved with a rise in deposits. The bank generated ₹150 billion (US$2.02 billion) via follow-on public offer in July 2020.

ICRA raised its ratings on securities issued by Yes Bank Ltd in September 2020. Low-level Basel II bonds and infrastructure bonds were raised to "BBB" from "BB+." Tier II bonds that are in line with Basel III were raised from "BB" to "BBB-." Tier I and higher tier II bonds that were compliant with Basel II were raised from a default rating to a "BB" rating.

Moody's changed Yes Bank's long term issuer rating from Caa1 to B3 in August 2020. In November 2020, CARE Ratings revised its rating on the YES Bank's infrastructure bonds to 'CARE BBB' from the previous 'CARE B'. It also revised its outlook to 'Stable' from the previous ‘Under credit watch with developing implications’ on the above-mentioned instruments. Yes Bank's Upper Tier II Bonds and Perpetual Bonds (Basel II) received a revised rating of 'CARE BB+' from previous 'CARE D'.

In June 2021, the board approved ₹100 billion (US$1.35 billion) of fundraising by issuance of debt securities.

== See also ==
- Banking in India
- List of banks in India
- Indian Financial System Code
