= Rana Kapoor =

Indian banker (born 1957)

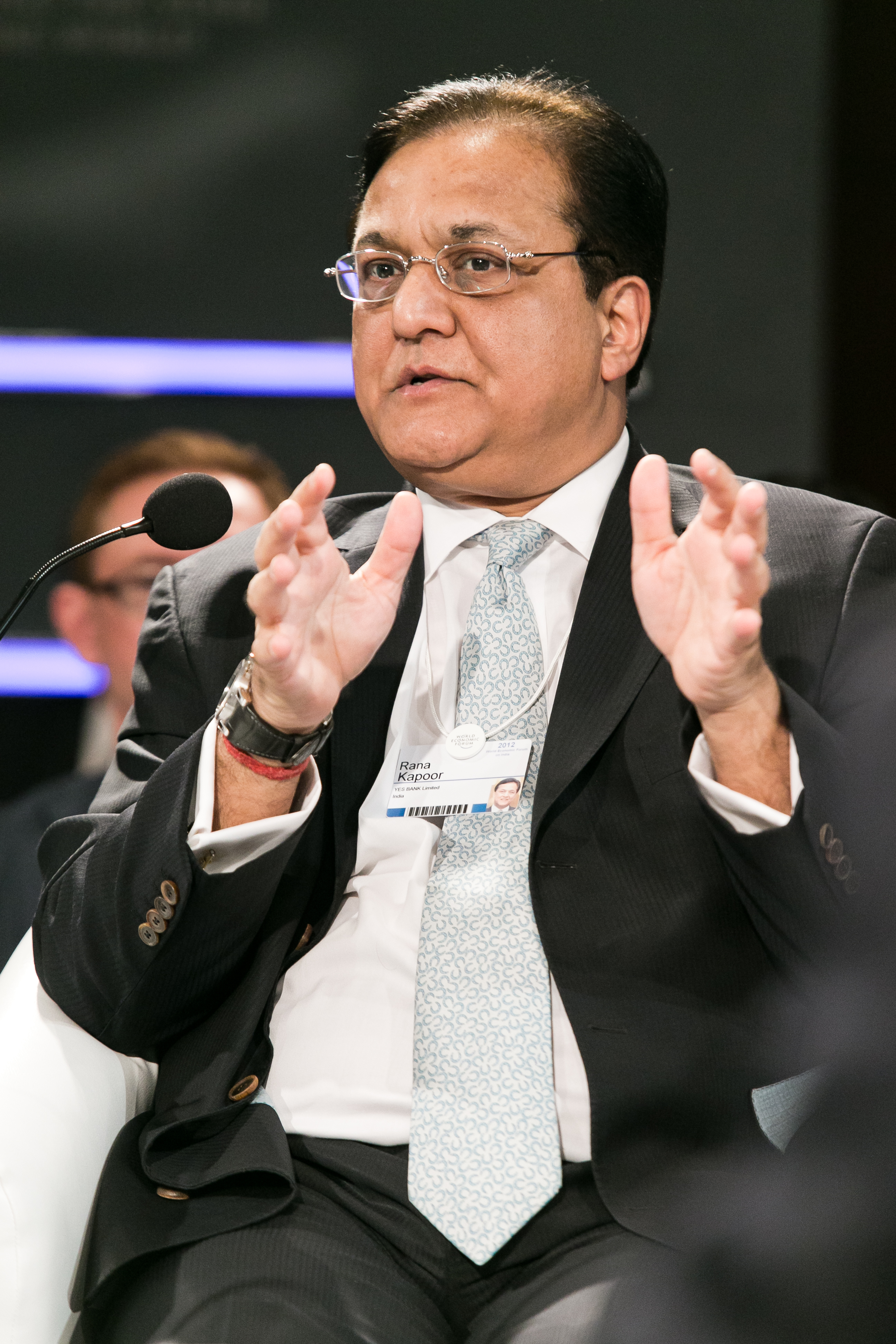
- Kapoor in 2012
- Born: 9 September 1957 (age 68); New Delhi, India
- Education: University of Delhi; Rutgers University
- Title: Co-founder, Yes Bank
- Spouse: Bindu Kapoor
- Children: 3 daughters
- Website: ranakapoor.in

Rana Kapoor (born 9 September 1957) is an Indian former banker who was the founder, managing director and CEO of Yes Bank, an Indian private sector bank. Following a career in financial institutions, he co-founded Yes Bank in 2003, with its registered office in Mumbai. He was CEO from its founding in 2003 to 2019. He also was appointed as the president of ASSOCHAM in July 2013, and was succeeded by Sunil Katoria after his two year term.

Kapoor was arrested on 8 March 2020 by India's Enforcement Directorate over accusations of fraud in excess of US$100 million. Rana Kapoor was granted bail in April 2024.

== Early life and education ==
Kapoor was born on 9 September 1957 and was brought up in New Delhi, India. He attended the Frank Anthony Public School in New Delhi in 1973 and earned his bachelor's degree from Shri Ram College of Commerce in 1977. He then obtained an MBA from Rutgers University in New Jersey, US in 1980. Kapoor received an honorary fellowship from All India Management Association (AIMA), President's Medal from Rutgers University, and an honorary PhD from GB Pant University of Agriculture & Technology.

== Banking career ==
Kapoor joined Bank of America (BoA) as a management trainee in 1980 and was presented with an eagle pin by the chairman two years later. He eventually went on to head the wholesale banking business which included several assignments in Asian countries. Kapoor worked at BoA for about 16 years, till 1996, where he managed corporate, government and financial institution clients.

Kapoor later joined ANZ Grindlays Investment Bank (ANZIB) as general manager & country head in 1996. He worked there for two years, until 1998.

=== Yes Bank ===
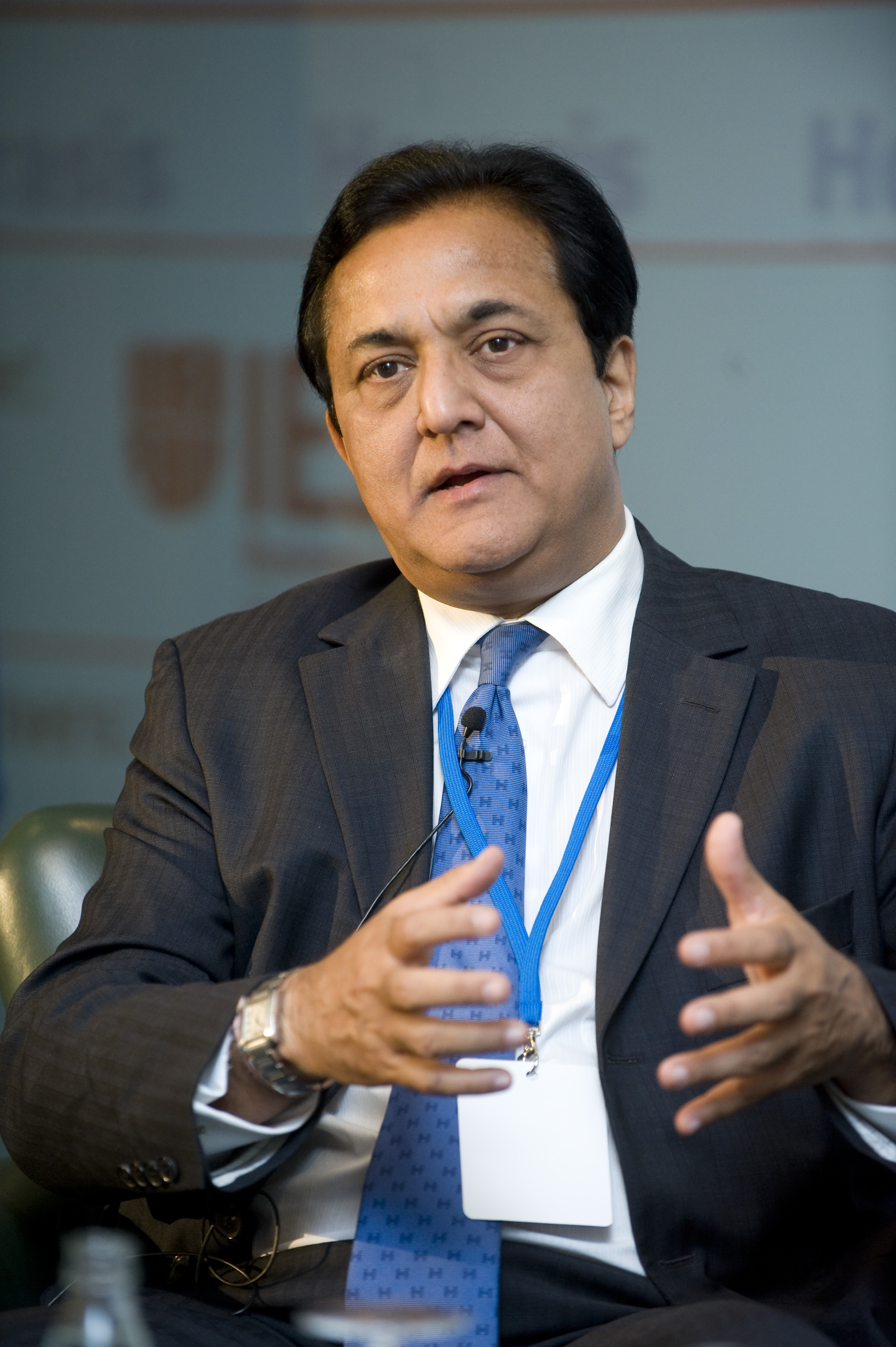
Kapoor in 2010

In February 1995, a team from Rabobank arrived in India, scouting for opportunities. Kapoor, his brother-in-law Ashok Kapoor and Harkirat Singh made a proposal to the visiting team for two joint ventures: a non-banking financial company and a bank. During the next year, Kapoor held meetings with the Rabobank executives in India, Singapore and the Netherlands. The NBFC was set up in 1997, with the three Indian partners chipping in with an equity capital of ₹90 million (equivalent to ₹460 million or US$4.8 million in 2023) each. In 2003, the three sold their stake for $10 million each, generating the seed fund for the bank. In 2003, the team was granted a banking license by the Reserve Bank of India (RBI) to set up Yes Bank. They established Yes Bank with the vision of "Building the Best Quality Bank of the world in India" by 2004.

Rana Kapoor held 26% stake in Yes Bank, Ashok Kapur held 11%, and Rabobank International held 20% stake. Ashok Kapur died in 2008 in Mumbai 26/11 attacks.

In 2005, Kapoor was named Ernst & Young's Start-up Entrepreneur of the Year.

In January 2017, Bloomberg noted that with the rising share price of Yes Bank, Kapoor had become a billionaire.

In September 2018, Yes Bank announced that they had ordered Kapoor to step down from his CEO position in January 2019. In July 2019, the Times of India reported that with a 78% drop in the Yes Bank share price since August 2018, Kapoor's net worth had fallen by over a billion to $377 million.

== Legal controversy ==
On 8 March 2020, the Enforcement Directorate (ED) registered a case against Kapoor under the Prevention of Money Laundering Act (PMLA) and he was arrested. Defense lawyer stated that Rana Kapoor was selectively targeted. The Central Bureau of Investigation (CBI) also charged Kapoor and his family members in a bribery and money-laundering case linked to Yes Bank. Kapoor denies the charges.

According to the ED, Kapoor, his family members, and others, got benefits worth ₹43 billion (US$450 million) through companies controlled by his family as kickbacks for sanctioning huge loans through Yes Bank. He is also accused of receiving bribes for going easy on loans given to a few big corporate groups that had turned into non-performing assets.

The CBI and ED arrested Kapoor in another case which is the outcome of their investigations in DHFL Mumbai case of fraud and embezzlement of over $3 Billion, in which Kapoor was alleged to have received over $100 million in kickbacks over bogus loans extended by Yes Bank to DHFL and the kickbacks were used to purchase expensive properties in Delhi and Mumbai in the name of Kapoor's wife Bindu Kapoor and daughter Roshni Kapoor.

In May 2020, ED filed a charge sheet and named 7 individuals and 5 companies Individuals: • Rana Kapoor • Bindu Kapoor (W/o Rana Kapoor) • Roshni Kapoor (Daughter of Rana Kapoor) • Radha Kapoor (Daughter of Rana Kapoor) • Rakhee Kapoor (Daughter of Rana Kapoor) • Dheeraj Wadhawan (DHFL promoter) • Pankaj Wadhawan (DHFL promoter)

Companies: • Morgan Credit Pvt. Ltd (MCPL) – a “promoter company of Yes Bank” and owned by Rana Kapoor’s daughters. • Yes Capital Pvt. Ltd (YCPL) – a “promoter company of Yes Bank” and owned by Rana Kapoor’s daughters. • RAB Enterprises was an investment company & owned by Rana Kapoor’s wife. • Dewan Housing Finance Limited • RKW Developers – owned by Dheeraj Wadhawan

Currently Kapoor is held at Taloja Jail, Maharashtra. Kapoor's bail application in the Prevention of Money Laundering case filed on the grounds that he is keeping poor health and is at the risk of contracting COVID-19, was rejected by Mumbai Court in April 2020.

On 4 August 2023, the Supreme Court refused to entertain bail plea of Yes Bank founder Rana Kapoor in a money-laundering case against him. The apex court noted that this case rocked the entire financial system.

== Personal life ==
Kapoor resides in Mumbai and is married to Bindu Kapoor. They have three daughters, Radha Kapoor Khanna, Rakhee Kapoor Tandon, and Roshini Kapoor. The CBI named his wife, Bindu, and all three daughters, as co-accused in the 2020 case of money laundering.

Ashok Kapur, with whom Kapoor co-founded Yes Bank, is his wife's sister's husband.

== Awards and achievements ==
- AAAI felicitated Kapoor with the award for pioneering banking & financing solutions to the Media and Communications Industry in the year 2018
- Asian Banker CEO Leadership Achievement Award for India during the 3-Year period, 2011-2013
- Entrepreneurial Banker of the Decade by Bombay Management Association in 2001-2010
- Best CEO-BFSI Hall of Fame:2014 IMM-JJ Awards for Excellence
- Received the SKOCH Award for significant contributions to Public Policies for Infrastructure Growth and National Development (2015)
- Exemplary Contribution To Entrepreneurship & Innovation by London Business School
