= Sunjay Kapur =

Indian businessman (1971–2025)

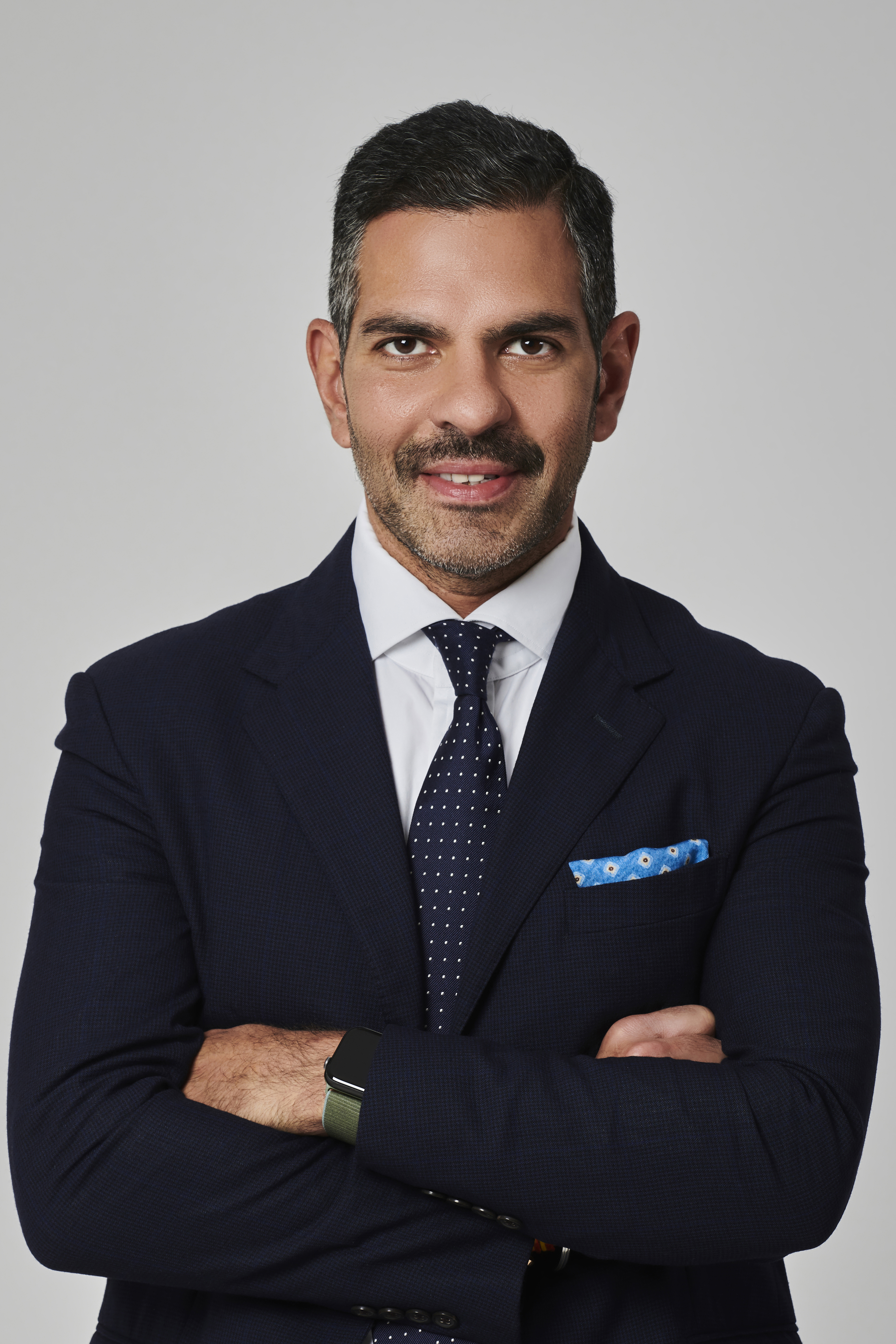
- Sunjay Kapur in 2021
- Born: 15 October 1971; Bombay, Maharashtra, India
- Died: 12 June 2025 (aged 53); Windsor, United Kingdom
- Education: Harvard Business School; University of Buckingham
- Occupations: Businessman, industrialist
- Years active: 1997–2025
- Known for: Chairman of the Sona Comstar; President of the Automotive Component Manufacturers Association (ACMA)
- Spouse(s): Nandita Mahtani (m. 1996; div. 2000) Karisma Kapoor (m. 2003; div. 2016) Priya Sachdev (m. 2017)
- Children: 3
- Family: Kapoor family (by marriage)

Sunjay Kapur (15 October 1971 – 12 June 2025) was an Indian-American multinational industrialist and billionaire. Kapur was the chairman of Sona Comstar, an automotive component manufacturer. He served as the chairperson of the Automotive Component Manufacturers Association (ACMA). He was the ex-husband of film actress Karisma Kapoor, a close friend of Prince William, and the founder of the Sona Group.

== Early life ==
Sunjay Kapur was born on 15 October 1971 to Rani Kapoor and Surinder Kapoor in Delhi. Kapur completed his schooling first from The Doon School in Dehradun and then from the Cathedral and John Connon School in Mumbai. He then went abroad to do his BBA in Corporate Strategy and HR from London. After this, he completed executive courses from MIT and Harvard Business School.

== Career ==
=== Sona Comstar ===
Kapur was the chairman of Sona Comstar, headquartered in Gurugram. The company manufactures 12 products via nine factories, in India, China, Mexico, Serbia and the US. The company provides spare parts for electric two-wheelers and three-wheelers. The company employs over 5,000 people in India, China, Mexico, Serbia and the United States. The company was founded in 1997 by his father, a pioneer in the Indian auto parts industry. After his father's death in 2015, Sanjay took over as the managing director.

As an American citizen, he was added to the list of the world's billionaires in 2022. According to Forbes, his net worth at the time of his death was $1.2 billion (₹ 10,300 crore), largely from Sona Comstar.

== Personal life ==
Kapur's first marriage was to Delhi-based fashion designer Nandita Mahtani in 1996. They divorced in 2000. In 2003, he married Hindi film actress Karisma Kapoor. The couple had two children, daughter Samaira, born in 2005, and son Kiaan, born in 2010. After a long legal battle, Sanjay and Karisma officially separated in 2016. Kapur's third marriage was to Priya Sachdev in 2017. A son, Azarius, was born to the couple.

=== Death ===
Kapur died on 12 June 2025 after collapsing during a polo match in England. He was 53. The Telegraph reported that he died suddenly after swallowing a bee while playing polo; however, the post-mortem report confirmed that he died due to left ventricular hypertrophy and ischemic heart disease.

== Sunjay Kapur inheritance dispute ==
Kapur's ₹30,000 crore estate has been involved in an inheritance dispute since his death.

After his death, his third wife, Priya Kapur, produced a March 2025 will. This will said Kapur that left the entire estate to Priya. This claim was challenged by both his mother Rani Kapur, and separately by his two children with Karisma Kapoor, all of whom alleged it to be a forged will.

The matter is being heard before the Delhi High Court and has also reached the Supreme Court of India. In May 2026, the Supreme Court referred the dispute to mediation, with the former Chief Justice of India DY Chandrachud having been appointed the mediator.
