= Kunal Kapoor (cricketer) =

Indian cricketer (born 1987)

Personal information
- Full name: Kunal Rajan Kapoor
- Born: 18 September 1987 (age 39); Bangalore, Karnataka, India
- Batting: Right-handed

Domestic team information
- Years: Team
- Karnataka
- Source: ESPNcricinfo, 23 October 2015

Kunal Kapoor (born 18 September 1987) is an Indian first-class cricketer who played for Karnataka. His first-class debut was against the Delhi cricket team on 8 December 2012 at the M. Chinnaswamy Stadium in Bengaluru, and his final game was against Mumbai in Bengaluru, in which he scored 0 and 2.
