= Sudarshan Kapoor =

Professor emeritus

Sudarshan Kapoor is an American professor emeritus at California State University at Fresno, where he taught for several decades. Kapoor is an advocate of non-violence, and an activist practicing Gandhi's philosophy at both the local and national levels. A supporter of the African-American struggle for justice, he also serves as a resource on its story.

== Professional life ==
Born in the Punjab, India, Kapoor emigrated to the United States in 1963.

In 1967 he began to teach at Cal State Fresno, where he became Professor of Social Work, Community Development and Peace Studies. He founded the Peace and Conflict Studies Program at the University. He also started the Peace Garden project, which currently honors Gandhi, Martin Luther King Jr., Cesar E. Chavez, and Jane Addams.

In 1992 mayor Karen Humphrey appointed Kapoor to the Human Relations Commission of Fresno. He served twelve years, four as the chair. He was a founding director of the Fresno Center for Nonviolence. Since its inception in 1984 he has served on the Dr. Martin Luther King Jr. Unity Committee, City of Fresno. Kapoor also started and co-ordinated the "Stop the Hate, Build the Culture of Peace Week" in Fresno.

Nationally, Kapoor was co-executive editor of the journal Peace & Change. He co-chaired the Consortium on Peace Research, Education and Development (now the Peace and Justice Studies Association), which is centered at Georgetown University in Washington, D.C. This group sponsors an annual conference at various universities in Canada and the United States.

Kapoor also served on the Board of the former International Peace Research Association (per UNESCO).
