= Mahendra Nath Kapur =

M. N. Kapur
- Born: Mahendra Nath Kapur; December 10, 1910; Gujranwala, British India
- Died: March 30, 1994 (aged 83); Delhi
- Occupation: Education
- Known for: Principal, Modern School, New Delhi; Founder-principal, Gyan Bharati School

Mahendra Nath Kapur (December 1910 - March 1994) was an Indian educator, who served as principal of Modern School, New Delhi, for thirty years. For his contribution to the field of education, he received the Padma Shri, India's fourth highest civilian honour, in 1969.

== Early life ==
M. N. Kapur was born on 10 December 1910 in Gujranwala in Western Punjab, now in Pakistan. After a spell of home schooling, he completed his matriculation from American Mission School, Gujranwala. He studied at Government College, Lahore, where, apart from academics, he made a mark as a sportsman in association football, boxing and swimming. He obtained his Master's degree in physics in 1932.

== Career ==
Kapur started his career as a teacher in 1933, in Mayo College, Ajmer. In 1936, he went to the University of London for further training in education. In 1947, upon the retirement of Kamala Bose, the founder-principal of Modern School, the management instituted a search for her successor. M. N. Kapur was chosen despite his young age. Sardar Bhagwant Singh, a member of the management, had this to say: "On just going through the bio-data of the applicants we all thought to ourselves - the cheek of this young man to apply for the post of the Principal of Modern School! But when this young man walked into the room all of us were impressed with Mr Kapur's personality and bearing. ..." After the interviews, the selection committee "... had no hesitation in saying that Mr Kapur would be the best choice for the post ..."

Kapur took charge of Modern School in the turbulent times following the Independence of India and its Partition. He remained Principal for the next three decades, until his retirement in 1977. The Padma Shri was conferred on him in 1969.

In 1980, Gyan Bharati School was set up in Saket, New Delhi. Kapur contributed to its vision and took charge as its founder-Principal.

== Legacy ==
During Kapur's long tenure, Modern School came to be recognised as one of the leading schools of India. Personally, he was a mentor to many students at Modern and also at Gyan Bharati. The emphasis he laid on overall development of the personality, and not academic achievement alone, has endured. To celebrate his birth centenary, Modern School Old Students' Association organised a series of events in 2010-2011.

A documentary film, titled Dhruvtara (Pole Star), has been made on M. N. Kapur. The producer of the film is Abhinav Chaturvedi.
