= Pradipta Bhattacharya =

Film director and screenwriter

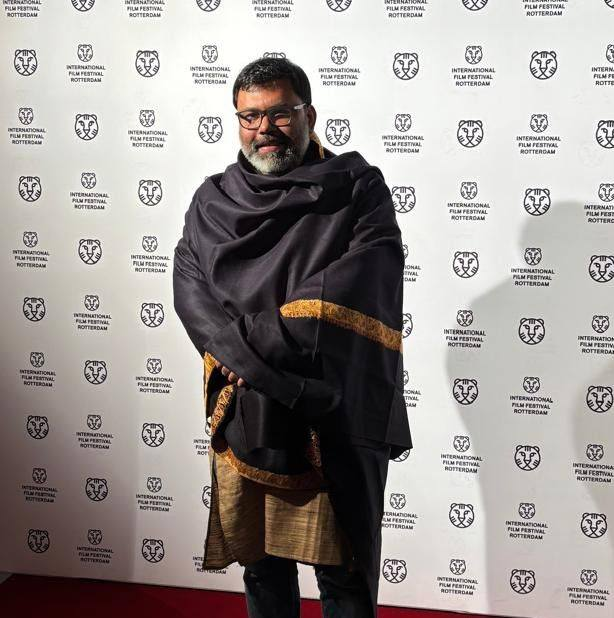
- Pradipta Bhattacharya
- Education: Roopkala Kendro
- Occupations: Film director; Screenwriter; Editor
- Awards: 1 National Film Awards

Pradipta Bhattacharya is a national award-winning acclaimed film maker and editor working in Bengali film industry. He is best known for his debut feature film, Bakita Byaktigato, which won the National Film Award for Best Bengali Film in 2013. His Nadharer bhela has gained a global recognition and being screened at the kolkata international film festival.

== Early life and education ==
Bhattacharyya was born in Berhampore, West Bengal. He attended J.N. Academy in his hometown before pursuing specialized training in film editing at Roopkala Kendro, Kolkata, graduating in 2004.

== Career ==
Bhattacharyya began his career in 2006 with the film You May Not Believe. His work is noted for its "quiet intensity" and deep roots in the socio-cultural fabric of Bengal . His first major success, Bakita Byaktigato (2013), a "mockumentary" exploring the nature of romance, gained significant critical acclaim. He followed this with Rajlokkhi o Srikanta in 2019, a modern adaptation of Sarat Chandra Chattopadhyay's classic novel. He made his web series debut with Birohi and the show had two consecutive seasons. His 2025 film, The Slowman and His Raft, again starring Amit Saha in the lead role had its world premiere at the International Film Festival of Rotterdam, and was also screened at Kolkata International Film Festival. Apart from film making pradipta bhattacharya is also a teacher at the Satyajit Ray Film and Television Institute.

== Awards and Recognition ==
- National Film Award (2013): Best Bengali Film for Bakita Byaktigato.
