= Saurav Bhadra =

Indian film director and screenwriter

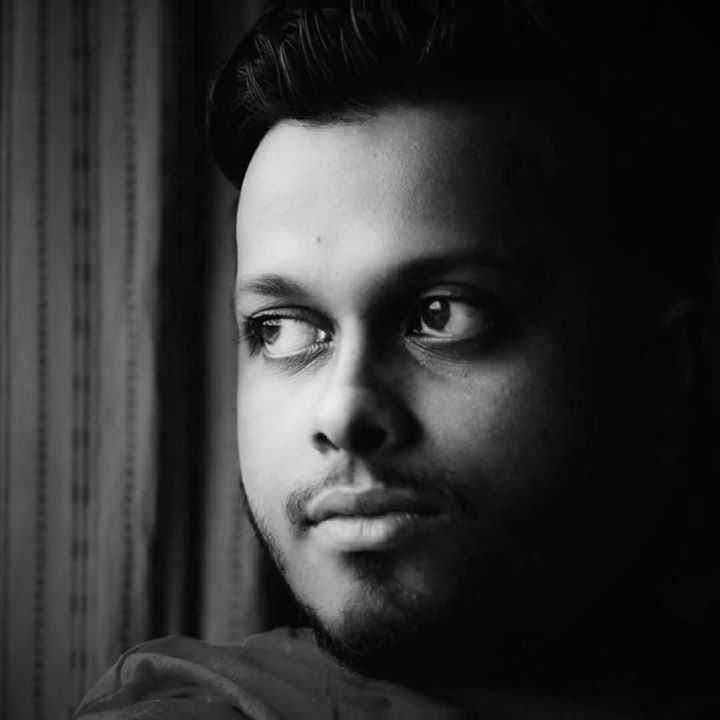
- Born: Siliguri, West Bengal, India
- Education: Roopkala Kendro; Jadavpur University
- Occupations: Film director; screenwriter; lyricist

Saurav Bhadra is an Indian film director, screenwriter and lyricist primarily active in the Bengali film Industry. He is best known for his documentary and short film work, including the critically acclaimed diploma film Bod Jaat (2019) and the documentary Faujdar - The Last Man Standing(2025), both premiered at the Kolkata International Film Festival. He has also earned a name as a popular lyricist of the super hit title song of the film Ami Sudhu Chyechi Tomay.

== Early life and education ==
Bhadra is a native of Siliguri, West Bengal. He pursued higher education in cinema, earning a Master's degree from Jadavpur University.

== Career ==
Saurav Bhadra started to work as an assistant director to popular film Director Srijit Mukherji on his film Mishawr Rawhoshyo. He then went on to write for television shows. Bhadra's directorial work often explores social themes, heritage, and human identity. His early short film, Bod Jaat (The Outcast), starring Amit Saha received global attention for its portrayal of the caste system and social disparity. His film got awarded at the NSU International Film Festival where the judges were the likes of Mostofa Sarwar Farooki. In 2025, his documentary Faujdar - The Last Man Standing was selected for the Indian Documentary Film competition category at the 31st Kolkata International Film Festival. The film documents the life of Shital Faujdar, an artisan from Bishnupur who is the last in an 87-generation lineage practising the art of Dashavatar cards. He is also a very well known lyricist and has made quit a name by writing the lyrics of the title track of the film Ami Sudhu Cheyechi Tomay starring Ankush Hazra and Subhashree Ganguly.His next short film, Garod set for festival release in 2026 starring Amit Saha and Korok Samanta.

== Filmography ==
Year	Film	Role	Format	Notes
2014	Ami Sudhu Cheyechy Tomay	Lyricist	Feature Film	
2019	Bod Jaat (The Outcast)	Director, Screenwriter	Short Film	
2020	Cataclysm	Director , Screen writer	Short Film	
2021	Pherry Ghat	Story Writer	Short Film	
2025	Faujdar - The Last Man Standing	Director, Narrator	Documentary	
