= Bod Jaat =

Indian Bengali-language thriller short film

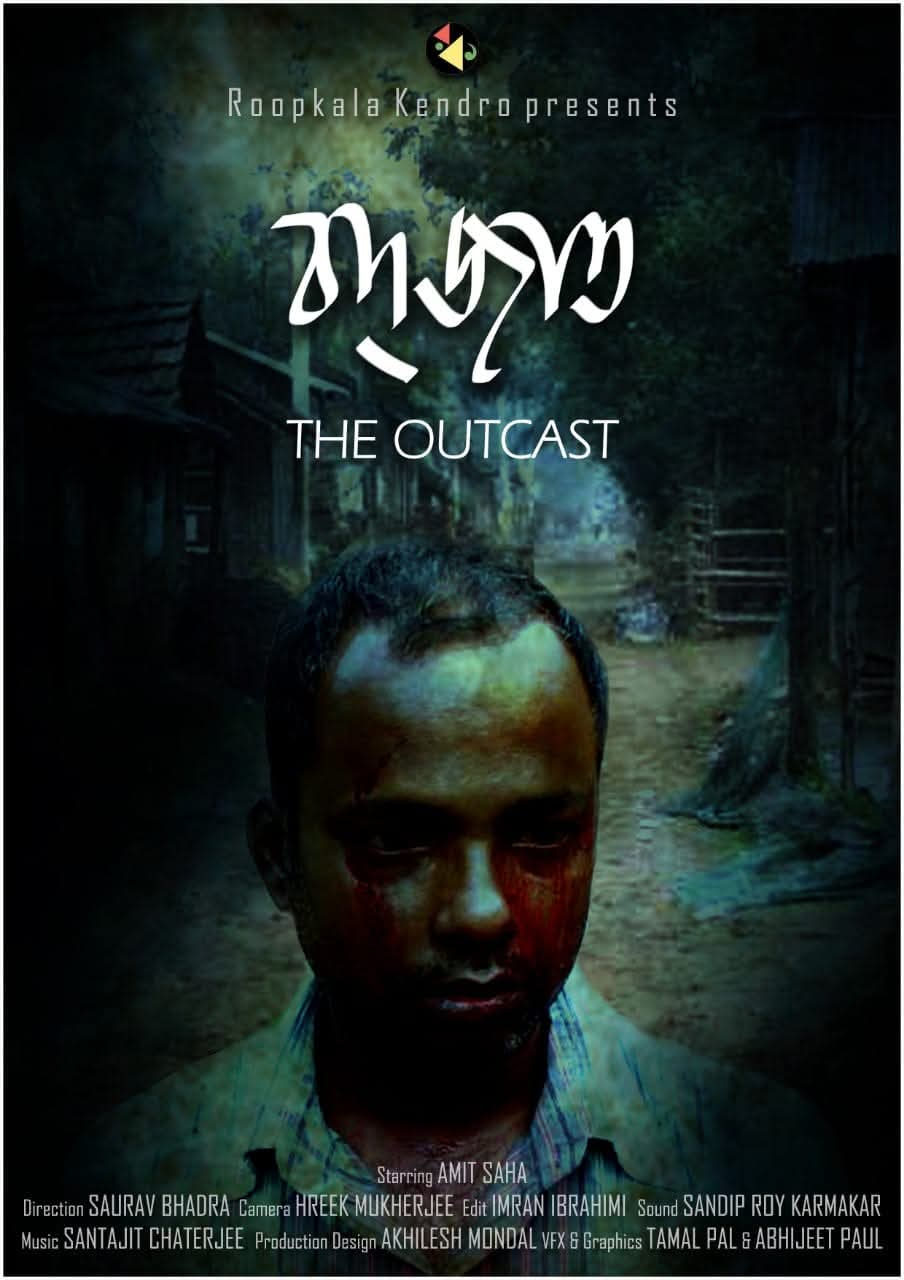
- Directed by: Saurav Bhadra
- Written by: Saurav Bhadra
- Produced by: Roopkala Kendro
- Starring: Amit Saha; Archishman Biswas
- Cinematography: Hreek Mukherjee
- Edited by: Imran Ibrahimi
- Release date: 2019
- Running time: 23 min
- Country: India
- Language: Bengali

Bod Jaat (The Outcast) is a 2019 Indian Bengali-language thriller short film directed by Saurav Bhadra. It premiered at the 25th Kolkata International Film Festival. It tells the story of a man from a minority section of a village facing intense fear, paranoia, and social unrest due to violent conflict, exploring themes of caste disparity and existential dread.

== Plot ==
A man who belongs to the minority section of a village is utterly disturbed, petrified, and depressed by the situation of terror that prevails around him and his family due to the violence between the majority and the minority section of the society. His fear makes him question his own identity and prognosticate the future that throws him and his family into a disturbing profusion of unanswered questions about their own existence. The story is about how he is drawn at the edge of his patience and angst where he faces his fate and how he poetically reciprocates.

== Production ==
The film was produced by Roopkala Kendro under the Information and Cultural Department, Government of West Bengal. Development of the screenplay began in 2018, focusing on authentic rural portrayal. The Cinemetography of the film was done by Hreek Mukherjee, the Editing was done by Imran Ibrahimi and the Sound was done by Sandip Roy Karmakar. The primary cast of the film was played by Amit Saha who has done significant role in films like Bakita Byaktigoto and Nadharer Bhela.

== Release ==
The film officially premiered on 8 November 2019 at the 25th Kolkata International Film Festival. It has also won the Best film at the NSU international Short Film Festival in Dhaka, Bangladesh and was accloded by Film Director Mostofa Sarwar Farooki who was one of the judge at the festival.

== See also ==
- 25th Kolkata International Film Festival
