= God on the Balcony =

- Directed by: Biswajeet Bora
- Written by: Biswajeet Bora
- Produced by: Noorul Sultan
- Starring: Harish Khanna; Pranami Bora; Porinandhi Jima Sultana
- Cinematography: Sitanshu Khamari
- Edited by: Biswajeet Bora
- Music by: Vishal Khatri
- Release date: 7 October 2020 (Kolkata)
- Running time: 89 minutes
- Country: India
- Language: Assamese

God on the Balcony (Balconit Bhogawan) is an Assamese film written and directed by Biswajeet Bora and produced by Maina Productions.

== Plot summary ==
In a far-off Assamese village, the movie is set. Farmer Khagen, his wife Numali, and their daughter Kuwali are central figures in the story. Unfortunately, Numali perishes after being fatally crushed by wild elephants. In the hospital, where Khagen transports her, she passes away. The narrative details his arduous efforts to ride his bicycle, while an ambulance was unavailable, to transport his wife's body from the hospital back to their home. The two reporters he encounters on his journey into the narrow streets carrying the body and his young daughter become embroiled in an entirely different conflict as a result.

== Cast ==
- Pranami Bora as Numali
- Suneet Bora as Pranav
- Binod Lal Das as MLA's Assistant
- Harish Khanna as Khagen
- Rajib Kro as Watchman
- Arun Hazarika as Minister
- Eva Mahanta as Jeena
- Porinandhi Jima Sultana as Kuwali

== Production ==
The movie is set in the Majuli district of Assam, where the infrastructure is appalling. With a genuine, flesh-and-blood approach, Harish Khanna gives Khagen Das more depth as a character. The movie stands out for its lengthy silences and few speeches. This explains why Harish's performance was so flawless. The lighting and cinematography in Khagen's home, where Numali prepares meals using an indigenous bottle topped with a lit cotton wick, contrasts sharply with the brightly lit and garishly colored frames of the Ras Mela, which are accompanied by traditional folk theatre, music, and dances. The transition between different settings, eras, and moods is skillfully done without jerks at any point in the editing. The music in this songless film is nearly entirely minimalist, focusing on a single thematic musical stroke that imbues the entire journey the father and daughter take with a lyrical tone of loss and sadness.

According to Bora, the movie is based on a newspaper article on an identical incident that happened in Odisha. He said, "I kept the news inside my heart for a long time because it disturbed me." Bora compared Odisha to the rural Assam where he had grown up.

== Awards ==
Year	Award	Category	Result	Recipient	Ref
2020	26th Kolkata International Film Festival	Best Director	Winner	Biswajeet Bora	
2021	12th Indian Film Festival of Melbourne	Best Director	Nominated	Biswajeet Bora	
2021	13th Bengaluru International Film Festival	Best Asian Film 2020	Winner	Biswajeet Bora	
2021	10th Washington DC South Asian Film Festival	Best Actor Male Feature Film	Winner	Harish Khanna	

== Reception ==
- There are some flaws in God on the Balcony. In the initial section of the story, where linearity is unnecessarily compromised, the editing is confused. The production clearly demonstrates the paucity of resources. It was vital to include some breathtaking sequences, particularly the one where Numali gets hurt. The cell phone that is meant to be inoperable is still ringing even though the two journalists fell into the river, lost their cameras, and struggled to exit the water.
- God on the Balcony, an Assamese movie that depicts government indifference, will be presented at international film festivals.
- The real-life tale of the impoverished Dana Majhi from Odisha, who was forced to carry the body of his wife on his shoulders for over ten kilometers because the government did not care, served as the basis for Biswajeet Bora's Assamese film God on the Balcony. The critically acclaimed picture was screened at the recently concluded Dhaka International Film Festival in January 2021 and earned Bora the Best Director Award in the Indian Language Films category at the 26th Kolkata International Film Festival. This month, it will be shown as a part of the Indian Cinema Now segment of the International Film Festival of Kerala, and later this year, in May, it will be shown at the Imagine India International Film Festival in Madrid, Spain.
