= 25th Kolkata International Film Festival =

2019 Indian film festival

- 25th Kolkata International Film Festival
- Opening film: Goopy Gyne Bagha Byne
- Location: Kolkata
- Founded: 1995
- No. of films: 214 full-length films 152 short films and documentaries
- Festival date: 8 Nov - 15 Nov 2019
- Language: International
- Website: kiff.in
- 26th 24th

The 25th Kolkata International Film Festival took place from 8 to 15 November 2019.

== Inauguration ==
Hosted by CM of West Bengal, Mamata Banerjee, The 25th Kolkata International Film Festival was Inaugurated by Amitabh Bachchan followed by a grand inaugural ceremony on Netaji Indoor Stadium. other guests included names like Shah Rukh khan, Jaya Bachchan, Mahesh Bhatt, Rakhee Gulzar etc. The ceremony was also graced by international film personalities like German filmmaker Volker Schlöndorff, Sex Lies and Videotape actress Andie MacDowell and Slovak film director Dušan Hanák

The Focus Country this year was Germany with 42 films.

== Official Selections ==
=== Competition Categories ===
==== Asian Select (NETPAC Award) ====
Title	Director	Notes	ref
Sraboner Dhara	Abhijit Guha, Sudeshna Roy		
Devi Aur Hero	Aditya Kripalani	NETPAC Award for Best Film	
Running To The Sky	Mirlan Abdykalykov		
Mystic Memoir	Aparajita Ghosh		
The End Will Be Spectacula	Ersin Celik		
Chandrabati Katha	N. Rashed Chowdhury		
Hava, Maryam, Ayesha	Sahraa Karimi		
Gitarista	Jason Orfalas		

==== Competition on Indian Documentary Films ====
Title	Director	Notes	ref
ELEPHANTS DO REMEMBER	Swati Pandey		
VISIONLESS	Sanjiban Nath		
THE DAY I BECAME A WOMAN	Moupia Mukherjee		
HOUSEFULL	AYAN CHAKRABORTI		
THE MOTHERLAND	Shibu Prusty		
JANANI'S JULIET	Pankaj Rishi Kumar		
IDIOM OF RUG	Dip Bhuyan		
PANI PAATA PORATAM	Aditi Maddali		
ITI	Nirabari Bandyopadhyay		
SONGS FROM THE VALLEY	ISHANI K DUTTA		
SWIMMING THROUGH THE DARKNESS	Supriyo Sen		
WASTE BAND	Supriyo Sen		
ABRIDGED	GAURAV PURI	Golden Royal Bengal Tiger Award for Best Indian Documentary Film	

==== Competition on Indian Language's Films ====
Title	Director	Notes	ref
VEYILMARANGAL	Dr.Biju		
RUN KALYANI	Geetha J	Special Jury Award	
MAI GHAT CRIME NO 103- 2005	ANANTH MAHADEVAN	'Hiralal Sen Memorial Award' for Best Film	
LIHAAF	Rahat Kazmi		
GANGODAKA	Shridhar Hegde		
KARUP	Deepesh T		
MOOSO	Deepankar Prakash		
ATLAS	VIKAS KALPANA DWIVEDI		
NIRBAN	Gautam Halder		
DUBURI	Krishnendu Dutta		
PARCEL	Indrasis Acharya	'Hiralal Sen Memorial Award' Award for Best Director	
NAMEPLATE	Preet		
DARK LIGHT	Mayur Hardas		
RAMAI	Bal Bargale		

==== Competition on Indian Short Films ====
Title	Director	Notes	ref
MADHUBANI	Emraanakbar Enamdar		
JONAKI	Abhisek Ronnie Chakraborty		
SEKOOL	Stenzin Tankong		
MRUGAJAL	Onkar Diwadkar		
SWAPNOGACHH - DREAM TREE	Subhas Ghosh, Subhasish Christche		
BOD JAAT	Saurav Bhadra		
PARESHAN GULLY KA BHAGWAN SIKANDAR	Ishan Sharma		
SISYPHUS	Syed Aniruddha Kabir, Aneek Pilsima		
FORWARD	Kshitija Khandagale		
TIMELESS FLUX	Srisha Chakraborti		
PANDIT USMAN	Akram Hassan		
PATHAROSA	Hariharasudhan K		
FURNITURE	Nazmus Sakib Himel		
KRANTODORSHI	RITUPARNA DASDATTA		
KAYANTAR	Rajdeep Paul, Sarmistha Maiti		
UTHARAKADALASSU	Indu VR		
ONIBARJO	Sudipto Shankar Roy		
NADI	Nitin Prakash Pednekar		
CHAKRABYUHA	Suryoday De		
NISHCHIT- ANISHCHIT	siddharth panwar		
SUMMER RHAPSODY	Shravan Katikaneni	Golden Royal Bengal Tiger Award for Best Indian Short Film	

==== International Competition ====
Title	Director	Notes	ref
CAT STICKS	Ronny Sen		
SUD YOD	Ashima Aiyer		
OMAR VE BIZ	MARYNA ER GORBACH		
LA IMAGEN DEL TIEMPO	Jeissy Trompiz		
Women Run With The Wolves	Amir Athar Soheili		
Lunana: A Yak in the Classroom	Pawo Choyning Dorji		
SHPIA E AGES	Lendita Zeqiraj	Special Jury Award	
ISTORIA LIZY	Alexander Zhovna		
MYSLENNIY VOLK	Valeriya Gai Germanika		
KIRSCHBLUETEN & DAEMONEN	Doris Doerrie		
One Man Dies a Million Times	Jessica Oreck		
THE PAINTED BIRD	Vaclav Marhoul	Golden Royal Bengal Tiger Award for Best Director	
LA LLORONA	Jayro Bustamante	Golden Royal Bengal Tiger Award for Best Film	
MAADATHY	Leena Manimekalai		
MINDANAO	Brillante Ma. Mendoza		

=== Non-Competition Categories ===
==== 50 years Celebration-RESTORED CLASSICS ====
Title	Director	Notes	ref
GOOPY GYNE BAGHA BYNE	Satyajit Ray		
BUTCH CASSIDY AND THE SUNDANCE KID	George Roy Hill		
MIDNIGHT COWBOY	John Schlesinger		
EASY RIDER	Dennis Hopper		
THE WILD BUNCH	Sam Peckinpah		
TRUE GRIT	Henry Hathaway		
TOPAZ	Alfred Hitchcock		
THE ITALIAN JOB	Peter Collinson		

==== Alexander Kluge (Focus: Germany) ====
Title	Director	Notes	ref
Yesterday Girl	Alexander Kluge		
The Power of Emotion	Alexander Kluge		
The Assault of the Present on the Rest of Time	Alexander Kluge		
Germany in Autumn	Volker Schlöndorff, Alexander Kluge, Rainer Werner Fassbinder, Alf Brustellin, Hans Peter Cloos, Maximiliane Mainka, Edgar Reitz, Katja Rupé, Bernhard Sinkel		
Circus Comes to the City	Alexander Kluge		
Artist in the Room	Alexander Kluge		
On the Knife's Edge	Alexander Kluge		
Happy Lamento	Alexander Kluge		

==== Bengali Panorama ====
Title	Director	Notes	ref
BORUNBABUR BONDHU	ANIK DATTA		
BAKI ITIHAS	Tushar Ballov		
TOBUO NANDINI	Subrata Sen		
MONALISA	Satyajit Dutta		
PRAAN	Sankar Debnath		
DIN RATRIR GOLPO	Prosenjit choudhury		

==== Cinema International ====
Title	Director	Notes	ref
A Son	Mehdi Barsaoui		
Synonyms	Nadav Lapid		
BACURAU	JULIANO DORNELLES, Kleber Mendonca Filho		
Beanpole	KANTEMIR BALAGOV		
WHITE LIE	Yonah Lewis, Calvin Thomas		
CAT IN THE WALL	Vesela Kazakova, Mina Mileva		
SIBYL	Justine Triet		
Battered Husband	Ralston Gonzales Jover		
PARWARESHGAH	Shahrbanoo Sadat		
LES MISERABLES	Ladj Ly		
AN EASY GIRL	Rebecca Zlotowski		
ENDE DER SAISON	Elmar Imanov		
SYSTEMSPRENGER	Nora Fingscheidt		
LIU YU TIAN	Feng Zu		
DERE E HAPUR	Florenc Papas		
LIBERTE	Albert Serra		
ADAM	Maryam Touzani		
PELIKANBLUT	Katrin Gebbe		
VERDICT	Raymund Ribay Gutierrez		
INSTINCT	Halina Reijn		
RESIN	Daniel Joseph Borgman		
GUERILLA	Gyorgy Mor Karpati		
POLSESTRA	Damjan Kozole		
LINA DE LIMA	Maria Paz Gonzalez		
UN DIVAN A TUNIS	Manele Labidi		
ROAM ROME MEIN	Tannishtha Chatterjee		
ALPHA	Nasir Uddin Yousuff		
PERDRIX	Erwan Le Duc		
CANCION SIN NOMBRE	Melina León		

== Winners ==
Golden Royal Bengal Tiger Award for Best Film : LA LLORONA - Jayro Bustamante

Golden Royal Bengal Tiger Award for Best Director : THE PAINTED BIRD - Vaclav Marhoul

'Hiralal Sen Memorial Award' for Best Film : MAI GHAT CRIME NO 103- 2005 - ANANTH MAHADEVAN

'Hiralal Sen Memorial Award' Award for Best Director : Parcel - Indrasis Acharya

NETPAC Award for Best Film : Devi Aur Hero - Aditya Kripalani Golden Royal Bengal Tiger Award for Best Indian Documentary Film : ABRIDGED - Gaurav Puri

Golden Royal Bengal Tiger Award for Best Indian Short Film : SUMMER RHAPSODY - Shravan Katikaneni
