= Harish Khanna (actor) =

Indian actor and theatre personality

- Born: Kota, Rajasthan, India
- Occupation: Actor
- Years active: 1995 to present

Harish Khanna is an Indian actor who appears mainly in Indian and foreign language films. He is best known for his performances in Yahaan, Kaminey, Midnight’s Children, and Gangs of Wasseypur.

== Early life and education ==
Khanna was born in Kota, Rajasthan. He completed his junior school from Delhi and high school from Luthra Academy and Model School (MIER), Jammu. Thereafter he went on to pursue his graduation in acting from National School of Drama, New Delhi. On completion of his graduation in 1993, he moved to Mumbai and started working as an actor in both theatre and films together. He received the Charles Wales India Trust Award in the year 1999–2000 to pursue his studies in the UK at Central School of Speech & Drama, London, where he completed a certificate course in MA Performance Studies and Voice Studies.

== Theatre career ==
Khanna started working in theatre as an actor with Natrang in Jammu and Kashmir. He has travelled widely with his performances to countries including Germany, Japan, and Brazil. Some of his performances were Hooriya directed by Anamika Haksar (1997); Sundari: An Actor Prepares and Makeup (2002) by Anuradha Kapur (1998); Odysseus in A Ramayan Odyssey by Jatinder Verma of Tara Arts, London; No Boat in Sight by Makoto Sato and Anuradha Kapur (2002); The Antigone Project by Ein Lall and Anuradha Kapur (2003). He received acclaim for his performance in Glass House Project where he spent 15 days in a glass house. It was an initiative by National School of Drama for 10th Bharat Rang Mahotsava. He directed the Garbage Project which was showcased in 13th Bharat Rang Mahotsava (International Theatre Festival) organised by National School of Drama in 2011. Another project is Surviving Survival Vienna Wiener Festwochen 2011. Khanna has conducted several workshops on voice, speech and acting in India and abroad. Among the cities he has worked in are Jammu, Srinagar, Mandi, Chandigarh, Guwahati, Pune, and Delhi in India; and Daegu and Tokyo in South Korea and Japan respectively. He is also a visiting faculty at the National School of Drama and Department of Indian Theatre, Panjab University. Khanna was also involved in theatre therapy programs initiated by the Rajiv Gandhi Foundation in Jammu and Kashmir for three years.

== Acting career ==
Khanna made his silver screen acting debut with Memories of Fear directed by Madhusree Dutta in 1995. He went on to work with directors like Govind Nihalani, Milan Luthria, Shoojit Sircar, Vishal Bhardwaj, Anurag Kashyap and Tigmanshu Dhulia. Some of his notable performances came with films like Sanshodhan (1996), Hazaar Chaurasi Ki Maa (1998), Kachhe Dhaage (1999), Charas (2004), Yahaan (2005), Kaminey (2009), 7 Khoon Maaf (2011) and Gangs of Wasseypur (2012). Anurag Kashyap gave him special mention at the beginning of Gangs of Wasseypur 2 for his outstanding performance in Gangs of Wasseypur. After his performances in films like 7 Khoon Maaf, Gangs of Wasseypur and Haraamkhor, he became a cult actor of India. He was seen in Netflix original film Rajma Chawal, directed by Leena Yadav, and received applaud for his performance in Bollywood film Sonchiriya directed by Abhishek Chaubey. Apart from Bollywood ventures has worked in British-Swedish film Trishna directed by Michael Winterbottom. Apart from films, Khanna appears in commercials regularly. Some of his notable commercials are paytm "Khushiyo ko Recharge Karo!" and "Friends Adult Diaper-Mother's Day".

== Personal life ==
Khanna belongs to a middle-class family hailing from Jammu. His parents migrated from Lahore to Delhi and lived in different cities before they finally settled in Jammu during early 1980s. He has one brother and one sister. Being a nature lover, he loves to travel to the mountains and interacting with people. He is fluent in Hindi, Urdu, Punjabi and English.

== Filmography ==
Year	Films	Language	Character	Director
1995	Memories of Fear	Hindi	Example	Madhusree Dutta
1996	Sanshodhan	Hindi	Hariya	Govind Nihalani
1998	Hazaar Chaurasi Ki Maa	Hindi	Jyoti	Govind Nihalani
1999	Kachche Dhaage	Hindi	Mustafa	Milan Luthria
2000	Scribbles On Akka	Hindi		Madhusree Dutta
2004	Charas: A Joint Effort	Hindi	Hero	Tigmanshu Dhulia
2005	Yahaan	Hindi	Majid	Shoojit Sircar
2006	7 Islands and a Metro	Hindi	Sadat Hasan Manto	Madhusree Dutta
2009	Kaminey	Hindi	Afghani	Vishal Bhardwaj
2011	7 Khoon Maaf	Hindi	Ghalib	Vishal Bhardwaj
2011	Trishna	Hindi/English	Vijay	Michael Winterbottom
2012	Gangs of Wasseypur	Hindi	Yadav Ji	Anurag Kashyap
2012	Midnight's Children	Hindi	Joe D'Costa	Deepa Mehta
2014	Words with Gods	English	Iqbal-Segment "God Room"	Mira Nair
2015	Haraamkhor	Hindi	Raghuvir	Shlok Sharma
2015	Rani Padmini	Hindi	Raja	Aashiq Abu
2015	Bodhi (Short)	Hindi	Example	Supreet K Singh
2015	Bouddi: The Sister-In-Law (Short)	Hindi	Example	Supreer K Singh
2018	The Wedding Guest	Hindi	Nitin (as Harish Khanna)	Michael Winterbottom
2018	Tumbbad	Hindi	Raja-Samsthanik	Rahi Anil Barve, Anil Gandhi
2018	Rajma Chawal	Hindi	Kuljeet Singh Ahluwalia	Leena Yadav
2019	Sonchiriya	Hindi	Kok Singh	Abhishek Chaubey
2019	Moothon	Hindi; Malayalam	Karim	Geethu Mohandas
2020	God on the Balcony	Assamese	Khagen	Biswajeet Bora
2021	Maharani (2021 TV series)	Hindi	Shanker Mehto	
2023	12th Fail	Hindi	Ramveer sharma	Vidhu Vinod Chopra
2024	A Game of Two Halves	English	Kadeem	Khayam Khan
2024	Barah by Barah	Hindi	Parbat	Gaurav Madan

IFFM – God on the balcony
2021 Best Performance Male – Khagen
