= Coke Studio @ MTV season 4 =

Season of television series

Coke Studio @ MTV
- Season 4
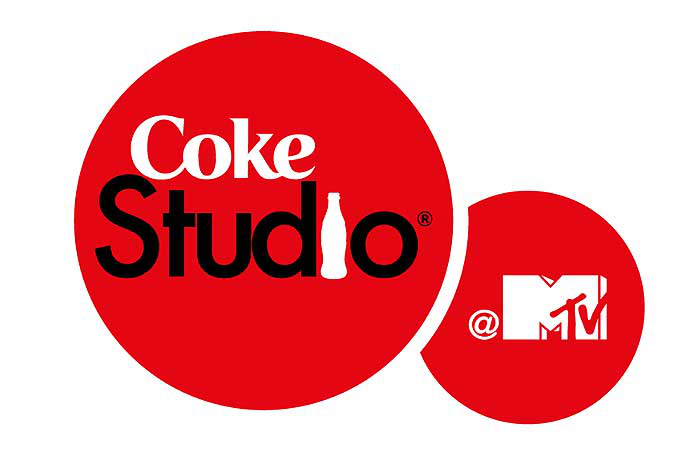
- Starring: Vocalists
- No. of episodes: 6

Release
- Original network: MTV India; YouTube
- Original release: March 1 – October 4, 2015

Season chronology
- ← Previous; Season 3

The fourth season of the Indian music television series, Coke Studio @ MTV, aired from 1 March 2015, to 4 October 2015. Following the format of previous seasons, the season featured original compositions created and produced by various music composers. It consisted of six episodes and presented a total of 17 songs.

== Artists ==
=== Vocalists ===
- Amit Trivedi
- Anupam Roy
- Babul Supriyo
- Bhanvari Devi
- Bhungarkhan Manganiar
- Bobkat
- Dhruv Ghanekar
- Diljit Dosanjh
- Divya Kumar
- Gurdas Maan
- Harshdeep Kaur
- Ila Arun
- Jashan Singh
- Jasmine Sandlas
- Jatinder Shah
- Jeet Gannguli
- Jyoti Nooran
- Kalpana Patowary
- Kirtidan Gadhvi
- Krishna Kumar Buddha Ram
- Manj Musik
- Master Saleem
- Raftaar
- Raj Pandit
- Rajesh Radhakrishnan
- Ram Sampath
- Rekha Bhardwaj
- Rituraj Mohanty
- Sachin–Jigar
- Salim Merchant
- Satyaki Banerjee
- Shadab Faridi
- Sharmilee Supriyo
- Sona Mohapatra
- Sonia Saigal
- Sukhwinder Singh
- Sunny Brown
- Taniskha Sanghvi
- Tochi Raina
- Tony Sebastian
- Vidya Harikrishna
- Viveick Rajgopalan

== Production ==
The season was led by Creative Director Jagjit Singh. Pratik Gupta served as the Behind-the-Music Director. The production team consisted of Producers Pradeep Giri and Shashwat Singh. Parichit Paralkar served as Art Director, with Sita Ram Mistry as his Assistant Art Director. Zee Music Company was the official music partner for the season.

The season followed the format established in previous years. Multiple music composers created and produced original compositions for the show. The music producers for this season included (listed alphabetically):

- Amit Trivedi
- Anupam Roy
- Dhruv Ghanekar
- Jatinder Shah
- Jeet Gannguli
- Manj Musik
- Ram Sampath
- Sachin–Jigar
- Salim–Sulaiman
- Sunny Brown
- Pradeep Giri

== Episodes ==
No. overall	No. in season	Song Title	Singer(s)	Lyricist(s)	Language(s)	Original release date
Produced & composed by Amit Trivedi
26	1	"Teriyaan Tu Jaane"	Amit Trivedi, Harshdeep Kaur & Jyoti Nooran	Irshad Kamil	Hindi & Punjabi	March 1, 2015
Produced & composed by Sachin – Jigar
27	2	"Laadki"	Kirtidan Gadhvi, Rekha Bhardwaj & Taniskha Sanghvi	Gujarati Folk & Priya Saraiya	Hindi & Gujarati	April 12, 2015
27	2	"Sawan Mein"	Divya Kumar & Jasmine Sandlas	Mayur Puri	Braj & Hindi	April 12, 2015
27	2	"Bannado"	Bhungarkhan Manganiar & Tochi Raina	Rajasthani Folk & Priya Suraiya	Hindi & Marwari	April 12, 2015
Produced & composed by Dhruv Ghanekar
28	3	"Nimoli"	Bobkat & Ila Arun	Bobkat & Ila Arun	English & Rajasthani	June 7, 2015
28	3	"Ae Rab"	Dhruv Ghanekar & Master Saleem	Bulleh Shah & Ishitta Arun	Hindi & Punjabi	June 7, 2015
28	3	"Birha"	Dhruv Ghanekar, Kalpana Patowary & Sonia Saigal	Kalpana Patowary, Sonia Saigal & Dhruv Ghanekar	Bhojpuri & English	June 7, 2015
Produced & composed by Ram Sampath
29	4	"Rangabati"	Sona Mohapatra, Rituraj Mohanty & Dopeadelicz	Odisha Folk, Mitrabhanu Guintia & Dopeadelicz	Odia & Tamil	July 5, 2015
29	4	"Chadh Chadha Jana"	Bhanvari Devi & Krishna Kumar Buddha Ram	Rajasthani Folk & Munna Dhiman	Hindi & Rajasthani	July 5, 2015
29	4	"Anhad Naad"	Sona Mohapatra & Shadaab Faridi	Munna Dhiman	Braj & Hindi	July 5, 2015
29	4	"Bharatiyar Trap Rap"	Vidya Harikrishna, Tony Sebastian, Rajesh Radhakrishnan & Viveick Rajgopalan	Bharatiyar, Rajesh Radhakrishnan & Viveick Rajgopalan	Carnatic & Tamil	July 5, 2015
Produced & composed by Jatinder Shah, Salim–Sulaiman, Manj Musik and Sunny Brown
30	5	"Ki Banu Duniya Da"	Diljit Dosanjh, Gurdas Maan & Jatinder Shah	Gurdas Maan	Punjabi	August 15, 2015
30	5	"Peer Manaawan Challiyaan"	Salim Merchant, Sukhwinder Singh & Raj Pandit	Sukhwinder Singh	Punjabi	August 15, 2015
30	5	"Allah Veh"	Jashan Singh, Manj Musik & Raftaar	Big Dhillon & Raftaar	Hindi & Punjabi	August 15, 2015
Produced & composed by Anupam Roy & Jeet Gannguli
31	6	"I Wanna Fly"	Anupam Roy, Sharmilee Supriyo & Babul Supriyo	Anupam Roy, Babul Supriyo & Javed Akhtar	Hindi & English	October 4, 2015
31	6	"Moner Manush"	Anupam Roy, Satyaki Banerjee, Babul Supriyo	Lalon Fakir & Anupam Roy	Bengali & Hindi	October 4, 2015
31	6	"Jhelum Naina"	Jeet Gannguli & Babul Supriyo	Prasoon Joshi	Hindi	October 4, 2015

== Reception ==
In a press release, Coke Studio revealed that the fourth season would feature 12 episodes, each 30 minutes long. However, only 6 episodes were released, and the show ended abruptly in October 2015. It was also the final season of Coke Studio @ MTV.
