= Faujdar - The Last Man Standing =

Faujdar- The last Man Standing
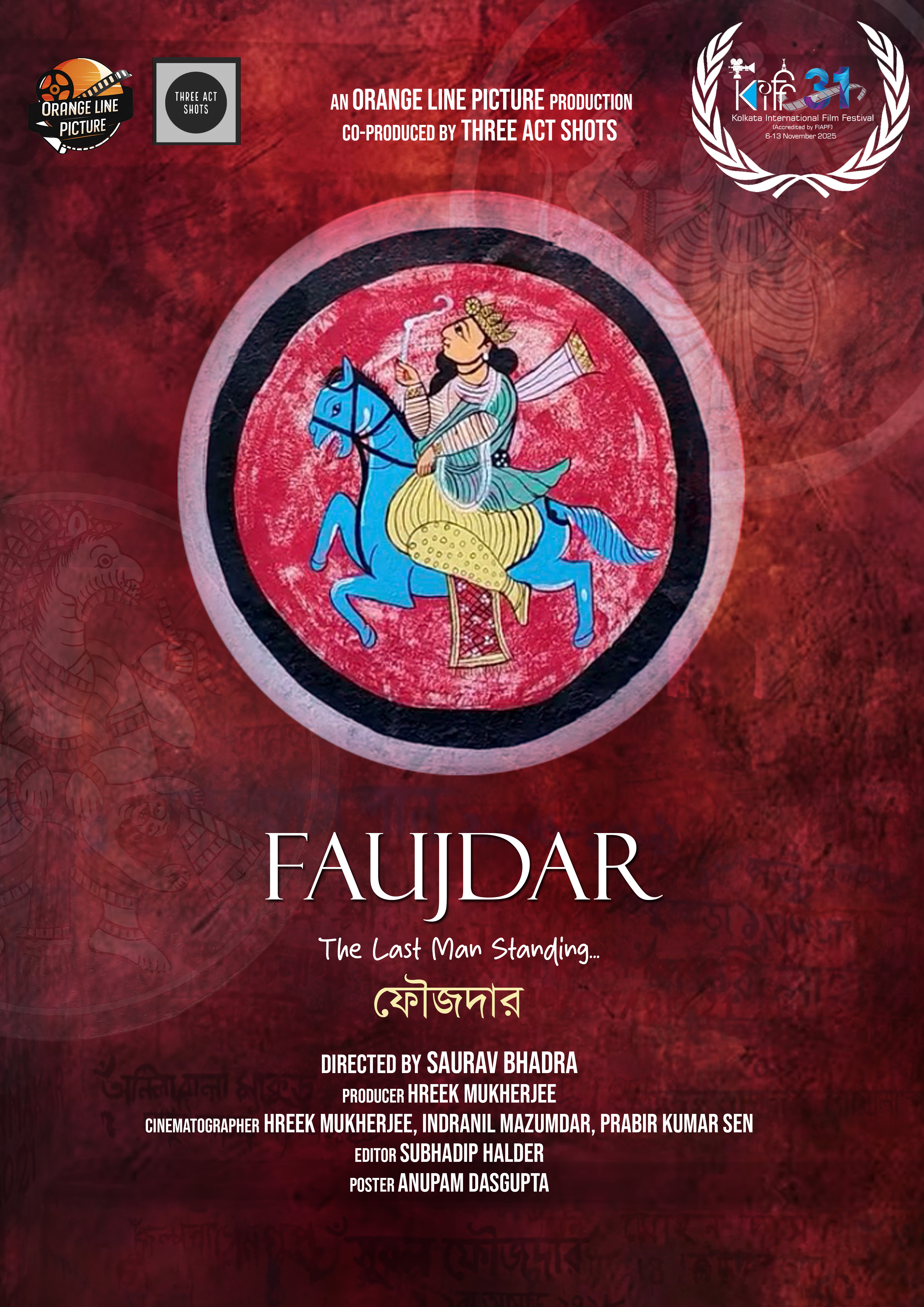
- Directed by: Saurav Bhadra
- Produced by: Hreek Mukherjee
- Edited by: Subhadip Halder
- Production company: OLP Studios
- Distributed by: Three Act Shots
- Release date: 9 November 2025
- Running time: 19 min.
- Country: India
- Language: Bengali

Faujdar- The Last Man Standing is a 2025 Bengali-language Indian documentary short film directed by Saurav Bhadra.The film had its Premier at the 31st Kolkata International Film Festival. The film highlights the life of Shital Faujdar, the last surviving artisan in Bishnupur, West Bengal, who practices the 1200-year-old traditional craft of making Dashavatar playing cards.

== Plot synopsis ==
The documentary chronicles the struggle of Shital Faujdar, who represents the 87th generation of his family dedicated to creating handcrafted Dashavatar cards—a traditional card game based on the ten incarnations of Lord Vishnu. As modern, machine-made alternatives become dominant, Shital struggles to keep this ancient artistic heritage alive. The film serves as a portrait of cultural resilience, documenting the traditional, painstaking techniques utilized to produce these circular, hand-painted cards.

== Production ==
The production of Faujdar- The Last Man Standing began after Director Saurav Bhadra discovered the nearly forgotten art of Dashavatar Tash during a visit to Bishnupur, West Bengal. Saurav started making the film since 2021 when he came to know about Shital Faujdar during a short visit to Bishnupur. Moved by the story of 51-year-old Shital Faujdar, who represents the 87th generation of his family dedicated to this craft, Bhadra sought to document the artisan’s "lonely battle" against the disappearance of this traditional folk art. The project was brought to life by a team of alumni from Roopkala Kendro, with Hreek Mukherjee serving as both the producer and one of the cinematographers. The documentary focuses on the artisan as a "symbol of resistance," notably concluding with a rendition of the resistance song "Bella Ciao" to pay tribute to his resilience. The film is produced by OLP studios and Three Act Shots.

== Release ==
Faujdar- The Last Man Standing had its premiere at the 31st Kolkata International Film Festival in November 2025. It was scheduled for screening at Nandan 3 on November 9, 2025, and Shishir Mancha on November 13, 2025.

== Reception ==
The film has been recognized for its focus on documenting vanishing Indian folk arts and its selection at the Kolkata International Film Festival (KIFF).
