= 26th Kolkata International Film Festival =

Annual film festival held in Kolkata, West Bengal, India

- Location: Kolkata
- Founded: 1995
- Festival date: 8–15 January 2021
- Language: International
- Website: kiff.in

Kolkata International Film Festival chronology
- 27th 25th

The 26th Kolkata International Film Festival took place from 8 to 15 January 2021. It was scheduled to take place from 5 to 12 November 2020 but was postponed to January 2021 due to COVID-19 pandemic in India.

== Inauguration ==
The 26th Kolkata International film festival was virtually inaugurated by CM of West Bengal Mamata Banerjee on 8 January 2020. Shah Rukh Khan, who is the brand ambassador of Bengal, joined the ceremony over a video call. Since 2011, Shah Rukh Khan has been attending the film festival each year.

Around 132 feature films, documentaries and short films have been selected to be showcased at the KIFF 2021 out of 1170 submissions. The festival commenced with actor Soumitra Chatterjee's world-renowned film Apur Sansar.

== Tributes ==
The Festival Paid Tribute to Late Legendary Actor Shri Soumitra Chatterjee, Federico Fellini, Éric Rohmer, Ravi Shankar, Fernando Solanas, Kim Ki-duk, Basu Chatterjee, Rishi Kapoor, Irrfan Khan, Tapas Paul, Amala Shankar, Hemanta Mukhopadhyay, Bhanu Bandopdhyay & Santu Mukhopadhyay.

== Official Selection ==
=== Competition Categories ===
==== Asian Select (NETPAC Award) ====
Title	Director	Notes
Priyo Chinar Pata, Iti Segun	KUMAR CHOWDHURY	
Drowsy City	LUONG DINH DUNG	
Between One Shore And Several Others	sreekrishnan kp	
Not Today	Aditya Kripalani	
Mahanagar / One Night In Kathmandu	Mohan Rai	
NONAJOLER KABBO	Rezwan Shahriar Sumit	NETPAC Award for Best Film

==== Competition on Indian Language's Films ====
Title	Director	Notes
LAILA AUR SATT GEET	Pushpendra Singh	
BELCONY T BHOGAWAN	BISWAJEET BORA	Best Director
PINKI ELLI?	Prithvi Konanur	
KOSA	Mohit Priyadarshi	
AVIJATRIK	Subhrajit Mitra	
ORANGU MARANGALUDE VEEDU	Dr Bijukumar Damodaran	
KALLA NOTTAM	Rahul Riji Nair	Best Film
MOHANDAS	P Sheshadri	
TRIPLE WHAMMY	Anish Chacko	
BITTERSWEET	Ananth Narayan Mahadevan	

==== International Competition: Innovation in Moving Images ====
Title	Director	Notes
SHAMBALA	Artykpai Suiundukov	Golden Royal Bengal Tiger Award for Best Director
Going Blind	Haci Orman	
AQUARIUM	Deepesh T	
GHOST IMAGE	Sang Jun Lee	
The Presumption Of Guilt	Oleg Asadulin	
Blindfold	Taras Dron	Special Jury Mention
Snails Club	Michele Senesi	
THE WAY TO PARADISE	Wahid Sanouji	
BANDAR BAND	Manijeh Hekmat	Golden Royal Bengal Tiger Award for Best Film

==== Competition on Indian Documentary Films ====
Title	Director	Notes
On The Brink - Season 2 - Bats	Akanksha Sood Singh	
Highways Of Life	Amar Maibam	Best Indian Documentary Film
The Museum Man	Sabyasachi Banerji	
Niranjan Pradhan - Journey Of A Sculptor	Anjan Bose	
Advidiya	Anubhab Ganguly, Sourasis Bose	
Who Says The Lepchas Are Vanishing	Abhyuday Khaitan	
My Brother Alpha	Shantanu Mondal, Rani Bed Banshi	
Bhobo Nodir Pare	Nikhilesh Mattoo	
Chera Tamshuk	Suvarthi Mohanti	
Dancing With Nature	Malay Dasgupta	

==== Competition on Indian Short Films ====
Title	Director	Notes
Welcome Uncle	Sandipan Bhattacharya	
Khisa	Raj Pritam More	
Naked Voice	Deepankar Prakash	
Virus	Anindya Bose	
Beyond Hope	Rohit Kumar	
An Odyssey Of Gayatri	Abhra Chakraborty	
Nothing Happened	Himanshu Mishro Mondal	
Jaltarang	Jhimli Roy	
Resurgence	Sreemon Das	
Sudurabhase	Nilanjan Karmakar	
Balai	Suvobrata Roy Chowdhury, Arpita Chatterjee	
Binimoy	Tanvi Chowdhary	
Salana Jalsa	Pratik Thakare	
Chicken Tehari	Nasrina Khan	
Newborn Poetry	L.Priyanka	
Nspect ANT	Suman Paul	
Still Alive	Onkar Diwadkar	
Get Up And Rise	Samik Roy Choudhury	
Your Kunti	Rajat Roy, Arunava Mukherjee	
Dusk	Ujjal Paul	Best Indian Short Film

=== Non-Competition Categories ===
==== Bengali Panorama ====
Title	Director	Notes
SAHOBASHE	Anjan Kanjilal	
PUNGLINGO STRILINGO	Subrata Sen	
MICHHIL	SURAJIT NAG, UJJWAL BASU	
BISH	Jyotishman Chattopadhyay	
DAAYE	Jyotirmay Deb	
SUNYO	Shankha Ghosh	
TITLI	Bishikh Talukdar	
BEAUTIFUL LIFE	Raju Debnath	

==== Cinema International ====
Title	Director	Notes
Genus Pan	Lav Diaz	
Thou Shalt Not Hate	Mauro Mancini	
Miss Marx	Susanna Nicchiarelli	
In Between Dying	Hilal Baydarov	
LAILA IN HAIFA	Amos Gitai	
Charlatan	Agnieszka Holland	
There Is No Evil	Mohammad Rasoulof	
Dear Comrades	Andrei Sergeyevich Mikhalkov Konchalovsky	
True Mothers	Naomi Kawase	
Summer Of 85	Francois Ozon	
High Ground	Stephen Maxwell Johnson	
Nadia, Butterfly	Pascal Plante	
THE MAN WHO SOLD HIS SKIN	Kaouther Ben Hania	
Oskar & Lilli	ARASH T. RIAHI	
Rival	Marcus Lenz	
THE TIES	Daniele Luchetti	

==== Short & Documentary Panorama ====
Title	Director	Notes
HOLY RIGHTS	Farha khatun	
GRACE	Smarak Samarjeet	
BOUND BY US	Chinmoy Sonowal	
WE THE BROKEN COGS IN THE MACHINE	Sonatan Karmakar	
KOLKATA DAIRY	Zhangna	
ECO FRIENDLY GANGASAGAR MELA	Shila Datta	
ANONYMOUS	Mithunchandra Chaudhari	
THE ROOFTOP - THE STORY OF A PSYCHIATRIST AND A RAPED GIRL	Avirup Biswas	
MY UNBLOOD BROTHER	Iqbaal Rizzvi	
LACHHKA DANGIR KATHA	BUDDHADEB BARMAN	
LAPTOP: A LOCKDOWN FILM	PREMENDU BIKASH CHAKI	
ARTIST	Tony James	
CHITTOKHOV	Soumajit Das	
JANAIKA	Samya Mandal	
KARBALA KATHA	Sourav Sarangi	
CHAK CHAGE IMA	JENISH SALAM	
COLDFIRE	Riddhi Sen	

==== Special Screening ====
Title	Director	Notes
Swimming Out Till The Sea Turns Blue	Jia Zhang Ke	
LAALI	Abhiroop Basu	
MEE RAQSAM	Baba Azmi	

==== Special Tributes ====
Person	Title	Director
Amala Shankar	KALPANA	Uday Shankar
Basu Chatterjee	CHHOTI SI BAAT	Basu Chatterjee
Farnando Solanas	SUR	Farnando Solanas
Irrfan Khan	Paan SIngh Tomar	Tigmanshu Dhulia
Kim Ki Duk	Spring, Summer, Fall, Winter... And Spring	Kim Ki Duk
Rishi Kapoor	MULK	Anubhav Sinha
Santu Mukhopadhyay	Autumn Bird	Urmi Chakraborty
Soumitra Chattopadhyay	Dekha	Gautam Ghose
Soumitra Chattopadhyay	GANADEVATA	Tarun Majumdar
Soumitra Chattopadhyay	WHEEL CHAIR	Tapan Sinha
Soumitra Chattopadhyay	Up In The Clouds	Mrinal Sen
Soumitra Chattopadhyay	The World Of Apu	Satyajit Ray
Soumitra Chattopadhyay	MAYURAKSHI	Atanu Ghosh
Soumitra Chattopadhyay	Kony	Saroj De
Soumitra Chattopadhyay	Footsteps	Suman Ghosh
Soumitra Chattopadhyay	BOHOMAAN	Anumita Dasgupta
Tapas Pal	DADAR KIRTI	Tarun Majumdar
Tapas Pal	8:08 ER BONGAON LOCAL	Debaditya Bandopadhyay

==== Centenary Tribute ====
Person	Title	Director
Bhanu Bandyopadhyay	BHRANTI BILAS	Manu Sen
Bhanu Bandyopadhyay	BHUBON-MOY BHANU	Sarmistha Chakraborty
Eric Rohmer	The Marquise Of O	Eric Rohmer
Federico Fellini	I VITELLONI	Federico Fellini
Federico Fellini	LA VOCE DELLALUNA	Federico Fellini
Federico Fellini	The Truth About La Dolce Vita	Giuseppe Pedersoli
Federico Fellini	LA DOLCE VITA	Federico Fellini
Federico Fellini	Juliet Of The Spirits	Federico Fellini
Federico Fellini	8 1/2	Federico Fellini
Hemanta Mukhopadhyay	SAPTAPADI	Ajoy Kar
Pandit Ravi Shankar	ANURADHA	Hrishikesh Mukherjee

==== Youth Day Celebration ====
Title	Director	Notes
You are the Creator of Your Own Destiny	Nityanand Datta	
Swami Vivekanand	Nirmal Dey	
Bireswar Vivekananda	Madhu Bose	
Biler Diary	Biswarup Biswas	

== Winners ==
- Golden Royal Bengal Tiger Award for Best Film (Innovation in Moving Pictures): Bander Band - Manijeh Hekmat
- Golden Royal Bengal Tiger Award for Best Director (Innovation in Moving Pictures) : Shambala - Artykpai Suiundukov
- Golden Royal Bengal Tiger Award for Best Short: Dusk - Ujjwal Pal
- Golden Royal Bengal Tiger Award for Best Documentary - Highways of Life - Amar Maibam
- Special Jury mention (Innovation in Moving Pictures) : Blindfold - Taras Dron
- Hiralal Sen Memorial Award Best Film (Indian Languages) : False Eye (Kalla Nottam) - Rahul Riji Nair
- Hiralal Sen Memorial Award Best Director (Indian Languages) : God On the Belcony - Biswajit Bhora
- NETPAC Award for Best Film : NONAJOLER KABBO - Rezwan Shahriar Sumit

== See also ==
- 28th Kolkata International Film Festival
