= Biswajeet Bora =

Indian film director

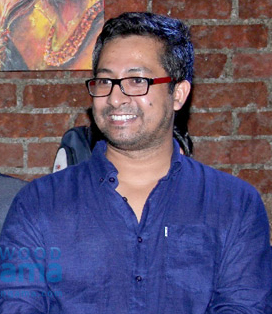
- Born: 8 August 1979 (age 47); Golaghat, Assam, India
- Education: Golaghat Commerce College
- Occupations: Film director producer, writer, and editor
- Years active: 2001–present
- Spouse: Lopamudra Gogoi Bora

Biswajeet Bora (born 8 August 1979) is an Indian film director, producer, writer and editor based in Mumbai. His directorial debut was in 2015 with Aisa Yeh Jahaan, India's first movie to be carbon neutral during production. His film God on the Balcony (2020) won nine awards, including the Royal Bengal Tiger Trophy for Best Director at the 26th Kolkata International Film Festival and the German Star at the Indian Film Festival Stuttgart. Boomba Ride (2021) was one of six Indian films shown at Marché du Film during the Cannes Film Festival 2022. His film Boomba Ride (2021) won the 69th National Film Awards for Best Mishing language film. He also works as a script consultant for a government institution.

== Early life and education ==
Bora was born in the village of No. 1 Senchowa, Golaghat, Assam, India, to Purna Chandra Bora and Monju Bora. He began acting in amateur plays when he was 16 and later enrolled in Evergreen Drama and Film Institute in Golaghat. He also began practicing martial arts and received a black belt in 1999. Bora later shifted his creative focus to writing about films in Assamese newspapers, as well as directing plays. He received his degree in Assamese literature from Golaghat Commerce College in 2001, then moved to Mumbai to pursue film editing.

== Career ==
In Mumbai, Bora worked as a film editor before assisting Jahnu Barua as associate director on several projects, including Ejak Jonakir Jhilmil (2007), for seven years. Bora's 2009 documentary Angel of the Aboriginals: Dr Verrier Elwin, was shown at the Bollywood Beyond Film Festival in Germany and the International Union of Anthropological and Ethnological Sciences conference in Turkey. In 2015, he wrote and directed Aisa Yeh Jahaan, the first Indian film to be carbon-neutral during its filming process. He subsequently directed Bahniman (2016), Phehujali: The Dawn (2017), and Raktabeez (2018). God on the Balcony, which Bora filmed during the COVID-19 pandemic, premiered at the 26th Kolkata International Film Festival in 2021.

Bora's films have appeared at a number of film festivals, including those in Kolkata, Pune, Dhaka, Shanghai, Stuttgart, New York, Kerala, Barcelona, Melbourne, San Francisco, Bengaluru, Washington DC, Rajasthan, Guwahati, and Delhi. Others include the Indian Panorama at the International Film Festival of India, Imagine India International Film Festival, Third Eye Asian Film Festival, Rainbow Film Festival, LASA International Film Festival, and Jagran Film Festival.

== Personal life ==
Bora lives in Mumbai with his wife, writer and fashion designer Lopamudra Gogoi Bora, and their son, Troy.

== Filmography ==
Year	Original title	Title in English	Language	Director	Producer	Writer	Actor	Ref
2008	Ejak Jonakir Jhilmil	A Thousand Fireflies Sparkle	Assamese	Yes	Co-producer	Yes		
2010	Angel of the Aboriginals: Dr Verrier Elwin		English	Yes				
2015	Aisa Yeh Jahaan	The World It Is	Hindi	Yes		Yes		
2016	Bahniman	Bahniman	Assamese	Yes		Yes	Yes	
2017	Phehujali: The Dawn		Assamese	Yes	Yes	Yes		
2018	Raktabeez	Raktabeez	Assamese	Yes		Yes		
2019	Dhuyein se Dhuyein Tak	Smoke	Hindi	Yes		Yes		
2020	Balconit Bhogawan	God on the Balcony	Assamese	Yes		Yes		
2021	Lakhimi	Lakhimi	Assamese	Yes	Co-producer	Yes		
2021	Boomba Ride	Boomba Ride	Assamese/Mising	Yes	Yes	Yes		
2026	Kokadeuta Nati Aru Hati 2		Assamese	Yes				
2026	Birangana Sadhani	Birangana Sadhani	Assamese	Yes		Yes		

== Awards ==
Work	Year	Award	Event	Result	Ref
Aisa Yeh Jahaan	2015	International Award of Excellence	International Film Festival Environment, Health, and Culture	Won	
Aisa Yeh Jahaan	2015	Best Feature Film	Los Angeles Independent Film Festival	Nominated	
Aisa Yeh Jahaan	2015	Silver Award	International Independent Film Awards	Won	
Aisa Yeh Jahaan	2015	Official Finalist & Recognition Award	Mexico International Film Festival	Won	
Aisa Yeh Jahaan	2017	Best Feature Film	4th Arunachal Film Festival	Won	
Bahniman	2016	Assam Talks Best Director		Won	
God on the Balcony	2021	Golden Royal Bengal Tiger Trophy for Best Director	26th Kolkata International Film Festival	Won	
God on the Balcony	2021	Equality in Cinema Award	Indian Film Festival of Melbourne	Won	
God on the Balcony	2021	Best Director	Indian Film Festival of Melbourne	Nominated	
God on the Balcony	2021	Best Indie Film	Indian Film Festival of Melbourne	Nominated	
God on the Balcony	2021	School Film of the Year	8th Indian Film Festival Stuttgart	Won	
God on the Balcony	2021	German Star of India	8th Indian Film Festival Stuttgart	Won	
God on the Balcony	2021	Best Director (Indian Language Films)	Kolkata International Film Festival	Won	
God on the Balcony	2021	Honorable Mention	LASA International Film Festival	Won	
God on the Balcony	2021	Special Mention	Rainbow Film Festival	Won	
God on the Balcony	2021	Best Feature Film	8th Rajasthan International Film Festival	Won	
God on the Balcony	2022	Best Film in Asian Cinema Competition	13th Bengaluru International Film Festival	Won	
Raktabeez	2018	Best Popular Film Award	8th Assam State Film Awards 2023		
Boomba Ride	2021	Best Mishing Language Film	69th National Film Awards	Won	
