= Custody (2019 film) =

2019 short film directed by Ambiecka Pandit

- Directed by: Ambiecka Pandit
- Written by: Ambiecka Pandit
- Screenplay by: Karan Pandit
- Produced by: Priyanka Bangia; Tariq Chauhan; Ambiecka Pandit; Mitchell Speers
- Starring: Geetika Vidya Ohlyan; Karan Pandit; Tanaji Dasgupta; Sanghmitra Hitaishi; Trimala Adhikari; Kashyap Harsha Shangari; Swaroopa Ghosh
- Cinematography: Satya Nagpaul
- Edited by: Atanu Mukherjee
- Release date: 2019

Custody is a 2019 short Indian film directed by Ambiecka Pandit and written by Pandit and Karan Pandit. The film received critical acclaim and won the Best Short Fiction Film award at the 67th National Film Awards.

== Synopsis ==
Set over a few hours during a New Year's Eve celebration, Custody revolves around a group of old friends whose lives take a nerve-wracking turn when the host's baby chokes in a fire. As they struggle to save the baby's life and maintain their bond of years, the film delves into questions of morality and the subjective nature of right and wrong.

== Production ==
Before entering the film industry, Ambiecka Pandit worked as a lawyer for several years. She eventually quit her legal career to pursue her passion in filmmaking, using her savings to make her debut film, Custody. The film was produced by Priyanka Bangia, Tariq Chauhan, Ambiecka Pandit, and Mitchell Speers. Satya Nagpaul served as the cinematographer, while Atanu Mukherjee handled the editing. Devika Dave was responsible for the production design, and Shivani Shivkumar designed the costumes. The film also had Aishwarya Chodankar and Leron D'Souza as assistant directors, Bulganin Baruah as the dialogue editor, Allwin Rego as the sound editor, Sasank Sekhar Sahoo as the assistant camera, and Xavier Joseph as the colorist.

== Reception ==
Custody garnered positive reviews from critics. Cinestan described it as "A clever film that is masterfully executed, Custody keeps you hooked till the end, making you wonder about the characters long after the film is over."

== Awards ==
The film received the Best Short Fiction Film award at the 67th National Film Awards.

== Screening ==
Custody was screened at the 19th Indian Film Festival of Los Angeles, which took place from 20 to 27 May 2021.

== See also ==
- Cinema of India
- Drama film
- Short film
