= Sanshodhan =

- Poster
- Directed by: Govind Nihalani
- Written by: Govind Nihalani; Tripurari Sharma
- Produced by: National Film Development Corporation of India; UNICEF
- Starring: Manoj Bajpayee; Vanya Joshi; Ashutosh Rana; Kishore Kadam; Lalit Parimoo; Vinit Kumar
- Cinematography: Govind Nihalani
- Edited by: Srinivas Patro
- Music by: Vishal Bhardwaj
- Release date: July 23, 1996
- Running time: 163 minutes
- Country: India
- Language: Hindi

Sanshodhan (The Amendment) is a 1996 Indian drama film on the theme of reservation of women's seats in local self-government, produced by National Film Development Corporation of India (NFDC) and United Nations Children's Fund (UNICEF). The film, directed by Govind Nihalani starred Manoj Bajpayee, Vanya Joshi and Ashutosh Rana.

== Plot ==
The story is about the latest Amendment announced by the government, reserving one third of the seats in every Village Panchayat (council) for females. It shows how the female leaders find difficulties in raising their voices in the world all of men. It is also about how the intermediaries take most of the money sent by the government and very little reaches the intended recipient.

At Parmino, the local village committee is all male. But suddenly comes the announcement that an amendment has been passed in the Indian constitution asking for the committee to have women as one third of them. The village head, Ratan, and members decide to let the women in their families contest the reserved seats in the hope that they would continue to have their writ run. While Ratan Singh asks his son, Inder, to get Manju, his wife, to contest, the other members get their wives to contest. Also asked to contest is Vidya, the newly married bride of a poor store owner, Bhanwar, who is indebted to the village head. But Vidya turns the tables on them, asking them to account for the funds for the partially built school.

== Cast ==
- Manoj Bajpayee as Bhanwar
- Harish Khanna as Hariya
- Ashutosh Rana as Clerk
- Lalit Parimoo as Inder Singh
- Kavita Rayirath as Manju
- Anupam Shyam as Ratan Singh
- Aditya Srivastava
