= Satrajit Sen =

Indian film director (born 1977)

- Occupations: Director, Producer
- Partner: Married
- Awards: National Award in the year 2014 for best Bengali Film Bakita Byaktigato as producer

Satrajit Sen (born 31 August 1977) is an Indian film director, producer and entrepreneur. He is the only producer/director in Bengal with a Lee Strasberg Institute workshop experience.

== Career ==
He has directed his debut feature film titled Michael starring Mir Afsar Ali, Soumitra Chatterjee, Swastika Mukherjee, Tanusree Chakraborty, Arunima Ghosh, Sayani Datta, Soumyajit Mazumder, Arijit Dutta, Kanchan Mullick and Payel Mukherjee. He assisted Bill Hopkins, chief assistant to Martin Scorsese and Clint Eastwood, in New York for two months in 2014. He is the founding member of Tripod Entertainment and Major 7th. He won the National Award in the year 2014 for best Bengali Film Bakita Byaktigato as producer. His first film was Maach Mishti and More, the highest-grossing film in the year 2012. He co-produced Ami Aar Amar Girlfriends and Baari Tar Bangla. He presented the winner of IFFI 2015 Bodhon, and the Kerala festival winner for 89.

== Personal life ==
Suchitra Sen is Satrajit's aunt.

He captained the company for four years in the Merchant's Cup Corporate Cricket Tournament at Kolkata and participated in all sporting activities for the school, including rugby. He is a competitor in various car and motorcycle rallies in the East Region.

== Filmography ==
- Maach Mishti & More (2013)
- Ami Aar Amar Girlfriends (2013)
- Bakita Byaktigato (2013)
- Baari Tar Bangla (2014)
- Bodhon (2015)
- 89 (2015)
- Peace Haven (2015)
- Michael (2017)
- Check In Cheque Out (2025)
