= Barah x Barah =

- Directed by: Gaurav Madan
- Written by: Sunny Lahiri; Gaurav Madan
- Starring: Gyanendra Tripathi; Geetika Vidya Ohlyan; Bhumika Dube; Harish Khanna; Akash Sinha; Prithvi Singh; Aashit Chatterjee
- Release date: 24 May 2024
- Country: India
- Language: Hindi

Barah x Barah (transl. 12x12) is a 2024 Indian Hindi-language film directed by Gaurav Madan. It stars Gyanendra Tripathi, Geetika Vidya Ohlyan, Bhumika Dube. The movie depicts life in Varanasi, one of India's oldest cities as it undergoes gradual changes.

== Cast ==
- Gyanendra Tripathi as Sooraj
- Geetika Vidya Ohlyan as Mansi
- Bhumika Dube as Meena
- Harish Khanna as Parbat
- Akash Sinha as Dubey
- Prithvi Singh as Anshuman
- Aashit Chatterjee as Tathagata

== Plot ==
A "death photographer" (who takes the final images of the deceased before cremation) struggles with the impermanence of life at Varanasi’s Manikarnika Ghat. With the rise of smartphones, his profession is becoming obsolete, leading him to confront the loss of meaning in his work and consider migrating for a more secure future.

== Reception ==
Dhaval Roy of The Times of India rated the film 3 out of 5 stars and wrote, "The actors perfectly capture the restrained vein with their understated performances. Gyanendra Tripathi and Bhumika Dube stand out as a gentle couple deeply in love and appreciative of each other. Geetika Vidya Ohlyan, as an independent woman and a loving sister, is powerful. Harish Khanna, as a traditional man, delivers an impactful performance.

While the film’s pacing and lack of flashy visuals might feel slow for those seeking fast-paced narratives, it rewards patient viewers with a meditative exploration of change, mortality, and family dynamics."

== Release ==
Barah x Barah was released in theatres on 24 May 2024.
