= Boomba Ride =

- Directed by: Biswajeet Bora
- Written by: Biswajeet Bora, Lopamudra Gogoi
- Produced by: Luit Kumar Barman, Dr.Kausshik Hazaricka, Binod Lal Das
- Cinematography: Jiten Boro, Atul Sargiyari
- Edited by: Biswajeet Bora
- Music by: Nayan Mani Barman
- Release dates: November 2021 (IFFI); 16 September 2022 (Assam)
- Running time: 76 minutes
- Country: India
- Languages: Mising, Assamese

Boomba Ride is an Assamese film directed by Biswajeet Bora. It is written by Biswajeet Bora and Lopamudra Gogoi. The film is about a lower elementary school where Boomba is the only pupil, and the instructors' major issue is to keep the school open.

== Plot ==
The film is about a lower elementary school where Boomba is the only pupil, and the instructors' major issue is to keep the school open. When things don't go as planned, Boomba uses his upright knowledge to save his school just as it was about to collapse, causing everyone to recognize the positive effects education can have on a community.

== Cast ==
- Sadagar Daw as Head Teacher
- Dipali Pegu as Boomba's mother
- Hiranya Pegu as Teacher
- Indrajeet Pegu as Boomba

== Production ==
Boomba Ride is an Indian film production shot in Dergaon, Assam. It has been made by ML Entertainment, Quartermoon Productions. Besides directing, Bora wrote it with his wife Lopamudra Gogoi and produced it with others. Shooting of this film was completed after 13 days of continuous shoot in the month of November and December in 2020 at Golaghat. The film was shot in the Assamese village of Bormukoli in the Golaghat region, where the dominant language is Mising. There, they carefully selected a few individuals who they then trained.

== Awards ==
Year	Award	Category	Result	Ref
2021	International Film Festival of Kerela	Indian Cinema Now	Nominated	
2021	International Film Festival of India		Nominated	
2021	New York Indian Film Festival	Official Selection	Nominated	
2021	Kolkata International Film Festival	Unheard India: Rare Language Films	Nominated	
2022	Pune International Film Festival		Nominated	
2022	Festival de Cannes	Indian Panorama	Nominated	

== Reception ==
- The 2021 film "Boomba Ride," was fully filmed in the state of Assam, on the banks of the Brahmaputra River, where he spent his formative years. The picture of his youthful hero features Bora. He amplifies his venom, his plots, and his desire to reach the highest point. In Where's My Friend's House, Boomba is Apu's distant cousin, one of Satyajit Ray and Abbas Kiarostami's kids who is imprisoned in a primitive educational system yet driven by an unyielding determination to confront adults' dimwitted viewpoints.
- The way the movie creates its characters gives the movie an identity of its own. Boomba is not as naive as he may appear due to his direct approach to teachers' negotiations with hiss and the humorous results it yields. I also appreciate how each child's persona was given an air of imperfection. They frequently bully, are rude, self-centered, and plagued with self-doubt.
