= Tripurari Sharma =

Indian playwright and theatre director (1956–2023)

- Tripurari Sharma receiving the Sangeet Natak Akademi Awards 2012
- Born: 31 July 1956; Delhi, India
- Died: 1 October 2023 (aged 67); Secunderabad, Telangana, India
- Education: Miranda House, University of Delhi; National School of Drama
- Occupations: Playwright, theatre director, screenwriter, educator
- Known for: Alarippu; Mirch Masala; Sanshodhan
- Awards: Sahitya Kala Parishad Award (2001); Sangeet Natak Akademi Award (2012)

Tripurari Sharma (31 July 1956 – 1 October 2023) was an Indian playwright, theatre director, screenwriter and educator. She was associated with Hindi theatre and theatre activism for nearly three decades. She founded the theatre group Alarippu in 1983 and served as a professor of acting and acting director at the National School of Drama (NSD). She received the Sangeet Natak Akademi Award for Direction in 2012. As a screenwriter, she collaborated with Ketan Mehta and Govind Nihalani in films like Mirch Masala (1986) and Sanshodhan (1996).

She was awarded the Sahitya Kala Parishad Award in 2001 and the Sangeet Natak Akademi Award for Direction in 2012, given by the Sangeet Natak Akademi, India's National Academy of Music, Dance & Drama.

== Biography ==
=== Early life and education ===
Sharma was born on 31 July 1956 in Delhi. She did a B.A. in English literature from Miranda House, University of Delhi, in 1976, where she also served as secretary of the students' union. She subsequently studied theatre direction at the National School of Drama, graduating in 1979.

=== Career ===
In 1983, she founded her theatre group, Alarippu, and subsequently conducted theatre workshops and plays for the Mazdoor Kisan Shakti Sangathan in Rajasthan for its right to information campaign. She also conducted workshops in Bangladesh, Pakistan and Sri Lanka.

She was Professor of acting at the National School of Drama from the mid-1990s until 2018 and later served as its acting director.

== Personal life ==
She died on 1 October 2023 in Secunderabad, at the age of 67, after a prolonged lung-related illness. She was survived by her husband and son.

== Filmography as screenwriter ==
- Mirch Masala (1986)
- Sanshodhan (1996)
- Hazaar Chaurasi Ki Maa (1998, dialogues)
- Swaraaj (2003)

== Bibliography ==
- Sharma, Tripurari (2013). San Sattavan Ka Kissa: Azizun Nisa (2nd ed.). Vani Prakashan. ISBN 9350725398.
- Sharma, Tripurari (2019). Bahu Aks Paheli. Rajkamal Prakashan. ISBN 9788126725199.
- Sharma, Tripurari (2019). Alu. National Book Trust. ISBN 9788123782140.
- Sharma, Tripurari (2022). Aam Aur Koyal. A&A Books. ISBN 9789392664274.
- Sharma, Tripurari. Lal Lal Hathi. ISBN 9788181970534.
- Sharma, Tripurari. Gilahari. A&A Books. ISBN 9788195427185.
- Sharma, Tripurari. Arora, Renu (ed.). Teen Natak: Roop-Aroop, Rangdhuli Aur Radha. Setu Prakashan. ISBN 9789362010100.
- Andha Yug (English), by Dharamvir Bharati, Tr. Tripurari Sharma. National School of Drama. 2001.
