= Geetika Vidya Ohlyan =

Indian actress

- Born: Haryana, India
- Occupation: Actress
- Years active: 2018–present

Geetika Vidya Ohlyan is an Indian actress. She starred in the crime drama film Soni (2018), in which she portrayed a police officer combating crimes against women in Delhi. She also appeared in the critically acclaimed film Thappad (2020), directed by Anubhav Sinha.

== Early life ==
Ohlyan's father organised theatre festivals in Haryana. She attended the University of Delhi's Kirori Mal College, where she joined her college's theatre society, and directed and wrote scripts during her studies. Ohlyan graduated in 2012 with a degree in English literature. Ohlyan had already been familiar with the script prior to that because she had done some work from English to Hindi. She said of the script: "On reading it, I instantly fell in love, knowing exactly what the film was trying to say."

== Career ==
She made her acting debut in the crime drama film Soni (2018), in which she portrayed a police officer combating crimes against women in Delhi. She also appeared in the film Thappad (2020), and will be appear in the upcoming film Barah by Barah by director Gaurav Madan.

Ohlyan won a Critics' Choice Film Award for Best Actress for her performance in Soni. WION News said Ohlyan was "breaking all the stereotypes with her roles".

== Filmography ==
Key
†	Denotes films/shows that have not yet been released

=== Films ===
Year	Title	Role	Notes	Ref.
2018	Soni	Soni	Debut film	
2019	Nawaab	Devika	Short film	
2019	Custody	–	Short film	
2020	Thappad	Sunita		
2020	Unpaused	Seema	Segment: Vishanu; Amazon Prime film	
2022	Opium	Ashrafa		
2022	Tera Kya Hoga Lovely	Hawaldar Chandrawel		
2023	Dilli Dark	spiritual leader Mansi		
2024	Fairy Folk	Geet		
2024	Barah by Barah	Mansi		
2026	Satluj	Paramjit		
2026	Babita Singh Reporting	Karamjeet		

=== Television ===
Year	Title	Role	Platform	Notes
2020	Pawan & Pooja	Mehak	MX Player	8 episodes
2022	Escaype Live	Sita	Disney+ Hotstar	9 episodes
2023	School of Lies	Trisha	Disney+ Hotstar	8 episodes

== Awards and nominations ==
Year	Award	Nominated work	Category	Result	Ref.
2020	Critics' Choice Film Awards, India	Soni	Best Actress (Hindi)	Won	
2021	Critics' Choice Film Awards, India	Thappad	Best Supporting Actress	Nominated	
2020	FOI Online Awards	Soni	Best Actress in a Leading Role	Won	
2021	FOI Online Awards	Thappad	Best Actress in a Supporting Role	Nominated	
