= Soni (film) =

2018 film by Ivan Ayr

- Netflix release poster
- Directed by: Ivan Ayr
- Screenplay by: Ivan Ayr; Kislay
- Produced by: Kimsi Singh; Kartikeya Narayan Singh
- Starring: Geetika Vidya Ohlyan; Saloni Batra
- Cinematography: David Bolen
- Edited by: Ivan Ayr; Gurvinder Singh
- Music by: Nicholas Jacobson-Larson; Andrea Penso
- Production companies: Jabberwockee Talkies; The Film Cafe Production
- Distributed by: Netflix
- Release dates: 8 September 2018 (Venice); 18 January 2019 (Netflix)
- Running time: 97 minutes
- Country: India
- Language: Hindi

Soni is a 2018 Indian Hindi-language crime drama film directed by Ivan Ayr. Produced by Kimsi Singh and Kartikeya Narayan Singh, the film stars Geetika Vidya Ohlyan and Saloni Batra in the lead roles. It was written by Ayr and Kislay and chronicles the life of police officer Soni (Ohlyan) and her superintendent in Delhi Police Kalpana (Batra), who deal with crimes against women in the city.

The idea for Soni occurred to Ayr in 2014 when he was reading that Delhi was being put under scrutiny for not being safe for women, especially after the 2012 gang rape case. Ayr read several articles and interviews about the Delhi police and was interested in woman officers' reactions to cases of sexual violence. He spent time with several Delhi police personnel and observed their daily routine. Pre-production started in November 2016 and Ayr finished the script in January 2017 and the film was shot for 24 days in Delhi in February. David Bolen served as the director of photography while Ayr and Gurvinder Singh edited the film.

Soni premiered in the Orizzonti (Horizons) section of the 75th Venice International Film Festival, receiving a standing ovation. The film was also screened at the 2018 BFI London Film Festival, the 2018 MAMI Film Festival, and the Pingyao International Film Festival, where it won the Best Film award and a cash prize of $20,000, half of which went to fund development of the director's next project. The other half was provided to the film's distributor in China. Ayr received a special mention for "Achievement in Directing" for the film at the 2018 Asia Pacific Screen Awards. The film was released on 18 January 2019 on Netflix to critical acclaim with particular praise for its direction and the performances.

== Plot ==
Soni is a police officer who, following her divorce, lives alone in Delhi. She is friends with senior superintendent Kalpana Ummat, who lives with her husband Sandeep, who is a high-ranking officer in the Delhi police. Soni's ex-husband Naveen often visits her, trying to persuade her to rekindle their relationship but she is not interested.

One day, while on duty, Soni beats a street goon who tries to harass her. Kalpana reprimands Soni for her temperamental and impulsive behaviour, while also expressing concern about her safety. A day later at a check post, Soni again gets involved in a violent incident when she slaps a drunken navy officer who is driving without a licence and misbehaves with her.

The commissioner of police take disciplinary action against Soni for the check post incident. Kalpana tries to persuade Sandeep and her seniors against it, but Soni is transferred to the police control room and an inquiry is set up to look into the incident.

A few days later, Soni is brought back into the police after Kalpana's intercession. The two later go to a restaurant to relax. Soni goes to the ladies washroom, which has been occupied by a group of young men who are consuming drugs. She gets into a fight with them and injures her hand before they are arrested. One of the men is found to be the son of a minister's friend.

After the incident, Sandeep scolds Kalpana, holding her responsible for the fight. The arrested men are released immediately, while Soni is taken off duty and sent back to the control room. Kalpana on the other hand realizes that Soni is right and arrests the minister's friend's son knowing the consequences.

== Cast ==
- Geetika Vidya Ohlyan as Soni
- Saloni Batra as Kalpana Ummat
- Vikas Shukla as Naveen
- Mohit S. Chauhan as Sandeep
- Simrat Kaur plays Nishu, Soni's teenage niece and Mohinder Gujral plays Sandeep's mother.

== Production ==
=== Development ===
Ivan Ayr studied screenwriting and film direction at the San Francisco Film Society and directed such short films as Lost and Found and Quest for a Different Outcome during the time. Ayr decided to make Soni in 2014 when he was reading articles reporting that Delhi had been put under the "spotlight of shame" for not being safe for women, especially after the 2012 Delhi gang rape. He felt disturbed and said he started "questioning my own understanding of the city". Ayr then read several articles and interviews about the Delhi police and found they have "probably the highest proportion of policewomen in the force" in the country. He was interested in how a female police officer would react to sexual assault. He said the film deals with gender issue; "The assumption is that if they are female cops they will be in a position of power, they won't be susceptible to everyday crimes that other women face".

Ayr said that the gang rape incident prompted him to write a story, "may be the seed was sown then but it took time to settle in the subconscious". Pre-production started in November 2016; Ayr spent time with several Delhi police personnel and observed their "daily grind, the dynamics and hierarchies within". Ayr said he was motivated to write the script by observing the way female and male police officers would work and how they react to cases of crime against women. He requested senior police officials to allow him to spend time with their teams as they went about their jobs. To get a female perspective into the story, Ayr used producer Kimsi Singh as a "sounding board" from the first draft. Later on, Ayr's former screenwriting teacher Lisa Rosenberg got involved as a script consultant. He said he wanted the film to be as realistic as possible, "I realised that even if I’m writing it consciously, some male opinions may become dominant in the script, or I might miss out on a woman's perspective." He completed the script with Kislay in January 2017. Ayr based the central character Soni on several police officers he met during the research. Ayr said he co-wrote, edited and directed the film because of the low budget. He took inspiration from Jafar Panahi's 2006 Iranian film Offside for the treatment.

=== Casting and filming ===
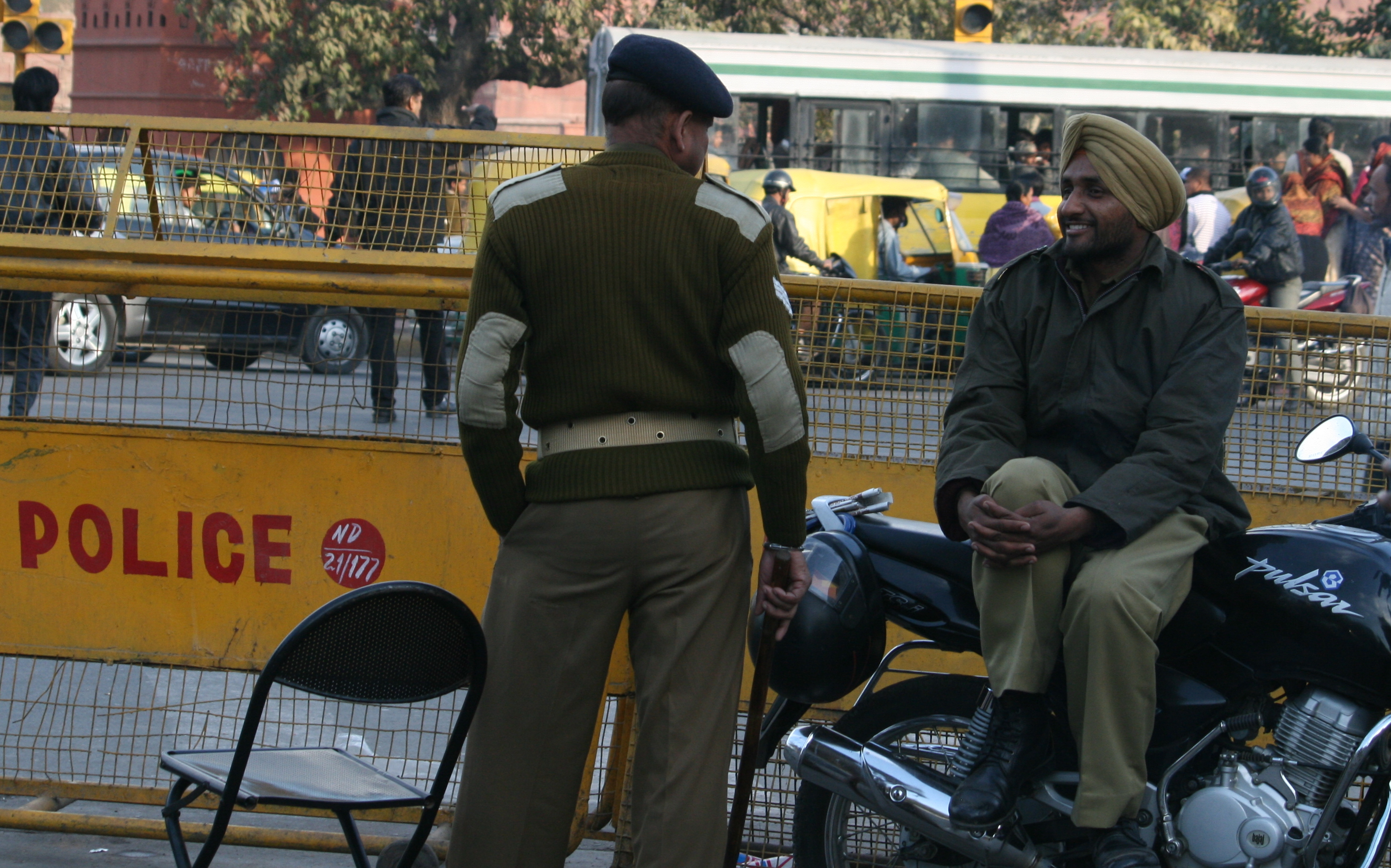
Ayr observed several Delhi police officers for the research.

Geetika Vidya Ohlyan was studying at Delhi University and was also involved with street and stage plays. On 30 December 2015, she got a call from a senior theatre personnel who told her about an "amazing role"; this was followed by a call from a member of the directorial team who wanted her to "self-tape" an audition for the film. Ohlyan sent her tape and received a call from Ayr, who liked her audition and asked her to come in for improvised rounds, after which she was cast in the role of Soni. Saloni Batra, who had also auditioned for the role was eventually cast as superintendent Kalpana. Batra had no prior acting experience and had specialised in fashion accessories, but was drawn to the project after reading the script: "[I] was blown away by the depth of understanding that Ivan, being a man, had of women."

The actors did workshops together and worked on their body language and posture. Ohlyan said she picked Puma as a reference for her body language; "the stillness that the animal possesses, its incessant alertness at the back of its head". She felt the character had to "look stiff and poised, but be ready to pounce because you are always alert". Ayr opted for a more restrained approach for Kalpana's character to put her in direct contrast with Soni, who was shown to be fierce. Ohlyan explained Kalpana's character as somebody Soni wanted to be but had no way of being, calling her "very thoughtful, but also ferocious in her own way".

Ohlyan and Batra also visited local police stations, where they spent time with female police officers and observed their mannerisms and routine. Ohlyan met the station house officer of her university for research. She observed that there were several occasions when the station officer could not go home to her family: "I saw how she had an entire sleeping area set up at her police station." Ohlyan said that she realised the difference between the personal and the private life of a policewoman was "very stark". The supporting cast consisted mainly of non-actors or part-time actors from Delhi, which Ayr said contributed to the "colloquial authenticity in the film". The film was shot for 24 days in Delhi in February, 2017. It was mostly made using handheld cameras with a mixture of natural and artificial light sources. The scenes in the film were shot in single take as Ayr wanted to "stay in a particular space and time with the characters, without the intrusion of cuts." The opening scene was inspired by a Delhi police programme in which a policewoman was teased while cycling and the rest of the force was monitoring her. In November 2017, Soni was selected by the Work in Progress Lab of National Film Development Corporation of India's Film Bazaar under the mentorship of French editor Jacques Comets and director Marco Mueller.

== Release ==
Soni premiered in the Orrizonti (Horizons) section of the 75th Venice International Film Festival, receiving a standing ovation. The film won the Facebook Award for Best 'Work-In-Progress' project. Ayr received a special mention for "Achievement in Directing" for the film at the 2018 Asia Pacific Screen Awards. It was screened at the 2018 BFI London Film Festival.

It was followed by a screening at the 2018 MAMI Film Festival, where the film won the Oxfam Award on Gender Equality. It won the Best film award at the Pingyao International Film Festival that included a cash prize of $20,000, half of which went to fund development of the director's next project and the other half was provided to the film's distributor in China.

The film was released in the UK on three screens from 12 to 16 October 2018. It was one of five to be selected by the National Film Development Corporation of India to be part of the prestigious ‘Work in Progress’ Lab at Film Bazaar 2017. The film was released on 18 January 2019 on Netflix. Its first trailer was released on 25 August 2018.

== Reception ==
On the review aggregator website Rotten Tomatoes, Soni has an approval rating of 88%, based on 16 reviews, with an average rating of 6.1/10. On Metacritic, the film has a weighted average score of 68 out of 100, based on 4 critics, indicating "generally favorable reviews".

Baradwaj Rangan called Soni "a rare kind of feminist film" that is "less of a polemic, more of a quiet character study". Namrata Joshi of The Hindu said the film "cut[s] too close to the bone in its own quiet, discreet, unobtrusive yet unflinching way". She also wrote; "It's a slice of life portrayal of incipient and accepted patriarchal perversions". Shubhra Gupta of The Indian Express wrote that the film "stands out by making its lead protagonists women who lead by example" and praised the performances of Ohlyan and Batra. Nandakumar Rammohan of The Quint called the single-shot camerawork "unobtrusive" and said it makes the audience "feel like a fly on the wall, quietly observing the lives of these women". He also wrote; "Soni is restrained and creates an atmosphere that might get your blood boiling but never reflects that aggression in the film itself". Rahul Desai of Film Companion gave a positive response and called Soni an "excellently acted, nuanced and unflinching mirror to our times".

Akhil Arora of NDTV called Soni "by far Netflix's most nuanced and best acquisition from India yet". Jyoti Sharma Bawa of Hindustan Times called the film "an underrated gem in Netflix's grand treasure. The film deserved a better launch and more faith." Poulomi Das of Arre labelled the film "supremely well-acted, shot, and directed", and said it is not "as much a film about gender equality as it is about the continued endurance of gender inequality in India". Saibal Chatterjee of NDTV noted that the film shows the inside of a police station "in a manner that mainstream Hindi cinema rarely does and draws the audience gradually into a world where the two protagonists have to fight many battles, private and public, to hold their ground without abandoning their principles". Ashameera Aiyappan of The New Indian Express wrote that Soni "doesn't offer solutions, it just lets you ponder". Devasheesh Pandey of News18 said the film is "essentially woven in realism" with a "simple and effective" storytelling technique.

Karishma Upadhyay of Firstpost called Soni "without a doubt, Netflix's best Hindi film offering yet"; she also praised Geetika and Saloni's acting and said they "command your attention with their restrained yet powerful performances". A review carried by Indo-Asian News Service praised the film and said the director "captures the rhythms of Soni's life with candour and conviction and little room for self-congratulation". Saraswati Datar of The News Minute said the film's script "draws you into a slow burn drama that unfolds largely at night, and in the confines of the protagonists' homes, a police station, and the bleak streets of New Delhi". Priyanka Roy from The Telegraph wrote that Soni "hits close to home ... We are shown Soni not only battling prejudice and sexism, but also living the life of a single woman in an apathetic metropolis, her loneliness and frustration palpable". Siddhant Adlakha of Polygon said the film "frames neither fury nor empathy as hidden solutions, but as equally necessary survival mechanism, and it does so through constant, expertly timed movement, capturing confusion, volatility, and tenderness, often in the same breath".

Tanul Thakur of The Wire wrote that Soni "deals with familiar motifs, but its methods are home-grown and original ... As the film dives deep into the protagonists’ personal lives, we see relationships, and snatches of scenes, that have eluded Hindi cinema for long". Biswadeep Ghosh of National Herald called the film "powerful and moving", and said it "intermittently reminds us of the vicious circle of patriarchy that is omnipresent in our so-called modern society". Sreehari Nair of Rediff.com called Soni a "soft treatment of a very complex subject". Jai Arjun Singh said; "Instead of providing easy answers, Soni gives us a few vignettes from the lives of Soni and Kalpana". He praised the acting of Ohlyan and Batra, calling them "extraordinary, lived-in performances". Uday Bhatia of Mint wrote; "This is a film that lives in its details—of body language, of placement within scenes, of words that sting and disarm".

Among the overseas reviewers, Jay Weissberg of Variety wrote; "An intelligent, subtle script and unobtrusively bravura camerawork are the hallmarks of this indie Indian gem about two policewomen combating harassment and gender expectations". J. Hurtado of Screen Anarchy said the film has "gripping storytelling, well-rounded believable characters, and great acting by the two leads, Geetika Vidya and Saloni Batra". He included it in his list of "14 Favorite Indian Films of 2018". Simran Kaur of The Strand Magazine wrote: "A brilliant script manages to elucidate the struggles, both personal and professional, that these women go through with great depth by shifting the film between short excerpts of each of their lives as well as their scenes together, where their connection slowly grows".

Deborah Young of The Hollywood Reporter wrote: "A feminist viewpoint becomes as gripping as a TV police drama". Writing for The Daily Dot, Eddie Strait said the film "invokes shades of the great Iranian directors Jafar Panahi and Asghar Farhadi", and that, "Ayr isn't interested in condemnation ... his film thrives on compassion". Elisabeth Vincentelli of The New York Times wrote: "Ayr does not offer any tension-releasing catharsis, making his film efficiently disquieting in its own unassuming manner". She also wrote that a few single-take scenes "extend their welcome and become plodding".
