= Aisa Yeh Jahaan =

- Directed by: Biswajeet Bora
- Written by: Biswajeet Bora
- Produced by: Maya Kholie
- Starring: Palash Sen; Ira Dubey; Kymsleen Kholie; Yashpal Sharma; Saurabh V Pandey; Prisha Dabbas
- Narrated by: Om Puri
- Cinematography: Vierendrra Lalit
- Edited by: Suresh Pai
- Music by: Score; Anurag Saikia; Songs; Palash Sen
- Production company: Kholie Entertainment
- Release dates: April 2015 (Mexico International Film Festival); 24 July 2015
- Running time: 129 minutes
- Country: India
- Languages: Hindi; Assamese

Aisa Yeh Jahaan (transl. This place is like that) is a 2015 Indian drama film, directed and written by Biswajeet Bora and produced by Maya Kholie. The film is India's first carbon neutral film and stars Palash Sen, Ira Dubey and Kymsleen Kholie in lead roles, with Yashpal Sharma, Saurabh Pandey, Tinu Anand, Carol Gracias, Prisha Dabbas and Saurabh Pandey in supporting roles. The film was released on 24 July 2015.

== Plot ==
The film is set in Mumbai. It depicts the relationship between a husband and wife, the ever-growing human detachment from nature and people's attitude towards the physiology of a child's growth which is portrayed in a lighthearted yet satirical fashion. Rajib works for a multinational company and is far apart in terms of his nature from his wife, Ananya, who is a receptionist at a private firm. On the other hand, Kuhi, their three-year-old daughter, and Pakhi, the domestic help of the house, share a relationship based on innocence and pure emotions. Pakhi takes good care of Kuhi when Rajib and Ananya are away at work during the day. The whole family plans a vacation to their hometown Golaghat in Assam. There, Kuhi gets to know Nalia Kai, the helper of the house, who introduces her to a new world – a world of trees, birds, greenery, paddy fields and the environment at large. There she realizes the difference between the concrete world of Mumbai and the natural environment of her father's hometown. She also fears that one day the people of Mumbai would not have air to breathe, as she learns that we get oxygen from trees. This compels her to question the scarcity of trees in Mumbai.

== Cast ==
- Palash Sen as Rajib Saikia
- Ira Dubey as Ananya Saikia
- Yashpal Sharma as Nalia Kai (Domestic help of Mr. Saikia's household)
- Kymsleen Kholie as Pakhi
- Tinu Anand as Majid Khan (Director in the movie)
- Carol Gracias as Club Singer
- Prisha Dabbas as Kuhi Saikia (Rajib and Ananya's child)
- Saurabh Pandey ATCC as Ron (Ananya's cousin)
- Bishnu Khargharia - Gunakanta Saikia (Rajib's father)

== Production ==
Aisa Yeh Jahaan is a socio-environmental film that focuses on life and survival. Written and directed by Biswajeet Bora & produced by Maya Kholie under Kholie Entertainment, the shooting of the movie started on 15 May 2014 in Meghalaya and was completed on 24 August 2014.

=== Carbon offsets ===
CERE (Center for Environmental Research and Education) established in 2002 by Dr. (Ms.) Rashnesh N. Pardiwala, an ecologist from University of Edinburgh, and Mrs. Kitayun Rustom, an environmental educationalist, is a pioneer in the field of corporate sustainability and carbon management systems. They help organizations map their carbon footprint, meet international reporting standards, and implement low-cost carbon reduction strategies.

CERE is conducting an audit based on certain parameters to measure the emissions associated with producing this film. Based on the audit, CERE will assist the production team of Aisa Yeh Jahaan to take steps to offset the carbon emitted through the entire production process through a massive afforestation program. Essentially, CERE will be helping the producers of Aisa Yeh Jahaan 'remove' as much carbon dioxide (as trees absorb carbon dioxide) from the atmosphere as they have put in, making what is claimed to be the first carbon-neutral film production.

Their aim is to plant 500 saplings out of which 330 saplings have been planted. CERE has planted 230 trees in Bhiwandi, Mumbai. They have made an MOU with the villagers stating that they won't destroy the plants at least till the year 2030.

=== Filming ===
This film is set majorly in Mumbai and partly in Assam & Meghalaya. Regions such as Meghalaya (Barapani Lake) and Golaghat District of Assam (No 1. Senchowa, Betioni, Bokaghat, Chinatolly & Aborghat) have contributed the most.

The movie has a cast of 30 actors. The filming was completed in 45 days (including picturization of six songs).

== Soundtrack ==
Aisa Yeh Jahaan

Soundtrack album by Palash Sen
- Released: 30 June 2015
- Genre: Feature film soundtrack
- Length: 28:37
- Language: Hindi
- Label: Zee Music Company
External audio
- Audio Jukebox on YouTube

The soundtrack of Aisa Yeh Jahaan comprises 6 songs composed by Palash Sen the lyrics of which have been written by Deekshant Sehrawat, Dahlia Sen-Oberoi, Suneet Bora along with Palash Sen himself.

Tracklist
No.	Title	Lyrics	Singer(s)	Length
1.	"Sautela Sheher"	Dr Palash Sen, Deekshant Sehrawat	Dr Palash Sen, Kamakshi Khanna, Abid Khan Langa	5:10
2.	"Haiyya Ho"	Dr. Palash Sen (Assamese words: Suneet Bora)	Suneet Bora (Backup Vocals: Kamakshi Khanna, Shibani Budhraja, Kimberley)	2:26
3.	"Lori - Nanhi Munni Chidiya"	Deekshant Sehrawat, Dr Palash Sen	Anjana Padmanabhan	5:01
4.	"Aisa Yeh Jahaan"	Dr Palash Sen, Deekshant Sehrawat (Rap Lyrics: Aashish Ddavidd)	Naresh Kamath, Kezleen Kholie (Rap: Aashish Ddavidd)	4:15
5.	"We Go Party Everyday"	Dahlia Sen-Oberoi, Dr Palash Sen	Abhilasha Sinha, Kinshuk Sen, DJ Bhaduri & Dr Palash Sen	4:18
6.	"Hey Ya"	Dahlia Sen-Oberoi, Dr Palash Sen	Dr Palash Sen (Backup Vocals: Kamakshi Khanna, Shibani Budhraja, Kimberley)	4:51
Total length:				28:37

== Critical reception ==
Mohar Basu of The Times of India gave the film a rating of 2 out of 5 and said that, "The movie has its heartfelt peaks but suffers from inconsistent writing." Paloma Sharma of Rediff gave the film a rating of 2 out of 5 and said that, "Despite strong performances, Aisa Yeh Jahaan fails to engage due to its shaky storyline and scattered plot." Akshay Kaushal of News18 felt that the movie was lacking in entertainment value. The critic gave the film a rating of 1.5 out of 5 and said that, "It beautifully depicts the Assamese culture but the storyline falls flat." Shaheen Parkar of Mid-Day praised the performances of the actors but found the movie to be quite slow. The critic gave the film a rating of 2 out of 5 and said that, "The characterisation is relatable, but at times the film appears to be a documentary." Rachit Gupta of Filmfare wasn't impressed with the film and said that, "The film suffers from a busload of bad direction. It’s got a good heart. The efforts of Dr Palash Sen and Ira Dubey do make the film worthwhile, but even they left are [sic] grappling with a short rope. The story is too disjointed. Shubhra Gupta of The Indian Express gave the film a rating of 1.5 out of 5 and said that, "It has a nice premise. But its execution is amateurish." Mihir Fadnavis of Hindustan Times gave the film a rating of 1 out of 5 and said that, "The film essentially is a series of half-baked attempts at exploring a bouquet of unconnected themes. Social commentary needs mature filmmaking, and Aisa Yeh Jahaan falls far short."
