= Amit Saha =

Indian actor (born 1970)

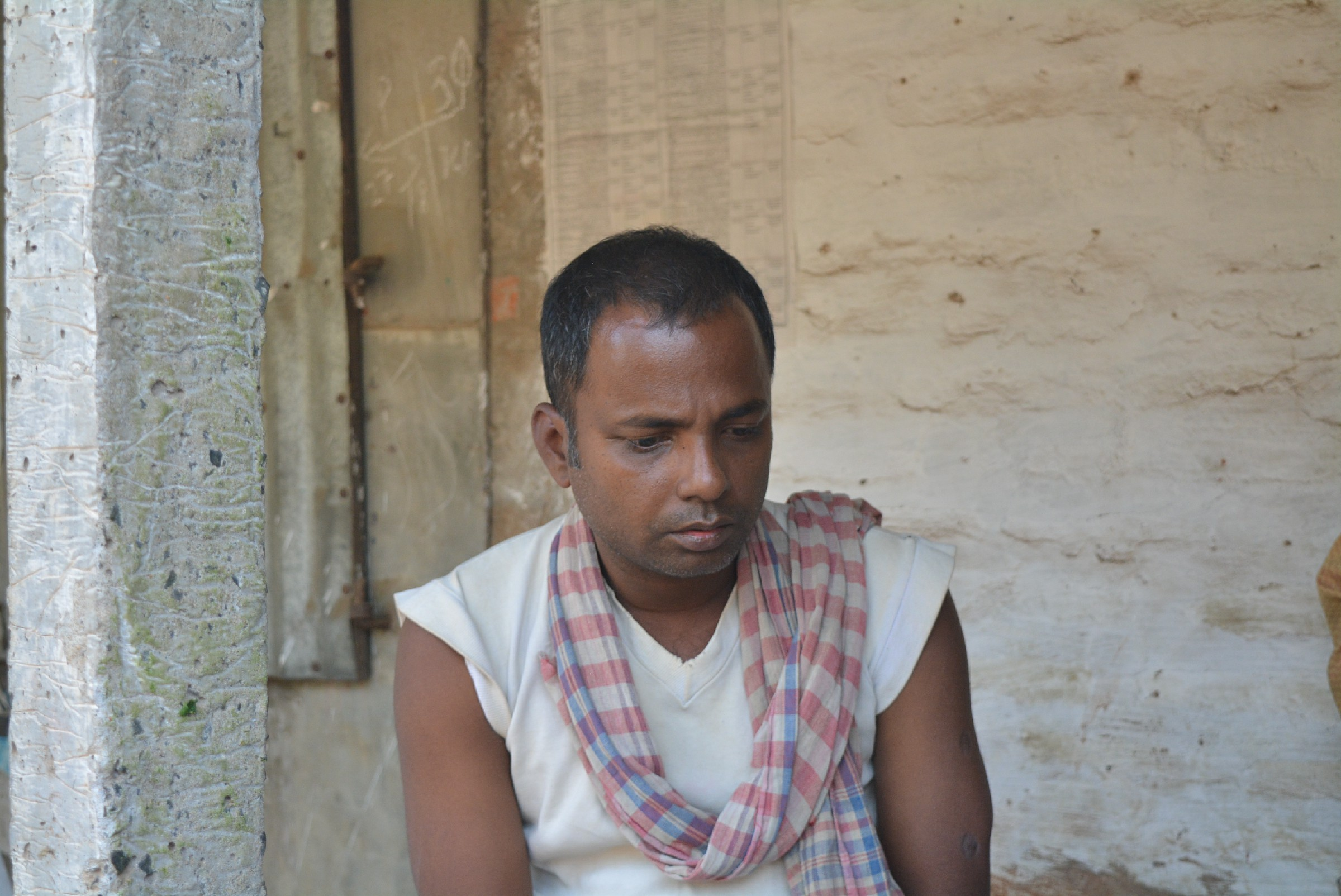
- Born: 6 November 1978 (age 48); Kolkata, West Bengal, India
- Occupation: Actor

Amit Saha (born 6 November 1978) is an Indian actor primarily working in Bengali film. He starred in the National Award Winning film Bakita Byaktigoto with Ritwik Cakroborty. He established a reputation for nuanced roles in critically acclaimed films. He was lauded for his leading role The Slow Man and His Raft and The Academy of Fine Arts. He appeared in Bollywood projects such as Lootera and Jazz City.

== Career ==
Saha's career is marked by a transition from theatre to the silver screen. He gained significant attention for his performance in Bakita Byaktigato, which won the National Film Award for Best Bengali Film. His ability to portray relatable, everyday characters with "quiet intensity" became a hallmark of his acting style.

== Controversy ==
In 2022 he was assaulted by goons of Trinamool Congress cadres in West Bengal for staging plays. This resulted in a massive outrage by the entire film industry. Actors and Directors like Anirban Bhattacharya and Sumon Mukhopadhyay openly supported him.

== Filmography ==
Amit Saha has appeared in over 30 projects, ranging from experimental features to popular web series. His Key works include:

- Bakita Byaktigoto
- The Academy of Fine Arts
- Bodjaat
- Buro sadhu
- The Slow Man and his Raft
- Japani Toy
- Bibhishon
- Birohi
