= Bandar Band =

2020 Iranian film

- Directed by: Manijeh Hekmat
- Written by: Manijeh Hekmat; Mostafa Zandi
- Produced by: Manijeh Hekmat, Mahshid Ahangarani Farahani, Yasmin Khalifa
- Starring: Reza Koolghani; Pegah Ahangarani; Amir Hossein Taheri; Mahdieh Mousavi
- Cinematography: Sajjad Avarand
- Edited by: Navid Tohidi
- Music by: Farshad Fozouni
- Production companies: Bamdad Film, kapFilme
- Release date: September 15, 2020 (TIFF)
- Running time: 75 minutes
- Country: Iran
- Language: Persian

Bandar Band is an Iranian drama film, directed by Manijeh Hekmat and released in 2020. The film centres on a trio of musicians who have entered a music competition in Tehran, but whose travel plans are complicated and upended by the 2019 Iran floods.

The film premiered at the 2020 Toronto International Film Festival.
