= Satyaki Banerjee =

Indian Bengali composer

Satyaki Banerjee সাত্যকি ব্যানার্জি
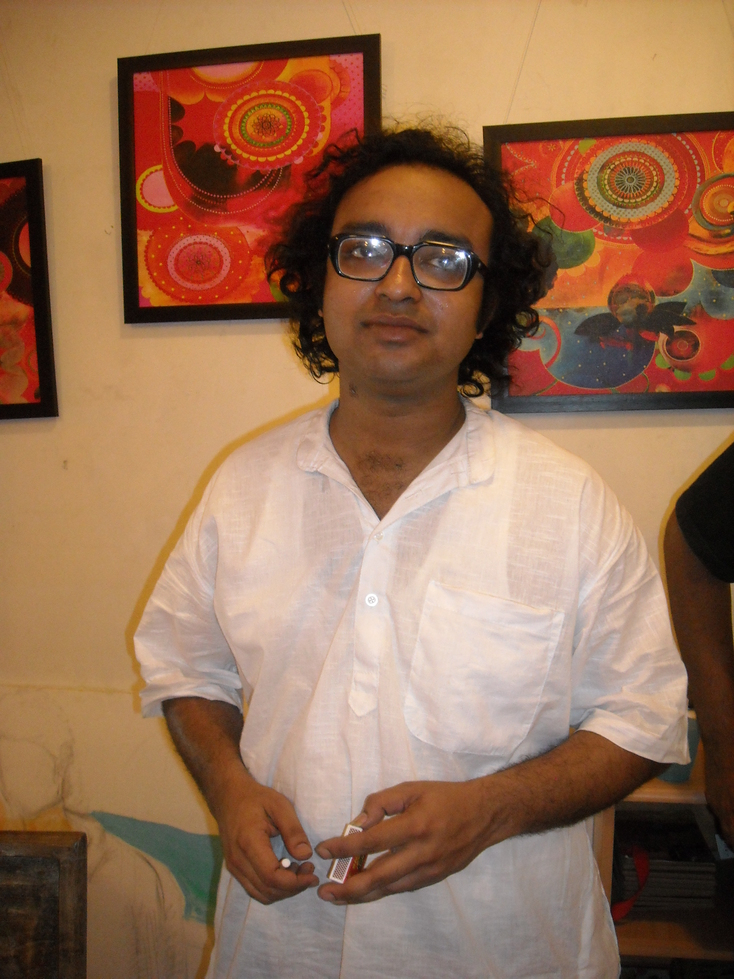
- Satyaki Banerjee's Performance at Hauz Khas Village, New Delhi in Meetings in Music – Moushumi Bhowmik, Satyaki Banerjee and Rosalind Acton in Concert on 13 May 2012

Background information
- Born: Satyaki Banerjee
- Origin: India
- Genre: Bengali folk music
- Instruments: Sarod, Dotara
- Years active: 2005–present

Satyaki Banerjee (Bengali: সাত্যকি ব্যানার্জি) is an Indian Bengali composer. He is a part of an Anglo-Bengali band with members in Kolkata and London. He plays instruments like the dotara and the sarod, and his performances incorporate both the classical and the folk idioms. He studied the sarod with the late Pandit Dipak Chowdhury and now trains under Pandit Tejendra Narayan Majumdar. He picked up the dotara in the company of practising folk musicians, in akhras and melas and in him the classical and folk meld to evolve into a unique style of playing. He is also a self-taught oud and rabab player, besides being a magnificent singer of mostly Bengali mystical poetry, in the baul and kirtan traditions.

== Personal life ==
Satyaki is a historian by training and takes serious academic interest in the music he practices. He studied from Julien Day School, Kolkata, Elgin Road branch.

== Music life ==
Satyaki has been part of Parapar since 2005, but he has also performed independently with Mousumi Bhowmik in concerts at home and abroad, including in New York, London, Leeds, Dhaka and Chittagong. Banerjee is the music director of 2021 Bengali web series Birohi.
