= Manijeh Hekmat =

Iranian film director (born 1962)

- منیژه حکمت
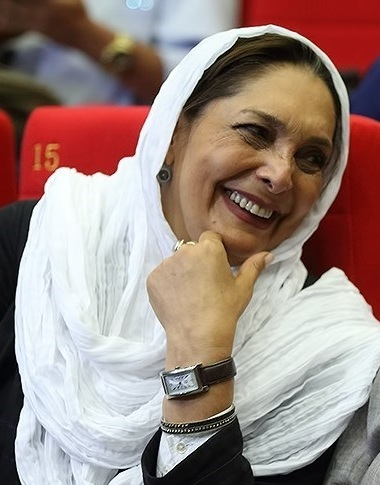
- Born: 23 March 1962 (age 64); Arak, Iran
- Occupation: Film director
- Years active: 1995–present

Manijeh Hekmat (Persian: منیژه حکمت,; born 23 March 1962 in Arak) is an Iranian film director. She has worked since 1980 as an assistant director and production designer in over 25 films. She directed her first feature film Women's Prison (Zendān-e Zanān) in 2002. This film has been shown at over 80 international film festivals and has received seven prizes. Three Women (Seh Zan) is Hekmat's second feature film made in 2007. Hekmat has produced five noted films which include the award-winning feature films The Girl in the Sneakers and A Bunch of Grass, the latter a German-produced film made in the Iranian Kurdistan. In her 2018 movie, The Old Road, Hekmat addressed the social problem of violence against women.

Hekmat is married to the film director Jamshid Āhangarāni. Their daughter, Pegāh Āhangarāni, is a film actress.

== Filmography ==
- 2002: Women's Prison (Zendān-e Zanān): Writer, director, producer
- 2004: The Wall: Director
- 2008: Three Women (Seh Zan): Director, producer
- 2009: Sedaha: Producer
- 2010: Poopak and Mash Mashallah (Poopak va Mash Mashallah): Producer
- 2011: No Men Allowed: Executive producer
- 2020: There Are Things You Don't Know (Chiz-haie hast keh nemidani): Producer
- 2014: City of Mice 2 (Shahr-e Mushha 2): Producer
- 2015: The Gap: Producer
- 2018: The Old Road: Director, producer
- 2020: Bandar Band: Director, producer
