= Bakita Byaktigato =

2013 Indian Bengali film

Bakita Byaktigato (Rest is Personal)
- Film poster
- Directed by: Pradipta Bhattacharyya
- Written by: Pradipta Bhattacharyya
- Screenplay by: Pradipta Bhattacharyya
- Story by: Pradipta Bhattacharyya
- Produced by: Arka Paul, Satrajit Sen
- Starring: Ritwick Chakraborty; Aparajita Ghosh Das; Madhabi Mukherjee; Churni Ganguly; Monu Mukhopadhyay; Amit Saha
- Cinematography: Subhankar Bhar
- Edited by: Pradipta Bhattacharyya
- Music by: Anindya Sundar Chakraborty
- Production company: Tripod Entertainment
- Release dates: 29 June 2013 (Seattle, USA); 7 July 2013 (Canada); 20 September 2013 (Kolkata, India)
- Running time: 2 hr 23 min
- Country: India
- Language: Bengali

Bakita Byaktigato (transl. Rest is Personal) is a Bengali drama film directed by Pradipta Bhattacharyya and produced by Tripod Entertainment (IN). It won the 61st National Film Awards for Best Feature Film in Bengali.

== Plot ==
Pramit, an independent filmmaker is trying to understand the nature of romance, also partially the reason behind it being he is trying to find romance as he has been continually rejected by various romantic interests. Thus, he along with his cameraman Amit venture on an adventure to ask various people in Kolkata what they feel about romance and whether they have ever experienced it or not in a documentary-type manner. Eventually they meet an astrologer, who at first seemed like a complete fraudster. But later claimed that he would give them a solution to their problem, they along with the astrologer go to the astrologer's home and find out that he has two wives, both apparently unhappy. The astrologer tells them that there is a hamlet in West Bengal which has an otherworldly ability to make people find romance and true love. However he being unable to disclose all the information needed for them to go to that Hamlet, gives them an address of a man called Naren Shashmol, they eventually find out Naren's house and enquires him about that Hamlet, he tells them that he too fell in love in that Hamlet in the 1980s and his wife died about 5–7 years ago. He also informs them that the name of the hamlet is "Mohini", but even he too doesn't know the location of the place and has forgotten all the specificities of the place, however at the very end after they were returning hopelessly he gathers an address of Mallika Saha and claims that she can help them out. The address turns out to be outdated but they track her down and uncover the information relating to "Mohini", which is a hamlet only accessible via bus services from Dharmatala to Shikarpur to finally Najirpur and then a man would escort them to "Mohini", also finding out that she was Naren's (her Physics professor's) student and whilst studying Physics Honours at Ashutosh College was infatuated with her collegemate Debashish, however the attraction was unreciprocated and later after they both met in "Mohini" fell in love with each other irresistibly, but because of their incompatibility in caste, their families didn't allow them to marry each other and Debashish went away to USA settling and marrying there, however in another scene Debashish confesses that he still loves Mallika. Later Pramit reunites them in a restaurant.

By this time Pramit and Amit get prepared and travel to Najirpur, after a long await they are finally visited by a man Viz. Bhabenda, who by his van carry them to "Mohini", upon reaching they discover that cellphone towers are unavailable out there. They while away their days after reaching "Mohini" and enjoy themselves. Consequently, Amit gets infatuated with Polly, a village local girl. After a few days, Pramit and Amit meet with an old lady and her granddaughter Shompa, who miraculously looks exactly like one of the astrologer's wives. They both are left befuddled. As time passed by, Shompa begins to seduce Pramit and they both fall in love, which is the same in the case of Amit and Polly, in the meantime they begin to notice the oddity of the place's overly fluffy and amorous atmosphere. They 2 couples decide to marry and Pramit and Amit leave the hamlet with the intention of returning again, Amit asks Bhabenda how he knew that Amit and Pramit would arrive there, he replied that whenever there is a spinster or virgin, who has entered the age of marriage/partnership he always gets an intuition. Days pass on and they return to Najirpur, however they grow impatient and instead of waiting for Bhabenda, venture out themselves. They are unable to find the place and the locals claim that they've never heard of the existence of any place called "Mohini". Both being heartbroken return to Kolkata, upon returning, they to their utter astonishment they discover that the astrologer, Naren Shashmol and the whole Mallika family to be nonexistent. Amit finally decides to go back once again and wait for Bhabenda patiently but in the heat of the moment, Amit tells the driver to stop the car and he chases after a woman hurriedly, she seems to be urban judging by her apparel but when she turns back it bewilders Amit and Pramit as they get shocked by the revelation of her face being that of Shompa, as she smiles the screen fades to black and the movie title glows up meaning "rest is personal".

== Cast ==
- Ritwick Chakraborty
- Aparajita Ghosh Das
- Madhabi Mukherjee
- Churni Ganguly
- Monu Mukhopadhyay
- Sudipa Bose
- Debesh Raychowdhury
- Supriyo Dutta
- Amit Saha
- Arya Banerjee
- Koushik Roy

== Remake ==
Prasoon Sinha wants to remake the film in Hindi, where actor Ayushmann Khurrana will play the lead role.

== Criticism ==
The film is completely fresh in its approach which makes it different from other films.

== Sequel ==
Producer Satrajit Sen said he has a plan for a sequel to this film, where he wants Prosenjit Chatterjee to play a gangster.

== See more ==
- Birohi (web series)
