= Birohi (TV series) =

Bengali web series

- Genre: Comedy drama
- Directed by: Pradipta Bhattacharyya
- Music by: Satyaki Banerjee
- Country of origin: India
- Original language: Bengali
- No. of seasons: 1
- No. of episodes: 6

Production
- Producers: Ritwick Chakraborty; Pradipta Bhattacharyya
- Production company: One Eighty Degree

Original release
- Network: Uribaba
- Release: 10 September – 12 October 2021

Birohi is a Bengali-language streaming television series directed by Pradipta Bhattacharyya, the National award-winning director of Bakita Byaktigato released on the Uribaba OTT platform, the first independent free content station of West Bengal. This is the debut streaming series of director Bhattacharya and producer Ritwick Chakraborty. Media compared Birohi with the popular Hindi streaming series Panchayat. Season 2 of Birohi was released in December 2022.

== Plot ==
The story revolves around the life of a timid, unemployed person, Krishnakanta Haldar. He gets a primary school teacher job in a remote village of Birohi. It presents a hurdles-crossing journey of a teacher who faces the real features of rural Bengal: politics, love, and compassion.

== Cast ==
- Sayan Ghosh as Krishnakanta
- Satakshi Nandy as Radha
- Amit Saha as Tyapa Mondal
- Srabanti Bhattacharya as Jamidar
- Dipak Halder as Bom Bolai
- Anuradha Mukherjee as Kalpana
- Soham Maitra as Arun
- Nilay Samiran Nandi as Pokai
- Sk. Sahebul Haque as Ranjit

== Season 1 (2021) ==
The series' first season started streaming on 10 September 2021 with six episodes.

=== Episodes ===
No.	Title	Directed by	Original release date
1	"Episode 1"	Pradipta Bhattacharyya	10 September 2021
2	"Episode 2"	Pradipta Bhattacharyya	17 September 2021
3	"Episode 3"	Pradipta Bhattacharyya	24 September 2021
4	"Episode 4"	Pradipta Bhattacharyya	1 October 2021
5	"Episode 5"	Pradipta Bhattacharyya	6 October 2021
6	"Episode 6"	Pradipta Bhattacharyya	12 October 2021
