= Roopkala Kendro =

Film institute in Kolkata, India

- Type: Film school
- Established: April 2000
- Affiliations: Information and Cultural Affairs Government of West Bengal
- Location: Kolkata, West Bengal, India

Roopkala Kendro is a premier film and social communication institute in Kolkata, West Bengal, established in April 2000. As an autonomous body under the Department of Information and Cultural Affairs, Government of West Bengal, it focuses on training professionals in filmmaking while creating socially relevant media. It is a state run film and television institute that was set up on the initiative of veteran filmmaker Satyajit Ray.

== History ==
Roopkala Kendro was established in April 2000 as a registered society. It is a state run film and television institute that was set up on the initiative of veteran filmmaker Satyajit Ray. The institution was conceptualized through an Indo-Italian agreement signed in 1995, driven by noted film director Goutam Ghose and Italian film producer Sergio Scapagnini to produce social documentaries and foster media education.

== Academic programs ==
The institute offers a two-year Post Graduate Diploma in various specializations, adopting a "learning-by-doing" approach. Key departments include Direction, Motion Picture Photography, Editing, Sound Design, Animation Creation & Direction, Development Communication.

== Notable work ==
The institute has been associated with projects like Dreams Video Parlour (2017), Bodjaat (2019) and Uttoradhikar (2025)
