= 7 Khoon Maaf =

2011 Indian black comedy directed by Vishal Bhardwaj

- Theatrical release poster
- Directed by: Vishal Bhardwaj
- Screenplay by: Matthew Robbins; Vishal Bhardwaj
- Based on: "Susanna's Seven Husbands" by Ruskin Bond
- Produced by: Ronnie Screwvala; Vishal Bhardwaj
- Starring: Priyanka Chopra
- Narrated by: Vivaan Shah
- Cinematography: Ranjan Palit
- Edited by: A. Sreekar Prasad
- Music by: Vishal Bhardwaj
- Production companies: UTV Spotboy; VB Pictures
- Distributed by: UTV Motion Pictures
- Release date: 18 February 2011
- Running time: 147 minutes
- Country: India
- Language: Hindi
- Budget: ₹15 crore (US$1.6 million)
- Box office: ₹33 crore (US$3.4 million)

7 Khoon Maaf (transl. 7 Murders Forgiven; read as "Saat Khoon Maaf"), released internationally as Seven Sins Forgiven, is a 2011 Indian Hindi-language black comedy film directed, co-written and co-produced by Vishal Bhardwaj. The film stars Priyanka Chopra in the lead role, with Vivaan Shah, John Abraham, Neil Nitin Mukesh, Irrfan Khan, Alexander Dyachenko, Annu Kapoor, Naseeruddin Shah and Usha Uthup in supporting roles. The film tells the story of a femme fatale, Susanna Anna-Marie Johannes, an Anglo-Indian woman who causes six deaths in an unending quest for love. The story of Johannes is based on a real woman who lived in Bengal. Her grave is situated in Chuchura, district town of Hooghly,West Bengal.

7 Khoon Maaf is an adaptation of the short story "Susanna's Seven Husbands" by Ruskin Bond. After Bhardwaj saw the possibility of a script in the short story, he requested Bond to develop the story for a film adaptation. Bond expanded his 4-page short story into an 80-page novella, and later Bhardwaj co-wrote the script with Matthew Robbins. The film's musical score was composed by Bhardwaj, and Gulzar wrote the lyrics. Principal photography started in Kashmir before moving to Coorg, where extensive filming was done.

7 Khoon Maaf was released on 18 February 2011 to widespread critical acclaim, with major praise directed towards Chopra's performance. The film earned ₹33 crore (US$3.4 million) for its box-office run and television-music-home-video rights against a production budget of ₹15 crore (US$1.6 million). It premiered at the 61st Berlin International Film Festival, receiving several accolades at award ceremonies across India.

At the 57th Filmfare Awards, 7 Khoon Maaf received 4 nominations, and won 2 awards – Best Actress (Critics) (Chopra) and Best Female Playback Singer (Usha Uthup and Rekha Bhardwaj for "Darling").

== Plot ==
=== Prologue ===
7 Khoon Maaf tells the story of an Anglo-Indian woman, Susanna Anna-Marie Johannes (Priyanka Chopra), who murders all her husbands. Susanna tries to find love, but each time of the six of seven times, her husband's flaws prove fatal. The story is narrated by Arun Kumar (Vivaan Shah), a forensic pathologist to his wife, Nandini (Konkona Sen Sharma). Arun has known Susanna, who was his rich benefactor, since his childhood, and had a secret crush on her. Susanna had lost her mother as an infant and her father some years later. Her parents had left her with a large inheritance and it was her father's last wish that she marry Major Edwin Rodriques.

=== Army Major Edwin (Allegory of Envy) ===
Susanna's first husband, Edwin Rodriques (Neil Nitin Mukesh), is an army major who is jealous and possessive. Disabled after losing a leg, he suspects that the beautiful Susanna will be unfaithful and takes out his anger on her. Although Susanna tolerates Edwin's cruelty, she cannot forgive him for blinding her faithful, mute stableboy, Goonga Chacha (Shashi Malviya) with a whip. Edwin ends up becoming the animal's meal during a panther-hunting trip when Susanna pushes him over with the help of her faithful maid Maggie Aunty (Usha Uthup), butler Galib Khan (Harish Khanna), and the stableboy Goonga Chacha.

=== Singer Jimmy (Allegory of Gluttony) ===
Susanna's second husband, Jamshed Singh Rathod (John Abraham), who renames himself Jimmy Stetson after their marriage, is a singer whose flaw is his gluttony. Jimmy becomes successful and misuses his fame – stealing songs and dalliances with other women and doing drugs. Susanna tries to wean him from his addiction, but when he continues in secret, he is disposed of with a heroin overdose by one of Susanna's faithful servants. Police investigators find footprints near his body, indicating that a person with six toes is the murderer but Susanna uses her charm to deflect suspicion.

=== Poet Wasiullah (Allegory of Wrath) ===
Susanna's third husband, Mohammed Wasiullah Khan (also known as Musafir) (Irrfan Khan), is a soft-spoken, thoughtful poet by day and a sado-masochist by night, who tortures Susanna in bed. Susanna tries to cover her bruises, but her servants cannot bear to see her mistreated. One fateful night, Susanna seduces Khan and leads him out into the snow where he is ultimately buried alive in a snowy Kashmiri grave by Maggie and Galib Khan.

=== Nik the Spy (Allegory of Pride) ===
Her fourth husband, Nikolai Vronsky (Alexander Dyachenko), is a Russian spy leading a double life, who is enchanted by her. Even though she initially declines his desire to marry and says that she just wants to stay in love, she decides to test her luck once more and agrees to marry him. She sends Arun to a medical university in Russia to complete his studies. Alas, Arun finds Nikolai in Russia with his first wife and 2 daughters and sends secretly captured pictures of them to Susanna, which he regrets later as he holds himself responsible for Nikolai's imminent death. Susanna also discovers a document which confirms her suspicion that he is a spy, something he had denied earlier. When she confronts him, he tries to cover it up by saying that the woman he was with in Russia was his fellow agent. Susanna refuses to believe him. She then proceeds to throw the document in a well in which she houses her pet snakes. Nikolai unknowingly enters the well in the hope of recovering the document, and meets his inevitable death.

=== Inspector Keemat (Allegory of Lust) ===
Her fifth husband, Keemat Lal (Annu Kapoor), is a police inspector who has shielded her from prosecution in exchange for sexual favors. Keemat Lal had protected her from being prosecuted for the murder of Nik in exchange for Nik's document and a sexual favour but he continued to come to Susanna for sexual intercourse. Susanna then marries him after his first wife gives him a divorce, but only with the intention of disposing of him for good. His dependence on Viagra then proves his undoing; one fateful night, Susanna mixes an overdose of the drug into Lal's drink, killing him. At this point, Arun returns from Russia as a doctor. When Susanna tries to seduce him, Arun leaves her, taking Goonga with him. It is the last straw for Susanna when she learns that Arun is now married to Nandini and has a son; and attempts to commit suicide with an overdose of sleeping pills.

=== Doctor Modhu (Allegory of Greed) ===
Modhusudhon Tarafdar (Naseeruddin Shah) is a Bengali doctor who rescues Susanna from her suicide attempt and puts her on a mushroom-only diet. Although she does not want to marry him, he persuades her with a promise that she will be the sole heir of his property as he does not want his ex-wife and daughter to be able to claim it in the case of his death. Actually bankrupt, he tries to poison her in his greed for her inheritance. When her butler Galib dies of the poison mushrooms instead, Susanna shoots Tarafdar during a game of Russian roulette.

=== Maggie Aunty (Allegory of Loyalty) ===
In despair, Susanna then sets the house ablaze in another suicide attempt as sleeping pills had already failed her once, she had forgotten the bullets beside Dr. Modhu’s corpse during their game of Russian Roulette and did not approve of a death by hanging. But as the fire reaches her bedroom, she changes her mind and flees the burning mansion. Her maid, Maggie Aunty dies in the attempt to rescue Susanna.

=== Jesus Christ (Allegory of Perfect Love) ===
Some time later, Arun's wife Nandini finds out that Arun lied about his whereabouts and suspects that he is cheating on her with Susanna. In the forensics laboratory, Arun discovers that the body is Maggie Aunty's and not Susanna's but declares her dead to return her favour of educating him. He goes to Pondicherry looking for Susanna. They drink together and Susanna tells him that she is getting married once more and invites him to the wedding the next day. It is later revealed that Susanna decided to become a nun, in effect making Jesus Christ - representation of love and kindness – her seventh and final husband. She then confesses her seven sins to the church father (Ruskin Bond) and feels at peace.

=== Epilogue ===
Meanwhile, Nandini panics when Arun doesn't return in 2 days as he had promised and alerts the police. They set out on a search for him. Nandini finally reunites with Arun and he assures her that Susanna is dead and that the feelings he had for her are long gone and promises never to leave Nandini again.

== Cast ==
- Priyanka Chopra as Susanna Anna-Marie Johannes (also known as Saheb, Suzi, Sultana, Anna and Sunaina)
  - Ishita Pancal as Young Suzanna (picture, uncredited)
- Vivaan Shah as Dr. Arun Kumar
  - Ayush Tandon as young Arun
- Neil Nitin Mukesh as Major Edwin Rodriques (first husband)
- John Abraham as Jamshed Singh Rathod aka Jimmy Stetson (second husband)
- Irrfan Khan as Wasiullah Khan (also known as Musafir) (third husband)
- Alexander Dyachenko as Nikolai Vronsky (fourth husband)
- Annu Kapoor as Inspector Keemat Lal (fifth husband)
- Naseeruddin Shah as Dr. Modhusudhon Tarafdar (also known as Modhu Daa) (sixth husband)
- Usha Uthup as Maggie Aunty (maid)
- Harish Khanna as Galib Khan (butler)
- Shashi Malviya as Goonga Chacha (stableboy)
- Konkona Sen Sharma as Nandini, Arun's wife (cameo)
- Ruskin Bond as church father (in a cameo appearance)
- Vidushi Mehra as Chetna

== Production ==
=== Development ===
The idea for 7 Khoon Maaf came when Ruskin Bond sent his book consisting of a collection of short stories to Vishal Bhardwaj. He was intrigued by a 4-page story's title named "Susanna's Seven Husbands", and thought it had potential for a novel and a film. Bhardwaj said, "I told myself why would a woman have seven husbands and then I came to know that she also kills them! I was immediately hooked to it. It reminded me of a very old film, Bluebeard's Seven Wives (1926)". Bhardwaj suggested the story to a fellow director, who was looking for a good story. However, after reading the short story, the director dismissed it saying it has no film potential. After reading the story twice, he became even more confident about possibility of a film. Bhardwaj who had previously adapted Bond's novel The Blue Umbrella into a film, decided to adapt the short story for the screen. Bhardwaj later requested Bond to turn the story into a novella, noting that only Bond could flesh out the characters well, to which he agreed. Bond expanded the story into an 80-page novella, which later became a 200-page full-length Hindi script. Bhardwaj co-wrote the script with Matthew Robbins.

Bhardwaj noted that he retained Bond's theme, but incorporated his own elements to make the film a dark comedy. He said, "I had previously taken liberties with Shakespeare. Naturally, when you adapt a story, your vision also comes in it. But I have remained honest to its essence". He included Keemat Lal (who plays a police officer in all Bond's stories), although the character is not in the original story. Bhardwaj decided to include him in the film as an homage to Bond, explaining that he took liberties with characters' names and traits. Bond also had to devise Indian methods of killing the husbands, which he found challenging: "The challenge was devising seven ingenious ways in which she could kill her husbands without being suspected. And she does it successfully, until towards the end".

=== Casting and characters ===
Priyanka Chopra was Bhardwaj's original choice for the role of Susanna after he worked with the actress in Kaminey (2009): He said that Chopra "is the finest actor of her generation right now... As a director I had so much trust on her that I felt that no one else can essay this role as brilliantly as she would do". Mohanlal was cast as one of Susanna's husbands in the film; however, he left the project to concentrate on Malayalam films. The actor was replaced by Annu Kapoor in the role of Inspector Keemat Lal. Pakistani actor Shamoon Abbasi and Ali Azmat offered to play two of the husband's role. However, They refused to do so due to the shooting of Pakistani film Waar (2013). John Abraham, Naseeruddin Shah, Neil Nitin Mukesh and Vivaan Shah were also cast in pivotal supporting roles. Directors Karan Johar and Imtiaz Ali were approached to play 2 of the seven husbands, but they reportedly turned down the offer. Usha Uthup was cast as Susanna's maid in the film. Konkona Sen Sharma was confirmed for a cameo appearance.

During production, the film underwent 2 name changes. The project was initially titled Seven, which became Ek Bataa Saat, and finally 7 Khoon Maaf. In the film, Chopra's character ages from 20 to 65, and prosthetic makeup was used for her looks at different ages. Bhardwaj hired Hollywood special makeup effects artist Greg Cannom, who did the makeup for The Curious Case of Benjamin Button (2008) to create seven looks for the character. Chopra found the most challenging period was that of the 65-year-old woman. The actress said, "prosthetics had to play a heavy part but I’m happy that I pushed myself as the result is really fab. I had to be very careful of not doing things that would damage the make-up". To make Chopra look authentic, the makeup team used Chopra's mother's and grandmother's photos to create her look. She had to gain 5 kg weight to fit her aging character.

=== Filming ===
Principal photography began in March 2010 with Chopra and Irrfan Khan in Kashmir. Locations included Shalimar Bagh and Dal Lake in Srinagar. The cast and crew were provided with 2-tier security coverage by the Central Reserve Police Force (CRPF) and the Jammu & Kashmir Police, due to unrest in the valley. The film was also shot in Gulmarg, Delhi and Coorg, which included extensive shooting in the forests. Other locations were Puducherry, Mumbai, Hyderabad and in Russia. During filming Chopra was restricted from eating and drinking while donning the prosthetic makeup (which took 5 hours to apply).

== Soundtrack ==
The film's score and songs were composed by Vishal Bhardwaj, with lyrics by Gulzar. Its soundtrack contains seven songs and 2 reprise versions. The soundtrack was digitally released via Ovi (Nokia) internet service on 24 January 2011, and via CD on 25 January 2011. The song "Darling" is based on the Russian folk song "Kalinka", and contains several Russian words (one of Susanna's husbands was Russian). "Kalinka" is credited on the album cover. "Tere Liye", sung by Suresh Wadkar, was not used in the film.

== Marketing and release ==
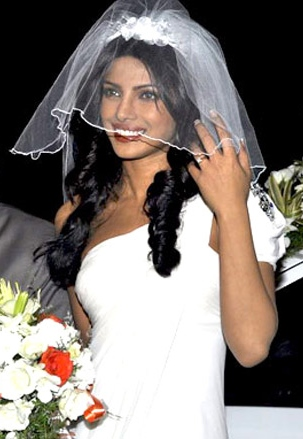
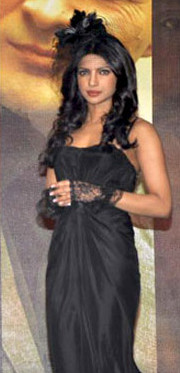
The succession of marriage and funeral was illustrated at a promotional event

The film's preview and trailer were released on 24 December 2010 to a positive response from critics, who praised the whole presentation and Chopra's dialogues particularly: "Duniya ki har biwi ne kabhie na kabhie toh yeh zarur socha hoga, ki main apne pati se hamesha hamesha ke liye chutkara kaise paun" ("Every wife in the entire world must have once in her lifetime thought of how to get rid of her husband forever"). Following the preview-trailer launches, Chopra promoted the film by appearing with seven men (dressed as bridegrooms) at the Radio Mirchi FM studio. The succession of marriages and funerals was illustrated at a promotional event for the film, where Chopra appeared as a Catholic bride in a wedding gown holding a bouquet. A short time later she reappeared as a widow in mourning, for her husbands' funerals.

Emphasizing the film's theme, Chopra introduced a "seven ways to lose your Valentine" press kit for reporters at a Valentine's Day promotion. The kit contained a rope, a syringe, a knife, a bottle of poison, a sachet of potassium cyanide, an ice pick and a blister pack of Viagra, which was based on Susanna's way to kill her husbands in the film. In February 2011, a book entitled Susanna's Seven Husbands was released by Penguin Books as a collector's edition including the novella, the short story and the film's screenplay.

The film was screened at the 61st Berlin International Film Festival as part of its world premiere in the festival's Panorama section. At the Friedrichstadt Palace (a Berlin theatre) an audience of some 2,500 people watched the film on the festival's final evening, giving the director and the nine cast and crew members present a standing ovation when they appeared onstage. 7 Khoon Maaf was originally scheduled for release on 21 January 2011, but was postponed a month to avoid conflicting with the Aamir Khan-starrer Dhobi Ghat. The film was released on 18 February 2011 on about 700 screens across India. Reliance Home Entertainment released 7 Khoon Maaf on DVD in March 2011 across all regions in a one-disc NTSC format. The Blu-ray and Video CD versions were released at the same time.

Indiagames, a subsidiary of UTV, also released a tie-in mobile video game to accompany the film's release.

== Critical reception ==
7 Khoon Maaf received widespread critical acclaim upon release. Aniruddha Guha of the Daily News and Analysis rated the film a 4 (out of 5) and wrote, "For a filmmaker who has long established his hold over the craft, 7 Khoon Maaf is the only way forward – it pushes the envelope and takes you on a cinematic journey you may not experience in a Hindi film for a long time to come". She praised Chopra's performance: "Priyanka Chopra takes on a character that most of her contemporaries would shy away from and enacts it in a way that only she possibly can. For a woman with as many shades as Susanna, Chopra gets a crack at a role of a lifetime. And Bhardwaj ensures she sparkles like never before". The Indo-Asian News Service described the film as a "winner" by Vishal Bhardwaj, rating it 4 out of 5: "Chalk up an absolute winner for the Vishal Bhardwaj-Priyanka Chopra team. They make a coherent vision out of an inconceivable marital crises." Zee News also rated the film 4 out of 5: "Vishal Bhardwaj does it again. The maverick filmmaker has once again woven magic with his latest blockbuster Saat Khoon Maaf, which presents Priyanka Chopra in a never before character".

Nikhat Kazmi of the Times of India gave the film a 3.5 (out of 5) rating, describing it as "serious, sensitive and stirring", "a whole new cinematic experience" and praising Chopra's performance: "7 Khoon Maaf would undoubtedly end up as a milestone in Priyanka Chopra's career graph. The actor displays exquisite command over a complex character that is definitely a first in Indian cinema. She renders a subtle and restrained portrayal of a lonely and wronged woman who wanted love and only love from life". Mayank Shekhar of the Hindustan Times gave 7 Khoon Maaf 3 out of 5 stars noting that the film was crafted around strong, effective scenes alone: a lot of them, cleanly cut and clinical, a whole lot immediately compelling, and recommended not to miss the partly captivating film Taran Adarsh of Bollywood Hungama gave the film 3 stars, saying that "7 Khoon Maaf is a dark film that has its share of positives and negatives. However, the film will meet with diverse reactions – some will fancy it, while some will abhor it. The film will appeal more to the critics/columnists and the festival circuit".

== Box office ==
At the box office, the film opened to weak ticket sales across India (its release coincided with the 2011 Cricket World Cup). It grossed ₹14 crore (US$1.5 million) during its first week. By the end of its domestic box office run, the film earned approximately ₹20 crore (US$2.1 million), an underperformance compared to its production budget of ₹15 crore (US$1.6 million). It made an additional ₹13 crore (US$1.3 million) from the pre-release sale of music, television, and home video rights. Its producers reported that the venture was commercially successful. Siddharth Roy Kapur (CEO of UTV Motion Pictures) said, "7 Khoon Maaf has worked well for us commercially due to a combination of tight production budgeting, optimized spending on prints and publicity and a pre-sales strategy that helped us to de-risk the film via sales of home video, music, satellite and theatrical rights even before the release".

== Accolades ==
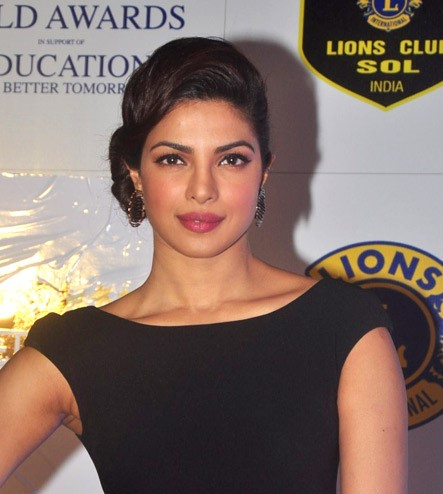
Priyanka Chopra received widespread critical acclaim and numerous accolades for her performance in the film.

7 Khoon Maaf received a number of nominations and won several awards, with Chopra winning most of her Best Actress nominations. It received 4 nominations at the 57th Filmfare Awards, and won 2 awards: Best Actress (Critics) (Chopra) and Best Female Playback Singer (Usha Uthup and Rekha Bhardwaj for "Darling"). At the 2012 Screen Awards, the film received 5 nominations, and Chopra won Best Actor in a Negative Role. At the 2012 Producers Guild Film Awards, 7 Khoon Maaf received 6 nominations, and won 3 awards: Best Cinematography, Best Art Direction and Best Costume Design.

Award	Date of ceremony (Note: Date is linked to the article about the awards held that year, wherever possible.)	Category	Recipient(s) and nominee(s)	Result	Ref(s)
BIG Star Entertainment Awards	18 December 2011	Most Entertaining Film Actor – Female	Priyanka Chopra	Nominated	
Filmfare Awards	29 January 2012	Best Actress	Priyanka Chopra	Nominated	
Filmfare Awards	29 January 2012	Best Actress (Critics)	Priyanka Chopra	Won	
Filmfare Awards	29 January 2012	Best Lyricist	Gulzar (for "Darling")	Nominated	
Filmfare Awards	29 January 2012	Best Female Playback Singer	Rekha Bhardwaj & Usha Uthup (for "Darling")	Won	
Global Indian Music Academy Awards	1 October 2012	Best Lyricist	Gulzar (for "Darling")	Nominated	
Global Indian Music Academy Awards	1 October 2012	Best Female Playback Singer	Rekha Bhardwaj & Usha Uthup (for "Darling")	Nominated	
International Indian Film Academy Awards	9 June 2012	Best Actress	Priyanka Chopra	Nominated	
International Indian Film Academy Awards	9 June 2012	Best Performance in a Negative Role	Irrfan Khan	Nominated	
International Indian Film Academy Awards	9 June 2012	Best Music Director	Vishal Bharadwaj	Nominated	
International Indian Film Academy Awards	9 June 2012	Best Lyricist	Gulzar (for song "Darling")	Nominated	
International Indian Film Academy Awards	9 June 2012	Best Playback Singer – Female	Rekha Bhardwaj & Usha Uthup (for "Darling")	Nominated	
Producers Guild Film Awards (Note: Also known as Apsara Film & Television Producers Guild Award.)	25 January 2012	Best Actress in a Leading Role	Priyanka Chopra	Nominated	
Producers Guild Film Awards	25 January 2012	Entertainer of the Year	Priyanka Chopra	Won (Note: Also for Don 2.)	
Producers Guild Film Awards	25 January 2012	Best Lyricist	Gulzar	Nominated	
Producers Guild Film Awards	25 January 2012	Best Cinematography	Ranjan Palit	Won	
Producers Guild Film Awards	25 January 2012	Best Art Direction	Subrata Chakraborty & Punita Grover	Won	
Producers Guild Film Awards	25 January 2012	Best Costume Design	Payal Saluja	Won	
Producers Guild Film Awards	25 January 2012	Best Choreography	Raju Sundaram	Nominated	
Screen Awards	15 January 2012	Best Actress	Priyanka Chopra	Nominated	
Screen Awards	15 January 2012	Best Actor in a Negative Role	Priyanka Chopra	Won	
Screen Awards	15 January 2012	Best Supporting Actor	Neil Nitin Mukesh	Nominated	
Screen Awards	15 January 2012	Best Female Playback Singer	Rekha Bhardwaj & Usha Uthup (for "Darling")	Nominated	
Screen Awards	15 January 2012	Best Choreography	Sandeep Suparkar (for "Darling")	Nominated	
Stardust Awards	25 February 2012	Star of the Year	Priyanka Chopra	Nominated	
Stardust Awards	25 February 2012	Best Actress – Drama	Priyanka Chopra	Nominated	
Zee Cine Awards	22 January 2012	Best Actor – Female	Priyanka Chopra	Nominated	
Mirchi Music Awards	21 March 2012	Female Vocalist of The Year	Rekha Bhardwaj & Usha Uthup (for "Darling")	Nominated	
Mirchi Music Awards	21 March 2012	Best Song Recording	"Awaara"	Nominated	

== See also ==
- Seven deadly sins
- Haft Peykar
- Hasht-Bihisht
- Bluebeard
