= Banikhet Assembly constituency =

Former Legislative Assembly constituency in Himachal Pradesh, India

Coordinates: 32.55°N 75.94°E

Banikhet
- Former constituency for the Himachal Pradesh Legislative Assembly

Constituency details
- Country: India
- Region: North India
- State: Himachal Pradesh
- District: Chamba
- Lok Sabha constituency: Kangra
- Established: 1967
- Abolished: 2012
- Reservation: None

Banikhet was one of the 68 assembly constituencies of Himachal Pradesh a northern Indian state. Banikhet was also part of Kangra Lok Sabha constituency.

== Member of Legislative Assembly ==
Election	Member	Party
1967	Des Raj	Indian National Congress
1972	Des Raj	Indian National Congress
1977	Gian Chand	Janata Party
1982	Des Raj	Indian National Congress
1985	Asha Kumari	Indian National Congress
1990	Gandharv Singh	Bharatiya Janata Party
1993	Asha Kumari	Indian National Congress
1998	Asha Kumari	Indian National Congress
2003	Asha Kumari	Indian National Congress
2007	Renu Chadha	Bharatiya Janata Party

== Election results ==
=== Assembly Election 2007 ===
2007 Himachal Pradesh Legislative Assembly election: Banikhet
Party	Candidate	Votes	%	±%
BJP	Renu Chadha	28,310	48.87%	▲3.31
INC	Asha Kumari	26,245	45.31%	▼1.93
BSP	Loki Nand Sharma	3,339	5.76%	New
Margin of victory		2,065	3.56%	▲1.90
Turnout		57,925	74.13%	▲0.62
Registered electors		78,136		▲11.43
BJP gain from INC		Swing		

=== Assembly Election 2003 ===
2003 Himachal Pradesh Legislative Assembly election: Banikhet
Party	Candidate	Votes	%	±%
INC	Asha Kumari	24,348	47.24%	▼1.86
BJP	Renu Chadha	23,488	45.57%	▼2.61
CPI	Rajender Kumar	1,266	2.46%	▲0.36
Independent	Bias Dev	1,021	1.98%	New
HVC	Shaukat Ali	644	1.25%	▲0.61
SP	Hem Raj	475	0.92%	New
Independent	Bodh Raj Rana	304	0.59%	New
Margin of victory		860	1.67%	▲0.75
Turnout		51,546	73.59%	▲3.41
Registered electors		70,122		▲7.20
INC hold		Swing	▼1.86	

=== Assembly Election 1998 ===
1998 Himachal Pradesh Legislative Assembly election: Banikhet
Party	Candidate	Votes	%	±%
INC	Asha Kumari	22,509	49.09%	▲0.59
BJP	Renu Chadha	22,088	48.17%	▲13.41
CPI	Daulat Ram Nirdoshi	963	2.10%	▼14.64
HVC	Hem Raj	291	0.63%	New
Margin of victory		421	0.92%	▼12.82
Turnout		45,851	70.85%	▲1.95
Registered electors		65,412		▲13.33
INC hold		Swing	▲0.59	

=== Assembly Election 1993 ===
1993 Himachal Pradesh Legislative Assembly election: Banikhet
Party	Candidate	Votes	%	±%
INC	Asha Kumari	19,079	48.50%	▲14.82
BJP	Gandharv Singh	13,673	34.76%	▼3.75
CPI	Daulat Ram Nirdoshi	6,584	16.74%	▼9.53
Margin of victory		5,406	13.74%	▲8.92
Turnout		39,336	68.66%	▲12.09
Registered electors		57,720		▲4.17
INC gain from BJP		Swing		

=== Assembly Election 1990 ===
1990 Himachal Pradesh Legislative Assembly election: Banikhet
Party	Candidate	Votes	%	±%
BJP	Gandharv Singh	11,962	38.51%	▲24.18
INC	Asha Kumari	10,464	33.69%	▼16.66
CPI	Daulat Ram Nirdoshi	8,158	26.26%	▲5.81
Independent	Janki Nath	165	0.53%	New
Margin of victory		1,498	4.82%	▼25.07
Turnout		31,062	56.34%	▼4.10
Registered electors		55,412		▲30.19
BJP gain from INC		Swing	▼11.84	

=== Assembly Election 1985 ===
1985 Himachal Pradesh Legislative Assembly election: Banikhet
Party	Candidate	Votes	%	±%
INC	Asha Kumari	12,891	50.35%	▲0.44
CPI	Daulat Ram Nirdoshi	5,236	20.45%	▼3.80
Independent	Bimla Mahajan	3,808	14.87%	New
BJP	Gandharv Singh	3,670	14.33%	▼6.09
Margin of victory		7,655	29.90%	▲4.25
Turnout		25,605	60.56%	▼2.17
Registered electors		42,561		▲4.54
INC hold		Swing	▲0.44	

=== Assembly Election 1982 ===
1982 Himachal Pradesh Legislative Assembly election: Banikhet
Party	Candidate	Votes	%	±%
INC	Des Raj	12,663	49.90%	▲21.23
CPI	Daulat Ram Nirdoshi	6,154	24.25%	New
BJP	Gian Chand	5,183	20.42%	New
JP	Gandharv Singh	683	2.69%	▼64.11
Independent	Bhagat Ram	387	1.53%	New
LKD	Pritam Singh	240	0.95%	New
Margin of victory		6,509	25.65%	▼12.48
Turnout		25,376	63.02%	▲7.37
Registered electors		40,711		▲12.94
INC gain from JP		Swing	▼16.90	

=== Assembly Election 1977 ===
1977 Himachal Pradesh Legislative Assembly election: Banikhet
Party	Candidate	Votes	%	±%
JP	Gian Chand	13,235	66.80%	New
INC	Des Raj	5,681	28.67%	▼46.72
Independent	Prithvi Raj	532	2.69%	New
Independent	Mohan Singh	365	1.84%	New
Margin of victory		7,554	38.13%	▼19.89
Turnout		19,813	55.58%	▲9.43
Registered electors		36,048		▲27.81
JP gain from INC		Swing	▼8.59	

=== Assembly Election 1972 ===
1972 Himachal Pradesh Legislative Assembly election: Banikhet
Party	Candidate	Votes	%	±%
INC	Des Raj	9,682	75.39%	▲22.05
Independent	Jagdish Mitter	2,231	17.37%	New
ABJS	Daulat Ram Nirdoshi	929	7.23%	▼34.67
Margin of victory		7,451	58.02%	▲46.58
Turnout		12,842	46.59%	▲2.82
Registered electors		28,205		▲15.50
INC hold		Swing		

=== Assembly Election 1967 ===
1967 Himachal Pradesh Legislative Assembly election: Banikhet
Party	Candidate	Votes	%	±%
INC	Des Raj	5,564	53.34%	New
ABJS	Gian Chand	4,371	41.90%	New
CPI(M)	M. Singh	496	4.76%	New
Margin of victory		1,193	11.44%	
Turnout		10,431	44.19%	
Registered electors		24,420		
INC win (new seat)				

== See also ==
- Banikhet
- Chamba district
- Kangra (Lok Sabha constituency)
