= Dyachenko =

Dyachenko is a Ukrainian surname (Russian: Дьяченко, Ukrainian: Д'яченко, also Diachenko). Notable people with the surname include:

- Alex M. Diachenko (1919–1943), United States Navy sailor and Silver Star recipient
- Alexander Dyachenko (canoeist)
- Alexander Dyachenko (actor)
- Alexandr Dyachenko, Kazakhstani beach volleyball player
- Alexsandr Dyachenko, Kazakh road bicycle racer
- Fedir Dyachenko (1917–1995), Hero of the Soviet Union
- Darya Dyachenko (1924–1944), partisan and Hero of the Soviet Union
- Maryna and Serhiy Dyachenko (born 1968 and 1945–2022), Ukrainian sci-fi writers
- Olena Diachenko (born 2001), Ukrainian rhythmic gymnast
- Petro Dyachenko (1895–1965), Ukrainian military commander
- Rod Dyachenko (born 1983), Russian soccer player
- Ernest Dyachenko (born 2007) Ukrainian,Israeli Music Artist and a producer
- Tatyana Dyachenko (born 1960), daughter of Boris Yeltsin

== See also ==
- Diachenko (disambiguation)
