= Alexander Dyachenko =

Alexander Dyachenko, in various spellings, may refer to:

- Alex M. Diachenko (1919–1943), United States Navy sailor and Silver Star recipient
- Alexander Dyachenko (canoeist)
- Alexander Dyachenko (actor)
- Alexandr Dyachenko, Kazakhstani beach volleyball player
- Alexsandr Dyachenko, Kazakh road bicycle racer
