= Gandharv Singh =

Indian politician (c.1932–2019)

Himachal Pradesh Legislative Assembly
- In office 1990–1993
- Preceded by: Asha Kumari
- Succeeded by: Asha Kumari
- Constituency: Banikhet

Personal details
- Born: c. 1932
- Died: 9 December 2019 (aged 87)

Gandharv Singh (c. 1932 – 9 December 2019) was an Indian politician from Himachal Pradesh. He was a legislator of the Himachal Pradesh Legislative Assembly.

== Biography ==
Singh was elected as a legislator of the Himachal Pradesh Legislative Assembly from Banikhet in 1990 as a Bharatiya Janata Party candidate.

Singh decided to take part in the 2012 Himachal Pradesh Legislative Assembly election as a Bharatiya Janata Party candidate from Bhattiyat. But he was not nominated and Bikram Singh Jariyal was nominated instead of him. He became angry with Bharatiya Janata Party and sat on hunger strike. Later, he quit the party and joined Indian National Congress.

Singh died on 9 December 2019 at the age of 87.
