= Diachenko =

Diachenko may refer to:

- Diachenko or Dyachenko, a surname of Ukrainian origin
  - Alex M. Diachenko (1919–1943), United States Navy sailor and Silver Star recipient
  - Olena Diachenko (born 2001), Ukrainian rhythmic gymnast
- USS Diachenko, a United States Navy high-speed transport in commission from 1944 to 1959 and from 1961 to 1969
