= Renu Chadha =

Indian politician

Renu Chadha is an Indian politician and member of the Bharatiya Janata Party. Chadha was a member of the Himachal Pradesh Legislative Assembly from the Banikhet constituency in Chamba district.
