= Our Trees Still Grow in Dehra =

Book by Ruskin Bond

- First edition
- Author: Ruskin Bond
- Language: English
- Genre: Short stories
- Published: 1991
- Publisher: Penguin India
- Publication place: India
- ISBN: 9780140169027
- OCLC: 26361931

Our Trees Still Grow in Dehra is a collection of fourteen semi-autobiographical stories written by Ruskin Bond. The book largely discusses the author's childhood experiences in Dehradun, India, although the setting differs between stories. It was published in 1991. In recognition of this book, Bond was awarded the Sahitya Academy Award in 1992.

== Summaries ==
As this is a publication of several independent short stories, several distinct and largely unrelated plots occur in each.

Escape from Java is war fiction about a nine year old boy's escape from the island of Java during the Japanese invasion, sometime during World War II.

The Bent-Double Beggar revolves around the narrator's encounter with Genpat, a beggar with a crooked back. He provides a story for what gave him the disability, as well as an assorted collection of proverbial teachings.

Untouchable is a very short account of a ten year old boy's fear of insects and a brief moment of friendship he shares with an "untouchable". Bond wrote this story when he was sixteen.

== Reception ==
As per India Today, "Like Dom Moraes, Bond is completely at ease with British-English idiom: he describes descending train passengers as 'debouching'. Yet his precise and reflective prose is closer to Jim Corbett's in being more homegrown: he speaks of khuds, langurs and rustic Pahadi friends."
