= The Room on the Roof =

1956 book by Ruskin Bond

- 1987 edition cover
- Author: Ruskin Bond
- Original title: The Room on the Roof
- Cover artist: Clarf Bishop Dean
- Language: English
- Series: Ruskin's famous Novels
- Genre: Fiction
- Publisher: Coward-McCann (original); Penguin Books (current)
- Publication date: 1956
- Publication place: India
- Media type: Paperback
- Pages: 184 pages (first edition)
- ISBN: 0140107835
- OCLC: 1579534
- Preceded by: N/A
- Followed by: Vagrants in the Valley

The Room on the Roof is a novel written by Ruskin Bond.

It was Bond's first literary venture. Bond wrote the novel when he was seventeen and won the John Llewellyn Rhys Prize in 1957. The novel revolves around Rusty, an orphaned sixteen-year-old Anglo-Indian boy living in Dehradun. Due to his guardian Mr Harrison's strict ways, he runs away from his home to live with his Indian friends.

== Summary ==
This is a story about an orphaned boy named Rusty, of Anglo-Indian descent, living in a European colony in Dehra (a place in Uttarakhand) with his guardian Mr. Harrison and the missionary's wife, who wanted him to stay away from Indians and groom him as a pure Englishman. However, in this process, Harrison’s stringent behavior perturbs Rusty’s flourishing teenage years. While walking home in the rain, he was offered help by Somi and Ranbir who go on to become his friends. Rusty is unhappy with his life at his guardian's house and longs for freedom.

He runs away from his home and lives with his friend Somi, who gets him a job as an English teacher for Kishen (Mr.Kapoor's son). At Mr.Kapoor's house, he is given a room on the roof. Mr.Kapoor is a drunkard, who has a beautiful wife, Meena Kapoor. Rusty and Meena fall in love with each other. On the way to Delhi, Meena dies in a car crash. Kishen is sent to stay with his aunt and Mr.Kapoor remarries. Rusty decides to leave India and go to England as none of his friends remain in Dehra. He decides to visit Kishen before leaving for England. In Haridwar, he learns that Kishen has run away from home and become a thief. He meets Kishen and they both leave for Dehra, where Kishen plans on opening a chaat shop and making Rusty an English professor.

== Characters ==
- Rusty: an orphan boy
- Mr John Harrison: A strict guardian of Rusty
- The Missionary's wife
- Kishen: Mr. Kapoor's Son and Rusty's friend.
- Mrs Meena Kapoor: Kishen's mother
- Mr Kapoor: Kishen's father
- Somi: A Sikh boy, Rusty's friend and a partner
- Ranbir: A muscular boy and the best wrestler in the bazaar.
- Suri: A bespectacled and bony boy and Somi's friend, known for his reputation as a spy.
- Prickly Heat: Suri's dog
- Sweeper boy

== Reception ==
Upon release, the book received positive reviews. Santha Rama Rau of The New York Times commented "Like an Indian bazaar itself, the book is filled with the smells, sights, sounds, confusion and subtle organization of ordinary Indian life". Herald Tribune said that the book "has a special magic of its own". San Francisco Chronicle said that the book has "considerable charm and spontaneity".

The Guardian called the book "very engaging". The Scotsman commented "Moving in its simplicity and underlying tenderness...a novel of marked originality". The New Statesman said that "Mr Bond is a writer of great gifts". The Hindu said that "Bond so picturesquely draws the contrast from the stark and claustrophobic English part of town with the noise, colour and vibrancy of the Indian quarter. This is a touching story of love and friendship".

The first official Bengali version of Ruskin Bond's The Room on the Roof has been translated by Partha Pratim Das and published by Book Farm in 2022 as "Chilekothar Ghar".
