= The Sensualist (novella) =

Novella by Ruskin Bond

The Sensualist: a cautionary tale is a novella by the Anglo-Indian author Ruskin Bond which created a controversy when it was charged with obscenity in Mumbai. It was first serialized in 1974 in the Mumbai-based magazine Debonair. In 1996, it was included in Strangers in the Night : Two Novellas, published by Penguin. That volume was translated into Hindi and included in the anthology of his fiction.
