= Ruskin Bond =

Indian novelist and short story writer (born 1934)

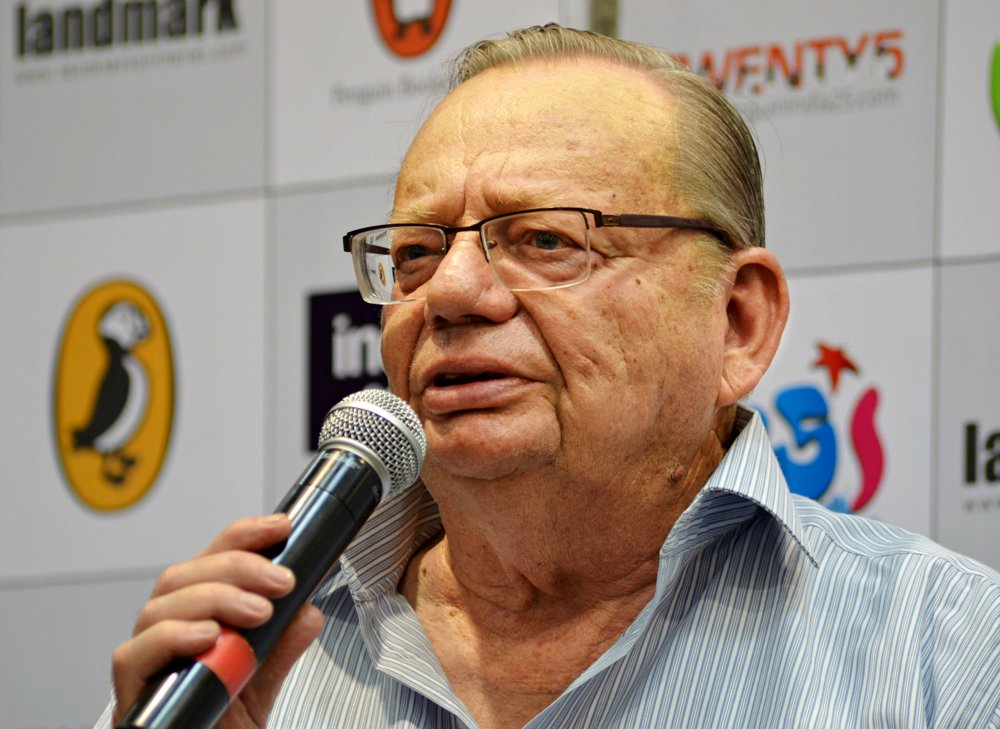
- Bond in 2012
- Born: 19 May 1934 (age 92); Kasauli, Punjab States Agency, British India (now in Himachal Pradesh, India)
- Education: Bishop Cotton School
- Occupations: Author; poet
- Relatives: Edith Dorothy Clarke (mother); Aubrey Alexander Bond (father); Ellen Bond (sister); William Bond (brother)
- Writing career
- Language: English
- Notable works: The Room on the Roof; Our Trees Still Grow in Dehra; A Flight of Pigeons; The Blue Umbrella; Granny's Tree Climbing; Angry River
- Notable awards: John Llewellyn Rhys Prize (1956); Sahitya Akademi Award (1992); Padma Shri (1999); Bal Sahitya Puraskar (2012); Padma Bhushan (2014)

Ruskin Bond (born 19 May 1934) is an Indian author and poet. His first novel, The Room on the Roof, published in 1956, received the John Llewellyn Rhys Prize. Bond has authored more than 500 short stories, essays, and novels which include 69 books for children. He was awarded the Sahitya Akademi Award in 1992 for Our Trees Still Grow in Dehra. He was awarded the Padma Shri Award in 1999 and the Padma Bhushan Award in 2014.

== Life ==
Bond was born on 19 May, 1934 in Kasauli, Punjab States Agency, British India. His father, Aubrey Alexander Bond, who was British, was born in a military camp in Shahjahanpur, a small town in north India. His mother, Edith Dorothy Clarke, was Anglo-Indian.

His father taught English to the princesses of Jamnagar palace, and Bond and his sister Ellen lived there till he was six. Later, his father joined the Royal Air Force in 1939 and Bond, along with his mother and sister, went to live at his mother's maternal home in Dehradun. Shortly after that, he was sent to a boarding school in Mussoorie.

When Bond was eight years old, his mother separated from his father and married a Punjabi Hindu, Hari. His father arranged for Bond to be brought to New Delhi where he was posted. Bond was very close to his father and describes this period (1942–1944) with his father as one of the happiest times of his life. When he was ten, however, his father died of malaria while posted in Calcutta and was buried in the Bhowanipore War Cemetery in Calcutta. At the time, Bond was at his boarding school in Shimla and when informed about this tragedy by his teacher, he was thoroughly heartbroken. Later, he was raised in Dehradun.

He attended Bishop Cotton School in Shimla, graduating in 1951. There he won several writing competitions, including the Irwin Divinity Prize and the Hailey Literature Prize. He wrote one of his first short stories, "Untouchable", at the age of sixteen in 1951.

Following high school, he went to his aunt's home in the Channel Islands in 1951 for better prospects and stayed there for two years. In London when he was seventeen years old, he started writing his first novel, The Room on the Roof, the semi-autobiographical story of the orphaned Anglo-Indian boy named Rusty. It won the John Llewellyn Rhys Prize, (1957) awarded to a British Commonwealth writer under 30. While searching for a publisher, he worked in a photo studio in London. After getting his novel published, he used the advance money to pay sea passage to return to India and settled in Dehradun.

He worked for a few years freelancing from Delhi and Dehradun, sustaining himself financially by writing short stories and poems for newspapers and magazines. About his youth, he said, "Sometimes I got lucky and some [of my works] got selected and I earned a few hundred rupees. Since I was in my 20s and didn't have any responsibilities I was just happy to be doing what I loved doing best."

In 1963, Bond went to live in Mussoorie, a town in the Himalayan foothills in present day Uttarakhand, because—besides his liking of the place—it was close to the editors and publishers in Delhi. He edited a magazine for four years. In the 1980s, Penguin set up in India and approached him to write some books. Penguin India published two of his novels: The Room on the Roof and Vagrants in the Valley, which Bond had written in 1956 as a sequel. These two novels were published in one volume in 1993. The following year, Penguin India published a collection of his non-fiction writings, The Best of Bond Bond. Bond's interest in supernatural fiction led him to write popular titles such as Ghost Stories from the Raj, A Season of Ghosts, and A Face in the Dark and Other Hauntings.

Since then, he has written over five hundred short stories, essays and novels, including The Blue Umbrella, Funny Side Up, A Flight of Pigeons (on which the Hindi film Junoon is based), and more than 50 books for children. He also published his autobiography in what might be called two installments: Scenes from a Writer's Life, describing his formative years growing up in Anglo-India, and a further autobiography, Lone Fox Dancing. The Lamp is Lit is a collection of essays and episodes from his journal.

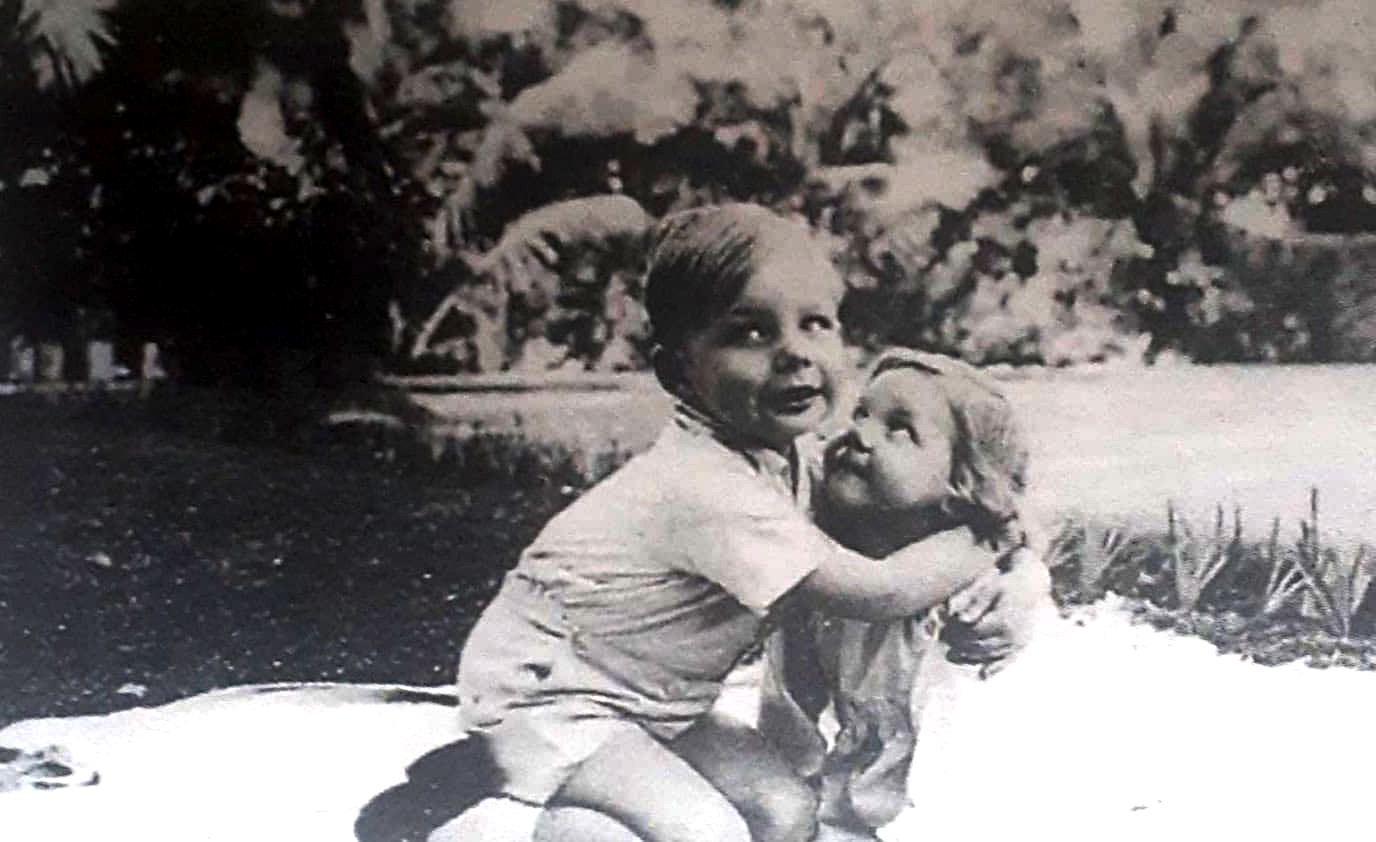
Ruskin Bond with his sister, Ellen. This photograph dates back to 1938.

Since 1963, Bond has lived as a freelance writer in Mussoorie, staying with his adoptive family in Landour, Mussoorie's Ivy Cottage, which has been his home since 1980. Asked what he likes most about his life, he said, "That I have been able to write for so long. I started at the age of 17 or 18 and I am still writing. If I were not a professional writer who was getting published I would still write."

His sister Ellen lived in Ludhiana with their stepsister until she died in 2014. He also has a brother, William, who lives in Canada.

== Literary career ==
Most of Bond's works are influenced by life in the hill stations in the foothills of the Himalayas, where he spent his childhood. The Room on the Roof, was written when he was 17 and published when he was 22. It was partly based on the experiences of him and his friends in his small rented room on the roof in Dehradun. His earlier works were written without being meant for any particular readership. The writing of his first children's book, Angry River, published in 1972, was toned down on a publisher's request for a children's story. About writing for children, Bond said, "I had a pretty lonely childhood and it helps me to understand a child better."

His work reflects his Anglo-Indian experiences and the changing political, social and cultural aspects of India, having been through colonial, postcolonial and post-independence phases of India.

Bond said that while his autobiographical work, Rain in the Mountains valley, was about his years spent in Mussoorie. Scenes from a Writer's Life described his first 21 years. Scenes from a Writer's Life focuses on Bond's trip to England, his struggle to find a publisher for his first book The Room on the Roof and his yearning to come back to India, particularly to Doon. "It also tells a lot about my parents", said Bond. "The book ends with the publication of my first novel and my decision to make writing my livelihood", he explained, adding: "Basically, it describes how I became a writer". Being a writer for over 50 years, Bond experimented with different genres. His early works include fiction, short stories, and novellas with some being autobiographical; and later he tried out non-fiction, romance and books for children. He said that his favourite writing genres are essays and short stories.

He considers himself a "visual writer" because for short stories, he first imagines them like a film and then notes them down. For an essay or travelogue, however, he finds such planning not needed because he feels the unexpected makes them more exciting.

As for his own reading, Bond named Just William by Richmal Crompton, Billy Bunter by Charles Hamilton and classics such as Alice in Wonderland and works by Charles Dickens and Mark Twain.

== Adaptations ==
The 1978 Bollywood film Junoon is based on Bond's novel A Flight of Pigeons, about an episode during the Indian Rebellion of 1857. It was produced by & features Shashi Kapoor and directed by Shyam Benegal.

The Rusty stories have been adapted into a Doordarshan TV series Ek Tha Rusty. Several stories have been incorporated into the Indian school curriculum, including The Night Train at Deoli, Time Stops at Shamli, The Thief's Story and Our Trees Still Grow in Dehra.

In 2005, the Bollywood director Vishal Bhardwaj made a film based on Bond's popular novel for children, The Blue Umbrella. The movie went on to win the National Film Award for Best Children's Film.

Bond made his maiden big-screen appearance with Vishal Bhardwaj's film 7 Khoon Maaf in 2011, based on his short story Susanna's Seven Husbands. In the movie, Bond appears as a bishop with Priyanka Chopra playing the title role.

Parchhayee: Ghost Stories by Ruskin Bond, an Indian web series released on Zee5, is based on the ghost stories written by Bond.

A short film titled Aankhon Ki Gustaakhiyan, featuring Vikrant Massey, was later released, which was adapted from Bond's short story The Eyes Have It.

== The Rusty character ==
Rusty is a popular fictional character created by Bond: a 16-year-old orphaned Anglo-Indian boy living in Dehradun with no real family. Rusty's character offers a teenager's perspective on battling with confusions about life, relationship, happiness and love. He starts living with his guardian John Harrison, who is stern and harsh. Rusty is obliged to follow his guardian's rules and orders and doesn't dare disobey which makes him feel helpless because he knows that if he does, he will get caned. He has no real friends and finds himself very lonely in his guardian's house in the European part of Dehradun. He wants to embrace Indian culture and lifestyle, and so he makes friends with some Indian boys in the local marketplace, hiding this from Harrison, continuing to go on secret adventures with them. Soon he decides to run away from the captivity of Harrison and go to England.

The character of Rusty was based on Bond himself as a teenager. His first book, The Room on the Roof, which he wrote at the age of 17, was a semi-autobiographical story with Rusty being the protagonist. It was based on his friends and the time he spent in a rented room in Dehradun. Most of Rusty's initial years are set in Dehradun, a scenic locale in northern India. Bond was deeply attached to Dehra and most of his stories are inspired by the hills and valleys of this region.

Novels and short stories featuring Rusty include:

- The Room on the Roof
- Vagrants in the Valley (a sequel to The Room on the Roof)
- Rusty, the Boy from the Hills (collection of short stories)
- Rusty Runs Away (collection of short stories)
- Rusty and the Magic Mountain
- Rusty Goes to London
- Rusty Comes Home
- The Adventures of Rusty (collection of short stories)
- Delhi Is Not Far
- Rusty Plays Holi
- Rusty and the Leopard

== Bibliography ==
=== Novels ===
- The Room on the Roof
- Vagrants in the Valley
- Rusty Runs Away
- A Flight of Pigeons
- The Sensualist
- The Panther's Moon
- Once Upon a Monsoon Time
- Delhi Is Not Far
- Angry River
- The Woman on Platform 8
- Strangers in the Night
- All Roads Lead to Ganga
- Tales of Fosterganj
- Maharani
- Leopard on the Mountain
- Grandfather's Private Zoo
- In Grandfather's Garden
- The Blue Umbrella
- Too Much Trouble
- When the Tiger Was King
- Cherry Tree
- The Great Train Journey
- Children of India
- Owls in the Family
- Dust on the Mountain
- The Adventures of Toto
- He said it with Arsenic
- A Season of Ghosts
- The Song of the Forest

=== Memories ===
- Landour Days: A Writer's Journal
- Scenes from a Writer's Life
- With Love from the Hills
- Roads to Mussoorie
- Looking for the Rainbow
- Till the Clouds Roll By
- Coming Round the Mountain
- A Song of India
- All the Roads Lead to Ganga
- Lone fox dancing

== See also ==
- Ek Tha Rusty, a Doordarshan TV show based on Bond's stories
- List of Indian writers
