= A Flight of Pigeons =

1978 novella by Ruskin Bond

- Author: Ruskin Bond
- Original title: ahilan
- Language: English
- Genre: Novella
- Published: 1978
- Publication place: India
- Media type: Print
- Pages: 144 pp (hardcover)
- ISBN: 0-670-04927-1 (Penguin edition, hardcover)

A Flight of Pigeons is a novella by Indian author Ruskin Bond. The story is set in 1857, and is about Ruth Labadoor and her family (who are British) who take help of Hindus and Muslims to reach their relatives when the family's patriarch is killed in a church by the Indian rebels. The novella is an adaptation of the novel Mariam: A Story of the Indian Mutiny (1896) by J. F. Fanthome and is a mix of fiction and non fiction and was adapted into a film in 1978 called Junoon by Shyam Benegal, starring Shashi Kapoor, his wife Jennifer Kendal, and Nafisa Ali.

== Summary ==
The novel starts with the death of the father of Ruth Labadoor in front of her eyes in a church. This murder is committed by the Indian rebellion of 1857 and who have decided to kill all the Britishers of the small town of Shahjahanpur. It is then that Mariam Labadoor, who is the mother of the narrator, Ruth, comes into action. She takes their entire family of six to their trusted friend Lala Ramjimal who keeps them at his home and gives them security and shelter. The Pathan leader Javed Khan learns that there are some foreigners living in Lala Ramjimal's home and he enters his house unannounced and forcefully takes Ruth and Mariam Labadoor to his home. The rest of the book examines the various incidents experienced by the Labadoor family, who are warmly welcomed by family members of Javed Khan. Javed Khan himself is a cunning man and he pleads Mariam to marry Ruth. Mariam opposes the proposition many times as she does not want Ruth to marry Javed Khan. She keeps the condition that if the British are able to defeat the Indian rebels, then Javed Khan will not marry her daughter. But if they are defeated by the rebels, then she would give her daughter to him. The British are able to take the hold of the country and Javed Khan escapes the country and is not heard of. With much help and support, the Labadoor family finally reach their relatives.

== Main characters ==
=== Ruth Labadoor ===
She is the narrator of the novel and witnesses the killing of her father. With the help of her mother, friends and others, she and her family finally make it to their relatives.

=== Lala Ramjimal ===
He is the most trusted friend of the Labadoor family and he gives shelter to the family before Javed Khan forcefully takes them out.

=== Javed Khan ===
He is a courageous Pathan. He loses focus on his commitment when he sees Ruth Labadoor and falls in love with her. Despite many attempts, he is not able to please Mariam Labadoor to let him marry her daughter. He later flees the country and is not heard of.
