= The Blue Umbrella (2005 film) =

- Theatrical release poster
- Directed by: Vishal Bhardwaj
- Written by: Vishal Bhardwaj; Abhishek Chaubey; Minty
- Story by: Ruskin Bond
- Based on: The Blue Umbrella by Ruskin Bond
- Produced by: Ronnie Screwvala; Vishal Bhardwaj
- Starring: Pankaj Kapur; Shreya Sharma; Deepak Dobriyal
- Cinematography: Sachin Kumar Krishnan
- Edited by: Aarif Sheikh
- Music by: Vishal Bhardwaj
- Distributed by: UTV Motion Pictures
- Release dates: 12 October 2005 (Pusan International Film Festival); 10 August 2007 (India)
- Running time: 92 minutes
- Country: India
- Language: Hindi
- Budget: ₹ 2,00,00,000
- Box office: ₹ 3,60,00,000

The Blue Umbrella is a 2005 Indian drama film based on the novel The Blue Umbrella (1980) by Ruskin Bond. It was directed by Vishal Bhardwaj and starred Shreya Sharma and Pankaj Kapur in lead roles. The music was by Bhardwaj and the lyrics were penned by Gulzar.

== Plot ==
The story is set in a small village near Banikhet, Himachal Pradesh and revolves around a nine-year-old girl named Biniya, who lives with her mother and elder brother, and the village's only shopkeeper, Nandakishore "Nandu" Khatri. One day while herding her family cows, Biniya comes across a blue-colored Japanese umbrella belonging to a group of tourists. She takes a liking to the umbrella and trades her bear claw necklace, Yantra, to the Japanese tourists in exchange for it. Biniya's mother scolds her for this, since the bear claw necklace is considered to be auspicious and bring good luck. However, everyone in the village is amazed by the beauty of the umbrella and Biniya acquires a celebrity-like status. This invokes the jealousy of some people, especially Khatri, who covets such an umbrella but finds himself unable to buy one due to its high cost. He tries to buy Biniya's umbrella from her but she refuses.

Khatri's shop boy, Rajaram, offers his help in stealing the umbrella in exchange for an increased salary. In a pasture, Binya finds her umbrella missing and becomes heartbroken, accusing Khatri of stealing it. Khatri's shop is searched but the umbrella is not found. Due to this humiliation, Khatri pledges to buy his own umbrella and soon acquires a similar one in red, which he claims is from Delhi. The center of attraction in the village then shifts from Biniya to Khatri. As a gesture of goodwill to restore pride, the villagers nominate Khatri to be the president at an upcoming village wrestling competition. Biniya continues her investigation and learns that Khatri's umbrella was actually sent by a textile dyer from a nearby town, Banikhet. She accompanies the village policeman to Banikhet to find out the truth. At the same time, Khatri is presiding over the competition when it starts raining and the red dye from the umbrella is washed off, revealing Khatri to be the thief. Due to his theft and lying, Khatri is boycotted by the village.

Post-boycott, Khatri's life becomes miserable as no one visits his shop and even his accomplice Rajaram abandons him. Biniya sympathies with Khatri and decides that he is the real owner of umbrella. She willingly gives the umbrella to Khatri, who is then accepted back into the village.

== Cast ==
- Pankaj Kapur as Nandakishore 'Nandu' Khatri
- Shreya Sharma as Binyadevi "Binya"
- Rahul Kumar as Tikku
- Paramjit Singh Kakran as Rajaram
- Piu Dutt as Binya's mother
- Samrat Mukerji as Vijay "Bijju"
- Kamal Tiwari as Mukhiya
- Dolly Ahluwalia as Lillavati
- Alok Mathur as Masterji
- Rajesh Sharma as Policeman
- Deepak Dobriyal as Guy with robot
- Manek Bedi as Arjun

== Critical response ==
The Blue Umbrella received positive reviews, including Hindustan Times writer Khalid Mohamed who describes it as a child's confection 'with passages of charm, visual aplomb and lively performances.' The acting of Pankaj Kapur is noted in particular.

== Awards ==
- 2007: National Film Award for Best Children's Film

== Soundtrack ==
#	Track	Singer(s)
1	Aasmani Chhatri	Upagna Pandya
2	Barfaan	Sukhwinder
3	Biniya The Warrior Princess	Instrumental
4	Chutti Hai	Upagna Pandya
5	Evil Lurks	Instrumental
6	Nandu The King	Instrumental
7	Panga	Upagna Pandya
8	Rise Above The Sky	Instrumental
9	Tesoo	Upagna Pandya
10	The Arrival	Instrumental
11	The Blue Umbrella	Instrumental
12	The Chash	Instrumental
13	The Desert	Instrumental
14	The Sky In My Hand	Instrumental
