= The Woman on Platform 8 =

- Short story by Ruskin Bond
- Country: India

Publication
- Published in: The Illustrated Weekly of India

The Woman on Platform 8 is a short story written by Indian author Ruskin Bond. It is narrated in first person by a schoolboy named Arun, and recounts an encounter with a mysterious woman in a train station.

The story was first published in The Illustrated Weekly of India between 1955 and 1958. The short story is considered a classic of English-language Indian literature and is frequently referenced in English schoolwork in India.

== Summary ==
Arun, a lonely 12-year-old boy studying in a boarding school, heads back to school after a vacation at home with his parents. He will travel by train which arrives at midnight, but Arun's parents decide he's old enough to travel alone. Arriving several hours early at the Ambala railway station, Arun passes the time by reading books, throwing biscuits at stray dogs, pacing up and down the platform and watching the activities at platform 8 of the station.

Suddenly, Arun hears a woman's soft voice behind him. He turns around and sees a woman of about 30 years of age wearing a white sari. The woman asks Arun if he's alone, and invites the boy to come with her to the refreshments room for snacks and tea. While eating and sharing a conversation, Arun and the woman become quick friends. On their return from the refreshments room, the pair spot a boy jumping across a rail track just as a train engine was approaching. The woman clutches at Arun's arm and behaves anxiously as Arun tries to calm her, but she only settles down after seeing the boy reach the other side safely. The woman thanks Arun for showing compassion.

Later, Arun meets his classmate Satish who introduces him to his mother. Satish's mother asks Arun if the woman is his mother, but before Arun could speak, the woman quickly introduces herself as his mother. Satish's mother then complains about the train's midnight schedule, complains about other boys traveling alone, and warns Arun about talking to strangers in the station. Arun, disliking her condescending tone, contradicts her by telling her, "I like strangers."

Finally, the train arrives at the platform and the boys climb aboard. As they depart, Satish says "Goodbye, mother!" as they wave to each other. Arun also says, "Goodbye, mother!" as he waves farewell to the woman he met at the station. He continues gazing at the woman until she disappeared into the crowd.

== Themes ==
According to Nidhi Malik, The Woman on Platform 8 is a representation of Ruskin Bond's own unfulfilled childhood, following a recurring theme of Bond's children's stories where young boys often play the lead role. In the story, Arun travels alone because his parents cannot spare the time to be with him. The woman on the platform is the manifestation of an ideal mother who is caring, patient, understanding, but also allows for some freedoms for healthy development. According to author Meena Khorana, the story may draw from Bond's inner resentment as a boy when his own mother failed to come and pick him up at the train station in Dehra.

Bond further elaborates on the autobiographical nature of his stories in his book Scenes from a Writer's Life:

"I don’t suppose I would have written so much childhood or even about other children, if my own childhood had been all happiness and light. I find that those who have had contended, normal childhoods, seldom remember much about them; nor do they have much insight into the world of children."

Arun and the woman also represent an inherent faith on the nobility of humans, which is represented by friendliness, generosity, and motherliness towards a complete stranger. This is in contrast to Satish's mother who is suspicious to the woman, and incredulous towards Arun. The portrayals reflect Bond's idea of humanism wherein compassion towards strangers is an inherent among all humans, and which he believes should be taught and demonstrated early in childhood to build a peaceful society.

The interaction between Arun and the woman may also represent Bond's experiences while living in India, where the cultural norms with physical contact and befriending strangers were more open compared to that in England, as Bond writes:

"Human contact! That was what I missed most. It was not to be found in the office where I worked or in my land lady’s house... the freedom to touch someone without being misunderstood. To take someone by the hand as a mark of affection rather than desire... And fulfillment to be among strangers without feeling like an outsider. For there are no strangers in India."

== Controversy ==
The story has faced significant controversy due to the problematic moral lessons and unsafe behaviors it portrays, with many people raising concerns over the messages it sends to young readers. One of the major criticisms is Arun’s unquestioning acceptance of an unknown woman as his "mother" in front of Satish's mother, which some argue sets a disturbing precedent by suggesting that emotional connections with strangers can override real-world safety concerns. Additionally, the narrative has been criticized for normalizing and even romanticizing a young boy engaging in late-night conversations with an unknown adult woman at a railway station, disregarding the potential dangers of such actions. Many readers have pointed out that Arun’s lack of fear and extreme trust in a stranger could mislead children into believing that interacting with unknown adults in isolated places is completely safe. The story has also been scrutinized for contradicting important life lessons about personal safety, as Satish's mother rightly warns about the dangers of talking to strangers, yet the protagonist dismisses her advice with the naive statement, "I like strangers," which some believe promotes an unhealthy disregard for caution. Furthermore, the unnamed woman’s decision to introduce herself as Arun’s mother without his consent, and Arun’s immediate acceptance of this falsehood, has been viewed by critics as problematic, raising concerns about identity manipulation and the implication that lying in such scenarios is acceptable. The story has also been questioned for failing to acknowledge the risks of Arun traveling alone at night, reinforcing a false sense of security that children can navigate the world without precaution. The ending, where Arun gazes longingly at the stranger as if she has left a deep emotional impact, has been perceived by many as further blurring the line between genuine human connection and reckless trust in unfamiliar people. Due to these reasons, the story has sparked debate, with some readers arguing that it sends dangerous moral messages about safety, trust, and the consequences of disregarding caution.
