= Angry River =

1972 children's novel by Ruskin Bond

Angry River is a 1972 children's novel by Indian author Ruskin Bond illustrated by Trevor Stubley. It was published in India and England and translated into Dutch, French, and Hindi.

== Plot summary ==
Sita is a girl who lives with her grandparents in a hut on an island. One of the walls of their hut leans against a rock and the other three walls are made of mud. They lead a effortless lifestyle. While her grandpa works outside, Sita and her grandma work in the house. Suddenly, her grandma becomes very ill and Sita's grandpa plans to take her grandma to the hospital in town. He leaves in a boat with 3 of his goats and tells Sita that he will be back in a few days. He also warns her of the rain, saying that it might cause a flood and that if the level of the water goes very high, she must climb the big peepal tree on the island.

Soon, it begins to rain heavily. Sita goes outside and realizes that it is a flood that looks like an angry river. She sees a few things floating around her in the water. She hurriedly packs things and forgets about her doll. Then she climbs the peepal tree and finds a crow as her friend. Then, the tree is suddenly uprooted in the flood and takes Sita afloat on the river. On the way, Sita sees the tantrum caused by the flood and realises the sadness of the people. The tree suddenly turns to the midstream of the river which frightens Sita. A boy rescues her by taking her along with him on his boat. He rows the boat hard to get away from the midstream. Once the two are out of danger, the boy introduces himself as Krishan. They ate mangoes that were on the boat. Never before did Sita eat mangoes that were as sweet as those Krishan had offered. Sita later learns that her grandmother had died and she returns to the island with her grandfather to build a new house and continue life without her doll Mumta and her grandmother. Afterwards, Krishan visits Sita and teaches her how to play the flute he had earlier gifted her. She also finds another peacock toy which had washed away on the island who could replace her former doll Mumta.

== Literary assessment ==
Meena Khorana in her study of Ruskin Bond's life and works cites Angry River as an example of his works' rootedness in the culture and traditions of India.
