= Alexander Dyachenko (actor) =

Russian actor, record producer, and musician (born 1965)

- Александр Дьяченко
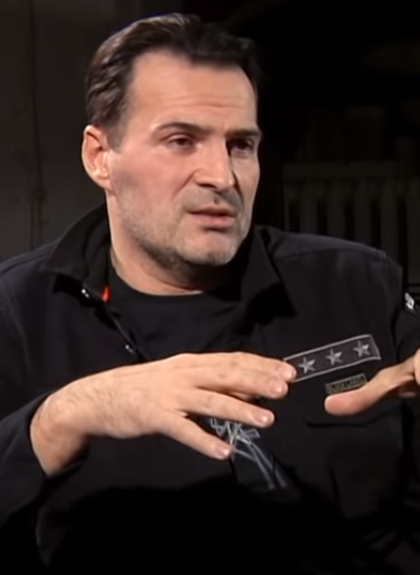
- Born: Alexander Stanislavovich Dyachenko; 12 June 1965 (age 60); Leningrad, RSFSR, USSR
- Citizenship: Russia; United States
- Occupations: Actor; record producer; musician
- Years active: 2000–present

Alexander Stanislavovich Dyachenko (Russian: Александр Станиславович Дьяченко; born June 12, 1965) is a Russian actor, record producer and musician.

== Biography ==
Alexander Dyachenko was born in Leningrad, Russian SFSR, Soviet Union in southern Saint Petersburg, Russia. He studied at Saint Petersburg Electrotechnical University and then received his master's degree in acting from Columbia University of New York.

He started acting in small roles in films. In 1994, he received an offer to try his hand in sports management. As a child Dyachenko loved hockey, he immediately agreed to work as an agent of the Russian hockey players. In 1998, Alexander left his job and moved to the U.S. where he received an actor's education, training in Los Angeles under the teacher Milton Katselos. He acted on stage in Chicago.

His acting career in Russia began with the film Brother 2. In the film, he played the twin brothers Dmitry and Konstantin Gromov. He was cast in a number of Russian films and serials. From his youth Dyachenko has also been a musician; composing, arranging and performing on the guitar and singing. He has recorded some of his songs in a Chicago studio with well-known musicians. In 2012, Alexander, together with drummer Boris Lifschits, created a musical project Antigo.

In year 2011, Dyachenko gave his first Bollywood appearance in 7 Khoon Maaf (an Indian Hindi film directed by Vishal Bhardwaj and produced by Ronnie Screwvala). He played the role of Nikolai Vronsky, the fourth husband of Susanna Anna-Marie Johannes (Priyanka Chopra) who was actually as a Russian spy leading a double life. His role and performance was quite appreciated in Hindi Cinema and the movie made good business at box office.

He appeared in the first season of ice show contest Ice Age.

== Selected filmography ==
- 2000 — Brother 2 as Dmitry Gromov / Konstantin Gromov
- 2001 — The Lion's Share as Musa Mahmaev
- 2002 — The Star as Galiev
- 2003 — Bajazet as Nazar Minayevich Vatnin, esaul
- 2004 — Women's Intuition as Alexander
- 2005 — Women's Intuition 2 as Alexander
- 2006 — Wolfhound as Kanaon
- 2006 — Leshiy as Alexey Nikitin
- 2006 — Friend or foe as Denis Volkov
- 2008 — On the Roof of the World as Dmitry
- 2010 — Inherited Marriage as Urmas
- 2011 — 7 Khoon Maaf as Nicolai Vronsky
- 2012 — Hunting for Gauleiter as Yakov
- 2013 — Ash as Diego, Spaniard
- 2014 — Silver Spoon as Vladimir Yakovlevich Sokolovsky
- 2018 — McMafia as Oleg, Russian embassy employee
- 2018 — Hunter Killer as Russian president Nikolai Zakarin
- 2018 — Double Lies as Leo
- 2019 — Trap for the Queen as Kirill, stepfather of Maria
