= The Blue Umbrella =

1980 novel by Ruskin Bond

The Blue Umbrella is a 1980 Indian novel written by Ruskin Bond. It was adapted into 2005 Hindi film by the same name, directed by Vishal Bhardwaj, which later won the National Film Award for Best Children's Film. In 2012, the novel was adapted into a comic by Amar Chitra Katha publications, titled, The Blue Umbrella – Stories by Ruskin Bond, and included another story, Angry River. This story appeared in Bond's collection of short stories, Children's Omnibus.

== Summary ==
In the village of Garhwal, a girl named Binya used to live there. She was living with her widowed mother and her older brother named Biju.

In that same village, a man named Ram Bharosa had an old shop that sold Coca-Cola with no ice, tea, curd, or sweets. One day, Binya receives a beautiful blue umbrella from some foreigners in exchange for her leopard claw pendant. Soon, the shopkeeper becomes jealous of the umbrella and tries to buy it from Binya by claiming, "This is a fancy umbrella which small girls should not have," but Binya refuses. As time passes, Ram Bharosa's jealousy of the umbrella turns into an obsession. He employs a boy named Rajaram from the next village to work at the shop. When Rajaram learns of his boss' desire to own the umbrella, he makes an attempt to steal it but fails and is caught. Rajaram then gives up Ram Bharosa's name, causing his shop to be boycotted. Ram Bharosa is now remorseful of his actions and miserable. Binya realize her showing off the blue umbrella indirectly led to Ram Bharosa's suffering. In the end, Binya willingly gives the umbrella to Ram Bharosa, who in turn gifts her a bear claw pendant. At last, it ends with a happy note when Binya gives it to Ram Bharosa who made it an umbrella which could be borrowed and returned. Thus, everyone in the village used it for their daily purpose
