= Vishal Bhardwaj =

Indian film director and composer

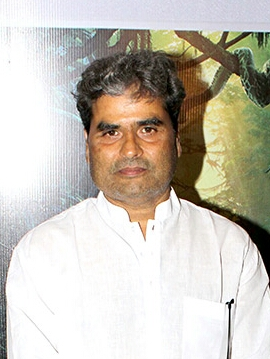
- Bhardwaj in 2016
- Born: 4 August 1965 (age 61); Chandpur, Uttar Pradesh, India
- Occupations: Film director; film producer; screenwriter; music director
- Years active: 1995–present
- Spouse: Rekha Bhardwaj

Vishal Bhardwaj (born 4 August 1965) is an Indian filmmaker, music composer, and playback singer. He is known for his work in Hindi cinema, and is the recipient of nine National Film Awards and a Filmfare Award.

Bhardwaj made his debut as a music composer with the children's film Abhay (1995), and received wider recognition with his compositions in Gulzar's Maachis (1996). He received the Filmfare R. D. Burman Award for New Music Talent for the latter. He went on to compose music for the films Satya (1998) and Godmother (1999). For the latter, he won the National Film Award for Best Music Direction.

Bhardwaj made his directorial debut with the children's film Makdee (2002), for which he also composed the music. He garnered widespread critical acclaim and numerous accolades for writing and directing the Indian adaptations of three tragedies by William Shakespeare: Maqbool (2003) from Macbeth, Omkara (2006) from Othello, and Haider (2014) from Hamlet. He has also directed the action film Kaminey, the black comedy 7 Khoon Maaf (2011), and the satire Matru Ki Bijlee Ka Mandola (2013).

In addition, Bhardwaj produces films under his banner VB Pictures. He has co-written and produced the films Ishqiya (2010), its sequel Dedh Ishqiya (2014), and the drama thriller Talvar (2015), among others. He has composed the musical score for each of his directorial and production ventures, and frequently collaborates with the lyricist Gulzar. He is married to playback singer Rekha Bhardwaj. Bhardwaj is the board member of Mumbai Academy of the Moving Image.

== Early and personal life ==
Bhardwaj was born on 4 August 1965, in Chandpur city in District Bijnor, Uttar Pradesh. His mother Satya Bhardwaj was a homemaker, and his father Ram Bhardwaj was a sugarcane inspector. His father also wrote poetry and lyrics for Hindi films. He and his family lived in Najibabad until he completed class five in school. They later moved to Meerut, where he played cricket for the state's under-19 team. His thumb broke during a practice session one day before an inter-university tournament, leaving him unable to play for the year. The same year, his father died, leaving him unable to continue his cricket career.

He had an elder brother who struggled for years in Mumbai to become a film producer, and later died of a heart attack. He composed a song at the age of seventeen. After hearing the song, his father discussed it with music director Usha Khanna. She used it in the film Yaar Kasam (1985). Bhardwaj later moved to Delhi to pursue his graduation at the Hindu College, University of Delhi. He met his wife, playback singer Rekha Bhardwaj, during a college annual function; she was a year senior to him. He is also an avid tennis player.

== Career ==
Bhardwaj started playing harmonium for friends who were ghazal singers. After a few years, he took up a job with a music company called CBS in Delhi. He later went to Mumbai to become a music composer, and he only took to directing films to create the opportunity to compose music. His interest in film direction was kindled after watching Quentin Tarantino's Pulp Fiction (1994) and Krzysztof Kieślowski's television series Dekalog during a film festival in Thiruvananthapuram.

=== Music composer ===
In 1995, Bhardwaj made his debut as a music composer for the children's film Abhay. He went on to compose music for Fauji (1995) and Sanshodhan (1996). In 1996, he served as the music director for Gulzar's Maachis, for which he received the Filmfare R. D. Burman Award for New Music Talent and his first nomination for the Filmfare Award for Best Music Director. The film depicted the transformation of boys into terrorists during the Punjab insurgency in Punjab in the 1980s. The soundtrack composed by Bhardwaj became an anthem for politically restive college youth at that time. He later collaborated with Gulzar on TV serials such as Alice in Wonderland and Gubbare. His further projects included Betaabi (1997), Tunnu Ki Tina (1997), Satya (1998) and Hu Tu Tu (1999). At the 46th National Film Awards, Bhardwaj received the National Film Award for Best Music Direction for his critically acclaimed score in Godmother (1999).

In 2010, he composed the music for his production venture Ishqiya, which garnered him his second National Film Award for Best Music Direction and his second nomination for the Filmfare Award for Best Music Director. He also composed music for Jungle Book Shōnen Mowgli, the Hindi-dubbed version of the anime adaptation of Rudyard Kipling's original collection of stories, The Jungle Book. Apart from feature films, Bhardwaj has provided music for albums such as Sunset Point (2000), Ishqa Ishqa (2002) and Barse Barse (2011). He frequently collaborates with Gulzar.

=== Writer and director ===
Bhardwaj made his directorial debut with the children's film Makdee (2002), starring Shabana Azmi, Makarand Deshpande and Shweta Prasad. The film tells the story of twin young girls and an alleged witch in a mansion. It was screened in the Critics' Week (Spotlight on India) section at the 2003 Cannes Film Festival.

Bhardwaj had read a short version of William Shakespeare's Macbeth and wanted to turn it into a gangster film. He had seen Akira Kurosawa's Throne of Blood (1957), which was also inspired by Macbeth. It inspired Bhardwaj to make it into a feature film. He then started working with Abbas Tyrewala to adapt the play. This developed into the 2003 film adaptation Maqbool starring Pankaj Kapur, Irrfan Khan and Tabu; it was set against the backdrop of Mumbai underworld. The film was screened at the 2004 Cannes Film Festival and at the 2003 Toronto Film Festival. Sita Menon of Rediff.com called it "..a visual gallery that is an intelligent blend of dark, tragic overtones and comic, satirical undertones." CNN-IBN listed Maqbool as "one of the 100 greatest Indian films of all time" in a 2013 list. In 2010, critic Raja Sen included it in "The Top 75 Hindi Films of the Decade" list.

In 2006, Bhardwaj again adapted Shakespeare, reimagining his tragedy Othello as Omkara. Set against the backdrop of the political system in Uttar Pradesh, the film starred an ensemble cast of Ajay Devgn, Kareena Kapoor, Saif Ali Khan, Konkona Sen Sharma, Vivek Oberoi and Bipasha Basu in lead roles, with Devgn playing the titular character. It premiered at the 6th Marrakech International Film Festival, and was screened at the Cairo International Film Festival. At the 54th National Film Awards, Bhardwaj received the Special Jury Award (feature film) for the film, in addition to earning his first nomination for the Filmfare Award for Best Director. Omkara met with widespread critical acclaim, but was a box office disappointment. However, it opened to a positive box office response in North America and the United Kingdom.

Bhardwaj's next project was the 2005 children's film The Blue Umbrella, based on Ruskin Bond's novel of the same name. It won the National Film Award for Best Children's Film in 2005. His followup was Blood Brothers (2007), a short film on HIV/AIDS with a run time of 13 minutes. It tells the story of a young man who, after finding out that he is HIV positive, allows his life to fall apart. It was a part of the 'AIDS JaaGo', a series of four short films directed by Mira Nair, Santosh Sivan, and Farhan Akhtar in a joint initiative by Nair and the Bill & Melinda Gates Foundation. The series premiered at the 2007 Toronto International Film Festival. The same year, he served as a writer for Sanjay Gupta's anthology film, Dus Kahaniyaan.

In 2009, Bhardwaj directed the action film Kaminey starring Shahid Kapoor and Priyanka Chopra. The film follows the rivalry between identical twins, one with a lisp and one with a stammer. He bought the story for this film from a Kenyan writer. It opened to positive reviews from critics upon release. Anupama Chopra gave a rating of 4 out of 5 and wrote "Kaminey is the best Bollywood film I've seen this year. It's an audacious, original rollercoaster ride. Written and directed by Vishal Bhardwaj, Kaminey requires patience and attention but the pay off is more than worth it." Kaminey was also a financial success, earning over ₹700 million (US$7.3 million) worldwide. The film earned Bhardwaj his second nomination for the Filmfare Award for Best Director and Best Music Director.

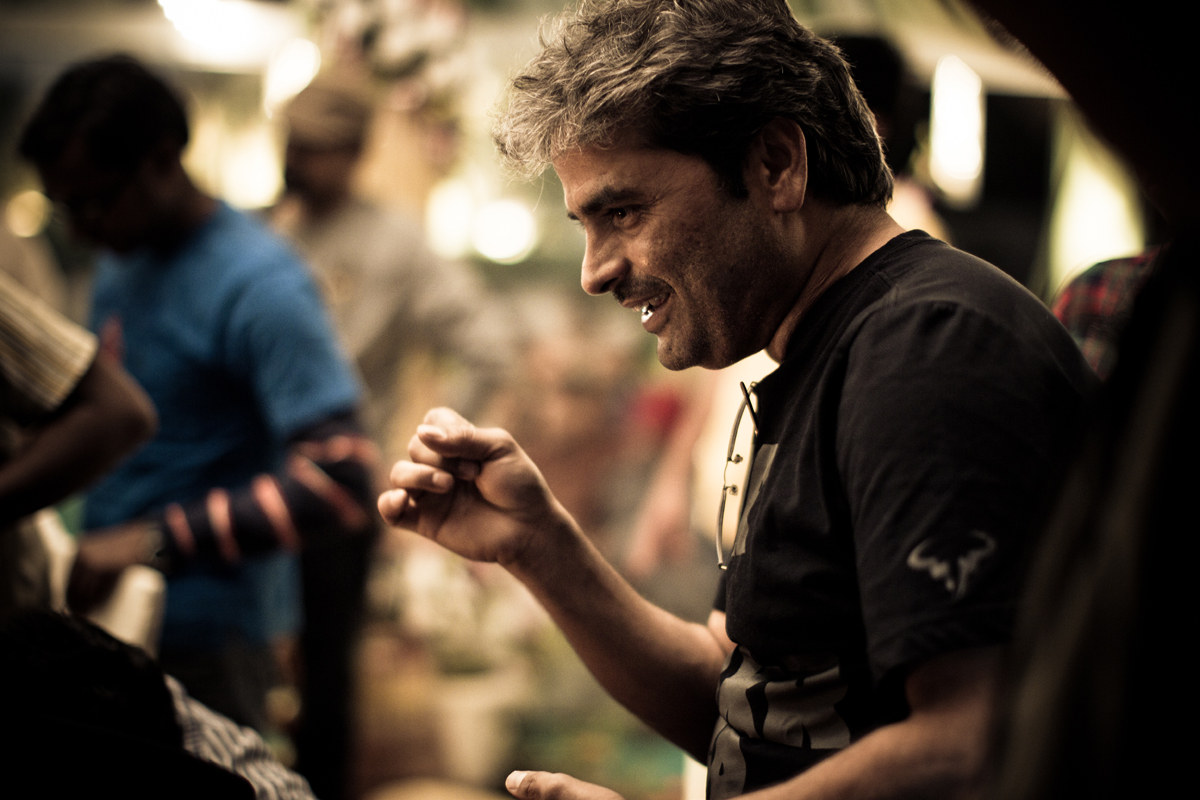
Bhardwaj in 2012

7 Khoon Maaf (2011), a film based on Ruskin Bond's short story, Susanna's Seven Husbands, was Bhardwaj's next directorial venture. The story revolves around Susanna Anna-Marie Johannes (played by Priyanka Chopra) who murders her seven husbands in an unending quest for love. The film was written collaboratively by Bhardwaj, Bond and American writer Matthew Robbins. It released on 18 February 2011 and met with positive reviews. A Zee News critic mentioned in a four out of five star review: "Vishal Bhardwaj does it again. The maverick filmmaker has once again woven magic with his latest blockbuster 7 Khoon Maaf".

In 2013, Bhardwaj directed Matru Ki Bijlee Ka Mandola, a political satire set in the rustic surroundings of a village in Haryana. It starred Anushka Sharma and Imran Khan, with Pankaj Kapur and Shabana Azmi in supporting roles. Bhardwaj also choreographed a song "Oye Boy Charlie" in the film. The film received mixed reviews from critics, and underperformed at the box office.

In 2014, Bhardwaj made his stage debut with the opera A Flowering Tree. It was based on a classic folk tale by Kannada writer and scholar A. K. Ramanujan. In 2014, he completed his Shakespearean trilogy with Haider, based on the tragedy Hamlet. Set during the Kashmir conflict of 1995, the film starred Shahid Kapoor in the titular role, for which he, along with Bhardwaj, charged no money. Haider garnered widespread critical acclaim, though it was controversial among Hindu nationalists for its portrayal of the conflict in Kashmir. CNN-IBN's Rajeev Masand called it "an elegant, thrilling film that casts a brave, unflinching eye on the Kashmir struggle." At the 62nd National Film Awards, Bhardwaj won National Film Awards for Best Music Director and Best Dialogues. It also earned him Filmfare nominations for Best Film and Best Director at the 60th Filmfare Awards.

After a two-year hiatus, Bhardwaj returned in 2016 to direct Rangoon, a romantic drama set during World War II and starring Kangana Ranaut, Shahid Kapoor and Saif Ali Khan. About the film, Bhardwaj said: "In history, very few people know that India was also involved in the war. On the Burma border the British Indian army was fighting against Subhash Chandra Bose's INA (Indian National Army), who were then with Japanese army and Indians were killing Indians at the Burma border." The film opened to generally mixed reviews and failed to find a wide audience at the box office.

In 2018, Bhardwaj wrote, co-produced and directed Pataakha, starring Sanya Malhotra and debutant Radhika Madan as two quarrelsome sisters. It was based on the short story Do Behenein by Rajasthani writer and teacher Charan Singh Pathik, which he loved after reading it in 2013 in the Sahitya Kala Parishad journal. Udita Jhunjhunwala of Mint called the film "real and gritty" with Bhardwaj creating an "altogether authentic world". However, she felt that the film was stretched in length and "squanders its material advantage to pad out a fable that splutters and grunts before it gains momentum."

=== Producer ===
Bhardwaj produces his own films under his banner VB Pictures. In 2010, he produced the black comedy Ishqiya. Starring Vidya Balan, Naseeruddin Shah and Arshad Warsi, the film was directed by debutant Abhishek Chaubey. Chaubey had earlier assisted and co-wrote several of Bhardwaj's films. The film was an average grosser at the box-office. The film earned him his third nomination for the Filmfare Award for Best Music Director. He teamed up with Ekta Kapoor's Balaji Motion Pictures to produce the supernatural thriller Ek Thi Daayan in 2013. Dealing with the theme of witchcraft, the film was based on 'Mobius Trips', a short story written by Konkona Sen Sharma's father. It received mixed reviews from critics, but proved to be profitable at the box office.

His next production venture was Dedh Ishqiya, a sequel to the 2010 film Ishqiya. Starring Madhuri Dixit, Naseeruddin Shah, Huma Qureshi and Arshad Warsi, the film was a critical and commercial success, earning ₹270 million (US$4.1 million) in India and abroad. In 2015, Bhardwaj wrote and co-produced Meghna Gulzar's drama thriller Talvar. The film was based on the 2008 Noida double murder case, and starred Irrfan Khan, Konkana Sen Sharma and Neeraj Kabi. Talvar premiered at the 2015 Toronto International Film Festival, and was released in India on 2 October 2015 to positive reviews from critics.

=== Playback singer ===
Apart from composing music, Bhardwaj has also lent his voice to various songs for films like Omkara, No Smoking, U Me Aur Hum, Kaminey, Striker, 7 Khoon Maaf, Matru Ki Bijlee Ka Mandola, and Haider.

== Craft and style ==
Bhardwaj's films are often twisted, with portrayal of characters with grey shades. He also frequently adapts short stories and plays in films. The Blue Umbrella and 7 Khoon Maaf were adapted from Ruskin Bond's short stories. Maqbool, Omkara and Haider were adaptations of William Shakespeare's tragedies. Some of Bhardwaj's films take inspiration from real-life incidents. The Kashmir conflict was shown in Haider, the Mumbai underworld in Maqbool, and Talvar was based on the 2008 Noida double murder case. Bhardwaj frequently collaborates with writer-lyricist Gulzar, calling him his "father" and "mentor". Most treatments of his films are like documentaries. Haider was co-written by journalist-writer Basharat Peer, who was an eyewitness to the Kashmir conflict.

Bhardwaj is influenced by the filmmaking styles of Krzysztof Kieślowski, Satyajit Ray, Ritwik Ghatak, and Akira Kurosawa. Kieslowski's Dekalog (1989) inspired him to become a filmmaker. Veteran actor Naseeruddin Shah says: "I think he makes interesting films, even though I haven't liked all his works. But even his poor work is more interesting than a lot of people's so-called good work."

== Awards and nominations ==
He won the National Film Award for Best Music Direction for Godmother. He then went on to win two consecutive awards: The Blue Umbrella, which won the National Film Award for Best Children's Film, and National Film Award – Special Jury Award for Omkara. Bhardwaj received two Filmfare nominations for Kaminey for Best Director and Best Music Director.

He won his second National Film Award for Best Music Direction for his production venture Ishqiya. At the 62nd National Film Awards, Bhardwaj won his third Best Music Director and Best Screenplay award for Haider. In 2016, Bhardwaj was given the Yash Bharti Award by the Government of Uttar Pradesh for his contributions in the field of cinema. He also received his second National Film Award for Best Screenplay for writing Talvar. Bhardwaj's Shakespearean trilogy—Maqbool, Omkara and Haider—was screened as part of an event marking the 400th anniversary of William Shakespeare's death, co-hosted by the British Film Institute in London. In 2019, Bhardwaj won the Kerala State Film Award for Best Music Director for his second Malayalam film Carbon.

== Filmography ==
Key
†	Denotes films that have not yet been released

=== Director ===
Year	Title	Director	Producer	Screenwriter	Notes
2002	Makdee	Yes	Yes	Yes	
2003	Maqbool	Yes	Yes	Yes	
2005	The Blue Umbrella	Yes	Yes	Yes	National Film Award for Best Children's Film
2006	Omkara	Yes	No	Yes	National Film Award – Special Jury Award (feature film); Nominated - Filmfare Award for Best Director; Nomimated - Filmfare Award for Best Dialogue; Nominated - Filmfare Award for Best Background Score
2007	Blood Brothers	Yes	No	Yes	Short film
2007	No Smoking	No	Yes	No	
2007	Dus Kahaniyaan	No	No	Yes	
2009	Kaminey	Yes	Yes	Yes	story by Cajetan Boy and Bhardwaj; co-written screenplay with Sabrina Dhawan, Abhishek Chaubey
2010	Ishqiya	No	Yes	Yes	
2011	7 Khoon Maaf	Yes	Yes	Yes	
2013	Matru Ki Bijlee Ka Mandola	Yes	Yes	Yes	
2013	Ek Thi Daayan	No	Yes	Yes	
2014	Dedh Ishqiya	No	Yes	Yes	
2014	Haider	Yes	Yes	Yes	National Film Award for Best Screenplay (Dialogues)
2015	Talvar	No	Yes	Yes	National Film Award for Best Screenplay (Adapted)
2017	Rangoon	Yes	Yes	Yes	
2018	Pataakha	Yes	Yes	Yes	
2022	Modern Love: Mumbai	Yes	No	Yes	Anthology series on Amazon Prime Video
2023	Kuttey	No	Yes	Yes	
2023	Fursat	Yes	No	Yes	Short film
2023	Charlie Chopra & the Mystery of Solang Valley	Yes	Yes	Yes	SonyLIV TV series
2023	Khufiya	Yes	Yes	Yes	Netflix original film
2026	O'Romeo	Yes	Yes	Yes	
2026	Lust Stories 3	Yes	No	Yes	Netflix film

=== Music director ===
Year	Title	Notes
1995	Abhay	
1995	Fauji	
1996	Sanshodhan	
1996	Maachis	
1997	Tunnu Ki Tina	
1997	Betaabi	
1998	Sham Ghansham	
1998	Satya	
1998	Chachi 420	
1998	Daya	Malayalam film
1999	Jahan Tum Le Chalo	
1999	Hu Tu Tu	
1999	Godmother	National Film Award for Best Music Direction
1999	Sunset point ft. Gulzar K.S.Chithra & Bhupinder Singh	
2000	Dil Pe Mat Le Yaar	
2000	Choo Lenge Akash	
2001	Love Ke Liye Kuch Bhi Karega	
2002	Mulaqaat	
2002	Makdee	
2003	Kagaar: Life on the Edge	
2003	Danav	
2003	Chupke Se	
2003	Maqbool	
2003	Paanch	Unreleased
2005	Bhagmati	
2005	Ramji Londonwale	
2005	The Blue Umbrella	
2006	Omkara	
2007	Nishabd	
2007	Blood Brothers	Short film
2007	No Smoking	
2007	Dus Kahaniyaan	
2008	U Me Aur Hum	
2008	Haal-e-Dil	
2009	Kaminey	
2010	Ishqiya	National Film Award for Best Music Direction
2011	7 Khoon Maaf	
2013	Matru Ki Bijlee Ka Mandola	
2013	Ek Thi Daayan	
2014	Dedh Ishqiya	
2014	Haider	National Film Award for Best Music Direction
2015	Drishyam	
2015	Talvar	
2015	Hawaizaada	
2016	Madaari	
2016	Motu Patlu: King Of Kings	Animation film
2017	Rangoon	
2018	Carbon	Malayalam film Kerala State Film Award for Best Music Director
2018	Pataakha	
2019	Sonchiriya	
2021	1232 KMS	National Film Award for Best Non-Feature Film Music Direction
2021	Navarasa	Tamil Webseries; Episode: Inmai
2022	Darlings	Two songs
2023	Kuttey	
2023	Fursat	Short film
2023	Khufiya	
2025	Crazxy	Four songs

=== As playback singer ===
Year	Film	Song	Composer	Writer(s)	Co-artist(s)	Note
2009	Kaminey	"Kaminey"	himself	Gulzar		

== Music video ==
Year	Title	Label	Ref.
2020	Palkein Kholo	VB Music	
2020	Dhoop Aane Do	VB Music	
2020	Mask Kho Gaya	VB Music	
