= Banikhet =

- village
- Location in Himachal Pradesh, India Banikhet (India)
- Coordinates: 32.545556°N 75.943669°E
- Country: India
- State: Himachal Pradesh
- District: Chamba

Languages
  - Official: Hindi
- Time zone: UTC+5:30 (IST)
- PIN: 176303
- Telephone code: 1899 (Chamba)
- Vehicle registration: HP 47
- Nearest city: Dalhousie

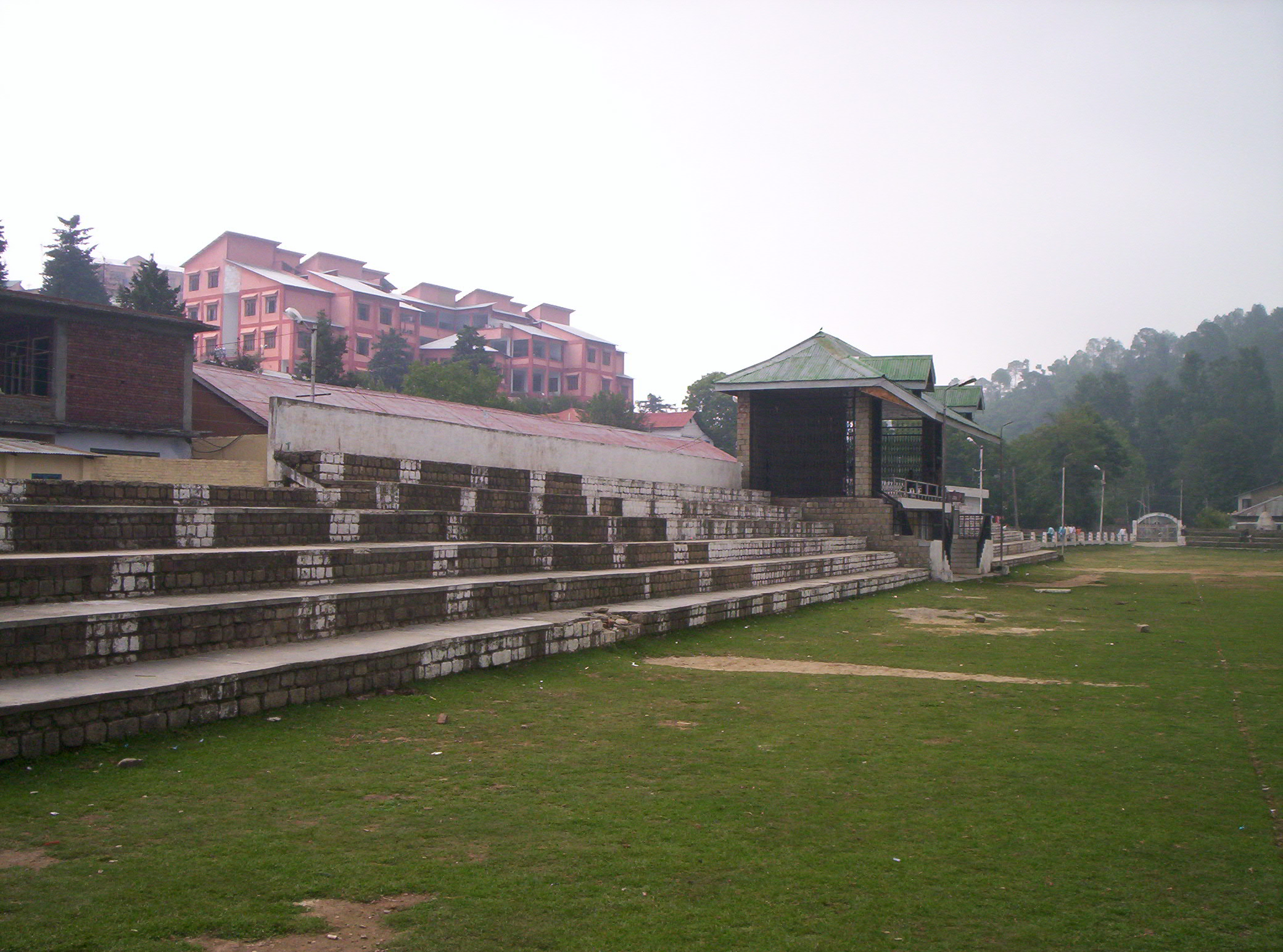
Paddar Ground

Banikhet is located about seven kilometers from Dalhousie, India. It is an important centre of tourism in the Chamba district.

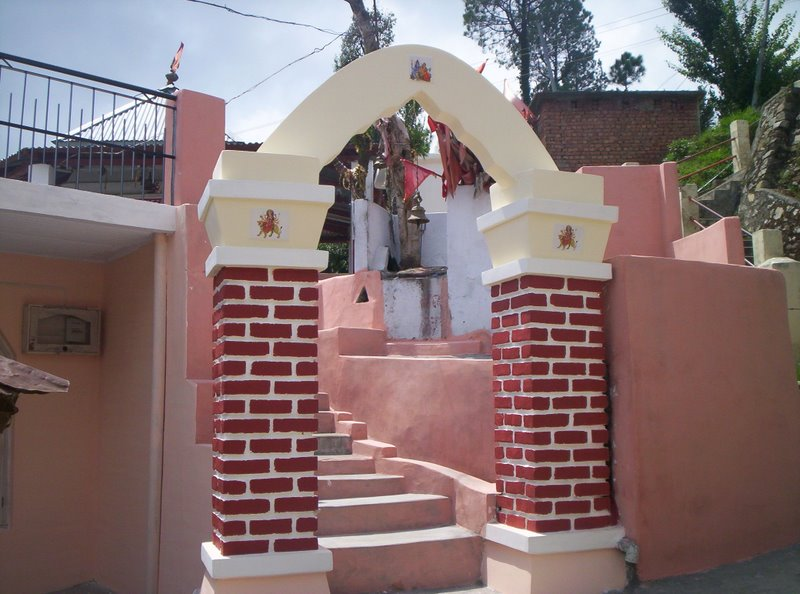
Jawala Mata Mandir

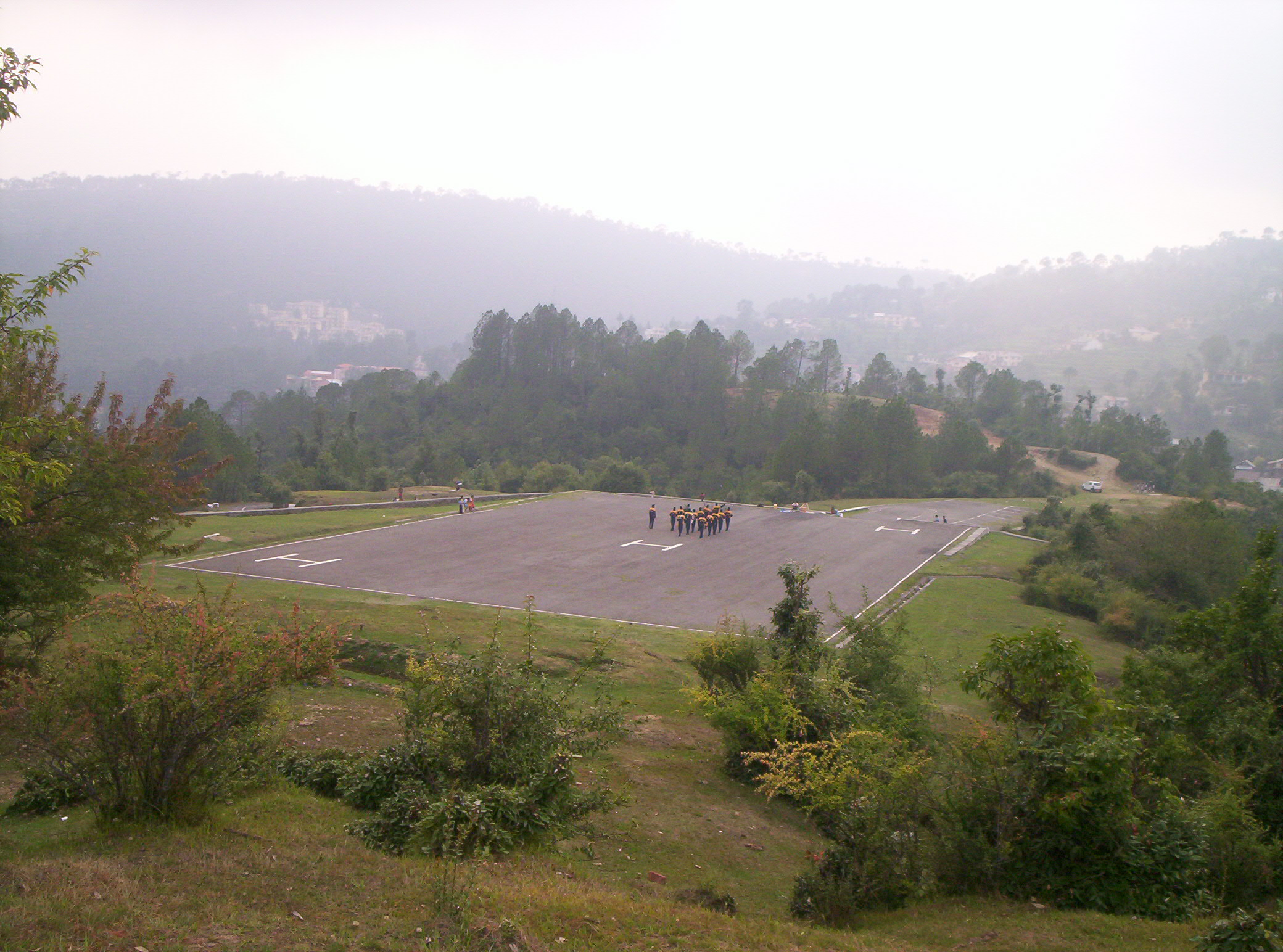
Helipad

== Geography ==
Banikhet is situated in the Dhauladhar range of the Himalayas at an altitude of 5,500 feet (1,700 m) above the sea level. It has daytime temperature of 25 °C and night temperature of about 15 °C during summers.

== Tourism ==
Banikhet is home to a number of tourist attractions, including the Historical Naag Mandir, Jawala Mata Mandir and Helipad. The town's profile has been raised with the establishment of NHPC Ltd.'s Chamera Hydro-Electric Project.

== Education ==
Banikhet has around four schools, including Kendriya Vidyalaya Sangathan and the only college (DAV) in area.
