= Asha Kumari (politician) =

Indian politician

Member of the Himachal Pradesh Legislative Assembly
- In office 2012–2022
- Succeeded by: Dhavinder Singh
- Constituency: Dalhousie

Personal details
- Party: Indian National Congress
- Spouse: Brijendra Singh
- Education: Barkatullah University

Asha Kumari is a leader of Indian National Congress and an All India Congress Committee secretary and Former AICC in charge of Punjab. She was a member of the Himachal Pradesh Legislative Assembly from Dalhousie.

She was education minister of the state from 2003 to 2005.

== Personal life ==
She married Brijendra Singh, son of Lakshman Singh, Raja of Chamba.

== Controversy ==
On 29 December 2017, Kumari gained controversy after she slapped a female constable during an argument, after which she was slapped back by the constable. She later apologized for her actions.

== Conviction ==
Kumari was sentenced to one-year imprisonment in a land grabbing case. She was held guilty for criminal conspiracy and accused of manipulating revenue records, fabricating wills and transferring about 24 acres of government forest land in the name of her husband Brijender Singh. She is currently out on bail.
