= USS Diachenko =

1944 Crosley-class high speed transport

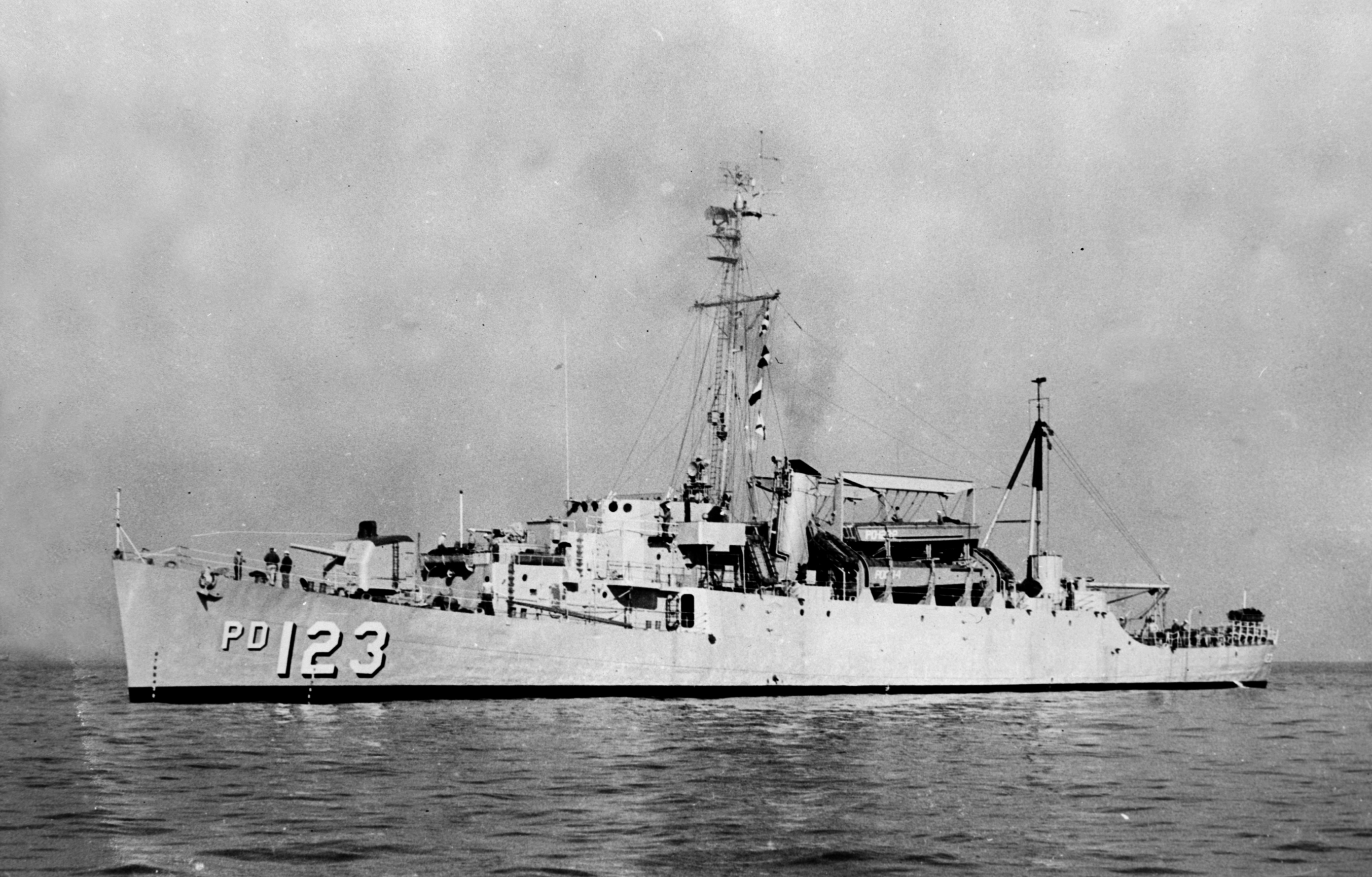
- USS Diachenko (APD-123) in January 1956

History

United States
- Name: USS Alex Diachenko until 1 March 1945, then USS Diachenko
- Namesake: Alex M. Diachenko (1919-1943), a United States Navy sailor and Silver Star recipient
- Builder: Bethlehem Steel Company, Quincy, Massachusetts
- Laid down: 18 July 1944
- Launched: 15 August 1944
- Sponsored by: Mary Diachenko
- Commissioned: 8 December 1944
- Decommissioned: 30 September 1959
- Recommissioned: 1961
- Decommissioned: 30 July 1969
- Recommissioned: 1 November 1971
- Renamed: From USS Alex Diachenko to USS Diachenko 1 March 1945
- Reclassified: From destroyer escort (DE-690) to high-speed transport (APD-123) during construction; Amphibious transport, small (LPR-123) 1 January 1969
- Stricken: 15 September 1974
- Honors and awards: Battle stars; World War II (2); Korean War (6); Vietnam War (5)
- Fate: Sold for scrap on 1 June 1975
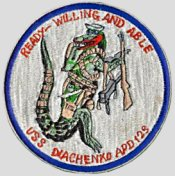
- Badge

General characteristics
- Displacement: 1,400 tons
- Length: 306 ft (93 m)
- Beam: 37 ft (11 m)
- Draft: 12 ft 7 in (4 m)
- Propulsion: 2 × Combustion Engineering DR boilers; 2 × GE turbines (turbo-electric drive); 2 × shafts (12,000 shp)
- Speed: 23.6 knots (43.7 km/h)
- Endurance: 6,000 nautical miles @ 12 knots (11,000 km @ 22 km/h)
- Troops: 12 officers, 150 enlisted
- Complement: 12-15 officers, 192-192 enlisted
- Armament: 1 × 5"/38 dual purpose gun mount; 3 × twin 40 mm gun mounts; 6 × single 20 mm gun mounts; 2 × depth charge tracks

USS Diachenko (APD-123), ex-USS Alex Diachenko, ex-DE-690, later LPR-123, was a Crosley-class high speed transport in commission from 1944 to 1959 and from 1961 to 1969. She served in the United States Navy during World War II, the Cold War, the Korean War, and the Vietnam War.

== Namesake ==
Alex Maxwell Diachenko was born on 21 March 1919 in Hartford, Connecticut. He enlisted in the Navy on 24 September 1940. On 10 March 1943, his ship USS Eberle apprehended the German blockade runner Karin in the South Atlantic. Watertender Second Class Diachenko was one of the boarding party sent to seize the ship. These men lost their lives when scuttling charges exploded. He was posthumously awarded the Silver Star.

== Construction and commissioning ==
Diachenko was laid down as Rudderow class destroyer escort Alex Diachenko (DE-690) by the Bethlehem Steel Company in Quincy, Massachusetts. She was redesignated as a Crosley-class high-speed transport while under construction. She was launched on 15 August 1944 with Miss Mary Diachenko as sponsor, and commissioned as USS Alex Diachenko (APD-123) on 8 December 1944.

== World War II ==
Alex Diachenko entered service in the final year of World War II, and was assigned to the Asiatic-Pacific Theater. She sailed from Norfolk, Virginia, Virginia, on 31 January 1945, stopping at San Diego, Pearl Harbor, Eniwetok, and Ulithi—being renamed USS Diachenko on 1 March 1945 while on her voyage—before arriving at Leyte on 21 March. She transported troops during the reoccupation of the Philippines. She landed soldiers at Legaspi, Philippines on 1 April and Police Harbor on 17 April. She arrived at Morotai, Indonesia on 7 May and transported Australian soldiers for the upcoming invasion at Brunei Bay, Borneo. She returned to Morotai, and on 26 June she set sail to land troops in the assault of Balikpapan, Indonesia on 1 July.

With the end of the war the following month, Diachenko spent the next several months transporting soldiers throughout the region until 17 March 1946 when she set sail for the United States. She arrived at San Pedro, California on 25 April 1946. She carried out operations across the North Pacific Ocean from her homeport in San Diego for the next few years until hostilities broke out in Korea.

== Korean War ==
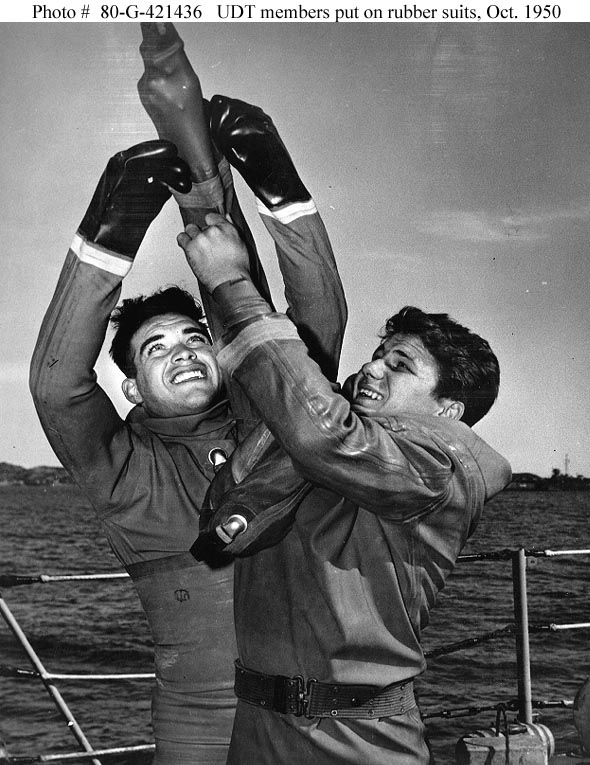
Underwater demolition team members suiting up onboard Diachenko

Diachenko set sail for the United States naval base at Sasebo, Japan, on 30 June 1950, five days after the North Koreans crossed the 38th parallel. She supported the United Nations forces from her base in Sasebo, often transporting an underwater demolition team making beach surveys and conducting reconnaissance. She returned to the United States on 9 May 1951 for an overhaul. During her second tour of duty, from 10 March to 5 December 1952, Diachenko carried an underwater demolition team on reconnaissance missions and raids at Wonsan, North Korea. She participated in the bombardment and blockade of the Korean coast from Wonsan to Chongjin, North Korea. She set sail for the United States on 5 December 1952 for an overhaul.

== Between wars ==
After hostilities ended, Diachenko returned to Japan on 22 August 1953 with the 2nd Marine Reconnaissance Unit, delivering them to Nagoya. She spent the remainder of the year participating in amphibious exercises in Japanese waters. She served as a station ship in Hong Kong from 27 February to 6 March 1954 before returning to San Diego on 7 May. Diachenko sailed from San Diego on 31 March 1955, arriving at Yokosuka, Japan, on 19 April. On 3 May, she reported to Hai Phong, French Indochina, where she served as flagship for the Evacuation Unit Commander during Operation Passage to Freedom, carrying refugees out of Communist North Vietnam and into South Vietnam. She returned to San Diego on 30 September 1955.

Diachenko left San Diego on 28 August 1956, and headed to Yokosuka, Japan, where she picked up an underwater demolition team. She then picked up a Marine reconnaissance company at Okinawa and sailed them to Thailand, where they trained their Thai counterparts. She also participated in amphibious exercises and landings at Iwo Jima, Okinawa, and Luzon. She returned to San Diego on 26 August 1957 to train reserves and operate with underwater demolition teams.

Diachenko returned to the West Pacific on 12 June 1958 and operated out of Okinawa and Subic Bay, Luzon, and in Japanese waters. On 23 August, she dropped off 6 LCVPs at Djakarta, Java. She conducted exercises with Chinese Nationalist forces at Taiwan from 1 to 10 September. Upon her return to San Diego, Diachenko resumed local operations until she was placed into the reserve fleet on 1 April 1959. She was decommissioned on 30 June 1959.

== Vietnam War ==
Diachenko was recommissioned in 1961. She served in Vietnam for three years, from 18 July 1965 to 12 August 1968. She played a role in the defense of South Vietnam and phases two, four, and five of the American counteroffensive. She also participated in the Tet Offensive in 1968. With the war winding down, Diachenko returned to San Diego where she was reclassified as an amphibious transport, small, (LPR-123) on 1 January 1969. She was decommissioned on 30 July 1969 and transferred to the reserve fleet.

== Final period in commission ==
Diachenko was recommissioned on 1 November 1971.

== Final decommissioning and disposal ==
Diachenko was stricken from the Naval Vessel Register on 15 September 1974, and sold for scrapping on 1 June 1975.
