= Get Shorty (franchise) =

Film franchise article

- Official franchise logo, as released in 1995.
- Starring: John Travolta; Gene Hackman; Rene Russo; Danny DeVito; Uma Thurman; Vince Vaughn; Various actors (See below)
- Distributed by: Metro-Goldwyn-Mayer
- Country: United States
- Language: English
- Budget: $105,250,000 (2 films)
- Box office: $210,865,338 (2 films)

The Get Shorty franchise consists of American gangster-comedies, including two theatrical films and a television series spin-off. Based on the titular novel by Elmore Leonard, the plot of the installments center around individuals within the criminal mafia organization, who are determined to leave the organization and pursue careers in the film and music industries. Featuring a cast ensemble, the story includes the realities of immoral conduct within various industries through the comedic lens.

The franchise as a whole has been met with mixed success. The original film received positive critical response, and successfully turned a financial profit in theaters. Alternatively, its sequel was met with negative reception by critics who called it inferior to its predecessor, and also earned less in its ticket sales at the box office. The spin-off television series however, was met with a range of reactions with some critics praising its approach, while others concluded that it was lacking in comparison to the original movie. Despite the mixed critical response, the show was deemed a success among audiences due to its viewership figures.

== Origin ==
The 1990 American comedic-crime novel and its subsequent sequel were authored by Elmore Leonard, and both originally published through Delacorte Press. Serving as the basis for the film and television adaptations, both novels were met with positive reception. In Get Shorty, the plot follows a loan shark from Miami, Florida named Ernesto "Chili" Palmer, who works for the criminal mob and is tasked with traveling to Las Vegas, Nevada to retrieve an outstanding balance. In the process of doing so, the character determines that he wants to escape his past and pursue a career in the film industry.

Leonard continued the plot in its 1999 sequel titled, Be Cool; which served as the basis for the titular film sequel. The plot details Chili Palmer's disenchantment with movie making, and his decision to pursue a career as a record producer instead. The plot details Palmer's continued attempts to escape his criminal past, all while realizing that there are illegal influences in many areas of society.

== Film ==
Film	U.S. release date	Director	Screenwriter	Producers
Get Shorty	October 20, 1995	Barry Sonnenfeld	Scott Frank	Danny DeVito, Michael Shamberg and Stacey Sher
Be Cool	March 4, 2005	F. Gary Gray	Peter Steinfeld	Danny DeVito, Michael Shamberg and Stacey Sher

=== Get Shorty (1995) ===
Ernesto "Chili" Palmer, a mobster from Miami and works as a loan-shark for a violent and dangerous gangster named Ray "Bones" Barboni, is sent to Las Vegas to retrieve the funds from an outstanding loan. Meanwhile, Chili is also hired to recover some bad debt from a film producer named Harry Zimm. Upon confronting Zimm, Chili is introduced to the film crew: the star of a series of horror films, named Karen Flores; the financier of Zimm's drug-dealing, named Bo Catlett; and a Hollywood star who also happens to be Karen's ex, named Martin "Shorty" Weir. Chili soon finds that he and Karen have a romantic connection, and after discovering the filmmaking business, he pitches his own life story for Zimm's next movie. Chili quickly learns that his background as a part of the mob, comedically leads into the movie industry.

=== Be Cool (2005) ===
Years later, Ernesto "Chili" Palmer has grown disillusioned by the movie industry. After the poor reception to his most recent release, a studio mandated sequel film starring Martin "Shorty" Weir, Chili determines to pursue another industry instead. When his friend Tommy Athens who works as a recording studio executive is murdered, Chili offers to help his estranged widow named Edie run the record company. Determined to complete the goals of his deceased friend by introducing the world to his protégé, a feisty young R&B nightclub singer named Linda Moon; Chili begins using the negotiation skills from his past to manipulate events in favor of his goals. Though the music industry is different, Chili soon discovers that his mobster past intersects with the music industry upon coming into conflict with the Russian mafia, and a gangster rap group.

== Television ==
Series	Season(s)	Episodes	Originally released			Showrunner	Executive producers	Status
Series	Season(s)	Episodes	First released	Last released	Network	Showrunner	Executive producers	Status
Get Shorty	3	27	August 13, 2017	November 17, 2019	Epix	Davey Holmes	Davey Holmes, Adam Arkin, Etan Frankel and Allen Coulter	Ended

Miles Daly as he works for a ruthless crime lord named Amara de Escalones and her nephew Yago. Miles has been looking for another profession as a means to reconnect with his estranged wife Katie, and eager to maintain his relationship with his daughter named Emma. When she sends Daly to Los Angeles alongside another enforcer named Louis to retrieve some debt from a screenwriter, Miles soon discovers an opportunity that he determines is too good to pass up. After reading the writer's unproduced script, he and Louis determine to steal it believing that it may be one of the greatest films never made. The duo approach a movie producer named Rick Moreweather and present their pitch for the story. As they begin working together to realize the project, Miles is surprised to find that his immoral background in the crime industry has a lot more in common with movie making than he had initially would have thought.

== Main cast and characters ==
List indicators

This section includes characters who will appear or have appeared in the franchise in main roles.

- An empty grey cell indicates the character was not in the film, or that the character's official presence has not yet been confirmed.
- ^{C} indicates a cameo role.
- ^{V} indicates a voice-only role.

Character	Film		Television
Character	Get Shorty	Be Cool	Get Shorty (The Series)
Ernesto "Chili" Palmer	John Travolta	John Travolta	
Harry Zimm	Gene Hackman		
Karen Flores	Rene Russo		
Martin "Shorty" Weir	Danny DeVito	Danny DeVito	
Ray "Bones" Barboni	Dennis Farina		
Bo Catlett	Delroy Lindo		
Bear	James Gandolfini		
Leo Devoe	David Paymer		
Tommy Carlo	Martin Ferrero		
Mr. Escobar	Miguel Sandoval		
Ronnie Wingate	Jon Gries		
Faye Devoe	Linda Hart		
Edie Athens		Uma Thurman	
Roger "Raji" Lowenthal		Vince Vaughn	
Sin LaSalle		Cedric "the Entertainer" Kyles	
Dabu		André Benjamin	
Steven Tyler		Steven Tyler	
Joseph "Joe Loop" Lupino		Robert Pastorelli	
Linda Moon		Christina Milian	
Hyman Gordon		Paul Adelstein	
Nick Carr		Harvey Keitel	
Elliott Wilhelm		Dwayne "The Rock" Johnson	
Marla		Debi Mazar	
Darryl		GregAlan Williams	
Tommy Athens		James Woods	
Roman Bulkin		Alex Kubik	
Ivan Argianiyev		George Fisher	
Miles Daly			Chris O'Dowd
Rick Moreweather			Ray Romano
Louis Darnell			Sean Bridgers
Emma "Shorty" Daly			Carolyn Dodd
Amara de Escalones			Lidia Porto
Yago de Escalones			Goya Robles
April Quinn			Megan Stevenson
Katie Daly			Lucy Walters
Gladys Parrish			Sarah Stiles
Giustino Moreweather			Peter Bogdanovich
Hafdis Snaejornsson			Peter Stormare
Tyler Mathias			Topher Grace

== Additional production and crew details ==
Title	Crew/Detail					
Title	Composer	Cinematographer(s)	Editor(s)	Production companies	Distributing companies	Running time
Get Shorty	John Lurie	Donald Peterman	Jim Miller	Metro-Goldwyn-Mayer, Jersey Films	Metro-Goldwyn-Mayer	1 hr 45 mins
Be Cool	John Powell	Jeffrey L. Kimball	Sheldon Kahn	Metro-Goldwyn-Mayer, Jersey Films	MGM Distribution Co.	2 hrs
Get Shorty (The Series)	Antonio Sánchez	Attila Szalay, M. David Mullen, Joseph E. Gallagher, and David Franco	David Dworetzky, Blake Maniquis, Keith Henderson, Annette Davey, Addison Donnell, Eli Nilsen, and Scott Vickrey	MGM Television, MGM/UA Television, Holmes Quality Yarnds Productions	Epix	18 hrs (40 mins/episode)

== Reception ==
=== Box office and financial performance ===
Film	Box office gross			Box office ranking		Budget	Worldwide net total income	Ref.
Film	North America	Other territories	Worldwide	All-time North America	All-time worldwide	Budget	Worldwide net total income	Ref.
Get Shorty	$72,101,622	$43,000,000	$115,101,622	#1,202	#2,174	$30,250,000	$84,851,622	
Be Cool	$56,046,979	$39,716,737	$95,763,716	x̄ #1,632	x̄ #2,320	$75,000,000	$20,763,716	
Totals	$128,148,601	$82,716,737	$210,865,338	#1,417	#2,247	$105,250,000	$105,615,338	—N/a

=== Critical and public response ===
Film	Rotten Tomatoes	Metacritic	CinemaScore
Get Shorty	88% (57 reviews)	82/100 (22 reviews)	B+
Be Cool	30% (170 reviews)	37/100 (38 reviews)	B−
Get Shorty (The Series)	78% (27 reviews)	71/100 (22 reviews)	—N/a
