= Matt Harris (screenwriter) =

American screenwriter and TV producer

Matt Harris is an American screenwriter and television producer.

Harris is best known for his screenplay The Starling, an American comedy-drama film bought by Netflix directed by Theodore Melfi starring Melissa McCarthy, Chris O'Dowd, Kevin Kline, Timothy Olyphant, Daveed Diggs, Skyler Gisondo, Loretta Devine, Laura Harrier, Rosalind Chao, and Kimberly Quinn.

He was awarded a Nicholl Fellowship in Screenwriting in 2002 for the screenplay Moon of Popping Trees. The Moon of Popping Trees screenplay was adapted into Dead For a Dollar, an upcoming American Western thriller film directed by Walter Hill.

He has served as the executive producer of various television series including Ridiculousness, Crashletes, and TruTV Top Funniest.
