= The Starling =

2021 film directed by Theodore Melfi

- Promotional release poster
- Directed by: Theodore Melfi
- Written by: Matt Harris
- Produced by: Theodore Melfi; Kim Quinn; Dylan Sellers
- Starring: Melissa McCarthy; Chris O'Dowd; Timothy Olyphant; Daveed Diggs; Skyler Gisondo; Laura Harrier; Kim Quinn; Rosalind Chao; Loretta Devine; Kevin Kline
- Cinematography: Lawrence Sher
- Edited by: Matt Friedman; Peter Teschner
- Music by: Benjamin Wallfisch
- Production companies: Limelight; Entertainment One; Boies/Schiller Film Group
- Distributed by: Netflix
- Release dates: September 12, 2021 (TIFF); September 17, 2021
- Running time: 103 minutes
- Country: United States
- Language: English

The Starling is a 2021 American comedy drama film directed by Theodore Melfi and written by Matt Harris. The film stars Melissa McCarthy, Chris O'Dowd, Timothy Olyphant, Kim Quinn, Skyler Gisondo, Loretta Devine, Ravi Kapoor, Daveed Diggs, Rosalind Chao, Laura Harrier, and Kevin Kline.

The Starling premiered at the 2021 Toronto International Film Festival on September 12, 2021, and had a limited release on September 17, 2021, prior to streaming on Netflix on September 24, 2021. It received unfavorable reviews from critics.

== Plot ==
Jack and Lilly Maynard happily paint an outdoors mural on their infant Katie's bedroom wall as she contentedly watches them.

Months later, the couple are grieving Katie's SIDS death. Jack is residing in a mental hospital while Lilly remains working as a supermarket assistant manager, grieving alone.

After Lilly's visit at the facility, where the group session goes particularly badly, a counselor follows her out. Feeling she is prioritizing Jack's grief without managing her own, she suggests Lilly see someone for her own mental health.

Trying to stay strong for Jack's return, in addition to work, Lilly works on their family's property. She tackles the unkempt yard and garden under the sprawling tree by the house. As she works, a starling nesting in the tree begins to attack her.

Meanwhile, at the facility, Jack secretly cheeks his medication and is not cooperative in his personal sessions. He complains about Lilly's regular visits, not appreciative of the snack she always brings, nor of the weekly two-hour drive she takes to see him.

After avoiding Katie's room since her death, Lilly finally enters. She methodically empties it of furniture and baby clothes, then does the same in the living room. A young expectant couple comes by, eyeing the crib. Lilly trades everything for their recliner.

After organising the home, Lilly goes to Larry Fine's office, the recommended quirky psychiatrist-turned-veterinarian. Initially he is hesitant to help, however he listens to their story as he is neutering a dog.

Katie's death was a year ago, and Lilly says Jack is institutionalized because he has had difficulty handling it. As she had already mentioning the furniture purging to Larry, he questions if she is managing it well. Then he reiterates Lilly would be better off seeking another therapist, yet is available if she needs a vet.

In a facility art class, the residents are using potting wheels. Jack is triggered upon coming across remnants from a children's classroom while seeking a tool in a corner, so leaves abruptly.

After another starling attack, Lilly has Dr. Larry treat her wounds. They form a bond as they help each other acknowledge and confront their problems. He helps her with the bird whilst embedding ways to help her grieve into their conversations.

Jack periodically calls without speaking. Lilly monologues to her uncommunicative husband about her doings, until she mentions Katie in passing, so he hangs up upset.

The obsessed Lilly is talked into poisoning a bird feeder to exterminate the starling. Reminded other creatures might accidentally die, she hurries home early, only to find a different bird dead. Lilly remorsefully buries it, taking down the feeder.

Jack continues to be uncooperative in private sessions, admitting he feels lost yet unable to snap out of it. At Lilly's next run-in with the bird, she protects her head with a football helmet. She talks to it, but it eventually flies off. When a shower starts, Lilly puts on some music and sits on the porch.

Lilly walks to Larry's place in the rain. It is filled with an array of creatures. There, Lilly reveals she thwarted Jack's suicide attempt by carbon monoxide in the garage, after which he was committed. Larry says she blames herself and needs to tell Jack.

On a visit to the facility while voicing guilt for Katie's death, Lilly inadvertently reveals she purged Katie's things with the furniture. Upset, Jack storms off, then refuses to see her the following week, although it is a long drive.

Lily climbs a ladder to look into the nest finding one of Katie's socks that she left on the veranda. The starling swoops her and she falls off the ladder landing on her back.

Jack has a meltdown at the facility and Lilly gets sent home from work after messing up prices in the store.

Lilly is sitting in the garden when the starling swoops, she picks up a stone and throws it, badly hurting the starling. She takes the starling to Larry and asks him for help. Nursing it back to health, when the bird recovers, Lilly lets it go. She and the bird start to tolerate instead of abuse each other.

Jack calls again without speaking, so Lilly chews him out, telling him that once he is back home she will insist they always communicate. Then she announces she is hanging up in retaliation. The call makes him laugh.

Soon Jack returns home. They reconcile and work on their relationship, facing the world together. The film ends with both wearing football helmets going to get cucumbers from the garden. The starling and its new mate fly towards them and swoop them as usual.

== Cast ==
- Melissa McCarthy as Lilly Maynard
- Chris O'Dowd as Jack Maynard
- Kevin Kline as Dr. Larry Fine
- Kim Quinn as Regina
- Skyler Gisondo as Dickie
- Loretta Devine as Velma
- Timothy Olyphant as Travis Delp
- Daveed Diggs as Ben
- Rosalind Chao as Fawn
- Ravi Kapoor as Dr. Manmohan
- Laura Harrier as Sherri
- Emily Tremaine as Alice
- Scott MacArthur as Ralph the Trucker
- Elisabeth Rohm as Nancy Rothwelder
- Veronica Falcón as Rosario Alvarez
- Brock Brenner as Dillon
- Edi Patterson as Margie
- Dan Bakkedahl as Chuck
- Don McManus as Big Daddy

== Production ==
Already back in 2005, The Starling appeared on the first "Black List", an annual survey of most-liked unproduced screenplays. In March 2017, it was reported that Dome Karukoski was attached to direct the film, with Keanu Reeves and Isla Fisher in negotiations to star.

In June 2019, it was announced that Melissa McCarthy and Chris O'Dowd would star in the film, with Theodore Melfi directing. The three previously worked together on St. Vincent (2014). In August 2019, Kevin Kline, Timothy Olyphant, Daveed Diggs, Skyler Gisondo, Loretta Devine, Laura Harrier, Rosalind Chao, and Kimberly Quinn joined the cast.

Principal photography began in New York City on August 2, 2019 and wrapped on September 19.

== Reception ==
On the review aggregator website Rotten Tomatoes, the film holds an approval rating of 19% based on 94 reviews, with an average rating of 4.20/10. The website's critical consensus reads, "Burying its talented cast and worthy themes under mounds of heavy-handed melodrama, The Starling is a turkey." Metacritic gave the film a weighted average score of 31 out of 100 based on 23 critics, indicating "generally unfavorable reviews".

Peter Bradshaw of The Guardian gave the film a score of 1/5 stars, writing that the film "is so staggeringly peculiar and bad that it almost has some value as a kind of Dadaist event, a synthesis of non-meaning, a randomly generated heart-warmer movie that has come chuntering out of the printer as a result of an experimental computer program." Clarisse Loughrey of The Independent also gave the film a score of 1/5 stars, describing it as "an utterly bizarre, tonal misfire that fumbles through several ideas before implying that it's perfectly OK to berate the suicidal for being so suicidal", and wrote: "Not only are the jokes in Matt Harris's script badly timed, but they're also largely incomprehensible – there's an extended bit about a leg-humping dog and several caricatures of the mentally ill that all feel like half-remembered approximations of Oscar bait." Johanna Schneller of The Globe and Mail gave the film a score of 1.5/4 stars, writing: "Director Theodore Melfi, who did a fine job with Hidden Figures, focuses his energies here on leaden metaphors, especially a persistent CGI starling, which represents … no one cares what." Caryn James of The Hollywood Reporter described the film as being "so slushily sentimental it makes the typical tearjerker look like a noir."

Kevin Maher of The Times was more positive in his review of the film, giving it a score of 4/5 stars and writing: "The enjoyment of watching this modest melodrama is implicitly connected to a giddy acknowledgement that there remains a bold class of film-maker willing to blow $20 million on a low-key tale of grief for grown-ups." Adam Graham of The Detroit News gave the film a grade of B, writing that it "handles grief in a mature way that is relatable for adult viewers in the mood for a small film about human issues", and concluded that the film "isn't exactly subtle … but there is warmth and truth in its performances, particularly McCarthy and O'Dowd."
