= Don Handfield =

American filmmaker, author, and producer

Don Handfield is an American filmmaker, author, and producer.

== Education and acting career ==
Handfield studied theater and film at Ohio State University, graduating with a degree in journalism in 1993. His first job in media was as a production assistant at E! Entertainment Television. After moving to Los Angeles, he started his acting career, which included the role of Dwight Tanner, (Robert Duvall's son) in the 1998 film Deep Impact, and Pete Bradley in the 1997 film Defying Gravity. His films as an actor also include Captain Jack, Cause N' Effect, and A Reason to Believe. He has also appeared on television, including the shows Saved by the Bell: The New Class, Profiler, and JAG.

== Directing, producing, and writing ==
Don Handfield is a partner of the film production company The Combine, which he founded with actor Jeremy Renner. In 2005 he wrote and produced the short film My Name Is..., which was awarded the Grand Jury Prize for a Narrative Short at the 2005 Atlanta Film Festival, which qualified the film for consideration by the Academy Awards. That year he was named Filmmaker Magazine as one of the "25 new faces of independent film".

In 2012 the film Touchback was written and directed by Handfield, starring actors Kurt Russell and Brian Presley. It was the first movie to film scenes inside Ohio Stadium during a live football game. The film was his first major motion picture as screenwriter and director. He was also the author of the novel Touchback, based on the movie, which has received a starred review from Publishers Weekly. He was the writer of the UPN television series Seven Days. In 2011 he was announced as the screenwriter and producer for the Paramount film Slingshot. In 2013 he was set to produce the film Aztec Warrior.

Handfield produced The Founder, starring Michael Keaton, Nick Offerman, Laura Dern, John Carroll Lynch and Linda Cardellini. The film came about after Handfield tracked down the family of Richard "Dick" McDonald, one of the creators of the famous fast food chain, and optioned the McDonald brothers life rights.

Handfield is the co-creator and Executive Producer of the History Channel scripted series Knightfall from A & E Studios.

== Lawsuit ==
Producer Ryan A. Brooks sued Handfield, Malpaso Productions (Clint Eastwood's production company), Warner Brothers, UTA and Randy Brown for copyright infringement, who claiming the film "Trouble with the Curve" was based on a screenplay Brooks owned. Brooks' lawsuit was dismissed by the court, after the judge deemed it "frivolous" and "insulting".

== Filmography ==
Year	Film	Director	Producer	Writer	Actor	Notes
1995	Captain Jack				Yes	Played the character Zack
1995	A Reason to Believe				Yes	Played the character Nuj
1997	Defying Gravity				Yes	Played the character Pete Bradley
1998	Cause N' Defect				Yes	Played the character Danny Baker
1998	Deep Impact				Yes	Played the character Dwight Tanner
1999	Captain Jack				Yes	Played the character Dave
2005	Inside/Out				Yes	Played the character Shrink #2
2011	Touchback	Yes		Yes		
2013	Aztec Warrior		Yes			
2013	Slingshot		Yes	Yes		
2014	Kill the Messenger		Yes			
2016	The Founder		Yes			
