= Defying Gravity (1997 film) =

- Directed by: John Keitel
- Written by: John Keitel
- Produced by: Jack Koll; David Clayton Miller
- Starring: Daniel Chilson; Niklaus Lange; Don Handfield; Linna Carter
- Cinematography: Tom Harting
- Edited by: Matthew Yagle
- Distributed by: Wolfe Video
- Release date: 1997
- Running time: 92 minutes
- Country: United States
- Language: English

Defying Gravity is a 1997 independent romantic drama film directed by John Keitel and starring Daniel Chilson, Niklaus Lange, Don Handfield, and Linna Carter. Filmed in 13 days, using a cast largely of first-time actors, the film played the gay and lesbian film festival circuit in 1997 and 1998. It was Keitel's first film as a writer-director.

== Plot ==
John "Griff" Griffith, an average college student, is active in his fraternity and lives in the frat house. He has a bunk bed in the room he shares with his best friend Todd Bently, Doogie and his pledge Stewy. Another of his fraternity brothers, Pete Bradley, has moved out of the frat house and into a house he shares with other students. Griff and Pete have a secret sexual relationship, but Griff's close-knit fraternity life puts a strain on it. Griff is satisfied with the arrangement, but Pete is not. Griff, Doogie, Todd, and Heather are studying at the library. Pete is also there browsing the stacks and overhears Griff inviting girl flirt Gretchen to a fraternity party. Pete storms out of the library with Griff quickly following. Griff tackles Pete and straddles him and asks, "What's your problem?" and "Come on Pete, what do you want from me?" Pete tells Griff that you're my problem and tells him, "I want to wake up next to you, read the newspaper, and maybe go out on a date." Griff realizes that Pete is ready to break up with him so Griff quickly agrees to go on a date with Pete.

Griff is annoyed when he discovers that he is meeting Pete at a gay coffeehouse. He runs into Sam, an out, loud, and proud activist, who is passing out flyers for a "community action patrol" to help prevent gay bashing. The juxtaposition of "closeted" and "out" gay people heightens the drama and serves as comic relief at the same time. The "date" ends with Griff telling Pete that he wants no part of the lifestyle displayed by the coffeehouse's clientele. They both leave and separate in anger with Pete walking up a dark alley and Griff getting into his Jeep. Griff then notices a black truck, going up the alley after Pete.

The next day Griff and his fraternity brothers are amazed to find out that Pete has been viciously attacked and is comatose in the local hospital. Griff is obviously shocked and disoriented, but the others are concerned about the negative impact on their upcoming rush week of having a gay member of their fraternity. At a special "house meeting", Buchanan, the head of the house, tells the others that there is a criminal investigation of Pete's attack. The response of some of the fraternity brothers is anything but sympathetic to Pete.

When Griff and Todd go to the hospital to see about Pete, they are questioned by Detective Horne, who is investigating the attack, but Griff is silent about being with Pete that night because he would be outing himself at the same time. His deep love for Pete is apparent moments before when he breaks down silently in a stall in the men's room.

The tragic situation completely changes Griff: he drifts along in a daze, ignoring his friends, classwork, and fraternity responsibilities. He goes to the coffeehouse, the hospital, the place where Pete was attacked, and Pete's home. He finally meets Pete's female house-mate Rachel, played by Katrina Holden Bronson. Griff asks Rachel if it's okay to get some of Pete's stuff to take to the hospital so he will have something when he's ready to come home. Rachel lets Griff know that Pete really cares about him a lot. Rachel allows Griff in Pete's room where Griff and Pete have spent much time together. At the coffeehouse he sees Denetra, an African American fellow student, and his need to talk with a sympathetic listener motivates him to become friends with her.

Griff's continued preoccupation over Pete causes him to forget what he needs to do for the rush party: make sure that the house is well-stocked with alcohol and contact a sorority to invite them to the party. An emotional confrontation between the head of the house and Griff has Todd decide to take a time out with his troubled friend.

They drive up into the mountains for the night, and the next morning Todd and Griff are reminiscing about their hikes in the mountains with Pete. Todd finally asks Griff, "Are you like in love with him dude?" Griff admits to Todd that he has never been so sure of anything as his love for Pete. He then voices his disgust for the way he treated Pete just before he was attacked. Because his failure to give important information to the police was another way he betrayed Pete, he and Todd go right to the police station so that Griff can tell Detective Horne that he was with Pete just before he was attacked and that he saw a black truck going up the alley after him. Pete's father Mr. Bradley has a brief encounter with Griff in the hospital waiting room and sternly tells Griff to never let his son down again.

When Griff and Todd get back to the frat house they see Doogie's friend Smitty there with his black truck. Griff realizes that that was the truck that followed Pete, and Todd remembers that Doogie and Stewy were with Smitty the night Pete was attacked. They were Pete's attackers. Stewy admits to the attack when Griff confronts Doogie in the game room. A surprised Denetra walks by the frat house while the police escort Doogie and Stewy out in handcuffs.

There is nothing left for Griff to do but move out of the fraternity house and into Pete's place. Griff is called when Pete comes out of his coma. Griff rushes to the hospital to find Pete awake with this parents at his side. Mrs. Bradley has realized that Griff and Pete are really close and convinces Mr. Bradley to join her in the reception area for some coffee so Griff can be alone with Pete. Mr. Bradley shakes Griff's hand and tells him that it's nice to see you again. When he is alone with Pete Griff promises him that what happened will never happen again, and he tells Pete he needs his help in figuring things out as they make their life together.

When Pete has fully recovered he and Griff double-date with Todd and Heather at a football game. As couples they appear detached from the fraternity group that is barbecuing near the stadium. Denetra drives up with her date Loretta, whom Heather knows from her English class, and they all go to the game together. In the final scene, which follows during the course of the credits, Pete is shown reading in bed with Griff playfully joining him: Pete's dream becomes a reality.

== Cast ==
- Daniel Chilson as John 'Griff' Griffith
- Niklaus Lange as Todd Bentley
- Don Handfield as Pete Bradley
- Linna Carter as Denetra Washington
- Seabass Diamond as Matthew 'Doogie' McDougal
- Lesley Tesh as Heather
- Ryan Tucker as Gary Buchanan
- Nicki Aycox as Gretchen (credited Nicki Lynn Aycox)
- Erika Cohen as Detective Horne
- Laura Fox as Mrs. Bradley
- Kevin P. Wright as Mr. Bradley
- Matt Steveley as Stewart 'Stewy' Hanson
- Steven Burrill as Smitty
- Renee Kelly (billed Renee Eloise) as Loretta
- David Tuchman as Logan Franklin
- Nick Spano as Bozzy
- Jess Martell as Scotty
- Katrina Holden Bronson as Rachel
- Kevin Spirtas as Bartender

== Awards ==
Wins

- Austin Gay & Lesbian International Film Festival aGLIFF Award Best Narrative 1997
- Austin Gay & Lesbian International Film Festival aGLIFF Award Best Narrative Feature 1997
- Cinequest San Jose Film Festival Audience Favorite Choice Award 1997
- Cinequest San Jose Film Festival Audience Favorite Choice Award 1998

Nominations

- Verzaubert – International Gay & Lesbian Film Festival Rosebud Award Best Film 1998

== Reception ==
Defying Gravity received mixed reviews. On Rotten Tomatoes it has an approval rating of 68% based on reviews from 6 critics. On Metacritic it has a score of 45 out of 100, based on 7 reviews.

Lawrence Van Gelder from The New York Times on 9 July 1999 stated the movie "plods along, never catching dramatic fire, sometimes suffering from amateurish acting and often relying on its intrusive and treacly music to impart mood and rhythm" and "good intentions don't necessarily make good drama". Emanuel Levy from Variety on 29 June 1997 said "modestly agreeable feature directorial debut" and it was "made with a good deal of charm". Mick LaSalle from San Francisco Chronicle on 16 July 1999 noted with "more editing", it "could be a much better movie. It's a decent second-rate picture". Wesley Morris from San Francisco Examiner on 16 July 1999 wrote on "a budget so low the shoes seem to have walked off and left their strings", and it "is ransacked by its public-service announcement performances".

Lasha from gaybook.reviews in 2011 gave the film 3.5 stars out of 5, and said "moving film about what it means to be true to yourself".

== Home media ==
Defying Gravity was released on Region 1 DVD on April 11, 2000.
