= El Camino Christmas =

- Film poster
- Directed by: David E. Talbert
- Written by: Christopher Wehner; Theodore Melfi
- Produced by: Kimberly Quinn; Theodore Melfi
- Starring: Luke Grimes; Vincent D'Onofrio; Dax Shepard; Kurtwood Smith; Michelle Mylett; Emilio Rivera; Kimberly Quinn; Jessica Alba; Tim Allen
- Cinematography: Tim Suhrstedt
- Edited by: Troy Takaki
- Music by: Christopher Lennertz
- Production companies: Goldenlight Films; Brother
- Distributed by: Netflix
- Release date: December 8, 2017
- Running time: 89 minutes
- Country: United States
- Language: English

El Camino Christmas is a 2017 American comedy film directed by David E. Talbert and written by Theodore Melfi and Christopher Wehner. The film stars Luke Grimes, Vincent D'Onofrio, Dax Shepard, Kurtwood Smith, Michelle Mylett, Emilio Rivera, Kimberly Quinn, Jessica Alba, Tim Allen and Jimmy O. Yang.

In a fictitious Nevada town, a young man (Luke Grimes) seeks out the father (Tim Allen) he has never met and ends up barricaded in a liquor store with five other people on Christmas Eve. There is much turmoil, and back and forth between all involved. After an extended shootout, a "hero" emerges.

The film was released on Netflix on December 8, 2017.

== Plot ==
Young man Eric Norris seeks out his lifetime estranged father in the fictitious El Camino, Nevada.

El Camino County Sheriff Bob Fuller reprimands local Deputy Carl Hooker for not preventing a meth lab explosion, although being forewarned, also for laziness, harassment and not protecting the public. Deputy Billy Calhoun checks Eric into the motel and, with Carl, treats him with suspicion. This is for being from Missouri, his card being declined and what he buys in the shop.

Kate Daniels is the young, single mother who works in the shop. Her five-year-old Seth is still not talking. Told he could be 'on the spectrum', Kate is confident he will speak once ready.

Eric peruses an old letter and photograph before eating at the diner. Overhearing Kate tell Seth they cannot afford cake; he quietly buys him some. Later, when Eric is in the shop, a distrustful Kate attends him. After realising he is genuinely kind, she thanks him.

Eric finally approaches the address on the letter. Seeking Michael Roth, the belligerent 'Larry ' sends him off. Then, supposedly to talk about Michael, he gets Eric to pay for drinks. However, he learns next to nothing so leaves, disgusted.

At the motel, the deputies confront Eric. Finding Drano and 'Larry's' weed in his car, they decide they have probable cause. At the station, Carl accuses Eric of making meth. He declares his innocence but is beaten badly.

In the morning, realising Carl overstepped, Deputy Calhoun leaves Eric his car keys and the cell ajar, suggesting he quietly leave. Meanwhile, the perpetually inebriated Carl pops into Vincente's, where Kate and Seth are fixing the cooler.

Carl reaches the motel just as Eric is leaving. Believing he is a fugitive, he makes chase. Eric escapes, however Carl shoots the radiator, so the young man must hide. Entering the liquor store-shop to buy water for the radiator, Carl catches up to him, shooting wildly.

Carl enters the store wielding his gun so 'Larry', who is buying beer, shoots him in the leg. The officer continues to threaten Eric. Larry then slides Carl's gun to him, so he gets the officer to cuff himself, then goes out back to think. There, the recently arrived County Sheriff's gun goes off. The deputy and Sheriff exchange gunfire until they realize they are shooting at each other and not a perpetrator inside.

So, Eric is barricaded in the liquor store-shop with five others on what is now Christmas Eve. The police never know who is inside, nor who is a hostage or in charge. Eric tells everyone he came to find his long-estranged father, as his mother passed recently.

Larry passes around a 6-pack of beer, breaking out into a Christmas carol. Eric and Kate bond while waiting for Seth in the bathroom. Later he connects with the boy over a toy.

After an extended shootout started by the cops to end things before the feds arrive, Carl pulls out his concealed gun, shooting Eric who shoots him dead. Vincente gets up to convince the police to cease fire, also getting shot.

The Vietnam vet Larry takes charge, treating Eric's bullet wound. He talks about how he got court-marshalled. Eric chimes in, as he had read about it in the letters to his mother. Larry admits being wrong for abandoning his wife and child.

As Kate and Seth go free, Eric's dad says she and Eric look good together. When Eric hands the boy his remote control car, Seth says his first words, as he and his mom walk into the first flurries in Nevada in 40 years.

Eric says what he wants for Christmas is to be able to leave, so 'Larry' says he can right many wrongs as he wipes the guns of prints. Saying it was nice meeting him, he tosses Eric his 'Michael Roth' dog tags. Then, before Eric can stop him, the anti-hero emerges guns blazing to commit suicide by cop to free him.

Six months later, the survivors of the Christmas ordeal are doing well. Sheriff Fuller has retired, Deputy Calhoun is running for sheriff and the miraculous survivor of four bullets, Vincente, retired with millions in indemnity. Eric meets with Kate and Seth in the El Camino diner, the boy now speaking regularly.

== Cast ==
- Luke Grimes as Eric Norris
- Tim Allen as Larry Roth
- Vincent D'Onofrio as Carl Hooker
- Dax Shepard as Deputy Billy Calhoun
- Kurtwood Smith as Bob Fuller, Sheriff of El Camino County
- Michelle Mylett as Kate Daniels
- Emilio Rivera as Vicente Santos
- Kimberly Quinn as Jewels Daniels
- Jessica Alba as Beth Flowers
- Jimmy O. Yang as Mike the Cameraman

== Production ==
According to screenwriter Theodore Melfi, the project had been in development for ten years before principal photography began on May 1, 2017, in Los Angeles.

== Release ==
The film was released on Netflix on December 8, 2017.

== Reception ==
According to the review aggregator website Rotten Tomatoes, 40% of critics have given the film a positive review based on 5 reviews, with an average rating of 2.73/10.
