= Michelle Mylett =

Canadian actress

- Born: Robyn Michelle Mylett; January 4, 1989 (age 37); Ladysmith, British Columbia, Canada
- Occupation: Actor
- Years active: 2013–present

Robyn Michelle Mylett (born January 4, 1989) is a Canadian actress. She is best known for her role as Katy on the comedy series Letterkenny (2016–2023).

== Early life ==
Mylett was raised in Ladysmith, a town on Vancouver Island in British Columbia, Canada. She has an older brother, Richard, and a cousin, Mikayla Mary.

== Career ==
Her first professional acting job was in the 2013 film Antisocial. She subsequently appeared in the films The Drownsman and She Stoops to Conquer, as well as supporting roles in the television series Ascension, The Strain, and Lost Girl. Later roles are: in the television series Four in the Morning, Bad Blood, and the films Kiss and Cry, The Curse of Buckout Road, El Camino Christmas, and as Elle in Was I Really Kidnapped.

Mylett's most prominent role was as Katy, a leading character on the television series Letterkenny. For her work on it, she was nominated for a Canadian Screen Award for Best Actress in a Comedy Series at the 8th Canadian Screen Awards in 2020.

September 16th, 2026 she was announced as part of the Heated Rivalry season 2 cast playing the part of Dr. Lisa Hayes.

Mylett has also starred in The Complex, a video game in full-motion video, by Wales Interactive. In 2022 she joined Peter Dinklage and Shirley MacLaine in the dark comedy film American Dreamer.

== Personal life ==
Mylett resides in British Columbia with boyfriend Connor Head and her dog, Clementine.
