= Laura Jacqmin =

American dramatist

- Occupations: Television writer, Playwright, Video game writer

Laura Jacqmin is a Los Angeles–based television writer, playwright, and video game writer from Shaker Heights, Ohio. She was the winner of the 2008 Wasserstein Prize, a $25,000 award given to recognize an emerging female playwright.

== Biography ==
Jacqmin attended Shaker Heights High School in Cleveland, Ohio. After high school, Jacqmin attended Yale, then went on to receive her Master of Fine Arts degree in Playwriting from Ohio University.

Jacqmin is one of the founding members of The Kilroys, based in Los Angeles. The group came to be in 2014 when they released a list of some of the top un-produced or underproduced plays by female, trans and NB playwrights in an effort to increase gender parity in the American theater.

== Awards ==
- 2008, Wasserstein Prize

== Filmography ==
=== Television ===
Key
†	Denotes television productions that have not yet been released

Year	Title	Writer	Executive Producer	Network	Notes
2015	Grace and Frankie	Yes	No	Netflix	
2018–2019	Get Shorty	Yes	Supervising	Epix	
2022	Joe vs. Carole	Yes	Consulting	Peacock	
2023	One Piece	Yes	Co-executive	Netflix	
2026	Ride or Die	Yes	Co-executive	Amazon Prime Video	

=== Film ===
- We Broke Up – Screenwriter with Jeff Rosenberg

=== Video games ===
- Minecraft: Story Mode: Telltale Games (2015)

== Plays ==
- Dental Society Midwinter Meeting (2010, world premiere)
- A Third (2015, world premiere)
- Residence (2015)
- We're Going To Be Fine (2015, world premiere)
- Look, we are breathing (2015, world premiere)
- Ghost Bike (2014, world premiere)
- Milvotchkee, Visconsin (2013/2014, co-world premiere)
- Before You Ruin It (2014, academic premiere)
- Do-Gooder (2014, world premiere)
- January Joiner (2013, world premiere)
- And When We Awoke There Was Light and Light (2012, world premiere)
- Dead Pile (2012)
- Ski Dubai (2009, world premiere)
- Two Lakes, Two Rivers (2012)
- Pluto Was a Planet (2008)
- Airborne
- 10 Virgins
- Happyslap

== Workshops and residencies ==
- Williamstown Theatre Festival – Fellowship Project, 2015
- Cape Cod Theatre Project, 2015
- SDC Guest Artist residency at Arizona State University, spring 2014
- Faith Broome playwright in residence at University of Oklahoma, fall 2012
- O’Neill National Playwrights Conference, summer 2012
- Old Vic/New Voices US/UK Exchange, summer 2012
- MacDowell Colony Fellowship, 2011
- Royal Court Theatre’s International Residency, 2011
- Cape Cod Theatre Project, 2011
- Theater of the First Amendment’s First Light Festival, 2011
- Lark Theatre’s Playwrights Week, 2010
- Sundance Theatre Lab, 2010
- Icicle Creek Theatre Festival, 2010
- P73’s Yale residency, 2010
- MacDowell Colony Fellowship, 2009
- Writer in residence at the Marcel Breuer House: Rockefeller Brothers Estate, sponsored by Page 73 and the Rockefeller Brothers Fund, 2009
- Residency in Applied Arts at the Center for Age and Community at University of Wisconsin-Milwaukee, 2009

== Awards, honors, and grants ==
- Finalist, 2015 Heideman Award for Post-Apocalypto
- Longlisted, Theatre503 Playwriting Award for A Third
- Awardee, 2014 NEA Art Works grant for world premiere production of Milvotchkee, Visconsin
- Winner, 2013 Kennedy Center David Mark Cohen Playwriting Award
- Awardee, 2013 NEA Art Works grant for world premiere production of January Joiner
- Finalist, 2013 Laurents/Hatcher Prize
- Shortlisted, 2012 BBC International Radio Playwriting Competition
- Finalist, 2010–13 Heideman Award
- Finalist, 2008 and 2011 Princess Grace Award
- Finalist, 2011 P73 Playwriting Fellowship
- Member of the Goodman Theatre’s 2010–11 Playwrights’ Unit
- Nominee, 2011 Cherry Lane Mentor Project
- Awarded 2009 Union League Club Civic & Arts Foundation’s Emerging Playwright Award
- Winner/finalist for Aurora Theatre Company’s 2007 and 2009 Global Age Project
- Winner of the 2008 Wasserstein Prize, a $25,000 award given by the Dramatists Guild and the Educational Foundation of America to an emerging female playwright (for And when we awoke there was light and light)

=== Commissions ===
- DePaul University School of Theater, 2014
- Victory Gardens Theater/NNPN, 2012
- South Coast Rep, 2011
- Carthage College, 2011
- Goodman Theatre, 2010
- Arden Theatre Company, 2010
- InterAct Theatre, 2010
- Ensemble Studio Theatre/Alfred P. Sloan Foundation Science and Technology Project, 2010
- Foundation for Jewish Culture: New Jewish Theatre Projects Grant, 2008
- Victory Gardens Theater, 2007
