= Winding Roads (film) =

1999 American film directed by Theodore Melfi

- Directed by: Theodore Melfi
- Written by: Theodore Melfi; Kimberly Quinn
- Produced by: Theodore Melfi; Bryan Godwin
- Starring: Kimberly Quinn; Katrina Holden Bronson; Rachel Hunter; James Marsters; Adam Scott; Michael Weatherly; Carlos Gomez
- Cinematography: Bryan Godwin
- Edited by: Vaughn Juares
- Music by: Brahm Wenger
- Production company: Goldenlight Films
- Release dates: October 8, 1999 (Austin Film Festival); September 14, 2000 (Springfield, Missouri)
- Running time: 90 minutes
- Country: United States
- Language: English
- Budget: $400,000

Winding Roads is a 1999 American independent drama film produced and directed by Theodore Melfi in his feature directorial debut. Melfi wrote the screenplay with his future wife, actress Kimberly Quinn, who stars in the film with Katrina Holden Bronson and Rachel Hunter. James Marsters, Adam Scott, Michael Weatherly and Carlos Gomez co-star. The story centers on three women, all best friends, navigating their respective love lives.

Winding Roads was filmed in late 1998 in Springfield, Missouri, and produced through Melfi and Quinn's company Goldenlight Films. It was screened at the 1999 Austin Film Festival, premiered in Springfield on September 14, 2000, and was later shown in theaters in the Midwest.

== Cast ==
- Kimberly Quinn as Rene Taylor
- Katrina Holden Bronson as Sam Stafford
- Rachel Hunter as Kelly Simons
- James Marsters as Billy Johnson
- Adam Scott as Brian Calhoun
- Michael Weatherly as Mick Simons
- Carlos Gomez as Jesus

== Release ==
Winding Roads was screened on October 8 and 10, 1999, at the sixth annual Austin Film Festival. As a means of attracting a potential distributor, a private industry screening for 450 guests was held at 20th Century Fox Studios in Hollywood on April 12, 2000. The world premiere of Winding Roads took place on September 14, 2000, at the Wehrenberg Theatres Campbell 16 in Springfield, Missouri, where it played for the next two weeks. The film's theatrical release — including a two-week run at the GQT Forum 8 theater in Columbia, Missouri in March 2001 — was orchestrated entirely by Melfi.

The film made its cable premiere on Showtime (where it had "a long life") and the Independent Film Channel.
