= The Drownsman =

- Directed by: Chad Archibald
- Written by: Chad Archibald; Cody Calahan
- Starring: Michelle Mylett; Caroline Korycki; Gemma Bird Matheson
- Cinematography: Marc Forand
- Edited by: Nick Montgomery
- Music by: Steph Copeland
- Production companies: Black Fawn Films; Breakthrough Entertainment
- Distributed by: Breakthrough Entertainment
- Release date: August 2, 2014 (Fantasia Film Festival)
- Running time: 88 minutes
- Country: Canada
- Language: English

The Drownsman is a 2014 Canadian horror/fantasy thriller that was directed by Chad Archibald, who co-wrote the script with Cody Calahan. The film had its world premiere on 2 August 2014 at the Fantasia Film Festival and stars Michelle Mylett as a hydrophobic young woman that finds that the cure might be worse than the fear itself. Filming took place in Guelph, Ontario during winter of 2013.

== Plot ==
A near-death experience in a lake leaves Madison (Michelle Mylett) with extreme hydrophobia. It's grown so bad that she's unable to attend her best friend Hannah's (Caroline Korycki) wedding because of the rain, as Madison believes that a sinister figure known as the Drownsman (Ry Barrett) will pull her into his world and kill her. In their attempt to help her, Madison's friends try to hold a seance to make contact with this being and find that Madison is being haunted by Sebastian Donner (also played by Barrett), a serial killer that loved to listen to his victims' hearts beat as they slowly died. However the group soon finds that their attempts to help Madison has caused the Drownsman to notice them as well and he begins to pick them off one by one.

== Cast ==
- Michelle Mylett as Madison
- Caroline Korycki as Hannah
- Gemma Bird Matheson as Kobie
- Sydney Kondruss as Lauren
- Clare Bastable as Cathryn
- Ry Barrett as The Drownsman / Sebastian Donner
- JoAnn Nordstrom as Isabelle Heller
- Samuel Borstein as Henley Jacobs
- Derrek Peels as Carter
- Breanne TeBoekhorst as Julia
- Katie Nicole Evans as Young Isabelle Heller

== Reception ==
Nerdly gave The Drownsman three out of five stars, writing "As an homage to the works of Carpenter, Craven et al. it works. As a origin story for a new franchise villain it works. As a movie? Well if you're willing to ignore the odd flaw even in the films own internal logic like I did, then The Drownsman works. If not…" Twitch Film gave a mixed review, commenting that the film "made a valiant effort to bring itself around with strong visuals and a decent villain kill. It did not fully recover for me, but I still enjoyed the ride for the 'moist' part".
