= Get Shorty (film) =

1995 comedy film directed by Barry Sonnenfeld

- Theatrical release poster
- Directed by: Barry Sonnenfeld
- Screenplay by: Scott Frank
- Based on: Get Shorty by Elmore Leonard
- Produced by: Danny DeVito; Michael Shamberg; Stacey Sher
- Starring: John Travolta; Gene Hackman; Rene Russo; Danny DeVito
- Cinematography: Donald Peterman
- Edited by: Jim Miller
- Music by: John Lurie
- Production companies: Metro-Goldwyn-Mayer Pictures; Jersey Films
- Distributed by: MGM/UA Distribution Co. (United States); United International Pictures (International)
- Release date: October 20, 1995
- Running time: 105 minutes
- Country: United States
- Language: English
- Budget: $30 million
- Box office: $115.1 million

Get Shorty is a 1995 American gangster comedy film directed by Barry Sonnenfeld and written by Scott Frank, based on Elmore Leonard's 1990 novel. The film stars John Travolta, Gene Hackman, Rene Russo, Delroy Lindo, James Gandolfini, Dennis Farina and Danny DeVito. It follows Chili Palmer (Travolta), a Miami mobster and loan shark who inadvertently gets involved with a Hollywood feature film production. Get Shorty was released on October 20, 1995 by MGM/UA Distribution Co. in the United States and by United International Pictures internationally. The film received critical acclaim and went on to gross $115.1 million against a $30 million budget. Travolta went on to win the Golden Globe Award for Best Actor – Motion Picture Musical or Comedy for his role in the film at the 53rd Golden Globe Awards. The film's success launched its titular franchise, including a sequel titled Be Cool (2005) and a television series, which debuted in 2017.

== Plot ==
Chili Palmer is a Miami-based loan shark and movie buff. When his leather jacket is taken by rival mobster Ray "Bones" Barboni, Chili retrieves it and breaks Bones' nose. Bones ambushes him at his office but Chili shoots first, grazing Bones' forehead. Bones' boss refuses to retaliate, reminding him that Chili is under the protection of Brooklyn mob boss Momo.

After Momo dies of a heart attack, Bones takes over his operation and demands that Chili collect an outstanding debt from Leo Devoe, a dry cleaner who died in a plane crash. Chili learns from Leo's wife Faye that her husband is alive, having left the plane before takeoff; she received a settlement of $300,000 but Leo ran away with the cash. Chili tracks Leo to a Las Vegas casino, where he accepts an additional job to collect a large gambling debt from B-movie director Harry Zimm.

Surprising Harry in Los Angeles at the home of scream queen Karen Flores, Chili pitches him his real-life chasing of Leo's debt as an idea for a movie. Harry persuades Chili to help him placate his investors Bo Catlett and Ronnie Wingate, who use their limo service as a drug front. Having gambled away the pair's $200,000 investment, Harry shows Chili the script he really wants to make, Mr. Lovejoy; he needs $500,000 to buy the rights from the writer Murray Saffrin's widow, Doris. Chili confronts Leo and takes his money to invest in Mr. Lovejoy, deciding to become a Hollywood producer and rejects Bo's suggestion that they collaborate.

Bo has left $500,000 in a locker at the airport for his Colombian contacts to collect. A naive gangster, Yayo Portillo, is sent to collect the money but refuses after Bo warns him that DEA agents are watching the locker. At Bo's cliffside home, Yayo threatens to inform on Bo if he is arrested with the cash; Bo shoots and kills Yayo. Bo is later visited by Mr. Escobar, a Colombian drug lord who turns out to be Yayo's uncle, who demands full repayment.

Warming to Chili, Karen also wants to become a producer and arranges a meeting with Hollywood star Martin Weir, her ex-husband. Martin is intrigued by Chili's pitch and interested in playing Chili. Sensing that Harry is jealous of Chili and too stupid to realize he is being played, Bo offers him the locker money as a new investment, suggesting he send Chili to fetch it. Sensing a trap, Chili fakes out the DEA agents while confirming the presence of the money. He gets into a confrontation with Bo's enforcer, Bear, but the situation is defused when the two men start discussing Bear's former career as a stuntman.

After being seduced by Doris, Harry drunkenly calls Bones, insults him and asks for another investment; he also reveals that Chili has Leo's money. Bones flies to Los Angeles and brutally beats Harry. When Ronnie interrupts them, Bones shoots him dead and plants the gun on Harry. Bear has a change of heart about the plan to kill Chili but Bo threatens him and his young daughter. Chili and Karen give in to their mutual attraction and the next day take a badly injured Harry to a lunch meeting with Martin.

Desperate to pay the Colombians, Bo resorts to kidnapping Karen and forcing Chili to give him Leo's money. Chili delivers the money but Bo then orders Bear to beat him to death; during the fake scuffle, Bear maneuvers Bo into falling into a railing he had loosened earlier, thus making Bo's death look like an accident. Bones breaks into Chili's hotel room and demands Leo's money at gunpoint. Chili tells him it is in the locker and Bones walks into the DEA's trap. Sometime later, production of Get Leo is underway, with Chili and Karen watching the filming and arguing with Martin's agent Buddy Lufkin about Martin's height as he portrays Chili.

== Cast ==
- John Travolta as Chili Palmer, a Miami-based loan shark under the protection of Brooklyn mob boss Momo
- Gene Hackman as Harry Zimm. Chili goes after him for a large gambling debt.
- Rene Russo as Karen Flores, Harry's girlfriend
- Danny DeVito as Martin Weir
- Dennis Farina as Ray "Bones" Barboni, Chili's rival mobster, who takes over Momo's empire when he dies
- Delroy Lindo as Bo Catlett, Harry's investor
- James Gandolfini as Bear
- David Paymer as Leo Devoe, who owes Bones money
- Martin Ferrero as Tommy Carlo
- Miguel Sandoval as Mr. Escobar
- Jon Gries as Ronnie Wingate, Harry's investor
- Linda Hart as Faye Devoe, Leo's wife
- Jacob Vargas as Yayo Portillo
- Bette Midler as Doris Saffrin, the widow of the writer of Mr. Lovejoy
- Renee Props as Nicki
- Bobby Slayton as Dick Allen
- Ron Karabatsos as Momo
- Jack Conley as Agent Dunbar
- Bernard Hocke as Agent Morgan
- Rino Piccolo as Waiter at Vesuvio's
- Alfred Dennis as Ed the Barber
- Ralph Manza as Fred the Barber
- Patrick Breen as Assistant Doctor
- Barry Sonnenfeld as Doorman
- Rebeca Arthur as Las Vegas Waitress
- Leslie Bega as Vikki Vespa (uncredited)
- David Groh as Buddy Lufkin (uncredited)
- Harvey Keitel as Himself (uncredited)
- Penny Marshall as Herself (uncredited)
- Alex Rocco as Jimmy Capp (uncredited)

Get Shorty also features an appearance from the real Ernest "Chili" Palmer, a Miami loan shark and mob-connected man who inspired the original character.

== Production ==
Warren Beatty, Dustin Hoffman and Michael Keaton were offered the role of Chili Palmer but they all declined. Barry Sonnenfeld considered Samuel L. Jackson for the role of Bo Catlett. Steve Buscemi and Matthew McConaughey were considered for the role of Ronnie Wingate.

== Soundtrack ==
The movie features an acid- and soul-jazz themed soundtrack with songs by Us3, Morphine, Booker T. & the M.G.'s, Greyboy and Medeski Martin & Wood alongside original compositions by John Lurie. The soundtrack was nominated for a Grammy Award for Best Instrumental Composition Written for a Motion Picture or for Television at the 39th Annual Grammy Awards.

== Reception ==
On Rotten Tomatoes, Get Shorty holds an approval rating of 89% based on 57 reviews, with an average rating of 7.70/10. The site's critical consensus reads, "With a perfect cast and a sly twist on the usual Hollywood gangster dynamic, Get Shorty delivers a sharp satire that doubles as an entertaining comedy-thriller in its own right." On Metacritic, the film has a weighted average score of 81 out of 100, based on 22 critics, indicating "universal acclaim". Audiences surveyed by CinemaScore gave the film an average grade "B+" on scale of A+ to F. The film was entered into the 46th Berlin International Film Festival.

The film opened at number one in the domestic box office upon its release with $12.7 million. Get Shorty remained number one for three consecutive weeks before being overtaken by Ace Ventura: When Nature Calls.

=== Accolades ===
For his role as Chili Palmer, John Travolta received the Golden Globe Award for Best Actor – Motion Picture Musical or Comedy at the 53rd Golden Globes. The film also received nominations for the Golden Globe Award for Best Motion Picture – Musical or Comedy and the Screen Actors Guild Award for Outstanding Performance by a Cast in a Motion Picture at the 2nd Screen Actors Guild Awards.

== See also ==
- Tarantinoesque film
