= Peter Steinfeld =

American screenwriter

- Born: Jersey City, New Jersey
- Education: New York University
- Occupations: Screenwriter, television producer and television director
- Spouse: DeShawn Schneider
- Children: Chloe Steinfeld, Ally Steinfeld
- Writing career
- Notable works: Drowning Mona (2000); Be Cool (2005); 21 (2008)

Peter L. Steinfeld is an American screenwriter and television producer. He is best known for writing mystery film Drowning Mona (released 2000), comedy film Be Cool (2005) and drama film 21 (2008).

== Early life ==
Steinfeld was born and raised in Wayne, New Jersey. After attending undergraduate school for eight years, he set up an unsuccessful greeting card company, later working as a forklift operator at a cosmetics company to pay off his US$40,000 of debt when his own company shut down. He completed his bachelor's degree in English literature at New York University (NYU), where he also undertook a screenwriting workshop. Students were expected to have written an entire feature film screenplay over the six-week course, but Steinfeld had only written eleven pages by the workshop's conclusion.

== Career ==
After taking the NYU workshop, Steinfeld decided to pursue screenwriting with the eleven-page screenplay he had completed: "Even though I only had those 11 pages, my feeling was, 'I'm not sure if I'm any good at it, but I love this.'" He later finished the screenplay and sold it to Neverland Films as the 2000 film Drowning Mona, starring Bette Midler and Danny DeVito. He was next signed by Warner Bros. to write the sequel to mafia comedy Analyze This, which became the 2002 film Analyze That. He next adapted Elmore Leonard's novel Be Cool into a film of the same name, released in 2005. As a fan of Leonard and Be Cool's preceding novel, Get Shorty, Steinfeld thought it "the greatest thing in the world" when Leonard was impressed by the screenplay. Steinfeld had been signed by Metro-Goldwyn-Mayer in 2003 to adapt Ben Mezrich's true crime book Bringing Down the House, about the feats of the card counting MIT Blackjack Team, into the film 21, which was released in 2008. Before filming began in 2005, screenwriter Allan Loeb was brought in to rewrite Steinfeld's script as a former gambling addict.

Steinfeld has completed an as-yet-unmade script, Ebony and Ivory, for Imagine Entertainment. Currently, he and his wife, screenwriter DeShawn Schneider, are working on high concept film The Big Shot for Plan B Entertainment and a remake of Paul Newman's 1977 film Slap Shot for Universal Pictures. He has also written and executive produced a number of television pilots, including "Pulse" and "Inspector General", which have not been picked up.

== Personal life ==
Steinfeld is married to fellow screenwriter DeShawn Schneider, with whom he has two daughters: Chloe, born 2004, and Ally, born 2006.
