= Daltry Calhoun =

- Directed by: Katrina Holden Bronson
- Written by: Katrina Holden Bronson
- Produced by: Danielle Renfrew
- Starring: Johnny Knoxville; Juliette Lewis; Elizabeth Banks; Kick Gurry; David Koechner; Sophie Traub; James Parks; Andrew Prine
- Cinematography: Matthew Irving
- Edited by: Daniel R. Padgett
- Music by: John Swihart
- Distributed by: Miramax Films
- Release date: September 20, 2005
- Running time: 100 minutes
- Country: United States
- Language: English

Daltry Calhoun is a 2005 comedy-drama film, written and directed by Katrina Holden Bronson and produced by Danielle Renfrew. It stars Johnny Knoxville as the lead character Daltry Calhoun, Elizabeth Banks as Daltry's ex-girlfriend, Sophie Traub as his estranged daughter, and David Koechner as Daltry's friend.

== Plot ==
Within a small town in Tennessee, seed and sod entrepreneur Daltry Calhoun is a local celebrity who has made a name for himself by selling locally produced turf to many of the nation's most exclusive golf courses, and his television spots are well-liked by viewers across town.

Daltry's ex-girlfriend arrives unannounced with their teenage daughter, a 14-year-old musical prodigy. She confides that her terminal illness has forced her to seek him out in hopes that he can care for their daughter after she is gone. Despite the early success of Daltry's business and the popularity of his commercials, Daltry's career has become unstable and he's forced to liquidate his assets in hopes of salvaging what he can. Now, faced with much adversity, Daltry vows to make up for lost time by doing right in the eyes of his family and community, caring for his distant daughter, and all the while getting his business back on track.

== Reception and box office ==
Daltry Calhoun received mostly negative reviews from critics, ultimately receiving a 7% score from Rotten Tomatoes, with its critics consensus stating that "watching grass grow would likely be more entertaining than this dull, slight feature about a sod salesman", and a 30% score from Metacritic.

The film had a theatrical run in a total of 13 theaters worldwide. It made a total of $7,758 in sales during its opening weekend and earned $12,551 in Total Lifetime Gross, resulting in a loss of about $2.9 million of the film's original $3 million budget.
