= Touchback (film) =

2011 American film

- Theatrical release poster
- Directed by: Don Handfield
- Written by: Don Handfield
- Produced by: Carissa Buffel; Lisa Kearns; Kevin Matusow; Brian Presley
- Starring: Brian Presley; Melanie Lynskey; Marc Blucas; Kurt Russell; Christine Lahti
- Cinematography: David Morrison
- Edited by: Ryan Eaton
- Music by: William Ross
- Production companies: Freedom Films; Emmett/Furla Films
- Distributed by: Anchor Bay Films; Bliss Media (China)
- Release date: September 28, 2011
- Running time: 120 minutes
- Country: United States
- Language: English
- Budget: $5 million
- Box office: $204,232

Touchback is a 2011 American sports film, written and directed by Don Handfield and starring Brian Presley, Melanie Lynskey, Kurt Russell, and Christine Lahti. It premiered on home video in Finland and Sweden on September 28, 2011, and had a limited theatrical run in the United States the following year. The film received mixed reviews from critics.

== Plot ==
Scott Murphy is a former high school football hero, famous as the top high school quarterback in Ohio with the nickname of "Mr. Football". A leg injury he received during the Ohio State High School Championship game terminated his scholarship to Ohio State University and his dreams of a professional career in football. It has been twenty years since that game and Scott still resides with his family in the quiet town of Coldwater, Ohio. He has a splinted leg and has been a farmer and volunteer firefighter since high school. Rather than marrying the head cheerleader, Scott has married a shy clarinet-playing band member named Macy and has two daughters. A compromised harvest and bank obligations have caused a strain on his farm, which he is in jeopardy of losing. In an upcoming football game, he is to be honored in a halftime ceremony as the quarterback who brought the team to a state championship. With bad luck around every corner, Scott is not mentally prepared for the game, and the return of his good friend Hall who made the NFL and married Scott's old high school girlfriend only adds to his depression.

An early frost and a broken soybean combine harvester doom the harvest and bring Scott to the brink. His wife, Macy, suggests that they could pick the soybeans by hand in order to bring them to market. Scott finds this far-fetched since there are 200 acres to harvest. He decides to kill himself via carbon monoxide (CO) poisoning in his truck. As he passes out, Scott wakes up back in 1991, a few days before the big game.

Scott remembers the course of his life and resolves to change events so his injury won't happen and he can take the OSU scholarship. He is anxious to get free of the small farming town, derisively called "Backwater" by the other teams. With his hindsight and knowledge of the outcome, he spends more quality time with his hard-working mother who has never seen him in a game and introduces himself to Macy whom he knows he will marry.

At a last recruiting meeting, the OSU scout admits the game will be hard and that he could get injured, so if he chooses, sitting out will not impact his invitation to joining the quarterback unit at OSU. The day of the championship game, he informs Coach Hand (played by Kurt Russell) that he will not play in the big game that will guarantee his acceptance at OSU and a bright future in football away from Coldwater. Shocked, Coach offers a speech about the merits of the people of Coldwater. Coach shares with Scott how he receives a job offer from OSU annually only to turn it down out of love for Coldwater and its citizens. After considering his coach's and his mother's feelings and his responsibility to the team, Scott decides he will play after all. Scott's efforts on the field are lackluster and they struggle to keep up. Coach Hand encourages him to share the ball with his teammates. In the second half, Scott mixes it up a bit and they finally take the lead. With "the play" imminent, Scott tells his coach he will not run the pitch-fake that he knows will cause his leg to be broken. Coach smiles and suggests a passing play, but informs Scott that based upon the Chief's defensive formation, he can call an audible as necessary, but it is his decision.

As Scott prepares to call for the hike, he looks over at his girlfriend, then out into the band bleachers, where he sees Macy and he decides. As the clock runs down, Scott calls an audible, a running play where he maneuvers himself close enough to jump into the end zone. As he crosses, Scott is hammered by two defensive players, but his leg is shattered at the knee. Coldwater wins the Ohio State High School Championship game over the heavily favored Chiefs. For the most part, Scott single-handedly beat a much bigger high school team that had eight defensive players already signed to NCAA Division I scholarships.

In the present, Scott comes to in his truck, having survived his suicide attempt due to his truck running out of gas. As he walks to town, he sees it is desolate. The game is over but even the football field is empty of any people or players. As he makes a turn for his farm, he sees his soybean field lit up and crowded with all the citizens of Coldwater. They heard about his hardship and his need for his crops to make it to market, and they have all gathered to pick the soybeans by hand. Scott embraces his life in the tight-knit community, happy about his family and friends. He also decides to be an assistant coach to his old mentor Coach Hand.

== Main cast ==
- Brian Presley as Scott Murphy
- Melanie Lynskey as Macy
- Kurt Russell as Coach Hand
- Marc Blucas as Hall
- Christine Lahti as Thelma
- Sarah Wright as Jenny
- Drew Powell as Dwight Pearson
- Kevin Covais as Todd White
- James Duval as Rodriguez
- Sianoa Smit-McPhee as Sasha

== Production ==
=== Filming ===
Filming took place during July and August 2010. The primary filming location was Coopersville, Michigan at the Coopersville High School football stadium. Additional filming occurred in Grand Rapids, Ravenna Township and River View High School in Warsaw, Ohio. One scene was also filmed in Ohio Stadium on October 23, 2010, during an Ohio State football game. Touchback marked the first time Ohio Stadium and Coopersville High School stadium had been shown in a major motion picture.

The film had limited distribution and disappointing box office sales. It was distributed domestically by Anchor Bay and in China by Bliss Media.

== Reception ==
On Rotten Tomatoes, the film has an approval rating of 38% based on reviews from 13 critics.

Joe Leydon of Variety called it "A lightweight and overlong feel-good drama that plays like a mashup of It's a Wonderful Life and Friday Night Lights."

== See also ==
- List of American football films
