= Drowning Mona =

- Theatrical release poster
- Directed by: Nick Gomez
- Written by: Peter Steinfeld
- Produced by: Al Corley
- Starring: Danny DeVito; Bette Midler; Neve Campbell; Jamie Lee Curtis; Casey Affleck; William Fichtner; Marcus Thomas; Peter Dobson
- Cinematography: Bruce Douglas Johnson
- Edited by: Richard Pearson
- Music by: Michael Tavera
- Production companies: Destination Films; Neverland Films; Jersey Films
- Distributed by: Destination Films
- Release date: March 3, 2000
- Running time: 96 minutes
- Country: United States
- Language: English
- Budget: $16 million
- Box office: $15.9 million

Drowning Mona is a 2000 American crime comedy film starring Danny DeVito as Wyatt Rash, a local police chief from Verplanck, New York, who investigates the mysterious death of Mona Dearly (Bette Midler), a spiteful, hard-drinking, loud-mouthed, abusive woman, hated by all who knew her, who drove her son's car off a cliff and drowned in a river. The film received negative reviews from critics.

== Plot ==
Mona Dearly can't unlock her car so, as her keys fit her son's Yugo, she takes that and drives off. On a bend, the brakes fail completely and she drives off a cliff into the Hudson River. Clarence, fishing in the river, sees it happen. Chief Rash observes there are no skid marks on the road.

Her long-suffering husband Phil and son Jeff, show no grief when learning of Mona's death, an abusive, belligerent heavy drinker, loved by none. (Jeff is more concerned about his car.)

Ellie (Rash's daughter) wants to celebrate as the Dearlys treated her fiancé (and Jeff's business partner) Bobby badly. JB Landscaping is not doing well due to Jeff's laziness and poor behavior.

Phil and Rona, who are having an affair, meet at the Charm Motel. He expresses happiness about Mona's death but denies involvement. Bobby meets Murph, his older brother, who has been helping him financially. Murph suspects he had a hand in Mona's death.

Rash's investigation takes him to Jeff, who claims that Bobby threatened and attacked Mona. Lucinda, the local mechanic specializing in Yugos (driven by every resident in town) informs Rash that the car Mona was driving had been tampered with in multiple ways.

Phil tells Rash he had been a battered husband, as Mona suspected he was having an affair. He also claims Jeff and Mona had had an argument on the evening before the accident. Bobby tells Rash he hated Mona and that they had had an argument over Jeff's pay. She would not let him dissolve the partnership unless Bobby bought them out. Phil and Jeff leave Mona's wake very early.

Meanwhile, Rash breaks into the Dearly's, finding that Mona's and Jeff's car keys had been switched. Phil expresses his gratitude to Bobby for killing Mona. Bobby then confesses to Ellie that he rigged Jeff's car, as Jeff was destroying their business. She then announces she is pregnant. Clarence overhears their conversation.

Phil tells Rash he spotted Bobby near the Dearly residence on the night before the accident, claiming that he did not say this earlier because Rash and Bobby will soon be family. Jeff, who is also involved with Rona, finds out about Phil's affair with her. Bobby tells Rash that Mona threatened him, not the other way around, and that he was in the Hideaway the evening before the accident, which Rash later learns is not true, despite Murph attempting to cover Bobby on this. Rash also meets up with Valerie Antonelli and notices a black eye she got from an altercation at the Hideaway the night before Mona's death. Valerie claims that neither Bobby nor Ellie were there and then shows a sharp metal object on the street that gave her a flat tire with the letters "JB" carved on it.

Phil is found dead in a pond at the Charm Motel. Murph tells Ellie, who fears that Bobby, who left their house that night, did it. When Rona finds out, she tries to leave town; she had seen Jeff approach Phil beside the pond, and now believes Jeff killed him.

Police learn that Jeff is threatening suicide because of Rona's leaving. He reveals that a drunken Mona had unrepentantly chopped off his hand when they fought over a bottle of beer. He also states that Phil was not his biological father, adding that, despite all that, he did not kill either of them. Chief Rash manages to take the gun away from Jeff.

Rash then tells Bobby privately that Clarence confessed to killing Phil, further confessing that he had witnessed Phil watch Bobby's unsuccessful attempt to sabotage Jeff's brakes (Bobby only damaged a meaningless valve), and then saw Phil do a proper sabotage and switch the keys in the house to ensure Mona would drive it in the morning. Clarence killed Phil to rid the town of a murderer while also preventing Phil from likely pulling Bobby down with him by revealing the cursory attempt to kill Jeff.

Chief Rash promises Bobby to keep quiet about Bobby's involvement as long as he takes good care of Ellie and the baby. Bobby and Ellie get married and Clarence is taken away.

== Cast ==
- Danny DeVito as Chief Wyatt Rash
- Bette Midler as Mona Dearly
- Neve Campbell as Ellen Rash
- Jamie Lee Curtis as Rona Mace
- Casey Affleck as Bobby Calzone
- William Fichtner as Phil Dearly
- Marcus Thomas as Jeff Dearly
- Peter Dobson as Eugene "Feege" Gruman
- Kathleen Wilhoite as Lucinda
- Tracey Walter as Clarence
- Paul Ben-Victor as Tony Carlucci
- Paul Schulze as Jimmy D.
- Mark Pellegrino as Murph Calzone
- Raymond O'Connor as Father Tom
- Lisa Rieffel as Valerie Antonelli
- Brian Doyle-Murray as Tow Truck Driver
- Will Ferrell as Cubby
- Melissa McCarthy as Shirley

== Reception ==
=== Box office ===
In the United States and Canada, Drowning Mona grossed $15.5 million, and $0.4 million in other territories, for a worldwide total of $15.9 million, against a budget of $26 million. It opened at No. 4, its first of two consecutive weeks in the Top 10 at the domestic box office.

=== Critical response ===
On the review aggregator website Rotten Tomatoes, 29% of 76 critics' reviews are positive, with an average rating of 4.4/10. The website's consensus reads: "A whodunnit that stacks its list of suspects with wasted character actors, Drowning Mona is a twee farce that will prompt audiences to tune out before the mystery is solved." Metacritic, which uses a weighted average, assigned the film a score of 25 out of 100, based on 32 critics, indicating "generally unfavorable" reviews.

=== Verplanck Residents ===
The film generated controversy among residents of Verplanck due to its insulting depiction of the town. In response, screenwriter Peter Steinfeld stated that he did not mean to insult anyone and the town was chosen purely because of its history with the Yugo.

== Awards and nominations ==
=== Nominations ===
- ALMA Awards: Outstanding Director of a Feature Film (Nick Gomez)
