= American Dreamer (2022 film) =

Film by Paul Dektor

- Theatrical release poster
- Directed by: Paul Dektor
- Screenplay by: Theodore Melfi
- Story by: Theodore Melfi; Chris Wehner
- Based on: A segment from This American Life
- Produced by: Theodore Melfi; Kim Quinn; Peter Dinklage; David Ginsberg; Toyo Shimano; Paul Dektor
- Starring: Peter Dinklage; Shirley MacLaine; Kim Quinn; Danny Pudi; Danny Glover; Matt Dillon
- Cinematography: Nicolas Bolduc
- Edited by: Lisa Jane Robison
- Music by: Jeff Russo
- Production companies: Flying Firebird; Goldenlight Films; Estuary Films; Noble600
- Distributed by: Vertical
- Release dates: June 11, 2022 (Tribeca); March 8, 2024 (United States)
- Running time: 106 minutes
- Country: United States
- Language: English

American Dreamer is a 2022 American black comedy film directed by Paul Dektor and written by Theodore Melfi. Based on a segment from the radio show This American Life, it stars Peter Dinklage as a professor who tries to buy the estate of a lonely widow played by Shirley MacLaine. Kim Quinn, Danny Pudi, Danny Glover, and Matt Dillon also star.

The film premiered at the Tribeca Film Festival on June 11, 2022. It was released in the United States on March 8, 2024.

== Plot ==
Dr. Phil Loder, a low-level, adjunct professor of economics, has always dreamed of owning a home. His braggadocious real estate broker Dell advises him to seek smaller property, but Phil sees an advertisement he cannot resist: lonely widow Astrid, offers to sell her gorgeous $5 million dollar home for $240,000 cash provided that she be allowed to live the rest of her days there, while the buyer lives in the much humbler upper level, inheriting the home upon her death. Phil liquidates all his belongings and cashes out his savings to buy into the agreement. He finds Astrid prickly, and is later alarmed when she introduces a Greek plumber, Boris, and a brokerage lawyer, Maggie, as two of her kids. Phil becomes concerned that despite sinking all he owns into the agreement, Astrid's children will contest the will. Indeed, upon learning of Phil and Astrid's agreement, Maggie threatens to have him evicted and the agreement dissolved.

Phil hires a legally blind private investigator, Jerry, to dig up information on Maggie. Maggie and Phil inexplicably grow closer. Astrid slips and falls, falling into a coma before being discovered by Phil. Though Astrid eventually recovers, viewing Phil as her savior and breaking the ice between them, Phil's misanthropy alienates Maggie, who resolves to remove him from the home. Worse still, a brief affair with one of his graduate students, Clare, and an unhinged mental break from the stress of his precarious financial situation during one of his lectures results in Phil being suspended by the dean, Craig.

Maggie, consulting with Astrid's other kids, offers Phil a partial refund of his money —$50,000— to leave, which he reluctantly accepts, though Phil is concerned about Astrid's future care. As he prepares to move his things, Astrid experiences several additional accidents, and Phil rescues her each time, growing the bond between them. However, Astrid experiences a final medical emergency and dies, despite Phil's attempts to save her. Phil is stricken, and prepares to leave the house, telling Maggie he plans to sign the vacating agreement. However, upon attending Astrid's memorial and learning that Astrid's "kids" are the children in need who she cared for through her summer camp, he opts not to sign the agreement and is granted ownership of the house. Seeing that the home, which still serves as the grounds of the summer camp, is a place special to many people, he refuses to sell it and opts to maintain it. Meanwhile, Jerry returns with photos he had taken, but surprises Phil when they turn out to be photos he had taken while mistakenly tailing Clare, thinking she was Maggie. The photos reveal an affair between Clare and Craig, providing Phil the leverage he needs to be released from suspension.

== Cast ==
- Peter Dinklage as Dr. Phil Loder
- Shirley MacLaine as Astrid, the widow
- Kim Quinn as Maggie
- Danny Pudi as Craig, the Dean of Economics at Brockton University
- Matt Dillon as Dell, a real estate agent
- Danny Glover as Jerry, a private investigator
- Michelle Mylett as Clare, a graduate student
- Peter Kelamis as Burt, an officer
- Rebecca Olson as Beatrice / Babette
- Garry Chalk as Nicolai
- Peter New as Dr. Turpin

== Production ==
The independent film American Dreamer was first announced on February 2, 2021, with Peter Dinklage, Shirley MacLaine, and Kimberly Quinn attached to star. In March, Danny Glover, Matt Dillon, Danny Pudi, and Michelle Mylett joined the cast; production began on March 15 in Vancouver, and was set to conclude on April 16, 2021. Filming also took place in Victoria, British Columbia, where partial parts of the British Columbia Parliament Buildings were converted into "Brockton University" as the film is set in Massachusetts.

== Release ==
American Dreamer had a world premiere at the Tribeca Film Festival on June 11, 2022. It was released in the United States by Vertical Entertainment on March 8, 2024.

== Reception ==
On the review aggregator website Rotten Tomatoes, 50% of 34 critics' reviews are positive, with an average rating of 5.5/10. Metacritic, which uses a weighted average, assigned the film a score of 60 out of 100, based on 6 critics, indicating "mixed or average" reviews.

Carla Renata of RogerEbert.com gave the film three out of four stars and wrote, "Emmy winner Peter Dinklage is a perfect thespian match for the legendary Shirley MacLaine when it comes to curmudgeon-laced dialogue, while simultaneously giving these characters so much heart and grit that audiences will be inspired to reach into the screen to give them a hug. They're a wonderful duo, and it's their contributions and chemistry that anchor the film."
