= Get Shorty (TV series) =

American comedy-drama television series

- Genre: Comedy drama
- Created by: Davey Holmes
- Based on: Get Shorty by Elmore Leonard
- Starring: Chris O'Dowd; Ray Romano; Sean Bridgers; Carolyn Dodd; Lidia Porto; Goya Robles; Megan Stevenson; Lucy Walters; Sarah Stiles
- Composer: Antonio Sanchez
- Country of origin: United States
- Original language: English
- No. of seasons: 3
- No. of episodes: 27

Production
- Executive producers: Davey Holmes; Adam Arkin; Etan Frankel; Allen Coulter (pilot)
- Producers: Sara E. White; Laura Jacqmin; Hiram Martinez
- Cinematography: David Franco; M. David Mullen; Attila Szalay
- Camera setup: Single-camera
- Running time: 48–64 minutes
- Production companies: Holmes Quality Yarns; MGM Television

Original release
- Network: Epix
- Release: August 13, 2017 – November 17, 2019

Get Shorty is an American comedy-drama television series, based on the 1990 novel by Elmore Leonard, and serves as the third installment overall in its titular franchise. Created by Davey Holmes, it premiered on August 13, 2017, on Epix. It stars Chris O'Dowd, Ray Romano, Sean Bridgers, Carolyn Dodd, Lidia Porto, Goya Robles, Megan Stevenson, Lucy Walters, and Sarah Stiles. In December 2018, it was renewed for a third season, which began airing on October 6, 2019. A total of twenty-seven episodes were aired. Although no further seasons have been commissioned, MGM+ has not officially cancelled the show.

The series does not use the plot or any characters from the novel. The series borrows only the novel's basic premise of a gangster who attempts to produce a film and a low-budget movie director indebted to organized crime, as well as Leonard's darkly comedic tone. For that reason, the series has been described as more of an "homage" than an adaptation. The novel was previously adapted for the 1995 film.

== Premise ==
Get Shorty follows Miles Daly, who works as muscle for a murderous crime ring in Nevada. For the sake of his daughter, he attempts to change professions and become a movie producer, laundering money through a Hollywood film. But instead of leaving the criminal world behind, he accidentally brings it with him to Los Angeles. Daly ends up working with Rick Moreweather, a washed-up producer of low-quality films who becomes Miles's partner and guide through the maze of Hollywood.

== Cast and characters ==
=== Main ===
- Chris O'Dowd as Miles Daly, an enforcer for Amara De Escalones, a casino owner and gang boss in Pahrump, Nevada. Daly seeks to escape his criminal life and enter into the film industry
- Ray Romano as Rick Moreweather, a film producer
- Sean Bridgers as Louis Darnell, Miles's partner
- Carolyn Dodd as Emma Daly, Miles's and Katie's daughter. Miles's pet name for her is 'Shorty'
- Lidia Porto as Amara De Escalones
- Goya Robles as Yago, Amara's hot-headed nephew and lieutenant in her organization.
- Megan Stevenson as April Quinn
- Lucy Walters as Katie Daly, Miles' wife (S1), later ex-wife (S2)
- Sarah Stiles as Gladys Parrish (seasons 2-3; recurring season 1)
- Isaac Keys as Ed

=== Recurring ===
- Sasha Feldman as Bliz
- Bryan Lugo as Ross
- Ryan Begay as Clipper
- Billy Magnussen as Nathan Hill
- Bruce McIntosh as George
- Peter Stormare as Hafdis Snaejornsson, the director of the first film Miles and Rick produced, The Admiral's Mistress.
- Kristoffer Polaha as Jeffrey
- Phil LaMarr as Brandon Fisher
- Antwon Tanner as Lyle
- Paul Adelstein as Wes Krupke
- Topher Grace as Tyler Mathis
- Andrea Rosen as Caroline
- Felicity Huffman as Clara Dillard (season 2), a mothering, high-level special agent for the FBI.
- Steven Weber as Laurence Budd (seasons 2 & 3), a powerful film producer in Hollywood. A medical condition has left him hairless, so he glues on a wig and eyebrows. He collaborates on a film with Miles and Rick.
- Andrew Leeds as Ken Stevenson (season 2), an FBI special agent and the partner of Clara Dillard.
- Amy Seimetz as Jinny (season 2), a mysterious love interest for Miles.
- Alex Sawyer as David Oumou (season 2), an actor working a day job, until a murder brings him attention and turns him into an overnight star.
- Sonya Walger as Lila (season 2 & 3), a woman who represents the L.A. wing of a deadly drug cartel.
- Raymond Cruz as Swayze (season 2), the leader of a Latino prison gang.
- Heather Graham as Hannah (seasons 2 & 3), a woman who runs a banana stand and has a flirtation with Rick.
- Seychelle Gabriel as Giulia (season 3)
- Michaela Watkins as Ali Egan (season 3)
- Shannon Chan-Kent

=== Guest ===
- Alan Arkin as Eugene ("The Yips")
- Jim Piddock as Julian Pynter ("A Man of Letters")
- Dean Norris as Bob Grace ("Grace Under Pressure")
- Peter Bogdanovich as Giustino Moreweather, Rick's elderly father. ("Turnaround", "Selenite")
- Merrick McCartha as Detective Torann ("And What Have We Learned?")

== Episodes ==
Season	Episodes	Originally released	
Season	Episodes	First released	Last released
1	10	August 13, 2017	October 8, 2017
2	10	August 12, 2018	October 7, 2018
3	7	October 6, 2019	November 17, 2019

=== Season 1 (2017) ===
No. overall	No. in season	Title	Directed by	Written by	Original release date
1	1	"The Pitch"	Allen Coulter	Davey Holmes	August 13, 2017
2	2	"Sins of a Chambermaid"	Colin Bucksey	Davey Holmes	August 13, 2017
3	3	"The Yips"	Adam Arkin	Dan Nowak	August 20, 2017
4	4	"From Stamos With Love"	Daisy von Scherler Mayer	John Stuart Newman	August 27, 2017
5	5	"A Man of Letters"	Ed Bianchi	Davey Holmes & Laura Jacqmin	September 3, 2017
6	6	"Epinephrine"	Ed Bianchi	Jennifer Hoppe & Nancy Fichman	September 10, 2017
7	7	"Grace Under Pressure"	Dan Attias	Davey Holmes & John Newman	September 17, 2017
8	8	"Shot on Location"	Dan Attias	Laura Jacqmin	September 24, 2017
9	9	"Turnaround"	Adam Arkin	Davey Holmes	October 1, 2017
10	10	"Blue Pages"	Adam Arkin	Davey Holmes	October 8, 2017

=== Season 2 (2018) ===
No. overall	No. in season	Title	Directed by	Written by	Original release date
11	1	"And What Have We Learned?"	Adam Arkin	Davey Holmes	August 12, 2018
12	2	"Pest Control"	Adam Arkin	Etan Frankel	August 12, 2018
13	3	"Selenite"	Daisy von Scherler Mayer	Laura Jacqmin	August 19, 2018
14	4	"We'll Let You Know"	Daisy von Scherler Mayer	Hiram Martinez	August 26, 2018
15	5	"Fifteen to Thirty Minutes (Depending on Weight)"	Adam Arkin	Davey Holmes & Alex Carmedelle	September 2, 2018
16	6	"Unlimited (Limited)"	Adam Arkin	Laura Jacqmin	September 9, 2018
17	7	"Banana Split"	So Yong Kim	Hiram Martinez	September 16, 2018
18	8	"Curtains"	So Yong Kim	Etan Frankel	September 23, 2018
19	9	"Safe Space"	Adam Arkin	Laura Jacqmin & Alex Carmedelle	September 30, 2018
20	10	"Pickle"	Adam Arkin	Davey Holmes	October 7, 2018

=== Season 3 (2019) ===
No. overall	No. in season	Title	Directed by	Written by	Original release date
21	1	"What To Do When You Land"	Adam Arkin	Davey Holmes	October 6, 2019
22	2	"Dark Roast, Oat Milk, Two Splendas"	Adam Arkin	Laura Jacqmin	October 13, 2019
23	3	"Strong Move"	Eric Galileo Tignini	Hiram Martinez	October 20, 2019
24	4	"What Else Did God Say?"	Davey Holmes	Alex Carmedelle	October 27, 2019
25	5	"The Stick"	Davey Holmes	Davey Holmes	November 3, 2019
26	6	"Tomorrow They Light Me On Fire"	Adam Arkin	Laura Jacqmin & Hiram Martinez	November 10, 2019
27	7	"Should Not Throw Stones"	Adam Arkin	Davey Holmes & Alex Carmedelle	November 17, 2019

== Production ==
=== Development ===
A first season order of ten episodes was announced by Epix on May 24, 2016. Davey Holmes was hired to write the series, and Epix president and CEO Mark S. Greenberg said of him, "Davey Holmes is a tremendous talent and has created a fantastic new series that is in the spirit of Leonard's unique brand of social satire and strong narrative voice." The first season premiered on August 13, 2017.

Shortly after the first season premier, Epix announced that the series had been renewed for a second ten-episode season. In December 2018, the show renewed for a third season consisting of seven episodes.

=== Casting ===
Chris O'Dowd and Ray Romano were cast in the series' lead roles in August 2016. Sean Bridgers, Lidia Porto, Megan Stevenson, Goya Robles, Lucy Walters, and Carolyn Dodd joined the main cast by November of that year, and Sarah Stiles was cast in a recurring role. By early 2017, Antwon Tanner was cast in a recurring role.

By February 2018, Felicity Huffman, Steven Weber, and Andrew Leeds were cast in recurring roles, and Sarah Stiles had been upgraded from recurring role to a starring one. In March 2018, it was reported that Amy Seimetz, Alex Sawyer, and Sonya Walger had joined the series in a recurring capacity. In May 2018, it was announced that Raymond Cruz had been cast in a recurring role.

=== Filming ===
Principal photography for season one occurred from late-2016 through May 2017 in Albuquerque, New Mexico and Los Angeles, California. Filming for season two began in February 2018 with production for the whole season expected to take place in Los Angeles, California. Season three was filmed in Vancouver, British Columbia with additional photography taking place in Los Angeles.

== Release ==
=== Marketing ===
On May 25, 2017, a trailer for the first season was released. On July 20, 2018, a trailer for the second season was released.

=== Premiere ===
On June 10, 2018, the series held a screening of the second season premiere at the annual ATX Television Festival in Austin, Texas. Following the screening, a question-and-answer panel was held featuring creator Davey Holmes, producer/director Adam Arkin, and actors Chris O’Dowd and Lidia Porto. On September 9, 2018, the series took part in the 12th annual PaleyFest Fall Television Previews which featured a preview screening of season two and a conversation with creator and executive producer Davey Holmes and director Adam Arkin, among other guests.

== Reception ==
=== Critical response ===
The first season was met with a positive response from critics. On Rotten Tomatoes, the first season holds a 78% approval rating with an average rating of 7.35 out of 10 based on 27 reviews. The website's critical consensus reads "Get Shorty's slick production values are complemented by its seasoned cast's chemistry to create a fun-filled, if violent, first season that lives up to its source material." Metacritic, which uses a weighted average, assigned the season a score of 71 out of 100 based on 19 reviews, indicating "generally favorable reviews".

=== Awards and nominations ===
Year	Award	Category	Nominee(s)	Result	Ref.
2018	Irish Film & Television Awards	Actor in a leading role – Drama	Chris O'Dowd	Nominated	
