= Carlos Gomez (American actor) =

American actor (born 1962)

Carlos Gómez
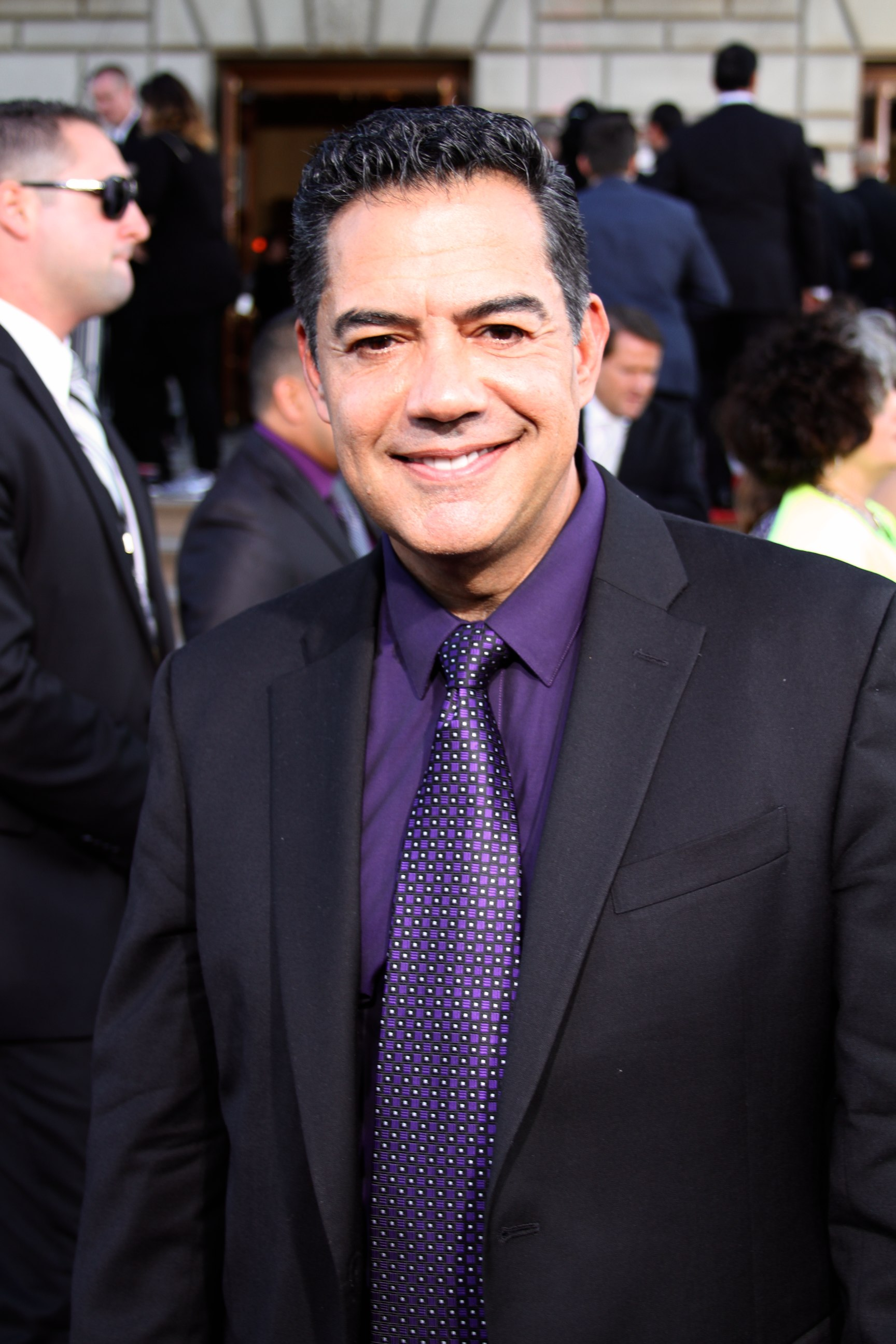
- Carlos Gómez at the 2014 Alma Awards.
- Born: Carlos Gómez II; January 1, 1962 (age 64); New York City, New York, U.S.
- Occupation: Actor
- Years active: 1981–present

Carlos Gómez (born January 1, 1962) is an American actor.

== Life and career ==
Gómez was born in New York, to Cuban American parents, the son of Cora Gomez. He is an actor who has starred in both film and on the small screen since the late 1980s. His first part in a film came in the form of a dancer looking to make it big in Dance to Win (1989). One of his more notable performances is considered to be as gay paramedic Raul Melendez in ER (1995–1996).

He has, among other roles, guest-starred as a repeating support villain on the hit television show Charmed as the San Francisco Police Department (SFPD) Internal Affairs Department Inspector (and undercover demon) Rodriguez pressuring the regular character Andy Trudeau. He first appeared in the 20th episode of the first season "The Power of Two", and his final appearance was in the 22nd episode of the season (its finale) "Deja Vu All Over Again".

He has also starred alongside Salma Hayek in two films, the first being Desperado, where he plays the Right Hand of Bucho, the man Antonio Banderas spends the film looking for, and also, in Fools Rush In, where he plays Salma's ex-boyfriend, Chuy. Carlos can also be seen in the CBS drama Shark, where he plays Mayor Manny Delgado, alongside James Woods and Jeri Ryan.

Gomez appeared in the 2008 Broadway musical In the Heights as Kevin and was a cast member of the A&E television series The Glades for all four seasons. He also played the part of Officer Navarro in the Criminal Minds episode "Machismo".

He also appeared in season 3 of the NBC sitcom Friends episode titled "The One with All the Jealousy", and in season 3 of the Fox drama 24. He appeared in Dolphin Tale 2. In 2020, Gomez was cast as Rafael Garcia, the lead character's father, in the ABC romantic comedy-drama series The Baker and the Beauty.

== Filmography ==
Film
Year	Title	Role	Notes
1989	Dance to Win	Slammer	
1990	Hard to Kill	Neighbor	
1995	Desperado	Memo "Right Hand"	
1997	Fools Rush In	Chuy	
1997	The Peacemaker	Captain Santiago	
1998	The Negotiator	Eagle	
1998	The Replacement Killers	Detective Hunt	
1998	Enemy of the State	FBI Agent	
1999	Winding Roads	Jesus	
2003	In Hell	Tolik	
2003	House of Sand and Fog	Alvarez	
2014	Dolphin Tale 2	Dr. Miguel Arroyo	
2016	Ride Along 2	Captain Hernandez	
2019	The Report	Jose Rodriguez	
2021	Rumble	Jimbo Coyle	
2021	Spiked	Mike	
2026	Ghost Soldier	Javier Hernandez	

Television
Year	Title	Role	Notes
1995–1996	ER	Raul Melendez	6 episodes
1996	New York Undercover	Orlando Maldone	Episodes: "Deep Cover" and "If This World Were Mine"
1997	Friends	Julio	Episode: "The One with All the Jealousy"
1999	Charmed	Inspector Rodriguez	3 episodes
1999; 2005	NYPD Blue	Raul Montez	Episode: "Big Bang Theory"
1999; 2005	NYPD Blue	Anthony Perez	Episode: "Lenny Scissorhands"
2003; 2022	NCIS	Chief Petty Officer Reyes	Episode: "High Seas"
2003; 2022	NCIS	Admiral Carlos Mendoza	Episode: "Foreign Bodies"
2003	24	Luis Annicon	3 episodes
2005	My Wife and Kids	Fernando Torres	Episode: "Jr.'s Cartoon"
2006	Monk	Miguel Escobar	Episode: "Mr. Monk Gets Jury Duty"
2006	Criminal Minds	Officer Navarro	Episode: "Machismo"
2006–2008	Shark	Mayor Manuel Delgado	12 episodes
2010–2013	The Glades	Dr. Carlos Sanchez	49 episodes
2014	Gang Related	Miguel Salazar	5 episodes
2015–2016	Madam Secretary	Jose Campos	11 episodes
2017	Law & Order True Crime: The Menendez Murders	José Menendez	6 episodes
2017–2018	NCIS: New Orleans	NCIS Deputy Director; Dan Sanchez	3 episodes
2019	The Blacklist	Francisco "El Conejo" Marquez	Episode: "El Conejo"
2019	Elementary	Enrique Ruiz	Episode: "On the Scent"
2019	Chicago Med	James Young	Episode: "Death Do Us Part"
2019	Instinct	Alfaro	Episode: "Finders Keepers"
2020	The Baker and the Beauty	Rafael Garcia	9 episodes
2021	Big Sky	Gil Amaya	3 episodes
2023	Not Dead Yet	Luis Serrano	Episodes: "Not Out of the Game Yet"
