= Katrina Holden Bronson =

American actress

- Born: Katrina Holden; 1966 or 1967 (age 59–60)
- Citizenship: United States
- Occupations: Actress, director, screenwriter
- Years active: 1977–2005

Katrina Holden Bronson (née Holden; 1966 or 1967) is an American former actress, screenwriter and director.

She is the daughter of the late Hilary Holden, an English casting director/single mother and longtime friend of actress Jill Ireland, and the adopted daughter of Ireland and actor Charles Bronson.

Bronson wrote and directed the 2005 comedy-drama film Daltry Calhoun.

== Filmography ==
Acting

- The Uncanny (1977) as Lucy
- Death Wish 4: The Crackdown (1987) as Nurse
- Last Exit to Earth (1996) as Woman #1
- Defying Gravity (1997) as Rachel
- Winding Roads (1999) as Samantha Stafford
- Bleach (2002) as Laura
- Spanish Fly (2003) as Anda

Other

- Daltry Calhoun (2005) as writer and director
