= Chris O'Dowd =

Irish actor and comedian (born 1979)

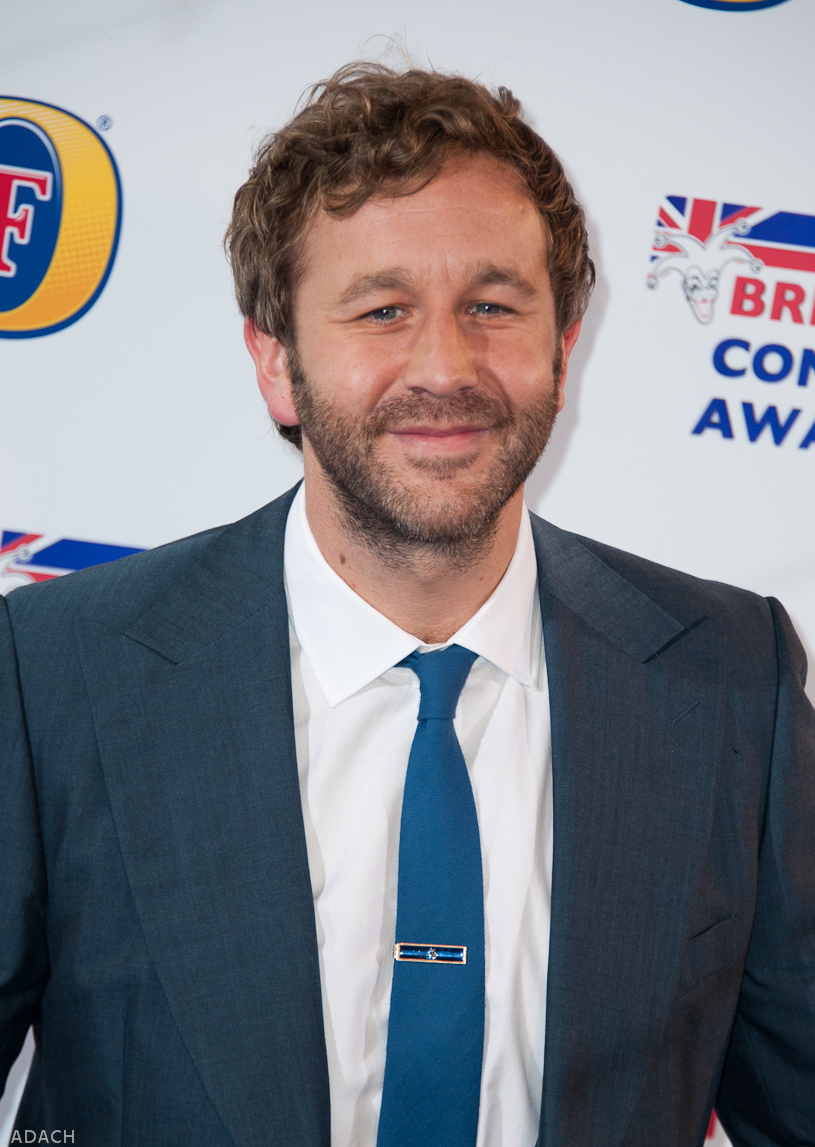
- O'Dowd at the British Comedy Awards in 2013
- Born: Christopher O'Dowd; 9 October 1979 (age 47); Boyle, County Roscommon, Ireland
- Education: University College Dublin (no degree); London Academy of Music and Dramatic Art (no degree)
- Occupations: Actor; comedian
- Years active: 2003–present
- Spouse: Dawn O'Porter (m. 2012)
- Children: 2

Signature
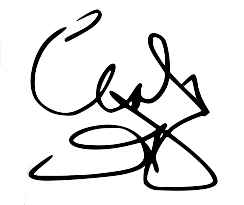

Christopher O'Dowd (born 9 October 1979) is an Irish actor and comedian. He received wide attention as Roy Trenneman, one of the lead characters in the Channel 4 comedy The IT Crowd, which ran for four series from 2006 to 2010. He has starred in films including Frequently Asked Questions About Time Travel (2009), Gulliver's Travels (2010), Bridesmaids, Friends with Kids (both 2011), The Sapphires (2012) for which he won an AACTA Award, Cuban Fury (2014), Miss Peregrine's Home for Peculiar Children (2016) and The Cloverfield Paradox (2018). He created and starred in the Sky 1 television series Moone Boy, which aired from 2012 to 2015 and brought him Irish Film and Television Award nominations for acting, writing and directing.

Since 2017, he has appeared as Miles Daly in the Epix comedy series Get Shorty. He had a recurring role on the comedy-drama series Girls. His performance in the British comedy TV series State of the Union won him a Primetime Emmy Award. He made his Broadway debut in the play adaptation of Of Mice and Men in 2014, for which he was nominated for a Tony Award. In 2020, he was listed as #39 on The Irish Times list of Ireland's greatest film actors.

== Early life and education ==
O'Dowd was born and raised in Boyle, in County Roscommon. His father, Seán, is a sign designer, and his mother, Denise, a counsellor and psychotherapist. He is the youngest of five siblings.

He represented Roscommon in Gaelic football at under-16, minor and under-21 levels, the highlight being his performance as a goalkeeper in the 1997 Connacht Minor Football Championship final against Mayo, a game which RTÉ Sport covered and aired as part of its The Sunday Game highlights programme.

He studied politics and sociology at University College Dublin (UCD), and subsequently attended the London Academy of Music and Dramatic Art (leaving before graduating after 18 months). He told the UCD student newspaper the College Tribune: "I didn't finish my degree. The politics part of it was fine, but I was doing sociology as well and I could never bring myself to find an interest in it." He contributed to The University Observer and was active in the UCD Drama Society and the Literary and Historical Society.

== Career ==
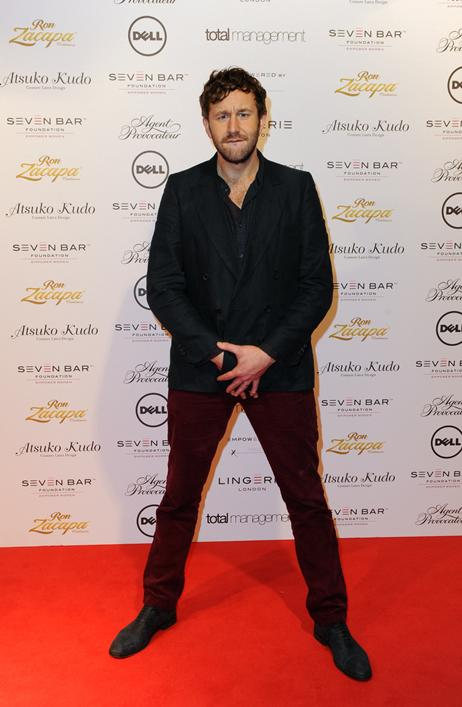
O'Dowd at Lingerie London in 2012

O'Dowd starred in the UK in Channel 4's comedy The IT Crowd, BBC Two's Roman's Empire, Red Cap, and the award-winning documentary-drama The Year London Blew Up. He has also appeared on Irish television, having starred in the RTÉ One drama The Clinic and the drama Showbands alongside Kerry Katona.

He has appeared in How to Lose Friends & Alienate People in a minor role. He has also had roles in a number of films, including the 2005 film Festival where he played stand-up comedian Tommy O'Dwyer, a role for which he won a Scottish BAFTA award, and a small role in Vera Drake. He appears in Frequently Asked Questions About Time Travel, a comedy sci-fiction film with Marc Wootton, Dean Lennox Kelly, and Anna Faris. He played Liam in the 2007 German film Hotel Very Welcome.

He starred in the 2009 film The Boat That Rocked, inspired by the story of offshore pirate broadcasters Radio Caroline, which was released in Canada and the U.S. as Pirate Radio. O'Dowd plays Simon, the station's breakfast DJ. "The breakfast jock on Radio Caroline at the time was Tony Blackburn, so there's definitely an element of him in it," O'Dowd says of his character. "And then I called in different Irish DJs that would have been contemporaries of Tony Blackburn at the time, a guy called Larry Gogan and a couple of other people."

O'Dowd starred opposite Sienna Miller in the film Hippie Hippie Shake, about the groundbreaking '60s magazine Oz, the precursor to a whole generation of lad mags. O'Dowd plays Felix Dennis, who later became the publisher of Maxim, and his landmark indecency trial. In preparation for the role, O'Dowd met with Dennis, and said, "He was an incredibly charismatic man."

In April 2009, it was announced that O'Dowd was cast in a remake of Gulliver's Travels as General Edward Edwardian. "It's shooting in Pinewood from the end of April", he said, shortly after his participation was announced. "I'm just going back to England to learn how to ride a horse... I'm a general in the army, so there's going to be a little bit of horse riding. I think it's going to be really fun though, we're all kind of learning together."

O'Dowd appeared in the 2010 film Dinner for Schmucks, an American version of the French farce Le Dîner de Cons. He also appeared on panel show Never Mind the Buzzcocks (season 21, episode 11), and starred in an ITV2 comedy series entitled FM. In 2010, he took part in Little Crackers, writing and directing a short film loosely based on his own childhood and Christmas in his family home from 1984 to 1988. In April 2011, he starred in the BBC adaptation of The Crimson Petal and the White as William Rackham, and in the May 2011 release Bridesmaids as Officer Nathan Rhodes.

O'Dowd had a supporting role in This Is 40. He described "fighting over Megan Fox in a pool" during filming as "one of the most fun things I've ever done".

He played Dave in Wayne Blair's 2012 debut feature Australian musical The Sapphires. Based on a popular stage show, it was shot across Australia and Vietnam and produced by Goalpost Australia. He is to write and executive produce a new American comedy series called Big Men, after NBC won the bidding war for it.

He co-wrote Moone Boy, a series based on his childhood, for Sky 1. It was filmed in his hometown of Boyle. Segments of it ran from 2012 to 2015. O'Dowd has also co-written some books based on the series: Moone Boy: The Blunder Years (published May 2015), Moone Boy: The Fish Detective (October 2015), Moone Boy: The Notion Potion (September 2017), and an activity book, Moone Boy: The Marvellous Activity Manual (May 2017).

From April to July 2014, O'Dowd starred in the Broadway revival of Of Mice and Men, directed by Anna D. Shapiro and co-starring James Franco and Leighton Meester, for which O'Dowd was nominated for a Drama Desk and Tony Award for Best Actor in a Play. He starred as a Catholic school teacher in the 2014 film St. Vincent with Bill Murray and Melissa McCarthy. He was also the narrator for the 2014 RTÉ documentary Man on Bridge.

From 2017 to 2019, O'Dowd played the lead role in three seasons of the MGM+ television show Get Shorty, created by Davey Holmes and co-starring Ray Romano, for which O'Dowd received a nomination for Best Actor in a Leading Role from the 2018 IFTA Film & Drama Awards.

In 2022, O'Dowd played Philip in the Netflix film Slumberland alongside Jason Momoa, Kyle Chandler and young actress Marlow Barkley.

O’Dowd created and starred in the television series Small Town, Big Story, which premiered 27 February 2025 on Sky.

In 2026 he voiced the character of Mopple, a Merino sheep, in The Sheep Detectives.

== Personal life ==
O'Dowd married Scottish writer, director and television presenter Dawn Porter in 2012. After their wedding, Dawn changed her surname to O'Porter. In February 2015, it was announced on Twitter that O'Porter had given birth to their son. In July 2017, O'Porter gave birth to their second son. In 2024, the family relocated back to the UK, following a decade long stay in Los Angeles, they currently divide their time between homes in Bermondsey in London, and Margate in Kent.

O'Dowd says he has developed an antitheist philosophy, and believes religion is "going to be like racism" in terms of social unacceptability and condemnation.

In April 2014, he presented at the Broadway Cares/Equity Fights AIDS Easter Bonnet Competition with Leighton Meester and James Franco, after raising donations for their Broadway show Of Mice and Men.

== Performances and works ==
=== Film ===
Year	Title	Role	Notes
2003	Conspiracy of Silence	James Matthews	
2004	Vera Drake	Sid's Customer	
2005	Festival	Tommy O'Dwyer	BAFTA Scotland Award for Best Actor in a Scottish Film
2007	Hotel Very Welcome	Liam	
2008	How to Lose Friends & Alienate People	Post Modern Review staff	
2009	The Boat That Rocked	"Simple" Simon Swafford	AKA Pirate Radio
2009	Frequently Asked Questions About Time Travel	Ray	
2010	Hippie Hippie Shake	Felix Dennis	
2010	Dinner for Schmucks	Marco	
2010	Gulliver's Travels	General Edward Edwardian	
2011	Bridesmaids	Wisconsin State Patrol Officer Nathan Rhodes	IFTA Award for Best Supporting Actor; Nominated—Actor Award for Outstanding Performance by a Cast in a Motion Picture; Nominated—Broadcast Film Critics Association Award for Best Acting Ensemble; Nominated—Phoenix Award for Best Ensemble Acting
2011	Friends with Kids	Alex	
2012	3,2,1... Frankie Go Boom	Bruce	
2012	The Sapphires	Dave	AACTA Award for Best Actor in a Leading Role
2012	This Is 40	Ronnie	
2013	Epic	Grub (voice)	
2013	The Double	Nurse	Cameo
2013	Thor: The Dark World	Richard	
2014	Calvary	Jack Brennan	
2014	Cuban Fury	Drew	
2014	St. Vincent	Brother Geraghty	
2015	The Program	David Walsh	
2016	Mascots	Tommy 'Zook' Zucarello	
2016	Miss Peregrine's Home for Peculiar Children	Franklin Portman	
2017	The Incredible Jessica James	Boone	
2017	Love After Love	Nicholas	
2017	Loving Vincent	Postman Roulin	Voice and reference footage for animation
2017	Molly's Game	Douglas Downey	
2018	Juliet, Naked	Duncan Thomson	
2018	The Cloverfield Paradox	Mundy	
2018	Mary Poppins Returns	Shamus the Coachman Dog (voice)	
2019	How to Build a Girl	Alan Wilko Wilkinson	
2021	The Starling	Jack Maynard	
2022	My Father's Dragon	Kwan the Macaque (voice)	
2022	Slumberland	Philip	
2026	The Sheep Detectives	Mopple (Voice)	
2026	Artificial		Post-production

=== Television ===
Year	Title	Role	Notes
2003	Red Cap	Bernie Maddox	Episode: "Crush"
2003–2005	The Clinic	Brendan Davenport	18 episodes Nominated—IFTA Award for Best Supporting Actor in Television (2005)
2005	The Year London Blew Up: 1974	Dowd	Television film
2006	Showbands II	Mervin Mooney	Television film Nominated—IFTA Award for Best Supporting Actor in Television (2007)
2006	8 Out of 10 Cats	Himself	
2006	The Amazing Mrs Pritchard	Headmaster	2 episodes
2006	Doc Martin	Jonathan Crozier	Episode: "On the Edge"
2006–2010, 2013	The IT Crowd	Roy Trenneman	25 episodes
2007	Roman's Empire	Jase	5 episodes
2009	FM	Lindsay	6 episodes
2010	Little Crackers	Himself / Santa Claus	Episode: "Chris O'Dowd's Little Cracker: Capturing Santa"; also writer
2011	The Crimson Petal and the White	William Rackham	4 episodes Nominated—IFTA Award for Best Actor in Television (2012)
2011–2012	Family Guy	Butler, Contestant, Guard (voices)	2 episodes
2012–2013	Girls	Thomas John	5 episodes
2012–2015	Moone Boy	Sean Murphy	18 episodes; also creator, writer, director and executive producer International Emmy Award for Best Comedy Series (2013); IFTA Award for Best Entertainment Programme (2013–2014); Nominated—Broadcasting Press Guild Award for Best Multichannel Programme (2013); Nominated—IFTA Award for Best Script Drama; Nominated—IFTA Award for Best Supporting Actor in Television (2013); Nominated—IFTA Award for Best Actor in Television (2014)
2013	Family Tree	Tom Chadwick	8 episodes
2013–2014	Monsters vs. Aliens	Dr. Herbert Cockroach (voice)	26 episodes
2015–2016, 2025-present	Puffin Rock	Narrator (voice)	main role
2016	Travel Man	Himself	Episode: "48 Hours in Vienna"
2017–2019	Get Shorty	Miles Daly	27 episodes
2019	State of the Union	Tom	10 episodes Primetime Emmy Award for Outstanding Actor in a Short Form Comedy or Drama Series
2019	The Twilight Zone	Jeff Storck	Episode: "The Blue Scorpion"
2021	The Simpsons	Seamus (voice)	Episode: "A Serious Flanders"
2022–2023	Human Resources	Flanny O'Lympic (voice)	3 episodes
2022–2023	Big Mouth	Flanny O'Lympic (voice)	6 episodes
2023–2024	The Big Door Prize	Dusty	20 episodes
2025	Small Town, Big Story	Jack E McCarthy	2 episodes; also creator, writer, producer, director
2025	Black Mirror	Mike Waters	Episode: "Common People"
2026	A Course Called Ireland	Himself	Episode 2: "The High Notes", Episode 3: "The Devil Is In Him"

=== Theatre ===
Year	Title	Role	Notes
2008	Under the Blue Sky	Nick	Duke of York's Theatre
2014	Of Mice and Men	Lennie Small	Longacre Theatre; Nominated—Tony Award for Best Actor in a Play; Nominated—Drama Desk Award for Outstanding Actor in a Play
2021	Constellations	Roland	Vaudeville Theatre
2025	The Brightening Air	Dermot	The Old Vic

=== Books ===
- Moone Boy: The Blunder Years, Chris O'Dowd and Nick V. Murphy (2014)
- Moone Boy: The Fish Detective, Chris O'Dowd and Nick V. Murphy (2015)
- Moone Boy: The Notion Potion, Chris O'Dowd and Nick V. Murphy (2017)
