= Theodore Melfi =

American film director and producer

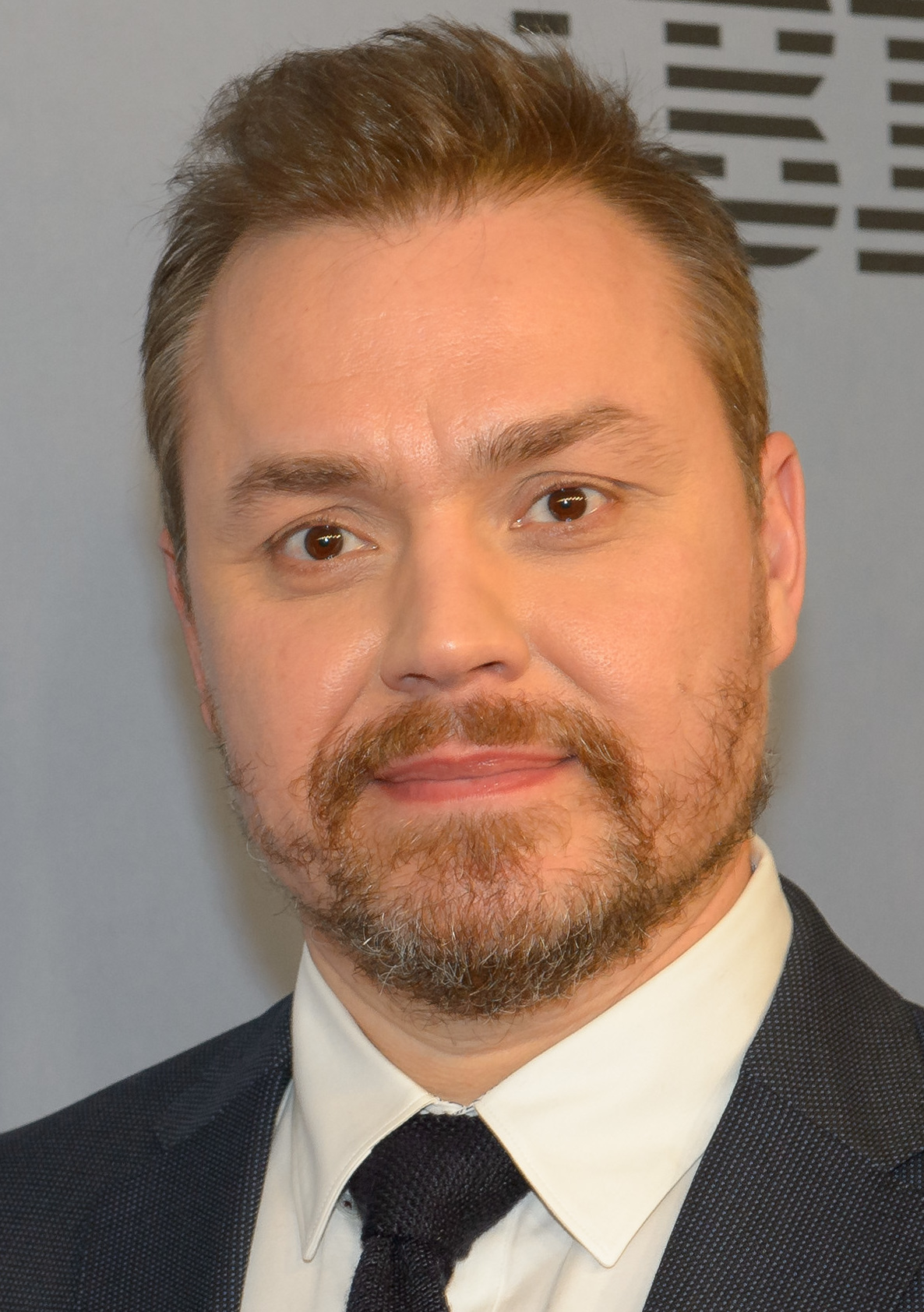
- Melfi in 2016
- Born: New York City, New York, United States
- Occupation(s): Screenwriter, film director, film producer
- Years active: 1998–present
- Spouse: Kimberly Quinn

Theodore Melfi is an American filmmaker. In 2016, Melfi co-wrote, directed, and co-produced Hidden Figures, for which he received Oscar nominations for Best Picture and Best Adapted Screenplay. He is of Italian descent.

== Filmography ==
Year	Film	Credited as			
Year	Film	Director	Writer	Producer	Notes
1999	Winding Roads	Yes	Yes	Yes	Co-written with Kimberly Quinn Co-produced with Bryan Godwin
2007	Game of Life	No	No	Yes	
2010	Bed & Breakfast: Love is a Happy Accident	No	No	Yes	
2014	St. Vincent	Yes	Yes	Yes	
2016	Hidden Figures	Yes	Yes	Yes	Co-written with Allison Schroeder Nominated–Academy Award for Best Picture; Nominated–Academy Award for Best Adapted Screenplay
2017	Going in Style	No	Yes	Yes	
2017	The Black Ghiandola	No	Yes	Yes	Short film Co-directed with Sam Raimi and Catherine Hardwicke
2017	El Camino Christmas	No	Yes	Yes	Co-written with Christopher Wehner Co-produced with Kimberly Quinn
2020	Daughter	Yes	Yes	No	Short film
2021	The Starling	Yes	No	Yes	Co-produced with Kimberly Quinn and Dylan Sellers
2022	American Dreamer	No	Yes	Yes	Co-produced with Peter Dinklage, David Ginsburg, Kimberly Quinn, and Paul Dektor
2022	Ticket to Paradise	No	uncredited	No	Additional literary material
