= Davey Holmes =

American dramatist, screenwriter (born 1969)

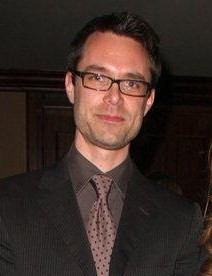
- Holmes at the 2009 Writers Guild Award Ceremony
- Born: October 4, 1969 (age 56); Massachusetts, US
- Occupations: Screenwriter, producer, director
- Spouse: Sonya Walger (m. 2009)
- Children: 2
- Writing career
- Notable works: Get Shorty (2017–2020); Shameless (2013–2015); Pushing Daisies (2009); In Treatment (2008); Damages (2007)

Davey Holmes (born October 4, 1969) is an American screenwriter, producer and director. He is the creator and executive producer of the television show Get Shorty (2017–2019) on Epix.

== Career ==
Holmes began his writing career in New York City with a production of his original play More Lies About Jerzy (2001) at the Vineyard Theatre starring Jared Harris, and later productions of the play in London at the New End Theatre and in Los Angeles at the Hayworth Theatre.

Holmes works extensively in television. He was executive producer of the Showtime series Shameless. Other series he has written for include: In Treatment, for which he won the Writers Guild of America Award for Best Screenplay - New Series in 2009; Damages, for which he received a nomination for Writers Guild of America Award for Best Screenplay - New Series in 2008;Pushing Daisies; Awake; Chicago Code; 3 lbs; and Law & Order.

In 2016, Holmes created the Epix television series Get Shorty (2017–2019), inspired by the eponymous novel by Elmore Leonard; he also directed episodes of the series.

In 2017, his Holmes Quality Yarns production company struck an overall long-term deal with MGM Television.

== Personal life ==
Holmes married actress Sonya Walger in July 2009, residing in Los Angeles, California at that time.

Holmes played keyboards with the ska punk band, The Mighty Mighty Bosstones, including on their 1989 album Devil's Night Out.
