= Be Cool =

2005 film by F. Gary Gray

- Theatrical release poster
- Directed by: F. Gary Gray
- Screenplay by: Peter Steinfeld
- Based on: Be Cool by Elmore Leonard
- Produced by: Danny DeVito; Michael Shamberg; Stacey Sher
- Starring: John Travolta; Uma Thurman; Vince Vaughn; Cedric the Entertainer; Andre Benjamin; Steven Tyler; Robert Pastorelli; Christina Milian; Harvey Keitel; The Rock; Danny DeVito
- Cinematography: Jeffrey L. Kimball
- Edited by: Sheldon Kahn
- Music by: John Powell
- Production companies: Metro-Goldwyn-Mayer Pictures; Jersey Films; Double Feature Films
- Distributed by: MGM Distribution Co. (United States); 20th Century Fox (International)
- Release date: March 4, 2005
- Running time: 120 minutes
- Country: United States
- Language: English
- Budget: $53–75 million
- Box office: $95.8 million

Be Cool is a 2005 American crime comedy film directed by F. Gary Gray and based on Elmore Leonard's 1999 novel, which was the sequel to Leonard's 1990 novel Get Shorty. The movie is the sequel to the 1995 film adaptation of Get Shorty, with John Travolta and Danny DeVito reprising their roles and also starring Uma Thurman, Vince Vaughn, Cedric the Entertainer, Andre Benjamin, Steven Tyler, Robert Pastorelli, Christina Milian, Harvey Keitel and The Rock. In addition to being Pastorelli's final appearance, it was also Anna Nicole Smith's last feature film before her death in 2007. The plot follows mobster Chili Palmer, portrayed by Travolta, as he enters the music industry.

The film adaptation of Be Cool began production in 2004 and was produced by DeVito, Michael Shamberg and Stacey Sher. The film was released on March 4, 2005 by MGM Distribution Co., with 20th Century Fox releasing in other territories, to negative reviews, but grossed $95.8 million against a budget of $53–75 million.

== Plot ==
Ernesto "Chili" Palmer, restless and disenchanted with filmmaking, enters the music industry after witnessing the Russian mob publicly kill his friend Tommy Athens, owner of a small independent record label. Chili offers to help Tommy's widow Edie Athens manage the failing business, which owes $300,000 to hip-hop producer Sin LaSalle.

Chili is impressed by small-time club singer Linda Moon and helps free her from contractual obligations to crooked producers Nick Carr and Raji, who has a gay Samoan bodyguard named Elliot, an aspiring actor and the butt of Carr and Raji's gay jokes. Carr and Raji pay hitman Joe "Loop" Lupino to kill Chili before he can save Edie's company by arranging for Linda to perform with Steven Tyler and Aerosmith.

LaSalle demands payment of the $300,000 but agrees to give Chili a few days to get the money plus the vig. When the Russians attempt to kill Chili, Loop mistakenly kills mob enforcer Ivan Argianiyev. Carr is furious about the mistake and orders Raji to talk to Loop. Raji then beats Loop to death with a metal baseball bat after Loop "disrespects" him.

Carr tries to trick Chili by handing him a pawn ticket, claiming that the only copy of Linda's contract is at a pawn shop owned by the Russians. Chili, smarter than Carr anticipated, has Edie tip off the FBI and starts a fight to get the shop raided. Raji and Elliot set up LaSalle by making him believe that Carr tricked Chili into giving him the $300,000 to get Linda's contract. LaSalle and his bodyguards, rap group DubMD, confront Carr in his office, as does the Russian boss, Bulkin, and his men. Insulted by Bulkin's racist remarks, LaSalle murders him.

Chili squeezes in a dance with Edie, celebrating as Linda makes her appearance and becomes an instant success. He also placates LaSalle, who will produce Linda's next album and get a share of the profits.

Carr is enraged upon hearing of the deal, so he and Raji order Elliot to kill Chili. By assuring Elliot that he can help his acting career, Chili befriends him. Learning that Chili had gotten him an audition for a Nicole Kidman film, Elliot turns on Raji, who had erased the message on his answering machine. Raji is burned to death on camera by a fireworks explosion. Carr is arrested for murder when Chili makes sure he is caught with the bat used to kill Loop.

At the MTV Video Music Awards, Linda wins the awards for Best New Artist and Video of the Year. During her acceptance speech, she thanks Edie, Sin, and Chili. Edie and Chili leave the award ceremony. As Chili drives off, he passes a billboard revealing that Elliot is the co-star of a new movie with Kidman.

== Cast ==
- John Travolta as Chili Palmer
- Uma Thurman as Edie Athens
- Vince Vaughn as Roger "Raji" Lowenthal
- Cedric the Entertainer as Sin LaSalle
- André Benjamin as Dabu
- Robert Pastorelli as Joseph "Joe Loop" Lupino
- Christina Milian as Linda Moon
- Paul Adelstein as Hyman Gordon
- Debi Mazar as Marla
- GregAlan Williams as Darryl
- Harvey Keitel as Nick Carr
- The Rock as Elliot Wilhelm
- Danny DeVito as Martin Weir
- Seth Green as Shotgun
- James Woods as Tommy Athens
- Alex Kubik as Roman Bulkin
- George Fisher as Ivan Argianiyev
- Serdar Kalsin as Semyon
- Anthony J. Ribustello as Fast Freddie
- Carol Duboc as Pumpkin
- Minae Noji as Miss Bangkok
- Arielle Kebbel as Robin
- Kimberly J. Brown as Tiffany
- Margaret Travolta as Marge
- Scott Adsit as Program Director
- Nick Loren as Assistant Director
- Shanell Woodgett as Music Video Dancer
- Dan Brown as Concert Goer
- Jessica Roesener as Concert Goer

=== Cameos ===
- Aerosmith
  - Steven Tyler, Joe Perry, Tom Hamilton, Brad Whitford, Joey Kramer
- Wyclef Jean
- Sergio Mendes
- The Black Eyed Peas
  - will.i.am, Fergie, Taboo, apl.de.ap
- Gene Simmons
- RZA
- Fred Durst
- Anna Nicole Smith
- The Pussycat Dolls
  - Nicole Scherzinger, Ashley Roberts, Kimberly Wyatt, Kasey Campbell
- Russ Irwin
- Jimmy Iovine

Eric Balfour was originally cast as Derek but his scenes were cut and later appeared in the deleted scenes extra in the home media releases.

== Soundtrack ==
The film's soundtrack was released on March 1, 2005.

No.	Title	Length
1.	"Fantasy" (Earth, Wind & Fire)	3:46
2.	"Hollywood Swinging" (Kool & the Gang)	3:26
3.	"Be Thankful for What You Got" (William DeVaughn)	5:45
4.	"Roda" (Elis Regina)	2:35
5.	"Sexy" (The Black Eyed Peas)	4:44
6.	"Suga Suga (Reggae Remix)" (Baby Bash)	4:10
7.	"The Boss" (James Brown)	3:12
8.	"Ain't No Reason" (Christina Milian)	3:12
9.	"Believer" (Christina Milian)	3:14
10.	"Brand New Old Skool" (777)	4:34
11.	"G's and Soldiers" (Planet Asia featuring Kurupt)	4:12
12.	"Cool Chill (Instrumental)" (John Powell)	3:56
13.	"A Cowboy's Work Is Never Done" (Sonny & Cher)	3:15
14.	"You Ain't Woman Enough" (Loretta Lynn, performed by The Rock in the film)	3:31

Songs featured in the film but not included on the soundtrack are:

- "Act a Ass" – E-40
- "Autumn Blue"
- "Best of My Love" – Christina Milian, Carol Duboc, and Minae Noji
- "Beethoven's 9th" – Dean Hurley
- "Brazilian Day" – XMAN
- "Chattanooga Choo Choo" – Steve Lucky & The Rhumba Bums
- "Cooliest" – Jimi Englund
- "Cryin'" – Aerosmith and Christina Milian
- "Deanstone" – Dean Hurley
- "(Everytime I Hear) That Mellow Saxophone" – Steve Lucky & The Rhumba Bums
- "Heistus Interruptus"
- "Kiss Me" – Sixpence None the Richer
- "Knockin' On Heaven's Door" – Bob Dylan
- "Lady Marmalade – Carol Duboc and Minae Noji
- "La Primavera"
- "Melbourne Mansion"
- "Marvelous Things" – Eisley (video visible in background)
- "Me So Horny" – 2 Live Crew
- "Moving On"
- "Praia de Genipabu" – Barbara Mendes
- "Rock It Like Diss" – Jahmaal Rashad
- "Santa Monica Man" – Dean Hurley
- "Short Pimp" – Noah Lifschey and Dylan Berry
- "Strings in Velvet" – Manfred Minnich
- "Travel Russia #2" – The Dollhouse Players
- "Wild Out" – Cheming (featuring XMAN)

== Release ==
=== Box office ===
On a production budget of $53–75 million, Be Cool grossed $56 million in North America and $39.2 million internationally, totaling up to $95.2 million worldwide.

=== Critical reception ===
On the review aggregator website Rotten Tomatoes, 29% of 167 critics' reviews are positive, with an average rating of 4.6/10. The website's consensus reads: "Be Cool is tepid, square, and lukewarm; as a parody of the music business, it has two left feet." Metacritic, which uses a weighted average, assigned the film a score of 37 out of 100, based on 38 critics, indicating "generally unfavorable" reviews. Audiences polled by CinemaScore gave the film an average grade of "B−" on an A+ to F scale.

Roger Ebert of the Chicago Sun-Times called it "A classic species of bore: a self-referential movie with no self to refer to. One character after another, one scene after another, one cute line of dialogue after another, refers to another movie, a similar character, a contrasting image, or whatever." Leslie Halliwell called it "a palpable miss, a movie so lazy and laid back that it falls over; there are none of those insights ... that made Get Shorty so enjoyable".

In an August 2015 interview with Deadline, director F. Gary Gray discussed the failure of the film, stating: "With Be Cool, I made some assumptions in thinking that movie was going to work. I'd just made a successful PG-13 movie [The Italian Job], and when I walked into Be Cool, it was rated R and then at the last minute in preproduction I was told, 'Well, you have to make this PG-13.' I should have walked off the film. This was a movie about shylocks and gangsta rappers and if you can't make that world edgy, you probably shouldn't do it. I walked in thinking I was going to make one movie and then it changed. Maybe it was arrogant of me to think because I had success in this realm of PG-13 I could make that work."
