= Kimberly Quinn (actress) =

American actress

- Other names: Kim Pita Quinn, Kim Quinn, Kimberly Quinn-Melfi
- Occupation: Actress
- Years active: 1995–present
- Spouse: Theodore Melfi

Kimberly Pita Quinn is an American actress, writer and film producer. She made her film debut playing a leading role and co-writing in the 1999 independent drama film Winding Roads. Quinn later produced and played supporting roles in a number of films, include St. Vincent (2014), Hidden Figures (2016), and The Starling (2020). She is married to director Theodore Melfi, together they own production company Goldenlight Films.

== Career ==
Quinn began her career appearing in an episodes of television shows include Ned and Stacey, Suddenly Susan, Nash Bridges, Diagnosis: Murder, NYPD Blue, Without a Trace and House. In 1999, she co-wrote and played a leading role in the independent drama film Winding Roads directed by her future husband Theodore Melfi. After decade of small parts, in 2010, she took series regular role in the FX drama series Terriers. The series was canceled after one season. From 2013 to 2014, she starred as Tess Masterson in the ABC Family drama series Twisted.

In 2014, Quinn co-starred and co-produced comedy-drama St. Vincent starring Bill Murray and Melissa McCarthy. She co-produced 2016 Academy Award for Best Picture-nominated biographical drama film Hidden Figures starring Taraji P. Henson. The following year, she produced black comedy El Camino Christmas for Netflix, and had a recurring role in the Netflix thriller Gypsy. In 2019, she executive produced with her production company Goldenlight Films, and co-starred in the ABC comedy pilot Nana starring Katey Sagal. Later she and Melfi produced drama film The Starling starring Melissa McCarthy. Quinn also co-wrote and produced animated film The Fourteenth Goldfish alongside Melfi.

== Personal life ==
Quinn is married to writer-director Theodore Melfi. Together, they own production company Goldenlight Films.

== Filmography ==
=== Film ===
Year	Title	Role	Notes
1999	Winding Roads	Rene Taylor	Also co-writer and co-producer
2005	Pulled Over	Wife	Short film
2006	End Game	Thelma	Direct-to-video
2007	Look	Joan Krebbs	
2008	Blind	Kelly Lewis	Short film
2008	The Beneficiary	Margaret Williams	Short film
2010	I Want Candy	Carol	Short film, also producer
2010	Roshambo	Carol Burgess	Short film, also producer
2010	Bed & Breakfast	Amanda	
2013	A Little Game	Laura	
2014	St. Vincent	Nurse Ana	Also associate producer
2015	Frayed	Elle	Short film
2016	Hidden Figures	Ruth	Also co-producer
2017	El Camino Christmas	Jewels Daniels	Also producer
2018	The Take Off	Myrtle Mayburn	Short film
2020	No Escape	Laura Turner	
2021	The Starling	Regina	Also producer
2022	American Dreamer	Maggie	

=== Television ===
Year	Title	Role	Notes
1995	Partners	Janet	Episode: "Who's Janet?"
1995	Ned & Stacey	Rhonda	Episode: "Halloween Story"
1998	Suddenly Susan	Julie	Guest role; 2 episodes
1998	Nash Bridges	Rebecca Taylor	Episode: "Apocalypse Nash"
2001	Diagnosis: Murder	Ellen Sharp	Episode: "Dance of Danger"
2002	Without Warning	Ellen Sharp	Television film
2004	I'm with Her	Laura Malone	Episode: "The Heartbreak Kid"
2004	Strong Medicine	Linder Kerrigan	Episode: "Healing Touch"
2004	Cold Case	Kay Lang 1953	Episode: "Red Glare"
2004	NYPD Blue	Annabelle Rhulen 'Matheson'	Episode: "I Love My Wives, But Oh You Kid"
2006	Courting Alex	Cassandra	Guest role; 2 episodes
2006	Without a Trace	Stephanie Heller	Episode: "The Little Things"
2007	Murder 101: College Can Be Murder	Kelly Fogelle	Television film
2006–2007	House M.D.	Nurse Wendy	Episodes: "Fools for Love" and "Insensitive"
2007–2008	Two and a Half Men	Donna	Guest role; 2 episodes
2008	CSI: NY	Bonnie Dillard	Episode: "Right Next Door"
2009	Possible Side Effects	Lynn Hunt Salinger	Unsold Television pilot
2009	The Secret Life of the American Teenager	Woman	Episode: "Knocked Up, Who's There?"
2010	Terriers	Gretchen	Main role; 13 episodes
2012	Up All Night	Dawn	Episode: "Baby Fever"
2013–2014	Twisted	Tess Masterson	Main role; 20 episodes
2016	Grey's Anatomy	Reena Thompson	Episode: "Catastrophe and the Cure"
2017	Gypsy	Holly Faitelson	Recurring role; 5 episodes
2019	Nana		Executive producer, ABC pilot
