= St. Vincent (film) =

2014 film

- Theatrical release poster
- Directed by: Theodore Melfi
- Written by: Theodore Melfi
- Produced by: Fred Roos; Jenno Topping; Peter Chernin; Theodore Melfi
- Starring: Bill Murray; Melissa McCarthy; Naomi Watts; Chris O'Dowd; Terrence Howard; Jaeden Lieberher
- Cinematography: John Lindley
- Edited by: Sarah Flack; Peter Teschner
- Music by: Theodore Shapiro
- Production companies: Chernin Entertainment; Crescendo Productions
- Distributed by: The Weinstein Company
- Release dates: September 5, 2014 (TIFF); October 24, 2014 (United States)
- Running time: 102 minutes
- Country: United States
- Language: English
- Budget: $13 million
- Box office: $54.8 million

St. Vincent is a 2014 American comedy drama film written, directed, and co-produced by Theodore Melfi. The film stars Bill Murray as the title character and it features Melissa McCarthy, Naomi Watts, Chris O'Dowd, Terrence Howard, and Jaeden Lieberher in his film debut.

The film had its premiere at the 2014 Toronto International Film Festival where it was voted second runner-up for the People's Choice Award. It received a limited theatrical release on October 10, 2014, and expanded to a wide release on October 24. The same day, it was released on Netflix in France. The film was a moderate commercial success, grossing $54.8 million against its $13.5 million budget, and received positive reviews from critics.

== Plot ==
Vincent MacKenna is a retired, melancholic Vietnam War veteran living in Sheepshead Bay, who smokes, gambles and has a drinking problem. His wife, Sandy, has Alzheimer's and no longer recognizes him, but he poses as a doctor to visit her and does her laundry. Vincent's only close friends are his cat Felix and a pregnant Russian sex worker named Daka. Despite his rough persona, Vincent has acquaintances who admire and care about him.

Vincent's 30-year-old Chrysler LeBaron gets hit by a branch felled by his new neighbors' moving van. Maggie Bronstein, a radiology tech in the midst of a bitter divorce, and her son Oliver meet Vincent, who demands payment for the damage to his car and fence (the damage to the fence he had actually done himself). Maggie does her best to provide for Oliver, who is intelligent and kind-hearted but bullied at his Catholic school. On his first day at his school, Oliver's phone, wallet, and house keys are stolen by his classmate Robert. Oliver asks Vincent if he can stay at his home until his mother comes home from work. Vincent offers to continue "babysitting" for a fee.

Vincent picks up Oliver daily after school because Maggie often works late shifts. Vincent's ideas of after-school activities involve visits to racetracks and drinking in bars. Vincent teaches Oliver how to defend himself from bullies, resulting in Oliver breaking the nose of Robert, who later apologizes and gives back what he stole. Vincent and Oliver win a high-odds bet on the horses, enabling Vincent to pay off some of his debts. After staff in Sandy's nursing home remind him that he is behind on fees and tell him Sandy will be moved the next week if he does not pay what he owes in full, Vincent steals money from an account he set up for Oliver with their winnings from the track. He takes the money to the racetrack and gambles this money away hoping for a big win.

Vincent is confronted in his home by loan sharks Zucko and Antwan who attempt to take Sandy's jewelry. Vincent collapses while Zucko and Antwan leave him on the floor. Oliver finds him and calls emergency services. Vincent is hospitalized, told he has had a stroke, and has to undergo physical therapy. Oliver, Maggie, and Daka help Vincent recover, but his language remains stunted.

Vincent becomes depressed after finding out that Sandy died while he was hospitalized. He is given a box containing her few belongings and her ashes. Meanwhile, Oliver's father blindsides Maggie in court with photographs of Vincent taking Oliver to inappropriate places. Now forced to share joint custody, a furious Maggie tells Vincent that he can no longer see Oliver.

For his "Saints Among Us" school project, Oliver asks around the neighborhood about Vincent's past. Later, he nominates Vincent at the school's assembly, publicly declaring him “St. Vincent of Sheepshead Bay” and presenting him with a medal. Oliver's rationale comes from his teacher's definition of sainthood as a person showing commitment, dedication and sacrifice. Vincent fits this in terms of his wife; he also saved two fellow soldiers during the Vietnam War. The school audience is impressed by Oliver's speech and applaud Vincent, who has been tricked into attending the event by Daka.

Some time later, Daka gives birth to a baby girl named Victoria and she, along with Maggie, Oliver, and Robert, go to Vincent's house, where they eat together as a surrogate family.

== Cast ==
- Bill Murray as Vincent MacKenna, Maggie and Oliver's neighbor.
- Jaeden Martell (credited as Jaeden Lieberher) as Oliver Bronstein, Maggie's son.
- Melissa McCarthy as Maggie Bronstein, Oliver's mother.
- Naomi Watts as Daka Parimova, a pregnant Russian sex worker and Vincent's friend, later his second wife.
- Chris O'Dowd as Brother Geraghty, Oliver's teacher, an Irish priest.
- Terrence Howard as Zucko, Vincent's loan shark.
- Lenny Venito as Coach Mitchell, Oliver's P.E. teacher.
- Nate Corddry as Terry, a bank clerk.
- Dario Barosso as Robert Ocinski, Oliver's classmate who bullies him and later becomes his friend.
- Kimberly Quinn as Ana, a nurse at Sandy's nursing home.
- Donna Mitchell as Sandy MacKenna, Vincent's wife who has Alzheimer's disease.
- Ann Dowd as Shirley, Sandy's nursing home director.
- Scott Adsit as David Bronstein, Maggie's ex-husband and Oliver's father.
- Reg E. Cathey as Gus
- Deirdre O'Connell as Linda
- Ray Iannicelli as Roger, a bartender
- Ron McLarty as Principal O'Brien, Oliver's school principal.
- Maria Elena Ramirez as Amelda, a Latina nanny
- Emma Fisher as Bridgette

== Production ==
The screenplay, originally titled St. Vincent de Van Nuys, was written in 2011 by Melfi, and was included on the Hollywood Black List (the best unproduced scripts) of 2011.

Jack Nicholson was rumored to star in the film, but Murray signed on in July 2012. On March 11, 2013, Melissa McCarthy was offered the lead female part and joined the cast. On March 22, Chris O'Dowd joined the cast as a Catholic priest. Naomi Watts joined the cast on April 22 in the role of a Russian prostitute. On July 19, Scott Adsit joined the cast to play McCarthy's character's ex-husband.

=== Filming ===
Filming began the first week of July 2013, with scenes filmed in Brooklyn, New York and at Belmont Park in Elmont, Long Island, New York.

=== Music ===
On December 26, 2013, Theodore Shapiro was hired to score the film. Sony Classical Records released the soundtrack album on October 27, 2014.

== Marketing ==
The first official trailer for the film was released on July 1, 2014.

== Release ==
The Weinstein Company released the film on October 10, 2014, in limited engagements, before making an expansion into wide release on October 24, 2014.

== Reception ==
On Rotten Tomatoes, the film holds an approval rating of 77% based on 193 reviews, with an average rating of 6.8/10. The consensus reads, "St. Vincent offers the considerable pleasure of seeing Bill Murray back in funny form, but drifts into dangerously sentimental territory along the way." On Metacritic, the film has a weighted average score of 64 out of 100 based on 40 reviews, indicating "generally favorable reviews". Audiences polled by CinemaScore gave the film an average grade of "A−" on an A+ to F scale.

Richard Roeper gave the film a grade of "A", saying Murray's performance could "mean a Golden Globe".

=== Accolades ===
List of accolades received by St. Vincent
Year	Award	Category	Recipients	Result
2014	Toronto International Film Festival	People's Choice Award	Theodore Melfi	Nominated
2014	Toronto International Film Festival	Masters Award	Theodore Melfi	3rd Place
2014	Chicago International Film Festival	Audience Choice Award	Theodore Melfi	Nominated
2014	Heartland Film Festival	Truly Moving Picture Award	Theodore Melfi	Won
2014	Indiana Film Journalists Association Awards	Best Supporting Actress	Melissa McCarthy	Runner-Up
2014	Indiana Film Journalists Association Awards	Best Picture	Theodore Melfi	Nominated
2014	Indiana Film Journalists Association Awards	Best Director	Theodore Melfi	Nominated
2014	Washington D.C. Film Critics Association	Best Youth Performance	Jaeden Lieberher	Nominated
2014	Las Vegas Film Critics Society Awards	Youth in Film	Jaeden Lieberher	Won
2014	St. Louis Film Critics Association Awards	Best Comedy	Theodore Melfi	Nominated
2015	Screen Actors Guild Awards	Outstanding Supporting Actress	Naomi Watts	Nominated
2015	Phoenix Film Critics Society Awards	Best Performance by a Youth- Male	Jaeden Lieberher	Won
2015	Golden Globe Awards	Best Motion Picture - Musical or Comedy	Theodore Melfi	Nominated
2015	Golden Globe Awards	Best Actor - Musical or Comedy	Bill Murray	Nominated
2015	Broadcast Film Critics' Association Awards	Best Comedy	Theodore Melfi	Nominated
2015	Broadcast Film Critics' Association Awards	Best Actor in a Comedy	Bill Murray	Nominated
2015	Broadcast Film Critics' Association Awards	Best Actress in a Comedy	Melissa McCarthy	Nominated
2015	Broadcast Film Critics' Association Awards	Best Young Actor/Actress	Jaeden Lieberher	Nominated
2015	Casting Society of America	Studio or Independent Comedy	Laura Rosenthal	Nominated
2015	Make-Up Artists and Hair Stylists Guild Awards	Best Contemporary Hair Styling in Feature Length Motion Picture	Suzy Mazzarese-Allison	Nominated
2015	2015 YouReviewers Movie Awards	Breakthrough Actor	Jaeden Lieberher	Nominated
