= Jeffrey L. Kimball =

American cinematographer (born 1943)

- Born: May 29, 1943 (age 83); Wichita, Kansas, USA
- Years active: 1971–2018
- Spouse: Eileen Sue Fisher

Jeffrey Lane Kimball, ASC (born May 29, 1943) is an American cinematographer, known mainly for shooting action films, especially the ones directed by Tony Scott and John Woo.

== Career ==
He majored in radio and television at North Texas State University in 1964. After graduation he landed a trainee position with Warner Brothers, but left to work as a gofer for still photographer Bill Langley. In 1969, he left Hollywood to work as a director of photography for the Dallas office of TV commercial production company N. Lee Lacy/Associates. He returned to Hollywood permanently in 1972 where he worked—mainly on low budget films—as an lab technician, still photographer, assistant director, and assistant cameraman, graduating to second unit director of photography on Hell Raiders, It's Alive, Cat People and others. Before becoming a feature film cinematographer, he had "earned his reputation for innovative and sometimes risky cinematography" in commercials, many of which had won awards.

In addition to his work in features, he continues to work as a cinematographer on commercials and music videos. He also directs commercials, e.g. for Maketa Armada.

Kimball has been nominated for a Golden Satellite Award in 2001 for Mission: Impossible 2 and an MTV Video Music Award in 2011 for Beyoncé's "Run the World (Girls)."

He has been a member of the American Society of Cinematographers since 1990.

== Filmography ==
=== Film ===
Year	Title	Director	Notes
1971	On the Line	Lee Stanley	Documentary film
1985	The Legend of Billie Jean	Matthew Robbins	
1986	Top Gun	Tony Scott	
1987	Beverly Hills Cop II	Tony Scott	
1990	Revenge	Tony Scott	
1990	Jacob's Ladder	Adrian Lyne	
1991	Curly Sue	John Hughes	
1993	True Romance	Tony Scott	
1994	The Specialist	Luis Llosa	
1998	Wild Things	John McNaughton	
1999	Stigmata	Rupert Wainwright	
2000	Mission: Impossible 2	John Woo	Nominated- Satellite Award for Best Cinematography
2002	Windtalkers	John Woo	
2002	The Hire	John Woo	Segment "Hostage"
2002	Star Trek: Nemesis	Stuart Baird	
2003	Paycheck	John Woo	
2004	The Big Bounce	George Armitage	
2005	Be Cool	F. Gary Gray	
2006	Glory Road	James Gartner	With John Toon
2006	Bonneville	Christopher N. Rowley	
2008	Four Christmases	Seth Gordon	
2009	Old Dogs	Walt Becker	
2010	The Expendables	Sylvester Stallone	
2011	Valley of the Sun	Stokes McIntyre	
2011	The Double	Michael Brandt	
2018	Glass Jaw	Jeff Celentano	

=== Music video ===
Year	Title	Artist	Director
2010	"Beautiful Dangerous"	Slash feat. Fergie	Rich Lee
2010	"Coming Home"	Diddy – Dirty Money	Rich Lee
2011	"Run the World (Girls)"	Beyoncé	Francis Lawrence
2011	"Don't Wanna Go Home"	Jason Derulo	Rich Lee
2011	"Lighters"	Bad Meets Evil feat. Bruno Mars	Rich Lee
2011	"T.H.E. (The Hardest Ever)"	will.i.am	Rich Lee
2012	"Favorite Song"	Colbie Caillat feat. Common	Jay Martin
2013	"Say Something (A Great Big World song)"	A Great Big World and Christina Aguilera	Christopher Sims
2016	"Team"	Iggy Azalea	Fabien Montique
