= Get Shorty =

1991 novel by Elmore Leonard

- First edition (publ. Delacorte Press)
- Author: Elmore Leonard
- Language: English
- Publication date: 1990

Get Shorty is a 1990 novel by American novelist Elmore Leonard. In 1995, the novel was adapted into an eponymous film, and in 2017 it was adapted into a television series of the same name.

== Plot summary ==
The story is about Ernesto "Chili" Palmer, a small-time loan shark based in Miami. After learning that his operation has been turned over to an old enemy, Ray "Bones" Barboni, Chili flies to Las Vegas in pursuit of Leo Devoe, a dry cleaner who has scammed an airline out of $300,000 in life insurance by faking his death in a plane crash, and who owes a $10,000 gambling debt to Chili's employers.

After relieving Leo of the money in Vegas, Chili impulsively gambles it all away. To avoid returning home empty-handed, he goes to the casino's security director and is offered the chance to collect from Harry Zimm, a veteran horror film producer based in Los Angeles. Chili, interested in the movie business, heads for Los Angeles to make Zimm pay.

Chili sneaks into the house of "scream queen" actress Karen Flores, where Harry is staying, in the night. After he warns Harry to pay his Las Vegas markers, he explains that he has an idea for a movie. Harry is immediately taken in by Chili's charm and his movie premise. For the movie's plot, Chili recounts Leo's story to Harry in the third person, as if it were a work of fiction. Karen recognizes the premise as a true story and identifies Chili as the unnamed shylock.

The next morning, Harry asks for Chili's help in dealing with a movie script for Mr. Lovejoy he wants to buy from his writer's widow, Doris Saffron, who wants $500,000 for it and he guaranteed a $200,000 investment from Bo Catlett, a local limo driver and drug dealer, to make another movie, Freaks. (Harry gambled Bo's $200,000 away in Vegas in hopes of making the $500,000 he needed for Mr. Lovejoy). In a meeting with Bo, Harry and Chili tell them that their investment in Freaks is sound but they are making another movie first. Bo tells them to move the money into the new picture; Harry says he cannot since the new movie deal is "structured".

Bo is involved in a Mexican drug deal that falls through. He has left the payment in a locker at the Los Angeles airport but the Colombian sent to receive the money, Yayo, does not feel safe unlocking the locker with so many DEA agents nearby. Bo later meets Yayo at the limo garage and after Yayo threatens to tell the DEA who Bo is, Bo shoots him.

Bo soon offers the locker money to Harry as an investment and tells him to send Chili to get the money. Chili senses something wrong, signs out a nearby locker as a test and is taken for questioning by DEA agents. After the questioning, Chili seeks the interests of Michael Weir, a top-tier Hollywood actor to play the lead in "Mr. Lovejoy".

Ray Barboni, after learning about Leo's money from his wife, comes to Los Angeles looking for the money Chili collected from Leo, only to find the key to the locker from the failed drug deal in one of Chili's pockets. Thinking Chili has stashed his cash in a locker, he goes to the airport and is busted by drug officials.

In a final showdown with Bo, Chili is held at gunpoint. One of Bo's henchmen, known as the Bear, arrives just in time to apprehend Bo, and in the struggle for the gun, Bo falls through the railing of his sun deck. As Chili recounts his story to Karen and Harry, he shares some comparisons with Mr. Lovejoy.

== Adaptations ==
The novel served as the basis for a Get Shorty franchise. This included: the 1995 film adaptation; a sequel titled Be Cool was released 2005, which was based on the novel of the same name; and the Get Shorty TV series was released through Epix from August 2017 – November 2019. Ray Romano and Chris O'Dowd star in the series. The first season premiered on August 13, 2017.
