= Coen brothers' unrealized projects =

During their long careers, American filmmakers Joel and Ethan Coen have worked on a number of projects which never progressed beyond the pre-production stage under their direction. Some of these productions fell in development hell or were cancelled.

== 1980s ==
=== Suburbicon ===
In 1986, the Coen brothers wrote the script Suburbicon, and had intended on directing the film themselves, but it was put aside and shelved in favor of other projects at the time. Later, in the 2000s, they sought out the script from Warner Bros., who owned the rights, and rewrote it with a contemporary setting and with George Clooney in mind to star. Clooney ultimately directed Suburbicon himself, with a script rewritten by Grant Heslov to take place in 1957.

== 1990s ==
=== To the White Sea ===
In March 1997, it was reported in Variety that the Coens were in discussions at Universal Pictures to direct Brad Pitt in an adaptation of James Dickey's To the White Sea, scripted by David and Janet Peoples. In August 2000, Pitt officially signed on to star in the film. They were due to start production in 2002, with Jeremy Thomas producing, but it was cancelled when the Coens felt that the budget offered was not enough to successfully produce the film. The Houston Chronicle reported that "no studio would fund the film." In August 2015, it was announced that Warner Bros. acquired the film rights to the book and that their screenplay was scrapped and that another writer and/or director would replace them.

=== Cuba Libre ===
In July 1997, the Coens agreed to adapt Elmore Leonard's next novel Cuba Libre, for Universal Pictures, however the two made no official commitment to direct at the time.

=== LaBrava ===
In March 1998, the Los Angeles Times reported that the Coen brothers had written an adaptation of Elmore Leonard's 1983 novel LaBrava, also for Universal.

=== The Contemplations ===
In an April 1998 interview with Alex Simon for Venice magazine, the Coens discussed a project called The Contemplations, which was to have been an anthology of short films based on stories in a leather bound book from a "dusty old library". This project may have influenced or evolved into The Ballad of Buster Scruggs (2018), which has the same structure.

== 2000s ==
=== Untitled Ed Harris film ===
In 2001, the brothers mentioned to The Guardian that they'd written a screenplay for Ed Harris to direct. No further details were provided.

=== 62 Skidoo ===
It was reported in 2004 that the Coen brothers were to make a Cold War-related comedy film project titled 62 Skidoo. Nicolas Cage was attached to the project.

=== Untitled Spaghetti Western ===
On the heels of the success of No Country for Old Men (2007), news broke that the Coen brothers were desperate to make a Spaghetti Western they'd written about the days of cowboys and Indians battling it out in the wild west of America. It was described as their "goriest" film to date, and was to feature scenes of primitive torture methods. "There's scalping and hanging... it's good," said Joel. "Indians torturing people with ants, cutting their eyelids off." Ethan added: "It's a proper Western, a real Western, set in the 1870s. It's got a scene that no one will ever forget because of one particular chicken."

=== The Yiddish Policemen's Union ===
In 2008, it was announced that the Coen brothers were to write and direct a film adaptation of Michael Chabon's novel The Yiddish Policemen's Union for Columbia Pictures. Scott Rudin, who collaborated with the brothers in No Country for Old Men (2007), was to have served as producer. When asked about the status of the project in 2015, Chabon confirmed: "Nothing. The Coen brothers wrote a draft of the script and then they seemed to move on. The rights have lapsed back to me."

=== Old Fink ===
In 2009, the Coens stated that they were interested in making a sequel to their film Barton Fink (1991) called Old Fink, which would take place in the 1960s, around the same time period as A Serious Man (2009). The Coens also stated they had talks with John Turturro in reprising his role as Fink, but that they were waiting "until he was actually old enough to play the part".

== 2010s ==
=== Harve Karbo TV series ===
In 2011, the Coens were working on a television project, called Harve Karbo, about a quirky Los Angeles private eye, for Imagine Television.

=== Untitled musical comedy ===
In September 2013, the Coens stated in an interview that they were working on a new musical comedy centered around an opera singer, though they said it is "not a musical per se".

=== Untitled sword-and-sandal epic ===
In an interview conducted with the Coen brothers in December 2013, the two expressed their involvement in a sprawling sword-and-sandal epic set in ancient Rome.

=== Black Money ===
In August 2015, it was announced that Warner Bros. had optioned the film rights to the Ross Macdonald mystery novel Black Money for the Coen brothers to potentially write and direct.

=== The Zebra-Striped Hearse ===
The Coens have also written an as-yet-unproduced screenplay based on Macdonald's The Zebra-Striped Hearse, for producer Joel Silver. Silver first spoke of the project in May 2016. In 2023, it was rumored that the brothers would possibly reunite to co-direct The Zebra-Striped Hearse, though Joel would deny this. He elaborated that he and Ethan had been hired years ago to adapt some Macdonald novels, but that he didn't know who was currently attached to make it.

=== Dark Web ===
It was reported in October 2016 that the Coens would work on the screenplay for Fox titled Dark Web, based on Joshuah Bearman's two-part Wired article about Ross Ulbricht and his illicit Silk Road online marketplace. The project originated in 2013, with novelist Dennis Lehane on board for the screenplay. Chernin Entertainment would produce.

=== Scarface remake ===
On February 10, 2017, it was announced that the Scarface remake's script was being written by the Coens. Luca Guadagnino announced plans to direct the film.

== 2020s ==
=== Untitled horror film ===
In July 2023, Ethan disclosed that he would be reuniting with his brother Joel to direct a new film together, after their temporary split to pursue solo ventures. In January 2024, he confirmed that they had both finished writing the script in the summer, revealing it to be "a pure horror film," noting that "if you like Blood Simple, I think you'll enjoy it." Ethan's wife Tricia Cooke also added that their script was "horribly funny." The following month, Ethan told the Times Colonist that the plan was for him to next shoot Honey Don't! before embarking with Joel on the planned horror film from their original screenplay. According to Ethan, they had both had the idea for a long time before writing it and that it was "in a mental drawer." It was rumored to start shooting in the fall that year. TheWrap teased that with the film, the Coens promise to deliver "a lot of fake blood. And ... feathers?"

=== Go, Beavers! ===
In early 2024, a proposed follow-up to Ethan's solo debut Drive-Away Dolls entitled Go Beavers was revealed. "It's about a reunion of a college crew team. But it's pretty trashy," he said at the time. It was mooted by Ethan and his wife Tricia Cooke as the third entry in a "lesbian B movie trilogy", coming after Drive-Away Dolls and a second called Honey Don't. However, in May 2025, Ethan stated that there were "no definite plans to do a third [film]." That month, he also expounded that the film would fit within the "man and God" category of films such as Walkabout and Deliverance except "it's a lesbian movie, so it's 'woman and God.'"

=== Untitled future collaboration ===
On May 16, 2025, Ethan stated in an interview for The Hollywood Reporter that he and Joel had "an old thing that we've written" in addition to the untitled horror film and a possible new project that they would co-write together. The brothers jointly corroborated this sentiment the year following, telling AFP that a reunion would be coming "soon" and was unlikely to be fantasy or horror-based, but remained undecided: "We have a number of different things in what we call 'the library'; things that we've written before. And then other things that we've thought about writing scripts about and never gotten around. So we don't know yet."

=== Untitled Ethan Coen solo film ===
On May 28, 2025, in an interview for Collider, Ethan would express uncertainty as to what his next solo feature would be, naming several possibilities. "Me and Trish have talked about [doing Go Beavers], and actually started other scripts. We don't know what we're doing next," he said.

== See also ==
- Coen brothers filmography
