= List of produced films included in The Black List (2006–2009) =

The following is a detailed and ordered list of films belonging to "The Black List" and that have already been produced and released in theaters or via streaming.

== 2006 ==
Release		Title	Written by	Production company	Notes	Ref
J A N U A R Y	—	The Sasquatch Gang	Tim Skousen	Madman Films	The film premiered at the Slamdance Film Festival, where it won the Audience Award	
J A N U A R Y	20	Little Miss Sunshine	Michael Arndt	Big Beach Films / Bona Fide Productions / Deep River Productions / Third Gear Productions	The film premiered at the Sundance Film Festival and its distribution rights were bought by Fox Searchlight Pictures for one of the biggest deals made in the history of the festival until that date	
J A N U A R Y	21	The Hawk Is Dying	Harry Crews	This Is That Productions	The film premiered at the 2006 Sundance Film Festival, and was also accepted to the 2006 Director's Fortnight Competition at the Cannes Film Festival	
F E B R U A R Y	17	Eight Below	David DiGillio	Walt Disney Pictures / Spyglass Entertainment / Mandeville Films / The Kennedy/Marshall Company		
F E B R U A R Y	17	Freedomland	Richard Price	Columbia Pictures / Revolution Studios		
F E B R U A R Y	24	Lucky Number Slevin	Jason Smilovic	The Weinstein Company / Capitol Films / Ascendant Pictures		
M A Y	23	Babel	Guillermo Arriaga	Anonymous Content / Zeta Film / Central Films / Media Rights Capital	The film was selected to compete for the Palme d'Or at the 2006 Cannes Film Festival, where González Iñárritu won the Best Director Award	
J U N E	16	The Fast and the Furious: Tokyo Drift	Chris Morgan	Universal Pictures / Relativity Media		
J U N E	16	Nacho Libre	Jared Hess	Nickelodeon Movies / Black & White		
A U G U S T	9	World Trade Center	Andrea Berloff	Paramount Pictures		
A U G U S T	31	Infamous	Douglas McGrath	Arclight Films	The film premiered at the August 2006 Venice Film Festival	
S E P T E M B E R	2	The Queen	Peter Morgan	Granada Productions / Pathé Renn Productions / BIM Distribuzione / France 3 Cinéma / Canal+	The film garnered general critical and popular acclaim for Mirren playing the title role, which earned her numerous awards, namely the Academy Award, the BAFTA Award, and the Golden Globe Award	
S E P T E M B E R	11	Pu-239	Scott Z. Burns	Beacon Pictures / HBO Films	The film was shown twice at the 2006 Toronto International Film Festival under the title The Half Life of Timofey Berezin before being distributed by HBO Films under its original working title	
S E P T E M B E R	18	Studio 60 on the Sunset Strip	Aaron Sorkin	Warner Bros. Television	The series was adapted from the original script Studio 7 by Aaron Sorkin. The first episode was aired on September 18, 2006	
O C T O B E R	1	Dexter	James Manos Jr.	The Colleton Company / John Goldwyn Productions / Showtime Networks / Clyde Phillips Productions / 801 Productions / Devilina Productions	The series was adapted from the original script of the same name by James Manos Jr. The first episode was aired on October 1, 2006	
O C T O B E R	6	Little Children	Todd Field	Bona Fide / Standard Film Company	The film screened at the 44th New York Film Festival organized by the Film Society of Lincoln Center. It earned 3 nominations at the 79th Academy Awards: Best Actress for Winslet, Best Supporting Actor for Haley, and Best Adapted Screenplay for Field and Perrotta	
O C T O B E R	15	The Hoax	William Wheeler	Miramax Films / Bob Yari Productions / The Mark Gordon Company / City Entertainment	The film screened at the Rome Film Fest and it was ranked as one of the Top 10 of the year by the Los Angeles Times and Newsweek.	
N O V E M B E R	10	Fur	Erin Cressida Wilson	River Road Entertainment		
D E C E M B E R	1	Turistas	Michael Arlen Ross	Fox Atomic / 2929 Entertainment / Stone Village Productions / BoZ Productions	It was the first American film to be exclusively shot in Brazil	
D E C E M B E R	8	Blood Diamond	Charles Leavitt	Bedford Falls Productions / Virtual Studios / Initial Entertainment Group	The film grossed US$171 million worldwide and received five Oscar nominations, including Best Actor for Leonardo DiCaprio and Best Supporting Actor for Djimon Hounsou	
D E C E M B E R	9	Black Snake Moan	Craig Brewer	New Deal Productions / Southern Cross the Dog Productions	The film premiered at the BNAT 2006	
D E C E M B E R	22	We Are Marshall	Jamie Linden	Legendary Pictures / Thunder Road Pictures / Wonderland Sound and Vision		
D E C E M B E R	25	Notes on a Scandal	Patrick Marber	Fox Searchlight Pictures	It was nominated for four Academy Awards – Best Actress, Best Supporting Actress, Best Adapted Screenplay, and Best Original Score	
D E C E M B E R	29	Factory Girl	Captain Mauzner	Lift Productions		

== 2007 ==
Release		Title	Written by	Production company	Notes	Ref
J A N U A R Y	10	The Ten	David Wain / Ken Marino	City Lights Pictures	It premiered at the 2007 Sundance Film Festival	
J A N U A R Y	23	King of California	Mike Cahill	Nu Image Films /Millennium Films /Emmett/Furla Films	It premiered at the 2007 Sundance Film Festival	
J A N U A R Y	25	Chapter 27	Jarrett Schaefer	Peace Arch Entertainment	The film premiered at the 2007 Sundance Film Festival and received the Debut Feature Prize for Schaefer at the Zurich Film Festival	
J A N U A R Y	27	Year of the Dog	Mike White	Plan B Entertainment	It premiered at the 2007 Sundance Film Festival	
F E B R U A R Y	16	Breach	Billy Ray / Adam Mazer / William Rotko	Sidney Kimmel Entertainment		
F E B R U A R Y	23	The Number 23	Fernley Phillips	Contrafilm / Firm Films		
F E B R U A R Y	28	Zodiac	James Vanderbilt	Phoenix Pictures	The film was nominated for several awards, including the Saturn Award for Best Action, Adventure or Thriller Film	
M A R C H	2	Wild Hogs	Brad Copeland	Touchstone Pictures / Tollin/Robbins Productions	It was the last film by Tollin/Robbins Productions. The film was nominated for a People's Choice Award in the category "Favorite Movie Comedy"	
M A R C H	30	Blades of Glory	Jeff Cox / Craig Cox / John Altschuler / Dave Krinsky	DreamWorks Pictures / MTV Films / Red Hour / Smart Entertainment		
A P R I L	4	Disturbia	Christopher Landon / Carl Ellsworth	DreamWorks Pictures / Cold Spring Pictures / The Montecito Picture Company		
A P R I L	13	Pathfinder	Laeta Kalogridis	Phoenix Pictures		
M A Y	1	Charlie Bartlett	Gustin Nash	Sidney Kimmel Entertainment	The film premiered at the Tribeca Film Festival, and was shown at the Cannes Film Market, the Maui Film Festival and the Cambridge Film Festival	
M A Y	21	A Mighty Heart	John Orloff	Plan B Entertainment / Revolution Films	The film was screened out of competition at the 2007 Cannes Film Festival	
M A Y	22	The Diving Bell and the Butterfly	Ronald Harwood	Canal+ / Kennedy/Marshall Company / France 3 Cinéma	The film won awards at the Cannes Film Festival, the Golden Globes, the BAFTAs, and the César Awards, and received four Oscar nominations. Several critics later listed it as one of the best films of its decade. It ranks in BBC's 100 Greatest Films of the 21st Century	
J U N E	—	Dangerous Parking	Peter Howitt	Corniche Pictures / Flaming Pie Films London		
A U G U S T	3	Hot Rod	Pam Brady	Paramount Pictures / Broadway Video		
A U G U S T	10	Stardust	Jane Goldman / Matthew Vaughn	Marv Films / Ingenious Film Partners	In 2008, it won the Hugo Award for Best Dramatic Presentation, Long Form	
A U G U S T	17	Death at a Funeral	Dean Craig	Sidney Kimmel Entertainment	Director Frank Oz won the Audience Award at both the US Comedy Arts Festival and the Locarno International Film Festival	
A U G U S T	17	Superbad	Seth Rogen / Evan Goldberg	Columbia Pictures / The Apatow Company		
A U G U S T	21	3:10 to Yuma	Halsted Welles / Michael Brandt / Derek Haas	Relativity Media / Tree Line Film	The film received two Academy Award nominations for the 80th Academy Awards. Marco Beltrami was nominated for Best Original Score, and Paul Massey, David Giammarco, and Jim Stuebe were nominated for Best Sound Mixing	
A U G U S T	22	The Kingdom	Matthew Michael Carnahan	Relativity Media / Forward Pass / Stuber/Parent	The film premiered at the Edinburgh International Film Festival	
A U G U S T	30	Michael Clayton	Tony Gilroy	Samuels Media / Castle Rock Entertainment / Mirage Enterprises / Section Eight Productions	The film premiered at the 2007 Venice Film Festival. It was nominated for seven Academy Awards: Best Picture, Best Director, Best Original Screenplay, Best Actor for Clooney, Best Supporting Actor for Wilkinson, and Best Supporting Actress for Tilda Swinton, which she won	
S E P T E M B E R	1	Juno	Diablo Cody	Mandate Pictures / Mr. Mudd	It won the Oscar for Best Original Screenplay and earned three other Oscar nominations, including Best Picture and Best Actress for Elliot Page	
S E P T E M B E R	3	The Hunting Party	Richard Shepard	Intermedia / QED International	The film had its world premiere at the 64th Venice International Film Festival	
S E P T E M B E R	7	The Brothers Solomon	Will Forte	TriStar Pictures / Revolution Studios / Carsey-Werner Productions		
S E P T E M B E R	7	Rendition	Kelley Sane	Level 1 Entertainment / Anonymous Content	It was premiered at the Toronto International Film Festival	
S E P T E M B E R	8	The Life Before Her Eyes	Emil Stern	2929 Entertainment	It was premiered at the 2007 Toronto International Film Festival	
S E P T E M B E R	9	Lars and the Real Girl	Nancy Oliver	Metro-Goldwyn-Mayer	The film premiered at the 2007 Toronto International Film Festival. It received an Academy Award nomination for Best Original Screenplay, while Gosling received nominations for the Golden Globe Award for Best Actor – Motion Picture Musical or Comedy and the Screen Actors Guild Award for Outstanding Performance by a Male Actor in a Leading Role	
S E P T E M B E R	9	Meet Bill	Melisa Wallack	GreeneStreet Films	It was premiered at the 2007 Toronto International Film Festival	
S E P T E M B E R	12	Married Life	Ira Sachs / Oren Moverman	Sidney Kimmel Entertainment / Anonymous Content / Firm Films	It was premiered at the 2007 Toronto International Film Festival	
S E P T E M B E R	13	Reservation Road	John Burnham Schwartz / Terry George	Random House Films	It was premiered at the 2007 Toronto International Film Festival	
S E P T E M B E R	23	The Game Plan	Nichole Millard / Kathryn Price	Walt Disney Pictures / Mayhem Pictures	It was the last film to be distributed by Buena Vista Pictures, after Disney retired the Buena Vista moniker across their company's divisions in the same year	
S E P T E M B E R	27	There Will Be Blood	Paul Thomas Anderson	Ghoulardi Film Company / Scott Rudin Productions	At the 2008 Berlin International Film Festival it won the Silver Bear Award for Best Director and a Special Artistic Contribution Award for Jonny Greenwood's score. The film received widespread critical acclaim for its cinematography, direction, screenplay, and the performance of Daniel Day-Lewis. Day-Lewis would go on to win the Oscar, BAFTA, Golden Globe, Screen Actors Guild, NYFCC and IFTA Best Leading Actor awards for the role	
O C T O B E R	19	Things We Lost in the Fire	Allan Loeb	DreamWorks Pictures / Neal Street Productions		
O C T O B E R	26	Dan in Real Life	Pierce Gardner / Peter Hedges	Touchstone Pictures / NALA Films		
N O V E M B E R	8	Lions for Lambs	Matthew Michael Carnahan	United Artists / Cruise/Wagner Productions		
N O V E M B E R	16	Love in the Time of Cholera	Ronald Harwood	Stone Village Pictures		
N O V E M B E R	30	Mama's Boy	Hank Nelken	Warner Bros		
D E C E M B E R	14	The Kite Runner	David Benioff	Participant Productions / Sidney Kimmel Entertainment / Parkes+MacDonald / Neal Street Productions	It was nominated for the Golden Globe Award for Best Foreign Language Film in 2007. The film's score by Alberto Iglesias was nominated for Best Original Score at the Golden Globes and the Academy Awards	
D E C E M B E R	15	The Bucket List	Justin Zackham	Castle Rock Entertainment	The film was chosen by National Board of Review as one of the top ten films of 2007 and was a box office success, opening at #1 in the United States, and grossing US$175.4 million worldwide	
D E C E M B E R	21	Charlie Wilson's War	Aaron Sorkin	Relativity Media / Participant Productions / Playtone	It was nominated for five Golden Globe Awards, including Best Motion Picture – Musical or Comedy, but did not win in any category. Hoffman was nominated for an Academy Award for Best Supporting Actor	
D E C E M B E R	21	Walk Hard: The Dewey Cox Story	Judd Apatow / Jake Kasdan	Columbia Pictures / Relativity Media / Apatow Productions		
