= Hossein Amini =

Iranian-born British screenwriter and film director (born 1966)

- Born: 18 January 1966 (age 60); Tehran, Imperial State of Iran
- Education: Wadham College, Oxford
- Occupations: Screenwriter, film director

Hossein Amini (Persian: حسین امینی; born 18 January 1966) is an Iranian-born British screenwriter and film director who has worked as a screenwriter since the early 1990s. He was nominated for the Academy Award for Best Adapted Screenplay for The Wings of the Dove (1997). He also won a "Best Adapted Screenplay" award from the Austin Film Critics Association for his screenplay adaptation of Nicolas Winding Refn's Drive (2011), based on the novel by James Sallis. For his directorial debut, he both wrote and directed The Two Faces of January, an adaptation of the Patricia Highsmith novel.

== Early life and education ==
Born in Tehran, Imperial State of Iran, Amini spent his early life and attended the British School in Tehran. When he was 11 years old, he and his family moved to England.

Amini attended Bryanston School, a public school in Dorset, and won a scholarship to Wadham College, Oxford, where he read history and modern languages.

== Career ==
=== Screenplays ===
Amini's first screenplay was for the 1994 TV movie The Dying of the Light, directed by Peter Kosminsky. The TV movie told the story of Sean Devereux, an aid worker who was murdered in Somalia in 1993 for criticising arms sales. It was nominated for the "Best Single Drama" at the British Academy Television Awards. Amini also wrote an adapted screenplay of the 1895 novel Jude the Obscure by Thomas Hardy. Producer Andrew Eaton commissioned the screenplay in 1995, and it was filmed by Michael Winterbottom as Jude, released in 1996. Amini also wrote a screenplay for another TV movie, Deep Secrets, which aired in 1996.

Amini wrote the adapted screenplay for The Wings of the Dove, which was based on the 1902 novel of the same name by Henry James. The film, directed by Iain Softley, was released in 1997 and received critical acclaim. Amini was nominated for an Academy Award for Best Writing – Adapted Screenplay.

Amini was one of the screenwriters, along with Michael Schiffer, who wrote a screenplay adaptation of A.E.W. Mason's novel The Four Feathers, which became the film The Four Feathers (2002), directed by Shekhar Kapur and starring Wes Bentley and Heath Ledger. In 2008, he adapted the Elmore Leonard novel Killshot into the screenplay for the film Killshot (2008), directed by John Madden and starring Thomas Jane, Diane Lane, Mickey Rourke, Joseph Gordon-Levitt, and Rosario Dawson.

In 2010, Amini wrote an original screenplay for a film entitled Shanghai directed by Mikael Håfström and starring Chow Yun Fat, Gong Li, Ken Watanabe and John Cusack.

Amini also wrote the screenplay for the neo-noir film Drive (2011), directed by Nicolas Winding Refn. His screenplay for the film is a loose adaptation of the novel of the same name by James Sallis. During interviews, Refn noted that he and Amini cut out a lot of the content from Sallis' book, resulting in the almost bare-bones structure for the film, and the few lines of dialogue for the film's star, Ryan Gosling. For his screenplay of Drive, Amini also won a "Best Adapted Screenplay" award from the Austin Film Critics Association in 2011.

Amini was one of the screenwriters, along with Evan Daughtery and John Lee Hancock, who wrote the screenplay for Snow White and the Huntsman (2012), directed by Rupert Sanders and starring Kristen Stewart, Chris Hemsworth and Charlize Theron. Additionally, Amini is one of the screenwriters, along with Chris Morgan and Walter Hamada, who wrote the screenplay for the film 47 Ronin (2013), directed by Carl Rinsch and starring Keanu Reeves, Hiroyuki Sanada, Tadanobu Asano, Cary-Hiroyuki Tagawa and Rinko Kikuchi.

Amini adapted John le Carré's novel Our Kind of Traitor into a feature film, directed by Susanna White. The film was released in 2016, starring Ewan McGregor, Naomie Harris, and Stellan Skarsgård. He then adapted The Snowman, from the novel by Jo Nesbø. It was a box office disappointment and received negative reviews, with critics calling it "clichéd and uninvolving."

In 2018, Amini began writing for television, with the crime series McMafia and The Alienist. On 27 September 2019, it was announced that Amini would be writing the Star Wars Obi-Wan Kenobi TV series for Disney+ but he departed before production.

=== Directorial work ===
His feature directorial debut, The Two Faces of January (2014), is a film adaptation of a Patricia Highsmith novel for which he also wrote the screenplay. The film stars Viggo Mortensen, Kirsten Dunst and Oscar Isaac.

== Filmography ==
=== Film ===
Year	Title	Director	Writer
1989	Catch (short film)	Yes	Yes
1996	Jude	No	Yes
1997	The Wings of the Dove	No	Yes
2002	The Four Feathers	No	Yes
2002	Gangs of New York	No	Uncredited
2008	Killshot	No	Yes
2010	Shanghai	No	Yes
2011	Drive	No	Yes
2012	Snow White and the Huntsman	No	Yes
2013	47 Ronin	No	Yes
2014	The Two Faces of January	Yes	Yes
2016	Our Kind of Traitor	No	Yes
2017	The Snowman	No	Yes
2026	Clayface	No	Yes
TBA	Ibelin	No	Yes

=== Television ===
Year	Title	Writer	Executive producer	Creator	Notes
1992	The Dying of the Light	Yes	No	No	TV movie
1996	Deep Secrets	Yes	No	No	TV movie
2018	McMafia	Yes	Yes	Yes	8 episodes
2018	The Alienist	Yes	Yes	No	3 episodes
2022	Obi-Wan Kenobi	Yes	No	No	4 episodes

== See also ==
- List of Academy Award winners and nominees from Great Britain
- List of Iranian Academy Award winners and nominees
