= Killshot (film) =

2008 film by John Madden

- Theatrical release poster
- Directed by: John Madden
- Written by: Hossein Amini
- Based on: Killshot by Elmore Leonard
- Produced by: Lawrence Bender; Richard N. Gladstein
- Starring: Diane Lane; Thomas Jane; Mickey Rourke; Joseph Gordon-Levitt; Rosario Dawson
- Cinematography: Caleb Deschanel
- Edited by: Mick Audsley; Lisa Gunning
- Music by: Klaus Badelt
- Production companies: FilmColony; Lawrence Bender Productions
- Distributed by: Third Rail Releasing; The Weinstein Company
- Release dates: November 13, 2008 (Israel); January 23, 2009 (United States)
- Running time: 95 minutes
- Country: United States
- Language: English
- Box office: $2.9 million

Killshot is a 2008 American action thriller independent film directed by John Madden, and starring Diane Lane, Thomas Jane, Mickey Rourke and Joseph Gordon-Levitt. It is based on Elmore Leonard's 1989 novel of the same name. The story follows a couple who, despite being in a Witness Protection Program, are being chased and confronted by the criminal they outed.

== Plot ==
Armand Degas, a hitman known as "Blackbird", accidentally shoots his younger brother during a job. Years later, he is hired by a Mafia boss to assassinate the man's father-in-law at a hotel. In the process, he also kills a witness. Visiting Walpole Island, Blackbird meets Lionel, a fellow First Nations member, and notices Wayne Colson, a recently fired ironworker separated from his wife Carmen.

Unable to collect his payment for the hotel murder, Blackbird learns the mafia boss wants him dead for needlessly killing the witness, a woman the mafia boss had liked. He meets Richie Nix, a reckless, volatile young criminal, and joins his scheme to extort Carmen's boss, Nelson Davies. Visiting Carmen's office to ask for a job, Wayne is mistaken for Davies by Richie and Blackbird and fends them off, throwing Richie out a window. Wayne and Carmen see Blackbird's face before he escapes with Richie, and he vows to kill them.

Blackbird recognizes Wayne from Walpole Island, where he and Richie press Lionel for Wayne's whereabouts before killing him. Staying at the home of Richie's girlfriend Donna, Blackbird and Richie arrive at the Colsons' house just as Wayne drives off. Richie takes off after him, and Carmen locks herself inside and calls the police. Richie shoots at Wayne inside a convenience store but he escapes, and Richie purposely kills the clerk. The FBI place Carmen and Wayne in Witness Protection.

Richie tricks Carmen's mother into revealing the Colsons have moved to Missouri. Carmen reconnects with Wayne in their undercover life together. Blackbird coerces the mafia boss into digging up his brother's body and burning it in a car with another corpse to fake Blackbird and Richie's deaths, buying them time as the police look for them. DNA from the body is tested against Blackbird's other incarcerated brother, proving they are related. With the FBI convinced the killers are dead, Wayne and Carmen are allowed to return home. Jealous of Donna's advances toward Blackbird, Richie shoots her dead before they leave to kill the Colsons.

After admitting to Wayne that she is not sure their marriage will survive, Carmen returns home alone, finding Richie and Blackbird waiting. Richie torments Carmen, spraying her with buck lure, forcing her to strip, and putting a bullet in her mouth, which she spits onto the floor. Losing his patience with Richie's brash behavior, Blackbird shoots him dead and allows Carmen upstairs to get dressed.

Wayne arrives and realizes Carmen is being held hostage. He retrieves his shotgun and exchanges fire with Blackbird. Wayne is hit, losing his gun. As Blackbird moves in for the killshot, he turns to see Carmen aiming Richie's gun, which he reminds her is empty, but remembers the bullet she spat out earlier. While Blackbird is distracted, Wayne grabs his shotgun, and he and Carmen shoot Blackbird at the same time. Blackbird falls dead, as Carmen and Wayne embrace.

== Cast ==
- Diane Lane as Carmen Colson
- Thomas Jane as Wayne Colson
- Mickey Rourke as Armand "The Blackbird" Degas
- Joseph Gordon-Levitt as Richie Nix
- Rosario Dawson as Donna
- Hal Holbrook as "Papa"
- Don McManus as Nelson Davies
- Aldred Wesley Montoya as Lionel
- Lois Smith as Lenore

== Production ==
=== Development and writing ===
The film adaptation of the 1989 novel Killshot by Elmore Leonard began development as early as May 1997 under Miramax Films, which had optioned Leonard's novel. After completing Pulp Fiction (1994), Quentin Tarantino and Roger Avary acquired the film rights to Leonard's novel. Tarantino initially planned to write and direct Killshot and have another director make Rum Punch, but changed his mind after re-reading Rum Punch, saying he "fell in love" with the novel all over again. By September 2004, the adaptation entered active development, with director John Madden expressing interest in helming. By January 2005, The Weinstein Company hired Madden to direct the film based on a script by Hossein Amini.

=== Casting ===
The following August, actors Diane Lane, Thomas Jane, and Mickey Rourke were cast in the lead roles. In September, actors Rosario Dawson, Joseph Gordon-Levitt, and Johnny Knoxville were cast. Actress Sandra Bullock was originally considered for the role taken by Lane, while John Travolta, Viggo Mortensen, and Justin Timberlake were originally reported to have been up for the roles taken by Rourke, Jane, and Gordon-Levitt, respectively.

=== Filming ===
Principal photography began in October 2005 in Toronto, Ontario. Filming also took place in Cape Girardeau along the Mississippi River. Production concluded by December 2005.

=== Post-production ===
By July 2006, Killshot was being screened to test audiences who had previously enjoyed Traffic and Collateral. Test screenings showed that audiences found the plot too confusing and that the story was not tightened enough. As a result, scenes involving Cape Girardeau and a subplot involving Johnny Knoxville's role as a deputy were edited from the film.

== Release ==
=== Theatrical ===
Killshot was originally slated to be released on March 17, 2006. It then was delayed to October 20, 2006.

=== Home media ===
It was reported on July 19, 2008, that Killshot would be going straight to DVD. In early September 2008, the film was resurrected for November 7, 2008, but then pushed back to January 23, 2009. The film was released on DVD on May 26, 2009, and Blu-ray on February 22, 2011.

== Reception ==
=== Critical response ===
The film received mixed reviews. As of June 2025, it holds a 38% approval rating on Rotten Tomatoes, based on eight reviews with an average rating of 4.92 out of 10.
