= Frank Muller =

American actor (1951–2008)

- Born: May 5, 1951; Netherlands
- Died: June 4, 2008 (aged 57); Durham, North Carolina, United States
- Spouse: Erika

Frank Muller (May 5, 1951 – June 4, 2008) was a stage and television actor, but was most famous as an audiobook narrator, becoming the narrator of choice for such authors as Stephen King, John le Carré, John Grisham, Elmore Leonard and many others. He suffered diffuse axonal injury from a motorcycle accident in 2001, and died of his injuries on June 4, 2008 aged 57.

== Early life ==
Muller was born in the Netherlands, the eldest of five children. His family immigrated to the United States when he was five.

== Career ==
Muller was a classically trained actor who began his career working on stage and doing commercials. He spent many years on the New York stage, where he became a company member of the Riverside Shakespeare Company, for which he played the title role in King Henry V, Edmund the Bastard in The History of King Lear, and the title role in Cyrano de Bergerac, as well as performing with the Roundabout Theater Company and the New York Shakespeare Festival among others. He also played supporting roles on television in shows like Law & Order, Life Goes On, Harry and the Hendersons, and All My Children.

It is as an audiobook narrator, however, that he was most famous. In 1979, Henry Trentman founded Recorded Books and hired Muller as its first narrator to record its first book, The Sea Wolf by Jack London. The company began by publishing audiobook recordings of public domain works such as Call of the Wild and A Tale of Two Cities but later expanded into copyrighted works as audiobooks began to grow in popularity. Muller soon became the narrator of choice for such authors as Stephen King, John le Carré, John Grisham, Elmore Leonard and many others. Muller won the 2002 and 2003 Audie Award for Best Male Narrator for his readings of Clive Barker's Coldheart Canyon and Elmore Leonard's Tishomingo Blues, respectively.

== Motorcycle accident ==
On November 5, 2001, Muller was about to leave on a week-long motorcycle trip with a close relative when his wife Erika surprised him with the news that she was expecting their second child. After celebrating, Muller left on the trip. Two hours into the trip, he lost control of his motorcycle on the freeway when he accidentally clipped a construction barrel and was sent skidding into a median barrier at about 65 miles per hour (105 km/h). Muller was thrown from the bike landing on his head on the concrete. He sustained multiple fractures, lacerations, and abrasions, and was taken to Antelope Valley Hospital Medical Center in Lancaster, California, and went into cardiac arrest three times. He also suffered severe head trauma, which was subsequently diagnosed as diffuse axonal injury.

Muller remained hospitalized for six and a half years and died on June 4, 2008, at Duke University Hospital in Durham, North Carolina.

In 2002, Stephen King, who had also experienced a life-threatening auto accident, organized a benefit for Muller with Pat Conroy, John Grisham, and Peter Straub. King went on to help found The Wavedancer Foundation, an organization dedicated to helping "mid-list writers, audio readers, and freelancers in the book and publishing industry." In the afterword of The Dark Tower V: Wolves of the Calla, King thanked Muller for his audiobooks of the first four The Dark Tower series, which he re-read before writing the final three books in that series.

== Personal life ==
Muller was married to Erika Muller and had two children. In 2003, the Mullers moved to a house outside Raleigh, North Carolina, United States, that was modified specifically for Frank's therapeutic and rehabilitative needs

He died on June 4, 2008, at Duke University Medical Center.
