= Split Image =

Split Image may refer to:

- Split-image focusing screen
- Split Image (album), a 1987 album by Excel
- Split Image (film), a 1982 film starring James Woods
- Split Image (novel), a 2010 crime novel by Robert B. Parker
- Split Image: The Life of Anthony Perkins, a 1996 biography by Charles Winecoff
- Split Images, a 1981 crime novel by Elmore Leonard
- Split image, an underwater photography composition that includes roughly half above the surface and half underwater
