= Out of Sight =

1998 film by Steven Soderbergh

- Theatrical release poster
- Directed by: Steven Soderbergh
- Screenplay by: Scott Frank
- Based on: Out of Sight by Elmore Leonard
- Produced by: Danny DeVito; Michael Shamberg; Stacey Sher
- Starring: George Clooney; Jennifer Lopez; Ving Rhames; Don Cheadle; Dennis Farina; Albert Brooks
- Cinematography: Elliot Davis
- Edited by: Anne V. Coates
- Music by: David Holmes
- Production company: Jersey Films
- Distributed by: Universal Pictures
- Release date: June 26, 1998
- Running time: 123 minutes
- Country: United States
- Language: English
- Budget: $48 million
- Box office: $77.7 million

Out of Sight is a 1998 American crime comedy film directed by Steven Soderbergh and written by Scott Frank, adapted from Elmore Leonard's 1996 novel. The first of several collaborations between Soderbergh and actor George Clooney, it was released by Universal Pictures on June 26, 1998.

The film stars Clooney and Jennifer Lopez, co-starring Ving Rhames, Don Cheadle, Dennis Farina, Nancy Allen, Steve Zahn, Catherine Keener, and Albert Brooks. There are also special appearances by Michael Keaton, briefly reprising his role as Ray Nicolette from Quentin Tarantino's Jackie Brown the previous year, and Samuel L. Jackson.

The film received Academy Award nominations for Best Adapted Screenplay and Best Film Editing. It won the Edgar Award for Best Screenplay and the National Society of Film Critics awards for Best Film, Best Director, and Best Screenplay. The film led to a short-lived spin-off television series in 2003 titled Karen Sisco starring Carla Gugino, who would reprise her role from the series in a 2012 third season episode of Justified. Paul Calderón reprised his role as Raymond Cruz from the film in the 2023 sequel miniseries Justified: City Primeval.

== Plot ==
The movie intercuts between flashbacks and the present day. This plot summary follows the true chronology.

Career bank robber Jack Foley is incarcerated at Lompoc Penitentiary in California along with his friend and accomplice Buddy, after Buddy's sister snitches on them before a heist. While at Lompoc, Foley meets petty criminal Glenn and Richard Ripley, a wealthy white collar criminal from Detroit. Foley saves Ripley from being extorted by boxer Maurice "Snoopy" Miller, leading Ripley to promise Foley a job on the outside. He also brags about a cache of uncut diamonds hidden at his home.

After his release, Foley turns up at Ripley's office but is only offered a menial security guard position. To complain, he confronts Ripley, who only expresses disdain for Foley's criminal past and throws him out of the building. While walking away, Foley notices a bank across the street, fails to rob it, and is sent to Glades Correctional Institution in Florida.

At Glades, he deduces that fellow inmate Chino is orchestrating a breakout and plans to tag along. Foley calls his ex-wife Adele, an out-of-work magician's assistant, to notify Buddy and Glenn to assist. However, on the night of the breakout, U.S. Marshal Karen Sisco arrives at the prison at the same time as Buddy, spots the men tunneling outside, and alerts the guards. In the confusion, Foley exits the tunnel in a guard's uniform and overpowers her. The men steal her car, and Foley forces her to hide with him in the trunk while Buddy drives. In the trunk, Foley and Sisco start talking to one another. They later meet Glenn to switch cars. Sisco recognizes him from a previous prisoner transport job and convinces him to drive off with her to avoid being arrested again for assisting a fugitive. He soon panics, crashes the car and flees, and Sisco is taken to the hospital. Foley and Buddy make their own way to Miami.

Sisco has a dream where she tracks down Foley, but instead of arresting him she has sex with him. After the dream, Sisco is determined to join the task force hunting for Foley and the other fugitives. Independently, she questions Adele, and happens to arrest Chino who arrives at her apartment seeking revenge on Foley. This earns her a place on the task force, but the lead agent forces her to wait in the lobby while they raid Buddy's hotel room. She and Foley spot each other as he and Buddy are in an elevator en route to the basement garage from which they escape. While in the elevator, Foley waves at Sisco, who lets them go without alerting the other agents.

The men head to Detroit, planning to break into Ripley's house and steal the hidden uncut diamonds. However, Miller is already putting his own burglary team together: his brother-in-law Kenneth, henchman White Boy Bob, and a reluctant Glenn, whom Miller first forces to help kill a rival drug dealer. Foley and Buddy meet with Miller and agree to team up on the robbery. Meanwhile, Sisco, on their trail, questions Miller's wife Moselle, and defends herself when Kenneth attempts to assault her. Foley surprises Sisco at her hotel's bar, and they spend a romantic night together.

Glenn gets cold feet and runs into Sisco, who lets him escape and continues to tail Foley. The thieves break into Ripley's mansion, threaten his housekeeper Midge, and struggle to shoot open the safe upstairs. Meanwhile, Foley and Buddy find Ripley hiding in his study, where Foley deduces that the diamonds (which look like small, nondescript stones) are hidden in Ripley's tropical fish tank. Ripley reveals that he is in love with his maid Midge, and refuses to leave without her. He is then captured by Miller.

Unwilling to leave Midge to be raped by Miller and his associates, Foley gives Buddy the diamonds and goes back inside. He shoots Kenneth in bed, then is held at gunpoint by White Boy Bob, who trips on the stairs and accidentally shoots himself in the head. Sisco arrives and shoots Miller in self-defense. Unwilling to return to prison, Foley confronts Sisco with an empty gun, imploring her to kill him. Sisco instead shoots him in the leg and arrests him.

In the police van outside, Foley meets another detainee, Hejira Henry, who claims to have escaped from prison nine times. Realizing that Sisco arranged for them to meet and return to Glades together, Foley smiles as the van leaves for Florida.

== Cast ==
- George Clooney as Jack Foley
- Jennifer Lopez as Karen Sisco
- Ving Rhames as Buddy Bragg
- Don Cheadle as Maurice "Snoopy" Miller
- Dennis Farina as Marshall Sisco
- Albert Brooks as Richard "Dick The Ripper" Ripley
- Nancy Allen as Midge
- Catherine Keener as Adele Delisi
- Isaiah Washington as Kenneth
- Steve Zahn as Glenn Michaels
- Paul Calderón as Raymond Cruz
- Luis Guzmán as Jose "Chino" Chirino
- Viola Davis as Moselle Miller
- Paul Soileau as Aurelio "Lulu" Linares
- Wendell B. Harris Jr. as Daniel Burdon
- Connie Sawyer as Old Elevator Lady
- Keith Loneker as White Boy Bob
- Michael Keaton as Ray Nicolette (uncredited)
- Samuel L. Jackson as Hejira Henry (uncredited)

== Production ==
=== Development ===
The source novel's origins lie in a picture Leonard saw in the Detroit News of a beautiful young female federal marshal standing in front of a Miami courthouse with a shotgun resting on her hip. Producer Danny DeVito bought the rights to the book after his success with the 1995 film adaptation of Leonard's novel Get Shorty. Steven Soderbergh had made two films for Universal Pictures when executive Casey Silver offered him Out of Sight with George Clooney attached. However, the filmmaker was close to making another project and hesitated to commit. Silver told him, "These things aren't going to line up very often, you should pay attention."

=== Casting ===
Sandra Bullock was originally considered to play Karen Sisco opposite Clooney. According to Soderbergh, "What happened was I spent some time with [Clooney and Bullock] and they actually did have a great chemistry. But it was for the wrong movie. They really should do a movie together, but it was not Elmore Leonard energy."

The character of Foley appealed to Clooney, who, as a boy, had thought of movie bank robbers as heroes, citing "the Cagneys and the Bogarts, Steve McQueen and all those guys, the guys who were kind of bad and you still rooted for them. And when I read this, I thought, 'This guy is robbing a bank but you really want him to get away with it.'"

Soderbergh cites Nicolas Roeg's 1973 film Don't Look Now as the primary influence on how he approached the love scene between Foley and Sisco: "What I wanted to create in our movie was the intimacy of that, the juxtaposition of these two contrasting things ... We had to mix it up and have you feel like you were more in their heads."

Danny DeVito and Garry Shandling were considered for the part of Ripley before Albert Brooks was cast.

The character Ray Nicolette also appears in Leonard's novel Rum Punch, which was being filmed as Jackie Brown when Universal Pictures was preparing to begin production on Out of Sight. After Michael Keaton was cast as the detective Nicolette in Jackie Brown, Universal subsequently cast him for a cameo in the same role in Out of Sight. While Miramax Films owned the rights to the character because Jackie Brown went into production first, director Quentin Tarantino felt it was imperative that Miramax not charge Universal for using the character, allowing the character's appearance without Miramax receiving financial compensation. Nicolette appears in only one brief scene, whereas the character is a much more substantial element of Jackie Brown.

=== Music ===
DJ David Holmes was originally hired to write a few sections of the film's theme music. Soderbergh liked what he did so much that he had Holmes score the rest of the film. Holmes spent six weeks working 12- to 17-hour days to finish the score in time for the film's release. He drew upon several influences, including Lalo Schifrin, Quincy Jones, Dean Martin, Miles Davis, Sun Ra, and Willie Bobo.

== Release ==
Out of Sight was released on June 26, 1998, in 2,106 theaters and grossed USD 12 million on its opening weekend, ranking in fourth place behind Dr. Dolittle, Mulan and The X-Files. It went on to gross $37.5 million domestically and $40.2 million in the rest of the world for a worldwide total of $77.7 million.

== Reception ==
=== Critical response ===
Out of Sight received universal acclaim. On Rotten Tomatoes, the film has a 94% approval rating, based on 106 reviews, with an average rating of 8.1/10. The site's critical consensus reads: "Steven Soderbergh's intelligently crafted adaptation of the Elmore Leonard novel is witty, sexy, surprisingly entertaining, and a star-making turn for George Clooney." On Metacritic, the film has a score of 84 out of 100, based on 30 reviews, indicating "universal acclaim". Audiences polled by CinemaScore gave the film an average grade of "B-" on an A+ to F scale.

Film critic Roger Ebert gave the film three and a half out of four stars and praised Clooney's performance, stating: "Clooney has never been better. A lot of actors who are handsome when young need to put on some miles before the full flavor emerges ... Here Clooney at last looks like a big screen star; the good-looking leading man from television is over with." Janet Maslin of The New York Times praised Lopez's performance, writing, "Ms. Lopez has her best movie role thus far, and she brings it both seductiveness and grit; if it was hard to imagine a hard-working, pistol-packing bombshell on the page, it couldn't be easier here." Andrew Sarris, in his review for The New York Observer, wrote, "For once in a mainstream production, the narrative machinery works on all cylinders without any wasted motion or fatuous rhetoric. They don't make movies like this anymore, in this overcalculated and overtested era." In his review for the Los Angeles Times, Kenneth Turan wrote, "As always with the best of Leonard, it's the journey, not the destination, that counts, and director Soderbergh has let it unfold with dry wit and great skill. Making adroit use of complex flashbacks, freeze frames and other stylistic flourishes, he's managed to put his personal stamp on the film while staying faithful to the irreplaceable spirit of the original."

Entertainment Weekly gave the film a "B+" rating and Owen Gleiberman wrote, "This is Clooney's wiliest, most complex star turn yet. It helps that he's lost the Beverly Hills Caesar cut (he's actually more handsome with his hair swept back), and his performance is slyly two-tiered: Foley is all charming moxie on the surface, a bit clueless underneath." Richard Schickel, in his review for Time, wrote, "What makes this movie work is the kind of cool that made Get Shorty go so nicely: an understanding that life's little adventures rarely come in neat three-act packages, the way most movies now do, and the unruffled presentation of outrageously twisted dialogue, characters and situations as if they were the most natural things in the world." In her review for the L.A. Weekly, Manohla Dargis wrote, "This isn't a profound film, or even an important one, but then it isn't trying to be; it's so diverting and so full of small, satisfying pleasures, you don't realize how good it is until after it's over."

=== Accolades ===
| Award | Category | Recipient(s) | Result |
|---|---|---|---|
| Academy Awards | Best Screenplay – Based on Material Previously Produced or Published | Scott Frank | Nominated |
| Academy Awards | Best Film Editing | Anne V. Coates | Nominated |
| ALMA Awards | Outstanding Actress in a Feature Film in a Crossover Role | Jennifer Lopez | Nominated |
| American Cinema Editors Awards | Best Edited Feature Film | Anne V. Coates | Nominated |
| Artios Awards | Best Casting for Feature Film – Drama | Francine Maisler | Nominated |
| Awards Circuit Community Awards | Best Adapted Screenplay | Scott Frank | Nominated |
| Boston Society of Film Critics Awards | Best Film | | Won |
| Boston Society of Film Critics Awards | Best Director | Steven Soderbergh | 2nd Place |
| Boston Society of Film Critics Awards | Best Actor | George Clooney | 2nd Place |
| Boston Society of Film Critics Awards | Best Screenplay | Scott Frank | Won |
| Critics' Choice Movie Awards | Best Picture | | Nominated |
| Dallas–Fort Worth Film Critics Association Awards | Best Picture | | Nominated |
| Edgar Allan Poe Awards | Best Motion Picture Screenplay | Scott Frank (screenplay); Elmore Leonard (novel) | Won |
| Empire Awards | Best Actress | Jennifer Lopez | Nominated |
| Golden Trailer Awards | Best Music | | Won |
| MTV Movie Awards | Best Female Performance | Jennifer Lopez | Nominated |
| MTV Movie Awards | Best Kiss | George Clooney and Jennifer Lopez | Nominated |
| National Society of Film Critics Awards | Best Film | | Won |
| National Society of Film Critics Awards | Best Director | Steven Soderbergh | Won |
| National Society of Film Critics Awards | Best Screenplay | Scott Frank | Won |
| New York Latin ACE Awards | Best Actress | Jennifer Lopez | Nominated |
| Online Film & Television Association Awards | Best Screenplay – Based on Material from Another Medium | Scott Frank | Won |
| Online Film Critics Society Awards | Best Adapted Screenplay | Scott Frank | Won |
| Online Film Critics Society Awards | Best Editing | Anne V. Coates | Nominated |
| Southeastern Film Critics Association Awards | Best Picture | | 8th Place |
| Southeastern Film Critics Association Awards | Best Adapted Screenplay | Scott Frank | Won |
| Toronto Film Critics Association Awards | Best Director | Steven Soderbergh | Runner-up |
| Turkish Film Critics Association Awards | Best Foreign Film | | 4th Place |
| Writers Guild of America Awards | Best Screenplay – Based on Material Previously Produced or Published | Scott Frank | Won |

American Film Institute Lists

- AFI's 100 Years...100 Thrills – Nominated
- AFI's 10 Top 10 – Nominated Gangster Film

Other Honors

- Entertainment Weekly voted it as the sexiest film ever on their "50 Sexiest Movies Ever" poll and ranked it #9 on their Top 25 Modern Romances list.
- In 2012, the Motion Picture Editors Guild listed Out of Sight as the 52nd best-edited film of all time based on a survey of its membership.

=== Impact and legacy ===
In later years, Soderbergh would see the film as "a very conscious decision on my part to try and climb my way out of the arthouse ghetto which can be as much of a trap as making blockbuster films." He had just turned down directing Human Nature, written by Charlie Kaufman, to direct Out of Sight. "And I was very aware that at that point in my career, half the business was off limits to me." Clooney said, "Out of Sight was the first time where I had a say, and it was the first good screenplay that I'd read where I just went, 'That's it.' And even though it didn't do really well box office-wise - we sort of tanked again - it was a really good film." Lopez said: "It kind of became a cult classic. It didn't get as much notice when it first came out at the box office but now, years later, so many people told me that was their favorite film. It's crazy."

== See also ==
- Heist film
