= The Hot Kid =

2005 novel by Elmore Leonard

- Author: Elmore Leonard
- Language: English
- Genre: Thriller, Novel
- Publisher: William Morrow, Phoenix, HarperTorch
- Publication date: May 10, 2005
- Publication place: United States
- Media type: Print (hardback & paperback)
- ISBN: 0-06-072422-6
- Preceded by: Cuba Libre
- Followed by: Up In Honey's Room

"The Hot Kid" by Elmore Leonard (book cover)

The Hot Kid is a 2005 novel by Elmore Leonard.

== Plot summary ==
This fictional story is set during The Great Depression and follows the career of Carl (Carlos) Webster, a crack shot, well respected, and mannerful lawman who killed his first criminal, aged 15. The reader follows Carlos' career and his conflict with Jack Belmont, an ambitious criminal who wants to become public enemy number one. The story follows other characters like Louly Brown, a woman who loves Carlos, but wants to be known as Pretty Boy Floyd's gal. There's also writer Tony Antonelli, of True Detective magazine.

Carl Webster is presented as the son of Virgil Webster, introduced in Leonard's 1998 novel Cuba Libre. Both men reappear in Leonard's 2007 novel Up In Honey's Room.

Real life contemporary bank robbers who make an appearance in the novel include Bonnie and Clyde, Pretty Boy Floyd, Machine Gun Kelly, John Dillinger and Baby Face Nelson

== Reception ==
Janet Maslin of The New York Times described the book as 'far from being an exercise in nostalgia, this book reinvigorates what Mr. Leonard might have experienced at his most impressionable: the mythmaking process that turned commonplace crooks into figures of folklore'
