= Road Dogs =

Road Dogs (and variants) may refer to:

- Road Dogs (novel), a 2009 novel by Elmore Leonard
- Road Dogs (John Mayall album), 2005
- Road Dogs (Charlie Daniels album), 2000
- Roadog, a large custom motorcycle, built by William "Wild Bill" Gelbke
- Road Dogg, the best-known ring name of American professional wrestler Brian Girard James
- Road Dog, a wardriving homebrew application for the Sony PSP
