= Glitz (novel) =

1985 novel by Elmore Leonard

- Author: Elmore Leonard
- Language: English
- Publisher: Arbor House
- Publication date: 1985
- Publication place: United States
- Media type: Hardcover
- Pages: 251
- ISBN: 0-688-16095-6

Glitz is a 1985 novel by author Elmore Leonard, following the story of Detective Vincent Mora who is being stalked by Teddy Magyk, the serial rapist he put away. It was made into a 1988 television film starring Jimmy Smits and Markie Post.

== Critical reception ==
Writing in The New York Times in 1985, horror fiction writer Stephen King compared the novel favorably with works by John D. MacDonald, Raymond Chandler and Dashiell Hammett.

== Film ==
In the 1988 film version for cable television, the Atlantic City detective Vincent Mora was played by Jimmy Smits, the villain Teddy Magyk by John Diehl and the lounge singer Linda Moon by Markie Post. It was directed by Sandor Stern.
