= A Coyote's in the House =

2004 novel by Elmore Leonard

- First edition
- Author: Elmore Leonard
- Language: English
- Genre: Children's novel
- Published: 2004 (HarperEntertainment)
- Publication place: United States
- Media type: Print (hardback)
- Pages: 160 pp
- ISBN: 0-06-054404-X
- OCLC: 53992947
- Dewey Decimal: 813/.54 22
- LC Class: PS3562.E55 C69 2004

A Coyote's in the House is a 2004 novel written by Elmore Leonard. The book was Leonard's only novel for children.

The novel features references to an earlier novel by Leonard, Get Shorty, specifically to Harry Zimm and his production studio.

== Plot summary ==
An aging movie-star dog wants to trade places with a hip coyote.
