= The Switch (novel) =

1978 book

- Author: Elmore Leonard
- Language: English
- Genre: Crime novel
- Publisher: Bantam Books
- Publication date: January 1, 1978
- Publication place: United States
- Media type: Print (paperback)
- Pages: 216
- ISBN: 9780553118858

The Switch is a 1978 crime novel by American author Elmore Leonard. It marks the first appearance of the criminals Ordell Robbie and Louis Gara, who later reappear in Leonard's 1992 novel Rum Punch.

The novel received an Edgar Award nomination for Best Paperback Original in 1979.

It was adapted into the black‑comedy crime film Life of Crime, which premiered at the 2013 Toronto International Film Festival.

== Plot ==
Ordell Robbie and Louis Gara, two small-time ex-convicts, plot to kidnap Mickey Dawson, the wife of Detroit real-estate developer Frank Dawson, for ransom. They abduct her while Frank is on a trip to the Bahamas and demand $1 million from him.

Frank refuses to cooperate, and the criminals discover that he filed for divorce shortly before the kidnapping in order to marry 21-year-old Melanie Ralston, who is with him in the Bahamas.

As their scheme unravels, Mickey grows to enjoy her captivity and conspires with Ordell and Louis to con her husband out of his fortune.

== Editions ==
The Switch was first published on January 1, 1978, by Bantam Books. It was reissued in December 2004 by Orion Publishing Co. In June 2025, it appeared in Penguin’s Modern Classics – Crime & Espionage series.
