= Hombre (novel) =

1961 Western novel by Elmore Leonard

- First edition
- Author: Elmore Leonard
- Publisher: Ballantine Books
- Publication date: 1961

Hombre is a novel by American author Elmore Leonard, published in 1961. It was adapted into a film in 1967 with the same name starring Paul Newman. It tells the story of an Apache man, John Russell, who leads the passengers of an attacked stagecoach through the desert to safety.

The novel was critically acclaimed upon release, and continues to be regarded to the modern day as a classic of the western genre. It was released as a film six years after its publication.
