= Life of Crime (film) =

2013 film by Daniel Schechter

- Theatrical release poster
- Directed by: Daniel Schechter
- Written by: Daniel Schechter
- Based on: The Switch by Elmore Leonard
- Produced by: Michael Siegel; Elizabeth Destro; Ellen Goldsmith-Vein; Jordan Kessler; Lee Stollman; Ashok Amritraj
- Starring: Jennifer Aniston; Yasiin Bey; Isla Fisher; Will Forte; Mark Boone Junior; Tim Robbins; John Hawkes
- Cinematography: Eric Alan Edwards
- Edited by: Daniel Schechter
- Music by: The Newton Brothers; Jordan Galland
- Production companies: Hyde Park Entertainment; Image Nation Abu Dhabi; The Gotham Group; StarStream Entertainment; Abbolita Productions
- Distributed by: Lionsgate; Roadside Attractions
- Release dates: September 15, 2013 (TIFF); August 29, 2014 (United States)
- Running time: 99 minutes
- Country: United States
- Language: English
- Budget: $12 million
- Box office: $1.5 million

Life of Crime is a 2013 American black comedy crime film written and directed by Daniel Schechter, based on Elmore Leonard's novel The Switch (1978), which includes characters later revisited in his novel Rum Punch (1992), which was adapted into the Quentin Tarantino film Jackie Brown (1997). Life of Crime was screened on the closing night of the 2013 Toronto International Film Festival, on the opening day of the Abu Dhabi Film Festival, at the 2014 Traverse City Film Festival and released in theaters on August 29, 2014 by Lionsgate and Roadside Attractions.

== Plot ==
As the movie opens in late-1970's Detroit, Louis and his friend Ordell lure the man who just robbed Louis of 27 dollars into the street to run him over and recover the cash. The two plan to kidnap Mickey, wife of corrupt real estate developer Frank Dawson, and ransom her for $1 million, knowing Frank must avoid police involvement or risk exposure of his real estate crimes. Louis recognizes Mickey from a distance as she takes her son Bo to play tennis at the country club, and accidentally encounters her face-to-face. Mickey rebuffs the adulterous advances of Marshall Taylor, a married man who does some work for Frank.

With Frank and Bo both out-of-town, Ordell and Louis arrive masked at the Dawson house and take Mickey by surprise in the kitchen. Marshall turns up unexpectedly and Ordell and Louis subdue him and lock him in a closet, before departing with Mickey. They take her to the house of Nazi admirer Richard, where she is locked in a room and kept blindfolded to protect her captors' identities. Louis bandages her foot caringly and conscientiously from a cut sustained during the kidnapping.

Meanwhile, Frank and his mistress Melanie enjoy themselves at the Dawsons' apartment in Freeport, Bahamas. Ordell calls Frank, establishes the credibility of the kidnapping with Mickey's voice, and demands the ransom. The kidnappers are surprised by Frank's lack of concern, unaware (as is Mickey) that he has already sent Mickey divorce papers and is planning to marry Melanie, and Mickey's murder would thus save him both ransom and years of spousal support. Louis exposes Frank's lack of concern, history of embezzlement, and adultery to Mickey who sees his face and remembers him from the country club. Melanie screens Frank's calls to prevent Ordell and Louis' attempts to reach him, and the men discuss their options as Mickey eavesdrops through vents and doors.

Marshall returns to the Dawsons' to clean up after himself and encounters Richard who he believes is a police officer, triggering an altercation that ends with Richard shooting at Marshall's car. Ordell and his friend Cedric go to Freeport and find Melanie at the pool while Frank is away. Melanie clues Ordell in on the impending divorce and proposes a deal that the kidnappers get $100,000 or more if Mickey dies. Ordell and Melanie have a romantic encounter. Intending to kill Mickey but sensing Louis' tenderness towards her, Ordell calls and instructs Richard and Louis to return Mickey to her home, secretly telling Richard to go back in and kill her afterwards.

Richard tries to rape Mickey while Louis is out stealing a car, but is interrupted by Louis' return. Louis assaults Richard and then he and Mickey flee. As Richard chases the pair, shooting at their departing car, he is hit by a police car. Richard subsequently is killed in a shootout with the police.

Later Mickey and Louis talk over marijuana and beers at his apartment before he returns her home. Upon Frank's return, Mickey confronts him about the ransom, the divorce, and Melanie. Frank denies everything, claiming he knew the kidnappers were bluffing while Mickey insists they both know the truth. Mickey visits Louis, and finds Ordell and Melanie with him and says that Frank still intends to divorce her and spend his life with Melanie. While Melanie visits to the bathroom, Mickey, Louis and Ordell hatch a new plan, and when Melanie re-emerges, all three wear masks and appear ready to kidnap Melanie for ransom.

== Cast ==
- Jennifer Aniston as Mickey Dawson
- Yasiin Bey as Ordell Robbie
- Isla Fisher as Melanie Ralston
- Will Forte as Marshall Taylor
- Mark Boone Junior as Richard Monk
- Tim Robbins as Frank Dawson
- John Hawkes as Louis Gara

== Production ==
Dennis Quaid was originally cast as Frank Dawson, Mickey's husband.

Principal photography lasted 26 days. The major portion of the film was shot in Greenwich, Connecticut. Tod A. Maitland did the sound mixing.

== Reception ==
Life of Crime received generally positive reviews from critics. On the review aggregator website Rotten Tomatoes, 68% of 81 critics' reviews are positive, with an average rating of 5.8/10. The website's consensus reads: "It may not stand shoulder-to-shoulder with the best Elmore Leonard adaptations, but Life of Crime has enough ambling charm—and a sharp enough cast—to get by." Metacritic, which uses a weighted average, assigned the film a score of 60 out of 100, based on 28 critics, indicating "mixed or average" reviews.

Catherine Shoard of The Guardian praised Schecter for his "unexpectedly winning take" on Leonard's novel and the "top-notch" performances from the cast, highlighting Aniston for her "deft comic timing" and Hawkes for being "surprisingly convincing" in his role, concluding that: "This is a good-natured, show-not-tell treat, almost bloodless fun." Glenn Kenny of RogerEbert.com called it "a pretty engaging, and [pretty] authentically Leonardesque, comedic crime movie" and praised the ensemble cast's performances, singling out Aniston's part for being "measured, engrossing, and empathy-generating" without any "sitcom-style" mannerisms, concluding that: "The amusing twists and turns of the script, the multiple instances of bracing humor and consistent tension, help the cast bring this small-scale thriller to the place it clearly wants to be. Well worth seeing, particularly for Leonard people." Ben Kenigsberg of The New York Times wrote that it pales in comparison to Jackie Brown and found Bey to be "droll" as Ordell Robbie, but called it a "late-summer caper movie" that settles into its groove and offers an "intriguing contrast of actors and a director taking a different approach to known material."

Michael O'Sullivan of The Washington Post commended Hawkes and Bey for doing "an adequate job" portraying their characters but felt the story they inhabit was "noticeably sluggish and spiritless" compared to Tarantino's film, and lacked a sense of urgency in its overall setup. Steve Macfarlane of Slant Magazine criticized Schecter for crafting his film with "obnoxiously self-aware period detail" and a "too-rich soundtrack" when compared to American Hustle and felt the performances had an "undeniably comparable dramatic weightlessness" to them, highlighting Aniston for being miscast in her role and giving "a long, bland starring performance in an Indiewood dramedy." Entertainment Weekly's Chris Nashawaty gave the movie a "C−" grade, calling it one of the worst Leonard adaptations based on Schecter's "lifeless" filmmaking, and backhandedly complimenting its "kitschy" production for distracting viewers away from the rest of the film.
