= 52 Pick-Up =

1986 film

- Theatrical release poster
- Directed by: John Frankenheimer
- Screenplay by: John Steppling; Elmore Leonard
- Based on: 52 Pickup by Elmore Leonard
- Produced by: Yoram Globus; Menahem Golan
- Starring: Roy Scheider; Ann-Margret; Vanity; John Glover; Clarence Williams III
- Cinematography: Jost Vacano
- Edited by: Robert F. Shugrue
- Music by: Gary Chang
- Production company: Cannon Films
- Distributed by: Cannon Group
- Release date: November 7, 1986
- Running time: 110 minutes
- Country: United States
- Language: English
- Budget: $8 million
- Box office: $5.2 million

52 Pick-Up is a 1986 American neo-noir crime film directed by John Frankenheimer and starring Roy Scheider, Ann-Margret, and Vanity. It is based on Elmore Leonard's 1974 novel 52 Pickup and is the second adaptation of it after The Ambassador (1984).

== Plot ==
Harry Mitchell is a successful construction magnate living in Los Angeles, whose wife Barbara is running for city council. One day, Harry is confronted by three hooded blackmailers who demand $105,000 per year for a videotape of him and his mistress, a young nude model named Cini. Because of his wife's political aspirations, he cannot go to the police; however, guilt eventually drives him to confess, and she kicks him out of their bedroom.

Harry initially refuses to cave to the blackmailers' demands. Alan Raimy, the lead blackmailer, breaks into Harry's house, stealing his handgun and some of his clothing. Later, the trio kidnap Harry and force him to watch a video of Cini being murdered with his stolen gun. They demand $105,000 a year for the rest of Harry's life in exchange for their silence. Harry, however, vows to get revenge.

Using deduction and his business contacts, Harry tracks down and confronts Raimy, having learned he is the leader of the blackmailers and an amateur adult filmmaker. Knowing he has a background in accounting, Harry shows Raimy his financial records, which indicate that the majority of his wealth is illiquid, making him unable to afford the ransom. Harry offers Raimy $52,000 in cash as an initial payment instead, which Raimy accepts.

Through Doreen, a colleague and friend of Cini, Harry learns the names of the other blackmailers, the sociopathic Bobby Shy and the cowardly Leo. He first makes Raimy suspicious by suggesting Leo gave up his name; Bobby, realizing the truth, violently interrogates Doreen, who manages to convince Bobby she did not tell Harry anything. That night, Bobby breaks into the Mitchell house and tries to kill Harry, but Harry and Barbara overpower him. Harry realizes Raimy did not tell his accomplices about the $52,000 offer, and reveals it to Bobby before allowing him to leave. Afterwards, Bobby angrily confronts Raimy and demands half the money Harry offered.

Leo, cracking under the pressure, confesses everything to Harry, saying he never wanted to hurt Cini and that both her body and the videotape have been disposed of. He also warns that Raimy and Bobby intend to kill him and Barbara after the payment is made. Bobby later confronts Leo, who is planning to leave town with his lover, and kills them both. Meanwhile, Raimy kidnaps Barbara as collateral, drugging and raping her in a motel. He then lures Bobby and Doreen to a warehouse and kills both of them before going to meet Harry, who has agreed to exchange the money for Barbara's return.

At the exchange, Harry warns Raimy that if anything happens to them, his lawyer will send Raimy's fingerprints (from the financial records) to the police. Raimy has previously expressed interest in Harry’s sports car, a '65 Jaguar E-Type OTS, so Harry offers it as part of the exchange. Unknown to Raimy, the car has been rigged with a bomb. When Raimy starts the car, the doors lock, trapping him inside before the bomb explodes, killing him, as Harry and Barbara walk away.

== Cast ==
- Roy Scheider as Harry Mitchell
- Ann-Margret as Barbara Mitchell
- Vanity as Doreen
- John Glover as Alan Raimy
- Clarence Williams III as Robert Lee "Bobby" Shy
- Lonny Chapman as Jim O'Boyle
- Kelly Preston as Cynthia "Cini" Frazier
- Robert Trebor as Leo Franks
- Doug McClure as Mark Arveson
- Tom Byron as Party Goer
- Randy West as Party Goer
- Ron Jeremy Hyatt as Party Goer
- Amber Lynn as Party Goer
- Sharon Mitchell as Party Goer
- Jamie Gillis as Party Goer

== Production ==
Tomorrow Entertainment first acquired the rights to Elmore Leonard's novel 52 Pickup in 1982 and planned to begin filming an adaptation on January 1, 1983. However, the film was placed in turnaround and eventually acquired by The Cannon Group, Inc. in 1984, whose co-chairmen Menahem Golan and Yoram Globus changed the setting from Detroit to Tel Aviv and the identity of the blackmail victims to the family of the U.S. Ambassador to Israel. This version of the film, The Ambassador, was released in 1984. After John Frankenheimer read the book, he obtained permission from Golan and Globus to direct a more faithful adaptation. Filming was originally going to begin on April 9, 1986, in Pittsburgh, which was meant to stand in for the novel's original setting of Detroit. However, the filming and setting was moved to Los Angeles in order to save budgetary costs. The Mitchells' home was filmed in Hancock Park, while other scenes were filmed in Vine Street and Santa Monica Boulevard.

== Release ==
52 Pick-Up opened in New York and Los Angeles on 7 November 1986. The film was distributed by the Cannon Group. It debuted poorly at the box office.

== Reception ==
Roger Ebert, writing in the Chicago Sun-Times, claimed it "provides us with the best, most reprehensible villain of the year and uses his vile charm as the starting point for a surprisingly good film. ... This is a well-crafted movie by a man who knows how to hook the audience with his story; it's Frankenheimer's best work in years." The New York Times film critic Janet Maslin described it as "fast-paced, lurid, exploitative and loaded with malevolent energy. John Frankenheimer, who directed, hasn't done anything this darkly entertaining since Black Sunday." Tom Milne (Monthly Film Bulletin) described the film as "enjoyable, up to a point, as anything Frankenheimer has done in recent years." while noting that the weakness in the film was that "the protagonist and his wife are much too sketchily realised"

On Rotten Tomatoes the film has an approval rating of 58% based on reviews from 19 critics.
