= Out of Sight (novel) =

1996 novel by Elmore Leonard

- First edition (publ. Delacorte Press)
- Author: Elmore Leonard
- Language: English
- Publication date: 1996

Out of Sight is a 1996 crime fiction novel by Elmore Leonard.

== Plot ==
Jack Foley, a "gentleman bank robber," arranges a break-out from a Florida jail. The plan is interrupted by shotgun-toting Federal Marshal Karen Sisco. The pair end up in the trunk of the getaway car, where they find they have a mutual interest: classic Hollywood movies.

== Film adaptation ==
The novel was adapted to a 1998 movie of the same name directed by Steven Soderbergh, starring George Clooney as Foley and Jennifer Lopez as Sisco. In 2003–04, an ABC-TV series followed, Karen Sisco, starring Carla Gugino as Sisco.

Foley's character returned in Leonard's 2009 novel, Road Dogs.
