= Djibouti (novel) =

2010 novel by Elmore Leonard

- First edition (publ. William Morrow)
- Author: Elmore Leonard
- Publisher: William Morrow
- Publication date: October 12, 2010
- ISBN: 978-0-061-73517-2

Djibouti is a 2010 crime fiction work by American writer Elmore Leonard.

== Plot ==
In the novel, Dara Barr is an "Oscar-winning documentary film maker" and her "6 feet 6, age 72, African American, über-cool" confidant and assistant Xavier LeBo arrive in Djibouti to document piracy around the Horn of Africa.

== Critical reception ==
Writing in The Guardian, Giles Foden described the subject matter of the book as "well researched and not as improbable as it might seem."

Writing in The Independent, Barry Forshaw noted that the fictional young filmmaker and her older adviser might resemble the production of Katherine Bigelow's 2008 film The Hurt Locker.
