= Three-Ten to Yuma =

1953 short story

- Short story by Elmore Leonard
- Cover of Three-Ten to Yuma and Other Stories
- Country: United States
- Language: English
- Genre: Short story

Publication
- Published in: Dime Western Magazine
- Publication date: March 1953

"Three-Ten to Yuma" is a short story written by Elmore Leonard that was first published in Dime Western Magazine, a 1950s pulp magazine, in March 1953. It is one of the few Western stories to have been adapted to the screen twice, in 1957 and in 2007.

== Plot summary ==
Paul Scallen, a deputy marshal, is escorting train robber and wanted fugitive Jimmy Kidd to Tucson to stand trial. The two travel to a small town called Contention, where they prepare to catch a train to Yuma later in the afternoon. The two hole up in a hotel room close to the train station with the help of Mr. Timpey, a representative of Wells Fargo sent to ensure Kidd is brought to justice for stealing the bank's money.

Scallen and Kidd wait in the hotel room and spend the next few hours discussing Scallen's pay and motivations. Scallen sees several men waiting outside, who are revealed by Kidd to be his gang, who have been tracking them in secret. Their leader, Kidd's loyal second-in-command Charlie Prince, asks after Kidd, who assures Charlie that he will soon be released and urges Scallen to do so to avoid bloodshed. Scallen refuses and the two continue to wait for the train. Mr. Timpey returns, along with another man named Moons, who is intent on killing Kidd for a crime he was acquitted of in a previous trial. After a brief scuffle in which Scallen incapacitates Moons before he can shoot Kidd, the two leave the hotel room in order to catch the arriving train to Yuma. After reaching the train station, Scallen finds himself surrounded by Charlie’s men, and after a brief exchange, a gunfight ensues in which Kidd attempts to crawl away while Scallen shoots Charlie and another gang member died. Scallen makes a break for the train, pulling Kidd onto the car with him. Safely inside the train car, the two agree that Scallen has earned his money.

== Adaptations ==
The written story is the kernel from which the two films grew, and the source of some dialogue in each film. The names of most characters in the movies differ from those in the story, save that of Charlie Prince, a character in each version.

== Anthologies ==
The story is collected in The Complete Western Stories of Elmore Leonard as well as in the selection of Leonard's stories titled Three-Ten to Yuma and Other Stories.
