= Hombre (film) =

1967 film by Martin Ritt

- Theatrical release poster
- Directed by: Martin Ritt
- Screenplay by: Irving Ravetch; Harriet Frank Jr.
- Based on: Hombre (1961 novel) by Elmore Leonard
- Produced by: Irving Ravetch; Martin Ritt
- Starring: Paul Newman; Fredric March; Richard Boone; Diane Cilento; Cameron Mitchell; Barbara Rush; Martin Balsam
- Cinematography: James Wong Howe
- Edited by: Frank Bracht
- Music by: David Rose
- Production company: Hombre Productions
- Distributed by: 20th Century Fox
- Release date: March 21, 1967
- Running time: 111 minutes
- Country: United States
- Language: English
- Budget: $5.9 million
- Box office: $12.0 million

Hombre (Spanish for 'man') is a 1967 American revisionist Western film directed and produced by Martin Ritt, based on the 1961 novel by Elmore Leonard. It stars Paul Newman, Fredric March, Richard Boone, Diane Cilento, Cameron Mitchell, Barbara Rush and Martin Balsam.

Newman's amount of dialogue in the film is minimal and much of the role is conveyed through mannerism and action. This was the sixth and final time Ritt directed Newman; they had previously worked together on The Long, Hot Summer; Paris Blues; Hemingway's Adventures of a Young Man; Hud; and The Outrage.

The film was released by 20th Century Fox on March 21, 1967, and was both a critical and commercial success.

== Plot ==
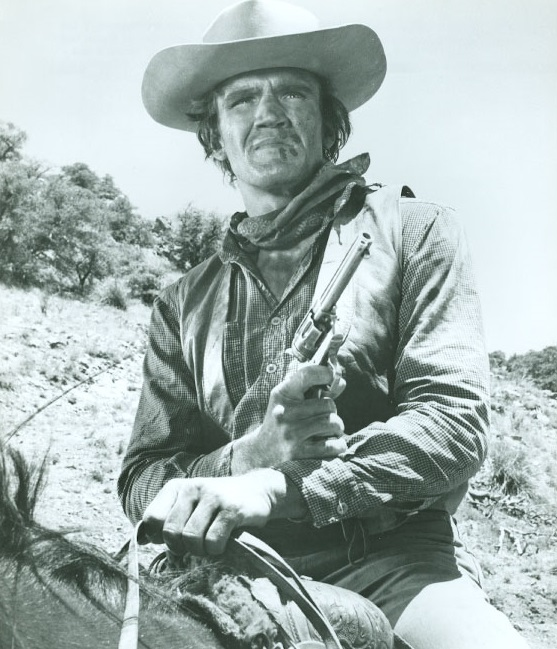
David Canary as Lamar Dean in Hombre

A rider approaches an Apache-raised white man, John Russell, with a request from his boss to come into town. When John arrives, Mendez (a stagecoach driver) informs him that his adoptive father has died, leaving him a boarding house in a nearby town. Mendez encourages him to return to the "white world;" meanwhile, two cowboys harass John's Apache companions and John smashes a glass in the face of one cowboy before leaving.

In town, John informs the boarding house manager Jessie that he intends to sell the house. Upstairs, the messenger Billy Lee Blake and his young wife Doris argue about the disappointing life they have in the small town. Jessie tells her boyfriend, the sheriff, Frank, that she is losing the house and asks him to consider marrying her. When he refuses, she leaves.

At the stagecoach station, a rich woman and her husband offer an exorbitant price to run the stage, which was recently closed by the company for slow business. Billy Lee offers to drive them, and convinces Mendez that they can manage the trip. That night, John, Jessie, Billy Lee and his harpy wife Doris, Dr. and Mrs. Favor (the rich couple) and a soldier are awaiting the stage. A man named Grimes demands John's ticket, and when the soldier tells him to leave John alone, Grimes turns his attention to the soldier, and threatens him into giving up the ticket to him. John does nothing to support the soldier, which Jessie calls him out on.

During the ride, John reveals he worked for the reservation police, after this the doctor asks Mendez to have John ride outside the stage with him.

The next day the stage is robbed by a gang consisting of the two cowboys from the bar, joined by the sheriff, a Mexican and Grimes, who knew that Dr. Favor (the territorial Indian Agent) was transporting $12,000 he embezzled from federal funds meant to buy food for the starving Apaches that John lived with. They take the money and Mrs. Favor as a hostage, but John manages to kill one of the cowboys and the sheriff with a hidden rifle and recovers the money. The group flee into the mountains behind John, who takes the money from Favor. The Mexican from the gang comes to offer an exchange of Mrs. Favor for the money and water, but John refuses, stating no one wants Mrs. Favor back. Both groups are forced to head back to town, and Favor must apologize to John since they now need his help.

Later on, Favor snatches a shotgun from a resting Mendez and tries to make off with the money and all the water on his own. John catches him, and exiles him from the group. The remaining group makes it to an abandoned mining shack for shelter, but the gang approaches from another side and also shelters in an adjacent building. They are revealed when Jessie sees Dr. Favor, and foolishly calls him to the shelter. After a shootout in which Grimes is severely injured, the Mexican ties up Mrs Favor in view of the shack, with no shade from the hot sun; an exchange of Mrs Favor for the money is offered, John refuses. Jessie wants to help Mrs. Favor, but John insists they would be killed as soon as they turned over the money.

With Mrs. Favor near death, and continued debate within the group, Jessie decides to take the money down and exchange it for Mrs Favor. John stops her, gives his rifle to Billy Lee with instructions to kill the Mexican so that he can handle Grimes. He takes the money from the saddlebags, telling Billy to ensure it is properly returned to the Apaches, to which Billy agrees. John takes the saddlebags filled with rags down to the Mexican and cuts free Mrs. Favor, allowing her to climb the stairs to the shack. She is weary from her ordeal and makes it slowly, obscuring Billy's shot of the Mexican. When Grimes sees the saddlebags do not contain money, John pulls his revolver on both Grimes and the Mexican, killing them both, but not before the Mexican shoots John fatally. In his dying breaths the Mexican asks the name of the man he shot, who he had been calling hombre the entire time; he is told, 'John Russell.'

== Cast ==
- Paul Newman as John Russell
- Fredric March as Favor
- Richard Boone as Grimes
- Diane Cilento as Jessie
- Cameron Mitchell as Braden
- Barbara Rush as Audra Favor
- Peter Lazer as Billy Lee
- Margaret Blye as Doris
- Martin Balsam as Mendez
- Skip Ward as Steve Early
- Frank Silvera as Mexican Bandit
- David Canary as Lamar Dean
- Val Avery as Delgado
- Larry Ward as Soldier

== Production ==
The movie was filmed on location in the Coronado National Forest in Arizona, at the Helvetia Mine in Pima County, Arizona, at Old Tucson, Arizona, and at the Bell Ranch in Santa Susana, California. Stage station scenes were filmed at Jean Dry Lake, Las Vegas, Nevada.

Janice Rule was originally cast as Audra Favor, but was replaced by Barbara Rush shortly before filming. A Los Angeles Times article claimed that Rule had wanted script rewrites for her character, which were denied.

== Reception ==
=== Box office ===
The film earned $6.5 million in rentals in North America, making it one of the biggest hits of the year.

According to Fox records, the film needed to earn $9,600,000 in rentals to break even and made $9,910,000, meaning it made a profit.

=== Critical reaction ===
Most reviews of the film are positive. Critics praise the performance of Newman and the writing of Elmore Leonard. Film critic Roger Ebert, in a 1967 review, notes, "The performances are uniformly excellent. Three particularly pleasing ones, however, were from Diane Cilento, the boarding-house operator who talks Hombre into his ethical heroics; Richard Boone as the villainous Cicero Grimes, and Martin Balsam, as the good Mexican. Ritt directs with a steady hand, and the dialog by Irving Ravetch and Harriet Frank bears listening to. It's intelligent, and has a certain grace, as well. Last year, Richard Brooks' The Professionals was the best-directed film out of Hollywood, and this year it looks as if the honors may rest with Martin Ritt and Hombre." Ebert gave the film a rating of three and a half out of four possible stars in his review.

Hombre holds a 93% approval rating on the film review aggregator Rotten Tomatoes, based on 14 reviews with an average rating of 8.1/10.

== See also ==
- List of American films of 1967
