= 3:10 to Yuma (1957 film) =

American western film by Delmer Daves

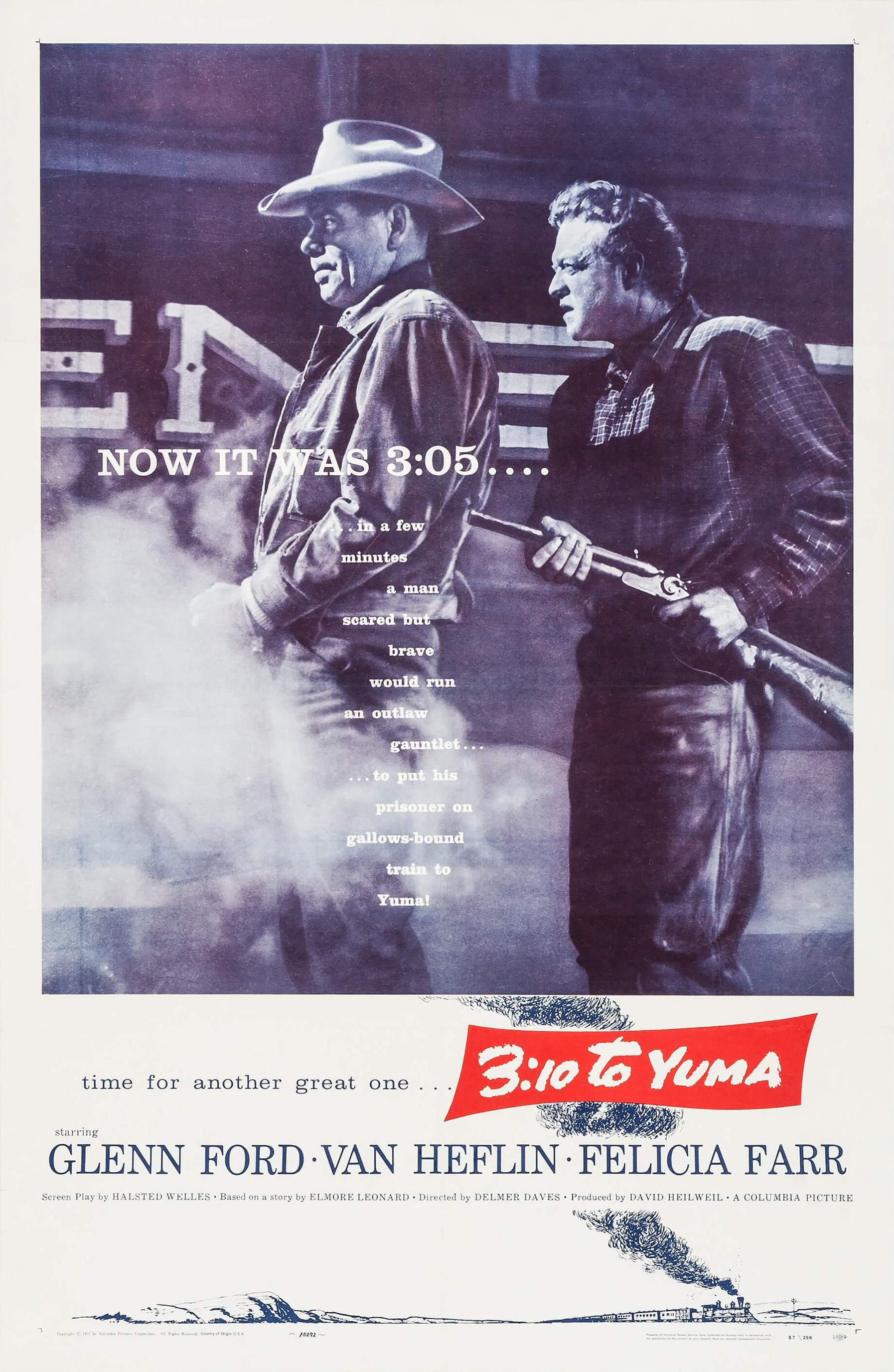
- Theatrical release poster
- Directed by: Delmer Daves
- Screenplay by: Halsted Welles
- Based on: "Three-Ten to Yuma"; 1953 short story by Elmore Leonard
- Produced by: David Heilweil
- Starring: Glenn Ford; Van Heflin; Felicia Farr
- Cinematography: Charles Lawton Jr.
- Edited by: Al Clark
- Music by: George Duning
- Color process: Black and white
- Production company: Columbia Pictures
- Distributed by: Columbia Pictures
- Release date: August 7, 1957 (USA)
- Running time: 92 minutes
- Country: United States
- Language: English
- Box office: $1.85 million dollars (US and Canadian rentals)

3:10 to Yuma is a 1957 American Western film directed by Delmer Daves and starring Glenn Ford and Van Heflin. Based on a 1953 short story of the same name by Elmore Leonard, the plot concerns an impoverished rancher who takes on the risky job of escorting a notorious outlaw to justice.

In 2012, the film was selected for preservation in the United States on the National Film Registry by the Library of Congress in Washington, D.C. as being "culturally, historically, or aesthetically significant." The film was remade in 2007, directed by James Mangold and starring Russell Crowe with Christian Bale.

The title song, "The 3:10 to Yuma", was written by George Duning (music) and Ned Washington (lyrics), and sung at the beginning and end of the film by the noted pop singer Frankie Laine (1913–2007), who also did several other popular Western film and television musical theme songs. He recorded the song for Columbia Records also in 1957 with the Jimmy Carroll Orchestra when the feature film was released, and later repeated in 1960 with the Johnny Williams Orchestra (future famous film music theme composer, born 1932). It was also recorded again seven years later by Sandy Denny in 1967 for Island Records.

== Plot ==
In the 1880s Arizona Territory, struggling rancher Dan Evans and his two sons witness a gang led by notorious outlaw Ben Wade rob a passing coach of the famous Butterfield Overland Mail stagecoach line. When the stagecoach driver manages to overpower one of the robbers, Wade calmly shoots both men dead. On the way south to the border with Mexico, the robbers stop at a saloon in Bisbee for drinks. Wade and his men, posing as cowhands, alert the town marshal of the nearby robbery and the murders. A posse is called out for and assembled, and Wade instructs his gang to ride quickly across the border to safety until he can rejoin them while the posse heads back toward the stage. The posse meets up with Dan and the well-known Butterfield stagecoach company's prominent owner, Mr. Butterfield. They describe the perpetrators to the posse, who identify Wade and realize they have been tricked. The town drunk, Alex Potter, catches up to them and tells them one of the gang members is still in the saloon. They surmise it is Wade and turn back to capture him. Charlie Prince, Wade's second-in-charge, returns to Bisbee to see what is delaying Wade just before the posse arrives back in town. Evans distracts Wade, allowing the marshal to approach Wade from behind and arrest him. Prince is shot in the hand but escapes on his horse to summon and retrieve the rest of the gang to help out.

The marshal requests two volunteers to escort Wade to nearby Contention City to catch the 3:10 train going further west to Yuma, Arizona, on the Southern Pacific Railroad's new trans-continental line near the western territorial border with California and a larger major town, where he can be held for trial. Butterfield offers to pay any volunteer $200, and Dan and Alex volunteer their services. The marshal has a man pretending to be Wade placed on a stagecoach leaving town that evening, hoping to mislead Wade's men and buy Dan and Alex some time. Wade is taken to Dan's ranch, where Alice Evans, his wife, learns of her husband's decision. Wade is subsequently moved to Contention City, where Dan and Potter meet Butterfield in a hotel room to wait for the train. Wade tries to bribe Dan into releasing him but is impressed by Dan's refusal.

The slain stagecoach driver's brother, Bob Moons, arrives and barges into the hotel room seeking revenge. Dan wrestles his gun away, but it fires. Prince, having secretly tracked the party to Contention, hears the gunshot and alerts Wade's gang. The local sheriff is out of town, so Butterfield hires five men to provide security while Wade is taken to the rail station. As the gang surrounds the hotel, the locals flee, once again leaving only Dan, Alex and Butterfield. Alex saves Dan from gunfire from an outlaw on the roof, but Prince shoots Alex in the back and has the men hang him from the hotel chandelier. Butterfield is horrified and offers to pay Dan his $200, planning to release Wade. Alice arrives and tries to change her husband's mind, but he is committed to seeing Wade brought to justice. Dan takes Wade out a back door, skillfully moving him across town as the outlaws fire at them.

The outlaws finally reach Dan as the train starts to leave. Prince shouts for Wade to take cover so he can shoot Dan. Instead, Wade tells Dan to jump into the passing car, and they leap to safety together. The gang runs after the train, but Dan shoots Prince dead and the rest abandon the pursuit. Wade explains that he owed Dan a favor for saving his life from Bob Moon's attack, and he claims that he has escaped from the infamous Yuma Territorial Prison before, meaning Dan will be able to claim his reward honestly. Alice sees Dan leave safely on the train as rain pours down on her, breaking the long drought.

== Cast ==
- Glenn Ford as Ben Wade
- Van Heflin as Dan Evans
- Felicia Farr as Emmy
- Leora Dana as Alice Evans
- Henry Jones as Alex Potter
- Richard Jaeckel as Charlie Prince
- Robert Emhardt as Mr Butterfield
- Sheridan Comerate as Bob Moons
- George Mitchell as Mac
- Robert Ellenstein as Ernie Collins
- Ford Rainey as Marshal of Bisbee
- Woodrow Chambliss as blacksmith (uncredited)
- Boyd Stockman as Bill Moons (uncredited)
- Jerry Hartleben as Mark Evans
- Barry Curtis as Mathew Evans (uncredited)
- Dorothy Adams as Mrs. Potter (uncredited)

== Production ==
David Heilweil brought the story to the Associates and Aldrich, the production company of Robert Aldrich. Halsted Welles wrote a script, which Aldrich sold to Columbia for $100,000.

== Reception ==
In a contemporary review for The New York Times, critic Bosley Crowther noted the strong thematic similarity between 3:10 to Yuma and High Noon (1952). He wrote: "[D]espite the similarity, '3:10 to Yuma' is a good Western film, loaded with suspenseful situations and dusty atmosphere. .... A good, lively script has been written by Halsted Welles, and sharp, business-like direction has been contributed by Delmer Daves. What's more, the whole thing is neatly acted."

On the review aggregator website Rotten Tomatoes, 94% of 32 critics' reviews are positive. Metacritic, which uses a weighted average, assigned the film a score of 80 out of 100, based on 12 critics, indicating "generally favorable" reviews.

== Legacy ==
In 1958, 3:10 to Yuma was nominated for the British Academy of Film and Television Arts award for Best Film and the Laurel Award for Top Male Action Star, which was awarded to Van Heflin.

The film was remade in 2007, directed by James Mangold and starring Russell Crowe and Christian Bale, and it was successful with critics.

In 2012, the film was entered into the National Film Registry for its historical, cultural and aesthetic relevance.

The film caused "Yuma" to enter the lexicon of Cuban slang as a term for American visitors, while "La Yuma" is the United States.

== Home video ==
A Region 1 DVD was released in 2002. A region A/1 Blu-ray version of the film was released as part of the Criterion Collection in 2013. Criterion is set to reissue the film on 4K in February 2026.

== See also ==
- List of American films of 1957
- Arctic Blue, a 1993 take off of 3:10 to Yuma set in Alaska, directed by Peter Masterson and starring Rutger Hauer.
