= Pagan Babies =

2000 novel by Elmore Leonard

- First edition
- Author: Elmore Leonard
- Cover artist: Chip Kidd (designer)
- Language: English
- Publisher: Delacorte Press
- Publication date: 2000
- Publication place: United States
- Media type: Hardcover
- Pages: 263
- ISBN: 0-440-23506-5

Pagan Babies is a 2000 crime novel written by Elmore Leonard. He first used Pagan Babies as the name of a rock band in his 1981 novel Split Images.

== Plot summary ==
The novel begins in Rwanda. The protagonist is a priest named Terry Dunn. It is a few years after the genocide of the Tutsis by the Hutus.

Father Terry lives in Rwanda with his girlfriend Chantelle. He doesn't have qualms about substituting punishment for penance. If that means killing four Hutu murderers who slaughtered his Tutsi congregation, so be it. After being an instrument of divine wrath, Dunn breaks camp and heads for Detroit. He wants to raise money for 'Pagan Babies' — the children orphaned during the genocide.

Dunn's brother Fran specializes in lawsuits for personal injuries. He is helping Debbie, a woman who spent three years in jail for deliberately hitting her ex-husband Randy with a Ford Escort. Debbie is trying to have a career as a comedian. In the meantime we learn more about Terry's past and his problems with the IRS, which was the reason for his fleeing to Rwanda to help his uncle.

Debbie's ex-husband Randy now owns a restaurant and is involved with some of the same gangsters that Terry once knew. Debbie and Terry begin a relationship. Randy stole sixty-seven thousand dollars from Debbie and now it's only a matter of time before Debbie's desire for cold, hard cash and Terry's fundraising for Rwandan orphans join forces in a carefully plotted financial assault on Randy. They want to receive a donation of 250,000 dollars from Tony Amilia, the local wise guy, for the 'Pagan Babies'. In Randy's restaurant all of the local wise guys, hit men, and scam artists twist and twirl around each other for the money and for their lives.
