= The Hunted (novel) =

1977 crime novel by Elmore Leonard

- First edition
- Author: Elmore Leonard
- Language: English
- Genre: Crime/Contemporary
- Publisher: Dell
- Publication date: 1977
- Publication place: United States
- Media type: Hard cover
- Pages: 251
- ISBN: 0440134250

The Hunted is a 1977 crime novel written by Elmore Leonard.

== Plot summary ==
After testifying against Detroit mobsters, Al Rosen, former mortgage broker, is living under witness protection in Israel. Living off of the support payment checks from the business Rosen helped build, delivered by crooked lawyer Mel Bandy, Al Rosen spends his days in a life of relative luxury and relaxation. One evening, while spending an evening at a hotel with Edie Broder, an American tourist, a fire breaks out in the hotel. Rosen helps rescue elderly guests, and a wire-service photograph of his heroism lands in the Detroit Free Press, revealing his location to the Detroit mob.

Mob leadership send enforcer Gene Valenzuela along with a fellow mob hitman and an explosives expert to enact revenge on Rosen for the time Valenzuela spent in prison as a result of Rosen's testimony. Rosen, understanding the danger he is in, attempts to flee, but realises he is trapped until he can recover his passport and receive his money from Bandy, whose agenda double-crosses Rosen and forces him to remain in Israel.

The mob assassins attempt to kill Rosen while he is at a café, but their plan narrowly fails. Rosen teams up with Gunnery Sgt. David E. Davis, U.S. Embassy Marine nearing the end of his service. Davis jumps at the chance to protect Rosen, and the pair is aided by Rosen's local assistant Tali Rose.

Navigating a country unfamiliar to both the American expats and Detroit mobsters, a convoluted chase ensues that leads both parties to the desert outside of Eilat, wherein a violent confrontation ensues. Rosen and his team manage to outmaneuver the mobsters and defeat them.

== Characters in The Hunted ==
- Al Rosen – businessman in the witness protection program
- Tali Rose – assistant to Rosen
- Edie Broder – Rosen's girlfriend
- Sgt. David Davis – U.S. marine
- Mel Bandy – crooked lawyer
- Gene Valenzuela – Detroit city mobsters leader
- Clarence Rashad – Detroit city mobster
- Teddy Cass – Detroit city mobsters explosive expert
