= The Ambassador (1984 American film) =

1984 American thriller film directed by J. Lee Thompson

- US Videocassette Artwork
- Directed by: J. Lee Thompson
- Screenplay by: Max Jack; Ronald M. Cohen (uncredited)
- Based on: 52 Pickup by Elmore Leonard
- Produced by: Menahem Golan; Yoram Globus
- Starring: Robert Mitchum; Ellen Burstyn; Rock Hudson; Fabio Testi; Donald Pleasence
- Cinematography: Adam Greenberg
- Edited by: Mark Goldblatt
- Music by: Dov Seltzer
- Production companies: Northbrook Films; The Cannon Group
- Distributed by: The Cannon Group
- Release date: 1984
- Running time: 97 min.
- Country: United States
- Language: English

The Ambassador is a 1984 American political thriller film directed by J. Lee Thompson and starring Robert Mitchum, Ellen Burstyn, Rock Hudson and Allan Younger. It was the last theatrical release starring Rock Hudson before his death in October 1985.

== Plot ==
U.S. Ambassador to Israel Peter Hacker (Robert Mitchum) and head of security Frank Stevenson (Rock Hudson) are en route to a secret location in the Judaean Desert to meet with representatives of the Palestinian Liberation Organization (PLO). It is part of Hacker’s secret plan to have young Jews and Muslims begin a peaceful dialogue. An armed Israeli helicopter locates and disrupts the meeting by firing on it, causing several deaths. Hacker and Stevenson survive and are apprehended by the Israeli military.

Alex Hacker (Ellen Burstyn), the ambassador’s troubled and lonely wife is in Jerusalem where she is secretly meeting her lover. However, she is followed and their tryst is caught on film by an unknown entity.

Hacker and Stevenson are taken to the office of Israeli Defense Minister Eretz (Donald Pleasence) who confronts them for not informing him on the meeting and reiterates his opposition to Hacker’s peace efforts. Upon returning to the American embassy, Stevenson makes contact to a secret superior where he also voices his concerns and wishes to see an end to Hacker’s assignment as ambassador.

At a diplomatic function later that night, Alex is drunk and making a scene. She leaves early by taxi to meet with her lover once again. While Alex calls her husband from a phone booth in front of his apartment an explosion goes off injuring her and killing several others. Hacker and Stevenson head back to the ambassador’s residence, not knowing Alex’s whereabouts. Hacker is telephoned by an unknown man telling him to make contact at a movie theater, alone. After his arrival he enters the damaged building where the film of his wife’s infidelity plays on a movie screen. Stevenson, who is not far behind, shares in the discovery.

Hacker is informed that his wife is safe and making a full recovery in a hospital. Hacker and Stevenson visit her, where she tells him that she wants to get out of Israel. Back in his office Hacker is again contacted by the unknown man. Conditions are made that if one million dollars in hush money is not paid the film will be released and a private copy will be made available for the President of the United States. Hacker refuses. They also mention the name of Alex’s lover, prompting him to have Stevenson investigate further. Hacker later confronts his wife that night, and tells her about the scheme to blackmail him.

Alex again visits her lover to find his true identity. He turns out to be Mustapha Hashimi (Fabio Testi), a wealthy business man and PLO member. Minister Eretz is informed of the situation and finds the film was made by Mossad agents to keep tabs on the Hackers, although some prints of the film have since been stolen. Stevenson makes headway finding the location where the film was developed and visits the print shop looking for answers. After being duped and knocked out, he catches a woman from the shop and offers her protection. She then reveals the identity of the blackmailers.

Hashimi is also blackmailed, for $500,000, and decides to pay. After learning of this, Hacker sets up a meeting with Hashimi and sees an opportunity to use Hashimi's influence within the PLO to have a peaceful meeting between Jewish and Muslim students. Having learned the identity of the blackmailers from the print shop woman, Stevenson interrogates the blackmailers, who reveal that Hacker is being pursued by a KGB assassin named Stone.

Hacker conducts the meeting with Israeli and Palestinian students at an ancient Roman ruin outside of Tel Aviv and it ends on a positive note with real progress being made between the two groups. However, Palestinian terrorists ambush the students, causing a bloodbath and Hashimi’s assassination. Israeli authorities, Alex and Stevenson arrive to find Hacker alive and head back to the residence where the KGB assassin (Stone) is waiting for Hacker. Just as Stone is about to make a clean shot from his car, Stevenson shoots Stone in the back of the head, leaving the ambassador unscathed. While sitting with his wife, Hacker tells her that he is thinking of resigning, but she disagrees and favors him staying on. He later walks outside onto his front porch only to see a group of young Israeli students holding a peace rally, bringing him to tears.

== Cast ==
- Robert Mitchum as U.S. Ambassador to Israel Peter Hacker
- Ellen Burstyn as Alex (née Douglas) Hacker
- Rock Hudson as Frank Stevenson: Head of Security
- Donald Pleasence as Israeli Defense Minister Eretz
- Fabio Testi as Mustapha Hashimi
- Chelli Goldenberg as Rachel
- Zachi Noy as Ze'ev
- Michal Bat-Adam as Tova
- Yosef Shiloach as Shimon
- Shmulik Kraus as Stone

== Production ==
The political thriller was loosely based on the 1974 crime novel 52 Pickup by Elmore Leonard. Leonard is not credited on the final credits and says on his official site, "Monahem (sic) Golan hired me to adapt my novel, 52 Pickup, and set it in Tel Aviv. I wrote two drafts and then told him to get another writer. He did and the result was The Ambassador which has nothing to do with 52 Pickup. It has none of my characters, none of my situations, nothing. But he still owed me for the screen rights and had to pay up before he could release the picture."

The Ambassador is the first use of film rights to Leonard's novel; in 1986 the novel was adapted under the title 52 Pick-Up, by Cannon Films, and directed by John Frankenheimer.
