= Road Dogs (novel) =

2009 novel by Elmore Leonard

- First edition (publ. William Morrow)
- Author: Elmore Leonard
- Language: English
- Publication date: 2009

Road Dogs is a 2009 novel by author Elmore Leonard. It continues the stories of bank robber Jack Foley (Out of Sight), Cundo Rey (LaBrava), and Dawn Navarro (Riding the Rap).

== Plot summary ==
Jack Foley is sent back to Glades prison and befriends Cundo Rey. Foley and Rey quickly become “road dogs” (inmates who watch each other's back). Rey sets Foley up with an expensive lawyer who gets the kidnapping charge of Karen Sisco dismissed (event from Out of Sight) and also gets Foley's bank robbery sentence significantly reduced. As a result, Foley is soon released, just a month ahead of Rey's upcoming release. Rey arranges for Foley to fly out to Venice Beach and live in one of his houses. Foley soon meets up with Dawn Navarro, Rey's common law wife living in another of Rey's houses across the canal. Navarro tries to recruit Foley in her plot to steal Rey's millions in earnings from various criminal businesses run by Jimmy Rios.
