= Cuba Libre (novel) =

1998 historical novel by Elmore Leonard

- First edition
- Author: Elmore Leonard
- Cover artist: Chip Kidd (designer)
- Language: English
- Publisher: Delacorte Press
- Publication date: 1998
- Publication place: United States
- Media type: Print (Hardcover)
- Preceded by: Riding the Rap
- Followed by: Pagan Babies

Cuba Libre is a 1998 historical novel written by Elmore Leonard. The story takes place in 1898, immediately before the outbreak of the Spanish–American War.

== Plot summary ==
Ben Tyler, a cowboy and sometime bank robber, is released from prison and is recruited by his old boss to ship a string of horses to a rich American sugar baron in Cuba. Their ship arrives in Havana harbor shortly after the explosive destruction of the warship USS Maine, amid rumors that war between Spain and the United States of America is imminent.
