= 3:10 to Yuma (2007 film) =

2007 film by James Mangold

- Theatrical release poster
- Directed by: James Mangold
- Screenplay by: Halsted Welles; Michael Brandt; Derek Haas
- Based on: "Three-Ten to Yuma"; 1953 story in Dime Western Magazine by Elmore Leonard
- Produced by: Cathy Konrad
- Starring: Russell Crowe; Christian Bale; Peter Fonda; Gretchen Mol; Ben Foster; Dallas Roberts; Alan Tudyk; Vinessa Shaw; Logan Lerman
- Cinematography: Phedon Papamichael
- Edited by: Michael McCusker
- Music by: Marco Beltrami
- Production companies: Relativity Media; Tree Line Film
- Distributed by: Lionsgate
- Release dates: August 21, 2007 (Los Angeles); September 7, 2007 (United States)
- Running time: 122 minutes
- Country: United States
- Language: English
- Budget: $48–55 million
- Box office: $71.2 million

3:10 to Yuma is a 2007 American Western action drama film directed by James Mangold and produced by Cathy Konrad, starring Russell Crowe and Christian Bale in the lead roles, with supporting performances by Peter Fonda, Gretchen Mol, Ben Foster, Dallas Roberts, Alan Tudyk, Vinessa Shaw, and Logan Lerman. Bale plays a rancher impoverished by drought who takes on the dangerous but lucrative job of taking a notorious outlaw (Crowe) to justice.

It is the second adaptation of Elmore Leonard's 1953 short story "Three-Ten to Yuma", after the 1957 film of the same name. Filming took place in various locations in New Mexico. 3:10 to Yuma premiered on August 21, 2007 in Los Angeles and was released by Lionsgate on September 7, 2007, in the United States and received positive reviews from critics. It grossed $71.2 million worldwide on a budget of $48–55 million.

== Plot ==
In 1884 Arizona Territory, Dan Evans is a poor rancher and Civil War veteran who owes money to Glen Hollander, a local banker in the town of Bisbee. Hollander's men burn down his barn and scatter his cattle as a warning to pay his debts. The next morning, Evans and his two sons search for their herd but stumble upon Ben Wade and his gang robbing a stagecoach staffed by Pinkertons. Wade sees Evans and his two sons watching from the hills and decides that they are not a threat to his gang. He takes their horses to prevent them from giving warning about the robbery. Wade promises to leave the horses tied up "on the road to Bisbee", so that Evans can recover them. After Wade's gang departs, Evans rescues the lone surviving coach guard, Pinkerton Agent Byron McElroy.

Wade and his gang ride to Bisbee to drink at the local saloon and divide up their loot. The gang departs but Wade chooses to stay behind to enjoy the company of the barmaid. Evans brings McElroy to veterinarian/lawman Doc Potter to tend his wounds and tries in vain to negotiate his debt with Hollander. Evans finds Wade emerging from an upstairs room in the saloon and coaxes a few dollars from Wade over the trouble he caused Evans. As the two talk, lawmen surround the saloon and arrest Wade.

Grayson Butterfield, the railroad's representative, hires a posse consisting of McElroy, Potter, and Tucker (one of Hollander's men) to take Wade to Contention. They are to put Wade on the 3:10 afternoon train to Yuma Territorial Prison. Evans asks for $200 to help deliver Wade, in order to pay his debt to Hollander. Butterfield agrees, and the newly formed posse meet at Evans's ranch. McElroy arranges for a decoy wagon to distract Wade's gang in pursuit.

During the journey, Tucker and McElroy provoke Wade; he stabs Tucker to death with a fork stolen earlier from Evans' home and throws McElroy off a cliff after he insults Wade's mother. Wade attempts to escape but is stopped when Evans's son William appears. The group is ambushed by Apaches. After Wade kills the warriors, he flees into a Chinese laborer construction camp. The foreman of the camp, Walter Boles, captures Wade and the posse arrives to collect him, but Boles, holding an old grudge against the outlaw for the death of his brother, wants to kill Wade. A gunfight breaks out between the two groups, killing Potter while the rest of the posse escape with Wade. They arrive in Contention hours before the train's departure time and check into a hotel, where several local marshals join them.

Wade's gang, led by Charlie Prince, ambushes the decoy wagon and kills everyone after learning that Wade is in Contention. Prince and the others encounter Boles and his crew at the mines and kills them. Upon arriving in Contention, Prince offers a $200 cash reward to anyone who kills one of Wade's captors. Numerous men volunteer, causing the town's marshals to desert; Wade's men kill them when they surrender regardless. Butterfield resigns and even offers Evans $200 anyway to walk away for his trouble but after Evans refuses the offer he agrees to keep William safe at Evans's behest. Evans agrees to put Wade on the prison train if Butterfield pays him $1000, escorts his son safely home, grants his farm access to river water, and gets Hollander to leave his family alone.

Evans escorts Wade out of the hotel, and the two make their way across town, evading gunfire from the gang and the townsmen. Wade surprises Evans and nearly strangles him, but relents when Evans reveals that delivering Wade to the train is not only for his family but his honor as well; he finally reveals to Wade that he lost his leg after retreating in the only battle he ever fought when one of his own men accidentally shot him, requiring part of his leg to be amputated. Wade then admits he has already been to Yuma Prison and escaped twice, and agrees to board the train, allowing Evans's contract to be fulfilled and redeeming Evans to his sons.

Wade helps Evans evade his gang and boards the train. Charlie appears and shoots Evans despite Wade's order to stop. Wade steps off the train, comforting Evans in his final moments. When Charlie returns Wade's gun belt, Wade executes him along with the rest of his gang. William appears and draws his gun on Wade but does not kill him, instead turning to his dying father. Wade boards the train and surrenders his weapon. Evans dies as William tells him he accomplished his mission. Butterfield watches the train depart with Wade on it. As the train disappears around a bend, Wade whistles, and his faithful horse gallops after the train.

== Cast ==
- Russell Crowe as Ben Wade, the ruthless leader of a gang of outlaws
- Christian Bale as Dan Evans, a disabled Civil War veteran turned rancher
- Peter Fonda as Byron McElroy, an elderly bounty hunter working for the railroad who has history with Wade
- Gretchen Mol as Alice Evans, Dan's wife
- Ben Foster as Charlie Prince, Ben's ruthless right-hand in the criminal gang
- Dallas Roberts as Grayson Butterfield, an agent of the Southern Pacific Railroad
- Alan Tudyk as Doc Potter, a veterinarian and volunteer lawman
- Vinessa Shaw as Emma Nelson
- Logan Lerman as William Evans, Dan & Alice's eldest son, who dreams of adventure
- Kevin Durand as Tucker, a sadistic ranch hand employed by Glen Hollander
- Lennie Loftin as Glen Hollander, Dan's creditor
- Forrest Fyre as Walter Boles, a mine foreman with a grudge against Wade
- Johnny Whitworth as Darden
- Luke Wilson as Zeke, a mine guard working under Mr. Boles

== Production ==
In June 2003, Columbia Pictures announced a negotiation with James Mangold to helm a remake of the 1957 Western film 3:10 to Yuma, based on a script written by Michael Brandt and Derek Haas. After being apart from the project for several years, Mangold resumed his role as director in February 2006. Production was slated to begin in summer 2006. In the same month, Tom Cruise expressed an interest in starring as the villain in the film. Eric Bana also briefly sought a role in the film.

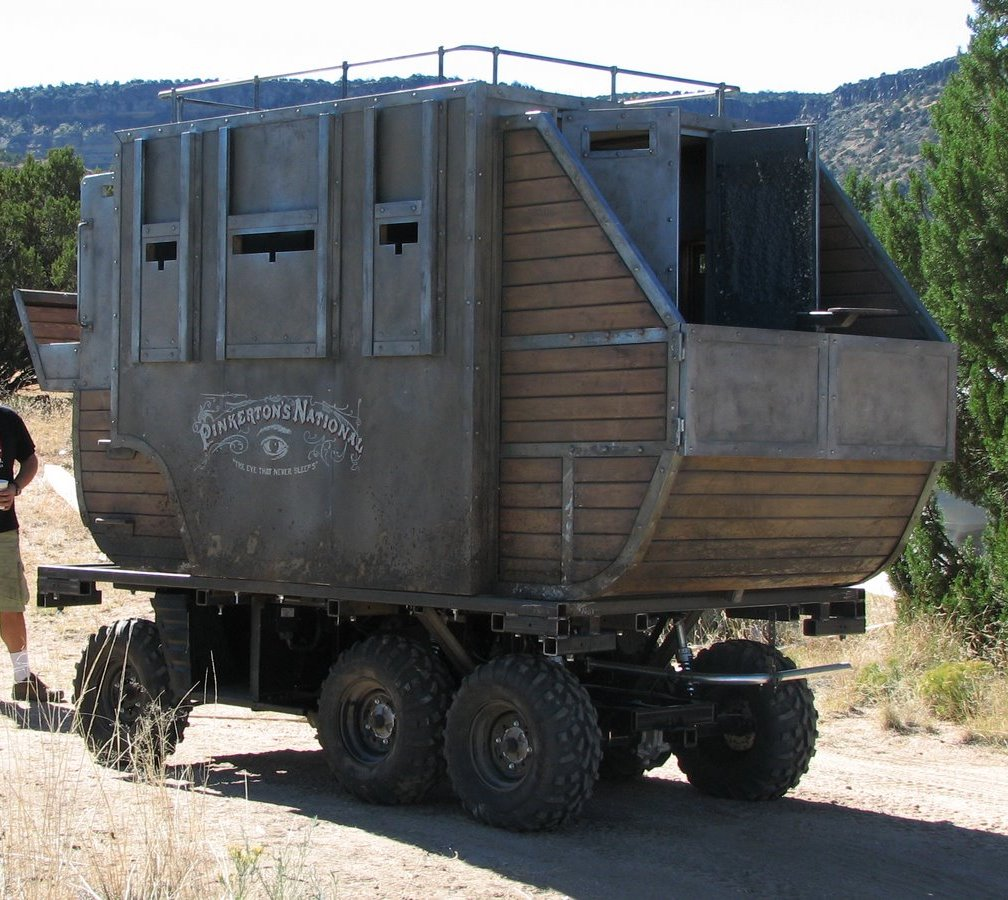
A stagecoach used during filming

In summer 2006, Columbia placed the film in turnaround, and the project was acquired by Relativity Media. Russell Crowe and Christian Bale were cast as the main characters and Relativity began seeking a distributor for the film. By September, Lions Gate Entertainment signed on to distribute the film. Later in the month, Peter Fonda, Gretchen Mol, Dallas Roberts, Ben Foster and Vinessa Shaw were cast. Filming was slated to begin on October 23, 2006, in New Mexico. On the first day of filming, a rider and his horse were seriously injured in a scene when the horse ran directly into a camera-carrying vehicle instead of veering off as planned. The rider was hospitalized, and the horse had to be euthanized on the set. The animal's death prompted an investigation from the American Humane Association. By November, the AHA concluded its investigation, finding that the horse did not respond accordingly due to having received a dual training approach and the rider not being familiar with the mount. The organization recommended no charges against the producers. Principal photography took place in and around Santa Fe, Abiquiú, and Galisteo. The Bonanza Creek Ranch represented the film's town of Bisbee as a "kinder, gentler frontier town" while Galisteo was set up to be Contention (now a ghost town), a "much rougher, bawdier, kind of sin city". Others locations were the scenic Diablo Canyon and the Gilman Tunnels (35.734081°N 106.76475°W) along New Mexico State Road 485. Filming concluded on January 20, 2007.

After filming concluded, the owners of the Cerro Pelon Ranch petitioned to keep a $2 million expansion to the movie set on their property, which was supposed to be dismantled within 90 days. The set of 3:10 to Yuma made up 75% of the overall sets on the ranch. The county's development review committee granted their request, which enabled the possibility of future revenue generation.

== Release ==
3:10 to Yuma was originally slated for an October 5, 2007 release, but Lionsgate moved the film's release a month earlier to September 7, 2007, to beat competing Western films The Assassination of Jesse James by the Coward Robert Ford and No Country for Old Men. As a result of the move, the studio was not able to use the Toronto International Film Festival as a platform for the film's release, but it was released before a cluster of films similarly vying for awards. According to Lionsgate president Tom Ortenberg, "In what is shaping up to be a very impressive and crowded field of upscale commercial motion pictures this fall, we wanted to be one of the first ones out, so that everything else will be measured against us." The earlier theatrical run positioned it for a prominent high-definition Blu-ray Disc and DVD release in the first week of January, during awards seasons. Lionsgate similarly planned this strategy for Crash (2004), which won the Academy Award for Best Picture that year.

== Reception ==
=== Box office ===
3:10 to Yuma debuted in the United States and Canada on September 7, 2007, in 2,652 theaters. In its opening weekend, the film grossed $14 million and ranked #1 at the U.S. and Canadian box office. 3:10 to Yuma grossed $53.6 million in the United States and $17.6 million in other territories for a worldwide total of $71.2 million.

=== Critical response ===
On the review aggregator website Rotten Tomatoes, 89% of 225 critics' reviews are positive, with an average rating of 7.5/10. The website's consensus reads: "This remake of a classic Western improves on the original, thanks to fiery performances from Russell Crowe and Christian Bale as well as sharp direction from James Mangold." Metacritic, which uses a weighted average, assigned the film a score of 76 out of 100, based on 37 critics, indicating "generally favorable" reviews. Audiences polled by CinemaScore gave the film an average grade of "B" on an A+ to F scale.

Andrew Sarris of The New York Observer said "There is more greed-driven corruption in the remake than there was in the original" and that the film is less a remake "than a resurrection of both the film and its now unfashionable genre." Sarris said Fonda and Foster "are especially memorable" and said "the performances of Mr. Crowe and Mr. Bale alone are worth the price of admission." The New Yorker film critic David Denby wrote that the film "is faster, more cynical, and more brutal" than the 1957 film. Denby wrote that Fonda "gives an amazingly fierce performance" and that Crowe "gives a fascinating, self-amused performance", saying "Crowe is an acting genius." Denby said "this is by far [director James Mangold's] most sustained and evocative work." Denby wrote that "much of this Western is tense and intricately wrought." Ty Burr of The Boston Globe called the film "lean, almost absurdly satisfying." Burr wrote that Crowe and Bale "are among the best, most intuitively creative we have, and whatever transpires offscreen in Crowe's case, onscreen they only serve their characters. Neither man showboats here, and it's a thrill to watch them work." Burr said that the character of Ben Wade is "a snake and a snake charmer in one irresistible package" and said Foster as Charlie Prince is "mesmerizing." Burr said "Bale and Crowe never once misstep" and that Mangold "steers clear of Deadwood revisionism." Burr, however, wrote that the ending "makes little to no sense in a post-Clint Eastwood universe."

Bruce Westbrook of the Houston Chronicle gave the film 3½ stars and called it "the best Western since Unforgiven", calling it "both cathartic and intelligent." He wrote that the film "draws clear inspiration from the lonely heroics of High Noon" and said "While a wildly eventful action-adventure and outlaw shoot-'em-up, it's also a vibrant story of heroism, villainy and hard-earned redemption." Westbrook said that Crowe and Bale are "at the top of their game" and "Crowe is reliably charismatic as a man who's less craven and bloodthirsty than wise, resourceful and expedient." Shawn Levy of The Oregonian gave the film a "B+" and said the film is "grounded in something like the credible realism of a John Ford Western but which also can appease the thirsts for blood, wit and tension harbored by fans of Quentin Tarantino." Levy wrote "The original film spends much time on conversation between Wade and Evans and focuses more on Evans's wife, whereas the new film has more action sequences and is infused subtly with themes that echo vexing contemporary political and moral issues." Levy said "Christian Bale gives us another of his wounded, desperate, stubborn men" and "Russell Crowe fills a role originated by Glenn Ford with a big dose of the mocking charisma, cool discernment and casual cruelty of Robert Mitchum." Levy said the climax "sews up the narrative too quickly", but called the film "a fine and sturdy picture."

The Christian Science Monitor critic Peter Rainer gave the film a "B+" and wrote "what Alfred Hitchcock once said about thrillers also applies to Westerns: The stronger the bad guy, the better the film. By that measure, 3:10 to Yuma is excellent." Comparing the film to the 1957 film, Rainer wrote that the film "is larger in scope than its predecessor, and significantly altered in its ending, but essentially it's the same old morality play." Rainer said the "drippy father-son stuff is the least successful aspect of the movie." Rainer also wrote "Bale acts as if he's still playing the POW survivalist from Werner Herzog's Rescue Dawn" and said "his hyperrealistic performance is a drag next to Crowe's dapper prince of darkness." Rainer said Crowe's "underplaying here is in many ways as hammy as if he were overplaying, and that's just fine." Richard Schickel of Time said "when a movie is as entertaining as this one, you begin to think this formerly beloved genre is due for a revival." Schickel said the 1957 film "was, in my opinion, not as good as a lot of people thought" and said Crowe "never settles for predictability when he's on screen and never lets us settle into complacency as we watch him." Schickel wrote that director Mangold "never loses his crispness or his narrative efficiency." Schickel said the comparisons to Unforgiven "are not entirely apt", saying that "Mangold's offering lacks the blackness and absurdity" of that film. He wrote, "It is more in the vein of Anthony Mann's Westerns of the 1950s — trim, efficiently paced, full of briskly stated conflicts that edge up to the dark side, but never fully embrace it."

IGN praised Foster's performance as Charlie Prince, saying, "the real scene-stealer in the film, though, is Foster. Crazy-eyed gunslinger Charlie Prince is like a loyal but wild dog who will maul anyone seeking to hurt his master and would follow him into hell if need be. There is a glance between Ben and Charlie near the end that is one of the most moving and dramatic moments seen in any film this year." UGO ranked Foster's character #50 in their "Best Second-In-Commands", saying that "Stepping up to fill Ben Wade's shoes is tough business, but that's the task the psycho cowboy Charlie Prince was left with when his bank robbing leader was wrangled by the police."

=== Awards and nominations ===
The film received two Academy Award nominations for the 80th Academy Awards. Marco Beltrami was nominated for Best Original Score, and Paul Massey, David Giammarco, and Jim Stuebe were nominated for Best Sound Mixing. The film also received a nomination for Best Cast at the 14th Screen Actors Guild Awards. Ben Foster was nominated for Best Supporting Actor at Saturn Awards and Satellite Awards.

== See also ==
- List of American films of 2007
