= Jim Stuebe =

American sound engineer

- Occupation: Sound engineer
- Years active: 1978-present

Jim Stuebe is an American sound engineer. He was nominated for an Academy Award in the category Best Sound Mixing for the film 3:10 to Yuma. He has worked on over 60 films since 1978.

== Selected filmography ==
- 3:10 to Yuma (2007)
