= Tishomingo Blues (novel) =

Novel by Elmore Leonard

- First edition (publ. William Morrow)
- Author: Elmore Leonard
- Language: English
- Publisher: William Morrow
- Publication date: 2002
- Publication place: United States
- Dewey Decimal: 813/.54
- LC Class: PS3562.E55 T57

Tishomingo Blues is a 2002 novel by Elmore Leonard, set in Mississippi, about two fledgling allies, the local Dixie Mafia, and a high-stakes Civil War re-enactment.

Leonard says that Tishomingo Blues is, of the books he has written, his favorite.

FilmFour planned to make a movie adaptation of the novel, with actor Don Cheadle directing (and possibly starring), but in 2007 Cheadle described the project as "dead".

The title comes from the famous Spencer Williams song "Tishomingo Blues" (1917)..

The novel’s epigraph is taken from the second verse of the song "Tishamingo Blues" (1926) by American blues singer-songwriter and guitarist, Joshua Barnes Howell, better known as Peg Leg Howell.

Characters in the book discuss the music and lives of many blues artists, including Robert Johnson, B.B. King, Stevie Ray Vaughan, Charley Patton, Son House, Howlin' Wolf, John Lee Hooker, Shemekia Copeland, Muddy Waters and the fictional Marvin Pontiac.
