= Killshot (novel) =

1989 novel by Elmore Leonard

- First edition cover
- Author: Elmore Leonard
- Language: English
- Genre: Thriller, Novel
- Publisher: Arbor House (USA) & Viking Press (UK)
- Publication date: March 1989
- Publication place: United States
- Media type: Print (Hardback & Paperback)
- ISBN: 1-55710-041-1 (first edition, hardback)
- OCLC: 18780338
- Dewey Decimal: 813/.54 19
- LC Class: PS3562.E55 K55 1989

Killshot, the 1989 novel by author Elmore Leonard, tells the story of a married couple who find themselves in Cape Girardeau, Missouri while on the run from a pair of hitmen.

== Plot ==
Carmen and Wayne Colson live a quiet, suburban life. Carmen is a realtor while Wayne is an ironworker. Suddenly everything is violently changed when they stumble upon an extortion plot hatched by two crooks, Armand "Blackbird" Degas and his partner Richie Nix. While Richie is unstable and impatient, the Blackbird is calm and collected. After Wayne forces the two away with a Sleever Bar, the criminals decide to exact vengeance on the Colsons, leading to a tense climax.
