= Elmore Leonard =

American novelist and screenwriter (1925–2013)

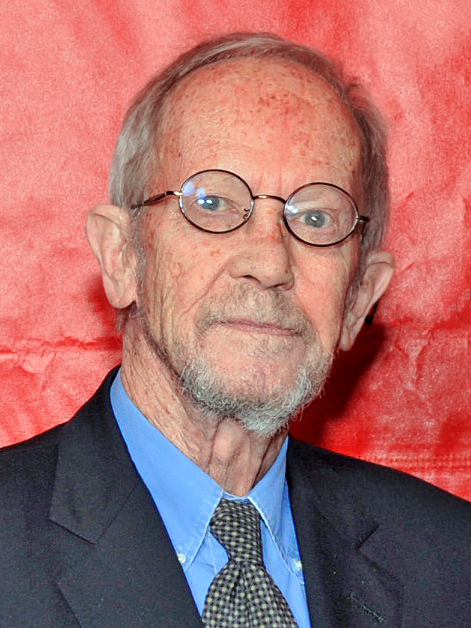
- Leonard at the 70th Annual Peabody Awards Luncheon, 2011
- Born: Elmore John Leonard Jr. October 11, 1925; New Orleans, Louisiana, U.S.
- Died: August 20, 2013 (aged 87); Bloomfield Hills, Michigan, U.S.
- Education: University of Detroit
- Occupation: Writer
- Spouses: Beverly Claire Cline (m. 1949; div. 1977); Joan Shepard (m. 1979; died 1993); Christine Kent (m. 1993; div. 2012)
- Children: 5, including Peter
- Relatives: Megan Freels Johnston (granddaughter)
- Writing career
- Genres: Pulp fiction; Westerns; Crime fiction
- Military career
- Allegiance: United States
- Branch: United States Navy
- Service years: 1943–1946
- Rank: Petty officer third class
- Unit: Seabees
- Conflicts: World War II

Elmore John Leonard Jr. (October 11, 1925 – August 20, 2013) was an American novelist, short story author and screenwriter. He was, according to British journalist Anthony Lane, "hailed as one of the best crime writers in the land". His earliest novels, published in the 1950s, were Westerns, but he went on to specialize in crime fiction and suspense thrillers, many of which have been adapted into motion pictures. Among his best-known works are Hombre, Swag, City Primeval, LaBrava, Glitz, Freaky Deaky, Get Shorty, Rum Punch, Out of Sight and Tishomingo Blues.

Leonard's short story "Three-Ten to Yuma" was adapted as the film 3:10 to Yuma (1957), which was remade in 2007. Rum Punch was adapted as the Quentin Tarantino film Jackie Brown (1997). Steven Soderbergh adapted Out of Sight in 1998 into a film of the same name. Get Shorty was adapted into an eponymous film in 1995 and in 2017 it was adapted into a television series of the same name. His writings were also the basis for The Tall T, as well as the FX television series Justified and Justified: City Primeval. Among other honors, he won the 2009 Pen Lifetime Award and the 2012 Medal For Distinguished Contribution to American Letters.

== Early life and education ==
Leonard was born in New Orleans, Louisiana, the son of Flora Amelia (née Rive) and Elmore John Leonard. Because his father worked as a site locator for General Motors, the family moved frequently for several years. In 1934, the family settled in Detroit. In the 1930s, there were two news items that would influence many of Leonard's works. From 1931, until they were killed in May 1934, gangsters Bonnie and Clyde were on a rampage. In 1934, the baseball team the Detroit Tigers made it to the World Series, winning the Series in 1935. Leonard developed lifelong fascinations with sports and crime. He graduated from the University of Detroit Jesuit High School in 1943 and, after being rejected for the Marines for weak eyesight, immediately joined the Navy, where he served with the Seabees for three years in the South Pacific, where he got the nickname "Dutch", after Tigers pitcher Dutch Leonard.

Enrolling at the University of Detroit in 1946, on the G.I. Bill, he pursued writing more seriously, entering short stories in contests and submitting them to magazines for publication. He graduated in 1950 with a bachelor's degree in English and philosophy. A year before he graduated, he got a job as a copy writer with Campbell-Ewald Advertising Agency, a position he kept for several years, writing on the side.

== Career ==
Leonard had his first success in 1951 when Argosy magazine published his short story "Trail of the Apaches". During the 1950s and early '60s, he continued writing Westerns, publishing more than 30 short stories. His debut novel, The Bounty Hunters, was published in 1953 and was followed by four more Westerns. His early work already showed his affection for outsiders and underdogs. He developed his characters through dialogue, each defined by their manner of speech. In many stories, he favored Arizona and New Mexico as settings. Five of his westerns were adapted as movies before 1972: The Tall T (1957), 3:10 to Yuma (1957), Hombre (1967), Valdez Is Coming (1971), and Joe Kidd (1972).

In 1969, his first crime story, The Big Bounce, was published by Gold Medal Books. Leonard differed from well-known names writing in this genre—he was less interested in melodrama than in his characters and in realistic dialogue. He wrote the screenplay for, and the novelization of, Mr. Majestyk (both 1974); Anthony Lane called the latter "the best novel ever written about a melon grower." The stories were often located in Detroit but he also liked to use South Florida as a setting. LaBrava, a 1983 novel set in the latter locale, was praised in a New York Times review, which said Leonard moved from mystery suspense short story writer to novelist. His next novel, Glitz (1985), an Atlantic City gambling story, was his breakout in the crime genre. It spent 16 weeks on The New York Times Best Seller list, and his subsequent crime novels were all bestsellers. In his review of Glitz, Stephen King placed Leonard in the company of Raymond Chandler, Dashiell Hammett and John D. MacDonald. Leonard believed that his books during the 1980s were becoming funnier and that he was developing a style that was more free and easy. His own favorites were Freaky Deaky (1988), about ex-hippie criminals, and the Dixie Mafia story Tishomingo Blues (2002). Some of Leonard's characters appear in several novels, including mobster Chili Palmer, bank robber Jack Foley and the U. S. Marshals Carl Webster and Raylan Givens.

At the time of his death his novels had sold tens of millions of copies. Among film adaptations of his work are Jackie Brown, (1997), based on Rum Punch and described as an "homage to the author's trademark rhythm and pace"; Get Shorty (1995); Out of Sight (1998) and the TV series Justified (2010–2015) and Justified: City Primeval (2023). Nearly thirty movies were made from Leonard's novels, but for some critics his special style worked best in print.

== Personal life ==
He married Beverly Clare Cline in 1949 and had five children with her—two daughters and three sons—before divorcing in 1977. His second marriage in 1979, to Joan Leanne Lancaster (aka Joan Shepard), ended with her death in 1993. Later that same year, he married Christine Kent; they divorced in 2012. Leonard spent the last years of his life with his family in Oakland County, Michigan. He suffered a stroke on July 29, 2013. Initial reports stated that he was recovering, but on August 20, 2013, Leonard died at his home in the Detroit suburb of Bloomfield Hills of stroke complications. He was 87 years old. One of Leonard's grandchildren is Alex Leonard, drummer in the Detroit band Protomartyr.

== Style and influence ==
Commended by critics for his gritty realism and strong dialogue, Leonard sometimes took liberties with grammar in the interest of speeding the story along. In his essay "Elmore Leonard's Ten Rules of Writing", he said: "My most important rule is one that sums up the 10: If it sounds like writing, I rewrite it." He also said: "I try to leave out the parts that readers tend to skip."

Leonard has been called "the Dickens of Detroit" because of his intimate portraits of people from that city, though he said, "If I lived in Buffalo, I'd write about Buffalo." His favorite epithet was given to him by Britain's New Musical Express: "the poet laureate of wild assholes with revolvers". His ear for dialogue has been praised by writers such as Saul Bellow and Martin Amis. "Your prose makes Raymond Chandler look clumsy," Amis told Leonard at a Writers Guild event in Beverly Hills in 1998. Stephen King called Leonard "the great American writer." According to Charles Rzepka of Boston University, Leonard's mastery of free indirect discourse, a third-person narrative technique that gives the illusion of immediate access to a character's thoughts, "is unsurpassed in our time, and among the surest of all time, even if we include Jane Austen, Gustave Flaubert, and Hemingway in the mix."

Leonard often cited Hemingway as his most important influence but also criticized his lack of humor. Still, it was Leonard's affection for Hemingway, and for George V. Higgins, that led him to will his personal papers to the University of South Carolina, where many of Hemingway's and Higgins' papers are archived. Leonard's papers reside at the university's Irvin Department of Rare Books and Special Collections.

Leonard in turn had a very strong influence on a generation of crime writers that followed him, among them George Pelecanos, Michael Connelly, Dennis Lehane, and Laura Lippman.

Anthony Lane praised Leonard's ear for dialogue, comparing him to Dickens and Evelyn Waugh:

Leonard can make do with a single letter, or a blank where a letter is meant to be. "What in the hell's a Albanian?," a guy named Clement asks in Chapter 4 of City Primeval (1980). Typesetters may have pounced upon what they took to be a typo, but Leonard never misheard. In that respect, as in others, he was less like Hemingway—of whom he was a fan, and to whom he was often compared—than like Dickens, another city kid with his nose and ear to the ground... One proof of literary genius, we might say, is a democratic generosity toward your mother tongue—the conviction that every part or particle of speech, be it e'er so humble, can be put to fruitful use... He is gone now, but he left us a fine consolation: if you've never read him, or if you'd never heard of him until yesterday, or if you merely need a fitting way to mourn, pick up 52 Pick-Up, LaBrava, Swag, or Glitz, and tune into the voices of America—calling loud and clear, and largely ungrammatical, from Atlantic City, Miami, Hollywood, and his home turf of Detroit. Elmore Leonard got them right, and did them proud. As Clement would say, he was a author.

In a review of Swag, The Switch, and Rum Punch, J. Robert Lennon highlighted Leonard's gift for "naturalistic dialogue, its rhythms and characteristic illogic". As an example, Lennon cited a flirtatious line by Ernest "Stick" Stickley in Swag: "You're from somewhere, aren't you? Let me guess."

== Awards and honors ==
- 1984: Edgar Award for Best Mystery Novel of 1983 for LaBrava.
- 1992: Grand Master Award for Lifetime Achievement from the Mystery Writers of America
- 2008: F. Scott Fitzgerald Literary Award for outstanding achievement in American literature; received during the 13th Annual F. Scott Fitzgerald Literary Conference held at Montgomery College in Rockville, Maryland, United States.
- 2010: Peabody Award, FX's Justified
- 2012: National Book Award, Medal for Distinguished Contribution

Leonard has been anthologized by the Library of America in four volumes: Westerns (Last Stand at Saber River, Hombre, Valdez is Coming, Forty Lashes Less One and eight short stories); Four Novels of the 1970s (Fifty-Two Pickup, Swag, Unknown Man No. 89, The Switch); Four Novels of the 1980s (City Primeval, LaBrava, Glitz, Freaky Deaky) and Four Later Novels (Get Shorty, Rum Punch, Out of Sight, Tishomingo Blues and the short story "Karen Makes Out".)

== Works ==
=== Novels ===
Year	Novel	Film adaptation	ISBN
1953	The Bounty Hunters		ISBN 0-380-82225-3
1954	The Law at Randado	1990 – Border Shootout	ISBN 0-062-28950-0
1956	Escape from Five Shadows		ISBN 0-060-01348-6
1959	Last Stand at Saber River	1997 – Last Stand at Saber River	ISBN 0-062-28948-9
1961	Hombre	1967 – Hombre	ISBN 0-062-20611-7
1969	The Big Bounce	1969 – The Big Bounce; 2004 – The Big Bounce	ISBN 0-062-18428-8
1969	The Moonshine War	1970 – The Moonshine War	ISBN 0-062-20898-5
1970	Valdez Is Coming	1971 – Valdez Is Coming	ISBN 0-062-22785-8
1972	Forty Lashes Less One		ISBN 0-062-28949-7
1974	Mr. Majestyk	1974 – Mr. Majestyk	ISBN 0-062-18840-2
1974	52 Pickup	1984 – The Ambassador; 1986 – 52 Pick-Up	ISBN 0-753-81962-7
1976	Swag		ISBN 0-062-22786-6
1977	Unknown Man No. 89		ISBN 0-062-18928-X
1977	The Hunted		ISBN 0-062-18841-0
1978	The Switch	2013 – Life of Crime	ISBN 0-062-20613-3
1979	Gunsights		ISBN 0-062-26726-4
1980	City Primeval	2023 – TV Series Justified: City Primeval	ISBN 0-062-19135-7
1980	Gold Coast	1997 – TV movie	ISBN 0-062-20609-5
1981	Split Images	1992 – TV movie	ISBN 0-688-16971-6
1982	Cat Chaser	1989 – Cat Chaser	ISBN 0-060-51222-9
1983	Stick	1985 – Stick	ISBN 0-062-18435-0
1983	LaBrava; Edgar Award, Best Novel (1984)		ISBN 0-062-22788-2
1985	Glitz	1988 – TV movie	ISBN 0-062-12158-8
1987	Bandits		ISBN 0-062-12032-8
1987	Touch	1997 – Touch	ISBN 0-062-26598-9
1988	Freaky Deaky	2012 – Freaky Deaky	ISBN 0-062-12035-2
1989	Killshot	2008 – Killshot	ISBN 0-688-16638-5
1990	Get Shorty	1995 – Get Shorty; 2017 – TV series Get Shorty	ISBN 0-062-12025-5
1991	Maximum Bob	1998 – TV series Maximum Bob	ISBN 0-062-00940-0
1992	Rum Punch	1997 – Jackie Brown	ISBN 0-062-11982-6
1993	Pronto	1997 – TV movie 2010 – TV series Justified	ISBN 0-062-12033-6
1995	Riding the Rap	2010 – TV series Justified	ISBN 0-062-02029-3
1996	Out of Sight	1998 – Out of Sight; 2003 – TV series Karen Sisco	ISBN 0-061-74031-4
1998	Cuba Libre		ISBN 0-062-18429-6
1999	Be Cool	2005 – Be Cool	ISBN 0-060-77706-0
2000	Pagan Babies		ISBN 0-062-26601-2
2002	Tishomingo Blues		ISBN 0-062-00939-7
2004	Mr. Paradise		ISBN 0-060-59807-7
2004	A Coyote's in the House		ISBN 0-141-31688-8
2005	The Hot Kid		ISBN 0-060-72423-4
2006	Comfort to the Enemy; Published serially in The New York Times		ISBN 0-061-73515-9
2007	Up in Honey's Room		ISBN 0-060-72426-9
2009	Road Dogs		ISBN 0-061-98570-8
2010	Djibouti		ISBN 0-062-00831-5
2012	Raylan	2010 – TV series Justified	ISBN 0-062-11947-8

Leonard also contributed one chapter (the twelfth of thirteen) to the 1996 Miami Herald parody serial novel Naked Came the Manatee (ISBN 0-449-00124-5).

=== Collections ===
Year	Collection	ISBN
1998	The Tonto Woman and Other Western Stories	ISBN 0-385-32387-5
2002	When the Women Come Out to Dance; Later reprint retitled Fire in the Hole	ISBN 0-060-58616-8
2004	The Complete Western Stories of Elmore Leonard	ISBN 0-060-72425-0
2006	Moment of Vengeance and Other Stories	ISBN 0-060-72428-5
2006	Blood Money and Other Stories	ISBN 0-06-125487-8
2006	Three-Ten To Yuma and Other Stories	ISBN 0-06-133677-7
2007	Trail of the Apache and Other Stories	ISBN 0-06-112165-7
2009	Comfort to the Enemy and Other Carl Webster Stories	ISBN 0-297-85668-5
2014	Charlie Martz and Other Stories: The Unpublished Stories of Elmore Leonard	ISBN 0-297-60979-3

=== Short stories ===
Year	Story	First appearance	Film adaptation
1951-12	"Trail of the Apache"	Argosy	
1952-05	"Apache Medicine"	Dime Western Magazine	
1952-09	"You Never See Apaches..."	Dime Western Magazine	
1952-10	"Red Hell Hits Diablo Canyon"	10 Story Western Magazine	
1952-11	"The Colonel's Lady"	Zane Grey's Western	
1952-12	"Law of the Hunted Ones"	Western Story Magazine	
1952-12	"Cavalry Boots"	Zane Grey's Western	
1953-01	"Under the Friar's Ledge"	Dime Western Magazine	
1953-02	"The Rustlers"	Zane Grey's Western	
1953-03	"Three-Ten to Yuma"	Dime Western Magazine	1957 – 3:10 to Yuma; 2007 – 3:10 to Yuma
1953-04	"The Big Hunt"	Western Story Magazine	
1953-05	"Long Night"	Zane Grey's Western	
1953-06	"The Boy Who Smiled"	Gunsmoke	
1953-08	"The Hard Way"	Zane Grey's Western	
1953-09	"The Last Shot"	Fifteen Western Tales	
1953-10	"Blood Money"	Western Story Magazine	
1953-10	"Trouble at Rindo's Station"	Argosy	
1954-10	"Saint with a Six-Gun"	Argosy	
1955-02	"The Captives"	Argosy	1957 – The Tall T
1955-08	"No Man's Guns"	Western Story Roundup	
1955-09	"The Rancher's Lady"	Western Magazine	
1955-12	"Jugged"	Western Magazine	
1956-04-21	"Moment of Vengeance"	Saturday Evening Post	
1956-09	"Man with the Iron Arm"	Complete Western Book	
1956-10	"The Longest Day of His Life"	Western Novel and Short Stories	
1956-11	"The Nagual"	2-Gun Western	
1956-12	"The Kid"	Western Short Stories	
1958-06	"The Treasure of Mungo's Landing"	True Adventures	
1961	"Only Good Ones"	Western Roundup	Later expanded to the novel and adapted as Valdez is Coming
1982	"The Tonto Woman"	Roundup	2007 – Academy Awards nominated Live Action Short
1994	"Hurrah for Captain Early!"	New Trails	
1996	"Karen Makes Out"	Murder For Love – Delacorte Press 1996	First episode in Karen Sisco TV series
2001	"Fire in the Hole"	ebook (ISBN 0-062-12034-4)	2010 – TV series Justified
2001	"Chickasaw Charlie Hoke"	Murderers' Row: Original Baseball Mysteries	
2005	"Louly and Pretty Boy"	Dangerous Women - Mysterious Press 1996	
2012	"Chick Killer"	McSweeney's - Issue 39	

=== Screenplays ===
Year	Title	Director	Co-writers
1970	The Moonshine War	Richard Quine	
1972	Joe Kidd	John Sturges	
1974	Mr. Majestyk	Richard Fleischer	
1980	High Noon, Part II (TV)	Jerry Jameson	
1985	Stick	Burt Reynolds	Joseph Stinson
1986	52 Pick-Up	John Frankenheimer	John Steppling
1987	The Rosary Murders	Fred Walton	William X. Kienzle & Fred Walton
1987	Desperado (TV Movie)	Virgil W. Vogel	
1989	Cat Chaser	Abel Ferrara	James Borelli

=== Audiobooks ===
Nearly all of Leonard's novels have been performed as audiobooks. A number of them (including The Big Bounce, Be Cool and The Tonto Woman) have been recorded more than once resulting in more than 60 English-language audiobook versions of his novels. Many of the earlier recordings were abridgements, the last of which was Pagan Babies (2000) read by Steve Buscemi. Certain narrators have dominated the Elmore Leonard oeuvre, notably Frank Muller (11 audiobooks), Grover Gardner aka Alexander Adams (7), George Guidall (5), Mark Hammer (5), and Joe Mantegna (5). Other notable Leonard narrators include Liev Schreiber, Neil Patrick Harris, Tom Wopat, Arliss Howard, Joe Morton, Taye Diggs, Brian Dennehy, Bruce Boxleitner, Tom Skerritt, Robert Forster, Dylan Baker, Paul Rudd, Keith Carradine, Ed Asner, and Henry Rollins.

=== Nonfiction ===
- 10 Rules of Writing (2007)
- Foreword to Walter Mirisch's book I Thought We Were Making Movies, Not History

== Adaptations ==
Twenty-six of Leonard's novels and short stories have been adapted for the screen (19 as motion pictures and another seven as television programs).

=== Film ===
Numerous Leonard novels and short stories have been adapted as films including Get Shorty (1990 novel, 1995 film), Out of Sight (1996 novel, 1998 film) and Rum Punch (1992 novel, 1997 film Jackie Brown). The novel 52 Pickup was first adapted very loosely into the 1984 film The Ambassador (1984), starring Robert Mitchum and, two years later, under the slightly altered 52 Pick-Up title starring Roy Scheider. Leonard has also written several screenplays based on his novels, plus original screenplays such as Joe Kidd (1972). The film Hombre (1967), starring Paul Newman, was an adaptation of Leonard's 1961 eponymous novel. His short story "Three-Ten to Yuma" (March 1953) and novels The Big Bounce (1969) and 52 Pickup (1974) have each been filmed twice.

Other novels filmed include:

- The Tall T (with Randolph Scott) (from "The Captives")
- 3:10 to Yuma (with Glenn Ford and Van Heflin)
- Hombre (with Paul Newman)
- Mr. Majestyk (with Charles Bronson)
- Jackie Brown (Pam Grier, Samuel L. Jackson, Robert De Niro) from Rum Punch
- The Big Bounce (with Ryan O'Neal)
- Valdez Is Coming (with Burt Lancaster)
- 52 Pick-Up (with Roy Scheider, Ann Margaret)
- Stick (with Burt Reynolds)
- The Moonshine War (with Alan Alda and Patrick McGoohan)
- Last Stand at Saber River (with Tom Selleck)
- Gold Coast (with David Caruso)
- Glitz (with Jimmy Smits)
- The Ambassador (Robert Mitchum, Rock Hudson, Ellen Burstyn)
- Cat Chaser (with Peter Weller)
- Out of Sight (George Clooney, Jennifer Lopez, Don Cheadle)
- Touch (with Christopher Walken)
- Pronto (with Peter Falk)
- Be Cool (with John Travolta, Harvey Keitel, Uma Thurman)
- The Big Bounce (with Morgan Freeman, Owen Wilson, Gary Sinise)
- Killshot (Diane Lane, Mickey Rourke).
- Get Shorty (with John Travolta, Gene Hackman, Danny DeVito)
- Freaky Deaky (with Christian Slater, Crispin Glover)
- Life of Crime (Jennifer Aniston) (from The Switch)
- 3:10 to Yuma (with Christian Bale, Russell Crowe, Peter Fonda)
- Border Shootout (with Glenn Ford) (from The Law at Randado)
- Split Images (with Gregory Harrison, Rebecca Jenkins)
- The Arrangement (with Bryan Greenberg) (from "When the Women Come Out to Dance")

Quentin Tarantino has optioned the right to adapt Leonard's novel Forty Lashes Less One (1972).

=== Television ===
- In 1992, Leonard played himself in a script he wrote and, with actor Paul Lazar dramatizing a scene from the novel Swag, appeared in a humorous television short about his writing process which aired on the Byline Showtime series on Showtime Networks.
- The 2010–15 FX series Justified was based around the popular Leonard character Deputy U.S. Marshal Raylan Givens from the novels Pronto, Riding the Rap, the eponymous Raylan, and the short story "Fire in the Hole".
- The short-lived 1998 TV series Maximum Bob was based on Leonard's 1991 novel of the same name. It aired on ABC for seven episodes and starred Beau Bridges.
- The TV series Karen Sisco (2003–04) starring Carla Gugino was based on the Deputy U.S. Marshal character from the film Out of Sight (1998) played by Jennifer Lopez.
- The 2017 Epix series Get Shorty is based on the novel of the same.
