= Rum Punch =

1992 novel by Elmore Leonard

- First edition
- Author: Elmore Leonard
- Language: English
- Publisher: Delacorte Press
- Publication date: 1992
- Publication place: United States
- Media type: Print (hardcover)
- Pages: 344
- ISBN: 0-385-30143-X
- OCLC: 24671033
- Dewey Decimal: 813/.54 20
- LC Class: PS3562.E55 R8 1992

Rum Punch is a 1992 novel written by Elmore Leonard that was adapted into the film Jackie Brown (1997) by director Quentin Tarantino.

The characters Ordell Robbie, Louis Gara and Melanie Ralston first appeared in Leonard's novel The Switch, which itself has also been adapted as a film, Life of Crime, first shown at the 2013 Toronto International Film Festival, with Isla Fisher as Melanie and Gara portrayed by John Hawkes.

== Plot ==
Set in the South Florida cities of West Palm Beach and Miami, Rum Punch follows Jackie Burke, a 44-year-old flight attendant for a bottom-rung airline, who has been smuggling illegal cash into the U.S. from Jamaica for small-time gunrunner and aspiring crime boss Ordell Robbie. When U.S. agents arrest Jackie after catching her smuggling this "dirty money", they use the threat of prison and job loss to pressure her into acting as bait in their plan to catch Ordell. Upon learning of this, Ordell pressures Jackie into intentionally misleading and stalling the police long enough for her to smuggle the remainder of his "retirement score" money into the US.

Hopelessly caught between two no-win scenarios, both dooming her to lifelong poverty, since she's too old to start over again, a desperate Jackie devises a secret, risky plan of her own to double-cross Ordell and the police, save herself, and secure her future. To execute this plan, Jackie must enlist the help of Max Cherry—the same bail bondsman Ordell hired to get Jackie out of jail. Louis Gara, Ordell's longtime criminal associate, works for Cherry and becomes involved in the gun running.
