= Split Images =

1981 crime novel by Elmore Leonard

- First edition
- Author: Elmore Leonard
- Language: English
- Genre: Crime/Contemporary
- Publisher: Arbor House
- Publication date: 1981
- Publication place: United States
- Media type: Hard cover
- Pages: 282
- ISBN: 0-688-16971-6

Split Images is a 1981 crime novel written by Elmore Leonard.

== Plot summary ==
The novel begins in Detroit and tells the story of Robbie Daniels, a multimillionaire who guns down a Haitian refugee who broke into his Palm Beach mansion, calling it "practice". Walter Kouza, a 21-year veteran of the Detroit Police Department, sees this case as his one chance to quit being a cop and go to work for a big shot. The only one who can stop him is Lieutenant Bryan Hurd, whose unique method of investigation is supported by his good-looking lover and journalist Angela Nolan. The two follow Daniels and Kouza when they travel Florida to find their next victim: a diplomat and drug dealer.
