= La Brava (novel) =

1983 novel by author Elmore Leonard

LaBrava
- First edition
- Author: Elmore Leonard
- Language: English
- Genre: Thriller,
- Publisher: Arbor House
- Publication date: January 1983
- Publication place: United States
- Media type: Print (Hardback & Paperback)
- ISBN: 0-380-69237-6
- OCLC: 11351383

LaBrava, the 1983 novel by author Elmore Leonard, follows the story of Joe LaBrava, former Secret Service agent. This novel won the 1984 Edgar Award for Best Novel.

== Plot summary ==
Joe LaBrava gets involved with former movie star Jean Shaw, an actress whom he had admired when he was a twelve-year-old boy, before discovering that she is being harassed by thug Richard Nobles and his partner Cundo Rey.

== Reception ==
According to Christopher Lehmann-Haupt of The New York Times, "What's unusual about LaBrava is that no matter how complicated its implications grow, it remains firmly rooted in its realistic milieu. And despite all the double-crossing mayhem it metes out, nobody gets hurt who doesn't deserve to. The only innocent victim is the dream of Florida as a golden sunset for the old and infirm to fade peacefully into."

== Cancelled movie ==
Dustin Hoffman was slated to appear in a movie adaptation of LaBrava. It was cancelled due to a contract dispute.
