= The Big Bounce =

The Big Bounce may refer to:

- Big Bounce, cosmic theory
- The Big Bounce (novel), a 1969 crime novel written by Elmore Leonard
- The Big Bounce (1960 film), directed by Jerry Fairbanks
- The Big Bounce (1969 film), film based on the novel
- The Big Bounce (2004 film), film based on the novel
