= Swag (novel) =

1976 novel by Elmore Leonard

- First hardcover edition
- Author: Elmore Leonard
- Language: English
- Genre: Crime/Contemporary
- Publisher: Delacorte Press
- Publication date: 1976
- Publication place: United States
- Media type: Hardcover
- Pages: 229
- ISBN: 0-440-18424-X
- Preceded by: The Big Bounce
- Followed by: Unknown Man No. 89

Swag is a crime novel by Elmore Leonard, first published in 1976. It has since been released as an audiobook. The first paperback edition was published under the alternative title of Ryan's Rules.

Ernest Stickley, Jr. reappears in Stick.

== Plot summary ==
Frank Ryan is an almost honest used car salesman, who after deliberately not testifying against car thief Ernest "Stick" Stickley, Jr., thinks of a foolproof plan for them to perform armed robberies. The plan is about simple everyday armed robbery. Because statistics prove that this armed robbery pays the most for the least risk, they start their business and earn three to five thousand dollars a week. To prevent getting caught Frank introduces 10 golden rules for successful armed robbery.

For a while, Frank and Stick follow the rules and the plan and they are extremely successful. They even rob the robber who robbed the bar they were in and planning to rob. Inevitably, Frank starts disregarding the rules he came up with. When Frank sees an opportunity to pull a major heist at a department store, he and Stick get involved with Sportree and Leon Woody. In between the cops and the scheming Sportree, Frank and Stick get into a very tight spot that could get them both killed.

== Critical reception ==
The Guardian in a 2004 review, "There is also a period-specific charm to old crime novels, but in many ways, Leonard hasn't dated at all. This may be because now everywhere feels like mid-70s Detroit; and it may also be because we are now fluent in the dialogue of his characters."
