= O. L. Williams =

American entrepreneur and industrialist (1865–1952)

Oliver Lafayette Williams
- Born: November 16, 1865; Fork, North Carolina, United States
- Died: November 20, 1952 (aged 87)
- Other name: O. L. Williams
- Occupations: Entrepreneur and industrialist
- Known for: Development of the furniture industry
- Children: 4

Oliver Lafayette "O. L." Williams (November 16, 1865 – November 20, 1952) was an American entrepreneur and industrialist born in Fork, North Carolina primarily associated with the furniture industry. He was president of Williams Furniture Co. in Sumter, South Carolina from the time of the company's organization in 1924 until his death in 1952.

== Early life and education ==
Williams was born born in Fork, North Carolina in 1865, he attended the University of North Carolina.

== Career ==
His first business venture was in plug tobacco. He entered the furniture industry for the first time when he invested in a furniture company based in Mocksville, North Carolina, which later burned down. He then founded a veneer company there, which eventually expanded to have plants in other locations, including Rural Hall and High Point, N.C; Camden, Conway, and Sumter S.C; and Montgomery, AL.

When the Sumter Board of Trade desired to start a furniture factory in their town to bolster the local economy, Williams provided some of the capital to help start the business and was elected president of Sumter Furniture Corporation in 1924. It was renamed O.L. Williams Top and Panel Company by the Board of Trade in his honor, then became Williams Furniture Company three years later. In this way, Williams profited off of the Southern boosterism of the 1920s, though due to the presence of other furniture companies in Sumter, Williams and Sumter were able to maintain a better balance of power between industry and community than many other Southern towns.

During his tenure as president of Williams Furniture Co, Williams personally negotiated with striking workers, who later officially organized into a local branch of the United Brotherhood of Carpenters and Joiners of America and went on strike again. Of this second strike, Williams thought that it was a movement started by outsiders who didn't actually care for the well-being of his workers, as their list of demands included points such as fewer hours, something uncommonly negotiated for during the Depression, and other points had been company policy prior to the strike. When the CIO eventually established itself in Williams' factories, its lack of major organizing success, especially during its Operation Dixie campaign, is generally considered to be more a result of poor planning and strategy by the CIO than direct opposition by Williams and other factory leadership.

Williams' great-grandson, Frank Edwards, recalls one of Williams' greatest strengths was being able to "hire the right people," who he could rely on to help run his businesses without taking everything on himself.

Williams' other ventures included Southern Coatings and Chemical Co, Russellville Lumber Co, Clarendon Flooring Co, Kingstree Lumber Manufacturing Co, and the Carolina Western Railroad. He was at one point a director for the National Bank of South Carolina.

== Personal life and legacy ==
Williams was a long-time member of the Masons and was a member of Sumter's Rotary Club for a time. He participated on the board of stewards for Trinity Methodist Church, also in Sumter.

In his will, Williams gave each of his daughters, Louise Edwards and Martha Brice, a third of his estate and set up a trust fund for his son, Charles Frank Williams. Williams-Brice Stadium is named after Martha Brice in honor of a donation from Brice's estate, created from this inheritance.

Further philanthropy is continued by his descendants, including Frank Edwards, as part of the Williams-Brice-Edwards Charitable Trust.
