= Bliss (1997 film) =

- Theatrical release poster
- Directed by: Lance Young
- Written by: Lance Young
- Produced by: Allyn Stewart
- Starring: Craig Sheffer; Sheryl Lee; Terence Stamp; Casey Siemaszko; Spalding Gray
- Cinematography: Mike Molloy
- Edited by: Allan Lee
- Music by: Jan A. P. Kaczmarek
- Distributed by: Triumph Films
- Release date: June 6, 1997
- Running time: 99 minutes
- Country: United States
- Language: English
- Box office: $294,064

Bliss is a 1997 American erotic drama film written and directed by Lance Young, in his film debut. It stars Sheryl Lee, Craig Sheffer, and Terence Stamp. The film also features appearances by Lance Young's sister, Leigh Taylor-Young, as well as Molly Parker. The story revolves around a young married couple who are trying to address issues impacting their sex life. The film is a surreptitious analysis on the teachings of tantric sex.

Media attention on the film was limited yet the reception was divided among critics. It was screened during the opening of the San Francisco International Film Festival.

== Plot ==
Maria (Sheryl Lee) and Joseph (Craig Sheffer) are a young couple, married for only six months, but already facing issues that prevent them from enjoying a fulfilling sex life. In their attempt to address and resolve the issue, they reach out to marriage counsellor Alfred (Spalding Gray). During the process, Joseph is shocked to find out that Maria has never had a genuine orgasm when they had sex with each other. Meanwhile, Maria, who is not happy with the results of Alfred's traditional psychoanalytic approach, reaches out to Baltazar (Terence Stamp).

Joseph works as an architect at a construction site. One day, while at work, Joseph's site colleagues invite him to spy on an old man who is having sex with The Redhead. It is only when he decides to look through the telescope lens that he finds out that one of the women is Maria. The old man is Baltazar, an alternative sex therapist who engages in sex with his patients as part of his technique. Joseph, furious, confronts Balthazar about him and his wife, but in a turn of events he becomes a patient himself. During one of his attempts to practice the techniques taught by Baltazar, Joseph causes Maria to suffer a seizure, which results in her hospitalization. At that time it is revealed that her sex life dysfunction is linked to the sexual abuse that she suffered as a child, perpetrated by her father. She is now called to confront the memories of her past in order to recover.

== Cast ==
- Sheryl Lee as Maria
- Craig Sheffer as Joseph
- Terence Stamp as Baltazar
- Casey Siemaszko as Tanner
- Spalding Gray as Alfred
- Leigh Taylor-Young as Redhead
- Lois Chiles as Eva
- Blu Mankuma as Nick
- Ken Camroux as Hank
- Pamela Perry as Dottie
- Eli Gabay as Carlos
- Molly Parker as Connie

== Production ==
=== Casting ===
Sheryl Lee researched psychology and attended a tantric sex workshop, in preparation for the role of Maria. Craig Sheffer was hired to be the main character in this movie after Leigh Taylor-Young recommended him to her brother Lance Young. Both Leigh and Craig worked together in the TV series, The Hamptons; Leigh played Craig Sheffer's mom in the five-episode series.

== Soundtrack ==
The score for the film was written by Polish composer Jan A. P. Kaczmarek (winner of the 2005 Academy Award for Best Original Score for Finding Neverland). The soundtrack is furnished with classical orchestra cues, primarily accompanied by piano or violin, and occasionally features a soprano.

== Release ==
=== Critical response ===
The film received mixed reviews from mainstream media critics, as well as from smaller publications. Sheffer and Lee's performances were harshly criticized by The New York Times critic, Stephen Holden, who stated that "If the cast deserves at least half a gold star for pretending to take this stuff seriously, neither Mr. Sheffer nor Ms. Lee are able to make their yuppie characters likable".

Richard von Busack gave a similar opinion regarding Lee's acting, stating that "Almost useless as either erotica or therapy, Bliss squanders Lee. As good as she is as a vengeful girl, she's still awfully soppy as a weeper." At the same time both Lee and Sheffer were praised as extraordinarily layered, powerful, physical and fearless, by Jeffrey M. Anderson of Combustible Celluloid.

Terence Stamp was unanimously considered to be well-suited in the run-of-the-mill role of the therapist. Moving away from the quality of the acting itself, Kevin Thomas of Los Angeles Times believed the film failed primarily due to Young's writing and direction. One of his major criticisms was that information about Maria's character is mentioned by the other leading characters instead of the viewer discovering it through the film's plot. Another point Thomas raises is the fact that there is considerable imbalance on the level of graphic depiction of sex scenes based on gender participation. Even though the film has extensive sex scenes involving a female character (Maria) and a male character (Joseph), he pointed out that it became conservative when it came to equivalent scenes between two male characters (Joseph and Baltazar).

What critics agreed on was that the film has a plethora of erotic scenes, so much so that it could be mistaken for educational or academic manual about sex. Despite varying opinions on the film overall, it was generally acknowledged by critics that the topic addressed in the film is very important. On the review aggregator website Rotten Tomatoes, 50% of 14 critics' reviews are positive.

=== Box office ===
The film screened on the weekend of June 6–8 in the United States, making $54,547 in that first weekend of its release. Ultimately, it grossed $294,064.

== Controversy ==
Significant controversy arose regarding the film's rating, due to the extensive erotic scenes and strong sex related dialogue as well as the rather novel (at the time) topic it negotiates. As a result, it was initially assigned an NC-17 rating by the Motion Picture Association of America which was strongly contested by Young. After a lengthy process of numerous re-submissions to the MPAA and arguing his case in front of a special appeals board, the film was eventually released with an R rating in the American theaters. The final version of the film suffered several scene omissions and script edits.
