= Unknown Man No. 89 =

1977 novel by Elmore Leonard

Unknown Man #89
- First edition
- Author: Elmore Leonard
- Language: English
- Genre: Crime novel
- Publisher: Delacorte Press
- Publication date: May 1977
- Publication place: United States
- Media type: Print (Hardback)
- Pages: 264 pages
- ISBN: 0-440-09216-7
- OCLC: 2425395
- Dewey Decimal: 813/.5/4
- LC Class: PZ4.L58 Un PS3562.E55
- Preceded by: Swag

Unknown Man #89 is a crime novel written by Elmore Leonard, published in 1977, just after his novel Swag, and preceding The Hunted. It is a sequel to The Big Bounce.

== Plot summary ==
Detroit process server Jack Ryan (no relation to Tom Clancy's character of the same name) has a reputation for finding men who don't want to be found. A string of seemingly unrelated crimes leads Ryan to the search for a missing stockholder known only as "unknown man #89," but his missing man isn't "unknown" to everyone: a pretty blonde hates his guts, and a very nasty dude named Virgil Royal wants him dead in the worst way. This is very unfortunate for Jack, who is suddenly caught in the crossfire of a lethal triple-cross and becomes as much a target as his nameless prey. Along the way, Ryan butts heads with local police, including six-shooter-carrying Dick Speed. The book is perhaps best remembered for a sequence taken straight from The Godfather, where thug Virgil plants a shotgun in the meeting place of his victim, in this case, the fire escape of Bobby Lear's hotel room. Also of note is homosexual wannabe gangster Lonnie, whose "superfly" haircut was emulated by several of Elmore Leonard's other characters.

== Notes ==
According to the revised edition of "Hitchcock" by François Truffaut, Alfred Hitchcock was seriously considering adapting Leonard's novel Unknown Man No. 89, to which he had acquired the rights, as his follow-up film to Family Plot (1976), his 53rd and final project. He abandoned that idea and considered some other novels, but in 1978 Hitchcock closed his offices and dismissed his staff. There never was a 54th film. In 1980 Hitchcock died.

Leonard said Hitchcock paid him $100,000 for the novel.
