= Williams–Brice Stadium =

American football stadium in Columbia, South Carolina, United States

- Willy B The Cockpit
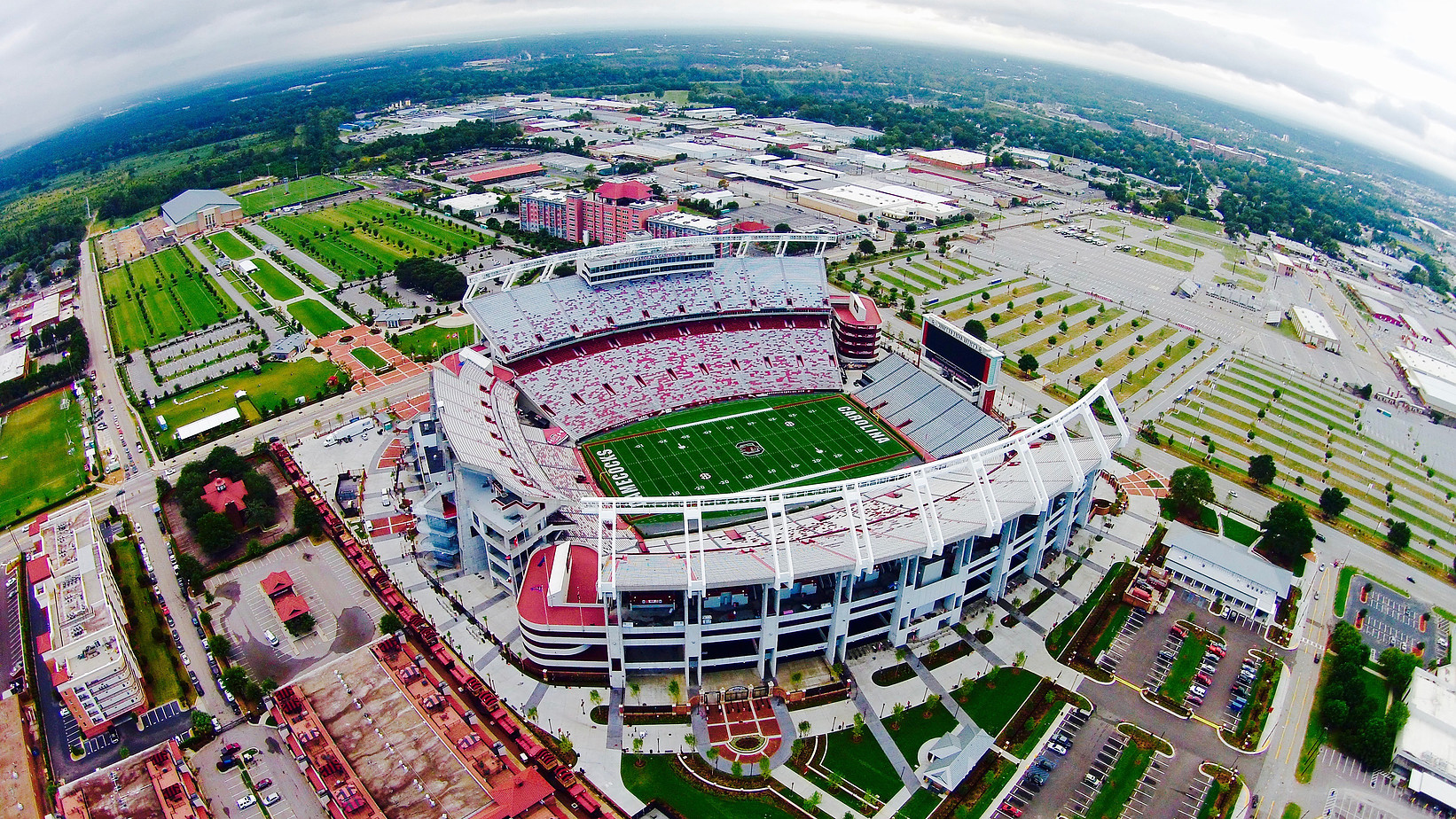
- The stadium in 2015

- Location in South Carolina Location in the United States
- Former names: Columbia Municipal Stadium (1934–1940); Carolina Stadium (1941–1972)
- Location: 1174 George Rogers Boulevard; Columbia, South Carolina 29201
- Coordinates: 33°58′23″N 81°1′9″W
- Capacity: 77,559 (2020–present) Former capacity List: 17,600 (1934–1948); 34,000 (1949–1956); 42,517 (1957–1959); 43,099 (1960–1962); 43,232 (1963–1965); 42,238 (1966–1970); 56,140 (1971); 53,865 (1972–1973); 54,564 (1974–1981); 72,400 (1982–1995); 80,250 (1996–2019)
- Surface: Grass (1934–1969, 1984–Present); AstroTurf (1970–1983)
- Record attendance: 85,199 (October 6, 2012 vs University of Georgia)

Construction
- Groundbreaking: May 14, 1934
- Opened: October 6, 1934
- Renovated: 1970, 1996, 2008, 2012, 2020
- Expanded: 1949, 1957, 1972, 1982, 1997
- Cost: $113,086 ($2.72 million in 2025 dollars) $30 million (renovations)
- Architects: Robert L. Sumwalt; JHS Architecture (renovations)

Tenants
- South Carolina Gamecocks (NCAA) (1934–present)

Website
- gamecocksonline.com/stadium

Williams–Brice Stadium is a football stadium located in Columbia, South Carolina, United States. It serves primarily as the home of the South Carolina Gamecocks football team, but has also been the site of many concerts, state high school football championships, and various other events, including the annual Palmetto Capital City Classic between the Benedict Tigers and the South Carolina State Bulldogs until the last game in 2005. It is currently the 16th largest on-campus college football stadium in the NCAA and is located on the corner of George Rogers Boulevard and Bluff Road adjacent to the South Carolina State Fairgrounds. Carolina football teams consistently attract standing-room-only crowds to Williams–Brice Stadium. The atmosphere on game days has been voted "the best" by SECsports.com, and has been noted as being among the loudest environments to play in by opposing players. (Note: Sources:)

== History ==
The stadium was originally built in 1934 with help of federal Works Progress Administration funds as Columbia Municipal Stadium. It was built to replace Melton Field, an aging wooden structure that was located where USC's Thomas Cooper Library stands today. All USC football games except for the annual Thanksgiving matchup with Clemson had been played at Melton Field. The Clemson game was played at the South Carolina fairgrounds at the location that became Williams–Brice Stadium. Williams–Brice originally seated 17,600 people in what roughly corresponds to the lower level of the current facility's east and west grandstand seats. In 1941, the stadium was deeded to USC and renamed Carolina Stadium.

One end of the stadium was filled in during the 1940s, turning it into a horseshoe. Capacity was almost doubled, to 34,000. More than a decade later, the other end was filled in, turning the stadium into a bowl. Capacity increased to 43,000.

Williams–Brice Stadium was sold out prior to the start of each of the last seven college football seasons and consistently ranks in the top 20 in average attendance and the top 15 in total attendance. For the 2008 season, the stadium was 17th in average attendance and 13th in total attendance.

On October 6, 2012, the stadium's single-game attendance record was set when 85,199 fans watched the #6 Gamecocks beat #5 Georgia by the score of 35–7.

The stadium is considered one of the loudest venues in the country by both opposing players and college football pundits, with Josh Pate of 247Sports noting that "when it's 3rd down and three in Williams-Brice Stadium, you can't hear anything [...] South Carolina fans more than do their part on game day to make that place a really, really intimidating environment". During a game against Florida in 2001, ESPN announcers indicated that they had to shout to hear each other's comments inside the press box.

ESPN's GameDay crew has broadcast its show four times (2001, 2004, 2005, 2006) from the State Fairgrounds across the street from the stadium. (In 2010, 2012, and 2014, GameDay was broadcast from The Horseshoe on campus.) ESPN also used a photo of the stadium in its advertising to promote its GameDay show throughout the 2005 college football season. On September 14, 2024 (vs. LSU) ESPN's College Game Day broadcast from the newly renovated Gamecock Park area across Bluff Road from the stadium. Pat McAfee made several comments about the crowd's enthusiasm.

=== Renovations ===
The stadium's first major renovation began in 1970, when the grass surface was replaced with AstroTurf. From 1971 to 1972, the west grandstand was completely rebuilt, with the addition of an upper deck. Capacity increased to 54,000. The renovation was funded by the estate of Martha Williams Brice and Thomas Hardin Brice, who left some of their estate to USC for stadium renovation and expansion. Martha Williams Brice was a member of the family who owned Williams Furniture Corporation in Sumter, South Carolina, and for whom the furniture company was named. Her late husband, Thomas Hardin Brice, played football for the Gamecocks from 1922 to 1924. In their honor, the expanded stadium was officially renamed Williams–Brice Stadium on September 8, 1972, by a bequeath from their nephews Tom and Phil Edwards.

In 1982, the east grandstands were finally double-decked, increasing capacity to 72,400. However, unlike the west grandstand, the east grandstand was never rebuilt, and is the only remaining portion of the original 1934 structure. During the 1983–84 offseason, at the urging of new coach Joe Morrison, the university removed the AstroTurf and replaced it with natural grass.

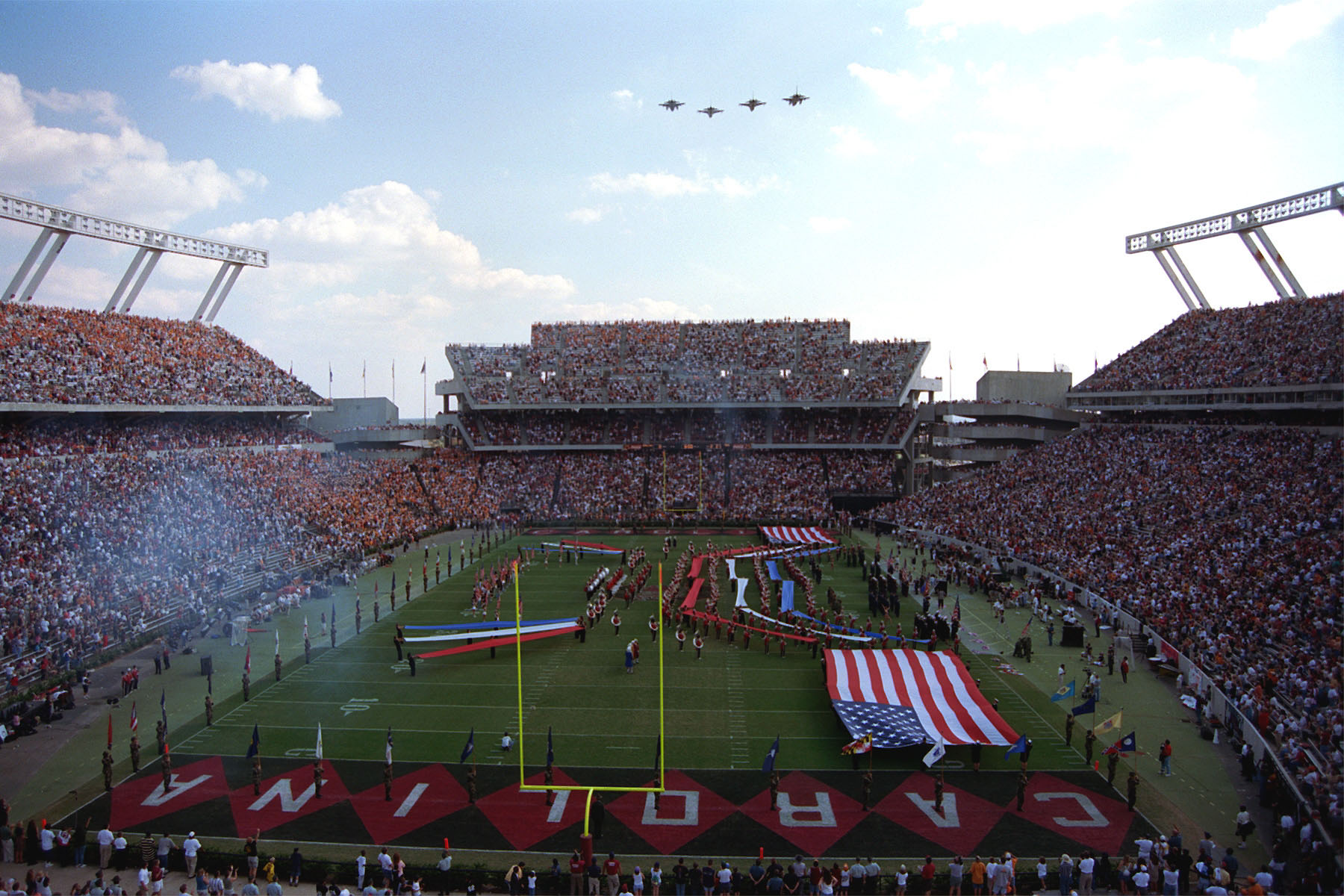
Flyover at South Carolina game, 1998

Over the last 10 years, nearly $30 million of renovations and improvements have taken place at Williams–Brice Stadium, bringing the official capacity to 80,250. The addition of the upper deck in the south end zone includes "The Zone," which is an 11,000-square-foot (1,000 m^{2}) banquet facility located in a prime seating location. The box seats, executive suites, and athletic training facilities at the stadium have also been upgraded. Just prior to the 2008 football season the stadium underwent a complete upgrade to the main sound system. During this upgrade the school added a large array of subwoofers under the scoreboard to enhance the "feel" of their entrance music (the theme song to 2001: A Space Odyssey). Installation of this system was done by local Columbia company ACS Sound and Lighting.

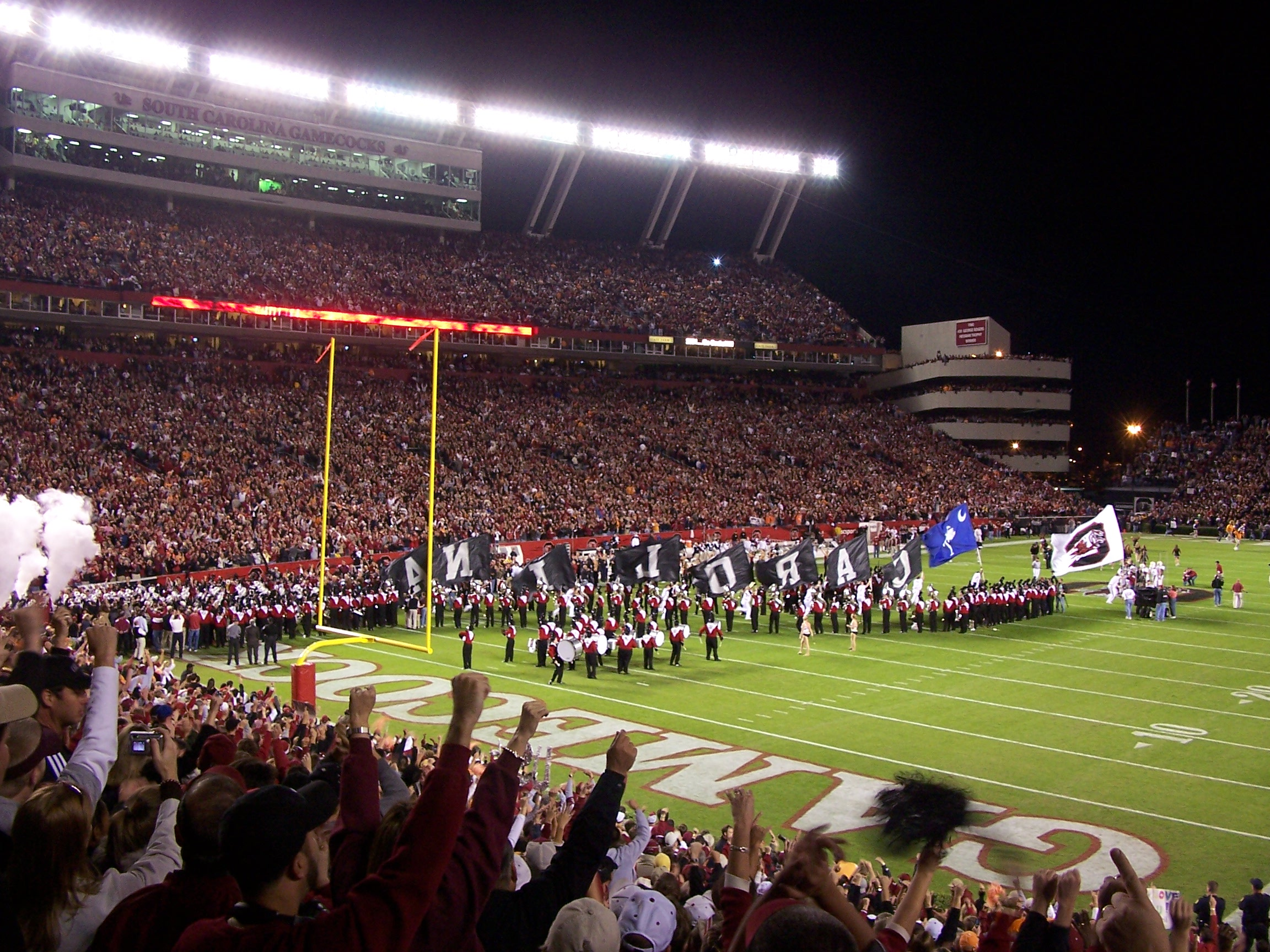
Carolina takes the field to Also sprach Zarathustra (from 2001: A Space Odyssey) at Williams–Brice Stadium, rated the best entrance in college football by The Sporting News, 2006

To open the 2012 season, the stadium featured a new Daktronics 36 foot high by 124 foot wide high definition video board, the 3rd largest in the SEC. Also unveiled was a new 52 acre tailgating area, landscaped with over 650 trees and featuring a 100 foot wide pathway, called the "Garnet Way", that the team, band, and cheerleaders now walk through as they enter the stadium.

In 2015, the surface parking lot surrounding the stadium was replaced with a landscaped promenade named "Springs Brooks Plaza", named for the family of Robert H. Brooks. The project included a half-mile of ornamental fencing, planting of 340 trees, and the installation of 220 light poles and 38 benches. Also added were a restroom building and a 12,000-square-foot structure housing ticket sales and a merchandise store in addition to a command center for EMS and police. The project expanded the number of ticket windows from five to eight, enlarged the student entrance and relocated parking for television trucks to improve the flow of pedestrian traffic. In 2020, three club areas were renovated, lowering capacity for the 2020 season to 77,559. In 2022, 250+ LED stadium lights with the capability to display multiple colors were installed. In addition, an expansion of the west main concourse, new elevators and new ribbon display boards were also a part of stadium renovations for that year.

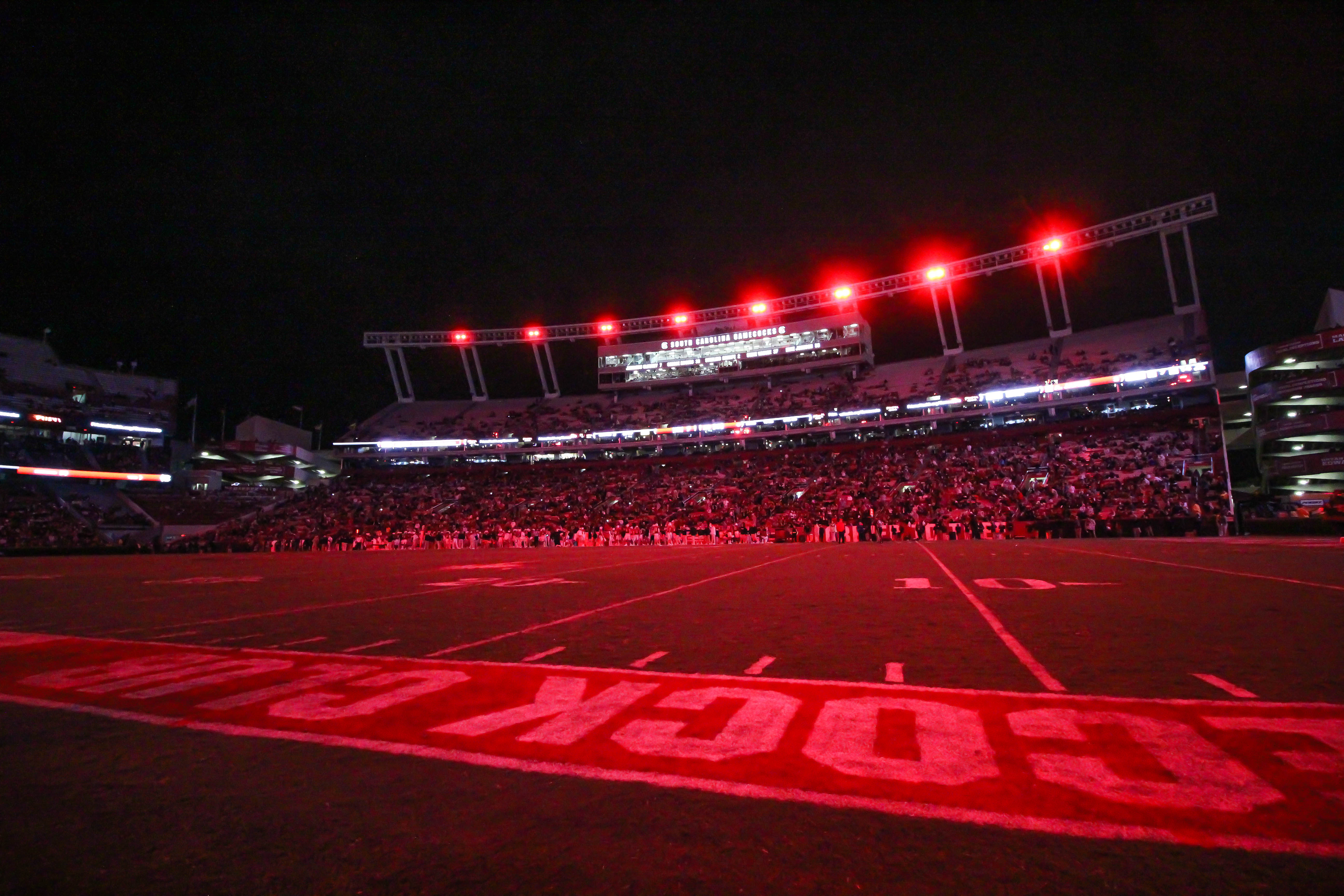
William Brice Stadium at Night in 2022

In 2025, it was announced that the stadium would be undergoing a massive renovation through the 2028 football season, focused on adding premium seats and areas, as well as improving the general gameday experience. Due to the removal of the top ten rows on the west side of the stadium for the installation of premium suites, the overall capacity of the stadium is expected to fall by around 4,100.

== "If it ain't swayin', we ain't playin'" ==
The new east upper deck created some controversy during the 1983 season. Fans reported it was noticeably swaying—as much as a foot by some accounts. The swaying was especially pronounced during a game in which the Gamecocks routed Southern Cal 38–14. Joe Morrison was subsequently quoted as saying, "If it ain't swayin', we ain't playin'"—a phrase that eventually made it onto bumper stickers and other items, and is still a popular saying today. Giant shock absorbers were installed under the east upper deck for the 1987 season; however, during the 1988 season, many spectators reported seeing a ripple effect across the east upper deck when the marching band played the song "Louie Louie." The university indicated that the sway or ripple was safe. To this day, the east upper deck still sways when fans jump up and down. In addition, several parts of the stadium have been known to vibrate due to the decibel levels generated during a typical game.

== Notable games ==
The Gamecocks won their first game at the stadium in 1934, beating Erskine 25–0, and have compiled an overall record at the stadium of 324–211-14 (including a homecoming record of 46–32) through the 2025 college football season. Some of the biggest wins for the Gamecock football program occurred at the stadium, including:

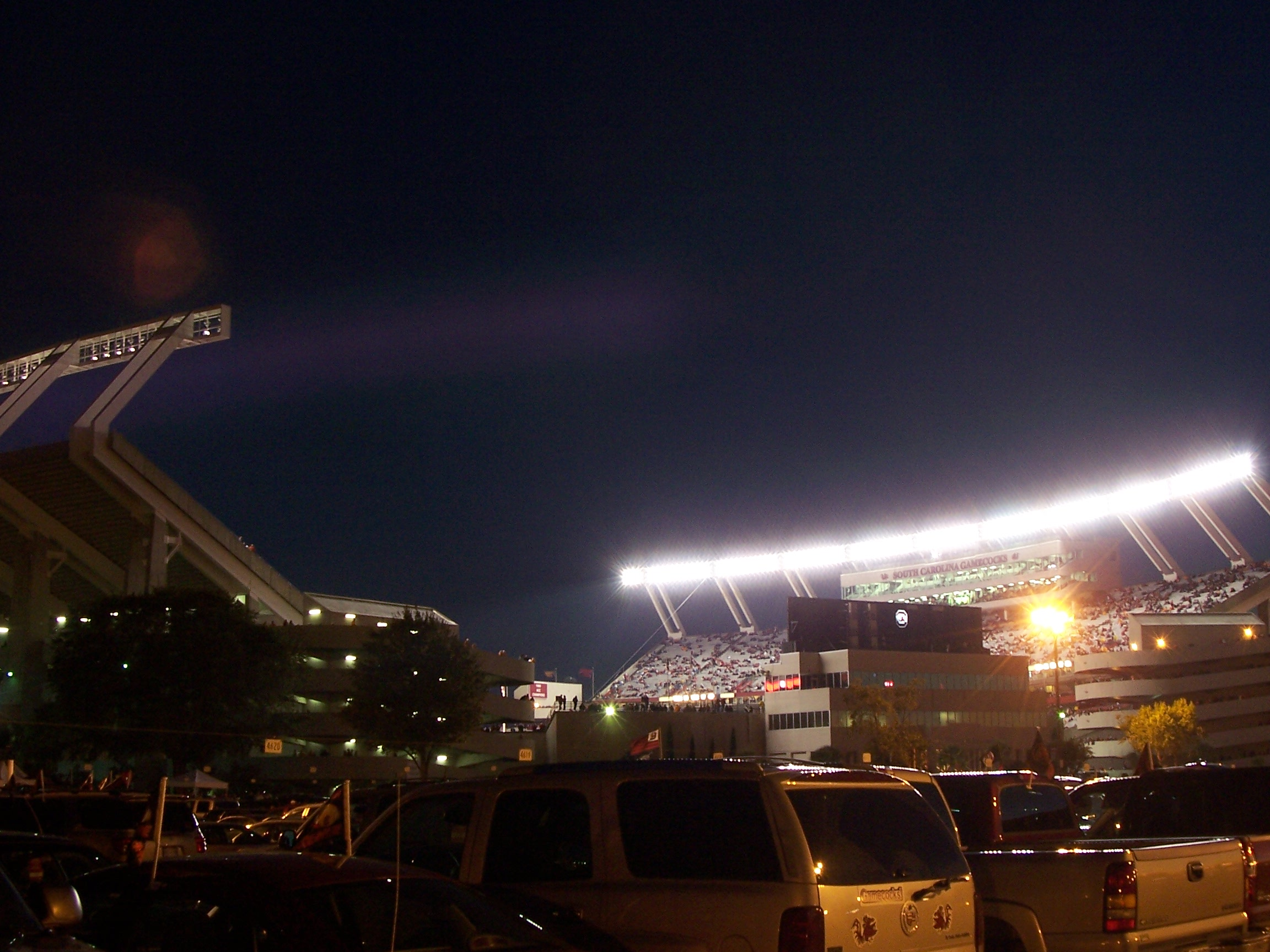
Williams–Brice Stadium at night

- November 22, 1975 – South Carolina beat Clemson 56–20 to set a team record for most points scored in a game against Clemson (South Carolina's in-state rival).
- September 13, 1980 – South Carolina beat Wichita State 73–0 to set a team record for largest margin of victory.
- October 1, 1983 – South Carolina beat Southern California 38–14 to win its first game ever against the Trojans (the second and last meeting of these teams).
- November 10, 1984 – #5 South Carolina beat #11 Florida State 38–26 to move up to #2 in the college football polls (the highest ranking ever achieved by the Gamecock football program).
- November 21, 1987 – #12 South Carolina beat #8 Clemson 20–7 to win on national television with the highest combined rankings of the two programs entering the game.
- October 31, 1992 – South Carolina beat #16 Tennessee 24–23 to win its first game ever against the Volunteers.
- October 7, 1995 – South Carolina beat Kent State 77–14 to set a team record for most points scored in a game against any opponent.
- September 9, 2000 – South Carolina beat #10 Georgia 21–10 to snap an 18-game losing streak in the SEC.
- September 29, 2001 – #15 South Carolina beat Alabama 37–36 to win its first game ever against the Crimson Tide.
- November 12, 2005 – South Carolina beat #12 Florida 30–22 to win its first game against the Gators since joining the SEC.
- October 4, 2007 – #11 South Carolina beat #8 Kentucky 38–23 on a Thursday night nationally televised ESPN game, winning its first game over a top 10 SEC team.
- September 24, 2009 – South Carolina beat #4 Ole Miss 16–10 on a Thursday night nationally televised ESPN game, winning its first game over a top 5 team at Williams–Brice. (USC beat #3 North Carolina 31–13 in Chapel Hill, NC on October 24, 1981.) This game also marked the debut of Sandstorm at Gamecock Athletic Events.
- November 28, 2009 – South Carolina beat #15 Clemson 34–17 on ESPN; the Tigers went on to lose the ACC Championship against Georgia Tech the following week, 34–39.
- October 9, 2010 – #19 South Carolina beat #1 Alabama 35–21 on CBS; beating the top ranked team in the country for the first time in school history and for the first time, winning a SEC on CBS game (the team had previously won the 1995 Carquest Bowl, which aired on CBS). ESPN Gameday was hosted at South Carolina on the Horseshoe for this game.
- October 6, 2012 – #6 South Carolina beat #5 Georgia 35–7 on ESPN; the game was the first time Carolina, as a Top-10 team, beat another Top-10 team. ESPN Gameday was hosted at South Carolina on the Horseshoe for this game.
- November 30, 2013 – #10 South Carolina beat #6 Clemson 31–17. This game was the fifth-consecutive win against Clemson for the Gamecocks.
- October 22, 2022 - South Carolina beat Texas A&M 30–24. This game was the first time South Carolina had beaten the Aggies since they joined the SEC in the 2014 season. South Carolina also obtained their first four-game winning streak since 2013.
- November 19, 2022 – South Carolina beat #5 Tennessee 63–38 on ESPN. The Gamecocks scored the most points against a top-five team as an unranked team in the history of the AP poll.

Top-ten crowds at Williams–Brice Stadium

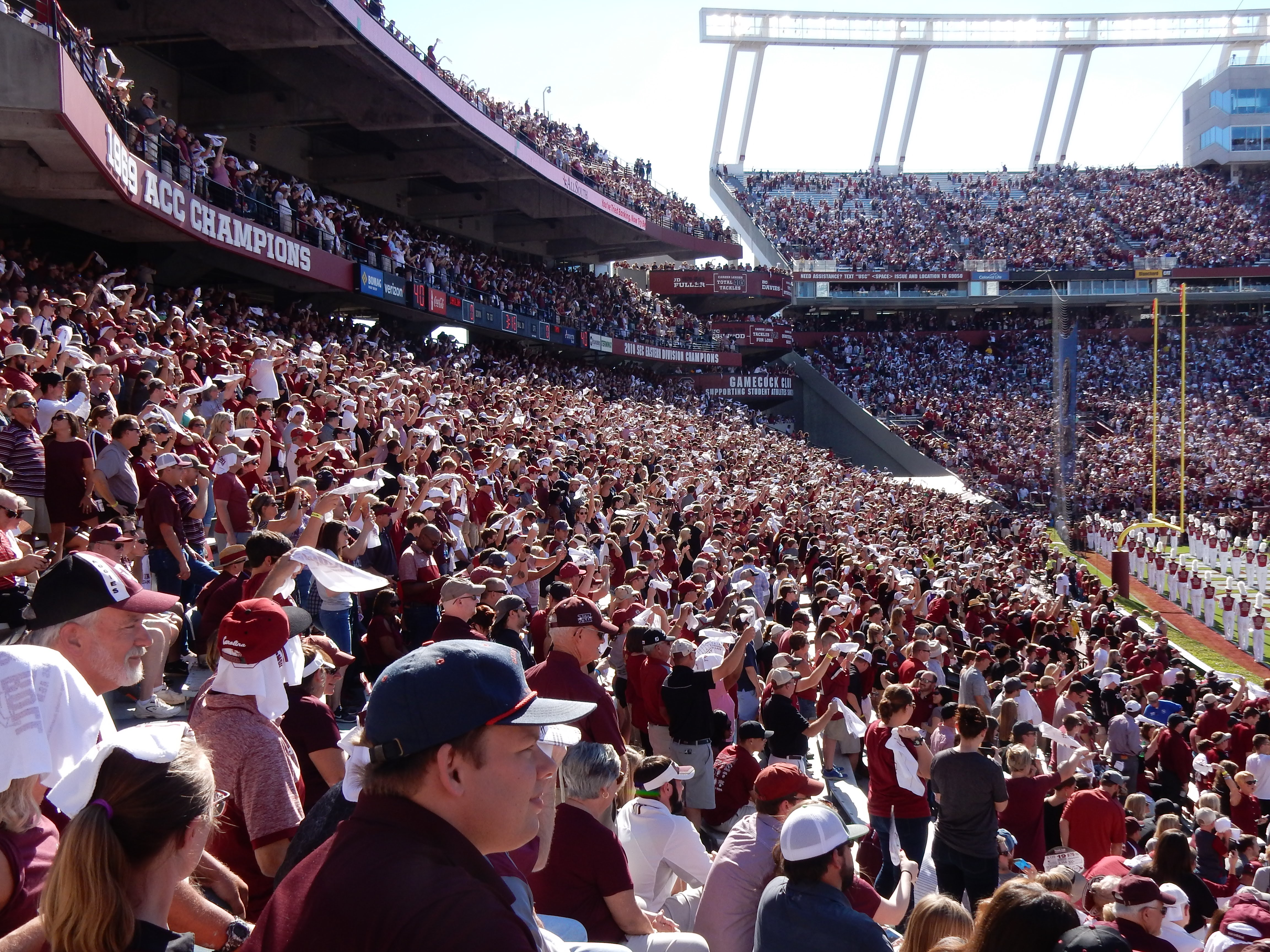
Williams–Brice Stadium in 2016

Date	Opponent	Score	Attendance
October 6, 2012	Georgia	35–7	85,199
November 17, 2001	Clemson	20–15	85,000
October 11, 2001	Florida	17–54	84,900
September 11, 2004	Georgia	16–20	84,300
September 13, 2014	Georgia	38–35	84,232
September 14, 2002	Georgia	7–13	84,227
October 28, 2000	Tennessee	14–17	84,200
November 30, 2013	Clemson	31–17	84,174
September 29, 2001	Alabama	37–36	84,100
November 22, 2003	Clemson	17–63	83,987

== Other uses ==
=== Pro football ===
On August 30, 1990, the Chicago Bears beat the Buffalo Bills 35–7 in an NFL preseason game.

In 1995, the Carolina Panthers of the NFL proposed Williams–Brice Stadium as their original home while their permanent stadium was under construction in Charlotte, North Carolina. However, athletic director Mike McGee nixed the idea when he noted that the Gamecocks should be the only major football team in town. Despite the overwhelmingly negative public reaction to his comments, McGee maintained that he was acting in the best interest of the Gamecocks.

=== Soccer ===
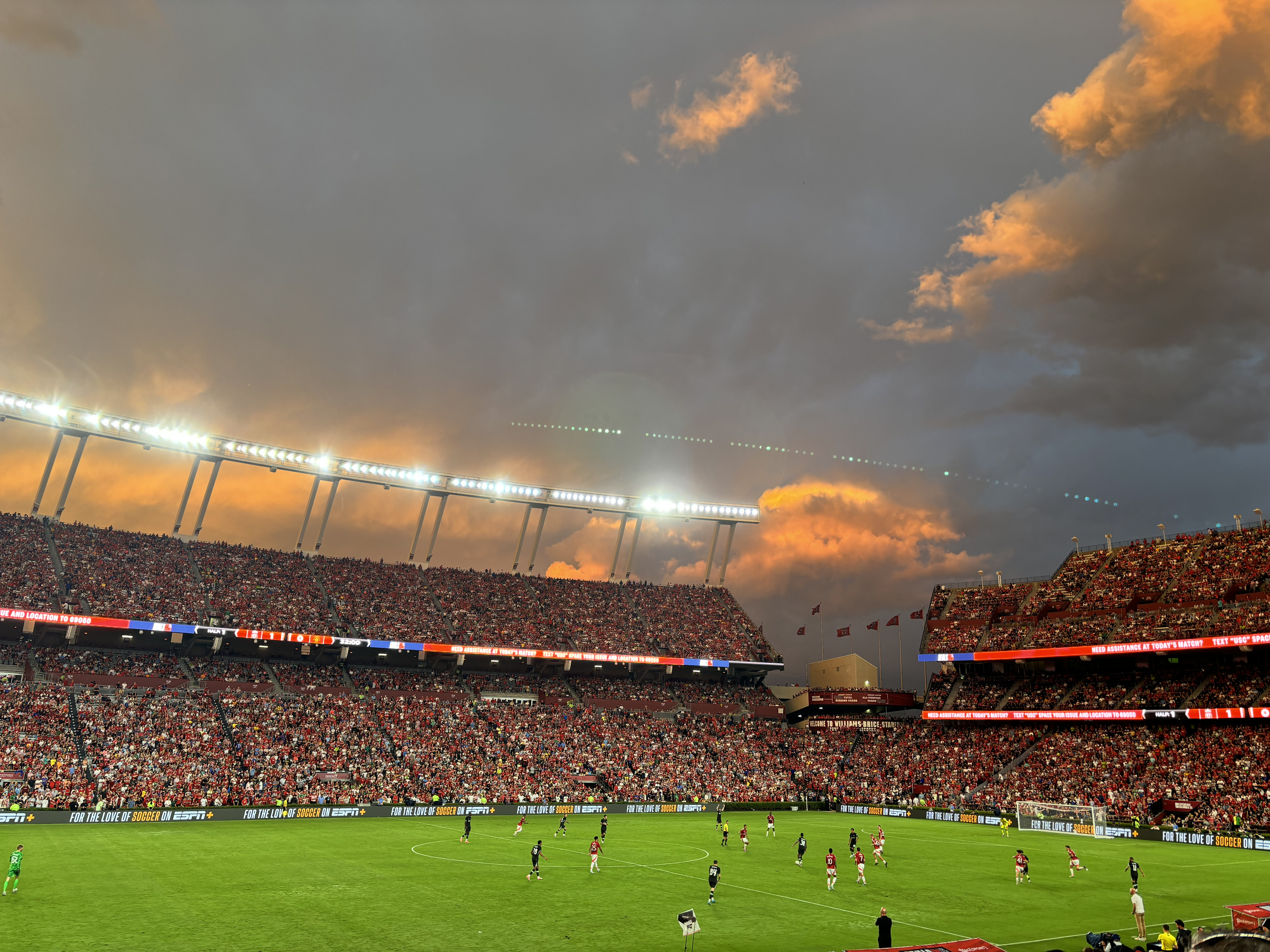
Liverpool vs. Manchester United, August 2024

Liverpool beat Manchester United 3–0 at the stadium on August 3, 2024, as part of a Premier League preseason tour across the United States.

=== Concerts ===
Metallica and Guns N' Roses performed at the stadium during their co-headlining Guns N' Roses/Metallica Stadium Tour on September 7, 1992, with Faith No More as their opening act.

On September 23, 1992, Irish rock band U2 performed at Williams–Brice Stadium with Public Enemy on the third leg of their Zoo TV Tour.

On May 7, 1993, Paul McCartney and his band performed at Williams–Brice Stadium on the North American leg of The New World Tour.

On September 25, 1994, British rock legends The Rolling Stones performed at Williams–Brice Stadium with Blind Melon during the first leg of their Voodoo Lounge Tour.

A string of natural disasters hit in 1996, including a drought in the Great Plains and Hurricane Bertha in the Carolinas dealt substantial blows to family farm income and made it harder than ever for farmers to make a living from their land. Farm Aid coordinated a farmer to farmer haylift in which farmers from the Carolinas sent hay out to drought-stricken farmers in Texas and Oklahoma. Farm Aid '96 was held in Columbia, South Carolina. As Farm Aid founder Willie Nelson stated at the news conference, "We are proud to hold Farm Aid '96 in Columbia, South Carolina, a region with a rich agricultural tradition and hard working men and women who struggle every day to make a living on the land. We hope this concert will remind the nation that we need to change the way we think about the food we eat and the people who grow it. It's important that we have someone there growing the food who cares for the land." The concert took place on October 12 and included Columbia's own Hootie and the Blowfish (who jammed onstage with Willie), Neil Young, the Beach Boys, John Mellencamp, Tim McGraw, Martina McBride, Deana Carter, Grand Ole Opry star John Conlee, Rusted Root, and Jewel. Once again, TNN: The Nashville Network, televised the show.

On April 21, 2001, George Strait played to 39,442 fans at Williams–Brice with opening acts Alan Jackson, Lonestar, Lee Ann Womack, and Brad Paisley.

On April 26, 2008, Knoxville native Kenny Chesney played there with Brooks & Dunn, LeAnn Rimes, and Gary Allan as part of his Poets and Pirates Tour. Chesney started his Poets and Pirates Tour at Williams–Brice Stadium. During the introduction of his set, his boot got caught between a hydraulic lift and the lip of the stage surface, which crushed his foot.

On August 21, 2018, Beyoncé and Jay-Z performed at the venue with DJ Khaled and Chloe x Halle for the North American leg of their On the Run II Tour. The concert attracted over 38,000 fans.

=== In film ===
In 1993, the stadium was the setting for The Program, a college football movie starring James Caan, Halle Berry, Omar Epps, Craig Sheffer, and Kristy Swanson. The stadium was also featured in overhead footage for the final scene in the 1998 football comedy, The Waterboy.

=== Other events ===
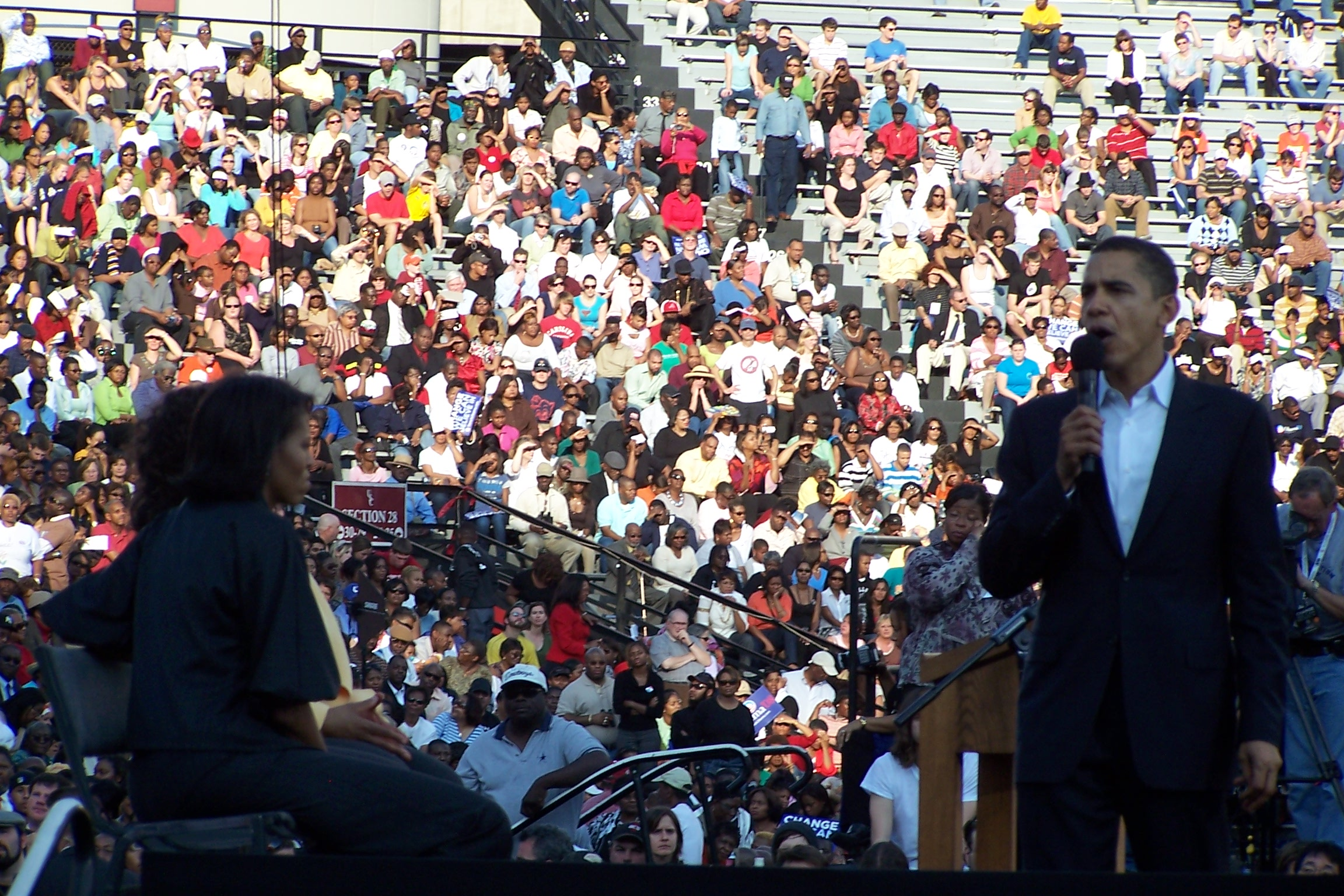
Barack Obama at Williams–Brice Stadium on December 9, 2007

In 1987, Pope John Paul II, during a Papal visit to Columbia, spoke in front of 60,000 people at the stadium. That same year Billy Graham held his South Carolina crusade at the stadium.

Promise Keepers held one of their ministries at Williams-Brice on October 2–3, 1998.

In December 2007, Barack Obama attracted approximately 29,000 attendees to a presidential primary campaign stop. Also present was his wife Michelle Obama and Oprah Winfrey.

== Traditions ==
Popular game day traditions include:

- The playing of the "Dawn" section of Also sprach Zarathustra, the theme from 2001: A Space Odyssey, as the Gamecocks run onto the field at the start of every game, which Sporting News called "the most exciting pregame entry" in college football.
- The playing of the Darude song "Sandstorm" before the opening kickoff and after Gamecock touchdowns, leading the crowd into a frenzy, often even causing the press box to noticeably shake. Beginning in the 2022–23 season, this is accompanied by an LED light show.
- Nationally recognized mascot, Cocky, roaming around the stadium throughout games with his trademark spirit and attitude. Cocky's "Magic Box" entrance at Williams–Brice Stadium is one of the many things that Cocky does to fire up the fans. Cocky won the UCA (Universal Cheerleading Association) Mascot Championship in 1986 and 1994. Cocky was also selected as the Capital One National Mascot of the Year for 2003.
- Fans joining in on many cheers and chants, including the popular "GAME" (shouted by the west side of the stadium) followed by "COCKS" (shouted by the east side).
- Fans singing and dancing to "Go Carolina," "USC Fight Song," various renditions of "2001," and many other songs played by The University of South Carolina Marching Band. As one of the most well-known college bands in the country, the 375-member "Mighty Sound of the Southeast" continually performs music featuring guard, percussion, and dance units.
- The fireworks from the scoreboard and "rooster crow" played over the loudspeakers when the Gamecocks score. During night games, this is accompanied by a strobe-like flicker of the LED stadium lights.
- Tailgating is a favorite pastime for fans attending games at Williams–Brice, and many tailgaters consider pre-games at the stadium as one of the best atmospheres in the nation. The grounds around the stadium, including the State Fairgrounds, provide plenty of real estate for tailgating. Many clubs have also bought private property in the area and erected tailgating shelters. In 1990, a unique form of tailgating called the Cockaboose Railroad arrived in Columbia. 22 immovable cabooses line an unused railroad track behind the south end of the stadium, and each Cockaboose provides private party space and cable television. There are also 18 additional cabooses and 4 passenger cars farther away from the stadium. Four condominium developments recently built around the stadium also cater primarily to Carolina football fans along with several tailgate pavilions with permanently deeded spaces.
- The band plays the Alma Mater at the end of every football game and is the last song to be played in Williams–Brice until the next game.

== See also ==
- List of NCAA Division I FBS football stadiums
