= Freedom (2014 film) =

- Directed by: Peter Cousens
- Written by: Timothy A. Chey; John Senczuk
- Produced by: Peter Cousens; Timothy A. Chey; Michael Goodin; Sheila Rabizadeh
- Starring: Cuba Gooding Jr. William Sadler; Sharon Leal
- Cinematography: Dean Cundey
- Edited by: Ray Hubley
- Music by: James Lavino
- Production company: Production One
- Distributed by: ARC Entertainment
- Release dates: August 21, 2014 (Australia); April 5, 2015 (United States)
- Running time: 94 minutes
- Country: United States
- Language: English

Freedom is an American film directed by Peter Cousens, starring Cuba Gooding Jr., William Sadler and Sharon Leal.

The film tells two stories in parallel. The first is the escape of a pre-Civil War Black family from slavery in Virginia to freedom in Canada, helped by the Underground Railroad, devout Quakers, and Frederick Douglass. The second story is the travel of an ancestor from Africa (Gambia) to a British colony in the New World (South Carolina).

== Cast ==
- Cuba Gooding Jr. as Samuel Woodward
- Bernhard Forcher as John Newton
- William Sadler as Plimpton
- Sharon Leal as Vanessa
- David Rasche as Jefferson Monroe
- Terrence Mann as Barney Fagan
- Jubilant Sykes as Ozias
- Michael Goodwin as Garrett
- Diane Salinger as Fanny
- Anna Sims as Mary
