= Sizzle (1981 film) =

- Genre: Drama
- Written by: Richard Carr; Clyde Ware
- Directed by: Don Medford
- Starring: Loni Anderson; Leslie Uggams; Roy Thinnes
- Theme music composer: Artie Butler
- Country of origin: United States
- Original language: English

Production
- Executive producers: Aaron Spelling; Douglas S. Cramer
- Producers: Cindy Dunne; Lynn Loring
- Cinematography: Archie R. Dalzell
- Editor: George W. Brooks
- Running time: 104 minutes
- Production company: Aaron Spelling Productions

Original release
- Network: ABC
- Release: November 29, 1981

Sizzle is a 1981 American made-for-television drama film starring Loni Anderson, Leslie Uggams and Roy Thinnes.

== Plot ==
During Prohibition, a woman avenges her boyfriend's murder.

== Cast ==
- Loni Anderson as Julie Davis
- Leslie Uggams as Vonda
- Roy Thinnes as Wheeler
- Richard Lynch as Johnny O'Brien
- Michael Goodwin as Danny Clark
- Phyllis Davis as Sally
- Michael V. Gazzo as Tripoli
- John Forsythe as Mike Callahan
- Richard Bright as Corky
- Martine Bartlett as Freda
- Robert Costanzo as Al Capone
- Arnie Moore as Boggs

== Production ==
Loni Anderson says she based her performance on her grandmother. She says producer Aaron Spelling had the script for a while but was unable to find a star; he cast Anderson after seeing her play a dual role on The Love Boat.

== Reception ==
The Los Angeles Times called it "turgid".
