= Looker =

1981 film by Michael Crichton

- Theatrical release poster
- Directed by: Michael Crichton
- Written by: Michael Crichton
- Produced by: Howard Jeffrey
- Starring: Albert Finney; James Coburn; Susan Dey; Leigh Taylor-Young
- Cinematography: Paul Lohmann
- Edited by: Carl Kress
- Music by: Barry De Vorzon
- Production company: The Ladd Company
- Distributed by: Warner Bros.
- Release date: October 30, 1981
- Running time: 94 minutes
- Country: United States
- Language: English
- Budget: $8–12 million
- Box office: $3.3 million

Looker is a 1981 American science fiction thriller film written and directed by Michael Crichton, starring Albert Finney, James Coburn, Susan Dey, and Leigh Taylor-Young. It follows a series of mysterious deaths plaguing female models who have had cosmetic surgery done by a renowned Los Angeles physician. The film explores media, advertising and television's impact on the public in creating a ridiculous standard of beauty.

Though sparse in visual effects, the film is notable for being the first commercial film to attempt to make a realistic computer-generated character, for the model named Cindy. It was also the first film to create three-dimensional (3D) shading with a computer, months before the release of the better-known Tron.

== Plot ==
Dr. Larry Roberts, a renowned Beverly Hills plastic surgeon, performs cosmetic procedures on a clientele mainly consisting of female television models. Lisa Convey, one of his patients, falls into a trance state in her apartment after being exposed to a flash of light, unaware of the presence of a man lurking in her closet. She falls from her balcony moments later in what is suspected by police to be a suicide.

Lieutenant Masters questions Roberts at his office, where his secretary finds that several medical records—including Lisa's—have mysteriously vanished. After Masters departs, patient Cindy Fairmont visits for a final follow-up appointment, followed by Tina Cassidy. A disturbed Tina begs Roberts to return her to her original appearance, claiming that the "perfect" models in the city are being murdered. As Tina departs, she leaves behind her purse, which contains a document from Digital Matrix Inc. (DMI). When Roberts attempts to return the purse to Tina, he sees a flash of light in her apartment window, and she too falls to her death. Roberts sees a man on her balcony, but he disappears.

Fearing for Cindy's safety, Roberts invites her to join him for a fundraising dinner held by billionaire businessman John Reston, who introduces Roberts to the head of DMI, Jennifer Long. She explains that DMI used women's facial measurements for a visual technology experiment that was recently ended. Roberts then brings Cindy back to his residence and, despite her expectation of a romantic encounter, has her sleep in the guest room. The next day, Roberts accompanies Cindy to the filming of a television commercial where DMI technicians monitor the set using a computer. When Cindy is unable to hit her marks, the DMI technicians inform her that the commercial will be completed using CGI which will require Cindy to visit DMI.

As Cindy undergoes a 3D body scan at the DMI laboratory, Jennifer tests Roberts' eyes with the computer. His point of focus is shown to be on the model rather than the products advertised. Jennifer divulges that, after surgery, Cindy and other models were assessed as visually "perfect" by the computer in still photos, but their scores were inconsistent while in motion. Roberts notices flashes of light from the "Looker" lab which Jennifer claims her security card will not allow them to enter. Roberts steals a security card from a technician before departing with Cindy and the theft is reported to Reston.

While Cindy is visiting her parents, Roberts is exposed to a series of light flashes by the man from Tina's balcony after which hours pass without his awareness. When Cindy returns that night, the two drive to DMI and enter using the security card to breach the Looker lab. Roberts learns that Looker stands for "light ocular-oriented kinetic emotive responses" which uses high-intensity light to induce trances in those exposed. A man enters the Looker lab and attacks Roberts using the Looker gun. Roberts defends himself by using a pair of mirrored sunglasses to reflect the light, immobilizing the assailant.

Later, Reston orders the man to abduct Cindy and murder Roberts. Arriving at Roberts's office, they kidnap Cindy. The next morning, Roberts is chased through the city by Reston's henchman, causing Roberts to crash his car, but he escapes. Roberts stows aboard a Reston Industries security car to infiltrate the company headquarters. Onstage for a gala demonstration, Reston introduces his company's newfound ability to create commercials using computer-generated actors. The audience is then mesmerized by Jennifer who is operating the computer from the room where she is holding Cindy. When Jennifer leaves the console, Reston's henchman kills her having mistaken her for Roberts. A struggle between Roberts and the henchman is ended by Reston shooting at Roberts and accidentally killing his own man. Lieutenant Masters, who has been following Roberts, arrives in time to kill Reston before he can shoot Roberts as Cindy and Larry leave.

== Cast ==
- Albert Finney as Dr. Larry Roberts
- James Coburn as John Reston
- Susan Dey as Cindy Fairmont
- Leigh Taylor-Young as Jennifer Long
- Dorian Harewood as Lieutenant Masters
- Tim Rossovich as the moustache man
- Darryl Hickman as Dr. Jim Belfield
- Terri Welles as Lisa Convey
- Terry Kiser as the commercial director
- Georgann Johnson as Cindy's mother
- Richard Venture as Cindy's father

== Production ==
Crichton started thinking about the subject of the film in 1975. He says he went to a Los Angeles computer company to find out how they could create copies in commercials without looking too ridiculous and discovered a company in Texas was already doing it, a process called tomography.

Looker became an early production of The Ladd Company. It was Leigh Taylor-Young's first film in eight years. Filming took place at the Goldwyn Studios, The Burbank Studios, and on location in the Los Angeles area.

In 1991, James Coburn said, "My part was pretty much on the cutting room floor. They really pissed that film away. They had Albert Finney running around in a security guard's uniform throughout the film. It didn't make any sense. It could have been a good picture. It was about how television controls. It was about how commercials manipulate people to buy products, politicians, whatever. But, they cut the film up for a television print. I don't know why they did that. They spent some bread on the picture too. It was a $12 million production. That's not much today, but back then it was a pretty big budget."

== Reception ==
Looker was poorly received by critics, particularly film historian Leonard Maltin, who wrote, "Intriguing premise is illogically and boringly mishandled; even Finney cannot save this turkey." On the review aggregator website Rotten Tomatoes, the film holds an approval rating of 32% based on 22 reviews, with an average rating of 4.5/10. It grossed $3.3 million in the United States and Canada.

== See also ==
- Max Headroom: 20 Minutes into the Future, a 1985 cyberpunk television film about television adverts and their subliminal effects on viewers
- Timeline of CGI in film and television
