= Williams Furniture Company =

American furniture company

In the mid-20th century, Williams Furniture Company was the largest employer in Sumter, South Carolina and the largest single-facility furniture company in the United States, housing all of its departments under one roof. Williams-Brice Stadium at the University of South Carolina is named for the Williams-Brice family for whom the furniture company was named.

== History ==
At the beginning of the 20th century, Sumter, South Carolina's economy was largely based on agriculture and cotton. In the 1920s, the boll weevil threatened South Carolina's cotton crops. As a result, Sumter's Board of Trade worked with consultants to determine how to best move forward in industry. Because Sumter's location provided easy access to railroad lines, timber, and sawmills, the consultants recommended that a furniture manufacturing business be established in Sumter.

In 1925, the Sumter community fundraised to establish a furniture manufacturing business, O.L. Williams Top and Panel Company. The company was named for Oliver Lafayette Williams, a Sumter resident with a history in the veneer business.

By 1928, the company was re-named Williams Furniture Corporation. The plant was supplied with wood from local hardwood mills. The company relied on a mixed-race workforce, with African American workers largely employed in unskilled jobs, operating machinery that did not require prior formal training. Williams Furniture Corporation was a wholesaler, supplying suites of furniture for department stores to sell to the public. Williams marketed their furniture with a showroom at the Southern Furniture Market in High Point, North Carolina. By 1945, Williams Furniture Corporation had furniture displays in Atlanta, Georgia, Chicago, Illinois, Dallas, Texas, and Los Angeles, California.

Early union efforts focused on increasing wages and improving working conditions at Williams Furniture Corporation. In 1933, workers at Williams Furniture held a brief strike for higher wages, which ended swiftly after direct negotiations with O.L. Williams. After 1933, the Williams Furniture union became affiliated with the Brotherhood of Carpenters and Joiners of America. In 1935, Williams Furniture and O.L. Williams Veneer workers held an eight day strike that was racially integrated.

In March 1936, a fire destroyed the original Williams Furniture plant on East Calhoun Street and operations moved to a larger building on Fulton Street.

By 1942, the union at Williams Furniture Corporation became affiliated with the United Furniture Workers of America (UFWA), a branch of the Congress of Industrial Organizations (CIO). The CIO was racially integrated, fitting the demographics of the 65% African American 1942 Williams Furniture workforce. In 1949, the UFWA at the state level investigated the Sumter union for sympathies to the communist party. In 1967, Williams Furniture merged with Georgia-Pacific, becoming the Williams Division of Georgia-Pacific. In the merger, Georgia-Pacific acquired Williams' “180,000 acres” of timber lands." During this period, the union at Williams Furniture organized protests for higher wages and civil rights. Coretta Scott King (Widow of Martin Luther King, Jr.) and Modjeska Simpkins took part in a 1975 march.

In 1983, Wall Street investor Webb Turner bought GP Williams.

In 1987, Vaughn-Bassett Furniture acquired the Sumter company, creating VB Williams Furniture, which operated until 2004. Former employees of VB Williams claim the Sumter plant closed as a result of foreign competition following the passage of NAFTA. With the closure, over 400 Sumter residents became unemployed.

== Furniture design ==
In its early years, Williams Furniture Corporation produced suites of veneered bedroom and dining room furniture. Due to the Great Depression, Williams began to produce lower-priced "small, solid wood bedroom suites."

Many of Williams Furniture's early suites were produced in a colonial revival style. One of Williams Furniture's first designers was Grand Rapids, Michigan's Marie Kirkpatrick. The most popular line of furniture was "Village Square," an Early American revival line designed by Charles Horton, an independent furniture designer based in Statesville, North Carolina. The Village Square Collection was a prize on The Price Is Right in 1961.

Williams Furniture also produced suites of furniture catered to children. These included the Adventure Series (themed to pirates), the Bunkhouse Series (themed to cowboys and the wild west), and the Young Miss Collection (themed to princesses).

== Present day ==
The Williams-Brice-Edwards Charitable Trust was established in 1988 from the financial success of Williams Furniture Corporation and supports local institutions in Sumter, South Carolina.

In 2022, a fire broke out at the former VB Williams plant.

Williams Furniture Corporation is the subject of the University of South Carolina's Wood Basket of the World project. Digital scans of materials including photographs of Williams Furniture's facilities, advertisements, and products, are available via the University of South Carolina's Digital Collections in collaboration with Sumter Museum. In Fall 2023, a University of South Carolina Honors College class developed a traveling exhibition, Forest to Furniture, focusing on the history of the Williams Furniture Corporation. This class was the subject of an episode of America History TV on C-SPAN. The project has also included oral histories, a digital exhibition, and a forthcoming Wood Basket of the World anthology.
