= The Program (1993 film) =

American sports film

- Theatrical release poster
- Directed by: David S. Ward
- Written by: David S. Ward; Aaron Latham
- Produced by: Samuel Goldwyn Jr.
- Starring: James Caan; Halle Berry; Omar Epps; Craig Sheffer; Kristy Swanson
- Music by: Michel Colombier
- Production companies: Touchstone Pictures; The Samuel Goldwyn Company
- Distributed by: Buena Vista Pictures Distribution
- Release date: September 24, 1993
- Running time: 112 minutes
- Country: United States
- Language: English
- Budget: $15-20 million
- Box office: $23 million

The Program is a 1993 American sports film starring James Caan, Halle Berry, Omar Epps, Craig Sheffer, Kristy Swanson, and Joey Lauren Adams. The film was directed by David S. Ward who has directed and written other Hollywood films such as the Major League series.

The film touches on the season of the fictional Division I FBS (then I-A) college football team, the Eastern State University (ESU) Timberwolves as they deal with the pressure to make a bowl game, alcohol and anabolic steroid abuse, receipt of improper benefits, and overall college life. It follows the trials of Coach Sam Winters (Caan), the Heisman Trophy candidate Joe Kane (Sheffer), the freshman Darnell Jefferson (Epps), their love interests (Berry and Swanson), and other team members.

The film was released by Touchstone Pictures in September 1993. The film went on to gross over $20 million at the box office. The film was shot on location at several American universities, including: Boston College, Duke University, the University of Michigan, the University of Iowa, and the University of South Carolina. While the college that is the main setting of the film is fictional, the team's opponents are real programs. The film includes a cameo appearance from Michigan coaching legend Bo Schembechler.

== Plot ==
ESU Timberwolves coach Sam Winters must win this season or be fired. Sophomore quarterback Joe Kane spends Christmas with his alcoholic family while junior Alvin Mack gives his mother a door knocker for the house he will buy when he turns pro. Running back Darnell Jefferson is recruited to ESU. Autumn, an ESU student, gives him a tour; they bond and kiss.

Kane introduces Jefferson to Mack, backup quarterback Bobby Collins and senior Steve Lattimer who has gained 35 pounds of muscle since last season. Fumbling at practice, Jefferson must carry a football with him at all times. Jefferson discovers Autumn is dating starting tailback Ray Griffen when he goes to her for tutoring. Mack tells Jefferson he will stay eligible if he's talented; he only needs to know how to sign an NFL contract. Jefferson is neither surprised nor worried when he fails the test; he convinces Autumn to tutor him. Sports Illustrated declares Kane a Heisman Trophy candidate; the pressure and stress cause him to drink. He meets tennis player Camille after riding on his motorcycle and they start dating.

Mack is shown to be barely literate, but has a strong ability to understand complex football strategy during film study. Meanwhile, the offensive coordinator fears Lattimer is on steroids, but Winters trusts him. When Lattimer is named starting defensive end, he shatters car windows with his head, screaming, "STARTING DEFENSE!! PLACE AT THE TABLE!!" Witnessed by the coordinators, they do not tell Winters, but warn Lattimer the NCAA will be drug-testing at the start of the season.

The Timberwolves open the season with victories, though Griffen is not effective as tailback and Jefferson is doing well. Uncomfortable with monetary donations from wealthy alumni as he improves, Mack tells him to take it. Jefferson and Autumn begin a relationship, but she is ashamed to tell her father, another former ESU football player. She goes back with Griffen, who plans to attend medical school.

When ESU loses a close game to Michigan, with another Heisman candidate, Kane is put in doubt. At the after party, Lattimer attempts to rape a woman but is stopped by his teammates. Winters covers up the assault but now that he can no longer ignore that Lattimer is juicing, he wants to suspend him for the season; however, his defensive coordinator warns him it could jeopardize his draft status. Lattimer is suspended for three games after confessing to Winters, but they keep the doping secret. When Mack criticizes him, Lattimer says, "You do what you have to do to play."

After the Michigan game, Kane gets drunk and is charged with a DWI. Coach Winters negotiates a plea with the DA: all charges dropped if Kane completes a 28-day program (missing four games and ending his Heisman candidacy). They must win three more games in the next five weeks to win the conference championship. Collins and the team go 2–1 in the first three games. Lattimer passes his drug test after the three weeks, returning for the penultimate game of the season against Iowa.

The game is close, but Mack has a career-ending knee injury and Lattimer is run over at the goal line. Kane finishes his 28 days, reaching out to Camille, whom he didn't speak to in rehab, and also to his father. He buys him a plane ticket to the final game against Georgia Tech. Meanwhile, Lattimer resumes steroids, having an associate replace his tainted urine with clean to pass his next drug test.

In the final game, Jefferson is the starting tailback and Griffen is fullback. Winters realizes Lattimer has continued taking steroids without failing a drug test. Kane rallies the team to victory in the fourth quarter, securing a major bowl game and saving Sam's job. They both realize Kane will likely make another run at the Heisman as a senior. Lattimer sits on the bench crying instead of celebrating, realizing he won't be able to play professionally without steroids.

After the game, Autumn presents Jefferson to her father as her boyfriend, Kane reunites with Camille, and the coaches go recruit for next year.

== Cast ==
- James Caan as Coach Sam Winters
- Halle Berry as Autumn Haley
- Omar Epps as Darnell Jefferson
- Craig Sheffer as Joe Kane
- Kristy Swanson as Camille Shafer
- Abraham Benrubi as Bud Kaminski
- Andrew Bryniarski as Steve Lattimer
- Duane Davis as Alvin Mack
- J. Leon Pridgen II as Ray Griffen
- Jon Pennell as Bobby Collins
- Joey Lauren Adams as Louanne Winters
- Rhoda Griffis as Reporter

== Production ==
Principal photography took place in and around Columbia, South Carolina, with the University of South Carolina doubling as ESU and Williams-Brice Stadium serving as the Timberwolves' home stadium. A significant amount of filming also took place on the campus of Duke University.

Last names of the crew members were used on the back of jerseys for the extras who stood in as football players.

Bo Schembechler and Lynn Swann make cameo appearance playing themselves as commentators in the film.

== Reception ==
Rotten Tomatoes, a review aggregator, reports that 43% of 21 reviewers gave the film a positive review; the average rating is 5.1/10. James Berardinelli said, "prepare to be inundated by a load of feeble, unimaginative material that's almost impossible to take seriously." Norman Chad of The Washington Post referred to the film as "one big cliche".

Roger Ebert rated the film three stars out of four, putting particular emphasis on the amount of time spent on the relative ease in passing an NCAA drug test, saying "[a]nd the movie seems expert on how a lineman could pump himself full of steroids and still pass the NCAA drug tests." Janet Maslin of The New York Times called it "routine" but praised the performance of Andrew Bryniarski, saying, "[w]hen high on steroids, he turns into a competition-crazed monster, but the film manages to make him likable anyhow." Reviewing it on video, Entertainment Weekly gave the film a B− and wrote that it is better than its reputation.

== Removed scene ==
The film originally included a scene in which Kane lies down in the middle of a road on the lane divider, cars barely missing him as they move at highway speeds. Reading aloud from a Sports Illustrated college football preview issue with him on the front cover, he comically remarks, "They're talking about how good I am under pressure." Several team members who are at first trying to stop Kane decide that it is a test of their bravery and team unity and join him.

Influenced by the scene, in October 1993, teenagers imitated it in two separate real-life incidents, resulting in one death and two injuries. This resulted in the scene being removed from the film after its release. A brief clip of the scene in question showing team members lying in the street had already been aired repeatedly in the television commercials for the film and therefore captured on VCRs. Later versions of the trailer had the clip removed.

The only known home video releases with this scene intact are the Hong Kong laserdisc published by Taishan International and the Australian DVD release. The Hong Kong release is three minutes longer than the theatrical cut and clocks in at a 115-minute run time.

== See also ==
- List of American football films
