= Michael Goodwin (actor) =

American actor

Michael W. Goodwin is an American character actor. He has appeared in a number of Aaron Spelling-produced television programs, and a number of films which take place during the American Civil War.

Goodwin appeared as recurring character Scott Bradley on the soap opera Another World in the late 1970s.

Shortly thereafter, he did theatre in his native Minnesota, appearing in Friedrich Schiller's verse play, Mary Stuart, at the Guthrie Theater, Minneapolis, with Barbara Bryne in the cast. He also appeared in George Bernard Shaw's play, Arms and the Man at the Guthrie, directed by Michael Langham.

He starred in the television series Strike Force (1981–1982, produced by Aaron Spelling) and The Hamptons (1983). He guest-starred on such Aaron Spelling productions as Charlie's Angels, The Love Boat, Matt Houston, Dynasty, Finder of Lost Loves, and Sizzle.

In 2012–2014, he was cast in small roles in a number of films centered around the Civil War: Steven Spielberg's Lincoln, the TV film Killing Lincoln, 2014's Freedom, and 2014's Field of Lost Shoes.

== Filmography ==
Film
Year	Title	Role	Notes
1979	Letters From Frank	Carstairs	TV movie; also starred Art Carney, Maureen Stapleton, Mike Farrell, Gail Strickland, and Michael J. Fox
1980	Werner Herzog Eats His Shoe	Driver	
1981	Sizzle	Danny Clark	TV movie
1982	Remembrance of Love	Ken	
1985	Latino	Becket	
1988	Buy & Cell	Reggie	
1988	The Dead Pool	Lieutenant Ackerman	
1994	Foreign Student	Assistant coach	
1994	The Road to Wellville	Dr. Frank Linniman	
1995	Life 101	Detective	
1997	Lolita	Mr. Beale	
2000	Cherry Falls	Mr. Duwald	
2000	The Contender	Reporter	
2000	Songcatcher	Professor Wallace Aldrich	
2004	Crazy Like a Fox	Judge Robinson	
2004	Iron Jawed Angels	Chief of Staff	
2005	The New World	Helmsman	
2010	Fair Game	David Addington	
2012	Lincoln	Chilton A. Elliot	
2012	Stuck in Love	Professor Abbott	
2013	Killing Lincoln	Captain Arvold	
2014	Field of Lost Shoes	Secretary of State Seward	
2014	Freedom	Garrett	

Television
Year	Title	Role	Air date	Episode title	Notes
1975–1977	Another World	Scott Bradley	July 22, 1975 (Episode #1.2788); January 21, 1976 (Episode #1.2917); June 9, 1977 (Episode #1.3273)	3 episodes	
1978	Charlie's Angels	Bill Freeman	September 27, 1978 (season 3, episode 3)	"Angel on High"	
1978	The Paper Chase	Roger Todd	December 12, 1978 (season 1, episode 12)	"Bell's in Love"	
1981–1982	Strike Force	Det. Sgt. Mark Osborne	April 2, 1981 – May 21, 1982	20 episodes	Entire series
1981	The Love Boat	Det. Sgt. Mark Osborne	October 17, 1981 (season 5, episode 3)	"Two Grapes on the Vine / Aunt Sylvia / Deductible Divorce"	
1983	The Hamptons	Peter Chadway	July 27 – August 24, 1983	5 episodes	Entire series
1984	St. Elsewhere	Dr. Christopher Rant	January 11, 1984 (season 2, episode 10); February 15, 1984 (season 2, episode 14); February 22, 1984 (season 2, episode 15)	3 episodes — "A Pig Too Far", "Drama Center", "Attack"	
1984	Finder of Lost Loves	Ben Allison	September 29, 1984 (season 1, episode 2)	"Yesterday's Child"	
1984–1985	Matt Houston	Will Houston	November 2, 1984 (season 3, episode 6); November 9, 1984 (season 3, episode 7); January 11, 1985 (season 3, episode 14)	3 episodes — "Return to Nam: Part 1", "Escape from Nam: Part 2", and "Breakpoint"	Plays the main character's cousin
1987	Falcon Crest	Alex Green	January 2, 1987 (season 6, episode 13); January 9, 1987 (season 6, episode 14); January 23, 1987 (season 6, episode 15); January 30, 1987 (season 6, episode 16)	4 episodes — "Missed Connections", "Dark Passion", "When the Bough Breaks", and "The Cradle Will Fall"	
