= Stick (film) =

1985 American crime film by Burt Reynolds

- Theatrical release poster
- Directed by: Burt Reynolds
- Screenplay by: Elmore Leonard; Joseph Stinson
- Based on: Stick by Elmore Leonard
- Produced by: Jennings Lang; Robert Daley (executive producer)
- Starring: Burt Reynolds; George Segal; Candice Bergen; Charles Durning
- Cinematography: Nick McLean
- Edited by: William D. Gordean
- Music by: Joseph Conlan; Barry De Vorzon
- Distributed by: Universal Pictures
- Release date: April 26, 1985
- Running time: 109 minutes
- Country: United States
- Language: English
- Budget: $22 million
- Box office: $8,489,518

Stick is a 1985 American crime film based on Elmore Leonard's 1983 novel, and starring and directed by Burt Reynolds.

== Plot ==
Ernest "Stick" Stickley, a former carjacker, has just been released from prison after serving seven years for armed robbery. He meets up with an old friend, Rainy, who talks Stick into accompanying him for a "quick stop" near the Florida Everglades before they go to his home. The "quick stop" turns out to be an illegal drug deal set up by Rainy's dealer, Chucky, that goes sour. Chucky's albino assassin, Moke, kills Rainy, but Stick manages to escape. Stick must now hide out for a while to avoid the killers, who are prepared to eliminate him as a witness.

While lying low, Stick finds himself in the right place at the right time when he helps a wealthy eccentric named Barry Braham, get into his locked car. Hired as a chauffeur, he now has a comfortable home with a stable job, and tries to make up for lost time with Katie, his teenage daughter. He also finds a new flame in Kyle, a financial consultant who acts as a business adviser for Barry, who must choose if a relationship with Stick is worth it.

Stick approaches Chucky to demand the money owed to his murdered friend, wanting to use the money to start a new life. Chucky refuses, and after being pressured by his voodoo obsessed cartel employer, Nestor, to slaughter the latter, Chucky sends Moke and some other hitmen after Stick. Nestor has Katie kidnapped to force Stick out of hiding.

Nestor, fed up with Chucky's bumbling, hires Moke to dispatch him. Stick challenges the pair on the balcony of Chucky's high rise apartment before Moke can shoot Chucky, and Moke taunts Stick to try and get to him before he can pull a handgun from his belt. Chucky surprises Moke, and push each over the balcony railing. Chucky takes a deadly hurtle to the ground below, but Moke manages to grab onto a lower beam. Moke asks for help, but Stick mocks as Moke falls to his death, shooting his gun at Stick on the way down.

Stick goes to Nestor's home, and methodically butchers all of Nestor's henchmen, before confronting Nestor himself. After Stick shoots up the bar area around him, a terrified Nestor surrenders, and agrees to leave Stick and Katie alone in exchange for his own life. After rescuing his daughter, Stick calls Kyle on a mobile phone and arranges for the two lovers to meet in the median of a highway, where they embrace.

== Cast ==
- Burt Reynolds as Ernest "Stick" Stickley
- Candice Bergen as Kyle McClaren
- Charles Durning as Chucky
- George Segal as Barry Braun
- Jose Perez as Reinaldo "Rainy"
- David Reynoso as Luis
- Richard Lawson as Cornell
- Cástulo Guerra as Nestor
- Dar Robinson as Moke
- Tricia Leigh Fisher as Katie Stickley
- Sachi Parker as Bobbi
- Alex Rocco as Firestone
- Tim Rossovich as Cecil
- Don Moyer as Lionel
- Lamar Jackson as Edgar
- Dudley Remus as Harvey
- Deanna Lund as Diane
- Jorge Gil as Chucky's Hood
- Armand Grossman Chucky's Hood
- Ignacio Menocal as Nestor's Hood
- Jesus Menocal as Nestor's Hood
- Dave Cadiente as Nestor's Hood
- Carlos Cervantes as Nestor's Hood
- Richard L. Duran as Nestor's Hood
- Thomas Rosales, Jr. as Nestor's Hood
- Bert Rosario as Bodega Owner
- Phanie Napoli as Louisa Rosa
- April Clough as Chucky's Girl

== Production ==
=== Original book ===
The original novel Stick was published in 1983, although the character of Stick had appeared in Leonard's Swag. The book sold well and, along with the publication of La Brava, and helped revive interest in Leonard's career, particularly when it was announced Burt Reynolds would make a film of it.

Reviewing the book, the New York Times wrote "when Mr. Leonard is observing, satirizing, plotting, working up suspense, thickening the air with menace, discharging it in lightning flashes of violence, exposing the black holes behind the parts people play - when he tends to business, that is, he gives us as much serious fun per word as anyone around."

Leonard expressed interest in writing more books with the character of Stick because he "is so unpredictable that I can probably get a lot more mileage out of him."

=== Development ===
"I wanted to make that movie as soon as I read the book," said Reynolds. "I respected Leonard's work. I felt I knew that Florida way of life, having been raised in the state. And I was that guy!"

Leonard was paid $350,000 to write a screenplay.

=== Filming ===
Filming took place in Florida in October 1983.

George Segal said he liked working on the film. "If you had ever asked me if I'd ever be in a Burt Reynolds movie, I would've said, 'There's no way. No chance.' I don't know how that happened. Oh, I think he saw A Touch of Class and wanted me. Whatever it was, I had a great time down in Florida. He was a wonderful director, and he made it so nice for the actors. It's so nice to have an actor or an ex-actor directing you, because they get it, you know?"

Famed stuntman Dar Robinson, who played Moke, the albino hit-man, filmed his death scene by free falling from the side of a building while firing a gun. Robinson used his own invention, a decelerator, so cameras could film from above without a visible airbag below (a scattering crowd of people below can also be seen in this shot). A braking device slowed his descent as he fell backwards towards the ground. This was Robinson's only true acting credit before he died in an on-set motorcycle accident during the making of Million Dollar Mystery in 1986.

=== Reshoots ===
Reynolds recalled, "I turned in my cut of the picture and truly thought I had made a good film. Word got back to me quickly that the people in the Black Tower [Universal's head office] wanted a few changes."

He later reflected, "It was one of those usual Universal Studio stories: A director goes and makes a movie and thinks it's wonderful. I went tripping down to Florida to relax, and I get a call from (MCA president) Sid Sheinberg saying he hated the movie. I said, 'So what? I'm sorry you don't feel good about it, but I tried.' He said, 'You don't understand; we're going to recut it, rescore it and reshoot it.' And they did."

The studio pulled the movie from its release schedule and asked Reynolds to reshoot the second half of the film. A new writer was brought in along with a subplot involving his character reuniting with his daughter post-prison. Reynolds says his agent advised him to go along with the changes:

I gave up on the film. I didn't fight them. I let them get the best of me...Leonard saw the film the day he was interviewed for a Newsweek cover and told them he hated it. After his comment, every critic attacked the film and he wouldn't talk to me. When I reshot the film, I was just going through the motions. I'm not proud of what I did, but I take responsibility for my actions. All I can say--and this is not in way of a defense--is if you liked the first part of 'Stick,' that's what I was trying to achieve throughout.

"I didn't say anything at the time," he later added. "I decided to keep my mouth shut and swallow hard. But it was devastating. I didn't want to direct for another four years."

== Reception ==
Stick received generally negative reviews from critics. Despite opening at No. 1 in its first weekend, the film was a box-office flop, grossing just $8.5 million when compared to its $22 million budget.

=== Critical ===
On Rotten Tomatoes, the film holds an approval rating of 38% based on 8 reviews, with an average rating of 4/10. On Metacritic the film has a weighted average score of 31 out of 100, based on 10 critics, indicating "generally unfavorable reviews". Audiences polled by CinemaScore gave the film an average grade of "C+" on an A+ to F scale.

Janet Maslin of The New York Times wrote that Reynolds had been miscast "by a director who should have known better, that director being Mr. Reynolds himself. Certainly his eagerness to film Mr. Leonard's Florida-based crime drama is understandable; the book has crackling tough-guy dialogue and a story that practically tells itself. What is less understandable is his insistence on reshaping such ostensibly foolproof material to support a star turn." A review in Variety stated "Despite a few good action sequences, overall pic lacks the tension and suspense that could have got audiences involved instead of only mildly interested. Reynolds' direction is competent, but lacks the texture that could have fleshed out the distinctive personalities." Gene Siskel gave the film one-and-a-half stars out of four and wrote, "What director Reynolds and actor Reynolds have done to 'Stick' is inexcusable. They've made it part burlesque and part conventional chase picture. Actor Reynolds' portrayal of Stick, a gritty ex-con out to avenge a friend's murder, is not much different from his good-old-boy persona in the 'Cannonball Run' films." Sheila Benson of the Los Angeles Times wrote that Elmore Leonard's novel "has been rendered jokey, flaccid, and, the worst crime of all, deadly slow. All this in spite of the fact that Leonard was the original screenwriter." Paul Attanasio of The Washington Post wrote "Reynolds never figures out whether he's making a thriller or a spoof, which has been the problem with his performances, too. His acting swivels from gravelly, glowering tough-guyness to nudge-and-wink appeals to the audience—Mr. T and Johnny Carson in one. And he's way too polished for the character Leonard wrote; when he enters the slick world of Miami finance, he blends right in."

=== Elmore Leonard reaction ===
Leonard later said Reynolds "just didn't do it right at all..." "I didn't recognize my screenplay at all in that movie. They even put another writer on it to add more action... Burt had done Sharky's Machine and Gator and I thought he would be good as Stick. But he needed a good director. Directing it himself, he just played Burt Reynolds."

"It's very, very theatrical," Leonard added. "I do everything in my power to make my writing not look like writing, and when it appears on the screen you see all these actors acting all over the place." The movie's advertising slogan was: "The only thing he couldn't do was stick to the rules." Leonard hung up a poster in his den with the word "rules" covered by a piece of paper on which was written the word "script".

"The movie isn't anything like the book," he said. "The plot was taken out. In place of the scam are machine guns."

Leonard compared it with the film made of 52 Pick-Up. "One thing I like a lot [about that film] is the pacing -- the picture begins immediately, and from there it moves. The dialogue doesn't wait for a reaction, it's almost throwaway, with the exception that you can hear it clearly. In Stick, Burt Reynolds gave you a beat or two after every line so you could react to it, like it was a comedy. It ruined the rhythm."

=== Proposed TV series ===
In 1988, NBC had a TV spin-off of the novel in development. However no series resulted.
