= The Horsemen (1971 film) =

American adventure film by John Frankenheimer

- Promotional film poster
- Directed by: John Frankenheimer
- Written by: Dalton Trumbo
- Based on: Les cavaliers 1967 novel by Joseph Kessel
- Produced by: Edward Lewis
- Starring: Omar Sharif; Leigh Taylor-Young; Jack Palance
- Cinematography: André Domage; James Wong Howe; Claude Renoir
- Edited by: Harold F. Kress
- Music by: Georges Delerue
- Production company: John Frankenheimer Productions
- Distributed by: Columbia Pictures
- Release date: July 24, 1971
- Running time: 109 minutes
- Country: United States
- Language: English
- Budget: $4.7 million

The Horsemen is a 1971 American adventure film starring Omar Sharif, directed by John Frankenheimer; screenplay by Dalton Trumbo. Based on a 1967 novel by French writer Joseph Kessel, Les Cavaliers (The Horsemen) shows Afghanistan and its people the way they were before the wars that wracked the country, particularly their love for the sport of buzkashi. The film was filmed in Afghanistan and Spain.

== Plot ==
Uraz (Omar Sharif), the son of Tursen (Jack Palance), the stable master and retired buzkashi player for a feudal lord, is a master horseman who lives by a primitive code of honor. Uraz's family honor is damaged when he breaks his leg playing the game, which is the Afghani equivalent of polo. His father, who lost a lot of money betting on his son, will barely speak to him. To regain the family honor (and wealth) he must somehow re-learn how to ride – after his injuries cost him his leg below the knee. In the face of great obstacles, and despite the derision and treachery of others, he gains the chance to play in the games given by the king of Afghanistan.

== Cast ==
- Omar Sharif as Uraz
- Jack Palance as Tursen
- Leigh Taylor-Young as Zareh the untouchable whore
- Peter Jeffrey as Hayatal
- Srinanda De as Bukhi
- George Murcell as Mizrar the shepherd
- Eric Pohlmann as Merchant in Kabul
- Vernon Dobtcheff as Zam Hajji
- Saeed Jaffrey as District Chief
- John Ruddock as Scribe
- Mark Colleano
- Salmaan Peerzada as Salih
- Aziz Resham as Bacha to Ghulam
- Leon Lissek as Chaikhana proprietor
- Vida St. Romaine as Gypsy Woman

== Production ==
The original novel was published in 1967. It was a best seller in France before being released in the US. Film rights were bought by John Frankenheimer and Edward Lewis who set up the film at Columbia. Dalton Trumbo, who had just written The Fixer for Frankenheimer, was signed to do the script.

The film took two and a half years to make and was shot on location in Afghanistan, and in Spain (including Caminito del Rey). According to director John Frankenheimer:

It represents for me the first time I've been able to put together the two sides of my work – the spectacle like Grand Prix or The Train and the intimate kind of picture like Birdman of Alcatraz or Seven Days in May. For me it has a very contemporary meaning, which is why I did it. It's a man looking for himself, a theme that I've done over and over on TV and in movies. I do think that Dalton Trumbo is the best screenwriter we've got... Most of my films are about putting people under extreme pressure. Because my contention in life is that how you know people is how they respond to a crisis.

== Reception ==
The film was a box office disappointment. It remained, however, a personal favorite of John Frankenheimer, who later said the film had been "dumped" by Columbia after various executives were in conflict with each other.

Roger Ebert gave the film two and a half of four stars and wrote that "neither John Frankenheimer's spare, heroic direction nor Claude Renoir's spectacular photography can quite bring this horseman to life." Vincent Canby of the New York Times called the film and the novel of The Horsemen "fiction designed to glorify machismo of the most ignorant, savage sort," and called the movie "a remote, choppy adventure."

== See also ==
- List of films about horses
- List of American films of 1971
