= Strike Force (TV series) =

- Starring: Robert Stack; Dorian Harewood; Herb Edelman; Michael Goodwin; Richard Romanus; Trisha Noble
- Theme music composer: Dominic Frontiere
- Composers: Dominic Frontiere Mark Snow Allyn Ferguson Nelson Riddle Ken Harrison Mundell Lowe John E. Davis
- Country of origin: United States
- Original language: English
- No. of seasons: 1
- No. of episodes: 20

Production
- Executive producers: Aaron Spelling; Douglas S. Cramer
- Producers: E. Duke Vincent; Elaine Rich
- Running time: 60 minutes
- Production company: Aaron Spelling Productions

Original release
- Network: ABC
- Release: April 2, 1981 – May 21, 1982

Strike Force is an American action-adventure/police procedural television series that aired on ABC during the 1981–1982 television season, and was produced by Aaron Spelling Productions. The program starred Robert Stack as Capt. Frank Murphy, the leader of a specialized unit of detectives and police officers whose job is to stop violent criminals at any cost (usually with a hail of gunfire).

== Overview ==
Mixing elements of Stack's classic television series The Untouchables from 20 years earlier with doses of Mission: Impossible and Dirty Harry, Strike Force immediately provoked controversy over its violence – at one point the series was labeled the most violent in American TV history. The series attempted to balance the violence by interjecting liberal amounts of humor into its regular characters and focusing on the detectives' personal lives.

== Cast ==
- Series star Robert Stack's character, SCPD Det. Capt. Frank Murphy, is the head of the special Strike Force unit. He is a tough, incorruptible cop, tenacious and efficient on the job, but whose personal life is as unkempt as the home he lives in. He is a recent divorcé who is stuck with a house that was painted pink by his ex-wife, Eve (who left him for a career in show business, but whom he still obviously loves dearly), where he lives with Sam, his scruffy, oversized, beer-drinking dog (whose main source of nutrition appears to be a brand of dog food labeled "Doggone It"). He is as tough as nails, but caring and fair, and loyal to the people under his command. Capt. Murphy's favorite food is chili dogs (which he seems to "require" everyone on his team of "Strike Force" detectives to eat); his constant nemesis is the squad room soda machine, which seems to work for everyone in the precinct but him, and is a running joke in the series.
- Det. Sgt. Paul Strobber, played by Dorian Harewood, is the only married member of the team, and the most serious; a loving family man, with a wife and young son, but easily the most fearless and dangerous Strike Force member on the street. He is like a coiled spring, ready to strike when provoked, as he does when his family is threatened by white supremacists in the episode "The Outcasts". He likes to wear turtleneck sweaters instead of ties, and hates Murphy's chili dog diet, refusing to share in it.
- Det. Sgt. Rosie Johnson, played by former Australian teen singing star Trisha Noble, is tough, curvaceous, and beautiful — and very much a lady. She became a police officer after her husband went missing in Vietnam and enjoys making — and-deflecting — jokes about her bust size. She is crazy about Gunzer, and often tries to get him to notice her.
- Det. Lt. Charlie Gunzer, played by Richard Romanus, is the group's free-spending ladies' man, with a dry, wicked sense of humor, who Rosie likes, but is afraid to tell him. Gunzer likes fast cars (in one episode, he buys a Mercedes SL sports car), and faster women, and looks upon the chaste Rosie as nothing more than a friend and colleague.
- Det. Sgt. Mark Osborne, played by Michael Goodwin, is the youngest member of the team, and clearly the most "normal" in this dynamic, dysfunctional group. Called "The Kid" by Gunzer, he is a dedicated police officer whose favorite food is chocolate chip cookies. He likes Rosie, and has asked her out at least once, but to no avail.
- Deputy Police Commissioner Herbert Klein, as played by Herb Edelman, is Strike Force's immediate superior, and a close personal friend to Capt. Murphy. A dedicated cop and family man, Herb was cited several times for valor in his early career, but seems to have lost his taste for the violence in the streets, and now is content simply to stay behind a desk and wait out his time until retirement. He is also an amateur author, who often asks Murphy his opinion on the novels he writes — which never seem to get published.

== Guest stars ==
Notable guest stars during the series run included:

- Eric Braeden, best known for his roles as Victor Newman on the soap opera The Young and the Restless, and as Hans Dietrich in the 1960s TV series The Rat Patrol, guest-starred in the episode "The John Killers".
- Paul Brinegar, known for his co-starring roles in TV series such as Rawhide, Wyatt Earp, and the Clint Eastwood film High Plains Drifter, guest-starred in the episode "Fallen Angel".
- Joanna Cassidy guest-starred as Frank's ex-wife, Eve Murphy, in the episode "Turnabout" (which probably would have been a recurring role had the series continued).
- Christopher Connelly, best known for the ABC series Peyton Place, guest-starred in the episode "Death Fare".
- Billy Drago, who would go on to play Frank Nitti in the feature film version of Stack's TV series, The Untouchables, played a killer in the 90-minute Strike Force pilot.
- Laurence Fishburne, future star of CSI: Crime Scene Investigation, The Matrix and its sequels (as Morpheus), and Academy Award nominee for What's Love Got to Do with It, guest-starred in the episode "Humiliation".
- Richard Herd, best known in the science fiction community for his role in the 1983 NBC miniseries V and the 1984 sequel V: The Final Battle, as John, the Visitors' Supreme Commander, and on Star Trek: Voyager as Admiral Owen Paris, the father of Tom Paris, guest-starred in the episode "Kidnap".
- Tab Hunter played a killer in the episode "Night Nurse".
- David McCallum, best known for his co-starring roles in The Man from U.N.C.L.E. and NCIS, played an international hit man with a long-standing grudge against Murphy in the episode "ICE".
- Sam Melville, who co-starred in another Aaron Spelling cop series, The Rookies, guest-starred in the episode "Internal Affair".
- Lynne Moody played twin sisters in the episode "The Victims".
- Jeanette Nolan guest-starred in the episode "Sharks".
- Paul Picerni, who played Stack's second-in-command, Agt. Lee Hobson, in The Untouchables, played a doctor in the episode "The John Killers".
- Raymond St. Jacques also guest-starred in the episode "Turnabout" as an FBI agent.
- Elizabeth Stack, Robert Stack's real-life daughter, appeared in the episode "Lonely Ladies".
- Don Stroud played a mobster out to kill Murphy in the episode "Turnabout".
- Philip Michael Thomas, future star of Miami Vice, guest-starred in the episode "The Victims".

== Episodes ==
No.	Title	Directed by	Written by	Original release date
1	"Pilot"	Richard Lang	Lane Slate	November 13, 1981
Five bizarre and brutal murders bring together the Sheriff's Department, LAPD, and the Highway Patrol as a special strike force. Headed by Captain Frank Murphy, the force begins their investigation -- their only clue is that each victim served on the jury of an embezzlement case.
2	"Kidnap"	Lawrence Dobkin	Michael Fisher	November 20, 1981
The team is tipped off about a kidnapping by Frank's ex-partner, a source who claims he also witnessed a murder. This episode was directed by Lawrence Dobkin, who portrayed gangster Dutch Schultz in three episodes of Stack's ABC series The Untouchables, and who also directed another Strike Force episode — "Fallen Angel".
3	"The Victims"	Lane Slate	Lane Slate	November 27, 1981
The Force gambles that money will motivate a woman to set up her colleagues in crime.
4	"The Predator"	Richard Lang	Calvin Clements Jr.	December 4, 1981
Murphy plays on the emotional insecurity of a sadistic rapist who stalks his victims in supermarkets.
5	"Magic Man"	Richard Lang	E. Nick Alexander	December 11, 1981
A dealer uses marijuana and pills to lure teenagers into pushing harder drugs to their friends.
6	"Night Nurse"	Cliff Bole	Michael Fisher	December 18, 1981
Patients have been dying inexplicably at four hospitals — including the one where Klein is taken following a heart attack.
7	"The Hollow Man"	Richard Lang	William Douglas Lansford	December 25, 1981
A bomber sends Klein a photographic clue to his next target, and then pays him a visit.
8	"The Outcasts"	Don Chaffey	T : Gene Hanson; S/T : T J. Miles	January 8, 1982
Strobber shoots a teenage robber whose racist partners swear revenge in a taped message left on the body of a slain Black cop.
9	"Ice"	Cliff Bole	Jeffrey Bloom	January 15, 1982
An international hit man plays cat and mouse with Frank, who has 48 hours to determine his target.
10	"Internal Affairs"	Bob Sweeney	Les Carter	January 22, 1982
Clues in a string of jewelry-store robberies point to on-duty policemen -- and the captain of Internal Affairs — who try to pin the crimes on Gunzer.
11	"Lonely Ladies"	Bob Sweeney	William Hopkins	February 5, 1982
The common element in a series of rape-murders is that the victims were last seen in singles bars.
12	"Fallen Angel"	Lawrence Dobkin	S : Robert Brennan; T : Joe Gores	February 12, 1982
A murderous cult is alerted to a police investigation by the mayor's premature press conference.
13	"Shark"	Cliff Bole	S : George R. Hodges; S/T : Ron Friedman	February 19, 1982
Muggings of the elderly go unchecked until a councilwoman is murdered trying to stop an attack.
14	"Turnabout"	Cliff Bole	S : Fenton Hobart Jr. T : Calvin Clements Jr.	February 26, 1982
A mobster's right-hand man uses Murphy's ex-wife to contact him about becoming a government-protected witness.
15	"The John Killer"	Don Chaffey	S : F. Michael Johnson & E. Byrne; T : Michael Fisher & Calvin Clements Jr.	March 5, 1982
Conventioneers are being murdered by someone masquerading as a call girl.
16	"Humiliation"	Robert Gist	Bill Stratton	March 19, 1982
Young muggers out on bail terrorize witnesses scheduled to testify against them.
17	"Deadly Chemicals"	Charles Picerni	S : William Douglas Lansford; T : Bill Stratton	March 26, 1982
Prison escapees hijack a military van, unaware of the contents: refrigerated germ-warfare cultures.
18	"Revenge"	Don Chaffey	Rick Kelbaugh	April 2, 1982
A high-school girl left for dead by kidnappers provides the break in a series of abductions.
19	"Chinatown"	Mike Vejar	Calvin Clements Jr.	April 9, 1982
Gunzer and his girlfriend are wounded by hit men and the street talk is the girl was the target.
20	"Death Fare"	Don Chaffey	S : Glen Olson & Rod Baker; T : Bill Stratton & Michael Fisher	April 16, 1982
A policeman's widow is terrorized by phone calls from a man who claims to be her husband trying to avenge his "death".

== Reception ==
Although initially popular, the novelty of the series quickly wore off; only 19 episodes were produced, plus the 90-minute pilot. According to Todd Gitlin's 1983 book Inside Prime Time, Strike Force finished a dismal 76 out of 105 shows in the Nielsen ratings for the 1981–82 season.

Another factor in the series' demise was the competition: ABC pitted Strike Force against the successful CBS soap-opera Falcon Crest, which had, as its lead-in, the then-number one show on television, Dallas.

== Home media ==
The first episode of Strike Force was released on video in North America in the late 1980s.

As of 2018, there has been no official DVD release of this series, though there have been several requests for its release, and bootleg copies have circulated in the "collectors market" for the last three decades since Strike Force's cancellation.
