= The Big Bounce (2004 film) =

- Theatrical release poster
- Directed by: George Armitage
- Screenplay by: Sebastian Gutierrez
- Based on: The Big Bounce by Elmore Leonard
- Produced by: George Armitage; Brent Armitage; Steve Bing; Jorge Saralegui; Channing Dungey
- Starring: Owen Wilson; Morgan Freeman; Gary Sinise; Sara Foster; Willie Nelson; Vinnie Jones; Bebe Neuwirth; Charlie Sheen
- Cinematography: Jeffrey L. Kimball
- Edited by: Barry Malkin
- Music by: George S. Clinton
- Production company: Shangri-La Entertainment
- Distributed by: Warner Bros. Pictures
- Release date: January 30, 2004
- Running time: 88 minutes
- Country: United States
- Language: English
- Budget: $50 million
- Box office: $6.8 million

The Big Bounce is a 2004 American heist comedy film starring Owen Wilson, Charlie Sheen, Sara Foster and Morgan Freeman. It was directed by George Armitage in his final directing role. It is based on the 1969 novel of the same name by Elmore Leonard. Leonard's novel had previously been adapted for the big screen in a 1969 film of the same name directed by Alex March and starring Ryan O'Neal.

The Big Bounce was released by Warner Bros. Pictures on January 30, 2004. The film received negative reviews from critics and grossed $6.8 million against a $50 million budget, making it a box office bomb.

== Plot ==
Jack Ryan, a surfer and small-time thief, has a fight with the intimidating Lou Harris, involving a baseball bat. Harris is a foreman on a Hawaii construction site run by duplicitous millionaire Ray Ritchie. When Jack is released from jail, both the police and Ritchie's business partner, Bob Rogers Jr., tell Jack to leave the island.

However, Judge Walter Crewes takes a liking to Jack and offers him a place to stay and a job as a handyman at a small resort of beach-front bungalows that he owns. Jack has treacherous encounters with Harris and Rogers Jr., on numerous occasions.

Ritchie has all his (substantial) property registered in the name of his wife, Alison. He is also cheating on her with a much younger woman, Nancy Hayes. When Nancy takes an interest in Jack, the Judge warns him that she likes "the criminal type" and cannot be trusted. Jack is falling for Nancy, and they break into houses for fun and profit.

Nancy suggests to Jack a scheme to steal $200,000 that Ritchie is keeping for bribes and mob business. She arranges for him to sneak into Ritchie's house to steal the money from his safe. Jack arrives to find Ritchie face down motionless and his friend Frank shot and lifeless (although he does jump up and run off moments after he's hit the ground, only wounded superficially).

In a conspiracy with Alison, Nancy has set up Jack to be Ritchie's "killer", with Alison to shoot him dead as an intruder. Alison blundered by overdosing Ritchie with poison, and shot the wrong man, Frank.

It is revealed that Judge Crewes tried to make Jack the patsy as he is Alison's lover and has been part of the conspiracy, with the two promising to give Nancy the $200,000 for her part. Jack manages to steal the money from the safe before Nancy can, narrowly escaping and leaving Alison and Crewes to frame Nancy as Ritchie's killer.

Alison and Crewes are seen sailing Ritchie's yacht, disposing of his body in the ocean. Nancy is in disguise, trying to escape the island before she is arrested for Ritchie's disappearance and murder. Jack spots Nancy as he's driving past her in a limousine, stopping to wish her well but refusing to help her after her attempt to frame him. He departs with the money and the beautiful vacationer from bungalow number 9 that he met while working at Judge Crewe's resort.

== Cast ==
- Owen Wilson as Jack Ryan
- Morgan Freeman as Walter Crewes
- Charlie Sheen as Bob Rogers Jr.
- Sara Foster as Nancy Hayes
- Vinnie Jones as Lou Harris
- Gary Sinise as Ray Ritchie
- Bebe Neuwirth as Alison Ritchie
- Anahit Minasyan as Number 9
- Willie Nelson as Joe Lurie
- Harry Dean Stanton as Bob Rogers Sr.
- Wendy Thorlakson as Wendy the party planner
- Kala Alexander as himself

== Production ==
George Armitage was given a copy of Sebastian Gutirrez's script by Steve Bing, who became a producer on the film.

The Big Bounce, the book, when you break it down, is basically an act and a half. It's not a real three acts. So you're going to have to add half of the picture. So right away you're in trouble with somebody like Elmore, who I considered to be an absolutely brilliant writer. So he worked on the script with me, he gave me notes, and the notes are classic, they're great. —George Armitage

The setting for the film was moved from the Thumb area of Michigan, where the novel was set, to the North Shore of Oahu. The film was shot on location in Hawaii.

On the first day of pre-production, Armitage was hit in the eye with a piece of lava rock and contracted a virus. The director came down with an infection with two weeks left to shoot and had to go to the hospital, shutting down production, with Armitage commenting that, "Fortunately it was right at Christmas, so it turned into a Christmas break that we hadn't planned on, and I completed the picture afterwards."

Armitage says that despite this the film was very pleasant. "Now, being in Hawaii was probably a great deal of that. But it was just an extraordinary experience, and I credit the producer, Steve Bing, with that. He put up his own money, and I think he had $250,000 in bar bills, just picking up drinks for the crew and cast for all that time. So he couldn't have been more wonderful."

=== Post-production ===
According to Armitage, the film changed course in post-production, after the original cut was rated NC-17, and producer Bing decided to re-edit and seek a PG-Rating instead of the director's preference, an R rating.

He was getting advice from people who're in the money business, and he felt that to have a chance to get his money back, he should go PG-13. The first time we showed the film, it came in at an NC-17 instead of an R. And it was unreleasable in that form. So I said: "We'll make it an R". But they said: "You can't make an R-rated comedy, they don't make money". That's what they were saying in 2004. Since then, of course, a lot of R-rated comedies have done beautifully. So I said: “Look, I'm not going to oversee the destruction of my own movie, there's no way. If you go to a PG-13, you're going to eliminate Elmore Leonard from this movie". But the decision was made—they felt that they had to do that, so I said: "Goodbye". I left the picture after my second cut... when people ask to see my last movie, I show them my cut of The Big Bounce, I don't show them what's out there. It isn't absolutely complete, but I think it could have been a far, far better film.

== Reception ==
On Rotten Tomatoes, The Big Bounce has an approval rating of 16% based on 135 reviews, with an average score of 4.20/10. The site's consensus states: "Lazily crafted and light on substance, The Big Bounce takes few chances and strands its promising cast in a subpar adaptation that fails to do its source material justice." On Metacritic, the film has a score of 42 out of a 100 based on 36 critics, indicating "mixed or average reviews". Audiences surveyed by CinemaScore gave the film a grade "D" on scale of A to F.

Joe Leydon of Variety called it a "Modestly engaging, albeit instantly forgettable shaggy-dog story only gradually reveals itself as a seriocomic take on standard-issue noir." Roger Ebert of the Chicago Sun-Times gave it 2 out of 4 stars. Although he enjoyed the characters, he was critical of the lack of focus and wrote, "The movie doesn't work. It meanders and drifts and riffs."

Author Elmore Leonard called the 1969 film version of his story, The Big Bounce, filmed in California with Ryan O'Neal and Leigh Taylor-Young, "the second-worst movie ever made", second only to this 2004 remake.

=== Box office ===
This film flopped at the American box office, grossing $6,808,550 against its $50 million budget.
