= The Hamptons (TV series) =

Television series

The Hamptons is a prime-time soap opera which ran for five episodes on ABC during the summer of 1983. The show centered on the wealthy Chadway and Duncan-Mortimer families, who commuted between the affluent Long Island community, and their jointly owned department store chain in Manhattan.

== Series overview ==
The Hamptons was produced by Gloria Monty, best known for turning the initially low-rated daytime serial General Hospital into a soap phenomenon. The series was shot on videotape rather than film, which gave it a look consistent with most daytime soap operas, and featured many cast members from daytime shows, such as Leigh Taylor-Young (Peyton Place), Michael Goodwin (Another World), John Reilly (As the World Turns and Dallas) and Bibi Besch (Secrets of Midland Heights, Somerset and Love Is a Many Splendored Thing).

The show aired Wednesday nights ahead of reruns of Dynasty. Its storylines were driven by the rivalry between the Chadway and Duncan-Mortimer families, as each family aimed to gain control of the Duncan-Chadway department chain. The Chadways included Peter Chadway, managing director of Duncan-Chadway, his wife Lee, son Brian and daughter Miranda. The Duncan-Mortimers were headed by Adrienne, an alcoholic heiress, her husband Jay, president of Duncan-Chadway, and Tracy, her daughter from a previous marriage who is engaged to Brian. Also featured were Dr. David Landau, his lawyer girlfriend Cheryl Ashcroft, and rival businessman Nick Atwater of the Syndrex conglomerate. Fran Carlon appeared in a recurring role as Ada, the family housekeeper.

By the fifth and final episode, Peter Chadway was accused of murdering Penny Drake (Jada Rowland), the store's personnel director, and Jay Mortimer was exposed as having forced his stepdaughter Tracy into an incestuous relationship. It was hoped that if ratings were strong, the series would return to the ABC schedule at some point. However, no further episodes were produced and the cliffhangers were left unresolved.

== Cast and characters ==
- Bibi Besch as Adrienne Duncan-Mortimer
- Martha Byrne as Miranda Chadway
- Philip Casnoff as David Landau
- Kate Dezina as Cheryl Ashcroft
- Michael Goodwin as Peter Chadway
- Daniel Pilon as Nick Atwater
- John Reilly as Jay Mortimer
- Holly Roberts as Tracy Mortimer
- Craig Sheffer as Brian Chadway
- Leigh Taylor-Young as Lee Chadway

== Episodes ==
No.	Title	Directed by	Written by	Original release date	Viewers (millions)
1	"Episode One"	Burt Brinckerhoff	William Bast & Paul Huson	July 27, 1983	13.8
2	"Episode Two"	Burt Brinckerhoff	Frank V. Furino	August 3, 1983	9.2
3	"Episode Three"	Burt Brinckerhoff	Story by : William Bast & Paul Huson; Teleplay by : Doris Silverton	August 10, 1983	14.8
4	"Episode Four"	Burt Brinckerhoff	Story by : William Bast & Paul Huson; Teleplay by : Michael Russnow	August 17, 1983	13.7
5	"Episode Five"	Burt Brinckerhoff	Story by : William Bast & Paul Huson; Teleplay by : Howard Lakin	August 24, 1983	14.0
