= Leigh Taylor-Young =

American actress (born 1945)

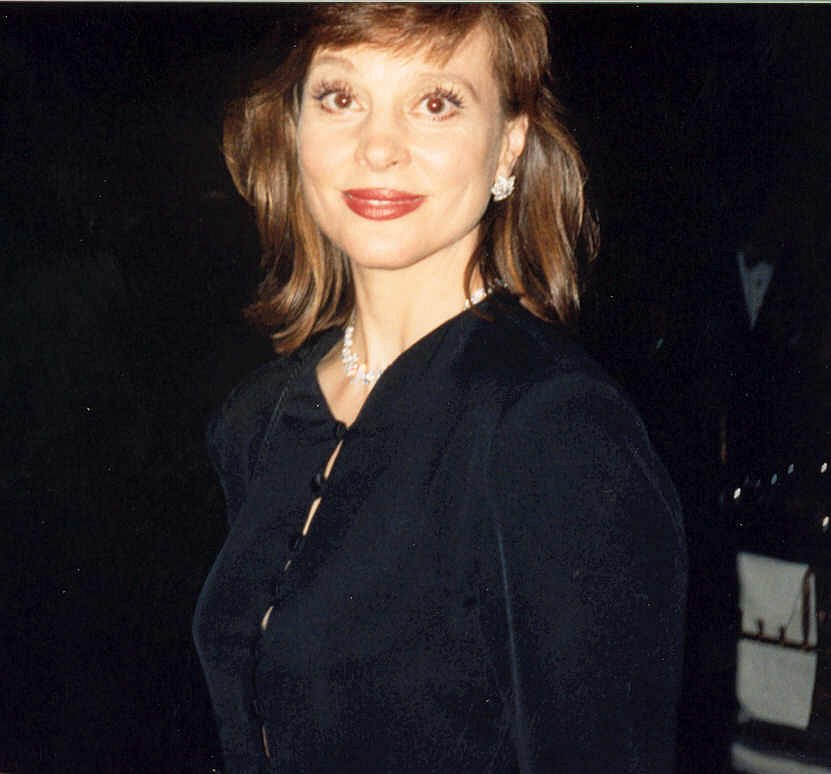
- Taylor-Young at the 1994 Emmy Awards
- Born: Leigh Taylor; January 25, 1945 (age 81); Washington, D.C., U.S.
- Other names: Leigh Young; Leigh Taylor Young
- Occupation: Actress
- Years active: 1966–present
- Spouses: Ryan O'Neal (m. 1967; div. 1974) Guy McElwaine (m. 1978; div. 1984) Craig Sheffer (m. 2003; div. 2004) John Morton (m. 2013)
- Children: Patrick O'Neal
- Website: www.lty.com

Leigh Taylor-Young (born January 25, 1945) is an American actress who has appeared on stage, screen, podcast, radio, and television. Her best-known films include I Love You, Alice B. Toklas (1968), The Horsemen (1971), The Gang That Couldn't Shoot Straight (1971), Soylent Green (1973), and Jagged Edge (1985). She won an Emmy for her role on the hit television series Picket Fences.

== Early life ==
Young was born on January 25, 1945, in Washington, D.C.. She graduated from a Detroit high school. Before attending Northwestern University as an economics major, she spent a summer shifting scenery, modeling, acting, and sweeping up at a Detroit little theater. She left Northwestern before graduating to pursue a full-time acting career, making her professional debut on Broadway in 3 Bags Full (1966). About dropping out of college, she said:

I left there because I lost the most wonderful teacher. I didn't want to go back when she left. My parents naturally were upset, and I spent four months at home thinking what to do, then went to New York.

== Career ==
=== 1960s ===
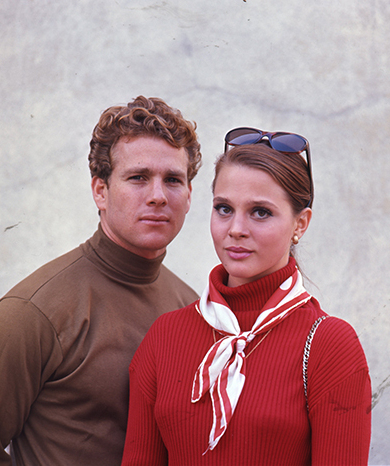
Ryan O'Neal with Taylor-Young in Peyton Place

Taylor-Young got her first big break in 1966, when she was cast as Rachel Welles on the primetime soap opera Peyton Place. Her character was written in the show as a replacement for the character of Allison MacKenzie, previously played by Mia Farrow. The series' producer, Everett Chambers, cast her because of her "great warmth and sweet angelic qualities not unlike Mia". When she received the role, Taylor-Young had been in California only a few days. She initially went there in April 1966 to recuperate from an attack of pneumonia. She impressed the head producer of Peyton Place, Paul Monash, with a performance from The Glass Menagerie and was immediately signed to a seven-year television and multiple-movie contract.

Shortly after, she told the press: "I'd have preferred to stay in New York to establish myself as an actress before coming to Hollywood."

It was on this series that she met Ryan O'Neal, whom she later married. Taylor-Young had difficulty working on the show, explaining in an April 1967 interview:

"When I got my first check for [3 Bags Full], I thought to myself, 'isn't this wonderful — being paid to have fun.' But after working in 70 chapters of Peyton Place out here in Hollywood, I'm glad to get my paycheck. I can now understand why good actors and actress[es] complain about going stale in television. It's difficult to give a character depth when there's a man with a stopwatch standing beside you complaining that the company is spending $3,000 a minute. Yes, I've learned that when you act in a TV series it becomes your whole life."

Despite the huge amount of publicity she received while working on Peyton Place, Taylor-Young left the soap opera in 1967 due to her pregnancy. She subsequently pursued a career in films, landing a lucrative seven-year contract with a major studio. Her first film role came opposite Peter Sellers in the comedy I Love You, Alice B. Toklas (1968). It was commercially successful, and she received a Golden Globe Award nomination for Most Promising Female Newcomer. She then appeared with husband Ryan O'Neal in The Big Bounce (1969).

=== 1970s ===
For the next several years, her pictures tended to be high-budget films, such as The Adventurers (1970), based on the novel by best-seller Harold Robbins; and The Horsemen, (1971) with leading man Omar Sharif. She is perhaps best known for her performance as Shirl, the "furniture" girl, in the science fiction classic Soylent Green (1973). After her appearance in Soylent Green, she made the professional decision to take a hiatus from acting in order to concentrate on raising her only child, son Patrick.

=== 1980s ===
The 1980s saw Taylor-Young return to both film and television, where her looks and voice often led to casting in roles of an aristocratic bent. In 1981, she appeared in the high technology Michael Crichton production Looker. In 1985, she was cast as Virginia Howell in Jagged Edge, and appeared in the romantic comedy Secret Admirer.

In addition to her film work, she guest-starred on such television series as McCloud, Fantasy Island, The Love Boat, Hart to Hart, Hotel and Spenser: For Hire. She returned to her soap opera roots in 1983, appearing in the short-lived primetime series The Hamptons. From 1987–89, she played Kimberly Cryder, a recurring character on Dallas, her first role in a major prime time soap since Peyton Place.

Despite being best known for her film and television work, she has stated a preference for live theater, where her career began. Favoring Samuel Beckett, she starred opposite Donald Davis in Beckett's one act play Catastrophe (included in a trilogy of one-act plays billed as The Beckett Plays) at the Edinburgh International Festival in 1984. She also toured Los Angeles, New York City and London with the show.

=== 1990s and 2000s ===
After 1990, Taylor-Young's film credits have included minor roles in Honeymoon Academy (1990), Bliss (1997) and Slackers (2002), as well as direct-to-video films Addams Family Reunion (1998), Klepto (2003), Spiritual Warriors (2007) and The Wayshower (2011).

Perhaps her best-known television work was on the CBS series Picket Fences, playing mercurial and cougar-ish mayor Rachel Harris from 1993–1995. She won an Emmy Award for the role in 1994, for Outstanding Supporting Actress in a Drama Series, and received a Golden Globe nomination the following year. From 2004–2007, she played Katherine Barrett Crane on the soap opera Passions.

Taylor-Young also appeared on TV series such as The Young Riders, Murder, She Wrote, Sunset Beach, Malibu Shores, 7th Heaven, Star Trek: Deep Space Nine and Life. She had recurring roles on Beverly Hills, 90210, The Pretender, and UPN's The Sentinel. She also appeared in a handful of television films, including Perry Mason: The Case of the Sinister Spirit (1987), Who Gets the Friends? and Stranger in My Home (1997).

== Personal life ==
Taylor-Young married Ryan O'Neal, her Peyton Place co-star, in 1967. Their wedding was spontaneous: While in Hawaii for a promotion for Peyton Place, an ABC manager offered them the opportunity to marry at his home. They were divorced in 1974. She married Guy McElwaine in 1978, and they were divorced in 1984.

She married John Morton in January 2013 at PRANA, headquarters of the Movement of Spiritual Inner Awareness in Los Angeles. She is an ordained minister in the Movement of Spiritual Inner Awareness, founded by John-Roger Hinkins and now led by her husband.

== Filmography ==
=== Film ===
| Year | Title | Role | Notes |
|---|---|---|---|
| 1968 | I Love You, Alice B. Toklas | Nancy | Nominated—Golden Globe Award for New Star of the Year – Actress |
| 1969 | The Big Bounce | Nancy Barker | |
| 1969 | Under the Yum Yum Tree | Jennifer | Television movie |
| 1969 | The Adventurers | Amparo Rojo | |
| 1970 | The Games | College Co-ed | Uncredited |
| 1970 | The Buttercup Chain | Manny | |
| 1971 | The Horsemen | Zareh | |
| 1971 | The Gang That Couldn't Shoot Straight | Angela | |
| 1973 | Soylent Green | Shirl | |
| 1980 | Marathon | Barrie | Television movie |
| 1980 | Can't Stop the Music | Claudia Walters | |
| 1981 | Looker | Jennifer Long | |
| 1985 | Secret Admirer | Elizabeth Fimple | |
| 1985 | Jagged Edge | Virginia Howell | |
| 1988 | Who Gets the Friends? | Aggie Harden | Television movie |
| 1989 | Accidents | Beryl Chambers | |
| 1990 | The Ghost Writer | Elizabeth Strack | Television movie |
| 1991 | Silverfox | Nita Davenport | Television movie |
| 1993 | Dreamrider | Dr. Sharon Kawai | |
| 1996 | An Unfinished Affair | Cynthia Connor | Television movie |
| 1996 | Mariette in Ecstasy | Narrator | |
| 1997 | Stranger In My Home | Margot | Television movie |
| 1997 | Bliss | Redhead | |
| 1998 | Addams Family Reunion | Patrice | Uncredited |
| 2002 | Slackers | Valerie Patton | |
| 2003 | Klepto | Teresa | |
| 2006 | Coffee Date | Diana | |
| 2007 | Dirty Laundry | Mrs. James | |
| 2011 | The Wayshower | Elva Hinkins | |

=== Television ===
| Year | Title | Role | Notes |
|---|---|---|---|
| 1966–1967 | Peyton Place | Rachel Welles | 70 episodes |
| 1976 | McCloud | Bonnie Foster | Episode: "Bonnie and McCloud" |
| 1978 | Fantasy Island | Leslie Tarleton | Episode: "I Want to Get Married" |
| 1978 | The Love Boat | Ann Sterling | Episode: "The Captain's Cup" |
| 1982 | Hart to Hart | Victoria Wilder | Episode: "Deep in the Hart of Dixieland" |
| 1982 | The Devlin Connection | Lauren Dane | 9 episodes |
| 1983 | Hotel | Carole Jamison | Episode: "Secrets" |
| 1983 | The Hamptons | Lee Chadway | Episode: "1.1" |
| 1985 | Hotel | Stephanie McMullen | Episode: "Identities" |
| 1986 | Spenser: For Hire | Alicia Carlisle | Episode: "Angel of Desolation" |
| 1986 | Hotel | Sharon Lockwood | Episode: "Pressure Points" |
| 1987–1989 | Dallas | Kimberly Cryder | 20 episodes |
| 1988 | Alfred Hitchcock Presents (1985 TV series) | Adelaide Walker | Episode: "Murder Party" |
| 1990 | Over My Dead Body | Linda Talmadge | Episode: "If Looks Could Kill" |
| 1991 | Evening Shade | Beck Kincaid | Episode: "Wood's Thirtieth Reunion" |
| 1992 | The Young Riders | Polly | Episode: "Lessons Learned" |
| 1992–1993 | Civil Wars | Unknown | 2 episodes |
| 1993–1995 | Picket Fences | Rachel Harris | 16 episodes Primetime Emmy Award for Outstanding Supporting Actress in a Drama Series; Nominated—Golden Globe Award for Best Supporting Actress – Series, Miniseries or Television Film; Nominated—Screen Actors Guild Award for Outstanding Performance by an Ensemble in a Drama Series |
| 1995 | Empty Nest | Gwen Langley | Episode: "Grandma, What Big Eyes You Have" |
| 1995 | JAG | Meredith | Episode: "A New Life - Part 1" |
| 1995 | Murder, She Wrote | Lainie Sherman Boswell | Episode: "A Quaking in Aspen" |
| 1996–1999 | The Sentinel | Naomi Sandburg | 3 episodes |
| 1996 | Malibu Shores | Mrs. Green | Episode: "The Competitive Edge" |
| 1997 | 7th Heaven | Nora Chambers | Episode: "Don't Take My Love Away" |
| 1997 | Rugrats | Story Reader | Episode: "Angelica Nose Best" |
| 1997 | Sunset Beach | Elaine Stevens | 109 episodes |
| 1998 | Beverly Hills, 90210 | Blythe Hunter | 3 episodes |
| 1998–1999 | The Pretender | Michelle Lucca Stamatis | 3 episodes |
| 1999 | Star Trek: Deep Space Nine | Yanas Tigan | Episode: "Prodigal Daughter" |
| 2003 | Strong Medicine | Catherine Beecher-Douglas | Episode: "Maternal Mirrors" |
| 2004–2007 | Passions | Katherine Barrett Crane | |
| 2007 | Life | Doreen Turner | Episode: "Tear Asunder" |
| 2022 | American Gigolo | Gail St. John | 2 episodes |
