= Stick (novel) =

1983 crime novel

- Original cover
- Author: Elmore Leonard
- Language: English
- Genre: Crime
- Published: 1983
- Publication place: United States

Stick is a 1983 crime novel written by Elmore Leonard.

The novel was adapted into a 1985 film of the same name starring and directed by Burt Reynolds. The New York Times wrote that the film adaptation of Stick was miscast by a director who should have known better, that being Reynolds himself.

== Plot summary ==
Recently released from prison, career criminal Ernest Stickley Jr. finds himself in Miami involved in a drug money deal that goes disastrously awry.

== Critical reception ==
The New York Times wrote, "When Mr. Leonard is observing, satirizing, plotting, working up suspense, thickening the air with menace, discharging it in lightning flashes of violence, exposing the black holes behind the parts people play - when he tends to business, that is, he gives us as much serious fun per word as anyone around."

A year-end roundup in The Washington Post listed Stick among notable 1983 titles.
