= The Big Bounce (1969 film) =

1969 film by Alex March

- Movie Poster
- Directed by: Alex March
- Screenplay by: Robert Dozier
- Based on: The Big Bounce by Elmore Leonard
- Produced by: William Dozier
- Starring: Ryan O'Neal; Leigh Taylor-Young; Van Heflin
- Cinematography: Howard Schwartz
- Edited by: William H. Ziegler
- Music by: Mike Curb
- Production company: Greenway Productions
- Distributed by: Warner Bros.-Seven Arts
- Release date: March 5, 1969
- Running time: 110 minutes
- Country: United States
- Language: English

The Big Bounce is a 1969 American drama film directed by Alex March, based on the 1969 novel of the same name by Elmore Leonard and starring Ryan O'Neal in his film debut, Van Heflin, and Leigh Taylor-Young in what was the first of several films based on Leonard's crime novels. Taylor-Young was nominated for a Laurel Award for her performance in the film. The film was shot on location in Monterey and Carmel, California.

The book was also adapted into a film in 2004 with the same name.

== Plot ==
Jack Ryan (Ryan O'Neal) quits his job as picker on a California farm after assaulting Comacho (Victor Paul), one of his Mexicano co-workers. Jack's boss orders him to leave town—which he intends to do, but not before visiting a local bar to wait for the next bus. While having a drink, Jack meets the town judge, Sam Mirakian (Van Heflin). Jack's honest but crusty attitude appeals to Sam, who offers him a job as handyman at his nearby motel. Jack accepts. At the motel, he cultivates a relationship with young, hot Nancy Barker (Leigh Taylor-Young), the secretary/mistress to Ray Ritchie (James Daly), a local agricultural magnate who has provided a spacious beach house for Nancy. She and Jack have several playful nighttime escapades along the beach, where she displays her penchant for antisocial and disruptive behavior. They soon become lovers. However, when her boss, Ray, orders Nancy to have sex with a senator in exchange for a business favor, she objects and realizes her stay at the beach house may soon end.

One evening, while Nancy takes Jack for a drive along a coastal highway outside of town, a pair of unruly teen-age boys in a dune-buggy attempt to hassle them off the road. But Nancy knows that game; she spitefully forces them into a violent mishap, seriously injuring them. The lovers, realizing potential problems with the law, abandon the scene without offering aid. The next morning, Judge Sam warns Jack off Nancy, whose behavior has become increasingly unstable and erratic. Later, Jack is relieved to learn that the two boys survived the highway wreck.

That evening at the beach house, while waiting for Jack, Nancy spies a man outside attempting to break in. She grabs a handgun and kills him. The intruder turns out to be Camacho. But when Jack comes upon the scene, he interrogates Nancy and correctly deduces that she intended to murder him, not Comacho. Dismissing his accusation, Nancy announces her intent to tell police that Camacho meant to harm her, so she shot him in self-defense. To strengthen her version of events, she goes on a destructive spree throughout the house. The authorities buy her story, and she is exonerated. However, Nancy and Jack decide to separate and leave town—for good.

== Cast ==
- Ryan O'Neal as Jack Ryan
- Leigh Taylor-Young as Nancy Barker
- Van Heflin as Sam Mirakian
- Lee Grant as Joanne
- James Daly as Ray Ritchie
- Robert Webber as Bob Rodgers
- Phyllis Davis as Bikini
- Noam Pitlik as Sam Turner
- Charles Cooper as Senator

== Production ==
Leonard sold the film rights to producer William Dozier, who owned Greenway Productions. Greenway signed a deal with Warner Bros.-Seven Arts in 1967 to provide a series of films, starting with The Big Bounce. Leonard stated, "The producer’s son [Robert Dozier] ended up writing the script. It was an awful movie, and that’s all I can say about it." In a letter to a colleague, Leonard called the script "a 1957 situation-TV script with dirty words. If this is their purpose, I can’t argue, but they could have saved money by dusting off an episode from Hawaiian Eye or 77 Sunset Strip and turning it into a feature. I think they’re missing an opportunity to do something interesting and different."

Ryan O'Neal and Leigh Taylor-Young were married at the time, both having been featured in ABC's popular prime-time serial Peyton Place. It was O'Neal's first lead role in a feature film. He made it while on summer hiatus from Peyton Place.

Filming started in August 1968. Exteriors were shot in Carmel and Monterey County.

== Critical reception ==
The film was not well received by critics. A.H. Weiler of The New York Times ends his review:

"Have you ever thought of doing something else?" Mr. Heflin asks our hero at one point. It's a question that could have been put to almost everyone concerned with The Big Bounce.

Elmore Leonard did not like the film and called it "the second-worst movie ever made" only behind the 2004 remake.

He saw the film in a theatre in New York while working on a script for The Moonshine War. Leonard says "Twenty minutes later, the woman in front of me said to the man she was with, ‘This is the worst picture I ever saw in my life.’ The three of us got up and left.”

== Cultural references ==
In his 2009 novel Inherent Vice, author Thomas Pynchon refers to Mike Curb's score from The Big Bounce as being "arguably the worst music track ever inflicted on a movie."

== See also ==
- List of American films of 1969
