= The Big Bounce (novel) =

1969 novel by Elmore Leonard

- First edition
- Author: Elmore Leonard
- Language: English
- Series: Jack Ryan
- Genre: Crime
- Publisher: Fawcett Gold Medal
- Publication date: 1969
- Publication place: USA
- Pages: 192
- ISBN: 9780060084028
- Followed by: Unknown Man No. 89

The Big Bounce is a crime novel written by Elmore Leonard, published in 1969.

The author's first attempt at the crime genre after having met success with westerns, it was adapted twice into film. It is also Leonard's first book starring the character of Jack Ryan (no relation to Tom Clancy's character of the same name), who would return eight years later in Unknown Man No. 89.

== Plot summary ==
Jack Ryan, a drifter and small-time delinquent, arrives at the Thumb area of Michigan as a seasonal farm laborer, picking pickles for food tycoon Ray Ritchie. He soon gets involved with Nancy, a young seductress, currently Ray Ritchie's girlfriend, though she is also cheating on him with another man, Bob Jr. For a while, Ryan and Nancy get their thrills smashing windows and breaking and entering, but Ryan soon gets a shot at settling down with the help of justice of the peace Mr. Majestyk, who hires Jack as a handyman at his beach resort. When Nancy grows bored with housebreaking and burglary and conceives a plan to steal the laborers' payroll, Ryan must choose between following her in her chase for "the big bounce" or the stability of an honest life.

== Background ==
Leonard started offering the story to publishers and film producers in the fall of 1966. However, no one would touch it until 1969, when it was first adapted to the screen. While the screenplay is credited as an adaptation of the novel, the movie came out earlier.

== Film adaptations ==
The novel was first turned into a film in 1969, directed by Alex March and scripted by Robert Dozier, starring Ryan O'Neal as Ryan and Leigh Taylor-Young as Nancy. It was a box office and critical disaster, which did not help the book's popularity. The novel went largely unnoticed until Leonard was "discovered" in the 1980s. Praise from filmmakers like Quentin Tarantino, along with a successful film adaptation of Get Shorty by director Barry Sonnenfeld in 1995, helped Leonard gain a new generation of fans.

In 2004, a second film adaptation was released. Despite a cast of big-name stars like Owen Wilson, Sara Foster, Morgan Freeman, and Charlie Sheen, it was also a flop, receiving negative reviews from both critics and audiences.

Leonard memorably described the 1969 movie as the "second-worst movie ever made", with the 2004 version being the worst.

== Tie-ins ==
In one scene in the novel, the two main characters watch part of a western movie on TV through an outside window. The movie is Budd Boetticher's The Tall T, which was based on Elmore Leonard's story "The Captives."

Jack Ryan returned in the novel Unknown Man No. 89.

The title character in the 1974 action film Mr. Majestyk, written and later novelized by Leonard and starring Charles Bronson, borrows his name from this novel; however, there seems to be no further relation between both characters.
