= Craig Sheffer =

American actor (b. 1960)

- Born: Craig Eric Sheffer; April 23, 1960 (age 66); York, Pennsylvania, U.S.
- Education: East Stroudsburg University of Pennsylvania
- Occupation: Actor
- Years active: 1982–present
- Partner: Gabrielle Anwar (ended 1990s)

Craig Eric Sheffer (born April 23, 1960) is an American film and television actor. He is known for his starring roles as Hardy Jenns in Some Kind of Wonderful (1987), Aaron "Cabal" Boone in Nightbreed (1990), Norman Maclean in A River Runs Through It (1992), Joe Kane in The Program (1993), Joseph in Bliss (1997), and as Keith Scott on the television series One Tree Hill (2003–12).

== Early life ==
Sheffer was born in York, Pennsylvania, where his father worked as a prison guard. He began acting in school plays while attending York Suburban Senior High School, competing in regional and state drama competitions. He attended East Stroudsburg University of Pennsylvania for two years on a sports scholarship, playing baseball and football, until sustaining a knee injury. He dropped out in 1980 to pursue his acting career.

Sheffer moved to New York City at the behest of his then-girlfriend, but they broke up shortly thereafter, and Sheffer spent some time homeless. He "slept under the marble staircase" in Grand Central Terminal for weeks while living off Unification Church spaghetti dinners, and made a living selling newspapers.

== Career ==
After appearing in commercials, Sheffer was first seen on a nationwide basis as Ian Hayden on the ABC daytime soap opera One Life to Live in 1982, and on the short-lived primetime drama The Hamptons in 1983. In 1984, he was cast in his first film role, as the romantic lead opposite Pia Zadora in the genre-bending musical Voyage of the Rock Aliens. He also starred in the Broadway play Torch Song Trilogy, replacing Paul Joynt midway through its run.

He subsequently had starring roles in films as the best friend of troubled teenager Emilio Estevez in That Was Then... This Is Now (1985), a reformatory camp inmate in Fire with Fire (1986), an antagonistic rich kid in Some Kind of Wonderful (1987), and the romantic love interest of an overweight cosmetician in Baby Cakes (1989). In 1990, he played the leading role of Aaron "Cabal" Boone in Clive Barker's horror film Nightbreed.

In 1992, Sheffer starred as author Norman Maclean in the Oscar-winning biographical film A River Runs Through It, directed by Robert Redford. He then played Heisman Trophy candidate quarterback Joe Kane in The Program in 1993.

Sheffer's other films include Fire in the Sky (1993), Head Above Water (1996) and Sleep With Me (1994) (as the apex of a romantic triangle which included Eric Stoltz, and Meg Tilly). Sheffer played the leading role in Clive Barker's franchise sequel, Hellraiser: Inferno. He also played the main character in 1997's Bliss which starred Sheryl Lee, Terence Stamp and Leigh Taylor-Young.

Sheffer played Constant Bradley in the 1996 miniseries A Season in Purgatory. He played Keith Scott on the CW Network series One Tree Hill for three seasons before his character was killed off halfway through season 3 (he also had several guest appearances in season 4). He directed the feature film American Crude, a dark comedy starring Ron Livingston and Rob Schneider; it was released straight to DVD in June 2008. Sheffer had a cameo appearance in the movie Stand Up Guys.

In 2016, Sheffer starred alongside Steven Seagal in Code of Honor.

In 2021, he was cast to play American President Richard Nixon on the horror anthology American Horror Story: Double Feature.

== Personal life ==
Sheffer was in a relationship with Gabrielle Anwar from 1989 until the early-1990s and they have a daughter born in 1993. Sheffer is the godfather to his ex-partner's children, Hugo and Paisley, from her subsequent marriage to John Verea.

== Filmography ==
=== Film ===
Year	Title	Role	Notes
1984	Voyage of the Rock Aliens	Frankie	
1985	That Was Then... This Is Now	Bryon Douglas	
1986	Fire with Fire	Joe Fisk	
1987	Some Kind of Wonderful	Hardy Jenns	
1988	Split Decisions	Eddie McGuinn	
1990	Nightbreed	Aaron Boone / Cabal	
1990	Instant Karma	Zane	
1991	Blue Desert	Randall Atkins	
1991	Eye of the Storm	Ray	
1992	A River Runs Through It	Norman Maclean	
1993	Fire in the Sky	Allan Dallis	
1993	The Program	Joe Kane	
1993	Fire on the Amazon	RJ O'Brien	
1994	The Road Killers	Cliff	
1994	Sleep with Me	Frank	
1995	Wings of Courage	Henri Guillaumet	Short film
1995	The Desperate Trail	Jack Cooper	
1996	The Grave	King	
1996	Head Above Water	Lance	
1997	Executive Power	Nick Seger	
1997	Bliss	Joseph	
1998	Double Take	Connor McEwen	
1999	The Fall	Adam Ellis	
1999	Flypaper	Bobby Ray	
1999	Turbulence 2: Fear of Flying	Martin	
2000	Net Worth	Woody Miller	
2000	Deep Core	Brian Goodman	
2000	Hellraiser: Inferno	Det. Joseph Thorne	
2000	Maze	Mike	
2000	Merlin: The Return	Mordred	
2001	Ritual	Paul Claybourne	
2001	Turbulence 3: Heavy Metal	Nick Watts	
2001	Flying Virus	Martin Bauer	
2002	Truth Be Told	Det. Stratten	
2002	Deadly Little Secrets	Dr. Gordon Childs	
2003	Water Under the Bridge	Marco	
2003	Dracula II: Ascension	Lowell	
2004	Prodigal Son	Alan	Short film
2004	The Pavilion	Frank Cassilis	
2004	Berserker	Boar	
2005	Tom's Nu Heaven	Tom Mitchell	
2005	The Second Front	Frank Hossom	
2006	Find Love	Interviewer	
2008	Love Lies Bleeding	Morton	
2008	While She Was Out	Kenneth	
2010	Ashley's Ashes	Bill	
2012	Bad Ass	Attorney	
2012	Stand Up Guys	Jargoniew	
2012	The Mark	Chad Turner	
2013	The Mark 2: Redemption	Chad Turner	
2016	Code of Honor	William Porter	
2017	Destruction: Los Angeles	John Benson	
2019	Widow's Point	Thomas Livingston	
2023	Velocity Girl	Sheriff Earl Gentry	
2024	Guns & Moses	Tibor Farkas	

=== Television ===
Year	Title	Role	Notes
1982	One Life to Live	Ian Hayden	Unknown episodes
1983	The Hamptons	Brian Chadway	Episode: "Pilot"
1986–88	Teen Wolf	Mick (voice)	21 episodes
1989	Baby Cakes	Rob	Television film
1995	In Pursuit of Honor	Lt. Marshall Buxton	Television film
1995	Bloodknot	Mike	Television film
1996	A Season in Purgatory	Constant Bradley	Miniseries
1997	Miss Evers' Boys	Dr. Douglas	Television film
1997	Merry Christmas, George Bailey	Ernie Bishop / Ed / Bridgekeeper	Television film
1998	Rhapsody in Bloom	Jack Safrenek	Television film
2001	Family Law	Martin Antenelli	Episode: "Separation"
2002	Fastlane	Andrew Kane	Episode: "Pilot"
2002	Cabin Pressure	Peter 'Bird Dog' Dewmont	Television film
2003	Without Malice	Dr. Paul Venters	Television film
2003–07, 2012	One Tree Hill	Keith Scott	58 episodes
2005	Into the West	Older Robert Wheeler	Episode: "Ghost Dance"
2006	Long Lost Son	Quinn Halloran / John Williams	Television film
2010	Psych	Federal Marshal Daniel Wayne	Episode: "A Very Juliet Episode"
2010	Criminal Minds	James Thomas	Episode: "Compromising Positions"
2010	Lies Between Friends	Sheriff Zach Watts	Television film
2012	The Mentalist	Gary Philo	Episode: "Cheap Burgundy"
2012	CSI: Crime Scene Investigation	Jack Gilmore	2 episodes
2013	Battledogs	Major Brian Hoffman	Television film
2021	American Horror Story: Double Feature	Richard Nixon	3 episodes
