= The Oklahoma Wildman =

- Justified: City Primeval episode
- Episode no.: Episode 2
- Directed by: Michael Dinner
- Written by: Dave Andron; Michael Dinner
- Cinematography by: John Lindley
- Editing by: Hunter M. Via
- Original release date: July 18, 2023
- Running time: 51 minutes

Guest appearances
- Paul Calderón as Detective Raymond Cruz (special guest star); Ravi V. Patel as Rick Newley; Joseph Anthony Byrd as Trennell; Vivian Olyphant as Willa Givens

Episode chronology
← Previous "City Primeval"	Next → "Backstabbers"

"The Oklahoma Wildman" is the second episode of the American television miniseries Justified: City Primeval, a continuation of the series Justified. The episode was written by series developers Dave Andron and Michael Dinner, and directed by Dinner. It originally aired on FX on July 18, 2023, airing back-to-back with the previous episode "City Primeval".

The series is set 15 years after the original series finale, and follows Raylan Givens, who now resides in Miami. He continues working as a U.S. Marshal while helping raise his daughter, Willa. However, he soon finds himself in Detroit when a criminal, Clement Mansell, starts wreaking havoc. In the episode, Raylan investigates the Judge's death, while Mansell asks Sandy for a favor.

According to Nielsen Media Research, the episode was seen by an estimated 0.848 million household viewers and gained a 0.13 ratings share among adults aged 18–49. The episode received mostly positive reviews, with critics praising the performances (particularly Boyd Holbrook), character development and writing.

== Plot ==
In 2017, Mansell (Boyd Holbrook) robs a crew of drug dealers at their house, with the help of Sweety (Vondie Curtis-Hall). After retrieving the money, Mansell kills the dealers and flees with Sweety. Three days later, Mansell is arrested when one of the dealers survives and identifies him. In prison, Mansell is visited by Carolyn (Aunjanue Ellis), who says she will represent him as his lawyer.

In present day, Raylan (Timothy Olyphant) and Wendell (Victor Williams) visit Sandy (Adelaide Clemens) at her penthouse. The penthouse belongs to a person known as Del Weems, and Weems' car was the one that Mansell drove the previous night. Sandy claims to have driven the car and having an incident. As she asks them to leave, Wendell recognizes her as the person who was with Mansell on the night of his arrest. After they leave, Mansell asks Sandy to drop the incriminating gun into the River Rouge. She leaves, unaware that she is being followed by Raylan and Wendell. At the River Rouge, she cannot bring herself to throw it in, so she hides it in the ceiling of Sweety's bar's restroom.

Raylan is summoned to Carolyn's office, where he is introduced to Mansell. She warns him to stop investigating any further, although Raylan notes something is off about her behavior when Mansell leaves her office. He and Wendell go to see Sandy at the casino, with Raylan warning her that he knows she ran around the city for Mansell. As they leave, Sandy calls Mansell to tell him about the events. Raylan and Wendell visit Sweety's bar to question him about the weapon. Sweety then shows them three registered firearms he has on the counter, and calls Carolyn to confront them over harassing him. Raylan returns to the hotel, finding Willa dining with Mansell. He takes Mansell outside and brutally attacks him, warning him that he will kill him if he gets near Willa again. A terrified Willa is shown to have witnessed the event.

== Production ==
=== Development ===
In June 2023, FX announced that the second episode of the series would be titled "The Oklahoma Wildman", and was to be written by series developers Dave Andron and Michael Dinner and directed by Dinner. This was Andron's second writing credit, Dinner's second writing credit, and Dinner's second directing credit.

=== Writing ===
Adelaide Clemens described Mansell's and Sandy's relationship as depicted in the episode as "I think she tells herself that she's in love with him, and I think she believes she's in love with him. It's also clear she doesn't have many people in the world. She grew up in the underbelly of Detroit, and so loyalty is very important in that world. And I think she made the decision at some point that she was going to be loyal to Clement. And what happens is the more afraid she becomes of him, the more she starts convincing herself that she's in love with him, and that it's true love."

== Reception ==
=== Viewers ===
In its original American broadcast, "The Oklahoma Wildman" was seen by an estimated 0.848 million household viewers and gained a 0.13 ratings share among adults aged 18–49, according to Nielsen Media Research. This means that 0.13 percent of all households with televisions watched the episode. This was a massive 72% increase in viewership from the previous episode, which was watched by 0.493 million viewers with a 0.05 in the 18-49 demographics.

=== Critical reviews ===
"The Oklahoma Wildman" received mostly positive reviews from critics. Ben Travers of IndieWire wrote, "The first two episodes dole out critical (and plentiful) exposition without sacrificing forward momentum. There’s so much action in these initial hours that the car bomb plot is barely an afterthought by the time the final credits roll."

Roxana Hadadi of Vulture gave the episode a 3 star rating out of 5 and wrote, "A lot of questions are raised by this episode, but this is what we know: Clement has pissed Raylan off. In that first meeting between the two, Olyphant does a great job making Raylan seem reassured by, almost gleeful about, what a jerk Clement turns out to be; this is a man he can hate, a man who deserves to, after years of getting away with crime and violence and destruction, get taken down."

Cameron Crain of TV Obsessive wrote, "The stakes of Justified: City Primeval thus seem to be set coming out of Episode 2. The question is going to be how Raylan can get the upper hand on Clement, and how (or if) he can manage the legal fallout. Dollars to doughnuts, he's going to shoot that man dead at some point." Diana Keng of TV Fanatic gave the episode a 3.5 star rating out of 5 and wrote, "We're a long way and a long time from Harlan County, folks. Justified: City Primeval sets up our favorite U.S. Marshall for an intense new case, but it's not just the criminal who's new and different. The fifteen years that have elapsed have mellowed Raylan Givens, and fatherhood has clearly taught him some anger management strategies that hunting criminals never drove home."
