= City Primeval (Justified: City Primeval) =

- Justified: City Primeval episode
- Episode no.: Episode 1
- Directed by: Michael Dinner
- Teleplay by: Dave Andron; Michael Dinner
- Cinematography by: John Lindley
- Editing by: Hunter M. Via
- Original release date: July 18, 2023
- Running time: 52 minutes

Guest appearances
- Keith David as Judge Alvin Guy (special guest star); Amin Joseph as Jamal; Ravi V. Patel as Rick Newley; Kenn E. Head as Lou Whitman; Vivian Olyphant as Willa Givens; Alexander Pobutsky as Skender Lulgjuraj; Regina Taylor as Diane; Ian Bratschie as Barry Tenderbock; Rae Gray as Rose Doyle; Jalen Gilbert as Tyrone Power; Marc Grapey as Prosecutor; Jeanette O'Connor as Ms. Tenderbock

Episode chronology
← Previous "The Promise"	Next → "The Oklahoma Wildman"

"City Primeval" is the first episode of the American television miniseries Justified: City Primeval, a continuation of the series Justified. The episode was written by series developers Dave Andron and Michael Dinner, and directed by Dinner. It originally aired on FX on July 18, 2023, airing back-to-back with the follow-up episode "The Oklahoma Wildman".

The series is set 15 years after the original series finale, and follows Raylan Givens, who now resides in Miami. He continues working as a U.S. Marshal while helping raise his daughter, Willa. However, he soon finds himself in Detroit when a criminal, Clement Mansell, starts wreaking havoc.

According to Nielsen Media Research, the episode was seen by an estimated 0.493 million household viewers and gained a 0.05 ratings share among adults aged 18–49. The premiere received mostly positive reviews from critics, who praised the new storylines, characters and performances.

== Plot ==
In the Everglades, Raylan (Timothy Olyphant) is driving his daughter Willa (Vivian Olyphant) to camp, which she is reluctantly attending following a series of disciplinary issues. On the way, they are rammed off the road by a pickup truck and confronted by two fugitives who attempt to steal Raylan's car. Raylan surprises them by covertly pulling a shotgun from the trunk, flattening their tires, and arresting them after showing his badge.

Outside of Detroit, Clement Mansell (Boyd Holbrook) steals a car from a gas station and drives into the city. Elsewhere in Detroit, Alvin Guy (Keith David), a judge for the Third Circuit Judicial Court of Wayne County, survives an assassination attempt after his car explodes in his driveway. In spite of the threat, the Judge proceeds to court where he is presiding over the trial of Tyrone Power (Jalen Gilbert), who was fleeing warrants in Michigan when he attempted to steal Raylan's car. Raylan himself testifies as a witness to Tyrone's crimes in Florida, but is cross-examined by defense attorney Carolyn Wilder (Aunjanue Ellis), who interrogates him over his perceived hostility and alleged mistreatment of the fugitives. Willa, seated in the gallery, occasionally interrupts the court proceedings with laughter. Eventually losing patience with Raylan and his daughter, the Judge drops Tyrone's charges from Florida, and remands both Givens to the bailiff. They are released from the court holding cell by Chief Deputy Marshal Lou Whitman (Kenn E. Head).

At the Detroit Marshal's Office, Whitman informs Raylan that despite the events of the trial, he has been personally requested by Judge Guy to assist with the investigation of his assassination attempt. Assured that the investigation would take no more than 24 hours, Raylan reluctantly sets aside his father-daughter road trip with Willa and joins the Detroit Police Department task-force, headed by detective Wendell Robinson (Victor Williams) and his partners, Norbert Bryl (Norbert Leo Butz) and Maureen Downey (Marin Ireland). Meanwhile, Mansell arrives at a Detroit casino and reunites with his girlfriend, waitress Sandy Stanton (Adelaide Clemens); later, they discuss a plan to rob an Albanian gambler named Skender Lulgjuraj (Alexander Pobutsky) and, potentially, an associate named Del Reems. At a neighborhood bar, Wilder meets her ex-husband and former law partner Jamal (Amin Joseph) to discuss the fallout of their separation. As she leaves, Wilder confides in the bartender, Marcus "Sweetie" Sweeton (Vondie Curtis-Hall). The conversation is ended by a phone call for Sweetie, who appears worried when Mansell answers.

Following a lead on Judge Guy's would-be assassins, Raylan and the Detroit PD team raid a house in Armada where the suspects are found; after a brief chase, one of the suspects is apprehended while the other, Barry Tenderbock (Ian Bratschie), escapes. Learning that the motive was retaliation against Judge Guy for having taken sexual liberties with Barry's mother following a trial in which he handed Barry a maximum sentence, the team confronts the Judge in exchange for identifying the mother. Barry visits his mother, who unbeknownst to him has already called the police, and is apprehended after taking her hostage.

Mansell meets with Sandy at Sweetie's bar, where he retrieves a hidden gun from the bathroom. Returning to the casino as a patron, Sandy finds Skender Lulgjuraj and seduces him. As they leave the casino in Lulgjuraj's car, Mansell attempts to follow them out, but is inadvertently cut off in the parking garage by another car, coincidentally driven by Judge Guy with his assistant, Rose (Rae Gray). Both angered, Mansell and Judge Guy continue to cut each other off through the streets of Detroit as Mansell attempts to tail Lulgjurag and Sandy. Mansell eventually loses Lulgjuraj and, frustrated, gives chase to the Judge, eventually ramming his car as they emerge from an alley. As the Judge reaches for his gun, Mansell shoots and kills him through the windshield; rummaging through the Judge's coat, he takes a small brown notebook, and drives off with Rose as hostage. Rose flees the car at an intersection, but is followed and shot in the back by Mansell in Palmer Park. Soon after, Raylan and the Detroit PD team are called to the scene of the Judge's murder. Upon finding Rose's body, Maureen mournfully reveals that Rose was her confidential informant for an investigation of Judge Guy, and had joined the Judge at the casino that evening on her orders. Raylan returns to his hotel room, and gazes solemnly at Willa as she sleeps.

== Production ==
=== Development ===
In March 2023, FX announced that the first episode of the series would be titled "City Primeval", and was to be written by series developers Dave Andron and Michael Dinner and directed by Dinner.

=== Writing ===
Michael Dinner explained that it was pivotal to show character growth in Raylan, explaining "He's such an Elmore character. They don't make huge leaps; they move incrementally, and I think that's what happens in the new series. He gave up the ghost of his past in the first series. He's moving another couple inches forward now, and there's a third chapter."

Dave Andron described Clement Mansell as "He's one of the great bad guys that Elmore created. Crazy or unpredictable is a good description. And the great thing about Elmore's bad guys is that sometimes they're redeemable or embraceable, and sometimes they're just so interesting, and I find this guy interesting. I don't know what he's gonna do next. That's what makes him scary. The question for Raylan is, existentially, has he slowed down?"

=== Filming ===
For the scene where Raylan arrives at the crime scene, Dinner wanted to diffentiate it from the previous scenes by making an unbroken take. He explained, "As a director, you have to find a rhythm, and if you've been in a sequence that's coverage heavy with no shot lasting longer than a second, it gives you permission to do something different in the next scene. You don't want to get lulled into a pace that's the same from scene to scene."

== Reception ==
=== Viewers ===
In its original American broadcast, "City Primeval" was seen by an estimated 0.493 million household viewers and gained a 0.05 ratings share among adults aged 18–49, according to Nielsen Media Research. This means that 0.05 percent of all households with televisions watched the episode. This was a 78% decrease in viewership from the original series finale, which was watched by 2.24 million viewers with a 0.7 in the 18-49 demographics.

=== Critical reviews ===
"City Primeval" received mostly positive reviews from critics. Ben Travers of IndieWire wrote, "Justified: City Primeval wastes little time throwing Raylan back into the thick of things, which is about the same amount of time it spends pretending all that much has changed. Sure, he's based in Florida, which is where he was first based when Justified started. But even as it brings us up to speed on Raylan's life, the opening scene predominantly speaks to the lingering demons our favorite U.S. Marshal has yet to quell."

Roxana Hadadi of Vulture gave the episode a 4 star rating out of 5 and wrote, "Fifteen years after the pre-time-jump events of the Justified series finale 'The Promise,' Raylan still has that inquiring mind and that chip on his shoulder, and he still won't let himself be intimidated or pushed around... at least not by criminals. His 15-year-old daughter, Willa, though? Or lawyer Carolyn Wilder or judge Alvin Guy? They have Raylan's number either emotionally or legally, and by the end of premiere City Primeval, their prickly, contentious relationships with Raylan lay down some narrative avenues for where this series will go. Giddyup!"

Cameron Crain of TV Obsessive wrote, "The chaos of that setup makes Episode 1 of Justified: City Primeval feel more like Justified than anything else." Diana Keng of TV Fanatic gave the episode a 3.5 star rating out of 5 and wrote, "Clement is a villain fashioned after Batman's Joker. A capable criminal who understands how to leverage information and has no qualms about utilizing extreme brutality to expedite his goals, he is a creature of mercurial moods and motivations. The issue with chaotic evil like that is the unpredictability of his actions gets tedious. The savagery is shocking and the sadism disturbing, but it's a one-note type of discord."
