= Adios (Justified: City Primeval) =

- Justified: City Primeval episode
- Episode no.: Episode 6
- Directed by: Sylvain White
- Written by: Taylor Elmore; V.J. Boyd
- Cinematography by: John Lindley
- Editing by: Hunter M. Via
- Original air date: August 15, 2023
- Running time: 48 minutes

Guest appearances
- David Cross as Burt Dickey (special guest star); Kevin Anderson as Lonnie; Regina Taylor as Diane Rogers; Joseph Anthony Byrd as Trennell; Neal Dandade as Art Owner

Episode chronology
← Previous "You Good?"	Next → "The Smoking Gun"

"Adios" is the sixth episode of the American television miniseries Justified: City Primeval, a continuation of the series Justified. The episode was written by executive producers Taylor Elmore and V.J. Boyd, and directed by Sylvain White. It originally aired on FX on August 15, 2023.

The series is set 15 years after the original series finale, and follows Raylan Givens, who now resides in Miami. He continues working as a U.S. Marshal while helping raise his daughter, Willa. However, he soon finds himself in Detroit when a criminal, Clement Mansell, starts wreaking havoc. In the episode, Raylan and Downey set up a trap for Mansell, while Sweety decides to take care of Mansell.

According to Nielsen Media Research, the episode was seen by an estimated 0.665 million household viewers and gained a 0.11 ratings share among adults aged 18–49. The episode received generally positive reviews from critics, who praised the performances (particularly Vondie Curtis-Hall) and ending, although the writing and pacing received criticism.

== Plot ==
Raylan (Timothy Olyphant) is visited by Carolyn (Aunjanue Ellis), who reveals that she saw the Judge's book, and found some of the targets. Somewhere, Dickey (David Cross) visits a friend, Lonnie (Kevin Anderson), hiring him into taking back the painting that Mansell (Boyd Holbrook) took from his house.

Mansell and Sweety (Vondie Curtis-Hall) meet at a parking garage with another person in the book. However, the man only has $12,000 instead of the $15,000 they asked. When Mansell rams his car, the man flees and accidentally falls off the building to his death. Raylan talks to Downey (Marin Ireland) about getting to know about the book, with Downey correctly deducing he slept with Carolyn. They meet with prosecutor Diane (Regina Taylor), blackmailing her into working with them. As her name is in the book, she will be part of a trap set for Mansell and Sweety, or she will be exposed for taking bribes.

Lonnie arrives at Sweety's Tavern, forcing Sweety to leave Mansell's penthouse to meet him. Their meeting is interrupted when Sweety is called by Diane, who offers $30,000 to get her name removed from the book, agreeing to meet later. Sweety also gives up Mansell's name to Lonnie, instructing him that Mansell must be killed while Sweety himself gets the painting for him. Sweety tricks Mansell into going to the meeting alone, although Sandy (Adelaide Clemens) is revealed to have taken the painting to sell it.

At the park, Mansell meets with Diane, with the task force watching nearby. When Mansell confirms the blackmail, the task force starts moving in. They arrest Mansell, while Lonnie is forced to continue walking, unable to kill Mansell. However, Downey discovers that Mansell does not have the book with him, so they are forced to release him. On the car with Wendell (Victor Williams), Raylan questions how Mansell gets extremely lucky in getting away with everything. At Sweety's, Sweety and Lonnie are interrupted when Mansell arrives. As Lonnie is called by Dickey, Mansell kills him with a gunshot. He then forces Sweety to unplug his jukebox so he can play his own stereo. Sweety tries to reach the gun he hid, but finds that the gun is not there. He eventually confronts Mansell, affirming he won't stand up for his actions. Mansell then shoots him in the chest, killing him. With the liquor, Mansell sets the tavern on fire and escapes.

== Production ==
=== Development ===
In July 2023, FX announced that the sixth episode of the series would be titled "Adios", and was to be written by executive producers Taylor Elmore and V.J. Boyd, and directed by Sylvain White. This was Elmore's second writing credit, Boyd's first writing credit, and White's first directing credit.

== Reception ==
=== Viewers ===
In its original American broadcast, "Adios" was seen by an estimated 0.665 million household viewers and gained a 0.11 ratings share among adults aged 18–49, according to Nielsen Media Research. This means that 0.11 percent of all households with televisions watched the episode. This was a 16% increase in viewership from the previous episode, which was watched by 0.573 million viewers with a 0.06 in the 18-49 demographics.

=== Critical reviews ===
"Adios" received generally positive reviews from critics. Ben Travers of IndieWire gave the episode a "B+" grade and wrote, "That's more good luck for Clement, but more bad luck for Raylan, who must be wondering, now more than ever, if the Wildman is actually right — about one thing, at least. Maybe the only way to lasso this bull is with a noose."

Roxana Hadadi of Vulture gave the episode a 2 star rating out of 5 and wrote, "'You Good?' was the best episode of Justified: City Primeval so far, a showcase for Aunjanue Ellis and Timothy Olyphant's chemistry; a smart, sexy hour that let them jab at each other’s outer shells; and a long-awaited explanation for why Sweety bothered continuing to spend time with Clement. 'Adios' veers away from those elements, and I get it: Episodes of TV cannot be exactly alike. But this installment spent too much time with the series' weakest characters (the Detroit Police Department) and lacked the sense of urgency I would assume we should be leaning into with only three episodes of this miniseries left."

Caemeron Crain of TV Obsessive wrote, "It was easy enough to guess from the episode title that 'Adios' would see the death of a major character in this story, but I am sad to see Sweety go. I guess in retrospect, he should have taken Carolyn's offer to testify against Clement rather than trying to play his own game, but it's hard to fault him." Diana Keng of TV Fanatic gave the episode a 3.5 star rating out of 5 and wrote, "One can't help but sense the doom looming on 'Adios'. Raylan articulates it as a feeling of being played the fool. Clement sees it as a sign he needs to take control. Sweetie faces it head-on and takes it point blank."

=== Accolades ===
TVLine named Boyd Holbrook as an honorable mention as the "Performer of the Week" for the week of August 19, 2023, for his performance in the episode. The site wrote, "With that not-at-all-veiled challenge, Justified: City Primeval's Clement Mansell set the stage for the limited series' final two episodes, and Boyd Holbrook in turn slipped into some of his stone-coldest, scariest moments yet as Raylan's nemesis. Having eluded the police sting in the park, Mansell got up in Raylan's face and all but called for guns drawn at dawn. And throughout that intense exchange, Holbrook dialed down Mansell's jokier persona to meet Timothy Olyphant steely glare for steely glare. Later, when Mansell confronted Sweety and invited his partner in crime to 'kill the jukebox' and give his 'Seven Nation Army' cover a listen with 'those big ears,' Holbrook erased any whiff of camaraderie, sending a chill down our spine — while assuring Sweety that his fate was sealed."
