= The Question (Justified: City Primeval) =

- Justified: City Primeval episode
- Episode no.: Episode 8
- Directed by: Michael Dinner
- Teleplay by: Dave Andron; Michael Dinner
- Cinematography by: Jeffrey Greeley
- Editing by: Hunter M. Via
- Original air date: August 29, 2023
- Running time: 45 minutes

Guest appearances
- Walton Goggins as Boyd Crowder (special guest star); Natalie Zea as Winona Hawkins (special guest star); Terry Kinney as Toma Costia (special guest star); Luis Guzmán as Officer Ramirez (special guest star); Ahna O'Reilly as Officer Charlene Gerret; Matt Craven as Chief Deputy U.S. Marshal Dan Grant; Dominic Fumusa as Bone Downey; Yosef Kasnetzkov as Besnik Darke; David Koechner as Deputy Greg Sutter; Alexander Pobutsky as Skender Lulgjuraj; Vivian Olyphant as Willa Givens; Audrey Francis as Lieutenant Governor; F. David Roth as Internal Affairs Hardass

Episode chronology
← Previous "The Smoking Gun"	Next → —

"The Question" is the eighth and final episode of the American television miniseries Justified: City Primeval, a continuation of the series Justified. The episode was written by series developers Dave Andron and Michael Dinner, and directed by Dinner. It originally aired on FX on August 29, 2023.

The series is set 15 years after the original series finale, and follows Raylan Givens, who now resides in Miami. He continues working as a U.S. Marshal while helping raise his daughter, Willa. However, he soon finds himself in Detroit when a criminal, Clement Mansell, starts wreaking havoc. In the episode, Raylan sets to stop Mansell once and for all.

According to Nielsen Media Research, the episode was seen by an estimated 0.670 million household viewers and gained a 0.08 ratings share among adults aged 18–49. The episode received generally positive reviews from critics, with particular praise towards the ending and performances, although the resolution to the main story polarized critics.

== Plot ==
Raylan and Mansell (Boyd Holbrook) are taken to Skender's basement, where Toma Costia (Terry Kinney) and Carolyn (Aunjanue Ellis) await for them. Carolyn reveals she made a deal with the Albanians to end the conflict. For this, the Albanians place Mansell into Skender's bunker and then lock him inside. Costia tells Raylan that he is free to go, stating that while no one will hear Mansell's voice, they intend for him to die until his corpse's odor alerts someone.

Raylan, Wendell (Victor Williams) and Bryl (Norbert Leo Butz) take Maureen (Marin Ireland) to the station, questioning her for the book. She angrily dismisses their accusations, stating that there is no evidence of anything against her. Raylan also becomes dismissive of their next plan against Mansell, raising suspicion for Wendell and Bryl. In Lansing, Carolyn applies for a Judge position, where she suggests Diane is a corrupt person. That night, Raylan is unable to sleep and goes back to Skender's bunker, where he is shocked by something.

Two hours earlier, Skender (Alexander Pobutsky) decides to seek revenge on Mansell himself, despite being assured by Costia that the matter is solved. After being supplied with a gun, he goes to the bunker to kill him. However, Mansell catches him and brutally beats him to death. He takes Skender's gun and flees. Upon discovering Skender's body, Raylan alerts the authorities about Mansell. Mansell goes to the Albanians' offices, killing everyone, including Costia. Mansell breaks into Carolyn's house, only to find Raylan awaiting him. As Mansell prepares to pull out a music cassette tape, Raylan shoots him when it appears he was pulling a gun. Carolyn arrives and calls authorities, while Mansell dies from his wounds.

Six weeks later, Raylan is back in Miami. He and his partner, Deputy Greg Sutter (David Koechner) attend a retirement party for their boss, Chief Deputy U.S. Marshal Dan Grant (Matt Craven). After the party, Grant offers to vouch Raylan for a higher position, but Raylan surprises him by announcing he is quitting. At home, he receives a package from Carolyn, who is revealed to have taken over Judge Guy's position, who suggests meeting again eventually. Raylan is then visited by Willa (Vivian Olyphant) and Winona (Natalie Zea), announcing his retirement. This surprises Winona, but she is delighted that he did it for Willa.

At Tramble Penitentiary, Kentucky, Boyd Crowder (Walton Goggins) is a preacher for the inmates. He announces that he will be transferred to a hospital due to a case of malaise. Boyd is escorted by Officer Ramirez (Luis Guzmán) and Officer Charlene Gerret (Ahna O'Reilly). After passing the bridge, the officers stop the vehicle when Boyd complains about something. When Ramirez opens the door, Charlene holds him at gunpoint, revealing she is with Boyd. Ramirez is locked inside the vehicle, while Boyd and Charlene escape. After changing clothes, they escape in a getaway car, planning to flee to Mexico. Back in Miami, Raylan relaxes in a boat with Willa, ignoring a message about an inmate escape in Kentucky. As Willa asks him about why he quit, his phone rings.

== Production ==
=== Development ===
In August 2023, FX announced that the eighth and final episode of the series would be titled "The Question", and was to be written by series developers Dave Andron and Michael Dinner, and directed by Dinner. This was Andron's fourth writing credit, Dinner's fourth writing credit, and Dinner's third directing credit.

=== Writing ===
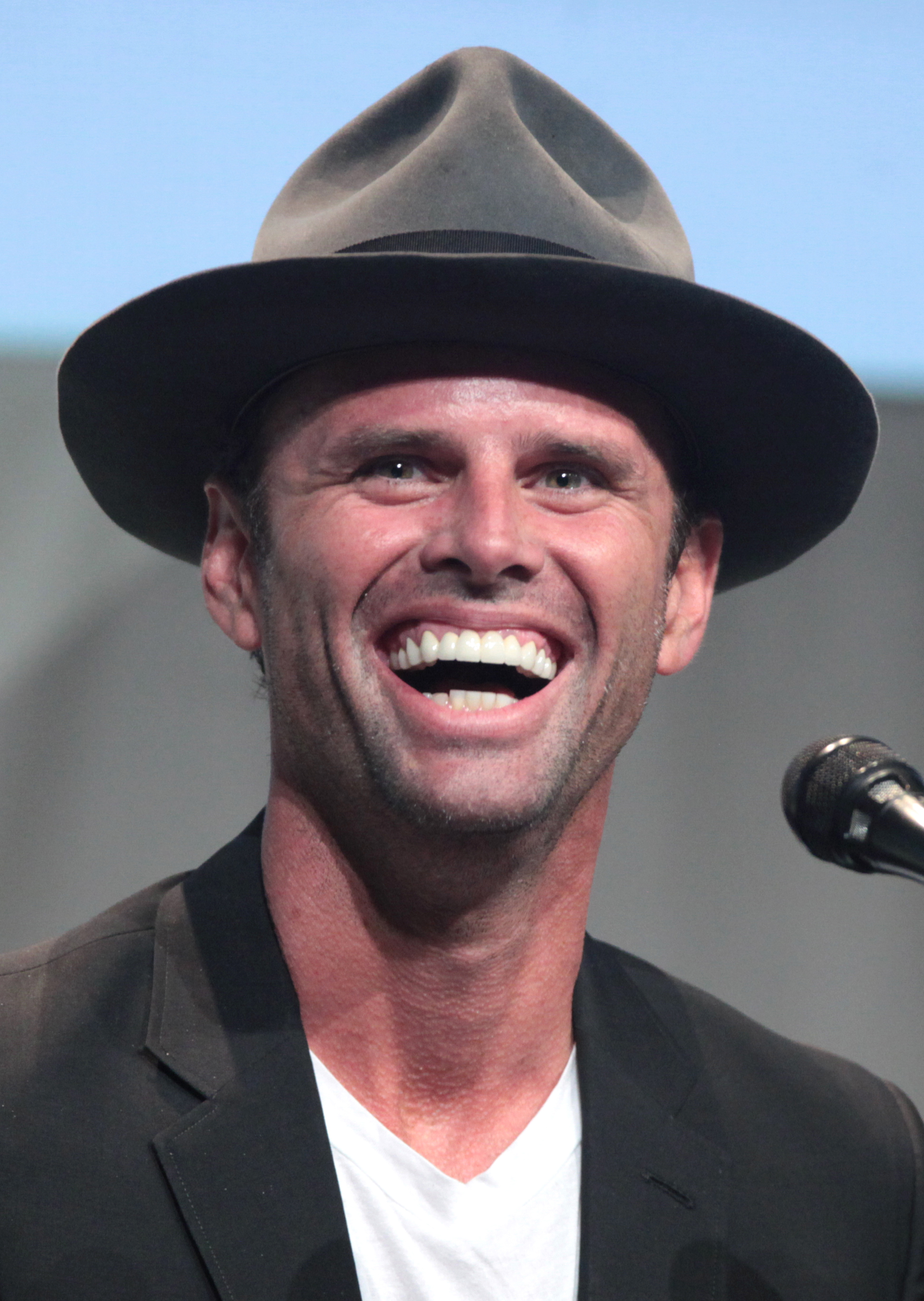
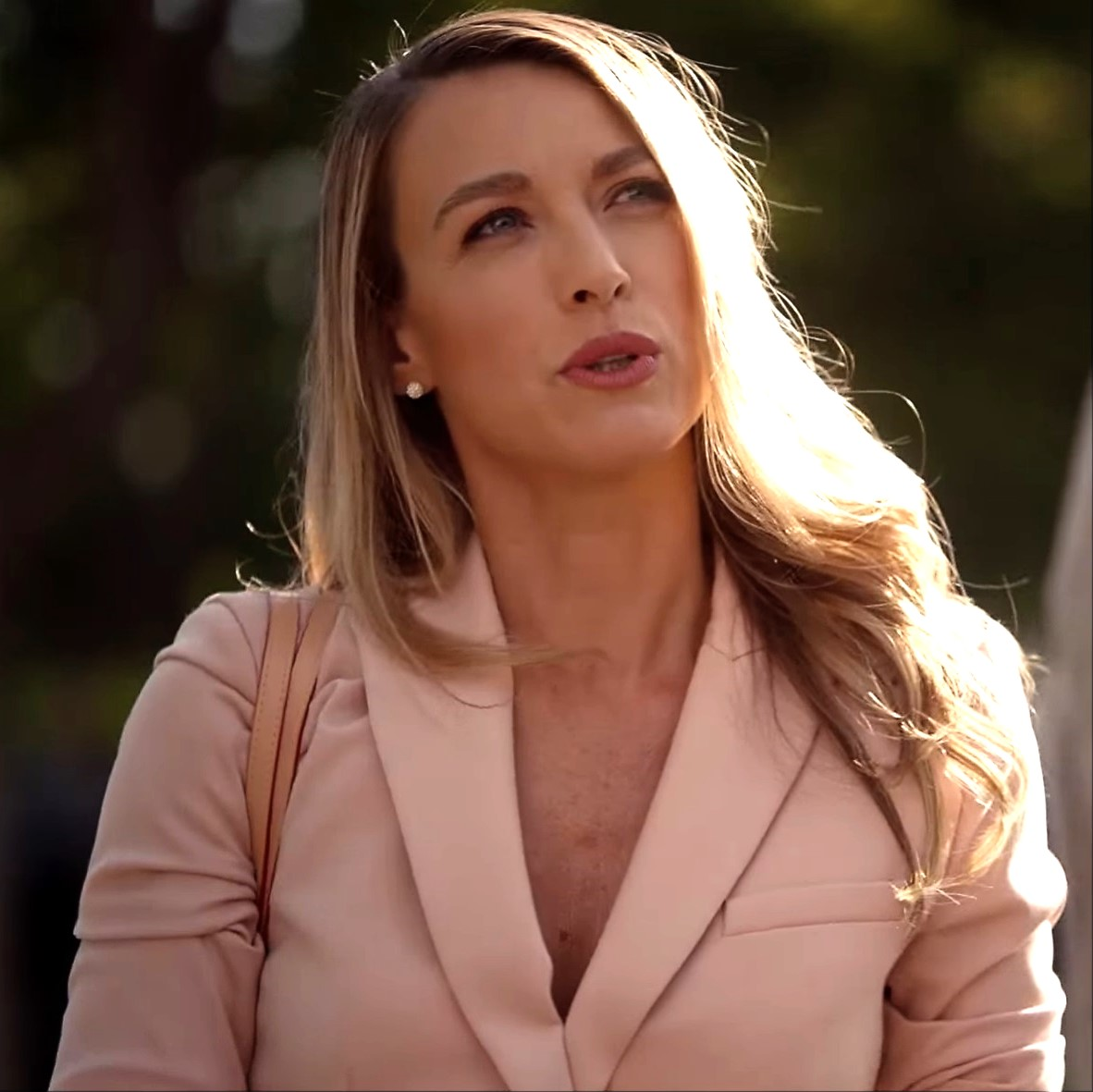
Walton Goggins and Natalie Zea reprise their roles from the original series.

Timothy Olyphant previewed the ending, saying "It was so strange and wild to see that ending. I honestly told them, because it kept bugging me for days, I kept thinking, wow! You can't do that ending if you don't deliver everything prior, you know? That ending doesn't work. So I was like, guys, it's a bold idea! As far as I'm concerned, they pulled it off. And everything that precedes the ending holds up."

Commenting on Mansell's death, Dinner said, "So on the one hand, this is a guy who wreaked havoc in the world and you could make an argument that it was justified and he got what he deserved. But on the other hand, he didn't. So it's complicated. It's like a lot of Elmore Leonard's material — it's not black-and-white, it's in the gray zone. I think Raylan realized that, and he realizes what his position is in the world of this place, so he's done. Or at least that's what we think."

On Winona's relationship with Raylan, Dinner explained, "That’s their tragedy in a sense; sometimes you meet people in your life and it's the wrong time or the wrong circumstances. The look in her eyes, I think it is complicated. She's saying to him, 'Why didn't you do this 20 years ago, or 15 years ago? Our story would have been different.' But you can't turn back the clock. I love that scene. I love where he is at this place, where she is, and the fact that they were two ships who passed in the night and it just didn't work."

Olyphant supported the idea of bringing Boyd back, but he told Dinner and Andron, "if you bring Walt back at the very end of this story, you better fucking deliver on the first seven." The writers didn't intend for Boyd to appear as a guide to Raylan just to understand Mansell, so they settled in having him appear at the end of the story. Dinner said, "There's a lot of road beneath their feet. But just seeing [Walton] do this again, and seeing the character after spending time in prison, it was a ball." He added, "mainly, we did it not because we wanted to say "Oh, we have to have another year of Justified." We did it because we wanted to have a good time, and we wanted to see Boyd again." Due to Goggins' commitment to other projects, the crew only had 36 hours to film his scenes.

== Reception ==
=== Viewers ===
In its original American broadcast, "The Question" was seen by an estimated 0.670 million household viewers and gained a 0.08 ratings share among adults aged 18–49, according to Nielsen Media Research. This means that 0.08 percent of all households with televisions watched the episode. This was a 13% increase in viewership from the previous episode, which was watched by 0.590 million viewers with a 0.06 in the 18-49 demographics.

=== Critical reviews ===
"The Question" received generally positive reviews from critics. Ben Travers of IndieWire gave the episode a "B" grade and wrote, "Seeing Raylan on his boat and Boyd literally riding off into the sunset feels more like an epilogue for each party than the next chapter. But if another season (or two, or three) come down the pipe, all the assurance we'll have of wrapping on another all-time ending stems from the consistent strength of each season thus far — including City Primeval."

Alan Sepinwall wrote, "when I realized that the epilogue was taking us into the federal penitentiary where we last saw Boyd Crowder, I whooped with delight. Perhaps it was the palate cleanser of getting a whole Boyd-less story. Or perhaps it was simply that so much time had passed that all I could feel was joy at getting to see Goggins in the role, and at realizing that the show was setting up a potential future season where Raylan gets to chase his fugitive frenemy." Roxana Hadadi of Vulture gave the episode a 4 star rating out of 5 and wrote, "Especially in this episode's final act, City Primeval skimps a bit in clarifying if Raylan is repelled/ashamed of his own actions and what they say about his old nature peeking through or disgusted by/disinterested in facing other criminals as reckless and as ruthless as Clement. Of course, it could be both, and maybe City Primeval doesn't come down hard one way or another because it wants to nod at Raylan's previous experiences and how they could have affected him now."

Caemeron Crain of TV Obsessive wrote, "You can easily see how a new series would go, with Raylan getting sucked back into the game to chase after Boyd. I would definitely watch that. But at the same time, if this is the end, I think it works. We can imagine the rest." Jesse Raub of Polygon wrote, "Instead of a prime moment, whatever shootouts come at the end of City Primeval feel anticlimactic. Justified had Raylan quick-drawing on his No. 1 target within the first 10 minutes of the series, and it let us know he was a man on a mission with a million dollar smirk and an itchy trigger finger who gets things done. City Primeval feels like — and starts with — a detour on the way to a different and more classic Raylan Givens story. And maybe, if we're lucky, we'll get one." Diana Keng of TV Fanatic gave the episode a 2.5 star rating out of 5 and wrote, "Devoting time and energy to watching a novel serial that spends a lot of time wandering through moral quandaries with characters missing crucial brain cells and riding the craziest luck streaks only to have it all flushed in favor of a 'Best Of Harlan' reunion feels like the most disrespectful bait-and-switch nonsense."
