= You Good? =

- Justified: City Primeval episode
- Episode no.: Episode 5
- Directed by: Kevin Rodney Sullivan
- Written by: Eisa Davis; Chris Provenzano
- Cinematography by: Jeffrey Greeley
- Editing by: Marta Evry
- Original release date: August 8, 2023
- Running time: 49 minutes

Guest appearances
- David Cross as Burt Dickey (special guest star); Paul Calderón as Raymond Cruz (special guest star); Amin Joseph as Jamal; Kenn E. Head as Lou Whitman; Regina Taylor as Diane; Joseph Anthony Byrd as Trennell; Ronald L. Conner as Chief Briggs; Penelope Walker as Mary Alice

Episode chronology
← Previous "Kokomo"	Next → "Adios"

"You Good?" is the fifth episode of the American television miniseries Justified: City Primeval, a continuation of the series Justified. The episode was written by producer Eisa Davis and executive producer Chris Provenzano, and directed by Kevin Rodney Sullivan. It originally aired on FX on August 8, 2023.

The series is set 15 years after the original series finale, and follows Raylan Givens, who now resides in Miami. He continues working as a U.S. Marshal while helping raise his daughter, Willa. However, he soon finds himself in Detroit when a criminal, Clement Mansell, starts wreaking havoc. In the episode, Carolyn faces pressure when Jamal resurfaces, while the police struggle in finding progress in the Judge's death.

According to Nielsen Media Research, the episode was seen by an estimated 0.573 million household viewers and gained a 0.06 ratings share among adults aged 18–49. The episode received mostly positive reviews, who praised the performances and character development, although some criticized the pacing.

== Plot ==
Raylan (Timothy Olyphant) wakes up, discovering that he slept with Carolyn (Aunjanue Ellis) last night. Carolyn states that they will not mention the event, saying their status quo has not changed at all. As he walks out, he meets Jamal (Amin Joseph), who takes a dislike to Raylan.

Mansell (Boyd Holbrook) meets with Sweety (Vondie Curtis-Hall) to discuss any potential targets in the Judge's book. Sweety suggests Burt Dickey (David Cross), a real estate agent in Bloomfield Hills, which Mansell accepts. They visit Dickey and blackmail him into giving up money to have his name removed from the book. Sweety asks for $30,000 but settles for $10,000, infuriating Mansell. That night, Mansell breaks into Dickey's house to retrieve an expensive painting. As the Judge's case has barely made any progress, Downey (Marin Ireland) states that they need to go back to the beginning. Raylan and Wendell (Victor Williams) check on the crime scene but won't find anything through the witnesses and they are unable to reach Detective Raymond Cruz to know more about Mansell.

Raylan and Carolyn dine in a restaurant, until their date is interrupted by Jamal, prompting Carolyn to walk out. She later visits Jamal at his house and they appear to reconcile. However, Carolyn discovers that Jamal is dating a woman, which means she no longer has to provide alimony to him. She states that she paid the tax lien and does not want to get involved with him ever again. She then visits Sweety at the Tavern, asking to see the book, willing to cooperate with him to get the position of Judge. Sweety allows her, but tells her not to do anything before informing him. At the bar, Raylan meets with Cruz (Paul Calderón), who claims there is not much information beyond what was found in the file. Cruz talks about an old case where he went after a criminal, and then the criminal visited him at home to make amends. However, when the criminal was reaching for something, Cruz killed him. The criminal was actually reaching for a bottle opener, but the incident was deemed as self-defense, and Cruz does not regret it as the criminal is now dead.

== Production ==
=== Development ===
In July 2023, FX announced that the fifth episode of the series would be titled "You Good?", and was to be written by producer Eisa Davis and executive producer Chris Provenzano, and directed by Kevin Rodney Sullivan. This was Davis' second writing credit, Provenzano's second writing credit, and Sullivan's first directing credit.

== Reception ==
=== Viewers ===
In its original American broadcast, "You Good?" was seen by an estimated 0.573 million household viewers and gained a 0.06 ratings share among adults aged 18–49, according to Nielsen Media Research. This means that 0.06 percent of all households with televisions watched the episode. This was a slight decrease in viewership from the previous episode, which was watched by 0.603 million viewers with a 0.10 in the 18-49 demographics.

=== Critical reviews ===
"You Good?" received mostly positive reviews from critics. Ben Travers of IndieWire gave the episode a "B+" grade and wrote, "If he wants to have any kind of future, Raylan better make damn sure he doesn't end up regretting the past. Some conversations you can only resolve with yourself."

Roxana Hadadi of Vulture gave the episode a 4 star rating out of 5 and wrote, "We're midway through this limited series, and who trusts whom remains all twisted up in 'You Good?' — this is an episode of moves and countermoves, secrets and revelations, and they're mostly handled quite gracefully in dialogue-driven scenes that center various pairs."

Caemeron Crain of TV Obsessive wrote, "Last week, Raylan wasn't OK with the idea of the Albanians doing this dirty work for him, so it would be quite a swing if he came around to being willing to murder Clement himself. I doubt that will be the case. Instead, he'll have to create a situation where it doesn't feel like he has a choice. Then he'll kill him and we’ll be left to parse whether there's an ethical difference. I'm speculating, to be clear." Diana Keng of TV Fanatic gave the episode a 3.5 star rating out of 5 and wrote, "It's hard to get too excited about 'You Good?' when it feels like a lot of wheel spinning. Sure, Raylan and Carolyn get complicated, and Clement and Sweetie start their extortion endeavor together, but the governor's not the only one wondering why the judge's murder investigation isn't progressing. I appreciate that Carolyn's not impressed by Raylan and Jamal's cockfight posturing. Still, if the purpose of piling the pain on her is to push her to use the judge's notebook to secure her judge appointment, I'm not feeling it."
