= Backstabbers (Justified: City Primeval) =

- Justified: City Primeval episode
- Episode no.: Episode 3
- Directed by: Jon Avnet
- Written by: Eisa Davis; Chris Provenzano
- Cinematography by: David Stockton
- Editing by: Marta Evry
- Original release date: July 25, 2023
- Running time: 44 minutes

Guest appearances
- Ravi V. Patel as Rick Newley; Joseph Anthony Byrd as Trennell; Dominic Fumusa as Bill Downey; Kenn E. Head as Lou Whitman; Vivian Olyphant as Willa Givens; Alexander Pobutsky as Skender Lulgjuraj

Episode chronology
← Previous "The Oklahoma Wildman"	Next → "Kokomo"

"Backstabbers" is the third episode of the American television miniseries Justified: City Primeval, a continuation of the series Justified. The episode was written by producer Eisa Davis and executive producer Chris Provenzano, and directed by Jon Avnet. It originally aired on FX on July 25, 2023.

The series is set 15 years after the original series finale, and follows Raylan Givens, who now resides in Miami. He continues working as a U.S. Marshal while helping raise his daughter, Willa. However, he soon finds himself in Detroit when a criminal, Clement Mansell, starts wreaking havoc. In the episode, Mansell and Sandy plan their move on Skender, while Raylan feels more pressure regarding Willa's place in his assignment.

According to Nielsen Media Research, the episode was seen by an estimated 0.560 million household viewers and gained a 0.07 ratings share among adults aged 18–49. The episode received mostly positive reviews, who praised the writing, performances, pacing and build up for the following episodes.

== Plot ==
In Grosse Pointe, Carolyn (Aunjanue Ellis) calls Jamal over a tax lien that just arrived. Suddenly, she is visited by Mansell (Boyd Holbrook), who reveals that Raylan (Timothy Olyphant) assaulted him. Finding that he was talking to Willa (Vivian Olyphant), Carolyn warns him to stay away from her and her house.

Wendell (Victor Williams) arrests Sandy (Adelaide Clemens) at the casino, while authorities conduct a raid at the bar and arrest Mansell at the penthouse. During their interrogation, authorities try to get a confession, but neither Mansell, Sandy nor Sweety (Vondie Curtis-Hall) give in. Due to Carolyn's pressure, they are forced to release them due to lack of evidence, as the gun was not found in Sweety's Tavern. The gun is revealed to be in Sweety's possession, who hides it in a jukebox at the tavern. Raylan questions Skender (Alexander Pobutsky), deeming him a prime suspect. However, Skender reveals that he plans to marry Sandy but will meet "her brother" for his blessing. This makes Raylan realize that Skender is actually the target. Raylan tries to send Willa back home, but she refuses, demanding to stay and spend more time with him.

Sweety visits Carolyn. He claims he could have the murder weapon in exchange for a special deal. Carolyn cannot promise special immunity, advising him to turn it in. Sweety says he will wait until she can get a deal for him. Skender meets Sandy and "her brother" Mansell at a bar, where they make him drink too much alcohol. Skender proposes to Sandy and asks Mansell for his blessing. Mansell says he will grant it if he can show them a section in his house where he keeps money. They leave, while Wendell and Bryl (Norbert Leo Butz) follow them on a black SUV. Aware that he is being followed, Mansell stops at a green light, forcing the other cars to move aside and exposing Bryl. When it turns to red light, Mansell drives off. Bryl and Wendell follow, but they are hit by an incoming car.

Skender takes Mansell and Sandy to his house. He then shows them a section where he has a man cave. There is a vault, but it only contains guns, disappointing Mansell and prompting him to pull out a gun. While accompanying Willa to the airport, Raylan is called by Maureen (Marin Ireland) to inform him about the events at Skender's house.

== Production ==
=== Development ===
In June 2023, FX announced that the third episode of the series would be titled "Backstabbers", and was to be written by producer Eisa Davis and executive producer Chris Provenzano, and directed by Jon Avnet. This was Davis' first writing credit, Provenzano's first writing credit, and Davis' first directing credit.

== Reception ==
=== Viewers ===
In its original American broadcast, "Backstabbers" was seen by an estimated 0.560 million household viewers and gained a 0.07 ratings share among adults aged 18–49, according to Nielsen Media Research. This means that 0.07 percent of all households with televisions watched the episode. This was a 34% decrease in viewership from the previous episode, which was watched by 0.848 million viewers with a 0.13 in the 18-49 demographics.

=== Critical reviews ===
"Backstabbers" received mostly positive reviews from critics. Ben Travers of IndieWire gave the episode a "B" grade and wrote, "Justified: City Primeval is playing a tricky game. In these first three episodes, Willa is forcing her dad to choose between his job and his daughter, which in turn asks the audience to root for Raylan to quit chasing bad guys... which is the engine that drives the show. Even considering as much is enough to unsettle viewers who've been anticipating more Justified since the initial incarnation ended; typically, people don't want their favorite stories to return, only to explain that coming back was a mistake. City Primeval isn’t going that far but I admire the courage to ask such questions, and look forward to seeing how Raylan defends his choices."

Roxana Hadadi of Vulture gave the episode a 4 star rating out of 5 and wrote, "City Primeval is getting more interwoven: Sweety has the gun Clement used to kill both the judge and the five people involved in the Wrecking Crew killings in 2017 and is thinking about leveraging it for a deal; the DPD is still desperate to reclaim Guy's little black book, which looks mostly like a list of bribes; the 'hard-ass' Albanians are presumably about to be on Clement and Sandy's case. But it's the seeming end of the road for Willa, who returns to Florida at the elder Givens's insistence, and, honestly, I didn't expect her exit."

Caemeron Crain of TV Obsessive wrote, "Sweety has the gun that Sandy hid in his ceiling, and he's told Carolyn he has it. She's going to try to arrange immunity for him, so there's also a threat to Clement on that flank. One has to guess that it's not going to work out as they hope, since Justified: City Primeval has five episodes to go and it seems pretty clear that Clement is its overarching villain." Diana Keng of TV Fanatic gave the episode a 3.5 star rating out of 5 and wrote, "With so many players making moves, the momentum is building toward potentially tragic and assuredly intense collisions."

=== Accolades ===
TVLine named Timothy Olyphant as the "Performer of the Week" for the week of July 29, 2023, for his performance in the episode. The site wrote, "So much about Raylan Givens over the years has been about the actions he takes — dogging varmints, warning that the 'next one's comin' faster,' and of course being quick with the draw. But the third episode of FX's limited sequel series was so much about Raylan reacting to things, including daughter Willa's questions about her place in his life, and Olyphant had us just as rapt as if he was staring down a hooligan, his finger hovering beside a trigger."
