= The Smoking Gun (Justified: City Primeval) =

- Justified: City Primeval episode
- Episode no.: Episode 7
- Directed by: Katrelle Kindred
- Teleplay by: Dave Andron; Michael Dinner
- Cinematography by: Jeffrey Greeley
- Editing by: Marta Evry
- Original air date: August 22, 2023
- Running time: 42 minutes

Guest appearances
- Terry Kinney as Toma Costia (special guest star); Yosef Kasnetzkov as Besnik Darke; Alexander Pobutsky as Skender Lulgjuraj; Joseph Anthony Byrd as Trennell; Andy Carey as Del Weems; Corey Hendrix as Darrol Woods

Episode chronology
← Previous "Adios"	Next → "The Question"

"The Smoking Gun" is the seventh episode of the American television miniseries Justified: City Primeval, a continuation of the series Justified. The episode was written by series developers Dave Andron and Michael Dinner, and directed by Katrelle Kindred. It originally aired on FX on August 22, 2023.

The series is set 15 years after the original series finale, and follows Raylan Givens, who now resides in Miami. He continues working as a U.S. Marshal while helping raise his daughter, Willa. However, he soon finds himself in Detroit when a criminal, Clement Mansell, starts wreaking havoc. In the episode, Raylan and Carolyn plan their next move against Mansell, while Sandy questions her relationship with him.

According to Nielsen Media Research, the episode was seen by an estimated 0.590 million household viewers and gained a 0.06 ratings share among adults aged 18–49. The episode received positive reviews from critics, who praised the performances and set-up for the finale, although some still felt unconvinced about the season's narrative choices.

== Plot ==
In 1988, Sweety (Vondie Curtis-Hall) plays with his band at a nightclub. Sweety is also revealed to be taking care of a young Carolyn, after promising her dying father to do so. He takes her to a dilapidated bar, planning to reconstruct it and turn into a new tavern for him.

In present day, Carolyn (Aunjanue Ellis) sees an ambulance take Sweety's body away from the destroyed tavern. She and Raylan (Timothy Olyphant) visit a grieving Trennell (Joseph Anthony Byrd), who confesses to having taken Sweety's gun out of the jukebox. Raylan then visits Sandy (Adelaide Clemens), who refuses to testify against Mansell (Boyd Holbrook). However, she is shocked when Raylan informs her that they found the gun that Mansell used to kill the Judge, Rose, and Sweety, with Sandy unaware of the latter's death. Sandy decides to visit Skender (Alexander Pobutsky) at the hospital to reconcile, but panics once he calls her "a dead woman."

Carolyn arrives home to find Mansell waiting for her. He starts talking about his childhood in Oklahoma, partly on how his mother had sex with many men from the Glenn Pool Oil Reserve. Angry, he waited until a man left and killed his mother. He also points out that his story may be false, suggesting his mother actually died in a tornado. She threatens to back off as his lawyer, but he holds her at gunpoint. The following day, Raylan finds that Downey (Marin Ireland) is actually in Mansell's book, which explains why she allowed him to go. Bryl (Norbert Leo Butz) also admits to Raylan that he has framed criminals due to insufficient evidence, but he also provides him with Mansell's murder weapon.

Under pressure, Sandy steals Mansell's money and flees to the airport, intending to leave for Nassau, Bahamas. However, she is called by Mansell, who has taken the arriving Del Weems (Andy Carey) hostage. He tells her to come back with the money, or he will kill him and chase her. She calls back to state that she will meet him at a bar to secure Del's release. Unaware to Mansell, Sandy gave him away to Raylan, intending to live an honest life. Despite promising Sandy to release him, Mansell kills Del. Raylan informs Carolyn about the meeting, but Carolyn is revealed to have informed the Albanians about the meeting. At a hotel bar, Raylan and Mansell meet, with Mansell noting that Raylan brought the weapon so he can put his fingerprints on it. As Raylan taunts him, the meeting is interrupted by the Albanians, who force them to accompany them. The Albanians make a stop at a bridge, where they drop the murder weapon into the water below.

== Production ==
=== Development ===
In July 2023, FX announced that the seventh episode of the series would be titled "The Smoking Gun", and was to be written by series developers Dave Andron and Michael Dinner, and directed by Katrelle Kindred. This was Andron's third writing credit, Dinner's third writing credit, and Kindred's first directing credit.

== Reception ==
=== Viewers ===
In its original American broadcast, "The Smoking Gun" was seen by an estimated 0.590 million household viewers and gained a 0.06 ratings share among adults aged 18–49, according to Nielsen Media Research. This means that 0.06 percent of all households with televisions watched the episode. This was a 12% decrease in viewership from the previous episode, which was watched by 0.665 million viewers with a 0.11 in the 18-49 demographics.

=== Critical reviews ===
"The Smoking Gun" received positive reviews from critics. Ben Travers of IndieWire gave the episode a "B+" grade and wrote, "All season long, Raylan's way of doing things has been challenged. His faith in the system, his trust in his peers, his very understanding of bad men and what they deserve — he's reconsidered everything, and the finale will undoubtedly force him to decide what ending lets him sleep at night. If, that is, the decision is still his to make."

Roxana Hadadi of Vulture gave the episode a 3 star rating out of 5 and wrote, "There are still many logic gaps in 'The Smoking Gun,' as in preceding episode 'Adios,' and overall, Justified: City Primeval has been really inconsistent in terms of what its characters prioritize, what they're trying to protect, and what they want to achieve. [...] Still, 'The Smoking Gun' is a better episode than 'Adios.' It's a more tightly paced and comprehensively plotted installment that brings the Albanians back into the mix and faces Raylan and Clement off against each other in what is surely a dress rehearsal for a bigger showdown to come in next week's finale."

Caemeron Crain of TV Obsessive wrote, "It's the finale of City Primeval next week, and with both our protagonist and antagonist in the clutches of the Albanian mob as Episode 7 ends, it's hard to predict what will happen. I expect Clement to die, but I have no idea how many other people might also die or what the fallout might be for Raylan, Carolyn, and others." Diana Keng of TV Fanatic gave the episode a 4 star rating out of 5 and wrote, "With only a single hour left to wrap this up, I feel the series has tried something new under the giant shadow of the O.G. series with mixed results. The case is baffling, and the players aren't pulling in the same direction. With everyone going their own way, sustaining any momentum in the narrative or developing connections to the ensemble is hard. And as a marshall, Raylan's been left without direction until now."

=== Accolades ===
TVLine named Aunjanue Ellis as an honorable mention as the "Performer of the Week" for the week of August 26, 2023, for her performance in the episode. The site wrote, "So much about Aunjanue Ellis' engaging performance in Justified: City Primeval's penultimate episode came from her body language. Rocking on her heels outside the bar that belonged to her father figure and which had just been torched — with Sweety inside. The way she could only stare at its charred entrance, before remarking that Sweety, in the end, 'was a chump' — an assessment that pained her to offer, true though it may be. Later, she had no words upon finding Mansell in her home, recounting his murder of his mom. Until, that is, she found words: 'You took the only father I've ever known. F–k your mother, and f–k you.' Capping Ellis' performance was a quiet scene where Carolyn told Raylan about a childhood choking akin to the one Mansell just gave her, before she got to the brass tacks of it all. 'You have the murder weapon,' she noted. 'How are you going to get Mansell's prints on it?'"
