= Kokomo (Justified: City Primeval) =

- Justified: City Primeval episode
- Episode no.: Episode 4
- Directed by: Gwyneth Horder-Payton
- Written by: Taylor Elmore
- Cinematography by: Amy Vincent
- Editing by: Hunter M. Via
- Original release date: August 1, 2023
- Running time: 44 minutes

Guest appearances
- Terry Kinney as Toma Kastiot; Ravi V. Patel as Rick Newley; Jessika Van as Hina; Jalen Gilbert as Tyrone Power; Yosef Kasnetzkov as Besnik Darke; Alexander Pobutsky as Skender Lulgjuraj

Episode chronology
← Previous "Backstabbers"	Next → "You Good?"

"Kokomo" is the fourth episode of the American television miniseries Justified: City Primeval, a continuation of the series Justified. The episode was written by executive producer Taylor Elmore, and directed by Gwyneth Horder-Payton. It originally aired on FX on August 1, 2023.

The series is set 15 years after the original series finale, and follows Raylan Givens, who now resides in Miami. He continues working as a U.S. Marshal while helping raise his daughter, Willa. However, he soon finds himself in Detroit when a criminal, Clement Mansell, starts wreaking havoc. In the episode, Mansell offers Sweety a partnership, while the Albanians target those responsible for Skender's condition.

According to Nielsen Media Research, the episode was seen by an estimated 0.603 million household viewers and gained a 0.10 ratings share among adults aged 18–49. The episode received mostly positive reviews, who praised the writing, performances and pacing.

== Plot ==
At the secret room, an upset Mansell (Boyd Holbrook) brutally beats Skender (Alexander Pobutsky). Convinced by Sandy (Adelaide Clemens), he spares Skender, but forces him to let the door crush his leg before fleeing.

Raylan (Timothy Olyphant) arrives at the hospital as the officers inform him about Skender's status. Realizing that Skender's boss is his uncle Toma Kastiot (Terry Kinney), Raylan convinces Skender's entourage into setting a meeting. He and Bryl (Norbert Leo Butz) visit Kastiot at his office, who is not proud of Skender's actions. Despite being suggested that Mansell was involved, Kastiot refuses to provide any information and decides to take matters into his own hands. Meanwhile, Albanian criminals are trying to locate Sandy and force her boss, Rick Newley (Ravi V. Patel) into revealing her address.

Using the Judge's notebook, Mansell meets with Sweety (Vondie Curtis-Hall) at his tavern. Sweety is not delighted over Mansell having Sandy drop the weapon at his establishment, but becomes interested when Mansell mentions the notebook contains information to blackmail people. Carolyn (Aunjanue Ellis) meets with Sweety, stating that he will get immunity if he brings over the murder weapon and testifying about the Judge's death and the dealers' demise. With the new information that Mansell provided, Sweety declines the deal. The Albanian enforcers arrive at Sandy's apartment, taking her roommate Hina (Jessika Van) hostage. They force her to call Sandy into coming home, but Sandy is dining with Mansell, and the latter forbids her from leaving until later. As they await, the enforcers decide to torture Hina by removing her teeth.

As night falls, Raylan and Bryl decide to check Sandy's apartment. Seeing Hina being tortured, they break in the apartment to confront the enforcers. One of them runs off, forcing Bryl to kill him while the other is arrested. As they stay outside, Mansell and Sandy drive by and avoid the apartment. Sweety meets with Mansell at the penthouse to discuss a partnership. As Carolyn leaves her office, she finds she is being followed by Albanians. She calls Raylan, who intimidates the Albanians into leaving her alone. Raylan then stays vigilant outside Carolyn's house, so Carolyn decides to join him in his car to drink.

== Production ==
=== Development ===
The episode was originally titled "Fun Wit' Albanians". In July 2023, FX announced that the fourth episode of the series would be titled "Kokomo", and was to be written by executive producer Taylor Elmore, and directed by Gwyneth Horder-Payton. This was Elmore's first writing credit, and Horder-Payton's first directing credit.

According to Timothy Olyphant on the Happy Sad Confused Podcast, Quentin Tarantino was going to direct this episode, but the birth of his child prevented him from doing so.

== Reception ==
=== Viewers ===
In its original American broadcast, "Kokomo" was seen by an estimated 0.603 million household viewers and gained a 0.10 ratings share among adults aged 18–49, according to Nielsen Media Research. This means that 0.10 percent of all households with televisions watched the episode. This was a slight increase in viewership from the previous episode, which was watched by 0.560 million viewers with a 0.07 in the 18-49 demographics.

=== Critical reviews ===
"Kokomo" received mostly positive reviews from critics. Ben Travers of IndieWire gave the episode a "B+" grade and wrote, "Maybe Carolyn will lure Raylan into Detroit's sense of justice, or maybe he'll pull her back from using the little black book toward her own ends. Either way, in a challenging city, they're better off together than apart."

Roxana Hadadi of Vulture gave the episode a 4 star rating out of 5 and wrote, "What makes this episode more enjoyable than 'Backstabbers,' though, is how the removal of Willa gives Raylan the laser focus he needs to really make moves in this case and allows the character to show different facets of himself. We've seen the older and wiser version of Raylan already, the one who (mostly) puts methodical investigation over reckless spontaneity. But I missed flirty, smart-ass, abrupt Raylan, too, and 'Kokomo' gives us that guy during his visits to Carolyn's office and home, the meeting with Toma, and the raid on Tina’s apartment."

Caemeron Crain of TV Obsessive wrote, "halfway through City Primeval things have just continued to get messier and messier. If Clement and Sweety are about to start blackmailing muckety-mucks in Detroit for their various indiscretions, we can expect there's even more chaos to come. Thankfully Willa is now safe at home in Miami." Diana Keng of TV Fanatic gave the episode a 4 star rating out of 5 and wrote, "It took them until 'Kokomo', but we finally got what is - in my estimation - a classic Elmore Leonard-esque criminal philosophy expounded with conviction and eloquence."

=== Accolades ===
TVLine named Vondie Curtis-Hall as an honorable mention as the "Performer of the Week" for the week of August 5, 2023, for his performance in the episode. The site wrote, "Justified: City Primeval's Sweety was given a lot to chew on this week, and Vondie Curtis-Hall in turn enjoyed his best scenes yet. Heading into Episode 4, Sweety had a plan to parlay the murder weapon he had found stashed in his bar into A) overdue punishment for Mansell's myriad crimes and B) immunity for himself. But when Mansell clued his cohort-of-sorts into Judge Guy's little black book, Sweety's wheels got turning. Curtis-Hall conveyed a cool, newfound pragmatism as Sweety suggested to Carolyn that this book's secrets about Detroit power players represents 'the keys to the city' — one of which might get her the judgeship she covets. Later, when Mansell aimed to cement a partnership, Sweety presented himself as well-wooed, remarking, 'This is a nice view' as he regarded the skyline from Mansell's digs. How does Sweety plan to get what's due him and take down Mansell? Curtis-Hall's nuanced, engaging performance has us curious/worried to find out!"
