= Free world (disambiguation) =

The Free World is a politically charged term that was used during the Cold War to refer to the Western Bloc.

Free World may also refer to:

- Free World (magazine), a 1940s American monthly magazine of politics and culture
- "Free World" (song), by Kirsty MacColl, 1989
- The Free World, a 2016 American film
