= City Primeval =

1980 crime novel by Elmore Leonard

- First edition
- Author: Elmore Leonard
- Language: English
- Publisher: Arbor House
- Publication date: 1980
- Publication place: United States
- Media type: Hard cover

City Primeval is a crime novel written by Elmore Leonard.

A limited television series adaptation of the novel, Justified: City Primeval, was released in 2023. The story was repurposed as a spinoff of the TV series Justified and features Raylan Givens (Timothy Olyphant) instead of the novel's protagonist, Raymond Cruz. However, Cruz is included as a minor character, portrayed by Paul Calderón who reprises his role from another adaptation of a novel written by Leonard, Out of Sight (1998).

== Plot summary ==
"Oklahoma Wildman" Clement Mansell, having already gotten away with murder once, kills a crooked Detroit judge. Homicide Detective Raymond Cruz pursues him. When Mansell tries to extort money from Skender Lulgjaraj, an Albanian criminal, Cruz maneuvers Mansell into a showdown.
