= Justified: City Primeval =

American Western television miniseries

- Genre: Neo-Western; Action; Crime; Drama
- Based on: City Primeval and "Fire in the Hole" by Elmore Leonard
- Developed by: Dave Andron; Michael Dinner
- Starring: Timothy Olyphant; Aunjanue Ellis; Vondie Curtis-Hall; Adelaide Clemens; Marin Ireland; Victor Williams; Norbert Leo Butz; Boyd Holbrook
- Composer: Mark Isham
- Country of origin: United States
- Original language: English
- No. of episodes: 8

Production
- Executive producers: Dave Andron; Michael Dinner; Sarah Timberman; Carl Beverly; Graham Yost; Peter Leonard; Timothy Olyphant; Taylor Elmore; Chris Provenzano; VJ Boyd
- Producers: Eisa Davis; Cami Patton
- Production location: Chicago
- Editor: Hunter M. Via
- Camera setup: Single-camera
- Running time: 41–52 minutes
- Production companies: Rooney McP Productions; Dave & Ron Productions; Timberman/Beverly Productions; Olybomb Productions; MGM Television; FXP; Sony Pictures Television Studios

Original release
- Network: FX
- Release: July 18 – August 29, 2023

Related
- Justified; Out of Sight

Justified: City Primeval is an American neo-Western crime drama television miniseries developed by showrunners Dave Andron and Michael Dinner. The series continues the story from Justified taking inspiration from the Elmore Leonard novel City Primeval: High Noon in Detroit and short story "Fire in the Hole". Timothy Olyphant returns to star as Deputy U.S. Marshal Raylan Givens, with Paul Calderón also reprising his role as Detective Raymond Cruz from the 1998 crime comedy film Out of Sight, a film adaptation of Leonard's 1996 novel of the same name. A world premiere was held on June 1, 2023, at the 12th ATX Television Festival, and the series premiered on FX on July 18, 2023, with back-to-back episodes. It received generally positive reviews from critics.

== Premise ==
Raylan Givens left Kentucky for Miami, where he continues working as a U.S. Marshal while helping to raise his daughter. He soon finds himself in Detroit, pursuing The Oklahoma Wildman, Clement Mansell, who has been eluding the Detroit police force.

== Cast ==
=== Main ===
- Timothy Olyphant as Raylan Givens, a Deputy U.S. Marshal
- Aunjanue Ellis as Carolyn Wilder, a defense attorney
- Vondie Curtis-Hall as Marcus "Sweety" Sweeton, owner of a neighborhood bar
- Adelaide Clemens as Sandy Stanton, Clement's partner
- Marin Ireland as Maureen Downey, a Detroit Police Department (DPD) detective
- Victor Williams as Wendell Robinson, a DPD detective
- Norbert Leo Butz as Norbert Bryl, a DPD detective
- Boyd Holbrook as Clement Mansell, a violent and ruthless criminal known as "The Oklahoma Wildman"

=== Recurring ===
- Ravi V. Patel as Rick Newley, Sandy's boss at the casino
- Kenn E. Head as Lou Whitman
- Vivian Olyphant as Willa Givens, Raylan's 15-year-old daughter
- Alexander Pobutsky as Skender Lulgjuraj
- Regina Taylor as Diane, a prosecutor
- Joseph Anthony Byrd as Trennell
- Eddie Martinez as Hector
- Terry Kinney as Toma Costia, the head of the Albanian mob in Detroit
- Yosef Kasnetzkov as Besnik Darke
- Nick Druzbanski as Luka

=== Special guests ===
- Keith David as Judge Alvin Guy
- Amin Joseph as Jamal, Carolyn's ex-husband
- Paul Calderón as Detective Raymond Cruz, reprising his role from Out of Sight
- David Cross as Burt Dickey
- Walton Goggins as Boyd Crowder, a criminal in a Kentucky penitentiary who Raylan helped put away; Goggins reprises his role from Justified
- Natalie Zea as Winona Hawkins, Raylan's ex-wife; reprises her role from Justified
- Luis Guzmán as Officer Ramirez

=== Guests ===
- Matt Craven as Chief Deputy U.S. Marshal Dan Grant; reprises his role from Justified
- David Koechner as Deputy Greg Sutter; reprises his role from Justified

== Episodes ==
No.	Title	Directed by	Written by	Original release date	U.S. viewers (millions)
1	"City Primeval"	Michael Dinner	Dave Andron & Michael Dinner	July 18, 2023	0.848
While Raylan takes a now fifteen-year-old Willa Givens to a camp after repeated disciplinary problems, a pair of criminals try to steal his car. He subdues them but misses the camp deadline, forcing him to take her along while he extradites the men to their hometown, Detroit. Raylan and Willa aggravate judge Alvin Guy during the arraignment, so he drops the Miami charges. Guy submits a request to the local chief of police that Raylan help investigate an attempt on his life, forcing him to stay in Detroit. The police catch one of the perpetrators, who reveals that the attack was motivated by Guy having sex with the other man's mother for legal favors. She sells him out to the police, and they rescue her when he takes her hostage. Dangerous criminal Clement "The Oklahoma Wildman" Mansell comes to town to rob wealthy Albanian Skender Lulgjuraj, who his girlfriend Sandy Stanton has seduced. He follows Skender's car, but gets distracted when Guy and his assistant unintentionally cut him off. He rams them and kills them both when Guy pulls a gun, taking a notebook he finds in his pocket.
2	"The Oklahoma Wildman"	Michael Dinner	Dave Andron & Michael Dinner	July 18, 2023	0.493
In 2017, bar owner Andrew "Sweety" Sweeton sets up his drug dealer friends to be robbed by Mansell, who kills them. Horrified, Sweety turns him in, and attorney Carolyn Wilder introduces herself to Mansell. In the present, Raylan and detective Wendell Robinson track Mansell's abandoned car to Sandy's penthouse, where Robinson recognizes her as the woman Mansell was with when he arrested him in 2017. Mansell orders her to throw the gun that killed Guy into the River Rouge, but she instead hides it in Sweety's bar. She warns Mansell that the police are looking into him, while Carolyn warns Raylan to stay away from Mansell. Sweety calls her after Raylan and Robinson visit him after observing Sandy leaving his bar. Mansell tracks down Raylan's hotel and has dinner with Willa, and she watches in horror as Raylan takes him outside and beats him.
3	"Backstabbers"	Jon Avnet	Eisa Davis & Chris Provenzano	July 25, 2023	0.560
Mansell complains to Carolyn that Raylan beat him, but she cuts him off when she learns he provoked him. The police arrest him, Sandy and Sweety, though none of them give up any information and the gun in the bar remains unfound. Sweety's worker Trennell finds the gun, so he takes it and relocates it inside a jukebox. He informs Carolyn that he has it, but refuses to hand it over until she can provide a deal for him. Raylan learns that Skender intends to marry Sandy and realizes she and Mansell are targeting him. Posing as Sandy's brother, Mansell gets Skender drunk and convinces him to show them his safe room. As they drive, Mansell realizes Robinson and detective Norbert Bryl are tailing them, so he tricks them into crashing their car. He attacks Skender after realizing he has no money on hand. Concerned for Willa's safety, Raylan sends her back to Florida against her wishes.
4	"Kokomo"	Gwyneth Horder-Payton	Taylor Elmore	August 1, 2023	0.603
Mansell crushes Skender's leg under the room's automatic door. His powerful uncle sends a pair of brother enforcers after Mansell, who force Sandy's employer to give them her address. Carolyn agrees to give Sweety protection if he gets her the gun, but he declines, having learned from Mansell that Guy's notebook is full of information on corrupt and powerful individuals. The brothers force Sandy's roommate to try to get her to come back, but Mansell persuades her not to go. Checking Sandy's apartment on a whim, Raylan and Bryl encounter the men torturing the roommate and Bryl kills one of them when he flees. Other Albanians follow Carolyn due to her connection with Mansell, so she calls Raylan and he wards them off. He stays outside her house to keep an eye on her, and she decides to bring him a drink.
5	"You Good?"	Kevin Rodney Sullivan	Eisa Davis & Chris Provenzano	August 8, 2023	0.573
Raylan and Carolyn have sex, and he is confronted by her ex-husband Jamal when he wakes up, trying to get her to pay his tax lien. Mansell and Sweety blackmail realtor Burt Dickey to get his name removed from the notebook, but Mansell is annoyed at how little they get and later steals an expensive painting from him. Jamal interrupts Raylan and Carolyn's date, so she visits him later to try to make peace but is furious to learn he is dating another woman, meaning she has been paying alimony to him without needing to. She goes to Sweety and demands to see the notebook. Looking for information on Mansell, Raylan tracks down the officer who arrested him in 2017. He is unable to give him much, but tells Raylan about a criminal he killed and staged the shooting as self-defense.
6	"Adios"	Sylvain White	Taylor Elmore & V.J. Boyd	August 15, 2023	0.665
Dickey hires his associate Lonnie to take the painting back from Mansell. Raylan and detective Maureen Downey press prosecutor Diane Rogers, listed in the notebook, into helping them catch Mansell and Sweety. She contacts them and offers a bribe to have her name removed, while Lonnie approaches Sweety, who gives him the location of the meeting to kill Mansell and offers to get the painting, unaware that Sandy already sold it. Mansell is arrested at the meeting before Lonnie can kill him, but is released after not having brought the notebook or any weapons. He goes to Sweety's, having taken his gun back, and kills him and Lonnie before burning the building.
7	"The Smoking Gun"	Katrelle Kindred	Dave Andron & Michael Dinner	August 22, 2023	0.590
In 1988, Sweety takes custody of an orphaned Carolyn. In the present, she and Raylan confirm that Trennell moved the gun. Sandy refuses to testify against Mansell and goes to Skender, who threatens her life. Mansell threatens Carolyn into remaining his lawyer. As Downey brings in the man who found Guy's body and tries to frame him as the killer, Raylan realizes she is in the notebook. Witnessing this, Bryl admits to framing guilty criminals with planted evidence and gives Raylan Mansell's gun. Sandy flees with Mansell's money as the owner of her penthouse returns. Mansell holds him hostage to try to get her to come back and kills him despite her setting up a meeting. Raylan goes in her place, but their confrontation is stopped when the Albanians, alerted by Carolyn, kidnap them both. They throw Mansell's gun into the Rouge.
8	"The Question"	Michael Dinner	Dave Andron & Michael Dinner	August 29, 2023	0.670
The Albanians bring Raylan and Mansell to Skender's house, where the former is allowed to seal the latter inside the safe room to die. The police detain Downey with intent to charge her. Carolyn implicates Rogers as corrupt in hopes of getting Guy's position. Skender, wanting to kill Mansell and regain his honor, opens the room but is killed by Mansell, who massacres and robs the Albanians. Suspecting he will go after Carolyn next, Raylan waits for him in her house and kills him when he reaches for what Raylan believes is a gun, actually a cassette tape of Mansell's music. Raylan returns to Miami and retires despite a retiring Dan Grant offering to give him his position as chief deputy. Carolyn, now a judge, writes to him and asks to meet him again someday. In Kentucky, Boyd fakes an illness and seduces a guard to escape from prison. Out on a boat with Raylan, Willa's question about why he quit is interrupted by a call from the Lexington marshal's office.

== Production ==
The production team behind Justified announced that it was working together to develop a new series based on City Primeval by Elmore Leonard in March 2021. At the time, it was rumored to possibly be a Justified spin-off series. FX confirmed the Justified revival speculation in January 2022 by announcing that a new Justified miniseries was in development, taking inspiration from City Primeval. Dave Andron and Michael Dinner were set as the showrunners, and Dinner would direct as well. City Primeval follows a different character, so the story is being adjusted to use Raylan Givens as the protagonist instead. In February 2022, reports surfaced that Quentin Tarantino was in talks to possibly direct an episode or two as well since he is a fan of Leonard's work, having adapted Leonard's novel Rum Punch into the film Jackie Brown, along with taking inspiration from Leonard in Tarantino's other works. In April 2022, Tarantino was confirmed to not be directing the series.

Timothy Olyphant agreed to reprise the role of Deputy U.S. Marshal Raylan Givens. In May 2022, just before the start of production in Chicago, casting announcements added several starring actors to the cast, including Aunjanue Ellis, Boyd Holbrook, Adelaide Clemens, Vondie Curtis-Hall, Marin Ireland, Victor Williams, Norbert Leo Butz, and Timothy Olyphant's daughter, Vivian Olyphant. Ravi Patel was also added as a recurring cast member shortly afterward.

The production was temporarily halted while filming in Chicago when four cars broke through set barricades while engaged in a gunfight. Sony Pictures Television increased security to the production, but three weeks later, filming was interrupted again when an incendiary device was thrown towards the set. The device did not explode, and no one was injured.

== Release ==
Justified: City Primeval had its world premiere on the opening night of the 12th ATX Television Festival on June 1, 2023. It debuted FX on July 18, 2023, with the first two episodes. The series began streaming on Star on Disney+ in Australia and New Zealand beginning July 19. Sony Pictures Home Entertainment released the entire series on DVD and Blu-ray on November 14, 2023.

== Reception ==
=== Critical response ===
On review aggregator Rotten Tomatoes, the series holds a score of 91% based on 47 reviews, with an average rating of 7.8/10. The website's critics consensus is, "Timothy Olyphant's quickdraw charm shows no signs of dulling in City Primeval, an introspective and very welcome return for Raylan Givens." On Metacritic, it has a weighted average score of 79 out of 100 based on 26 critics, indicating "generally favorable reviews".

Chris Vognar of TheWrap highlighted how Justified: City Primeval adeptly moves Raylan Givens from Kentucky to Detroit, with Timothy Olyphant seamlessly slipping back into his iconic role. Vognar complimented the show's ability to preserve Elmore Leonard's unique style, combining a gritty atmosphere with sharp dialogue. Vognar also noted the series' successful balance of crime and personal moments, including touching scenes with Raylan's daughter, played by Olyphant's real-life daughter. Marcus Shorter of Consequence noted that the creative team achieved the remarkable feat of advancing their successful show without compromising its legacy. Shorter praised them for crafting a compelling narrative that felt both essential to the characters and engaging for the audience. Matt Webb Mitovich of TVLine commended Justified: City Primeval for its transition of Raylan Givens from Kentucky to Detroit, the introduction of the antagonist, Clement Mansell, and its adaptation to the new urban setting. Mitovich praised Timothy Olyphant's performance and the chemistry with his real-life daughter, Vivian. The supporting cast was noted for their contributions to the story's depth. Although there is some nostalgia for the original setting, Mitovich deemed the series a well-crafted and enjoyable revival of Raylan Givens.

Joel Keller of Decider complimented Justified: City Primeval for preserving the original series' blend of lightness and wit, largely due to Timothy Olyphant's portrayal of Raylan Givens. Keller noted that the show effectively incorporates Raylan into Elmore Leonard's "City Primeval" narrative, establishing an engaging "cowboy cop in the city" dynamic. The series was commended for being welcoming to new viewers while maintaining a sense of familiarity for long-time fans. Keller also highlighted the show's successful balance between introducing new characters and retaining familiar elements, appreciating the depth of character interactions. Emma John of The Guardian gave the series a score of four out of five stars. They praised the series for successfully reviving Timothy Olyphant's role as Raylan Givens, noting that the character remains compelling even after a decade. John's review highlights Olyphant's performance and the show's strong ensemble cast as key strengths, although they acknowledged that the series doesn't entirely shed the shadow of its predecessor's acclaim.

Kelly Lawler of USA Today remarked that Justified: City Primeval aims to recapture the charm of its predecessor by reinstating Timothy Olyphant as Raylan Givens. While Olyphant seamlessly reprises his role and Aunjanue Ellis delivers a notable performance, the series falls short of capturing the essence of the original. According to Lawler, the Detroit setting, despite attempts to portray it as a unique hub of corruption, fails to evoke the distinctive atmosphere of Harlan County. The narrative is perceived as disjointed and lacking emotional depth, which diminishes engagement with the new characters and their conflicts. Although the series maintains some of the original's appeal, it often feels like a relic from a previous era, struggling to connect with contemporary audiences. Verne Gay of Newsday gave Justified: City Primeval a score of 2.5 out of 5 stars, praising Timothy Olyphant's return as Raylan Givens but criticizing the series' transition from Harlan County to Detroit as somewhat implausible and disjointed. The storyline, reminiscent of earlier seasons, was seen as occasionally outdated and lacking the dynamism of its predecessors. Nonetheless, Gay acknowledged the series' strong cast, including Aunjanue Ellis and Vondie Curtis-Hall, and its evocative setting. However, Boyd Holbrook's portrayal of the antagonist was deemed less compelling compared to Walton Goggins' previous performance.

=== Viewership ===
Justified: City Primeval attracted an average of 1.8 million viewers on cable during the summer of 2023. The streaming aggregator Reelgood, which monitors real-time data from 5 million users in the U.S. for original and acquired streaming programs and movies across subscription video-on-demand (SVOD) and ad-supported video-on-demand (AVOD) services, reported that Justified: City Primeval was the most-streamed program in the U.S. during the week of July 17–23, and the sixth during the week of July 27, 2023. JustWatch, a guide to streaming content with access to data from more than 20 million users around the world, estimated that it was the top-streamed television series in the U.S. for the week of July 23, the fifth during the week of August 27, and the eighth during the week of September 3, 2023.

=== Accolades ===
Timothy Olyphant and Aunjanue Ellis-Taylor were respectively nominated for Best Actor in a Drama Series and Best Actress in a Drama Series at the 29th Critics' Choice Awards.
