= The Free World =

2016 film

- Film poster
- Directed by: Jason Lew
- Written by: Jason Lew
- Produced by: Laura Rister
- Starring: Boyd Holbrook
- Cinematography: Bérénice Eveno
- Edited by: Dominic LaPerriere
- Music by: Tim Hecker
- Release dates: January 26, 2016 (Sundance); September 23, 2016 (US)
- Running time: 100 minutes
- Country: United States
- Language: English
- Budget: $1.8 million

The Free World is a 2016 American drama film directed by Jason Lew. It was shown in the U.S. Dramatic Competition section at the 2016 Sundance Film Festival.

== Plot ==
Martin "Mohamed" Lundy (Boyd Holbrook) has been released by the efforts of the Innocence Project after at least 17 years in prison and is working at Second Chance animal shelter run by Linda Workman (Octavia Spencer) in Louisiana. A badly injured dog is brought in by Doris Lamb (Elisabeth Moss) and her unsympathetic husband John, a police officer. The dog is put down due to his injuries. Doris later comes back to the shelter incapable of caring for herself. Mohamed takes her in without anyone knowing about it. He learns that Doris' husband has been killed and his wife is a person of interest. Law enforcement look to Mohamed to provide the information needed to solve the murder. Mohamed and Doris grow to respect each other. No one is aware that she is holing up at Mohamed's.

Doris imagines she sees her dog outside Mohamed's apartment, and while going after it locks herself out. Mohamed comes home to find her waiting at the door subsequently, their thoughts are that law enforcement will capture them, so they go on the run. They make contact with Mohamed's friend from prison, who takes him to someone that will take them to safety, but are themselves held captive. They escape but are stopped on the highway by law enforcement, and are captured after a stand-off. Mohamed reaches for something, law enforcement shooting him in the process, and from out of his pocket drops prayer beads.

Mohamed survives his injuries, and is free as his lawyer works out a favorable deal. He visits Doris where she is incarcerated; it is not clear whether she has been convicted of manslaughter or murder, but she believes she belongs there for taking a life.

== Cast ==
- Boyd Holbrook as Martin "Mohamed" Lundy
- Elisabeth Moss as Doris Lamb
- Octavia Spencer as Linda Workman
- Sung Kang as Detective Shin
- Sue-Lynn Ansari as Diner Waitress
- James Moses Black as Officer Smith

== Critical response ==
On review aggregator website Rotten Tomatoes, the film has rating of 50%, based on 18 reviews, with an average rating of 5.1/10. On Metacritic the film has a score of 46 out of 100 score, based on 5 critics, indicating "mixed or average reviews".
