= John Lindley (cinematographer) =

American cinematographer (born 1951)

John Lindley, A.S.C.
- Born: John Warwick Lindley; November 17, 1951 (age 74); New York City, New York, U.S.
- Occupation: Cinematographer
- Years active: 1971-present

John Warwick Lindley (born November 17, 1951) is an American cinematographer. He has collaborated with Joseph Ruben, Phil Alden Robinson, and Nora Ephron. He is known for his work on such films as Field of Dreams and Pleasantville, the latter of which earning him positive reviews and nominations for awards. He is also the current National President of the International Cinematographers Guild.

== Life and career ==
Born in New York City, Lindley began his career on several TV movies such as The Gentleman Bandit and Mr. Griffin and Me as well as 12 episodes of the TV series Nurse. Lindley's first major cinematography job was on the 1987 horror film, The Stepfather. He worked on Field of Dreams with Phil Alden Robinson and soon worked on Robinson's other films Sneakers and The Sum of All Fears.

In 1999, his work on Pleasantville was honoured by three nominations from the Satellite Awards and the Online Film Critics Society. In 2012, his Pan Am pilot earned a nomination for Outstanding Achievement in Cinematography in One-Hour Episodic/Pilot Television by the American Society of Cinematographers.

In March 2020, Lindley was elected President of the International Cinematographers Guild. He was succeeded by Baird Steptoe Sr. in May 2022, after Lindley announced he would not be seeking a second term. Lindley was reelected President in April 2025.

== Filmography ==
=== Film ===
Year	Title	Director	Notes
1983	He Makes Me Feel Like Dancin'	Emile Ardolino	Documentary; With Francis Kenny, Don Lenzer, James McCalmont, Phil Parmet, Scott Sorenson and Carl Teitelbaum
1984	The Goodbye People	Herb Gardner	
1984	Lily in Love	Károly Makk	
1986	Killer Party	William Fruet	
1986	Home of the Brave	Laurie Anderson	Concert film
1987	The Stepfather	Joseph Ruben	
1987	In the Mood	Phil Alden Robinson	
1988	The Serpent and the Rainbow	Wes Craven	
1988	Shakedown	James Glickenhaus	With Jennifer Cox
1989	True Believer	Joseph Ruben	
1989	Field of Dreams	Phil Alden Robinson	
1989	Immediate Family	Jonathan Kaplan	
1990	Vital Signs	Marisa Silver	
1991	Sleeping with the Enemy	Joseph Ruben	
1991	Father of the Bride	Charles Shyer	
1992	Sneakers	Phil Alden Robinson	
1993	The Good Son	Joseph Ruben	
1994	I Love Trouble	Charles Shyer	
1995	Money Train	Joseph Ruben	
1996	Michael	Nora Ephron	
1998	Pleasantville	Gary Ross	
1998	You've Got Mail	Nora Ephron	
2000	Lucky Numbers	Nora Ephron	
2002	The Sum of All Fears	Phil Alden Robinson	
2003	The Core	Jon Amiel	
2004	The Last Shot	Jeff Nathanson	
2005	Bewitched	Nora Ephron	
2006	Catch and Release	Susannah Grant	
2007	Mr. Brooks	Bruce A. Evans	
2007	Reservation Road	Terry George	
2009	Imagine That	Karey Kirkpatrick	
2010	Legion	Scott Stewart	
2010	The Last Song	Julie Anne Robinson	
2014	St. Vincent	Theodore Melfi	
2017	Father Figures	Lawrence Sher	

=== Television ===
Year	Title	Notes
1981	The Gentleman Bandit	Television film
1981	Nurse	12 episodes
1982	ABC Afterschool Special	1 episode
1983	Girls of the White Orchid	Television film
1984	The Baron and the Kid	Television film
1985	Cinemax Comedy Experiment	1 episode
1985	Badge of the Assassin	Television film
1986	Rockabye	Television film
1987	Rags to Riches	1 episode
1987	The New Adventures of Beans Baxter	1 episode
1987	LBJ: The Early Years	Television film
1987	Poor Little Rich Girl: The Barbara Hutton Story	Television film With Alan Hume
2000	Freedom Song	Television film With Amy Vincent
2011	Pan Am	1 episode
2013	Witches of East End	1 episode
2014	Manhattan	2 episodes
2015	Good Girls Revolt	1 episode
2016	The Affair	1 episode
2017	Time After Time	1 episode
2017-2018	Snowfall	10 episodes
2018	Electric Dreams	2 episodes
2018	Deception	1 episode
2019	Divorce	6 episodes
2019	Castle Rock	1 episode
2019	Unbelievable	Miniseries, 2 episodes
2020	Manhunt	6 episodes
2020-2021	Your Honor	7 episodes
2022	The Woman in the House Across the Street from the Girl in the Window	Miniseries, 8 episodes
2023	Hunters	1 episode
2023	Justified: City Primeval	Miniseries, 3 episodes
2024-present	Dark Matter	7 episodes
2024	Tulsa King	6 episodes

== Awards and nominations ==
Year	Award	Category	Title	Result
1998	Boston Society of Film Critics	Best Cinematography	Pleasantville	Nominated
1998	Online Film Critics Society	Best Cinematography	Pleasantville	Nominated
1998	Satellite Awards	Best Cinematography	Pleasantville	Nominated
2012	Primetime Emmy Awards	Outstanding Cinematography	Pan Am	Nominated
2012	American Society of Cinematographers	Outstanding Achievement in Cinematography	Pan Am	Nominated
2014	American Society of Cinematographers	Outstanding Achievement in Cinematography in Limited Series	Manhattan	Won
2022	American Society of Cinematographers	President's Award		Won
