= Peter Leonard (author) =

American novelist

- Born: Detroit, Michigan, U.S.
- Occupation: Author
- Spouse: Julie
- Children: 4
- Parent(s): Elmore Leonard; Beverly Claire Cline
- Writing career
- Genre: Crime fiction
- Website: www.peterleonardbooks.com

Peter Leonard, the son of author Elmore Leonard, is an American author of crime novels.

In 1980, Peter was the founding partner of the advertising agency Leonard Mayer & Tocco. For nearly thirty years LM&T created award-winning advertising for Volkswagen of America, Audi of America, Hiram Walker, and Pennzoil.

He wrote his first novel, Quiver, in 2007; he has since published eight more novels and retired from advertising in 2009 to write fiction full time.

He is the father of four children and lives in Michigan (native of Detroit) with his wife, Julie, and his dog, Sam.

He is the author of:

- Quiver
- Trust Me
- All He Saw Was The Girl
- Voices of the Dead
- Back from the Dead (sequel to Voices of the Dead)
- Eyes Closed Tight
- Unknown Remains
- Raylan Goes To Detroit
- Sweet Dreams
