= Michael Dinner =

American television director, producer and writer

- Born: May 20, 1953 (age 73); United States
- Occupations: Director, producer, screenwriter, singer, songwriter
- Notable work: Heaven Help Us; The Crew

Michael Dinner (born May 20, 1953) is an American director, producer, and screenwriter for television.

== Biography ==
Prior to his TV career, Dinner was a singer-songwriter and recording artist for Fantasy Records, where he released two albums, The Great Pretender (1974) and Tom Thumb the Dreamer (1976), along with four singles.

In the early 1980s, Dinner attended the American Film Institute (AFI), where he directed a highly regarded student film, Miss Lonelyhearts, adapted from the classic novel by Nathanael West. It originally aired on PBS's American Playhouse series and won the Prix de la Jeunesse (Youth Film Award) at the Cannes Film Festival.

In 2017, Dinner wrote and directed an episode of the Channel 4/Amazon Video series Philip K. Dick's Electric Dreams. He also served as an executive producer.

He graduated from Harvard College.

== Filmography ==
Film

Year	Title	Director	Producer	Notes
1985	Heaven Help Us	Yes	No	
1986	Off Beat	Yes	No	
1988	Hot to Trot	Yes	No	
2000	The Crew	Yes	No	

Television

Year	Title	Director	Executive producer	Notes
1989-1993	The Wonder Years	Yes	Yes	19 episodes
1994	Thicker Than Blood: The Larry McLinden Story	Yes	No	TV movie
1994-1995	Chicago Hope	Yes	Co-Executive	5 episodes
1996-1997	Early Edition	Yes	Yes	3 episodes
2003	Karen Sisco	Yes	Yes	2 episodes
2005	Invasion	Yes	No	1 episode
2005	Grey's Anatomy	Yes	No	1 episode
2006	Kidnapped	Yes	Yes	2 episodes
2008	Sons of Anarchy	Yes	No	1 episode
2008-2009	Law & Order	Yes	No	2 episodes
2010-2013	Justified	Yes	Yes	5 episodes
2013	Masters of Sex	Yes	No	2 episodes
2016	The Get Down	Yes	No	1 episode
2017-2018	Sneaky Pete	Yes	No	3 episodes
2018	Electric Dreams	Yes	No	1 episode
2019	Blood & Treasure	Yes	No	1 episode
2019	Unbelievable	Yes	No	3 episodes
2020	Amazing Stories	Yes	No	1 episode
2021	Mayans M.C.	Yes	No	2 episodes
2023	Justified: City Primeval	Yes	No	3 episodes
2024-2026	Silo	Yes	No	7 episodes
