= Victor Williams =

American actor (born 1970)

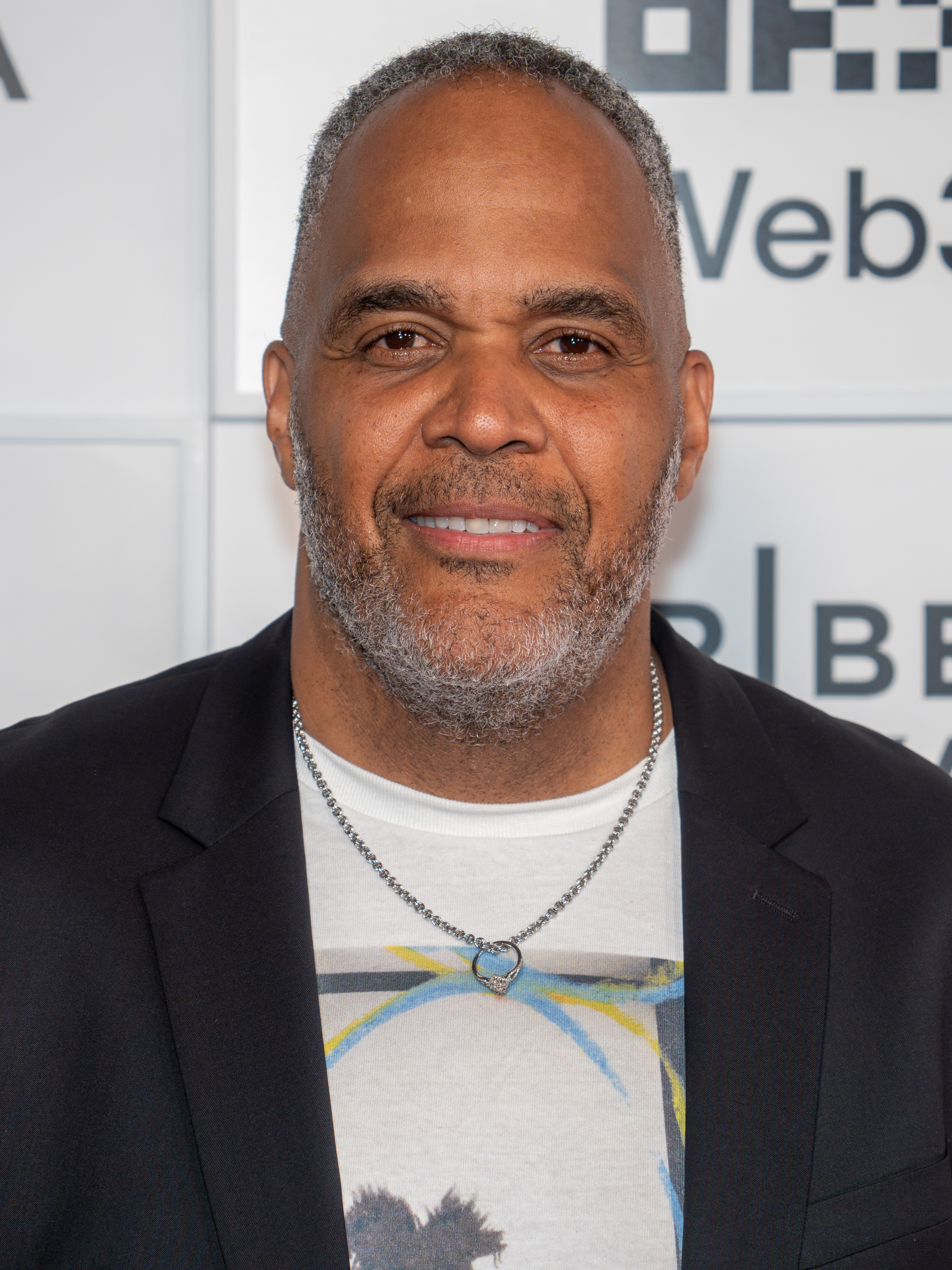
- Williams in 2025
- Born: September 19, 1970 (age 55); Brooklyn, New York, U.S.
- Education: State University of New York, Binghamton (BA); New York University (MFA)
- Occupation: Actor
- Years active: 1984–present

Victor L. Williams (born September 19, 1970) is an American actor best known as Doug Heffernan's (Kevin James) best friend Deacon Palmer on The King of Queens. He has also appeared on several other hit TV shows, including Homicide: Life on the Street, Law & Order, ER, New York Undercover, Girlfriends, Fringe and The Jamie Foxx Show. In 2012, Williams was seen and heard as a pitchman for Verizon Fios television commercials.

== Early life ==
Williams was born in Brooklyn, New York. He attended Midwood High School, where he played on the school basketball team with his height at 6 feet 5.5 inches (197 cm). He went on to attend college at Binghamton University in Upstate New York. Then he received a Master of Fine Arts degree in acting from New York University's Graduate Acting Program at the Tisch School of the Arts.

== Filmography ==
=== Film ===
Year	Title	Role	Notes
1984	Boggy Creek II: And the Legend Continues	Little Creature	
1984	Beat Street	Onlooker	
1996	The Preacher's Wife	Robbie	
1997	Cop Land	Russell	
1997	A Brooklyn State of Mind	Black Man	
1999	Graham's Diner	-	
1999	Disaster Video	Security Guard	Short
2001	Me & Mrs. Jones	Jersey	
2003	With or Without You	Kenneth	
2003	The Animatrix	Dan	Voice, direct-to-video
2003	World Record	Dan	Voice, short
2004	First Breath	Eddie	Short
2005	Bewitched	Police Officer	
2005	The Toy Warrior	Voice	
2006	Traci Townsend	Darrell	
2007	A New Tomorrow	Joby / Interviewer	
2008	Tomorrow Never Knows	Kevin	Short
2009	Lenox Avenue	Dallas Kirkland	
2009	Release	Reggie	Short
2009	Dream State	Dr. Forsythe	Short
2010	Notes on Being Young	Dr. Christenfeld	Short
2011	Kissed by the Devil	Jordan King	Short
2012	Single Hills	Rob Francis	
2012	It's Just Funny I'm Saying	Don Jaun	Television film
2013	Home	Hamilton	
2013	80/20	Vic	
2014	Hungry Hearts	Social Worker	
2015	I'll Text You	-	Short
2016	Saturday in the Park	Henry	
2017	Trouble	Ray	
2017	November Criminals	Mr. Broadus	
2018	The Land of Steady Habits	Howard	
2018	Jewtah	Lone Man	
2023	Dig Deeper	Gerry	Short, Executive Producer
2025	The Home	Couper	

=== Television ===
Year	Film	Role	Notes
1996	Homicide: Life on the Street	Ishmael Al-Hadj	Episode: "Scene of the Crime"
1997	Law & Order	Uniform Policeman Wilson	Episode: "Legacy"
1997	New York Undercover	Freddie James	Episode: "The Solomon Papers"
1997	Profiler	Det. Beckley	Episode: "Blue Highway"
1998	The Jamie Foxx Show	Leon	Episode: "Soul Mate to Cellmate"
1998-2001	ER	Roger McGrath	Recurring cast: season 4, guest: season 5 & 7
1998-2007	The King of Queens	Deacon Palmer	Main cast
2000	The Practice	Officer Craig Armstrong	Episode: "Blowing Smoke"
2003	Justice League	Snooty British Director, Lieutenant	Voice, episode: "Eclipsed"
2005	Love, Inc.	Marcus	Episode: "Pilot"
2008	Girlfriends	Mr. Hines	Episode: "Stand and Deliver"
2009	Flight of the Conchords	Police Officer West	Recurring cast: season 2
2009	Fringe	Phil	Episode: "Inner Child"
2010	Mercy	Robert Mercer	Episode: "I Saw This Pig and I Thought of You"
2010	Blue Bloods	Oliver	Episode: "Samaritan"
2012	Delocated	Friend	Episode: "Friend"
2012	NYC 22	Sgt. Michael Conrad	Recurring cast
2013	The Michael J. Fox Show	Todd	Episode: "Interns"
2014	The Leftovers	Ron Jensen	Episode: "Penguin One, Us Zero"
2014	The Good Wife	Carter Greyson	Episode: "Sticky Content"
2014-18	The Affair	Detective Jeffries	Recurring cast: season 1-2 & 4
2016	The Blacklist	Officer	Episode: "Susan Hargrave"
2016	High Maintenance	Mike	Episode: "Museebat"
2016	People of Earth	Assessor	Recurring cast: season 1
2017	Sneaky Pete	Richard	Recurring cast: season 1
2017	Madam Secretary	Anthony Colvert	Episode: "Minefield"
2018	Elementary	Jon Hoyt	Episode: "The Worms Crawl in, the Worms Crawl Out"
2018	The Sinner	D.A. Hutchinson	Recurring cast: season 2
2018-19	Happy Together	Gerald	Main cast
2018-21	Bull	AUSA Rosenberg	Recurring cast: season 2, guest: season 5
2020	The Neighborhood	Pastor Don	Episode: "Welcome to the New Pastor"
2020	Hunters	Detective Kennedy Groton	Recurring cast
2020	The Good Lord Bird	Coachman Jim	Recurring cast
2021	FBI: Most Wanted	Special Agent Moses Reed	Episode: "Chattaboogie"
2021	A Luv Tale: The Series	Preston/George	Recurring cast
2022	The Righteous Gemstones	Makawon Butterfield	Episode: "I Speak in the Tongues of Men and Angels"
2023	Justified: City Primeval	Wendell Robinson	Main cast
2024	Elsbeth	Aaron Pritchard	Episode: "The Wrong Stuff"
