= Boyd Holbrook =

American actor (born 1981)

- Holbrook in 2026
- Born: Robert Boyd Holbrook; September 1, 1981 (age 45); Prestonsburg, Kentucky, U.S.
- Occupation: Actor
- Years active: 2001–present
- Spouse: Tatiana Pajkovic (m. 2018)
- Children: 2

Robert Boyd Holbrook (born September 1, 1981) is an American actor. He made his acting debut in the 2008 Gus Van Sant film Milk and had his breakthrough portraying DEA agent Steve Murphy in the Netflix television series Narcos (2015–2016).

His acting credits include the television programs Hatfields & McCoys (2012), The Sandman (2022–2025), Justified: City Primeval (2023), The Morning Show, and the films Little Accidents (2014), The Skeleton Twins (2014), A Walk Among the Tombstones (2014), Logan (2017), The Predator (2018), O.G. (2019), Vengeance (2022), Indiana Jones and the Dial of Destiny (2023), The Bikeriders (2023), and A Complete Unknown (2024).

== Early life ==
Holbrook was born in Prestonsburg, Kentucky, the son of Ellen, a real estate agent, and Don Holbrook, a coal miner. Holbrook was raised in Harlan County, Kentucky. After graduating from high school, Holbrook worked at United Parcel Service and for a department store, with the latter changing his career focus towards acting after meeting fellow Kentuckian and actor Michael Shannon.

== Career ==
Holbrook was discovered while working part-time as a carpenter for Jenny Wiley Theatre in Kentucky. He signed with Elite Models in 2001. He has worked for other agencies such as Wilhelmina Models. Holbrook has been a model for such designers and labels as Dior, Gucci, Jean Paul Gaultier, Versace, Hugo Boss, Bill Blass, Calvin Klein, Moschino, Marc Jacobs and DSquared².

Holbrook and model Omahyra Mota were the subjects of photographer Ellen Von Unwerth Paris gallery exhibition "Omahyra & Boyd" and the 2005 book of that title from Exhibitions Internationales (ISBN 2-914171-20-X).

He released a short series of poems through the website Model-Max.com, accompanied by illustrations by Jamie Strachan.

Holbrook studied acting with the William Esper Studio's two-year Meisner Acting Program and with Shane Ann Younts' two-year voice and speech program, and he received an SCPS Certificate in 16mm film from New York University. He also has worked with acting coach Terry Knickerbocker.

His prior acting work includes a role in the "Allison" music video for Permanent Me alongside model Tiah Eckhardt.

Holbrook is a photographer who has done work for David Armstrong. He is also a sculptor and exhibited his work in his first art show, "Iscariot", at the Rare gallery in Chelsea, New York from April 19 to May 17, 2008.

In 2014, Holbrook appeared as Jeff in David Fincher's psychological thriller Gone Girl.

Holbrook portrayed DEA agent Steve Murphy in the Netflix series Narcos. In 2017, Holbrook played Donald Pierce, the antagonist in Logan, the third solo Wolverine film. In 2019, Holbrook starred as Thomas Lockhart in the Netflix thriller film, In the Shadow of the Moon.

In January 2021, Holbrook was cast as The Corinthian in the Netflix adaptation of The Sandman.

In May 2021, Holbrook was cast in Indiana Jones and the Dial of Destiny. He played Klaber, a Nazi operative and right-hand man to Mads Mikkelsen's Dr. Jürgen Voller. Holbrook stated that he learned several acting lessons from Harrison Ford while filming Dial of Destiny, including how "[he] definitely taught me that you do not walk away unless you know in your gut that you got it and there's not a false note." Dial of Destiny was also Holbrook's second collaboration with Logan director James Mangold; Holbrook defended the movie's conclusion, stating that "when I saw [the finale], I was surprised that it grabbed me by the throat. I was a little emotional, even though I'm so close to it."

== Personal life ==
In 2002, Holbrook began a very intimate relationship with renowned supermodel Omahyra Mota, which went on til late 2005. Their relationship was partially chronicled in a photo book titled Omahyra & Boyd, in early 2005 by photographer Ellen von Unwerth. Holbrook started dating actress Elizabeth Olsen in 2012 after meeting on the set of the movie Very Good Girls. They got engaged in March 2014 but, in October 2014, Olsen ended their engagement.

He married Danish artist Tatiana Pajkovic in 2018. On January 15, 2018, Pajkovic gave birth to a son. The couple had their second child, a daughter, in November 2024.

== Filmography ==
Key
| † | Denotes works that have not yet been released |

=== Film ===
| Year | Film | Role | Notes |
|---|---|---|---|
| 2008 | Milk | Denton Smith | |
| 2011 | Higher Ground | Teenage Ethan Miller | Also performed two songs which were featured on the film's soundtrack. |
| 2011 | The Reunion | Douglas Cleary | |
| 2011 | Moving Takahashi | Craig | Short film |
| 2012 | The Magic of Belle Isle | Luke Ford | |
| 2013 | The Host | Kyle O'Shea | |
| 2013 | Out of the Furnace | Tattooed Guy | |
| 2014 | The Skeleton Twins | Billy | |
| 2014 | Little Accidents | Amos Jenkins | |
| 2014 | Very Good Girls | David Avery | |
| 2014 | A Walk Among the Tombstones | Peter Kristo | |
| 2014 | Gone Girl | Jeff | |
| 2015 | Run All Night | Daniel "Danny" Maguire | |
| 2016 | The Free World | Mo Lundy | |
| 2016 | Jane Got a Gun | Vic Owen | |
| 2016 | Morgan | Skip Vronsky | |
| 2016 | Cardboard Boxer | Pinky | |
| 2017 | Song to Song | | Scenes deleted |
| 2017 | Logan | Donald Pierce | |
| 2017 | Boomtown | Dustin | |
| 2018 | O.G. | Pinkins | |
| 2018 | The Predator | Quinn McKenna | |
| 2018 | Time of Day | Himself | Short film |
| 2019 | In the Shadow of the Moon | Thomas Lockhart | |
| 2019 | Two/One | Kaden | |
| 2020 | We Can Be Heroes | Miracle Guy | |
| 2021 | The Cursed | John McBride | |
| 2021 | Beckett | Stephen Tynan | |
| 2022 | Vengeance | Ty Shaw | |
| 2023 | Indiana Jones and the Dial of Destiny | Klaber | |
| 2023 | The Bikeriders | Cal | |
| 2024 | A Complete Unknown | Johnny Cash | Also performed two songs which were featured on the film's soundtrack. |
| 2026 | Atonement | Lou D'Alessandro | |

=== Television ===
| Year | Film | Role | Notes |
|---|---|---|---|
| 2009 | The Unusuals | Punk | Episode: "42" |
| 2009 | The Beautiful Life | Gabriel | Episode: "Pilot" |
| 2010 | Tough Trade | Jackson Tucker | TV movie |
| 2011 | The Big C | Mykail | Recurring role (season 2) |
| 2012 | Hatfields & McCoys | William "Cap" Hatfield | Main cast (miniseries) |
| 2013 | Behind the Candelabra | Cary James | TV movie |
| 2015–2016 | Narcos | DEA agent Steve Murphy | Main cast (seasons 1–2) |
| 2020 | Robot Chicken | Deacon Frost | Episode: "Buster Olive in: The Monkey Got Closer Overnight" (voice roles) |
| 2020 | The Fugitive | Mike Ferro | Title role |
| 2021 | The Premise | Aaron | Episode: "Moment of Silence" |
| 2022–2025 | The Sandman | The Corinthian | Main cast |
| 2023 | Justified: City Primeval | Clement Mansell | Main cast |
| 2025 | The Morning Show | Brodie Hartman | Main cast (season 4) |

=== Video game ===
| Year | Game | Role | Notes |
|---|---|---|---|
| 2019 | Narcos: Rise of the Cartels | Steve Murphy | Based on the TV series of the same name |

== Awards and nominations ==
| Year | Award | Category | Nominated work | Result | Ref. |
|---|---|---|---|---|---|
| 2012 | Hamptons International Film Festival | Breakthrough Performer | The Host | Won | |
| 2014 | Milano International Film Festival Awards | Best Actor | Little Accidents | Nominated | |
| 2024 | Screen Actors Guild Awards | Outstanding Performance by a Stunt Ensemble in a Motion Picture | Indiana Jones and the Dial of Destiny | Nominated | |
| 2025 | Screen Actors Guild Awards | Outstanding Performance by a Cast in a Motion Picture | A Complete Unknown | Nominated | |
