= List of films: D =

indexed lists of films
0–9	A	B	C	D	E	F
G	H	I	J–K	L	M	N–O
P	Q–R	S	T	U–V–W	X–Y–Z	

This is an alphabetical list of film articles (or sections within articles about films). It includes made for television films. See the talk page for the method of indexing used.

== D ==
- D'Artagnan and Three Musketeers (1978) (TV)
- D’Love (2010)
- D.A.R.Y.L. (1985)
- D.C. Cab (1983)
- D.E.B.S. (2003 & 2004)
- D.I.Y. or Die: How to Survive as an Independent Artist (2002)
- D.O.A. (1950 & 1988)
- D.W. Griffith's 'Abraham Lincoln' (1930)
- D-Day (2013)
- D-Tox (2002)
- D-War (2007)
- D2: The Mighty Ducks (1994)
- D3: The Mighty Ducks (1996)
- DC League of Super-Pets (2022)
- DC Super Hero Girls series:
  - DC Super Hero Girls: Super Hero High (2016 TV)
  - DC Super Hero Girls: Hero of the Year (2016)
  - DC Super Hero Girls: Intergalactic Games (2017)
  - Lego DC Super Hero Girls: Brain Drain (2017)
  - Lego DC Super Hero Girls: Super-Villain High (2017)
  - DC Super Hero Girls: Legends of Atlantis (2018)
- DOA: Dead or Alive (2006)

=== Da ===
- Da (1988)
- Da Game of Life (1998)
- Da grande (1987)
- Da Hip Hop Witch (2000)
- Da One That Ghost Away (2018)
- Da Possessed (2014)
- Da, smert (2004)
- Da Sweet Blood of Jesus (2014)
- The Da Vinci Code (2006)
- Da 5 Bloods (2020)

==== Daa ====
- Daaaaaalí! (2023)
- Daada (1988)
- Daadagiri (1997)
- Daadi Maa (1966)
- Daaera (1953)
- Daag (1952)
- Daag (1973)
- Daag: The Fire (1999)
- Daaham (1965)
- Daaka (2019)
- Daaku Aur Jawan (1978)
- Daaku Dilruba (2000)
- Daal Chawal (2019)
- Daal Mein Kuch Kaala Hai (2012)
- Daaliya Pookkal (1980)
- Daaman Aur Aag (1973)
- Daana Paani (1953)
- Daana Paani (1989)
- Daana Paani (2018)
- Daana Veera Soora Karna (1977)
- Daani (2006)
- Daar doer in die bosveld (1951)
- Daari Tappida Maga (1975)
- Daas (2005)
- Daas (2011)
- Daas Dev (2018)
- Daasa (2003)
- Daasi (1952)
- Daasi (1988)
- Daata (1989)
- Daava (1997)
- Daayen Ya Baayen (2010)
- Daayraa (1996)

==== Dab–Dad ====
- Dabak Daba Aisa (2016)
- Dabang Sarkar (2018)
- Dabangg series:
  - Dabangg (2010)
  - Dabangg 2 (2012)
  - Dabangg 3 (2019)
- Dabbe: Curse of the Jinn (2013)
- Dabbevariki Chedu (1987)
- Dabbu Bhale Jabbu (1992)
- Dabbuki Lokam Dasoham (1973)
- Dachimawa Lee (2008)
- Dacii (1967)
- Dad (1989)
- Dad and Dave Come to Town (1938)
- Dad and Dave: On Our Selection (1995)
- Dad, I'm Sorry (2021)
- Dad Made Dirty Movies (2011)
- Dad Rudd, M.P. (1940)
- Dad Savage (1998)
- Dad Wanted (2020)
- Dad's Army: (1971 & 2016)
- Dad's in Heaven with Nixon (2010)
- Dada Is Back (2017)
- Dada Lakhmi (2022)
- Dada Sahib (2000)
- Dada's Dance (2008)
- Dadagiri (1987)
- Dadah Is Death (1986)
- Dadar Kirti (1980)
- Dadayama (1983)
- Daddies (1924)
- Daddio (2023)
- Daddy Day Camp (2007)
- Daddy Day Care (2003)
- Daddy Long Legs: (1931, 1938 & 1955)
- Daddy Longlegs (2009)
- Daddy's Double (1910)
- Daddy's Dyin': Who's Got the Will? (1990)
- Daddy's Home (2015)
- Daddy's Home 2 (2017)
- Daddy's Little Girl (2012)
- Daddy's Little Girls (2007)
- Daddy-Long-Legs: (1919 & 2005)
- Daddy-O (1958)
- Dadnapped (2009 TV)

==== Dae–Dal ====
- Daens (1992)
- Daffodils (2019)
- Daffy Duck's Fantastic Island (1983)
- Daffy Duck's Quackbusters (1988)
- Daft Punk's Electroma (2006)
- Dagger Eyes (1983)
- Dagon (2001)
- Dagny (1977)
- Daguerrotype (2016)
- Dahil Mahal Na Mahal Kita (1998)
- Dahmer (2002)
- Dahini - The Witch (2022)
- Dahomey (2024)
- Dai-bosatsu tōge (1957)
- Daimajin (1966)
- Daina (1984)
- Daisies (1966)
- Daisy: (1923, 1988 & 2006)
- Daisy Belle (2018)
- Daisy Kenyon (1947)
- Daisy Miller (1974)
- Daisy Quokka: World's Scariest Animal (2020)
- Daisy Town (1971)
- Daisy Winters (2017)
- Daivanamathil (2005)
- Daivathinte Makan (2000)
- Dakan (1997)
- Dakota: (1945, 1988 & 2022)
- Dakota Lil (1950)
- Dalagang Ilocana (1954)
- Daleks - Invasion Earth 2150 AD (1966)
- Dallas Buyers Club (2013)
- The Dallas Connection (1994)
- Daltry Calhoun (2005)

==== Dam ====
- Dam 999 (2011)
- The Dam Busters (1955)
- Dam! The Story of Kit the Beaver (2017)
- Dam Street (2005)
- Damadamm! (2011)
- Damadol (2013)
- Damage: (1992, 2009 & 2016)
- Damaged (2024)
- Damaged Care (2002) (TV)
- Damaged Goods: (1914, 1919 & 1937)
- Damaged Hearts (1924)
- Damaged Lives (1933)
- Damal (2022)
- Damals in Paris (1956)
- Daman (2001)
- DAMaN (2022)
- Daman Aur Chingari (1973)
- Damaru Ko Dandibiyo (2018)
- Damarukam (2012)
- Damascus Cover (2017)
- Damascus with Love (2010)
- Damascus Roof and Tales of Paradise (2010)
- Damascus Time (2018)
- Damayanthi (2019)
- Dambé: The Mali Project (2008)
- Dame Care (1928)
- Dame Chance (1926)
- Dame Valerie Adams: More than Gold (2022)
- Dames (1934)
- Dames Ahoy! (1930)
- Les Dames du Bois de Boulogne (1945)
- Dames and Dentists (1920)
- Damien: Omen II (1978)
- Damn Yankees (1958)
- Damnation (1988)
- Damnation Alley (1977)
- The Damned: (1947, 1963, 1969, 2002 & 2013)
- The Damned Don't Cry (1950)
- The Damned United (2009)
- Damsel: (2018 & 2024)
- A Damsel in Distress: (1919 & 1937)
- Damsels in Distress (2011)

==== Dan ====
- Dan in Real Life (2007)
- Dance of the Dead (2008)
- Dance of Death (1969)
- Dance Flick (2009)
- Dance with Me: (1998, 2019 Iranian & 2019 Japanese)
- Dance Party USA (2006)
- The Dance of Reality (2013)
- Dance with a Stranger (1985)
- Dance with the Wind (2004)
- The Dancer: (1915, 1919, 2000, 2011 & 2016)
- Dancer in the Dark (2000)
- The Dancer Upstairs (2002)
- Dancer, Texas Pop. 81 (1998)
- Dances with Wolves (1990)
- Dancing at the Blue Iguana (2000)
- Dancing with Crime (1947)
- Dancing Lady (1933)
- Dancing at Lughnasa (1998)
- The Dancing Masters (1943)
- Dancing Pirate (1936)
- Dancing Queens (2021)
- Dandelion: (2004, 2014 & 2024)
- A Dandy in Aspic (1968)
- Dandy Dick (1935)
- Dang Bireley's and Young Gangsters (1997)
- Danger Lights (1930)
- Danger One (2018)
- Danger on Wheels (1940)
- Danger Within (1959)
- Danger!! Death Ray (1967)
- Danger: Diabolik (1968)
- Dangerous: (1935 & 2021)
- The Dangerous Affair (2015)
- Dangerous Animals (2025)
- Dangerous Beauty (1998)
- Dangerous Curves (1988)
- Dangerous Game: (1937, 1987, 1993 & 2017)
- The Dangerous Game: (1933 & 1942)
- Dangerous Games (1974)
- Dangerous to Know (1938)
- Dangerous Liaisons: (1988, 2005 & 2012)
- Dangerous Lies (2020)
- The Dangerous Lives of Altar Boys (2002)
- Dangerous Living: Coming Out in the Developing World (2003)
- A Dangerous Man: Lawrence After Arabia (1990) (TV)
- Dangerous Men (2005)
- A Dangerous Method (2011)
- Dangerous Minds (1995)
- Dangerous Moves (1984)
- Dangerous Parking (2007)
- Daniel: (1983 & 2019)
- Daniel Isn't Real (2019)
- The Danish Girl (2015)
- Danny, the Champion of the World (1989)
- Danny Deckchair (2004)
- Danny Roane: First Time Director (2006)
- Dante's Inferno: (1924, 1935, 1967 & 2007)
- Dante's Peak (1997)
- Danton (1931, 1932 & 1983)

==== Dap ====
- Daphne: (2007 & 2017)
- Daphne and the Diplomat (1937)
- Daphne and the Pirate (1916)
- Daphne & Velma (2018)
- Daphnis and Chloe (1931)
- Dappankuthu (2024)

==== Dar ====
- Dara of Jasenovac (2021)
- Daraar (1996)
- Darby O'Gill and the Little People (1959)
- Darc (2018)
- The Dare (2019)
- Daredevil (2003)
- A Daring Daylight Burglary (1903)
- The Darjeeling Limited (2007)
- The Dark: (1979, 2005 & 2018)
- Dark August (1976)
- Dark Blood (2012)
- Dark Blue (2002)
- Dark Blue World (2001)
- Dark City: (1950 & 1998)
- Dark Command (1940)
- The Dark Corner (1946)
- Dark Crimes (2016)
- The Dark Crystal (1982)
- Dark Days (2000)
- The Dark Divide (2020)
- Dark Eyes: (1935, 1951 & 1987)
- The Dark Eyes of London (1939)
- Dark Figure of Crime (2018)
- Dark Floors (2008)
- The Dark Half (1993)
- Dark Harvest: (2004, 2016 & 2023)
- Dark Horse: (1992, 2005 & 2011)
- The Dark Horse: (1932, 1946 & 2014)
- Dark Horse: The Incredible True Story of Dream Alliance (2015)
- The Dark Hours (2005)
- Dark Intruder (1965)
- The Dark Knight (2008)
- The Dark Knight Rises (2012)
- Dark Mirror: (1984 TV & 2007)
- The Dark Mirror: (1920 & 1946)
- Dark Money (2018)
- Dark Night: (2005 & 2016)
- The Dark Night (1989)
- Dark Is the Night: (1945 & 2017)
- Dark Night of the Scarecrow (1981) (TV)
- Dark Passage (1947)
- Dark Phoenix (2019)
- Dark Secrets (1923)
- Dark Shadows (2012)
- Dark Side of the Moon (2002) (TV)
- Dark Skies: (1929 & 2013)
- Dark Star (1974)
- Dark Summer (2015)
- Dark of the Sun (1968)
- Dark Tide (2012)
- The Dark Tower: (1943 & 2017)
- A Dark Truth (2012)
- Dark Universe (1993)
- Dark Victory (1939)
- Dark Was the Night: (2014 & 2018)
- Dark Water (2002 & 2005)
- Dark Waters (1944, 1994 & 2019)
- Dark Web: Cicada 3301 (2021)
- The Dark and the Wicked (2020)
- Darkest Hour (2017)
- The Darkest Hour (2011)
- Darkman (1990)
- Darkman II: The Return of Durant (1995)
- Darkman III: Die Darkman Die (1996)
- Darkness: (1916, 1923, 1993, 2002 & 2015)
- The Darkness (2016)
- Darkness Falls: (1999, 2003 & 2020)
- Darkness Rising (2017)
- Darkness in Tallinn (1993)
- Darkon (2006)
- Darkside Blues (1994)
- Darlin' (2019)
- Darling: (1961, 1965, 2007 Indian, 2007 Swedish, 2010, 2012, 2015 American & 2015 Indian)
- Darling Companion (2012)
- Darling Lili (1970)
- The Darling of Paris: (1917 & 1931)
- The Darwin Awards (2006)
- Darwin's Nightmare (2004)

==== Das ====
- Das Boot (1981)
- Das Ka Dhamki (2023)
- Dasara (2023)
- Dasavathaaram (2008)
- Dasavatharam (1976)
- Dasepo Naughty Girls (2006)
- A Dash of Courage (1916)
- Dash and Lilly (1999 TV)
- A Dash of Love (2017 TV)
- A Dash Through the Clouds (1912)
- Dashakriya (2017)
- Dashamukha (2012)
- Dasharatha (2019)
- Dasharatham (1989)
- The Dashing Archduke (1927)
- Dashing in December (2020 TV)
- Dashavathara (1960)
- Dashing Through the Snow (2023)
- Dasvidaniya (2008)
- Dasi Aparanji (1944)
- Dasima (1940)
- Dastaan (1972)
- Dastak: (1970 & 1996)
- Dastan (1950)
- Dasvi (2022)
- Dasvidaniya (2008)

==== Dat ====
- The Date (1992)
- Date with an Angel (1987)
- Date Bait (1960)
- Date Bhet (2023)
- A Date with Darkness: The Trial and Capture of Andrew Luster (2003 TV)
- Date with Disaster (1957)
- A Date with a Dream (1948)
- A Date with the Falcon (1942)
- A Date with Miss Fortune (2015)
- A Date with Judy (1948)
- A Date for Mad Mary (2016)
- Date at Midnight (1959)
- Date Movie (2006)
- Date for a Murder (1966)
- Date Night (2010)
- A Date to Skate (1938)
- A Date at the Tower (1962)
- A Date with Your Family (1950)
- Dateline Diamonds (1966)
- Dating Amber (2020)
- Dating Do's and Don'ts (1949)
- Dating the Enemy (1996)
- The Dating Game (2025)
- Dating Game Killer (2017) (TV)
- Dating Games People Play (2005)
- Dating and New York (2021)

==== Dau ====
- Dau Huduni Methai (2015)
- Daud (1997)
- Daughter: (2014, 2016 & 2019)
- Daughter 2 (1996)
- Daughter Angele (1918)
- Daughter from Danang (2002)
- Daughter of Darkness: (1948, 1990 & 1993)
- Daughter of Dawn (1920)
- Daughter of Deceit (1951)
- Daughter of Destiny (1917)
- The Daughter of Dr. Jekyll (1957)
- Daughter of Don Q (1946)
- Daughter of Mine (2018)
- Daughter of Rage (2022)
- Daughter of Shanghai (1937)
- Daughter of Sindbad (1958)
- Daughter of the Bride (2023)
- Daughter of the Dragon (1931)
- Daughter of the East (1924)
- Daughter of the Jungle: (1949 & 1982)
- Daughter of the Mind (1969 TV)
- Daughter of the Night (1920)
- Daughter of the Nile (1987)
- Daughter of the Party (1958)
- Daughter of the Regiment: (1929, 1933 & 1953)
- Daughter of the Sea: (1917 & 1953)
- Daughter of the Sun: (1962 & 2023)
- Daughter of the Tong (1939)
- Daughter of the West (1949)
- Daughter of the Wolf (2019)
- Daughter's Daughter (2024)
- Daughters (2024)
- Daughters Courageous (1939)
- Daughters, Daughters (1973)
- Daughters Who Pay (1925)
- Daughters, Wives and a Mother (1960)
- Daughters of Chibok (2019)
- Daughters of Darkness (1971)
- Daughters of Mother India (2014)
- Daughters of Pharmacist Kim (1963)
- Daughters of the Dust (1991)
- Daughters of the Sun (2000)

==== Dav–Daw ====
- Dav Bakdong Meas (1972)
- Dave (1993)
- Dave Brubeck: In His Own Sweet Way (2010) (TV)
- Dave Chappelle's Block Party (2006)
- Dave Made a Maze (2017)
- Daveed (2025)
- David: (1951, 1979, 1988 TV, 1997 TV, 2013 Hindi, 2013 Tamil, 2020 & 2025)
- David Attenborough: A Life on Our Planet (2020)
- David and Bathsheba (1951)
- David & Fatima (2008)
- David & Goliath (2013)
- David Holzman's Diary (1967)
- David & Layla (2005)
- David and Lisa (1963)
- David Lynch: The Art Life (2016)
- David's Birthday (2009)
- David's Mother (1994)
- Davy Crockett: (1910 & 1916)
- Davy Crockett: King of the Wild Frontier (1955)
- Dawg (2002)
- Dawg Fight (2015)
- Dawlat (1949)
- Dawn (1928)
- Dawn (1929)
- Dawn (1985)
- Dawn (2014)
- Dawn (2015)
- Dawn! (1979)
- Dawn Break Up (2015)
- Dawn Breaks Behind the Eyes (2021)
- Dawn Breaks, Which Is No Small Thing (1989)
- Dawn of the Dead: (1978 & 2004)
- Dawn, Her Dad and the Tractor (2021)
- Dawn Over the Drava (1974)
- Dawn Patrol (2014)
- The Dawn Patrol: (1930 & 1938)
- Dawn of the Planet of the Apes (2014)
- Dawn: Portrait of a Teenage Runaway (1976)
- Dawn Rider (2012)
- The Dawn Rider (1935)
- The Dawns Here Are Quiet: (1972 & 2015)
- Dawshom Awbotaar (2023)
- Dawson City: Frozen Time (2016)
- Dawson Isla 10 (2009)

==== Day–Daz ====
- The Day After: (1909 & 2017)
- The Day After Tomorrow (2004)
- Day of the Animals (1977)
- A Day at the Beach (1970)
- The Day of the Beast (1995)
- A Day in the Country (1936)
- Day of the Dead (1985 & 2008)
- Day of the Dead 2: Contagium (2005)
- The Day of the Dolphin (1974)
- Day Dreams: (1919 & 1922)
- Day Drinker (2027)
- The Day the Earth Blew Up: A Looney Tunes Movie (2024)
- The Day the Earth Caught Fire (1962)
- The Day the Earth Froze (1959)
- The Day the Earth Stood Still (1951 & 2008)
- Day of the Fight (1951)
- The Day I Became a Woman (2000)
- The Day of the Jackal (1973)
- A Day of Judgment (1981)
- The Day of the Locust (1975)
- Day and Night: (1997, 2004 Chinese, 2004 Swedish & 2010)
- Day for Night (1973)
- Day One: (1989 & 2015)
- Day of the Outlaw (1959)
- The Day a Pig Fell into the Well (1996)
- A Day at the Races (1937)
- Day of Reckoning: (1933, 2016, & 2025)
- Day Shift (2022)
- The Day the Sky Exploded (1958)
- The Day That Shook the World (1975)
- The Day Time Ended (1980)
- The Day of the Triffids (1963)
- Day Watch (2006)
- The Day Will Dawn (1942)
- A Day Without a Mexican (2004)
- Day the World Ended (1955)
- Day of Wrath (1943)
- A Day's Pleasure (1919)
- Daybreak: (1918, 1931, 1933, 1948, 1993, 2008 & 2017)
- Daybreakers (2009)
- Daydream: (1964 & 1981)
- The Daydreamer (1966)
- Daydreams (1915)
- Daylight: (1996 & 2013)
- Days (2020)
- The Days: (1993 & 2006)
- Days of '36 (1972)
- Days of the Bagnold Summer (2019)
- Days of Being Wild (1991)
- Days of Heaven (1978)
- Days of Our Own (2016)
- Days of Thunder (1990)
- Days of Wine and Roses (1962)
- Days of Youth (1929)
- The Daytrippers (1997)
- Dazed and Confused (1993)

=== De ===
- De Corpo e Alma (2010)
- De Dana Dan (2009)
- De De Pyaar De (2019)
- De De Pyaar De 2 (2025)
- De Dhakka (2008)
- De Dhakka 2 (2023)
- De Gaulle (2020)
- De Ingottu Nokkiye (2008)
- De México llegó el amor (1940)
- De Palma (2015)
- De Schippers van de Kameleon (2003)
- De-Lovely (2004)

==== Dea ====
- The Dead: (1987 & 2010)
- Dead & Breakfast (2004)
- Dead & Buried (1981)
- Dead Again (1991)
- Dead or Alive: (1921, 1944, 1999 & 2006)
- The Dead Are Alive (1972)
- Dead Bang (1989)
- Dead Before Dawn 3D (2012)
- Dead Birds: (1963 & 2004)
- Dead Calm (1989)
- Dead Cert: (1974 & 2010)
- Dead for a Dollar (2022)
- The Dead Don't Die: (1975 TV & 2019)
- Dead End: (1937 & 2003)
- The Dead Eyes of London (1961)
- The Dead Father (1985)
- Dead Friend (2004)
- The Dead Girl (2006)
- The Dead Hate the Living! (2001)
- Dead in a Heartbeat (2002) (TV)
- Dead Heat: (1988 & 2002)
- Dead Heat on a Merry-Go-Round (1966)
- Dead Man (1995)
- Dead Man on Campus (1998)
- Dead Man Down (2013)
- Dead Man Walking (1995)
- Dead Man's Eyes (1944)
- Dead Man's Letters (1986)
- Dead Man's Shoes: (1940 & 2004)
- Dead Men Don't Wear Plaid (1982)
- Dead Mountaineer's Hotel (1979)
- Dead of Night (1946)
- The Dead One (1961)
- Dead Pigeon on Beethoven Street (1972)
- Dead Pigs (2018)
- Dead Poets Society (1989)
- The Dead Pool (1988)
- Dead Presidents (1995)
- Dead Reckoning (1947)
- Dead Right (1993)
- Dead Ringer (1964)
- Dead Ringers (1988)
- Dead Rising: Watchtower (2015)
- The Dead Room: (2015 & 2018 TV)
- Dead Silence (2007)
- Dead Snow (2009)
- Dead Solid Perfect (1988)
- Dead Time: Kala (2007)
- Dead in the Water: (1991 TV & 2002)
- Dead in a Week or Your Money Back (2018)
- Dead of Winter: (1987 & 2025)
- The Dead Zone (1983)
- Deadbeat at Dawn (1988)
- Deadfall: (1968, 1993 & 2012)
- Deadful Melody (1994)
- Deadgirl (2008)
- Deadlier Than the Male (1966)
- The Deadliest Season (1977) (TV)
- Deadline: (1948, 1980, 1987, 2001, 2009 & 2012)
- Deadline - U.S.A. (1952)
- Deadline at Dawn (1946)
- A Deadly Adoption (2015) (TV)
- The Deadly Affair (1966)
- The Deadly Bees (1966)
- Deadly Blessing (1981)
- The Deadly Companions (1961)
- Deadly Drifter (1982)
- Deadly Eyes (1982)
- Deadly Friend (1986)
- Deadly Games (1989)
- Deadly Harvest: (1972 TV & 1977)
- Deadly Illusions (2021)
- The Deadly Mantis: (1957 & 1978)
- A Deadly Secret (1980)
- The Deadly Spawn (1983)
- Deadly Strangers (1974)
- The Deadly Tower (1975) (TV)
- Deadpool series:
  - Deadpool (2016)
  - Deadpool 2 (2018)
  - Deadpool & Wolverine (2024)
- Deadstream (2022)
- Deadtime Stories (1986)
- Deadwood: The Movie (2019) (TV)
- Deaf Smith & Johnny Ears (1973)
- Deal (2008)
- The Deal: (1983, 2003 TV, 2005, 2008 & 2015)
- Deal of the Century (1983)
- Dear America: Letters Home from Vietnam (1987)
- Dear Brigitte (1965)
- Dear Comrades! (2020)
- Dear Diary (1993)
- Dear Doctor (2009)
- Dear Enemy (2011)
- Dear Evan Hansen (2021)
- Dear Frankie (2004)
- Dear God (1996)
- Dear Jesse (1998)
- Dear John: (1964 & 2010)
- Dear Mr. Brody (2021)
- Dear Murderer (1947)
- Dear Wendy (2005)
- Dear White People (2014)
- Dear Zachary: A Letter to a Son About His Father (2008)
- Dear, Don't Be Afraid (2015)
- Dearest Sister (2016)
- Death to 2020 (2020)
- Death to 2021 (2021)
- Death Becomes Her (1992)
- Death Bed: The Bed That Eats (1977)
- Death Bell (2008)
- Death in Brunswick (1990)
- The Death Collector (1976)
- Death and the Compass (1996)
- Death of a Corrupt Man (1977)
- Death of a Cyclist (1955)
- Death Defying Acts (2007)
- Death from a Distance (1935)
- Death Duel (1977)
- Death of a Dynasty (2003)
- Death Force (1978)
- Death at a Funeral: (2007 & 2010)
- Death Game (1977)
- Death in the Garden (1956)
- Death in Gaza (2004)
- Death Hunt: (1977 & 1981)
- Death Knocks Twice (1969)
- Death of a Ladies' Man (2020)
- Death Line (1972)
- The Death of Louis XIV (2016)
- Death Machine (1994)
- Death and the Maiden (1995)
- Death of Me (2020)
- The Death of Mr. Lazarescu (2005)
- Death of a Nation: (1994 & 2018)
- Death on the Nile: (1978 & 2022)
- The Death Note (2016)
- Death Note series:
  - Death Note: (2006 & 2017)
  - Death Note 2: The Last Name (2006)
  - L: Change the World (2008)
  - Death Note: Light Up the New World (2016)
- Death of a Poetess (2017)
- Death of a President: (1977 & 2006)
- Death Proof (2007)
- Death Race: (1973 TV & 2008)
- Death Race 2 (2011)
- Death Race 2000 (1975)
- Death Rides a Horse (1967)
- Death Ring (1992)
- The Death of Robin Hood (2026)
- Death of a Salesman: (1951 & 1985)
- Death of a Scoundrel (1956)
- Death Sentence: (1968, 1974 & 2007)
- Death Ship (1980)
- The Death Ship (1959)
- Death to Smoochy (2002)
- The Death of Snow White (2025)
- Death of a Soldier (1986)
- Death Spa (1989)
- The Death of Stalin (2017)
- The Death of Superman (2018)
- Death to the Supermodels (2005)
- Death Takes a Holiday: (1934 & 1971 TV)
- Death Trip: (1967, 2014 & 2015)
- Death Tunnel (2005)
- Death of a Unicorn (2025)
- Death in Venice (1971)
- Death of a Vlogger (2019)
- Death Watch (1980)
- The Death Wheelers (1974)
- Death Wish series:
  - Death Wish: (1974 & 2018)
  - Death Wish II (1982)
  - Death Wish 3 (1985)
  - Death Wish 4: The Crackdown (1987)
  - Death Wish V: The Face of Death (1994)
- Death, Deceit and Destiny Aboard the Orient Express (2000)
- The Deathday Party (2014)
- Deathdream (1974)
- Deathlands: Homeward Bound (2003)
- Deathrow (2000)
- The Deaths of Ian Stone (2007)
- Deathstalker: (1984 & 2025)
- Deathstalker and the Warriors from Hell (1988)
- Deathtrap (1982)
- Deathwatch: (1965 & 2002)

==== Deb–Ded ====
- Deb and Sisi (2008)
- Debatik (1991)
- Debbie (1965)
- Debbie Does Dallas (1978)
- Debbie Does Dallas... Again (2007)
- Debi: (2005 & 2018)
- Debipaksha (2004)
- Debit and Credit (1924)
- Debosyon (2013)
- The Deb (2024)
- The Debt: (1917, 1993, 1997, 1999, 2003 TV, 2007, 2010, 2014 & 2015)
- Debt of Honour (1936)
- A Debt of Honour: (1921 & 1922)
- Deburau (1951)
- Debug (2014)
- Debunkers, Inc. (2019)
- Debut (2017)
- Decadence (1994)
- Decadent Evil (2005)
- The Decameron (1971)
- Decay: (2012 & 2015)
- Decaying Orbit (2007)
- Deccan Queen (1936)
- Deceit: (1923, 1932, 1952, 1989, 1999, 2004 TV & 2009)
- Deceived (1991)
- Deceived by Trust (1995 TV)
- Deceiver (1997)
- The Deceiver (1931)
- The Deceivers (1988)
- December: (1988, 2008 & 2022)
- December 7th (1943)
- December Boys (2007)
- December Bride (1990)
- December Flower (1984 TV)
- December Heat (2008)
- December Pookkal (1986)
- Decent Parties (2009)
- Deception: (1932, 1946, 2003, 2008 & 2021)
- Deception Obsession (2015)
- Deception: Oo Pel Dan Myin (2018)
- Deceptions (1990)
- Deceptions II: Edge of Deception (1995)
- Deceptive Practice: The Mysteries and Mentors of Ricky Jay (2012)
- Decibel (2022)
- Deciding Vote (2023)
- Decision Before Dawn (1951)
- Decision to Leave (2022)
- Decision at Midnight (1963)
- Decision at Sundown (1957)
- Decisions! Decisions! (1971 TV)
- Decisive Engagement: The Liaoxi-Shenyang Campaign (1991)
- Deck 5B (2024)
- Deck Dogz (2005)
- Deck the Halls (2006)
- Declaration of War (2011)
- Declarations of Love (1994)
- The Decline (2020)
- The Decline of the American Empire (1986)
- Decline of an Empire (2014)
- Decline and Fall... of a Birdwatcher (1968)
- Decoded (2024)
- Decoder (1984)
- Decoding Annie Parker (2013)
- Decoding COVID-19 (2020 TV)
- Decoding Deepak (2012)
- Deconstructing Harry (1997)
- Decoration Day (1990 TV)
- Decoy: (1934, 1946 & 1995)
- Decoys (2004)
- Decoys 2: Alien Seduction (2007)
- Deda (2025)
- Dede (2017)
- Dedh Bigha Zameen (2024)
- Dedh Lakh Ka Dulha (2022)
- Dedicated to My Ex (2019)
- Dedication (2006)
- Deduce, You Say! (1956)

==== Dee ====
- Deed Poll (2004)
- Deedar: (1951 & 1992)
- Deedar-E-Yaar (1982)
- Deeksha (1974)
- Deemak (2025)
- Deemo: Memorial Keys (2021)
- Deenamma Jeevitham (2024)
- Deep: (2005, 2017 & 2021)
- The Deep: (1977, 2012 & unfinished)
- Deep Blood (1989)
- Deep Blue (2003)
- Deep Blue Sea series:
  - Deep Blue Sea (1999)
  - Deep Blue Sea 2 (2018)
  - Deep Blue Sea 3 (2020)
- The Deep Blue Sea: (1955 & 2011)
- Deep Breath (2003)
- Deep Core (2000)
- Deep Cover: (1992 & 2025)
- Deep Crimson (1996)
- Deep Dark Canyon (2012)
- Deep Down (1994)
- Deep End (1970)
- The Deep End (2001)
- The Deep End of the Ocean (1999)
- Deep Evil (2004)
- Deep Family Secrets (1997 TV)
- Deep Freeze (2001)
- Deep Fridge (2025)
- Deep Gold (2011)
- Deep Hearts (1980)
- The Deep House (2021)
- Deep Impact (1998)
- Deep Inside Clint Star (1999 TV)
- Deep Jweley Jaai (1959)
- Deep Murder (2018)
- Deep Nebhe Nai (1970)
- The Deep Ones (2020)
- Deep Powder (2013)
- Deep Red: (1976 & 1994)
- Deep Rising (1998)
- Deep River (1995)
- Deep Sea (2023)
- Deep Sea 3D (2006)
- Deep Sea Beast Reigo (2005)
- Deep Shock (2003) (TV)
- Deep Sky (2023)
- Deep Soul (2009)
- Deep South (1937)
- Deep Space (1988)
- Deep Throat (1972)
- Deep Throat in Tokyo (1975)
- Deep Time (2011)
- Deep Trap (2015)
- Deep Valley (1947)
- Deep Water: (2006, 2022 & 2026)
- Deep Waters: (1920 & 1948)
- Deep Web (2015)
- Deep Winter (1985)
- Deep in the Woods (2000)
- Deepa & Rupa: A Fairy Tale from India (1990)
- Deepam (1980)
- Deepasthambham Mahascharyam (1999)
- Deepavali: (1960, 2000, 2007 & 2008)
- Deepavali Bonus (2024)
- Deeper! (2020)
- Deeper and Deeper (2010)
- Deepsouth (2012)
- DeepStar Six (1989)
- Deepwater (2005)
- Deepwater Horizon (2016)
- The Deer (1974)
- Deer Friend (1991)
- The Deer Hunter (1978)
- Deergha Sumangali (1995)
- Deergha Sumangali Bhava (1998)
- Deerskin (2019)
- Derslayer (1943)
- Deevinchandi (2001)
- Deewaanapan (2001)
- Deewaangee (1976)
- Deewaar (1975)
- Deewaar: Let's Bring Our Heroes Home (2004)
- Deewana: (1992 & 2013)
- Deewane (2000)
- Deewane Huye Paagal (2005)
- Deewane Tere Pyar Ke (1998)
- Deewangee (2002)

==== Def–Dej ====
- Def Jam's How to Be a Player (1997)
- Def by Temptation (1990)
- Def-Con 4 (1985)
- Defamation (2009)
- Default: (2014 & 2018)
- Defeat of the Mafia (1970)
- Defence of Sevastopol (1911)
- Defendant, Stand Up! (1939)
- Defending Your Life (1991)
- Defendor (2010)
- Defiance: (1952, 1980 & 2008)
- Defiance of a Teenager (1959)
- Defiant: (2023 & 2025)
- The Defiant Ones: (1958 & 1986 TV)
- Defining Moments (2021)
- Definitely, Maybe (2008)
- Definition of Fear (2015)
- Defund (2021)
- Defy Gravity (1990)
- Defying Destiny (1923)
- Defying Gravity: (1997 & 2008)
- Defying the Law (1924)
- Defying the Nazis: The Sharps' War (2016 TV)
- Degania: The First Kibbutz Fights Its Last Battle (2008)
- Degenerate Art (2012)
- Degrassi Goes Hollywood (2009 TV)
- Degrassi Takes Manhattan (2010 TV)
- Degrassi: Whatever It Takes (2025)
- Degree Maila: MA 3rd Class (2024)
- Degree of Murder (1967)
- Degree of Risk (1968)
- Dehati Disco (2022)
- Dehleez (1983)
- Del svarte hestane (1951)
- Deidra & Laney Rob a Train (2017)
- Deilig er fjorden! (1985)
- Deiva Balam (1959)
- Deiva Cheyal (1967)
- Deiva Kuzhandhaigal (1973)
- Deiva Machan (2023)
- Deiva Magan (1969)
- Deiva Thai (1964)
- Deiva Thirumagal (2011)
- Deiva Vaakku (1992)
- Deivam (1972)
- Deivame Thunai (1959)
- Deivamsam (1973)
- Deivapiravi: (1960 & 1985)
- Deivathin Deivam (1962)
- Deiveega Raagangal (1980)
- Deiveega Uravu (1968)
- Déjà Vu (1985, 1990, 1997, 2006 & 2015)
- Dejavu (2022)

==== Dek ====
- Dekada '70 (2002)
- Dekala Purudu Kenek (2019)
- DeKalb Elementary (2017)
- Dekalog (1988)
- Dekh Bhai Dekh (2009)
- Dekh Indian Circus (2011)
- Dekh Kabira Roya (1957)
- Dekh Kemon Lage (2017)
- Dekh Magar Pyaar Say (2015)
- Dekh Tamasha Dekh (2014)
- Dekha (2001)
- Dekha Hela Prema Hela (2019)
- Dekha, Na-Dekhay (2013)
- Dekha Pyar Tumhara (1985)

==== Del ====
- Del cuplé al tango (1958)
- Del otro lado del puente (1980)
- Del rancho a la capital (1942)
- Del rancho a la televisión (1953)
- Del rosa al amarillo (1963)
- Delayed Action (1954)
- Delayed Flight (1964)
- Deldadeh (2008)
- Delete History (2020)
- Delete My Love (2014)
- Deleted (2022)
- Delgo (2006)
- Delhi-6 (2009)
- Delhi Belly (2011)
- Delhi in a Day (2011)
- Delhi Mapillai (1968)
- Delhi Mellei (2014)
- Delhii Heights (2007)
- Deli Yürek: Bumerang Cehennemi (2001)
- Delia's Gone (2022)
- Delicacy (2011)
- The Delicate Delinquent (1957)
- Delicate Gravity (2013)
- Delicate Sound of Thunder (1989)
- Delicatessen: (1930 & 1991)
- Deliciosa sinvergüenza (1990)
- Delicious: (1931, 2021 & 2025)
- The Delicious Little Devil (1919)
- Deliciously Amoral (1969)
- Delight of My Eyes (1954)
- Delighted (2016)
- Delighted by You (1958)
- Delightful Dolly (1910)
- Delightful Forest (1972)
- Delightful Story (1936)
- Delightfully Dangerous (1945)
- Delinquent Daughters (1944)
- Delinquent Parents (1938)
- The Delinquents: (1957, 1960 & 1989)
- Delirio: (1944 & 2024)
- Delirious: (1991 & 2006)
- Delirium: (1972, 1979, 1987, 2013, 2014 & 2018)
- Delirium in a Studio (1907)
- Delito (1962)
- Delitti e profumi (1988)
- Delitto a Porta Romana (1980)
- Delitto al luna park (1952)
- Delitto carnale (1983)
- Delitto passionale (1994)
- Delitto sull'autostrada (1982)
- Deliver Me (2006)
- Deliver Us (2023)
- Deliver Us from Eva (2003)
- Deliver Us from Evil: (1969, 1973 TV, 2006, 2009, 2014 & 2020)
- Deliverance (1919 & 1972)
- The Deliverance (2024)
- Deliverance Creek (2014 TV)
- Delivered (1999)
- Delivering (1993)
- Delivering Milo (2001)
- Delivery: (1976, 2005 & 2013)
- Delivery Boy (2024)
- Delivery Boys (1984)
- Delivery Man (2013)
- Delizia (1987)
- Della (1964)
- Dellamorte Dellamore (1994)
- Delphinium: A Childhood Portrait of Derek Jarman (2009)
- Delta Blues (2001)
- Delta Boys (2016)
- Delta Farce (2007)
- Delta Force series:
  - The Delta Force (1986)
  - Delta Force 2: The Colombian Connection (1990)
  - Delta Force 3: The Killing Game (1991)
- Delta Force Commando (1988)
- Delta Heat (1992)
- Delta of Venus (1994)
- Deluge (1933)
- The Deluge (1974)
- Delusion: (1955, 1980, 1991, 1998 & 2016)
- Delusions (2005)
- Delusion of Grandeur (1971)

==== Dem–Dep ====
- Demain à Nanguila (1969)
- Demented (1980)
- Demented Death Farm Massacre (1971)
- Dementia: (1955 & 2014)
- Dementia 13: (1963 & 2017)
- Demetrius and the Gladiators (1954)
- Demi Cinta Belahlah Dadaku (1991)
- Demi-Gods and Semi-Devils (1982)
- The Demi-Paradise (1943)
- Demi Ucok (2013)
- Demolishing and Building Up the Star Theatre (1901)
- Demolition High (1996)
- Demolition Man (1993)
- The Demon: (1918, 1926, 1978 & 1981)
- Demon Island (2002)
- Demon Knight (1995)
- Demon Seed (1977)
- Demon Slayer: Kimetsu no Yaiba – The Movie: Mugen Train (2020)
- Demon Under Glass (2002)
- Demonia (1990)
- Demonic Toys (1993)
- Demonic Toys 2 (2010)
- Demonlover (2002)
- Demons (1985)
- Demons 2 (1986)
- The Demons of Ludlow (1983)
- Den (2001)
- The Den (2013)
- Den Brother (2010)
- Den of Thieves (2018)
- Den of Thieves 2: Pantera (2025)
- Denial: (1990, 1998 & 2016)
- Denise Calls Up (1995)
- Denko (1993)
- Dennis the Menace (1993)
- Dennis the Menace Strikes Again (1998)
- The Dentist (1996)
- The Dentist 2: Brace Yourself (1998)
- Dentist in the Chair (1960)
- Dentist on the Job (1961)
- Deool (2011)
- Deool Band (2015)
- Deool Band 2 (2026)
- The Departed (2006)
- The Departure: (1967 & 2017)
- Departure: (1931 & 1986)
- Departure of a Grand Old Man (1912)
- Departures: (2008 & 2011)
- Deported (1950)

==== Der ====
- Derailed (2002, 2005 & 2016)
- Derailments (2011)
- Derailroaded: Inside the Mind of Wild Man Fischer (2005)
- Deranged: (1974, 1987 & 2012)
- Derby: (1926, 1949 & 1971)
- The Derby: (1895 & 1919)
- Derby Day: (1923 & 1952)
- The Derby Stallion (2005)
- The Derby Winner (1915)
- Derek (2008)
- Derek and Clive Get the Horn (1979)
- Derelict (1930)
- Derelicts (1917)
- Dereza (1985)
- Derivative (2005)
- Le Dernier Combat (1984)
- le Dernier cri (20060
- Le Dernier Diamant (2014)
- Le Dernier des fous (2006)
- Derrida (2002)
- Dersu Uzala: (1961 & 1975)
- The Deruga Case (1938)

==== Des ====
- Descendants series:
  - Descendants (2015 TV)
  - Descendants 2 (2017 TV)
  - Descendants 3 (2019 TV)
  - Descendants: The Rise of Red (2024)
  - Descendants: Wicked Wonderland (2026 TV)
- The Descendants (2011)
- Descent: (2005 TV & 2007)
- The Descent (2005)
- The Descent: Part 2 (2009)
- Desecration (1999)
- Desert Blue (1998)
- The Desert Fox: The Story of Rommel (1951)
- Desert Fury (1947)
- The Desert Island (1936)
- The Desert Rats (1953)
- The Desert Song: (1929, 1943 & 1953)
- Desierto (2015)
- Design for Living (1933)
- The Designated Victim (1971)
- Designing Woman (1957)
- Designing Women (1934)
- Desire: (1920, 1921, 1923, 1936, 1946, 1958, 1982, 2000 & 2017)
- The Desire: (1944 & 2010)
- Desire Me (1947)
- The Desired Woman (1927)
- Désirée (1954)
- Desk Set (1957)
- Desperado (1995)
- The Desperadoes (1943)
- The Desperados Are in Town (1956)
- Desperate (1947)
- Desperate Characters (1971)
- Desperate Hours (1990)
- The Desperate Hours: (1955 & 1967 TV)
- Desperate Journey (1942)
- Desperate Justice (1993 TV)
- Desperate Lives (1982 TV)
- Desperate Living (1977)
- Desperate for Love (1989 TV)
- Desperate Measures (1998)
- Desperate Mission (1965)
- The Desperate Mission (1969)
- Desperate Moment (1953)
- Desperate Poaching Affray (1903)
- Desperate Remedies (1993)
- Desperate Rescue: The Cathy Mahone Story (1993 TV)
- Desperate Search (1952)
- Desperate Teenage Lovedolls (1984)
- The Desperate Trail (1994 TV)
- Desperate Trails: (1921 & 1939)
- Desperately Seeking Helen (1998)
- Desperately Seeking Santa (2011 TV)
- Desperately Seeking Susan (1985)
- Desperation Boulevard (1998)
- Despicable Me series:
  - Despicable Me (2010)
  - Despicable Me 2 (2013)
  - Despicable Me 3 (2017)
  - Despicable Me 4 (2024)
- Despite the Falling Snow (2016)
- Despite the Night (2015)
- Despoinis eton 39 (1954)
- Después del silencio (1956)
- Desserts (1998)
- Destination 60,000 (1957)
- Destination Anywhere (1997)
- Destination: Dewsbury (2018)
- Destination: Infestation (2007 TV)
- Destination Inner Space (1966)
- Destination Moon (1950)
- Destination Tokyo (1943)
- Destination Wedding (2018)
- Destino (2003)
- Destiny: (1921, 1942, 1944, 1977, 1997 & 2006)
- Destiny: Or, The Soul of a Woman (1915)
- Destroy All Monsters (1968)
- Destry Rides Again (1939)
- Desyat Negrityat (1987)

==== Det–Dey ====
- Det andre skiftet (1978)
- Det æ'kke te å tru (1942)
- Det är aldrig för sent (1956)
- Det är långt till New York (1988)
- Det drønner gjennom dalen (1938)
- Det ender med bryllup (1943)
- Det gamle guld (1951)
- Det gælder os alle (1949)
- Det grodde fram (1947)
- Det kære legetøj (1968)
- Det kunne vært deg (1952)
- Det Means Girl (1995)
- Det perfekte mord (1992)
- Det Sande Ansigt (1951)
- Det skete på Møllegården (1960)
- Det stod i avisen (1962)
- Det store løb (1952)
- Det store varpet (1961)
- Det største spillet (1967)
- Det støver stadig (1962)
- Det var en gang (1994)
- Det var paa Rundetaarn (1955)
- The Detached Mission (1985)
- Detachment (2012)
- Details (2003)
- The Details (2011)
- Detained (1924)
- Detained (2024)
- Detainment (2018)
- Detective (1954)
- Detective (1958)
- Detective (1979)
- Detective (2007)
- Detective (2020)
- Détective (1985)
- The Detective: (1968 & 2007)
- The Detective 2 (2011)
- Detective 909 Keralathil (1970)
- Detective in the Bar (2011)
- Detective Belli (1969)
- Detective Bureau 2-3: Go to Hell Bastards! (1963)
- Detective Byomkesh Bakshy! (2015)
- Detective Chinatown series:
  - Detective Chinatown (2015)
  - Detective Chinatown 2 (2018)
  - Detective Chinatown 3 (2021)
  - Detective Chinatown 1900 (2025)
- Detective Conan series:
  - Detective Conan: The Time-Bombed Skyscraper (1997)
  - Detective Conan: The Fourteenth Target (1998)
  - Detective Conan: The Last Wizard of the Century (1999)
  - Detective Conan: Captured in Her Eyes (2000)
  - Detective Conan: Countdown to Heaven (2001)
  - Detective Conan: The Phantom of Baker Street (2002)
  - Detective Conan: Crossroad in the Ancient Capital (2003)
  - Detective Conan: Magician of the Silver Sky (2004)
  - Detective Conan: Strategy Above the Depths (2005)
  - Detective Conan: The Private Eyes' Requiem (2006)
  - Detective Conan: Jolly Roger in the Deep Azure (2007)
  - Detective Conan: Full Score of Fear (2008)
  - Detective Conan: The Raven Chaser (2009)
  - Detective Conan: The Lost Ship in the Sky (2010)
  - Detective Conan: Quarter of Silence (2011)
  - Detective Conan: The Eleventh Striker (2012)
  - Detective Conan: Private Eye in the Distant Sea (2013)
  - Detective Conan: Dimensional Sniper (2014)
  - Detective Conan: Sunflowers of Inferno (2015)
  - Detective Conan: The Darkest Nightmare (2016)
  - Detective Conan: The Crimson Love Letter (2017)
  - Detective Conan: Zero the Enforcer (2018)
  - Detective Conan: The Fist of Blue Sapphire (2019)
  - Detective Conan: The Scarlet Bullet (2021)
  - Detective Conan: The Bride of Halloween (2022)
  - Detective Conan: Black Iron Submarine (2023)
  - Detective Conan: The Million-dollar Pentagram (2024)
  - Detective Conan: One-eyed Flashback (2025)
  - Detective Conan: Fallen Angel of the Highway (2026)
- The Detective and Death (1994)
- Detective Dee: The Four Heavenly Kings (2018)
- Detective Dee and the Mystery of the Phantom Flame (2010)
- The Detective Goes the Wrong Way (1949)
- Detective Gui (2015)
- Detective K series:
  - Detective K: Secret of the Virtuous Widow (2011)
  - Detective K: Secret of the Lost Island (2015)
  - Detective K: Secret of the Living Dead (2018)
- Detective Kien: The Headless Horror (2025)
- Detective Kitty O'Day (1944)
- Detective Knight series:
  - Detective Knight: Rogue (2022)
  - Detective Knight: Redemption (2022)
  - Detective Knight: Independence (2023)
- Detective Lloyd (1931)
- Detective Naani (2009)
- Detective Narada (1992)
- Detective Pikachu (2019)
- Detective School Dropouts (1986)
- Detective Sherdil (2025)
- Detective vs Sleuths (2022)
- Detective Story: (1951, 1983 & 2007)
- Detective Ujjwalan (2025)
- Detective Willy (2015)
- The Detective's Stratagem (1913)
- Detectives (1928)
- Detectives (1969)
- Detectives on the Edge of a Nervous Breakdown (1993)
- Detectives o ladrones..? (1967)
- Detector (2000)
- Detention: (2003, 2010, 2011 & 2019)
- Detention of the Dead (2012)
- Determiantion (1922)
- Determinations (1987)
- Deterrence (1999)
- The Detonator (2006)
- Detour: (1945, 1967, 2009 Canadian, 2009 Norwegian, 2013, 2016 & 2021)
- Detouring America (1939)
- Detours (2016)
- Detours Ahead (2024)
- Detours to Happiness (1939)
- Detrans (2023)
- Detroit (2017)
- Detroit 9000 (1973)
- Detroit Rock City (1999)
- Deuce Bigalow: European Gigolo (2005)
- Deuce Bigalow: Male Gigolo (1999)
- Deuce High (1926)
- The Deuce of Spades (1922)
- Deuces (2017)
- Deuces Wild (2002)
- Deuda (2004)
- Deuljwi (1927)
- Deus (2022)
- Deuteronomium - Der Tag des jüngsten Gerichts (2004)
- Deux femmes sur la route (2007)
- Deux fois (1968)
- Deux heures moins le quart avant Jésus-Christ (1982)
- Le deuxième souffle (1966)
- Deuxième vie (2000)
- Dev: (2004 & 2019)
- Dev Son of Mudde Gowda (2012)
- Dev.D (2009)
- Deva: (1989, 1995, 2002 & 2017)
- Deva Maanava (1966)
- Deva Sundari (1957)
- Devaalayam (1964)
- Devaasuram (1993)
- Devadas: (1989 & 2018)
- Devdas: (1935, 1955, 2002 Hindi & 2002 Bengali)
- Devadasi (1948)
- Devadasu: (1953, 1974 & 2006)
- Devadasu Malli Puttadu (1978)
- Devadoothan (2000)
- Devakanya (1943)
- Devaki: (1951, 2005 & 2019)
- Devalokam (unreleased)
- Devan (2002)
- Devanthakudu: (1960 & 1984)
- Devar (1966)
- Devara Duddu (1977)
- Devara Gedda Manava (1967)
- Devara Gudi (1975)
- Devara Kannu (1975)
- Devara Maga (2000)
- Devara Makkalu (1970)
- Devara Naadalli (2016)
- Devaraagam (1996)
- Devarattam (2019)
- Devaraya (2012)
- Devaru Bekagiddare (2019)
- Devaru Kotta Thangi: (1973 & 2009)
- Devaru Kotta Vara (1976)
- Devasthanam (2012)
- Devasundari (1962)
- Devata: (1941, 1965 & 1978)
- Devatha: (1965 & 1982)
- Devatha Manushya (1988)
- Devathai (1997)
- Devathaiyai Kanden (2005)
- Devathalara Deevinchandi (1977)
- Devdas: (1928, 1935, 1936, 1937, 1955, 1965, 1979, 1982, 2002 Bengali, 2002 Hindi & 2013)
- Devdoot (2005)
- Developing (1994)
- Deveni Gamana (1982)
- Deveni Warama (2016)
- Devi: (1960, 1970, 1972, 1999, 2016 & 2020)
- Devi 2 (2019)
- Devi Dharisanam (1980)
- Devi Kanyakumari (1974)
- Devi Putrudu (2001)
- Deviant (2018)
- Deviant Love (2019)
- Deviation (2006)
- The Devil: (1908, 1915, 1918 & 1972)
- Devil: (2010 & 2011)
- The Devil All the Time (2020)
- Devil and Angel (2015)
- The Devil Bat (1940)
- Devil in a Blue Dress (1995)
- The Devil in a Convent (1899)
- The Devil and Daniel Johnston (2006)
- The Devil and Daniel Webster (1941)
- Devil Doll (1964)
- Devil Fish (1986)
- Devil in the Flesh (1947, 1986 & 1998)
- Devil in the Flesh 2 (2000)
- Devil Girl from Mars (1954)
- The Devil Inside (2012)
- The Devil in Love (1966)
- The Devil and Max Devlin (1981)
- Devil May Call (2013)
- The Devil and Miss Jones (1941)
- The Devil Probably (1977)
- Devil Riders (1943)
- The Devil Rides Out (1968)
- The Devil Strikes at Night (1957)
- The Devil by the Tail (1969)
- The Devil Thumbs a Ride (1947)
- The Devil Wears Prada (2006)
- The Devil Wears Prada 2 (2026)
- The Devil Is a Woman: (1935, 1950 & 1974)
- A Devil of a Woman (1951)
- The Devil-Doll (1936)
- The Devil's Advocate: (1977 & 1997)
- Devil's Angels (1967)
- The Devil's Backbone (2001)
- Devil's Bait (1959)
- The Devil's Brigade (1968)
- The Devil's Brother (1933)
- The Devil's Candy (2015)
- The Devil's Daughter: (1915, 1939, 1973 TV & 1991)
- Devil's Diary (2007 TV)
- Devil's Doorway (1950)
- The Devil's Double (2011)
- The Devil's Game (2008)
- Devil's Gate: (2004 & 2017)
- The Devil's General (1955)
- Devil’s Knot (2013)
- Devil's Night: Dawn of the Nain Rouge (2019)
- The Devil’s Mercy (2008)
- The Devil's Nightmare (1971)
- The Devil's Own (1997)
- The Devil's Party (1938)
- The Devil's Pass (2013)
- Devil's Playground: (2002 & 2010)
- The Devil's Playground: (1928, 1937, 1946 & 1976)
- Devil's Pond (2003)
- The Devil's Rain (1975)
- The Devil's Rejects (2005)
- The Devil's Tomb (2009)
- The Devil's Trail (1919)
- The Devil's Trap (1962)
- The Devil's Wheel (1926)
- A Devilish Homicide (1965)
- Devilman (2004)
- The Devils (1971)
- Devils on the Doorstep (2000)
- The Devonsville Terror (1983)
- Devotion: (1921, 1929, 1931, 1946, 1950, 1954 & 2022)
- Devour (2005)
- Dew (2019)
- Dewan Bahadur (1943)
- Dexter (2025)
- Dexter's Laboratory: Ego Trip (1999 TV)
- Deya Neya (1963)
- Deyaler Desh (2024)
- Deyyam: (1996 & 2021)

=== Dh ===
==== Dha ====
- Dha Dha 87 (2019)
- Dhaaak (2024)
- Dhaakad (2022)
- Dhaal (1997)
- Dhaam Dhoom (2008)
- Dhaasippen (1943)
- Dhada (2011)
- Dhadak (2018)
- Dhadak 2 (2025)
- Dhadakebaaz (1990)
- Dhadkan: (1946, 2000 & 2017)
- Dhag (2012)
- Dhai Aakhar (2023)
- Dhai Akshar Prem Ke (2000)
- Dhai Chaal (2023)
- Dhairyam: (2005 & 2017)
- Dhairyavanthudu (1986)
- Dhaka Attack (2017)
- Dhaka to Bombay (2013)
- Dhakaiya Mastan (2002)
- Dhakam (1972)
- Dhake Ki Malmal (1956)
- Dhakshina (2024)
- Dhalinyaro (2017)
- Dham (2003)
- Dhamaal series:
  - Dhamaal (2007)
  - Double Dhamaal (2011)
  - Total Dhamaal (2019)
- Dhamaka: (2020, 2021 & 2022)
- Dhamkee (1973)
- The Dhamma Brothers (2007)
- Dhan Daulat (1980)
- Dhan Dhana Dhan (2011)
- Dhanak (2015)
- Dhanalakshmi (1977)
- Dhanalakshmi, I Love You (2002)
- Dhanam: (1991 & 2008)
- Dhanama? Daivama? (1973)
- Dhananjay (2017)
- Dhanush (2003)
- Dhanusu Raasi Neyargale (2019)
- Dhanwan: (1937, 1946, 1981 & 1993)
- Dhanya (1981)
- Dhanyam (2012)
- Dhanyee Meye (1971)
- Dhappa (2019)
- Dharala Prabhu (2020)
- Dharam Kanta (1982)
- Dharam Karam (1975)
- Dharam Sankat (1991)
- Dharam Sankat Mein (2015)
- Dharam Veer (1977)
- Dharam Yudh Morcha (2016)
- Dharamyudh (1988)
- Dharani (2015)
- Dharani Mandala Madhyadolage: (1983 & 2022)
- Dharavi: (1992 & 2018)
- Dharini (2002)
- Dharinnahtakai (2004)
- Dharisanam (1970)
- Dharitri (1973)
- Dharkan (1972)
- Dharm (2007)
- Dharm Adhikari (1986)
- Dharm Aur Qanoon (1984)
- Dharma: (1973, 1998 & 2004)
- Dharma Bandhan (1940)
- Dharma Chakkaram (1997)
- Dharma Chakram (1996)
- Dharma Daata (1970)
- Dharmaa (2010)
- Dharmaveer (2022)
- Dharmaveer 2 (2024)
- Dharmayuddhaya (2017)
- Dharmayuddhaya 2 (2026)
- Dharmayudham (1973)
- Dharmputra (1961)
- Dharti: (1970 & 2011)
- Dharti Kahe Pukar Ke: (1969 & 2006)
- Dharti Ke Lal (1946)
- Dharti Mata (1938)
- Dhartiputra (1993)
- Dhauli Express (2007)
- Dhauvaa (1998)
- Dhauvath (2019)
- Dhavanik Kanavugal (1984)
- Dhawala Pushpaya (1994)
- Dhaya (2002)
- Dhayam (2017)

==== Dhe–Dhy ====
- Dhee (2007)
- Dheem Tharikida Thom (1986)
- Dheeme Dheeme (2009)
- Dheena (2001)
- Dheepam (1977)
- Dheepan (2015)
- Dheera (1982)
- Dheeran (1987)
- Dheerasameere Yamuna Theere (1977)
- Dheerga Sumangali (1974)
- Dheevaanaa (2001)
- Dheewarayo (1964)
- Dheewari (2011)
- Dhefirin (1997)
- Dhehithehge Loabi (1995)
- Dheivatheyorthu (1985)
- Dheriyaa (1994)
- Dhevana An'bi (1994)
- Dhevansoora (2018)
- Dhh (2017)
- Dhikku Theriyadha Kaattil (1972)
- Dhilakani (2013)
- Dhill (2001)
- Dhilluku Dhuddu (2016)
- Dhilluku Dhuddu 2 (2019)
- Dhin Veynuge Hithaamaigaa (2010)
- Dhinamdhorum (1998)
- Dhinamum Ennai Gavani (1997)
- Dhinarathrangal (1988)
- Dhobi Doctor (1954)
- Dhobi Ghat (2010)
- Dhol (2007)
- Dhol Taashe (2015)
- Dhon Manma (1992)
- Dhoni (2012)
- Dhoni Kabadi Kuzhu (2018)
- Dhonkamana (2003)
- Dhool: (2003 & 2011)
- Dhool Ka Phool (1959)
- Dhool Parakuthu (1993)
- Dhoom series:
  - Dhoom (2004)
  - Dhoom 2 (2006)
  - Dhoom 3 (2013)
- Dhoom Dadakka (2008)
- Dhoom Dhadaka (1985)
- Dhoomakethu (1968)
- Dhoomketu (1949)
- Dhoon (1953)
- Dhoondte Reh Jaaoge (2009)
- Dhoondte Reh Jaaoge! (1998)
- Dhoop (2003)
- Dhoop Chhaon: (1935 & 1977)
- Dhoorathu Pachai (1987)
- Dhosth (2001)
- Dhrohi (1982)
- Dhruva: (2002 & 2016)
- Dhruvam (1993)
- Dhruvasangamam (1981)
- Dhuan (1981)
- Dhuandhaar (2021)
- Dhuen Ki Lakeer (1974)
- Dhuin (2022)
- Dhumah Eri Thari (2001)
- Dhumketu (2016)
- Dhumkkudiya (2019)
- Dhumm (2002)
- Dhund: (1973 & 2003)
- Dhunki (2019)
- Dhurala (2020)
- Dhuusar (2020)
- Dhwani (1988)
- Dhwaja (2018)
- Dhyaas Parva (2001)

=== Di ===
==== Dia–Dik ====
- The Diabolic Tenant (1909)
- Diabolique (1996)
- Les Diaboliques (1955)
- Dial M for Murder (1954)
- The Diamond (1954)
- Diamond Men (2000)
- The Diamond Necklace (1921)
- Diamonds: (1920, 1937, 1939, 1947, 1975 & 1999)
- Diamonds Are Forever (1971)
- Diamonds of the Night (1964)
- Diane: (1929, 1956 & 2018)
- Diao Chan (1938)
- Diary: (1983, 1997 & 2006)
- The Diary of Anne Frank: (1959, 1967 TV & 1980 TV)
- Diary of a Chambermaid: (1964 & 2015)
- The Diary of a Chambermaid (1946)
- Diary of a Country Priest (1951)
- Diary of the Dead (2007)
- Diary of June (2005)
- Diary of a Lost Girl (1929)
- Diary of a Mad Black Woman (2005)
- Diary of a Mad Housewife (1970)
- Diary of a Madman (1963)
- Diary for My Children (1984)
- Diary for My Lovers (1987)
- Diary for My Mother and Father (1990)
- Diary of a Nymphomaniac (2008)
- A Diary for Timothy (1945)
- The Diary of a Teenage Girl (2015)
- Diary of a Wimpy Kid series:
  - Diary of a Wimpy Kid: (2010 & 2021)
  - Diary of a Wimpy Kid: Rodrick Rules: (2011 & 2022)
  - Diary of a Wimpy Kid: Dog Days (2012)
  - Diary of a Wimpy Kid: The Long Haul (2017)
  - Diary of a Wimpy Kid Christmas: Cabin Fever (2023)
- Dibu 3 (2002)
- Dice of Destiny (1920)
- Dice Rules (1991)
- Dicen que soy mujeriego (1949)
- Dick (1999)
- Dick Barton at Bay (1950)
- Dick Barton: Special Agent (1948)
- Dick Barton Strikes Back (1949)
- Dick Figures: The Movie (2013)
- Dick Johnson Is Dead (2020)
- Dick Tracy: (1945 & 1990)
- Dick Tracy vs. Cueball (1946)
- Dick Tracy Meets Gruesome (1947)
- Dick Tracy's Dilemma (1947)
- Dick Turpin: (1925, 1933 & 1974)
- Dick Turpin's Ride (1951)
- Dick Turpin's Ride to York (1922)
- Dickie Roberts: Former Child Star (2003)
- The Dickson Experimental Sound Film (1894)
- Dickson Greeting (1891)
- Dictator (2016)
- The Dictator (1935 & 2012)
- Dictionary (2021)
- Did a Good Man Die? (1962)
- Did We Meet Somewhere Before (1954)
- Did You Fall in Love Along the Beautiful Rhine? (1927)
- Did You Hear About the Morgans? (2009)
- Did You Hear the One About the Traveling Saleslady? (1968)
- Didgori: Land of Sacrificed Knights (2009)
- Dìdi (2024)
- Didi's Dream (2017)
- Didier (1997)
- Die (2010)
- Die Another Day (2002)
- Die Bad (2000)
- Die Hard series:
  - Die Hard (1988)
  - Die Hard 2 (1990)
  - Die Hard with a Vengeance (1995)
  - Live Free or Die Hard (2007)
  - A Good Day to Die Hard (2013)
- Die Laughing (1980)
- Die, Mommie, Die! (2003)
- Die, Monster, Die! (1965)
- Die My Love (2025)
- Die You Zombie Bastards! (2005)
- Dieci canzoni d'amore da salvare (1953)
- Died Suddenly (2022)
- Died Young, Stayed Pretty (2008)
- Dieu est grand, je suis toute petite (2001)
- Diego Corrientes: (1914, 1924, 1937 & 1959)
- Diego Maradona (2019)
- Dien Bien Phu (1992)
- Diesel (1942)
- Diet for a New America (1991)
- Diez canciones de Gardel (1931)
- Different Drummers (2013)
- Different Fortunes (1956)
- Different for Girls (1996)
- A Different Man (2024)
- Different Morals (1931)
- Different from the Others (1919)
- Different Strokes (1998)
- Different from Whom? (2009)
- Different from You and Me (1957)
- Difficult Years (1948)
- Difret (2014)
- Dig (2022)
- Dig! (2004)
- The Dig (2021)
- Dig Comics (2009)
- Dig That Uranium (1956)
- Dig Two Graves (2014)
- Dig Your Grave Friend... Sabata's Coming (1971)
- Diggajaru (2001)
- Digger: (1993, 2020 & 2026)
- Diggers: (1931 & 2006)
- Diggers in Blighty (1933)
- Digging to China (1997)
- Digging for Fire (2015)
- Digging Up the Marrow (2014)
- Diggstown (1992)
- "DigitalLivesMatter" (2016)
- Digimon: The Movie (2000)
- Digna... hasta el último aliento (2003)
- Dika: Murder City (1995)
- Dikkulu Choodaku Ramayya (2014)
- Diksha (1991)

==== Dil–Dim ====
- Dil: (1990 & 2003)
- Dil Aashna Hai (1992)
- Dil Apna Aur Preet Parai (1960)
- Dil Apna Punjabi (2006)
- Dil Aur Deewaar (1978)
- Dil Bechara (2020)
- Dil Bechara Pyaar Ka Maara (2004)
- Dil Bhi Tera Hum Bhi Tere (1960)
- Dil Bole Hadippa! (2009)
- Dil Chahta Hai (2001)
- Dil Daulat Duniya (1972)
- Dil Deke Dekho (1959)
- Dil Dhadakne Do (2015)
- Dil Diwana (1974)
- Dil Diya Dard Liya (1966)
- Dil Diya Hai (2006)
- Dil Diyan Gallan (2018) (TV)
- Dil Dosti Deewangi (2023)
- Dil Dosti Etc (2007)
- Dil Ek Mandir (1963)
- Dil Farosh (1927)
- Dil Hai Betaab (1993)
- Dil Hai Ke Manta Nahin (1991)
- Dil Hai Tumhaara (2002)
- Dil Hi To Hai: (1963 & 1992)
- Dil Jo Bhi Kahey... (2005)
- Dil Jo Na Keh Saka (2017)
- Dil Juunglee (2018)
- Dil Ka Kya Kasoor (1992)
- Dil Ka Raja (1972)
- Dil Ka Rishta (2003)
- Dil Kaa Heera (1979)
- Dil Kabaddi (2008)
- Dil Ke Jharoke Main (1997)
- Dil Ke Tukre (1965)
- Dil Ki Baazi (1993)
- Dil Ki Rahen (1973)
- Dil Ki Rani (1947)
- Dil Kya Kare (1999)
- Dil Maange More (2004)
- Dil Mera Dhadkan Teri (2013) (TV)
- Dil Mera Dharkan Teri (1968)
- Dil Ne Jise Apna Kahaa (2004)
- Dil Ne Phir Yaad Kiya: (1966 & 2001)
- Dil Pardesi Ho Gaya (2013)
- Dil Pardesi Ho Gayaa (2003)
- Dil Pe Mat Le Yaar!! (2000)
- Dil Rangeela (2014)
- Dil Se.. (1998)
- Dil Se Mile Dil (1978)
- Dil Tera Aashiq (1993)
- Dil Tera Diwana: (1962 & 1996)
- Dil Tera Hogaya (2020) (TV)
- Dil To Pagal Hai (1997)
- Dil Toh Baccha Hai Ji (2011)
- Dil Toh Deewana Hai (2016)
- Dil Tujhko Diya (1987)
- Dil Vil Pyaar Vyaar (2014)
- Dil Vil Pyar Vyar (2002)
- Dil-E-Nadaan (1953)
- Dilbar (1994)
- Dilber's Eight Days (2008)
- Dilema (2012)
- Dilemma (1962)
- The Dilemma: (1914 & 2011)
- Dilemma of Two Angels (1948)
- The Dilettante (1999)
- Dilili in Paris (2018)
- Diljalaa (1987)
- Diljale (1996)
- Dillagi: (1942, 1949, 1966, 1974, 1978 & 1999)
- Dillagi... Yeh Dillagi (unreleased)
- Dilli (2011)
- Dilli Gang (2013)
- Dilli Ka Thug (1958)
- Dillinger: (1945, 1960 TV, 1973 & 1991 TV)
- Dillinger and Capone (1995)
- Dillinger Is Dead (1969)
- Dilliwala Rajakumaran (1996)
- Dilliwali Zaalim Girlfriend (2015)
- Dilwaala (1986)
- Dilwala (2013)
- Dilwale: (1994 & 2015)
- Dilwale Dulhania Le Jayenge (1995)
- Dilwale Kabhi Na Hare (1992)
- Dim Sum Funeral (2008)
- Dim Sum: A Little Bit of Heart (1985)
- Dimboola (1979)
- Dimension (2010)
- Dimension 5 (1966)
- Dimensions: (2011 & 2018)
- Dimensions of Dialogue (1983)
- Diminuendo (2018)
- Dimitri Donskoj (1909)
- Dimples: (1916 & 1936)

==== Din–Diz ====
- Diner: (1982 & 2019)
- Dingjun Mountain (1905)
- Dingo (1991)
- The Dingo (1923)
- The Dinner: (1998, 2013, 2014 & 2017)
- Dinner for Adele (1977)
- Dinner in America (2020)
- Dinner at Eight: (1933 & 1989 TV)
- The Dinner Game (1999)
- Dinner Rush (2002)
- Dinner for Schmucks (2010)
- Dinner Time (1928)
- Dino Time (2012)
- Dinosaur (2000)
- Dinosaur 13 (2013)
- Dinosaurus! (1960)
- Diplomacy: (1916, 1926 & 2014)
- Diplomat (2012)
- Diplomats (1918)
- The Diplomats (1929)
- Director's Cut (2016)
- Dirigible (1931)
- Dirt: (1994 & 1998)
- The Dirt (2019)
- Dirt! The Movie (2009)
- Dirty: (1998, 2005 & 2020)
- Dirty Dancing: (1987 & 2017)
- Dirty Dancing: Havana Nights (2004)
- Dirty Deeds (2002 & 2005)
- Dirty Dingus Magee (1970)
- The Dirty Dozen (1967)
- Dirty Duck (1974)
- Dirty Grandpa (2016)
- Dirty Harry (1971)
- Dirty Laundry: (2006 & 2012)
- Dirty Little Billy (1972)
- Dirty Love (2005)
- Dirty Mary, Crazy Larry (1974)
- The Dirty Picture (2011)
- Dirty Pretty Things (2002)
- Dirty Rotten Scoundrels (1988)
- A Dirty Shame (2004)
- Dirty Weekend: (1973, 1993 & 2015)
- Dirty Work: (1933, 1934 & 1998)
- The Disappearance of Alice Creed (2009)
- Disappearance at Clifton Hill (2019)
- The Disappeared: (2008 & 2012)
- Disappearing Acts (2000)
- The Disappointments Room (2016)
- The Disaster Artist (2017)
- Disaster Movie (2008)
- Disciples of the 36th Chamber (1985)
- Disciples of Hippocrates (1980)
- Disclosure: (1994 & 2020)
- Disclosure: Trans Lives on Screen (2020)
- Disco Beaver from Outer Space (1979)
- Disco Dancer (1982)
- Disco Godfather (1980)
- Disconnect: (2012 & 2018)
- Disconnected: (1984 & 2021)
- The Discovery (2017)
- Discreet (2017)
- The Discreet Charm of the Bourgeoisie (1972)
- Disenchanted (2022)
- The Dish (2000)
- Dishonored (1931)
- Dishonored Lady (1947)
- Disney Princess Enchanted Tales: Follow Your Dreams (2007)
- Disney's The Kid (2000)
- Disobedience (2017)
- The Disorderly Orderly (1964)
- Disorganized Crime (1989)
- Disraeli (1916, 1921 & 1929)
- Distance: (2001 & 2015)
- Distant (2002)
- Distant Drums (1951)
- Distant Lights: (1987 & 2003)
- Distant Thunder: (1973 & 1988)
- Distant Voices, Still Lives (1988)
- The Distinguished Gentleman (1992)
- District 9 (2009)
- District B13 (2004)
- Disturbia (2007)
- Disturbing Behavior (1998)
- Ditto (1937 & 2000)
- Diva (1981)
- Divan (2004)
- Dive Bomber (1941)
- Divergent (2014)
- The Divide (2012)
- Divide and Conquer (1943)
- The Divided Heart (1954)
- Divided We Fall (2000)
- Divine (1935)
- The Divine Comedy (1991)
- Divine Intervention (2002)
- Divine Madness! (1980)
- Divine Secrets of the Ya-Ya Sisterhood (2002)
- The Divine Weapon (2008)
- The Diving Bell and the Butterfly (2007)
- Divinity (2023)
- Il divo: La spettacolare vita di Giulio Andreotti (2008)
- Le Divorce (2003)
- Divorce Italian Style (1961)
- The Divorce of Lady X (1938)
- The Divorcee (1930)
- Divorcing Jack (1998)
- Dixie (1943)
- Dixie Chicks: Shut Up and Sing (2006)
- Dixie Days (1930)
- Dixie Dugan (1943)
- Dixie Dynamite (1976)
- Dixie Land (2015)
- Dixieland (2015)
- Diya (2018)
- Dizziness (1946)

=== Dj ===
- Django: (1966 & 2017)
- Django the Bastard (1969)
- Django the Condemned (1965)
- Django Defies Sartana (1970)
- Django & Django (2021)
- Django Kill... If You Live, Shoot! (1967)
- Django and Sartana Are Coming... It's the End (1970)
- Django Shoots First (1966)
- Django Strikes Again (1987)
- Django Unchained (2012)
- Django, Prepare a Coffin (1968)
- The Djarn Djarns (2005)
- Djed i baka se rastaju (1996)
- Djibouti (2021)
- Djihad (2006)
- Djinn: (2013 & 2023)
- The Djinn (2021)
- Djinns (2010)

=== Dm–Dn ===
- DMT: The Spirit Molecule (2010)
- DMX: Don't Try to Understand (2021)
- DNA (1996)
- DNA (2020)
- DNA (2024)
- DNA (2025)

=== Do ===
- Do Aankhen (1974)
- Do Aankhen Barah Haath (1957)
- Do Anjaane (1976)
- Do Ankhen Barah Hath (1997)
- Do Ansoo (1950)
- Do Aur Do Paanch (1980)
- Do Bachche Dus Haath (1972)
- Do Badan (1966)
- Do Be Quick (1977)
- Do Bhai: (1947 & 1969)
- Do Bigha Zameen (1953)
- Do Boond Pani (1971)
- Do Chattane (1974)
- Do Chehere (1977)
- Do Chor (1972)
- Do Communists Have Better Sex? (2006)
- Do Detectives Think? (1927)
- Do Dilon Ki Dastaan: (1966 & 1985)
- Do Dishayen (1982)
- Do Diwane (1936)
- Do Dooni Chaar: (1968 & 2010)
- Do Dooni Panj (2019)
- Do Fantoosh (1994)
- Do Fish Do It? (2002)
- Do Gaz Zameen Ke Neeche (1972)
- Do Hanso Ka Joda (1992)
- Do I Exist: A Riddle (2019)
- Do I Have to Kill My Child? (1976)
- Do I Have to Take Care of Everything? (2012)
- Do I Sound Gay? (2014)
- Do It Again (2010)
- Do It for Johnny (2007)
- Do It Like an Hombre (2017)
- Do It Now (1924)
- Do It — One! (1990)
- Do Jasoos (1975)
- Do Jhoot (1975)
- Do Kaliyaan (1968)
- Do Khiladi (1976)
- Do Knot Disturb (2009)
- Do Lachhian (1960)
- Do Ladke Dono Kadke (1979)
- Do Ladkiyan (1976)
- Do Lado de Fora (2014)
- Do Lafzon Ki Kahani (2016)
- Do Mastane (1958)
- Do Matwale (1991)
- Do Men Love Women? (1912)
- Do Musafir (1978)
- Do Nambar Ke Amir (1974)
- Do Not Disturb: (1965, 1999, 2010, 2012, 2014 & 2016)
- Do Not Enter: (2024 & 2026)
- Do Not Erase (2006)
- Do Not Fall in New York City (2012)
- Do Not Fold, Spindle or Mutilate (1971)
- Do Not Fold, Staple, Spindle or Mutilate (1967)
- Do Not Forget Me Istanbul (2011)
- Do Not Go Gentle (2002)
- Do Not Hesitate (2021)
- Do Not Marry, Girls (1985)
- Do Not Part with Your Beloved (1980)
- Do Not Send Your Wife to Italy (1960)
- Do Not Shoot at White Swans (1980)
- Do Not Split (2020)
- Do Paise Ki Dhoop, Chaar Aane Ki Baarish (2009)
- Do Pal (1991)
- Do Revenge (2022)
- Do the Right Thing (1989)
- #DoYouThinkIAmSEXY? (2022)
- Do You See Me? (2014)

==== Doa–Dom ====
- DOA: Dead or Alive (2006)
- Dobaara: See Your Evil (2017)
- Dobara Phir Se (2016)
- Dobermann (1997)
- Doc (1971)
- Doc Hollywood (1991)
- Doc Savage: The Man of Bronze (1975)
- Doc West (2009)
- Docking (2019)
- Docking the Boat (1965)
- Docks of New York (1945)
- The Docks of New York (1928)
- Docks of San Francisco (1932)
- Docteur Françoise Gailland (1976)
- Docteur Jekyll et les femmes (1981)
- Docteur Petiot (1990)
- Doctor Aybolit (1938)
- Doctor Detroit (1983)
- Doctor Dolittle (1967)
- Doctor Dracula (1978)
- Doctor Faustus: (1967 & 1982)
- Doctor in the House (1954)
- Doctor Lisa (2020)
- Doctor Sleep: (2002 & 2019)
- Doctor Strange series:
  - Doctor Strange: (1978 & 2016)
  - Doctor Strange in the Multiverse of Madness (2022)
  - Doctor Strange: The Sorcerer Supreme (2007)
- Doctor Who (1996 TV)
- Doctor, You've Got to Be Kidding! (1967)
- Doctor X (1932)
- Doctor Zhivago (1965)
- A Doctor's Diary (1937)
- The Doctor's Dilemma (1958)
- Dodesukaden (1970)
- Dodge City (1939)
- Dodgeball: A True Underdog Story (2004)
- Dodsworth (1936)
- Does It Pay? (1923)
- Dog: (2001 & 2022)
- The Dog (2013)
- Dog Altogether (2007)
- Dog Bite Dog (2006)
- Dog Day (1984)
- Dog Day Afternoon (1975)
- Dog Days: (1925, 1970, 2001 & 2018)
- Dog Days of Summer (2007)
- Dog Daze: (1937 & 1939)
- A Dog in a Drawer (1982)
- Dog Eat Dog: (1964, 2001, 2008, 2016 & 2018)
- Dog Factory (1904)
- A Dog of Flanders: (1935, 1959 & 1999)
- Dog Gone: (1926, 2008 & 2023)
- Dog Gone People (1960)
- Dog Heaven (1927)
- Dog Jack (2010)
- Dog Man (2025)
- Dog Nail Clipper (2004)
- Dog Park (1998)
- Dog Pound (2010)
- Dog Pounded (1954)
- Dog Shy (1926)
- Dog Soldiers (2002)
- Dog Star Man (1961)
- The Dog Stars (2026)
- Dog Tags (2008)
- Dog Tales (1958)
- The Dog Who Stopped the War (1984)
- The Dog Who Wouldn't Be Quiet (2021)
- A Dog's Breakfast (2006)
- Dog's Dialogue (1977)
- Dog's Heads (1955)
- A Dog's Journey (2019)
- Dog's Life (2013)
- A Dog's Life (1918)
- A Dog's Purpose (2017)
- A Dog's Will (2000)
- Dogfight (1991)
- Doggie March (1963)
- Doggone Cats (1947)
- Doggone Tired (1949)
- Doghead (2006)
- Doghouse (2009)
- Dogma (1999)
- Dogs: (1976 & 2016)
- The Dogs (1979)
- Dogs Don't Wear Pants (2019)
- Dogs in Space (1987)
- Dogs of War (1923)
- The Dogs of War (1980)
- Dogtooth (2009)
- Dogtown (1997)
- Dogtown and Z-Boys (2001)
- Dogville (2003)
- Doing Time for Patsy Cline (1997)
- Dolan's Cadillac (2009)
- La Dolce Vita (1960)
- Dolemite (1975)
- Dolemite Is My Name (2019)
- Dolittle (2020)
- The Doll: (1919, 1968 & 2015)
- Doll Master (2004)
- A Doll's House: (1917, 1918, 1922, 1943, 1956, 1959, 1973 Garland, 1973 Losey & 1992 TV)
- Dollman (1991)
- Dollman vs. Demonic Toys (1993)
- Dolls: (1987, 2002, 2006, 2007 & 2013)
- Dolly Ki Doli (2015)
- Dolores Claiborne (1995)
- Dolphin Reef (2020)
- Dolphin Tale (2011)
- Dolphin Tale 2 (2014)
- Dolphins (2000)
- Domestic Disturbance (2001)
- The Domestics (2018)
- Dominick and Eugene (1988)
- Dominion: Prequel to the Exorcist (2005)
- Domino: (1988 & 2005)
- The Domino Principle (1977)

==== Don–Doz ====
- Don: (1978, 2006 Dutch, 2006 Indian, 2007 & 2022)
- Don 2 (2011)
- The Don Is Dead (1973)
- Don Giovanni: (1970 & 1979)
- Don Juan DeMarco (1995)
- Don Jon (2013)
- La donna di notte (1962)
- Don Number One (2012)
- Don Q, Son of Zorro (1925)
- Don Quixote: (1923, 1933, 1957, 1973, 2000 & 2010)
- Don Quixote de la Mancha (1947)
- Don's Party (1976)
- Don's Plum (2001)
- Don't Be a Menace to South Central While Drinking Your Juice in the Hood (1996)
- Don't Be Afraid (2011)
- Don't Be Afraid of the Dark: (1973 & 2010)
- Don't Blink (2014)
- Don't Bother to Knock (1952)
- Don't Breathe: (2014 & 2016)
- Don't Breathe 2 (2021)
- Don't Come Knocking (2005)
- Don't Cry, It's Only Thunder (1982)
- Don't Cry, Nanking (1995)
- Don't Deliver Us from Evil (1971)
- Don't Drink the Water: (1969 & 1994 TV)
- Don't Give Up the Ship (1959)
- Don't Go in the House (1980)
- Don't Go in the Woods: (1981 & 2010)
- Don't Hang Up (2016)
- Don't Knock the Rock (1956)
- Don't Knock Twice (2016)
- Don't Let the Angels Fall (1969)
- Don't Let Go: (2002 & 2019)
- Don't Listen (2020)
- Don't Look Back (1996)
- Don't Look Back (1999)
- Don't Look Back (2009)
- Don't Look Back: The Story of Leroy 'Satchel' Paige (1981 TV)
- Don't Look in the Attic (1981)
- Don't Look Now (1973)
- Don't Look Under the Bed (1999 TV)
- Don't Look Up: (1996 & 2021)
- Don't Lose Your Head (1967)
- Don't Make Waves (1967)
- Don't Move: (2004 & 2024)
- Don't Open till Christmas (1984)
- Don't Play Us Cheap (1972)
- Don't Raise the Bridge, Lower the River (1968)
- Don't Say a Word (2001)
- Don't Tell Her It's Me (1990)
- Don't Tell Mom the Babysitter's Dead (1991)
- Don't Torture a Duckling (1972)
- Don't Worry Darling (2022)
- Don't Worry, He Won't Get Far on Foot (2018)
- Dona Flor and Her Two Husbands (1976)
- Donald Duck series:
  - Donald Gets Drafted (1942)
  - Donald in Mathmagic Land (1959)
  - Donald's Cousin Gus (1939)
  - Donald's Golf Game (1938)
  - Donald's Nephews (1938)
- Donbass (2018)
- Dongju: The Portrait of a Poet (2016)
- Donkey Punch (2008)
- Donkey Skin (1970)
- Donkey Xote (2007)
- Donnie Brasco (1997)
- Donnie Darko (2001)
- Donovan's Brain (1953)
- Donovan's Reef (1963)
- Dont Look Back (1967)
- Doodeind (2006)
- Doodlebug (1997)
- Doogal (2006)
- Doom (2005)
- The Doom Generation (1995)
- Doomsday: (1928 & 2008)
- Door to Door (2002 TV)
- The Door in the Floor (2004)
- The Doors (1991)
- Dopamine (2003)
- Doppelgänger (1969)
- Doppelganger: (1993 & 2003)
- Dora and the Lost City of Gold (2019)
- Dora and the Search for Sol Dorado (2025)
- El Dorado: (1921, 1963, 1966 & 1988)
- Doraemon: Nobita's Space Hero Record of Space Heroes (2015)
- Dorf series:
  - Dorf Goes Auto Racing (1990)
  - Dorf on the Diamond (1996)
  - Dorf Goes Fishing (1993)
  - Dorf and the First Games of Mount Olympus (1988)
  - Dorf on Golf (1987)
  - Dorf's Golf Bible (1987)
- Dorian Blues (2004)
- Dorian Gray: (1970 & 2009)
- Dorm (2006)
- The Dorm That Dripped Blood (1983)
- Dorothy and the Witches of Oz (2012)
- Dosti: Friends Forever (2005)
- Dot and the Bunny (1983)
- Dot the I (2003)
- Dot and the Kangaroo (1977)
- Dot and Keeto (1986)
- Dot and the Koala (1985)
- Dot and Santa Claus (1982)
- Dot and the Smugglers (1987)
- Dot in Space (1994)
- Dot and the Whale (1986)
- Dot Goes to Hollywood (1987)
- The Double: (1934, 1971, 2011 & 2013)
- The Double 0 Kid (1992)
- The Double Bed (1965)
- Double Crossbones (1951)
- Double Door (1934)
- Double Dragon (1994)
- Double Exposure: (1944, 1954, 1994 & 2014)
- Double Harness (1933)
- Double Impact (1991)
- Double Indemnity: (1944 & 1973 TV)
- Double Jeopardy: (1955, 1992 TV & 1999)
- A Double Life: (1924, 1947 & 1954)
- The Double Life of Véronique (1991)
- The Double Man: (1967 & 1976)
- The Double McGuffin (1979)
- Double Suicide: (1918 & 1969)
- Double Suicide: Japanese Summer (1967)
- Double Take: (1998, 2001 & 2009)
- Double Tap (2000)
- Double Team (1997)
- Double Teamed (2002 TV)
- Double Trouble (1967, 1984 & 2026)
- Double Vision (1992 & 2002)
- Double Wedding: (1933, 1937 & 2010 TV)
- Double Whammy (2001)
- Double Whoopee (1929)
- Double Xposure (2012)
- Doubles: (2000 & 2011)
- Doubt: (1951, 2003, 2008 & 2009)
- Doubtful (2017)
- Doug's 1st Movie (1999)
- Dough and Dynamite (1914)
- Douglas Fairbanks in Robin Hood (1922)
- Le Doulos (1962)
- Douro, Faina Fluvial (1931)
- The Dove: (1927, 1968 & 1974)
- The Dove's Lost Necklace (1994)
- Down (2001)
- Down Among the Z Men (1952)
- Down a Dark Hall (2018)
- Down in the Delta (1998)
- Down and Derby (2005)
- Down to Earth: (1917, 1932, 1947, 1995 & 2001)
- Down House (2001)
- Down by Law (1986)
- Down with Love (2003)
- Down and Out in Beverly Hills (1986)
- Down Periscope (1996)
- Down to the Sea in Ships (1922 & 1949)
- Down Terrace (2009)
- Down in the Valley (2006)
- Down to You (2000)
- The Downfall (1961)
- Downfall: (1997 & 2004)
- The Downhill (1961)
- Downhill: (1927, 2014, 2016 & 2020)
- Downhill Racer (1969)
- Downloading Nancy (2008)
- Downpour (1971)
- Downrange (2017)
- Downtime (1995)
- Downton Abbey (2019)
- Downton Abbey: A New Era (2022)
- Downton Abbey: The Grand Finale (2025)
- Downtown (1990)
- Downtown 81 (2000)
- Dozakh in Search of Heaven (2013)

=== Dr ===
- Dr. 56 (2022)
- Dr. Akagi (1998)
- Dr. Alien (1989)
- Dr. Anand (1966)
- Dr. B. R. Ambedkar (2005)
- Dr. Babasahed Ambedkar (2000)
- Dr. Bezbarua (1969)
- Dr. Bezbaruah 2 (2023)
- Dr. Bird's Advice for Sad Poets (2021)
- Dr. Black, Mr. Hyde (1976)
- Dr. Brinks & Dr. Brinks (2017)
- Dr. Broadway (1942)
- Dr. Cabbie (2014)
- Dr. Caligari (1989)
- Dr. Chopper (2005)
- Dr. Christian Meets the Women (1940)
- Dr. Coppelius (1966)
- Dr. Crippen (1962)
- Dr. Cyclops (1940)
- Dr. Devil and Mr. Hare (1964)
- Dr. Dolittle series:
  - Dr. Dolittle (1998)
  - Dr. Dolittle 2 (2001)
  - Dr. Dolittle 3 (2005)
  - Dr. Dolittle: Million Dollar Mutts (2009)
  - Dr. Dolittle: Tail to the Chief (2008)
- Dr. Gama (2021)
- Dr. Giggles (1992)
- Dr. Goldfoot and the Bikini Machine (1965)
- Dr. Goldfoot and the Girl Bombs (1966)
- Dr. Hackenstein (1988)
- Dr. Hart's Diary (1917)
- Dr. Heckyl and Mr. Hype (1980)
- Dr. Holl (1951)
- Dr. Jack (1922)
- Dr. Jekyll Likes Them Hot (1979)
- Dr. Jekyll and Mr. Hyde: (1908, 1912, 1913, 1920 Haydon, 1920 Paramount, 1931, 1941, 2002 & 2008)
- Dr. Jekyll and Ms. Hyde (1995)
- Dr. Jekyll and Sister Hyde (1971)
- Dr. Jekyll y el Hombre Lobo (1972)
- Dr. Jerkyl's Hide (1954)
- Dr. Knock (1951)
- Dr. Kotnis Ki Amar Kahani (1946)
- Dr. Lamb (1992)
- Dr. M (1990)
- Dr. Mabuse the Gambler (1922)
- Dr. Madhurika (1935)
- Dr. Mekam (2018)
- Dr. Minx (1975)
- Dr. Monica (1934)
- Dr. Nawariyan (2017)
- Dr. No (1962)
- Dr. O'Dowd (1940)
- Dr. Orloff's Monster (1965)
- Dr. Otto and the Riddle of the Gloom Beam (1985)
- Dr. Pasupathy (1990)
- Dr. Patient (2009)
- Dr. Phibes Rises Again (1972)
- Dr. Pomerantz (2011)
- Dr. Popaul (1972)
- Dr. Prakash Baba Amte – The Real Hero (2014)
- Dr. Pyckle and Mr. Pryde (1925)
- Dr. Renault's Secret (1942)
- Dr. Seuss' How the Grinch Stole Christmas (2000)
- Dr. Seuss' The Lorax (2012)
- Dr. Sex (1964)
- Dr. Siva (1975)
- Dr. Strange (1978)
- Dr. Strangelove or: How I Learned to Stop Worrying and Love the Bomb (1964)
- Dr. Sun Yat-sen (1986)
- Dr. T & the Women (2000)
- Dr. Terror's Gallery of Horrors (1967)
- Dr. Terror's House of Horrors (1965)
- Dr. Vidya (1962)
- Dr. Wai in "The Scripture with No Words" (1996)
- Dr. Wake's Patient (1916)
- Dr. Who and the Daleks (1965)

==== Dra–Dre ====
- Dracula: (1931 English-language, 1931 Spanish-language, 1958, 1968, 1979, 2006 TV, 2025 French & 2025 Romanian)
- Dracula 2000 series:
  - Dracula 2000 (2000)
  - Dracula II: Ascension (2003)
  - Dracula III: Legacy (2005)
- Dracula 2012 (2013)
- Dracula 3D (2012)
- Dracula 3000 (2004)
- Dracula AD 1972 (1972)
- Dracula Blows His Cool (1979)
- Dracula vs. Frankenstein (1971)
- Dracula Has Risen from the Grave (1968)
- Dracula in the Provinces (1975)
- Dracula Reborn (2012)
- Dracula Sir (2020)
- Dracula and Son (1976)
- Dracula Sucks (1978)
- Dracula Untold (2014)
- Dracula's Daughter (1936)
- Dracula's Death (1921)
- Dracula's Dog (1978)
- Dracula's Widow (1988)
- Dracula: The Dark Prince (2013)
- Dracula: Dead and Loving It (1995)
- Dracula: Pages from a Virgin's Diary (2002)
- Dracula: Prince of Darkness (1966)
- Dracula: Sovereign of The Damned (1980 TV)
- The Draft! (2023)
- Draft Day (2014)
- The Draft Horse (1942)
- Draftee Daffy (1945)
- Drag (1926)
- Drag (2026)
- The Drag (1965)
- Drag Invasion (2020)
- Drag Me to Hell (2009)
- The Drag Net (1928)
- The Drag-Net (1936)
- Dragged Across Concrete (2018)
- Dragnet: (1947, 1954, & 1987)
- Dragnet Girl (1933)
- Dragnet Patrol (1931)
- Dragon (2006)
- Dragon (2011)
- Dragon (2025)
- Dragon: The Bruce Lee Story (1993)
- Dragon Age: Dawn of the Seeker (2012)
- Dragon Around (1954)
- A Dragon Arrives! (2016)
- Dragon Ball series:
  - Dragon Ball: Curse of the Blood Rubies (1986)
  - Dragon Ball: Sleeping Princess in Devil's Castle (1987)
  - Dragon Ball: Mystical Adventure (1988)
  - Dragon Ball Z: Dead Zone (1989)
  - Dragon Ball Z: The World's Strongest (1990)
  - Dragon Ball Z: The Tree of Might (1990)
  - Dragon Ball Z: Lord Slug (1991)
  - Dragon Ball Z: Cooler's Revenge (1991)
  - Dragon Ball Z: The Return of Cooler (1992)
  - Dragon Ball Z: Super Android 13! (1992)
  - Dragon Ball Z: Broly – The Legendary Super Saiyan (1993)
  - Dragon Ball Z: Bojack Unbound (1993)
  - Dragon Ball Z: Broly – Second Coming (1994)
  - Dragon Ball Z: Bio-Broly (1994)
  - Dragon Ball Z: Fusion Reborn (1995)
  - Dragon Ball Z: Wrath of the Dragon (1995)
  - Dragon Ball: The Path to Power (1996)
  - Dragonball Evolution (2009)
  - Dragon Ball Z: Battle of Gods (2013)
  - Dragon Ball Z: Fukkatsu no F (2015)
  - Dragon Ball Super: Broly (2018)
  - Dragon Ball Super: Super Hero (2022)
- Dragon Blade (2015)
- Dragon Boys (2007 TV)
- Dragon Chow (1987)
- The Dragon Chronicles – The Maidens (1994)
- Dragon Crusaders (2011)
- The Dragon Defense (2017)
- Dragon Dilatation (2024)
- Dragon Eyes (2012)
- The Dragon Family (1988)
- Dragon Fight (1989)
- Dragon Fighter (2003) (TV)
- Dragon Fire (1993)
- Dragon Fist (1979)
- Dragon Force (1982)
- Dragon Force: So Long, Ultraman (2017)
- Dragon Heart: Adventures Beyond This World (2025)
- The Dragon, the Hero (1979)
- Dragon Hill, la colina del dragón (2002)
- Dragon Hunters (2008)
- Dragon Inn (1967)
- Dragon in Jail (1990)
- The Dragon Knight (2011)
- Dragon Lee vs. The Five Brothers (1978)
- The Dragon Lives (1976)
- The Dragon Lives Again (1977)
- Dragon Lord (1982)
- The Dragon Murder Case (1934)
- Dragon Nest: Warriors' Dawn (2014)
- The Dragon Painter (1919)
- The Dragon Pearl (2011)
- The Dragon of Pendragon Castle (1950)
- Dragon Princess (1981)
- Dragon Quest: Your Story (2019)
- Dragon Rapide (1986)
- Dragon Rider (2020)
- The Dragon from Russia (1990)
- Dragon Seed (1944)
- The Dragon Spell (2016)
- Dragon Squad (2005)
- Dragon Storm (2004) (TV)
- The Dragon Tamers (1975)
- The Dragon That Wasn't (Or Was He?) (1983)
- Dragon Tiger Gate (2006)
- Dragon Trap (2010)
- The Dragon, the Young Master (1978)
- The Dragon's Blood (1957)
- Dragon's Gold (1954)
- The Dragon's Net (1920)
- The Dragon's Snake Fist (1981)
- Dragonball Evolution (2009)
- Dragones: destino de fuego (2006)
- Dragonflies (2022)
- Dragonfly (2001)
- Dragonfly (2002)
- Dragonfly (2025)
- Dragonheart series:
  - Dragonheart (1996)
  - Dragonheart: A New Beginning (2000)
  - Dragonheart 3: The Sorcerer's Curse (2015)
  - Dragonheart: Battle for the Heartfire (2017)
  - Dragonheart: Vengeance (2020)
- Dragonkeeper (2024)
- Dragonlance: Dragons of Autumn Twilight (2007)
- Dragons 3D (2013)
- Dragons: Fire and Ice (2004)
- Dragons Forever (1988)
- The Dragons of Galapagos (1998)
- Dragons: Gift of the Night Fury (2011)
- Dragonslayer (1981)
- Dragonslayer (2011)
- Dragonworld (1994)
- Dragonworld: The Legend Continues (1999)
- Dragonwyck (1946)
- Dragstrip Girl (1957)
- Dragstrip Girl (1994)
- Drahý zesnulý (1964)
- Drained (2006)
- Drained (2024)
- The Drake Case (1929)
- Drake of England (1935)
- Drake & Josh Go Hollywood (2006)
- Drake's Venture (1980)
- Drama (2010)
- Drama (2012)
- Drama (2018)
- Drama (2022)
- The Drama (2026)
- Drama in the Air (1904)
- Drama from Ancient Life (1971)
- The Drama of Dresden (2005) (TV)
- Drama in the Futurists' Cabaret No. 13 (1914)
- Drama in a Gypsy Camp near Moscow (1909)
- Drama of the Lark (1963)
- Drama in Moscow (1909)
- The Drama of the St. Mary's Church Tower (1913)
- Drama on the Tiber (1952)
- Dramarama (2001)
- Dramarama (2020)
- A Dramatic Night (2015)
- Dramatic School (1938)
- Drapchi (2013)
- Draquila – L'Italia che trema (2010)
- Draug (2018)
- The Draughtsman's Contract (1982)
- The Draughtsmen Clash (1996)
- Draupadi (1931)
- Draupadi Vastrapaharanam (1934)
- Draupadi Vastrapaharanam (1936)
- Draupathi (2020)
- Draupathi 2 (2026)
- Dravci (1948)
- Dravidan (1989)
- Draw! (1984 TV)
- The Drawer Boy (2017)
- Drawing Closer (2024)
- Drawing Flies (1996)
- Drawing Home (2017)
- The Drawing Lesson (1903)
- Drawing the Line (1915)
- Drawing the Line: A Portrait of Keith Haring (1989)
- Drawing Restraint 9 (2005)
- Drawn Together (2026)
- The Drawn Together Movie: The Movie! (2010)
- The Drayman and the King (1989)
- The Drayton Case (1953)
- Dread (2009)
- DreadClub: Vampire's Verdict (2024)
- The Dreadful (2026)
- Dreadful Chapters (2023)
- Dreadnaught (1981)
- Dream (2008)
- Dream (2012)
- Dream (2023)
- The Dream: (1911, 1966, 1985, 1987, 1989)
- Dream Big: Engineering Our World (2017)
- Dream Boy (2008)
- Dream Castle (1933)
- Dream City (1973)
- Dream of a Cossack (1951)
- Dream Demon (1988)
- Dream Doll (1979)
- Dream Eater (2025)
- Dream Empire (2016)
- The Dream Factory (1997)
- Dream with the Fishes (1997)
- Dream Flight (1982)
- The Dream of Garuda (1994)
- Dream Girl (1948)
- Dream Girl (1977)
- Dream Girl (2009)
- Dream Girl (2019)
- Dream Girl (2026)
- The Dream Girl (1916)
- Dream Girl 2 (2023)
- Dream Home (2010)
- Dream Horse (2020)
- Dream House (1931)
- Dream House (2011)
- Dream for an Insomniac (1996)
- Dream Kitchen (1999)
- Dream Life (1972)
- Dream of Light (1992)
- Dream a Little Dream (1989)
- Dream a Little Dream 2 (1995)
- Dream Love (1935)
- Dream of Love (1928)
- Dream Lover (1986)
- Dream Lover (1993)
- Dream Lovers (1986)
- Dream Machine (1991)
- Dream No Evil (1970)
- Dream On (2015)
- Dream On Silly Dreamer (2005)
- Dream of a Rarebit Fiend (1906)
- Dream and Reality (1901)
- Dream of the Red Chamber (1944)
- Dream of the Rhine (1933)
- Dream Scenario (2023)
- Dream and Silence (2012)
- Dream Stall (2026)
- Dream Street (1921)
- Dream of a Summer Night (1983)
- Dream Team (1999)
- Dream Team (2026)
- The Dream Team (1989)
- The Dream Team (2012)
- Dream Team 1935 (2012)
- Dream Tracks (1989)
- Dream Waltz (1943)
- Dream Weavers: Beijing 2008 (2008)
- Dream Well (2009)
- Dream Wife (1953)
- Dream/Killer (2015)
- Dreamboat (1952)
- Dreambuilders (2020)
- Dreamcatcher (2003)
- Dreamcatcher (2015)
- Dreamcatcher (2021)
- Dreamchild (1985)
- Dreamer (1979)
- Dreamer (2005)
- Dreamers (2009)
- Dreamers (2025)
- The Dreamer: (1936, 1965 & 1970)
- The Dreamers (2003)
- Dreamfools (2018)
- Dreamgirls (2006)
- Dreamin' Wild (2022)
- Dreaming: (1944 British & 1944 German)
- The Dreaming (1988)
- Dreaming Days (1951)
- Dreaming of Denmark (2015)
- Dreaming & Dying (2023)
- Dreaming Grand Avenue (2020)
- Dreaming of a Jewish Christmas (2017)
- Dreaming of Joseph Lees (1999)
- Dreaming of Julia (2003)
- Dreaming Lhasa (2005)
- Dreaming Lips (1932)
- Dreaming Lips (1937)
- Dreaming Lips (1953)
- Dreaming of Lords (1988)
- Dreaming Machine (unreleased)
- Dremaing Out Loud (1940)
- Dreaming of Rita (1993)
- Dreaming the Rose (1986)
- Dreaming of Space (2005)
- Dreaming of a Vetter World (2018)
- Dreaming of Words (2021)
- Dreamkeeper (2003)
- Dreamkiller (2010)
- Dreamland: (2006, 2007, 2009, 2016, 2019 American & 2019 Canadian)
- Dreamland: The Burning of Black Wall Street (2021) (TV)
- The Dreamlife of Angels (1998)
- Dreamplay (1994)
- Dreams (1955)
- Dreams (1990)
- Dreams (1993)
- Dreams (2004)
- Dreams (2006)
- Dreams (2016)
- Dreams (2025)
- Dreams Awake (2011)
- Dreams Beyond Memory (1987)
- Dreams Choked (2017)
- Dreams Come True (1936)
- Dreams Die at Dawn (1961)
- Dreams in a Drawer (1957)
- Dreams of Glass (1970)
- Dreams of Glory (1953)
- Dreams of Gold: The Mel Fisher Story (1986) (TV)
- Dreams for Life (2004)
- Dreams from the Middle of the World (1998)
- Dreams in Nightmares (2024)
- Dreams Rewired (2015)
- Dreams for Sale (2012)
- Dreams and Shadows (2009)
- Dreams That Money Can Buy (1947)
- Dreamscape: (1984 & 2007)
- Dreamz (2000)
- Dredd (2012)
- Drei Unteroffiziere (1939)
- The Dresden Sun (2026)
- Dressed to Kill: (1941, 1946 & 1980)
- The Dresser: (1983 & 2015)

==== Dri ====
- Dribbling with their Future (2016)
- Drift Away (2021)
- Drift Fence (1936)
- Drift: The Sideways Craze (2007)
- Drifter (2016)
- Drifter (2026)
- Drifters (1929)
- Drifters (2003)
- Drifters (2011)
- Drifters (2015)
- Driftin' River (1946)
- Driftin' Sands (1928)
- Driftin' Thru (1926)
- Drifting Clouds (1996)
- Drifting Detective: Black Wind in the Harbor (1961)
- Drifting Detective: Tragedy in the Red Valley (1961)
- Driftwood: (1928, 1947, 2006 & 2016)
- Drillbit Taylor (2008)
- The Driller Killer (1979)
- Drinking Buddies (2013)
- Drinking Games (2012)
- Drip-Along Daffy (1951)
- Drive: (1997, 2011 & 2019)
- Drive Angry (2011)
- Drive-Away Dolls (2024)
- Drive Me Crazy (1999)
- Drive My Car (2021)
- Drive Thru (2009)
- Drive, He Said (1971)
- Driven: (1916, 1923, 2001 & 2018)
- The Driver (1978)
- Driver's Ed (2026)
- The Driver's Seat (1974)
- Drivers Wanted: (2005 & 2012)
- Driveways (2019)
- Driving Lessons (2006)
- Driving Miss Daisy (1989)

==== Dro ====
- Drohi (1948)
- Drohi (2010)
- Droid (1988)
- Drona (1999)
- Drona (2008)
- Drona (2009)
- Drona (2020)
- Drona 2010 (2010)
- Drone (2014)
- Drone (2017)
- Drones (2010)
- Drones (2013)
- Drool (2009)
- Droopy's Double Trouble (1951)
- Drop (2025)
- The Drop (2014)
- Drop Dead City (2024)
- Drop Dead Darling (1966)
- Drop Dead Fred (1991)
- Drop Dead Gorgeous (1999)
- Drop Dead Sexy (2005)
- The Drop Kick (1927)
- Drop Zone (1994)
- The Drowning (2016)
- Drowning Mona (2000)
- Drowning by Numbers (1988)
- The Drowning Pool (1975)

==== Dru–Dry ====
- Drug Scenes (2000)
- Drugstore Cowboy (1989)
- Drugstore Girl (2003)
- Druids (2001)
- Drum (1976)
- Drum (2004)
- Drum (2016)
- The Drum (1938)
- Drumline (2002)
- Drumline: A New Beat (2014)
- The Drummer (2007)
- Drummer Boy (2026)
- Drummer of Vengeance (1971)
- Drums Along the Mohawk (1939)
- The Drums of Jeopardy: (1923 & 1931)
- Drums of Tahiti (1954)
- Drunk Bus (2020)
- Drunk Stoned Brilliant Dead (2015)
- The Drunkard: (1935, 1937, 1950 & 1953)
- Drunken Angel (1948)
- Drunken Master (1978)
- Drunken Master II (1994)
- Drunken Master III (1994)
- Drunks (1995)
- Dry (2014)
- Dry (2022)
- The Dry (2020)
- Dry Cleaning (1997)
- Dry Day (2023)
- The Dry Land (2010)
- Dry Leaf (2025)
- Dry Martina (2018)
- Dry Martini (1928)
- Dry Rot (1956)
- Dry Season (2006)
- Dry Season (2024)
- Dry Summer (1964)
- Dry and Thirsty (1920)
- A Dry White Season (1989)
- Dry Wind (2020)
- Dry Wood Fierce Fire (2002)

=== Du ===
- Du Barry Was a Lady (1943)

==== Dua–Dum ====
- Dual: (2008 & 2022)
- Duality (2001)
- Dubai (2001)
- Dubček (2018)
- The Duchess (2008)
- Duchess of Idaho (1950)
- Duck (2005)
- Duck Amuck (1953)
- Duck Butter (2018)
- Duck and Cover (1951)
- Duck Dodgers in the 24½th Century (1953)
- Duck Dodgers and the Return of the 24½th Century (1980)
- Duck Duck Goose (2018)
- Duck Pimples (1945)
- Duck Soup: (1927 & 1933)
- Duck Soup to Nuts (1944)
- Duck Ugly (2000)
- Duck! The Carbine High Massacre (1999)
- Duck! Rabbit, Duck! (1953)
- DuckTales the Movie: Treasure of the Lost Lamp (1990)
- Duckweed (2014)
- Duct Tape Forever (2002)
- Dudde Doddappa (1966)
- Dude (2018)
- Dude Bro Party Massacre III (2015)
- Dude Cowboy (1941)
- Dude Duck (1951)
- Dude Ranch (1931)
- Dude - Water Winner (1991)
- Dude, Where's My Car? (2000)
- Dude, Where's the Party? (2003)
- Dudes (1987)
- Dudley Do-Right (1999)
- Duds (1920)
- Dudu, a Human Destiny (1924)
- Due Date (2010)
- Due mafiosi contro Al Capone (1966)
- Due West: Our Sex Journey (2012)
- Duel: (1944, 1957, 1971 & 2004)
- Duel to the Death (1983)
- Duel at Diablo (1966)
- Duel: Final Round (2016)
- Duel at Ganryu Island (1956)
- Duel for Gold (1971)
- Duel at Ichijoji Temple (1955)
- Duel Personalities (1939)
- Duel at the Rio Grande (1963)
- Duel in the Sun (1946)
- The Duellists (1977)
- Duet: (1994, 2006 & 2014)
- Duet for One (1986)
- Duets (2000)
- The DUFF (2015)
- Duffy (1968)
- Duffy's Tavern (1945)
- Dug's Special Mission (2009)
- Dugan of the Badlands (1931)
- Dugo ng Panday (1993)
- Dugo ng Pusakal (1988)
- Dui Diner Duniya (2022)
- Dui Duari (2000)
- Dui Jibon (1988)
- Dui Noyoner Alo (2005)
- Dui Prithibi: (1980, 2010 & 2015)
- Dui Purush: (1945 & 1978)
- Dui Rupaiyan (2017)
- Dujon Dujonar (1999)
- The Duke: (1998, 1999 & 2020)
- The Duke of Burgundy (2014)
- Duke of the Navy (1942)
- The Dukes (2007)
- The Dukes of Hazzard (2005)
- The Dukes of Hazzard: The Beginning (2007) (TV)
- The Dukes of Hazzard: Hazzard in Hollywood (2000) (TV)
- The Dukes of Hazzard: Reunion! (1997) (TV)
- Dukhless 2 (2015)
- Dukun (2018)
- Dulari (1949)
- Dulce familia (2019)
- Dulcima: (1969 TV & 1971)
- Dulcy: (1923 & 1940)
- Dulla Bhatti (2016)
- Duma: (2005 & 2011)
- Dumb & Dumberer: When Harry Met Lloyd (2003)
- Dumb and Dumber (1994)
- Dumb and Dumber To (2014)
- Dumbbells (2014)
- Dumbo: (1941 & 2019)
- Dumm Dumm Dumm (2001)
- Dummy: (1979 TV & 2002)
- The Dummy: (1917 & 1929)
- The Dummy Talks (1943)
- Dumplin' (2018)
- Dumplings (2004)

==== Dun–Duv ====
- Dune: (1984 & 2021)
- The Dune (2013)
- Dune: Part Two (2024)
- Dune: Part Three (2026)
- Dungeons & Dragons series:
  - Dungeons & Dragons (2000)
  - Dungeons & Dragons: Wrath of the Dragon God (2005)
  - Dungeons & Dragons 3: The Book of Vile Darkness (2012)
  - Dungeons & Dragons: Honor Among Thieves (2023)
- Duniya: (1968 & 2007)
- Duniya Diwani (1943)
- Duniya Ek Sarai (1946)
- Duniya Ek Tamasha (1942)
- Dunkirk: (1958 & 2017)
- Dunston Checks In (1996)
- The Dunwich Horror (1970)
- Dünyayı Kurtaran Adam (1982)
- Duo (2006)
- Dupatta (1952)
- Duped Till Doomsday (1957)
- Duplex (2003)
- Duplicate: (1998 & 2009)
- Duplicate Sholay (2002)
- Duplicity (2009)
- Durai (2008)
- Durand of the Bad Lands (1925)
- Durant's Never Closes (2016)
- Durazno (2014)
- Durga: (1974, 1990 & 2002)
- Durga Sohay (2017)
- Durgamati (2020)
- Durgi (2004)
- During One Night (1961)
- Dus Kahaniyaan (2007)
- Dus Lakh (1966)
- Dus Numbri (1976)
- Dus Tola (2010)
- Dusari Goshta (2014)
- Dushasana (2011)
- Dushman: (1939, 1957, 1990 & 1998)
- Dushman Devta (1991)
- Dushman Duniya Ka (1996)
- Dushman Zamana (1992)
- Dushmani: A Violent Love Story (1995)
- Dushmun (1972)
- Dushtaa (2011)
- Dusk to Dawn (1922)
- Dusk for a Hitman (2023)
- Duska (2007)
- Dust: (1985, 2001, 2005, 2009 & 2012)
- Dust of Angels (1992)
- Dust Be My Destiny (1939)
- Dust Bowl Ha! Ha! (2007)
- Dust Bunny (2025)
- Dust Devil (1992)
- Dust to Dust: The Health Effects of 9/11 (2006)
- Dust to Glory (2005)
- Dust of Life (1995)
- Dust Off the Wings (1997)
- Dust in the Sun (1958)
- Dust from Underground (1968)
- Dust in the Wind (1986)
- Dustbin Baby (2008) (TV)
- Dustin (2020)
- Dusty (1983)
- Dutch (1991)
- Dutch (2021)
- Dutchman (1967)
- The Dutchman (2026)
- Duty Free (2020)
- Duvar (1983)

=== Dv–Dz ===
- Dva ohně (1949)
- Dvand: The Internal Conflict (2023)
- Dvořák - In Love? (1988)
- Dwaar (2013)
- Dwandha Yudham (1981)
- Dwando (2009)
- Dwaraka (2017)
- Dweepa (2002)
- Dweepu (1977)
- Dweller (2002)
- Dwellers (2021)
- Dwindle (2021)
- Dwitiyo Purush (2020)
- The Dybbuk (1937)
- Dybt vand (1999)
- Dying to Be Me (2015)
- Dying to Belong (1997 TV)
- Dying Breed (2008)
- Dying Candle (2016)
- Dying to Do Letterman (2011)
- Dying God (2008)
- Dying for Gold (2018)
- Dying at Grace (2003)
- Dying of Laughter (1999)
- Dying of the Light (2014)
- Dying to Live: (2008 & 2018)
- Dying to Remember (1993)
- Dying Room Only (1973 TV)
- Dying to Survive (2018)
- Dying to Tell (2018)
- Dying Young (1991)
- Dykes, Camera, Action! (2018)
- Dylan Dog: Dead of Night (2011)
- Dylan Thomas (1962)
- Dynamite: (1929, 1949 & 2015)
- Dynamite Allen (1921)
- Dynamite Brothers (1974)
- Dynamite Canyon (1941)
- Dynamite Chicken (1972)
- Dynamite Dan (1924)
- Dynamite Denny (1932)
- Dynamite Jack (1961)
- Dynamite Pass (1950)
- Dynamite Ranch (1932)
- Dynamite Smith (1924)
- Dynamite Warrior (2006)
- Dynasty (1976 TV)
- Dynasty Warriors (2021)
- Dzięcioł (1971)

Previous: List of films: C Next: List of films: E

== See also ==
- Lists of films
- Lists of actors
- List of film and television directors
- List of documentary films
- List of film production companies
