= Death Trip =

Death Trip may refer to:

== Film and television ==
- Death Trip (1967 film), part of the Kommissar X series
- "Death Trip", a 1986 episode of American TV series T. J. Hooker (See List of T. J. Hooker episodes)
- Death Trip (2014 film), a Chinese-Thai film directed by Liu Chen and Tian Li
- Death Trip (2015 film), a Chinese film directed by Billy Tang
- Death Trip, a 2015 Malaysian film
- Death Trip, a 2021 horror film

== Music ==
- "Death Trip", a song on 1973 album Raw Power by The Stooges
- "Death Trip", a song on 1973 album The Human Menagerie by Cockney Rebel
- Death Trip, a 1992 album by band Tar Babies
- Death Trip, a 2010 album by band Alien Sex Fiend
- Death Trip, a Finnish band active 1988–94 and from 2012, associated with Läjä Äijälä
