= Drivers Wanted =

Drivers Wanted may refer to:

- Drivers Wanted (2005 film), American 2005 comedy film
- Drivers Wanted (2012 film), American 2012 documentary film
