= Barbara Kowa =

Austrian actress

- Born: March 5, 1973 (age 52); Hanover, Germany
- Occupation: Actress

Barbara Kowa is an Austrian actress. She was born on March 5, 1973, in Hannover, Germany.

Mainly known for her theater work in Germany, France, and Japan, Kowa has also worked in film and television. In 2004 she also worked with director Mike Figgis and starred in the independent thriller Deed Poll. She featured in cult-like roles in two Daryush Shokof films, A2Z, and Breathful, which had an all-women cast.

== Filmography (selected) ==
- Breathful
- A2Z
- Deed Poll
- Torso
- Goodbye Reagan
