= Sammi Rotibi =

American Nigerian actor

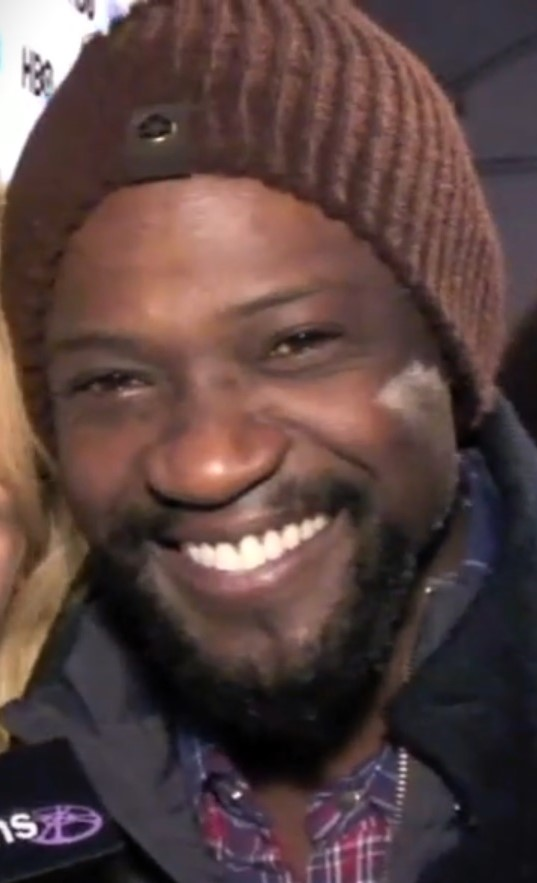
- Rotibi in 2012
- Born: Nigeria
- Occupation: Actor
- Years active: 1997–present

Sammi Rotibi is a Nigerian-American film and television actor. His most notable roles are Rodney in Django Unchained and General Amajagh in Batman v Superman: Dawn of Justice.

== Background ==
Rotibi was born and grew up in Lagos, Nigeria. He attended schools in Nigeria and the US. He is the youngest child of a large family. He decided to become an actor at 18 while working as a part-time bank teller in Miami when a client who owned a talent-agency suggested it as a profession to him.

== Filmography ==
=== Film ===
Year	Title	Role	Notes
1998	Extramarital	Tyrone	
2003	Tears of the Sun	Arthur Azuka	
2003	The Wounded	Noa	Direct-to-video
2005	Lord of War	Andre Baptiste Junior	
2006	Yellow	Red	
2009	Blue	Lamont	
2011	CIS: Las Gidi	Officer Bolaji Ladejo	
2011	Okoto the Messenger	Mr. Reuben	
2011	40-Life	Tourist	
2012	LUV	Jamison	
2012	Maniac	Jason	
2012	The Punisher: Dirty Laundry	Goldtooth	Short
2012	Django Unchained	Rodney	
2014	Cru	Adisa Ewansiha	
2015	Bad Asses on the Bayou	Geoffrey	Direct-to-video
2016	Batman v Superman: Dawn of Justice	General Amajagh	
2016	Broken Vows	Sam	
2016	Blue: The American Dream	Lamont	
2017	Once Upon a Time in Venice	Gigi	
2018	The Darkest Minds	Paul Daly	
2018	El Africano	Aaron Bello	
2019	The Obituary of Tunde Johnson	Adesola Johnson	
2021	The Forbidden Wish	Nate	
2021	The Forever Purge	Darius	
2023	57 Seconds	Calvert	
2026	The Wolf and the Lamb	Solomon 'Sol' Ross	

=== Television ===
Year	Title	Role	Notes
1997, 2003	NYPD Blue	Dele Okafor / Nigerian #1	2 episodes
1998	Always Outnumbered	Marlow Bitta	Television film
2001	The District	Young Officer Noland	Episode: "A Southern Town"
2001	18 Wheels of Justice	Marchand	Episode: "Come Back, Little Diva"
2001	Special Unit 2	Cop #2	Episode: "The Waste"
2001	Son of the Beach	African Worker	Episode: "The Sexorcist"
2001	The Jennie Project	Kwele	Television film
2001	The Invisible Man	Jarod	Episode: "Den of Thieves"
2003	JAG	Louis Clair	Episode: "The One That Got Away"
2004	The Division	Adam Baker	Episode: "That's Them"
2008	CSI: NY	Arthur Bodie	Episode: "Taxi"
2012	The Secret Circle	Eben	6 episodes
2014	Matador	Didi Akinyele	8 episodes
2015	NCIS: New Orleans	Solomon Ekpo	Episode: "My City"
2015	Scorpion	Jonas Madaky	Episode: "US vs. UN vs. UK"
2016–2018	Mars	Robert Foucault	12 episodes
2017	MacGyver	Hasan	Episode: "Screwdriver"
2017	The Blacklist	Geoffroy Keino	Episode: "The Forecaster (No. 163)"
2019	Chicago P.D.	Marcus West	Episode: "False Positive"
2021	The Lost Symbol	Agent Adamu	Episode: "Pilot"
