= The Punisher: Dirty Laundry =

- Promo poster
- Directed by: Phil Joanou
- Written by: Chad St. John
- Story by: Adi Shankar; Thomas Jane; Chad St. John
- Based on: The Punisher by Gerry Conway; Ross Andru; John Romita, Sr.
- Produced by: Adi Shankar
- Starring: Thomas Jane; Ron Perlman; Shannon Collis; Jack Goldenberg; Sammi Rotibi; Brandee Steger; Karlin Walker
- Cinematography: Masanobu Takayanagi
- Edited by: Paul Norling
- Music by: Hans Zimmer; James Newton Howard; (The Dark Knight soundtrack)
- Production companies: 1984 Private Defense Contractors; RAW Studios
- Release date: July 15, 2012
- Running time: 10 minutes
- Country: United States
- Language: English

The Punisher: Dirty Laundry, also known simply as Dirty Laundry (stylized as #DIRTYLAUNDRY), is a 2012 American vigilante action fan film based on the Marvel Comics anti-hero the Punisher, starring Thomas Jane (reprising the title role from the 2004 film The Punisher) and Ron Perlman, produced by Adi Shankar and directed by Phil Joanou. The film was first screened at the 2012 San Diego Comic-Con.

== Plot ==
In a run-down neighborhood, Frank Castle wakes up and exits his van to get his laundry done. On his way to the coin-op laundromat, he witnesses a street gang stop and confront three prostitutes before Goldtooth, the gang leader, takes one of them to a back alley where he beats and rapes her. Despite hearing her screams from a distance, Frank minds his business and places his laundry in a washing machine.

Minutes later, a boy named DeShawn crosses through the neighborhood and is harassed by the gang while Goldtooth offers him an opportunity to sell drugs for them. When DeShawn refuses, the gang members begin to mug him. After a brief verbal confrontation with Goldtooth, Frank walks to a liquor store across the street to get a bottle of Yoo-hoo. There, a handicapped store clerk named Big Mike tells him that two years ago, he witnessed a similar situation and insinuates that he wound up crippled for confronting the criminals.

Frank pays for the Yoo-hoo and also buys a bottle of Jack Daniel's, which he uses to club some of the gang members to death, while killing others with their own guns and knives. He then breaks Goldtooth's right arm and both legs before asking him if he knows what the difference between justice and punishment is, while pouring the whiskey on him. Frank pulls out a lighter, and places it on the ground before returning to the laundromat.

The battered prostitute returns to the scene to pick up the lighter and sets the gang leader on fire as Frank walks back to his van with his laundry. DeShawn approaches him to return a T-shirt he dropped, but Frank tells him to keep it. As Frank drives off, the boy unfolds the shirt to reveal the Punisher symbol.

== Cast ==
- Thomas Jane as Frank Castle / The Punisher
- Ron Perlman as Big Mike
- Sammi Rotibi as Goldtooth
- Karlin Walker as DeShawn
- Brandee Tucker as The Girl
- Jack Goldenberg as The Doorman
- Shannon Collis as Hooker #1

== Production ==
The film is the first medium to reveal a new Punisher logo designed by Tim Bradstreet. Thomas Jane screened the film at the RAW Studios panel at the 2012 San Diego Comic-Con. In explaining the reason for this project, he posted this quote on YouTube:

I wanted to make a fan film for a character I've always loved and believed in - a love letter to Frank Castle & his fans. It was an incredible experience with everyone on the project throwing in their time just for the fun of it. It's been a blast to be a part of from start to finish; we hope the friends of Frank enjoy watching it as much as we did making it.

== Reception ==
Ivan Kander of Shortoftheweek.com called the film a "love letter" to the Punisher character and a success. He also stated that the film "proves that fan films aren't just for crazed geeks running around with their home video cameras anymore". He did criticise the films for having a rather thin plot and predictable outcome for the villain but praised the production value.

Kyle Anderson of The Nerdist stated that the film was worth watching and stated that Jane should reprise the role of the Punisher again if another theatrical film was to be made.

Chris Sims of ComicsAlliance expressed that the film was interesting in that it showed the main character in a transitioning period between that of the 2004 Punisher film and how the character is portrayed in the comic books as the Punisher in the 2004 film was more concerned with getting revenge as opposed to waging a war on crime.

Brad Brevet of Comingsoon.net criticized the use of Hans Zimmer's and James Newton Howard's The Dark Knight score, especially in the opening moments when the film's antagonist appears with music playing from his car stereo, but stated that the short was otherwise solid.

At the time of its release Followingthenerd.com described the film as "arguably the best 10 minutes of screen time The Punisher has ever had".

Jon Bernthal, who portrays Frank Castle / The Punisher in the Marvel Cinematic Universe, has stated that he took Jane's performance in the short as inspiration.

== Sequel ==
In an interview with Inverse Adi Shankar revealed that he was previously in pre-production on a sequel to Dirty Laundry, stating that the film was "going to be a two-hander that introduced the 'Lady Punisher', who was going to be played by MMA fighter and Deadpool actress Gina Carano.

Thomas Jane was due to reprise his role in the sequel, and the script was written by Wayne Kramer. Shankar stated in the interview (regarding the film) that: "it may still be revisited and revived at some point down the road, and that it shouldn't be ruled out just yet."

== Accolades ==
The film was nominated for a Webby Award for the category Online Film & Video, Drama: Long Form or Series and was listed on Collider's Top 5 Surprises of 2012.

In 2016 ScreenGeek.net named the film the number one fan film based on comics and stated that the film revolutionized the world of the fan film community.

== See also ==
- Punisher in film
- Punisher in television
- Do Not Fall in New York City, another Punisher fan film
