= DoYouThinkIAmSexy? =

2022 Filipino film by Dennis Marasigan

DoYouThinkIAmSEXY?
- Directed by: Dennis Marasigan
- Written by: Dennis Marasigan
- Produced by: Vicente del Rosario Jr
- Starring: Cloe Barreto; Marco Gomez; Chloe Jenna
- Cinematography: Nor Domingo
- Edited by: Aaron Alegre
- Music by: Jesse Lucas
- Production company: Great Media Productions
- Distributed by: Viva Films
- Release date: September 9, 2022
- Running time: 116 minutes
- Country: Philippines
- Language: Filipino

#DoYouThinkIAmSEXY? is a 2022 Filipino drama thriller film written and directed by Dennis Marasigan. Produced under Great Media Productions and distributed by Viva Films, it features Cloe Barreto, Marco Gomez and Chloe Jenna. The film premiered on September 9, 2022, on Vivamax.

== Cast ==
- Cloe Barreto as Charlize/Elle
- Marco Gomez as Trystan
- Chloe Jenna as Harriet
- Ava Mendez as Freya
- Milana Ikemoto as Yumi
- Hershie de Leon as Irene
- Dolly de Leon as Prof. Angela Allado

== Production ==
The film was announced by Viva Films. Cloe Barreto and Marco Gomez were reportedly cast to appear marking their second collaboration after Silab (2021). Principal photography of the film commenced in June 2022 and concluded in August 2022.

== Music ==
DoYouThinkIAmSEXY?

Soundtrack album by Pop Girls
- Released: September 9, 2022
- Genre: Soundtrack
- Length: 3:16
- Language: Tagalog
- Label: Viva Records

The soundtrack for #DoYouThinkIAmSEXY? is composed by Pop Girls.

Tracklisting
No.	Title	Length
1.	"Prinsesa"	3:16
Total length:		3:16

== Release ==
The press conference took place at the Gateway Cineplex in Quezon City on September 7, 2022.

The film was made available to stream exclusively on Vivamax on September 9, 2022.

== Reception ==
A critic from The A.V. Club reviewed the film.
