= The Dragon, the Young Master =

The Dragon, The Young Master 勇立忍者
- Film poster under the title The Deadly Silver Ninja
- Directed by: Kim Shi-hyeon; Godfrey Ho
- Written by: Kim Shi-hyeon
- Produced by: Tomas Tang; Joseph Lai
- Starring: Dragon Lee; Yuen Qiu; Kim Ki Joo
- Edited by: Vincent Leung
- Distributed by: Jia's Motion Picture Ltd. (Hong Kong); IFD Films and Arts (International); Asso Asia Films (Taiwan); Silverstein Films Ltd. (US)
- Release date: 4 April 1978 (South Korea)
- Running time: 83 minutes
- Countries: South Korea; Hong Kong
- Languages: Mandarin (Taiwan); Cantonese (Hong Kong); Korean (South Korea)

The Dragon, The Young Master is a 1978 kung fu comedy film directed by Kim Shi-hyeon and Godfrey Ho, and starring Dragon Lee and Yuen Qiu. It was distributed in America in 1982 and is also known by other English titles, including The Deadly Silver Ninja.

== Plot ==
Pai Wu Lang, disguised as the "Silver Ninja", arrives in a Manchurian mining town seeking his father's killer. His search is complicated by a cache of jewels, the reward of a spy for Japan, buried somewhere on the mountain. He saves a flower seller, Xue Hua, and her blind father from government thugs, then discovers that the old man caused his father's death—accidentally. When Xue's father is himself murdered, she and Pai join forces to clean up the town.

== Cast ==
- Dragon Lee as Pai Wu Lang
- Yuen Qiu as Xue Hua
- Kim Ki Joo
- Lee Ye Min as blind old man
- Choi Min Kyu
- Baek Hwang Gi
- Chiang Tao
- Liu Jun Kuk
- Han Ying Chieh
- Han Quo Yen
- Lee Suk Koo
- Li Chun (extra)

== Production ==
The movie was produced by the Hong Kong "Jia's Motion Picture Company". Besides Joseph Lai and Tomas Tang, Godfrey Ho (uncredited in the movie) was also involved in the low-budget production.
