= Deed Poll (film) =

2004 short film directed by Ingo J. Biermann

- Directed by: Ingo J. Biermann
- Written by: André Schneider
- Story by: David Ginever
- Produced by: Ingo J. Biermann; André Schneider
- Starring: Barbara Kowa; Rainer-Maria Wittenauer; André Schneider; Gianni Meurer; Martina Schaak
- Cinematography: Steffen Ritter
- Edited by: Christine Denck
- Release dates: 5 December 2004 (Berlin); 29 March 2005 (London)
- Running time: 41 minutes
- Country: Germany
- Language: English

Deed Poll is a 2004 German erotic thriller short film directed by Ingo J. Biermann. The film stars Barbara Kowa, Rainer-Maria Wittenauer, André Schneider, Gianni Meurer, and Martina Schaak.

== Plot ==
Deed Poll tells the story of Ivy and Sean Poll, rich siblings and lovers. After Ivy has killed both their parents, they start kicking in the high gear on their inherited property. They hire a callboy, Nathaniel, to share their sexual fantasies, and their passion for drugs and cards. One night, Nathaniel has brought his mute brother Thor for a foursome, Ivy expresses her wish to have a new set of cards, handmade out of human skin. Nathaniel, on ecstasy, offers his skin and watches the Polls and his brother playing cards with it while he is dying.

== Cast ==
- Barbara Kowa as Ivy Poll
- Rainer-Maria Wittenauer as Sean Poll
- André Schneider as Nathaniel Griffin
- Gianni Meurer as Thor Griffin
- Martina Schaak as Dr. Leitziger
