= Duty Free (film) =

2020 documentary film

Duty Free is a 2020 documentary film directed by Sian-Pierre Regis. The film tells the story of a 75-year-old woman who has recently been fired from her job at a hotel. Her son, who is also the director of the film, assists her with finding a new job and takes her on bucket list trips in order to do the things she could not do due to her duties at work and at home.

On the review aggregator website Rotten Tomatoes, the film has an approval rating of 79% based on 14 reviews, with an average rating of 6.10/10.
