= Dr. Mekam =

2018 Nigerian Comedy-Drama film

- Directed by: Ike Nnaebue
- Produced by: Oby Olebara Uzoukwu
- Starring: Uche Jombo; Kalu Ikeagwu; Seun Akindele; Yemi Blaq; Zack Orji; Oby Olebara Uzoukwu; Eva Appiah; Gloria Anozie-Young
- Music by: Zuka 2Sec
- Production company: Obylicious Empire Studio
- Release date: 2018
- Running time: 118 minutes
- Country: Nigeria
- Language: English

Dr. Mekam is a 2018 Nollywood movie directed by Ike Nnaebue, co-produced by Oby Olebara Uzoukwu and Phil Erabie .

== Plot ==
The story is of a Doctor called Dr. Mekam who returns home from abroad after service as a doctor. He comes back to Nigeria to become the president but later realises that the path to take to become a president is not an easy one.

== Cast ==
Cast list

- Uche Jombo
- Kalu Ikeagwu
- Seun Akindele
- Yemi Blaq
- Oby Olebara Uzoukwu
- Gloria Anozieyoung
- Chika Chukwu
- Emeka Okoye
- Eric Obinna
- Eva Appiah
