= Matthew Ehlers =

American film director

Matthew Ehlers is an American film director, producer, and screenwriter.

Matthew Ehlers began his professional film making career shortly after graduating USC Cinema with his anti-smoking commercial for the American Cancer Society, "Cancel Your Reservations Now", which was seen in over 52 television markets throughout the US. He also directed Philip Seymour Hoffman in a public service announcement for The Shipping Dock Theatre.

In 1999 he released The Alibi, a twelve-minute comedy short. The film was seen in 15 festivals worldwide and was seen on HBO. His next short, Lunch, was an official selection of the 2002 Sundance Film Festival as well as SXSW. It has been shown on HBO, IFC as well as The Sundance Channel. His next short, Autobank, was also accepted into Sundance as well as 30 other festivals and was broadcast on Comedy Central. His follow-up short, "Who’s Your Daddy?", became Ehlers's third straight film to be accepted at the Sundance Film Festival and was also seen on Comedy Central.

Following Sundance, Ehlers was commissioned by Made Up North Productions in Manchester, UK to write the screenplay for their feature project, Jump. He is also developing other feature film projects with Made Up North Productions’ Michael Knowles. His first feature film, Smoking Laws, premiered at the High Falls Film Festival and is being distributed by PUSH Worldwide. In 2002 Matthew was one of five final contestants in the Chrysler Hypnotic Million Dollar Film Festival. The contest involved creating short content at both the Cannes Film Festival & Universal Studios. Matthew directed the Comedy Central webseries Cappers, which was co-written with Nick Kroll & John Mulaney. An episode of which aired on Comedy Central's show, AtomTV.

His commercial directing credits include work for such companies as Birkenstock, Verizon & the Hard Rock Cafe.
