= Drivers Wanted (2005 film) =

- Directed by: T. Lee Beideck
- Written by: T. Lee Beideck
- Produced by: T. Lee Beideck
- Starring: David Sirk; Amaury Batista; Dave Spiecher; Brian Osborne; T. Lee Beideck
- Cinematography: Matthew Ehlers
- Music by: Burning Snella
- Distributed by: Pillen's Farm Pictures
- Release date: 2005
- Running time: 94 minutes
- Country: United States
- Language: English

Drivers Wanted is a 2005 comedy film written, directed and produced by T. Lee Beideck. Beideck also stars in the film, along with David Sirk, Amaury Batista, Dave Spiecher and Brian Osborne.

The plot is centered on the pizza delivery drivers for a small town pizza shop.

== See also ==
- List of American films of 2005
- Pizza delivery in popular culture
