= Demain à Nanguila =

Demain à Nanguila (Nanguila Tomorrow)
- Directed by: Joris Ivens
- Screenplay by: Catherine Varlin
- Produced by: Société Franco-Africaine de Cinéma
- Starring: Sidibé Moussa
- Cinematography: Louis Miaille Pierre Guéguen
- Edited by: Gisèle Chézeau Hélène Arnal Suzanne Baron
- Music by: Louis Bessières Sidibé Moussa
- Release date: 1969
- Running time: 50 minutes
- Country: Mali

Demain à Nanguila (or Nanguila Tomorrow) is a 1969 Malian film.

== Synopsis ==
Nanguila Tomorrow follows the steps of a young Malian man while illustrating the detrimental effects of rural exodus. The film also questions the government's decisions immediately after obtaining independence in its attempt to put a stop to the wave of people immigrating to the cities and to develop the country based on agriculture. A portrait of Mali in the 1960s by means of the nightlife in Bamako, the capital's monuments, and women bent under the weight of too many tasks, Nanguila Tomorrow is regarded as the first Malian film.
