= Do It for Johnny =

Do It For Johnny
- Directed by: Haylar Garcia
- Written by: Haylar Garcia
- Produced by: Scott Baxendale; Haylar Garcia; Tarik Heitmann; Page Ostrow; Darcy Grabowsk
- Starring: Haylar Garcia; Scott Baxendale
- Cinematography: Jeff Deel
- Edited by: Haylar Garcia
- Music by: Scott Baxendale; Daddy Bruce Lee
- Production company: Tao Engine Philms
- Release date: January 28, 2007 (Santa Barbara International Film Festival)
- Running time: 105 minutes
- Country: United States
- Language: English

Do It For Johnny is a 2007 documentary film developed by Haylar Garcia and Scott Baxendale, and directed by Garcia about how a group of indie filmmakers try to get Johnny Depp to support their unknown and unfunded screenplay "Narcophonic".

== Development ==
In 2002, Colorado filmmakers/musicians Haylar Garcia and Scott Baxendale began work on a screenplay called "Narcophonic", which takes place over a 30-year period in Rock & Roll history, and chronicles the true-life events of Scott Baxendale's life as a guitar maker. Baxendale and Garcia began the search for an actor to play the film's lead, eventually settling on Johnny Depp. As the fourth draft of the script became finalized in late 2004, Garcia and Baxendale decided to show Depp Baxendale's craftmanship by giving the actor one of his guitars. Over the course of the next few months, Baxendale built a custom design, solid-body electric guitar for Depp. In the rear of the instrument he built a special chamber, meant to house and display the film script. But then arose another problem—how to deliver the guitar to Depp.

== Synopsis ==
With the help of their indie production team and Johnny Depp fans around the world, Garcia and Baxendale chronicle their quest to hand deliver the guitar and script to Johnny Depp, all the while filming their journey.

== Cast ==
- Haylar Garcia as himself
- Scott Baxendale as himself
- Darcy Grabowski as herself
- Jeff Deel as himself
- Damon Scott as himself

== Production ==
Portions of this documentary were filmed in Denver, Colorado, Dallas, Texas, and Los Angeles, California.

== Reception ==
When the film debuted at the Santa Barbara International Film Festival, Variety referred to it as a "notable premiere".

=== Awards and nominations ===
The film won "best documentary" at the 2007 Rainier Independent Film Festival.
