= The Death of Snow White =

- Theatrical release poster
- Directed by: Jason Brooks
- Written by: Jason Brooks; Naomi Mechem-Miller
- Based on: Snow White by Brothers Grimm
- Produced by: Randy Brians; Jason Brooks; Charles L. Bunce; Kayli Fortun; Sharif Ibrahim; Kyrie Jackson; Eric Michael Kochmer; Jordan Logan; Naomi Mechem-Miller; Kody Newton
- Starring: Sanae Loutsis; Chelsea Edmundson; Tristan Nokes; Meredith Binder; Risa Mei; Jeremy Hallum; Ali Chapman; Colin Miller; Dillon Moore; Michael DeSanto II; Eric Pope
- Cinematography: Kody Newton
- Edited by: Jason Brooks
- Music by: Andrew Scott Bell
- Production companies: STL Productions; Real Fiction Studios; Newton to Newton Productions
- Distributed by: Atlas Distribution; The Horror Collective
- Release dates: March 21, 2025 (Los Angeles); May 2, 2025 (United States)
- Running time: 110 minutes
- Country: United States
- Language: English
- Box office: $108,752

The Death of Snow White is a 2025 American dark fantasy action horror film directed, written, and produced by Jason Brooks. The film is a horror reimaging of Snow White, and stars Sanae Loutsis, Chelsea Edmundson, Tristan Nokes, Meredith Binder, Risa Mei, Jeremy Hallum, Ali Chapman, Colin Miller, Dillon Moore, Michael DeSanto II, and Eric Pope.

The film premiered at Los Angeles on March 21, 2025, and was released in the United States on May 2, 2025.

== Plot ==
Centuries ago, an evil witch infiltrates a royal castle with the help of a treacherous huntsman named Kaiser. She murders the guards and poisons the pregnant queen with a cursed blade. Although the king's loyal huntsman, Gunnar, and the castle healers attempt to save her, the poison proves fatal. Before dying, the queen gives birth to a daughter with skin as white as snow, naming her Snow White. She entrusts Gunnar with protecting and raising the child. Meanwhile, the witch continues slaughtering the castle's defenders before escaping into the night.

Fifteen or sixteen years later, Snow White grows into a beautiful, kind-hearted princess who enjoys spending time with the common people. She frequently helps villagers and those in need. She also secretly loves Prince Florizel, a prince from a neighboring kingdom, who returns her feelings. Encouraged by her friends, Snow White eventually confesses her affection to him, and the two begin a romance. However, Snow White's happiness is threatened by her stepmother, the Evil Queen, who despises her beauty and popularity. Obsessed with maintaining her appearance and power, the Queen practices dark magic and conducts horrific experiments on innocent women. She also possesses a Magic Mirror that feeds her vanity and encourages her cruelty. Meanwhile, she orders her huntsman to capture one of Snow White's closest friends for another experiment. During an attack on Snow White's friends, Kaiser reveals that the Queen intends to kill Snow White, who was never supposed to survive the night of her birth. Snow White and Florizel escape the huntsmen, but Snow White becomes separated from him and flees into the forest with a friend. There, she reunites with Gunnar, who gives her an ancient dagger made from dwarf bone that once belongs to her father. When Florizel seeks the Queen's assistance, she refuses and orders Gunnar to bring Snow White back alive, considering her a threat to her throne.

Deep within the forest, Snow White and her companion encounter monstrous creatures that devour her friend. However, the creatures retreat upon recognizing the ancient dagger Snow White carries. Meanwhile, Florizel gathers his followers and enters the forest to search for her. Snow White eventually encounters royal guards, who capture her, but six dwarfs and a giant rescue her and take her to their hidden home. Their leader, Dozer, recognizes her dagger as belonging to her father. A healer named Asta then tells Snow White the truth about her mother's death, and the dwarfs also explain that they once lived in Snow White's kingdom but were imprisoned, tortured, and killed after the witch seized the throne. The survivors escaped into the forest and established a hidden community. Snow White gradually earns their trust through her kindness.

Meanwhile, the Queen discovers that Snow White possesses a pure soul and an inner light that she can never obtain herself. Believing that taking Snow White's blood, beauty, and life will grant her ultimate power, the Queen prepares a poisoned apple using the belongings of Snow White's murdered friend. She also reveals her true identity as the same witch who attacked the royal castle on the night of Snow White's birth. Disguised as an old woman, the witch enters the forest and discovers Snow White's whereabouts from a lost child, whom she subsequently murders. She then arrives at the dwarfs' cottage and tricks Snow White into accepting the poisoned apple. When Snow White refuses it, the witch forces it into her mouth, causing her to collapse into an enchanted sleep. The witch abducts her, while Florizel and the dwarfs discover that she is missing. The dwarfs later reveal that Snow White's mother originally sacrificed her own life to save her daughter from the same deadly poison that threatens her now. Meanwhile, the Queen continues murdering innocent women and stealing their beauty to preserve her appearance. Her obsession becomes increasingly grotesque as she mutilates herself and harvests body parts from her victims in an attempt to resemble Snow White. The Magic Mirror eventually tells her that consuming Snow White's heart will grant her eternal youth, beauty, and power.

Determined to rescue Snow White, Dozer and the surviving dwarfs storm the castle alongside Florizel and his followers. During the battle, Tiny the giant is killed, while another dwarf sacrifices himself to protect Snow White from the Queen's attack. The Queen subsequently casts a spell that renders the dwarfs powerless within the castle. Taking advantage of the chaos, Florizel rescues Snow White and carries her to the secluded place where they previously confess their feelings. He awakens her with a kiss, transferring the antidote into her body at the cost of his own life. Snow White regains consciousness, but Florizel dies from the sacrifice. After defending herself against a huntsman who attempts to kill her, Snow White returns to the castle to confront the Queen. She offers her heart in exchange for an end to the bloodshed, but Gunnar intervenes and pretends to stab her. He presents the Queen with what appears to be Snow White's heart, which she immediately consumes. However, Gunnar actually tricks her by disguising the poisoned apple as the heart. Realizing the deception, the furious Queen kills him. As the witch prepares to attack Snow White, Pollen holds the Magic Mirror in front of her, causing her spell to rebound. The dwarfs restrain the weakened witch and strip her of her magical powers. Snow White confronts her, declaring that true beauty comes from within and that the Queen will never possess it. Even the Magic Mirror turns against its former mistress, mocking her downfall. Powerless and defeated, the witch fades away.

With the Queen's defeat, Snow White is crowned the new ruler of the kingdom, restoring peace and harmony. However, she continues visiting Florizel's resting place, remembering the prince who sacrificed his life to save hers.

== Cast ==
- Sanae Loutsis as Snow White
- Chelsea Edmundson as the Evil Queen
- Tristan Nokes as Prince Florizel
- Meredith Binder as the Evil Witch
- Risa Mei as Pollen
- Jeremy Hallum as Dozer
- Ali Chapman as Arsta
- Colin Miller as Beau
- Dillon Moore as Sunny
- Michael DeSanto II as Grimwald
- Eric Pope as Tiny
- Kelly Tappan as the Queen
- Tyler McKenna as the King
- Jason Brooks as Huntsman Gunnar
- Milo Mechem-Miller as Wilhelm
- Christopher Burnside as Jacob
- Hailey Stubblefield as Inga
- Lydia Pearl Pentz as Sophia
- Holland Stull as Yvonne
- Jonathan Holbrook as Huntsman Kaiser
- Carl Covington as Huntsman Beckett
- Charles Lawson as Huntsman MacQuoid
- Thomas Marshall as Huntsman Wallace
- Jason Reynolds as Huntsman Merek

== Production ==
=== Pre-production ===
In January 2024, the film was announced to be in pre-production.

=== Filming ===
Filming took place in Woodinville, Washington from June to August 2024, and Idaho around August.

== Release ==
The film had its world premiere at Los Angeles on March 21, 2025, and was released in the United States on May 2, 2025. The film was originally set to be released theatrically in March 2025 and April 18.

== See also ==
- List of films about witchcraft
