= La donna di notte =

- Directed by: Mino Loy
- Release date: 6 November 1962 (UK)
- Country: Italy
- Language: Italian

La donna di notte is a 1962 Italian film directed by Mino Loy.
