= Didgori: Land of Sacrificed Knights =

- Directed by: Nikoloz Khomasuridze
- Produced by: Nikoloz Bartkulashvili
- Starring: Elgudzha Burduli; Nevin Millan; Mika Sakvarelidze; Wil Wesley; Drew Taylor; Givi Chuguashvili; Valeri Korshia
- Cinematography: Megan Woeppel
- Edited by: Irakli Dolidze, Lasha Efremidze, Nevin Millan
- Music by: David Porchkhidze
- Distributed by: Republic of Georgia
- Release date: June 2009
- Running time: 35 minutes
- Country: Georgia
- Language: Georgian

Didgori: Land of Sacrificed Knights is a 2009 historical film directed by Nikoloz Khomasuridze. The film was produced by Nikoloz Bartkulashvili and has cinematography by Megan Woeppel and music by David Porchkhidze. The film's art director was Laura A. Garcia with film editing credits belonging to Irakli Dolidze, Lasha Efremidze, Nevin Millan and the director himself.

== Plot ==
Set in Kingdom of Georgia in the early 12th century, the film centers on the Battle of Didgori (1121), in which the Kingdom of Georgia was victorious against the Great Seljuk Empire, allowing the Georgians to cease paying tributes and reclaim Tbilisi.

== Cast ==
- Elgudzha Burduli as David IV of Georgia
- Nevin Millan as Hugues de Payens
- Mika Sakvarelidze as Godfrey de Saint-Omer
- Wil Wesley as Walter Gauthier
- Drew Taylor as Baldwin II of Jerusalem
- Givi Chuguashvili as Ilghazi
- Valeri Korshia as Mahmud II of Great Seljuq
- Kylie Clay as Sophie
- Gega Choquri as Blacksmith Shamshe
- Imeda Arabuli as Imeda - Sacrificed Knight
- David Chalatashvili as Nikoloz - Sacrificed Knight
- Irakli Cholokashvili as Demetre I of Georgia
- Levan Khurtsia as David IV's guard
- Paata Mkheidze as David IV's guard

== See also ==
- List of historical drama films
