= Do Not Fall in New York City =

- Poster for the film.
- Directed by: Luis Pelayo Junquera
- Written by: Comic Book: Garth Ennis; Screenplay: Luis Pelayo Junquera
- Based on: The Punisher (vol. 6) by Garth Ennis
- Produced by: Luis Pelayo Junquera
- Starring: Lee Westwood; Andrés Barriales; Alvaro Gomez; Enol Junquera; Victor Maeso; Victor Muina; Diego Sastre; Valentina Sosa; Pablo Viejo
- Edited by: Luis Pelayo Junquera
- Music by: El Gordo del Funk
- Distributed by: YouTube
- Release date: September 11, 2012 (Spain)
- Running time: 7:36
- Country: Spain
- Languages: English; Spanish

Do Not Fall in New York City is a 2012 animated short fan film about the Marvel Comics character the Punisher. It is based on the 32-page one-issue storyline "Do Not Fall in New York City" from November 2001 written by Garth Ennis and drawn by Steve Dillon.

== Production ==
The film was produced and animated by a sole individual, Luis Pelayo Junquera. It was made in Spain, and a Spanish-language version was released at the same time as the English-language version.

== Plot ==
Joe, an old Vietnam War veteran and friend of Frank Castle, has murdered his wife after a mental breakdown. He is now on the run from the police as well as the Punisher, the man who Frank Castle now is.

The story then focuses on the Punisher looking for him while having flashbacks to Vietnam; the flashback shows that Joe once saved a young Castle's life and told Frank that he does not need to worry because he caught him when he fell. Joe takes shelter in a restaurant and eventually takes a pregnant waitress hostage. After dragging her outside with him, he begins mumbling about his wife and child; while having a moment of clarity, he throws his gun away and tells the waitress to go away.

He turns around and sees the Punisher, mumbling "Frank?" seconds before the Punisher shoots him in the head. As he falls, the Punisher grabs him before his body lands on the ground and whispers "it's OK Joe, I caught you."

== Reception ==
Mark Zambrano of Screen Rant ranked the film as the fourth best ever interpretation of the Punisher on screen. He also stated that, while Junquera's take on the character lacks the big scale action or refined look of other screen iterations, it still does a commendable job of tackling the dark, psychological side of the character like few other works. He finished with saying "with a captivating mix of animation styles and a freedom for storytelling not allowed by studio produced mega-projects, Do Not Fall in New York City is requisite viewing for any fan of the comics. For many it ranks as a worthy entry in the Punisher's best cinematic achievements." Earnest Cavalli of Digitaltrends stated that the film was better than any of the three live action Punisher films that had been produced at the time of the film's release.
