= Death Trip (2014 film) =

- Directed by: Liu Chen; Tian Li
- Release date: December 26, 2014 (China)
- Running time: 86 minutes
- Countries: China; Thailand
- Language: Mandarin
- Box office: ¥1.27 million (China)

Death Trip (Chinese: 还魂之迷失曼谷) is a 2014 Chinese-Thai suspense thriller film directed by Liu Chen and Tian Li. It was released on December 26.

== Cast ==
- Van Fan
- Li Xinyun
- Li Yuan
- Xue Cun

== Reception ==
By December 26, 2014, the film had earned ¥1.27 million at the Chinese box office.
