= Sarat Chandra Chattopadhyay filmography =

Sarat Chandra Chattopadhyay, alternatively spelt as Sarat Chandra Chatterjee (15 September 1876 – 16 January 1938), was a Bengali novelist and short story writer of the early 20th century. Most of his works deal with the lifestyle, tragedy and struggle of the village people and the contemporary social practices that prevailed in Bengal. He remains the most popular, translated, and adapted Indian author of all time. His novels have been made into more than 40 films. The following is a list of films made on Sarat Chandra Chattopadhyay's novels or stories:

== Films ==
Key
| † | Denotes films that have not yet been released |

=== As writer ===
| Year | Film | Language | Country | Adapted from |
|---|---|---|---|---|
| 1928 | Devdas (1928 film) | Bengali | India | Devdas |
| 1935 | Devdas (1935 film) | Bengali | India | Devdas |
| 1936 | Devdas (1936 film) | Hindi | India | Devdas |
| 1937 | Devdas (1937 film) | Assamese | India | Devdas |
| 1942 | Parineeta (1942 film) | Bengali | India | Parineeta |
| 1947 | Pather Dabi | Bengali | India | Pather Dabi |
| 1947 | Ramer Sumati | Bengali | India | Ramer Sumati |
| 1948 | Sabyasachi | Hindi | India | Pather Dabi |
| 1950 | Mej Didi | Bengali | India | "Mejdidi" (short story) |
| 1951 | Datta | Bengali | India | Datta |
| 1952 | Bindur Chhele | Bengali | India | Bindur Chhele |
| 1953 | Devdas (1953 film) | Telugu/Tamil (bilingual) | India | Devdas |
| 1953 | Parineeta (1953 film) | Hindi | India | Parineeta |
| 1954 | Biraj Bahu | Hindi | India | Biraj Bou |
| 1955 | Devdas (1955 film) | Hindi | India | Devdas |
| 1957 | Bardidi | Bengali | India | Borodidi |
| 1958 | Manamalai | Tamil | India | Parineeta |
| 1958 | Rajlakshmi O Srikanta | Bengali | India | Srikant |
| 1959 | Indranath Srikanta O Annadadidi | Bengali | India | Srikant |
| 1961 | Batasari | Telugu | India | Borodidi |
| 1961 | Kaanal Neer | Tamil | | Borodidi |
| 1965 | Devdas (1965 film) | Urdu | Pakistan | Devdas |
| 1966 | Ramer Sumati | Bengali | India | Ramer Sumati |
| 1967 | Majhli Didi | Hindi | India | "Mejdidi" (short story) |
| 1969 | Kamallata | Bengali | India | Srikant |
| 1969 | Parineeta (1969 film) | Bengali | India | Parineeta |
| 1971 | Chhoti Bahu | Hindi | India | Bindur Chhele |
| 1973 | Bindur Chhele | Bengali | India | Bindur Chhele |
| 1974 | Devdas (1974 film) | Telugu | India | Devdas |
| 1975 | Khushboo | Hindi | India | Pandit Moshai |
| 1976 | Datta | Bengali | India | Datta |
| 1976 | Sankoch | Hindi | India | Parineeta |
| 1977 | Sabyasachi | Bengali | India | Pather Dabi |
| 1977 | Swami | Hindi | India | Swami |
| 1979 | Devdas (1979 film) | Bengali | India | Devdas |
| 1980 | Apne Paraye | Hindi | Nishkriti | |
| 1982 | Devdas (1982 film) | Bengali | Bangladesh | Devdas |
| 1985 | Ramer Sumati | Bengali | Bangladesh | Ramer Sumati |
| 1986 | Parineeta (1986 film) | Bengali | Bangladesh | Parineeta |
| 1987 | Rajlakshmi Srikanta | Bengali | Bangladesh | Srikant |
| 2002 | Devdas | Hindi | India | Devdas |
| 2002 | Devdas | Hindi | India | Devdas |
| 2003 | Mej Didi | Bengali | India | "Mejdidi" (short story) |
| 2004 | Iti Srikanta | Bengali | India | Srikant |
| 2005 | Parineeta (2005 film) | Hindi | India | Parineeta |
| 2009 | Dev.D | Hindi | India | Devdas |
| 2013 | Devdas (2013 film) | Bengali | Bangladesh | Devdas |
| 2014 | Aalo Chhaya | Bengali | India | Aalo Chhaya |
| 2018 | Daas Dev | Hindi | India | Devdas |
| 2019 | Rajlokkhi O Srikanto | Bengali | India | Srikant |
| 2021 | Riding on the Moon Boat | Bengali | India | Mahesh |
| 2023 | Datta | Bengali | India | Datta |
| 2026 | Emperor vs Sarat Chandra | Bengali | India | Pather Dabi |

== Web Series and Television Shows ==
Key
| † | Denotes films that have not yet been released |

=== As writer ===
| Year | Film | Language | Country | Adapted from |
|---|---|---|---|---|
| 1982 | Charitraheen | Hindi | India | Choritrohin |
| 1985–86 | Srikant | Hindi | India | Srikanta |
| 2018–present | Choritrohin | Bengali | India | Choritrohin |
| 2021 | Women in Love | Hindi | India | Choritrohin |
| 2022 | Srikanto | Bengali | India | Srikanta |
