= Devdas (disambiguation) =

Devdas is a Bengali novel by Sarat Chandra Chattopadhyay, first published in 1917 and adapted as a film many times.

Devdas may also refer to:

- Devdas (1928 film), Indian silent film version of the novel, directed by Naresh Mitra, played by Phani Burma as Devdas
- Devdas (1935 film), Indian Bengali version of the novel, directed by Pramathesh Barua, played by himself as Devdas
  - Devdas (1936 film), Indian Hindi version of the novel, directed by Pramathesh Barua
  - Devdas (1937 film), Indian Assamese version of the novel, directed by Pramathesh Barua
- Devdas (1955 film), Indian Hindi version of the novel, directed by Bimal Roy
- Devdas (1965 film), Pakistani Urdu film
- Devdas (1979 film), Indian Bengali version of the novel, directed by Dilip Roy
- Devdas (1982 film), first Bangladeshi adaptation of the novel, directed by Chashi Nazrul Islam, played by Bulbul Ahmed as Devdas
- Devdas (2002 Hindi film), Indian Hindi version of the novel, directed by Sanjay Leela Bhansali, played by Shah Rukh Khan as Devdas
  - Devdas (soundtrack)
- Devdas (2002 Bengali film), Indian Bengali version of the novel, directed by Shakti Samanta
- Devdas (2013 film), second Bangladeshi adaptation of the novel, directed by Chashi Nazrul Islam, played by Shakib Khan as Devdas
- Devdas (2018 film), an Indian Telugu language film directed by Sreeram Aditya

== Persons ==
- Devdas Gandhi (1900–1957), Indian journalist, son of Mohandas Karamchand Gandhi
- Devdas Chakraborty (1933–2008), Bangladesh artist
- Devdas Apte (born 1934), Indian politician
- Devdas Chhotray (born 1955), Indian writer
- Mujibur Rahman Devdas (1929/30-2020), Bangladesh activist

== See also ==
- Dev.D, a 2009 postmodern take on the novel by director Anurag Kashyap starring Abhay Deol, Mahi Gill and Kalki Koechlin
- Devadas (disambiguation)
- Devadasu (disambiguation)
- Devadasi, female temple servants in India
- Devadasi (1948 film), 1948 Indian film
- Daas Dev, a 2018 Indian film directed by Sudhir Mishra
