= Chandramukhi (character) =

- Devdas character
- Created by: Sarat Chandra Chattopadhyay
- Portrayed by: Chandrabati Devi; Vyjayanthimala; Supriya Devi; Kalki Koechlin; Anwara; Madhuri Dixit; Wamiqa Gabbi; For more see "Performers"

In-universe information
- Alias: Chandrika
- Nickname: Leni
- Gender: Female
- Occupation: Tawaif (courtesan)
- Spouse: Devdas Mukherjee (considered)
- Religion: Hindu

Chandramukhi is one of the pivotal characters in the 1917 Bengali novel Devdas by Sarat Chandra Chattopadhyay. Her character was inspired by the Hindu mystical singer Meera, who devoted her life to Lord Krishna; similarly Chandramukhi devoted her life to Devdas. Chandramukhi is portrayed as a tawaif in the novel and its film adaptations. Chandramukhi means "moon faced" or "as beautiful as the moon" in Sanskrit.

== In the novel ==
Chandramukhi is a courtesan (tawaif) who lives in Calcutta (known as Kolkata after 2001). She is considered the most beautiful and richest prostitute in the area of Chitpur. She is first introduced to Devdas by Chunnilal, who returns to Calcutta heartbroken after the marriage of Parvati "Paro". Devdas, disgusted over Chandramukhi's profession insults her and leaves her kotha. Chandramukhi, impressed by Devdas's attitude, later falls in love with him after realizing his steadfast love for Paro. She leaves her profession for Devdas and convinces him to marry her; he, however, has to reluctantly reject her offer as he has devoted his life to Paro. In return, Chandramukhi does not force him to be with her but waits patiently for him. Subsequently, she also moves to Ashthajhari village, where she lives in a muddy house located at the bank of a river and helps the needy. After some struggle, she meets with Devdas again, who now accepts her love.

== Film ==
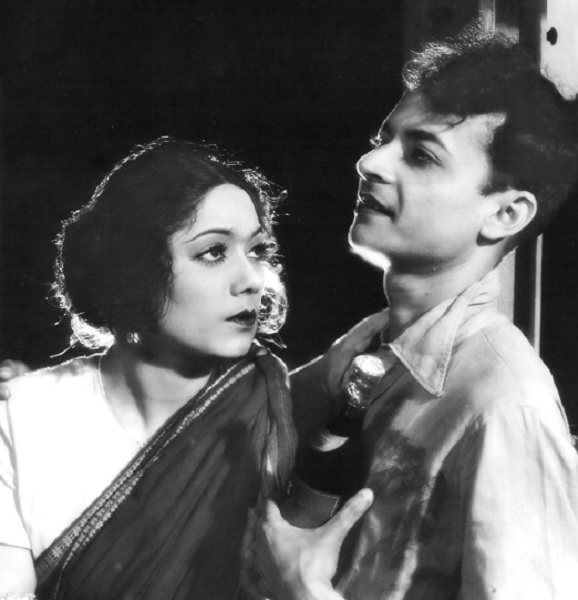
Chandrabati Devi as Chandramukhi and Pramathesh Barua as Devdas in the 1935 Bengali film Devdas

In most of the film adaptations of Devdas, the story of Chandramukhi is similar to the novel. However, in most of the films her humanitarian work in helping the needy is not depicted. Unlike in the novel, a scene in which Chandramukhi and Parvathi meet was added in Bimal Roy's 1955 version when Paro, played by Suchitra Sen riding in a human rickshaw, comes across Chandramukhi, played by Vyjayanthimala, who just stares at Paro without a single word being exchanged between them. The meeting scene of Paro and Chandramukhi in the 1955 version was still regarded as one of the memorable scene in Bollywood with the background music adding the impact to the scene. In the 2002 version, the director, Sanjay Leela Bhansali, extended the interaction between Paro and Chandramukhi, also showing them dancing together to the hit song "Dola Re Dola".

== Performers ==
Year	Title	Portrayed by	Language	Other cast		Notes	Ref.
Year	Title	Portrayed by	Language	Devdas	Paro	Notes	Ref.
1928	Devdas	Niharbala / Miss Parul	Silent	Phani Sarma	Tarakbala	First film adaptation of Devdas	
1935	Devdas	Chandrabati Devi	Bengali	Pramathesh Barua	Jamuna Barua	All directed by Pramathesh Barua.	
1936	Devdas	T. R. Rajakumari	Hindi	K. L. Saigal	Jamuna Barua	All directed by Pramathesh Barua.	
1937	Devdas	Mohini	Assamese	Phani Sarma	Zubeida	All directed by Pramathesh Barua.	
1937	Mukti	Menaka Devi	Hindi	Pramathesh Barua	Kanan Devi	A contemporary retelling capturing the nostalgia and emotions of its male protagonist.	
1937	Mukti	Menaka Devi	Bengali	Pramathesh Barua	Kanan Devi	A contemporary retelling capturing the nostalgia and emotions of its male protagonist.	
1953	Devadasu	Lalitha	Telugu	Akkineni Nageswara Rao	Savitri	The film was simultaneously shot in Telugu and Tamil.	
1953	Devadas	Lalitha	Tamil	Akkineni Nageswara Rao	Savitri	The film was simultaneously shot in Telugu and Tamil.	
1955	Devdas	Vyjayanthimala	Hindi	Dilip Kumar	Suchitra Sen		
1955	Selamat Tinggal, Kekasihku	Molly Lim	Malay	S. Roomai Noor	Chang Lai Lai	Singaporean film also known as Good Bye My Lover.	
1965	Devdas	Nayyar Sultana	Urdu	Habib Taalish	Shamim Ara	Pakistani film	
1974	Devadasu	Jayanthi	Telugu	Krishna	Vijaya Nirmala		
1978	Devadasu Malli Puttadu	Vanisri	Telugu	Akkineni Nageswara Rao	Savitri	Sequel to the 1953 film Devadasu and follows the rebirth of the characters Chandramukhi and Devadasu, now known as Aruna and Sridhar Raja, who are reunited by Parvathi. Additionally, the role of Aruna was portrayed by Vanisri instead of Lalitha.	
1978	Muqaddar Ka Sikandar	Rekha	Hindi	Amitabh Bachchan	Raakhee	Loosely inspired by Devdas and the French play Cyrano de Bergerac.	
1979	Devdas	Supriya Choudhury	Bengali	Soumitra Chatterjee	Sumitra Mukherjee	Also known as Debdas.	
1980	Prema Tarangalu	Jayasudha	Telugu	Krishnam Raju	Sujatha	Remakes of Muqaddar Ka Sikandar.	
1981	Amara Kaaviyam	Sripriya	Tamil	Sivaji Ganesan	Madhavi	Remakes of Muqaddar Ka Sikandar.	
1982	Devdas	Anwara	Bengali	Bulbul Ahmed	Kabori	Bangladeshi film	
1989	Devadas	Ramya Krishnan	Malayalam	Venu Nagavally	Parvathy		
2002	Devdas	Indrani Haldar	Bengali	Prosenjit Chatterjee	Arpita Pal		
2002	Devdas	Madhuri Dixit	Hindi	Shah Rukh Khan	Aishwarya Rai		
2004	Devdas	Sreelekha Mitra	Bengali	Parambrata Chatterjee	Monami Ghosh		
2009	Dev.D	Kalki Koechlin	Hindi	Abhay Deol	Mahie Gill	Modern-day take on Devdas set in contemporary Punjab and Delhi.	
2010	Devdas	Meera	Urdu	Nadeem Shah	Zara Sheikh	Pakistani film	
2013	Devdas	Moushumi	Bengali	Shakib Khan	Apu Biswas	Bangladeshi film	
2017	Devi	Shataf Figar	Bengali	Paoli Dam	Shubh Mukherjee	Modern-day take on Devdas with gender bent versions of characters.	
2017-2021	Dev DD	Sanjay Suri	Hindi	Asheema Vardaan	Akhil Kapoor	Web series and a modern-day take on Devdas with gender bent versions of the characters.	
2018	Daas Dev	Aditi Rao Hydari	Hindi	Rahul Bhatt	Richa Chadha	Modern-day take on Devdas. The film follows a politician's son, Dev, who leads a lavish but troubled life as a drug addict with massive debts, until he is kidnapped and then returns to claim his father's legacy after his uncle suffers a heart attack.	
2026	DC	Wamiqa Gabbi	Tamil	Lokesh Kanagaraj	Sanjana Krishnamoorthy	an alcoholic gangster (Das) and a brutalized sex worker (Chandra) wage a violent war of revenge against corrupt police officers following the tragic death of a bar singer (Parvathy).	
2026	Emperor vs Sarat Chandra	Koushani Mukherjee	Bengali			Based on Sarat Chandra Chattopadhyay's novel Pather Dabi and the controversies around its time of publication; Chandramukhi's special appearance brings a crossover between Chattopadhyay's two celebrated novels	

== Popular culture ==
Chandramukhi is one of the first characters in an Indian novel to deal with prostitution. She was often depicted as a tawaif with a heart of gold. The character of Chandramukhi had paved the way for other portrayals of prostitutes and tawaifs in films like Pyaasa (1957), Sadhna (1958) and Pakeezah (1972).

== Legacy ==
Chandramukhi was well received in India by critics. In 2006, Rediff included Chandramukhi in their list of "Bollywood's Best Tawaif". Nikhat Kazmi of The Times of India also ranked Chandramukhi at #5 in his list "Tart with a heart".

== Awards ==
There are many actresses who have portrayed Chandramukhi in film adaptations of Devdas. The first notable award was won by Vyjayanthimala in 1956 when she won the Filmfare Awards in the Supporting Actress category. However, she was also the first person to decline the award, as she thought that her role was not a supporting one but was of equal importance and parallel to that of Paro in the 1955 version. Madhuri Dixit and Kalki Koechlin and also won the same award as Vyjayanthimala for their respective portrayals.

The following are awards and nominations received by actresses who have played the role of Chandramukhi in film:

Year	Film	Nominee	Award	Result	Note	Ref.
1957	Devdas	Vyjayanthimala	Filmfare Award for Best Supporting Actress	Won	She refused to accept the award as she thought that Chandramukhi and Parvathi were parallel roles and not a supporting role	
2002	Devdas	Madhuri Dixit	Filmfare Award for Best Supporting Actress	Won		
2002	Devdas	Madhuri Dixit	Screen Award for Best Supporting Actress	Won		
2002	Devdas	Madhuri Dixit	Zee Cine Award for Best Actor – Female	Nominated		
2002	Devdas	Madhuri Dixit	IIFA Award for Best Actress	Nominated		
2010	Dev.D	Kalki Koechlin	Filmfare Award for Best Supporting Actress	Won		
2010	Dev.D	Kalki Koechlin	Stardust Award for Breakthrough Performance – Female	Nominated		
2013	Devdas	Moushumi	Bangladesh National Film Award for Best Actress	Won		
2013	Devdas	Moushumi	People's Choice Meril-Prothom Alo Award for Best Film Actress	Nominated		

== See also ==
- List of prostitutes and courtesans
- Hooker with a heart of gold
