= Parineeta =

Parineeta may refer to:

- Parineeta (novel), a 1914 Bengali-language novel by Sarat Chandra Chattopadhyay
- Parineeta (1942 film), directed by Pashupati Chatterjee, based on the novel
- Parineeta (1953 film), directed by Bimal Roy, based on the novel
- Parineeta (1969 film), directed by Ajoy Kar, based on the novel
- Parineeta (1986 film), directed by Alamgir Kabir, Bangladeshi film
- Parineeta (2005 film), directed by Pradeep Sarkar, based on the novel
- Parineeta (2019 film), an Indian Bengali romantic drama film
- Parineeta Borthakur (born 1985), Indian actress

== See also ==
- Parineeti Chopra (born 1988), Indian actress
- Parineetii (TV series), Indian drama television series
