= Zindagi (1940 film) =

1940 film by Pramathesh Barua

- 1940 poster
- Directed by: Pramathesh Barua
- Written by: Javed Hussain and Kidar Nath Sharma
- Produced by: Birendranath Sircar
- Starring: K. L. Saigal; Jamuna; Pahari Sanyal; Sitara Devi
- Cinematography: Pramathesh Barua
- Music by: Pankaj Mullick
- Production company: New Theatres Ltd.
- Release date: 1940
- Running time: 120 minutes
- Country: India
- Language: Hindustani
- Box office: ₹55 lakh

Zindagi (transl. The Life) is a 1940 Indian film, directed by Pramathesh Barua and produced by Birendranath Sircar. Starring K. L. Saigal, Jamuna Barua, Pahari Sanyal, Shyam Laha, Sitara Devi, and Nemo, it revolves around Ratan, an unemployed university graduate, and his relationship with Shrimati, who is on the run from her cruel husband.

Earning ₹55 lakh net (valued at about ₹39.78 crore in 2009), Zindagi was the highest-grossing Indian film at the time of its release, before its record was broken by Khazanchi in 1941.

The film has been described as one of Barua's "most beautiful films, and his last for New Theatres". It was the last film by Barua for New Theatres. Barua later married Jamuna as his second wife. This film was remade into Bengali as Priyo Bandhabi in 1943 and directed By Soumen Mukherjee. No copy of the film is known to exist, making it a lost film.

== Plot ==
Ratan, an unemployed graduate, who works as a gambler encounters an unnamed women, whom he addresses as Shrimati. Shrimati, who has escaped from her brutal husband, teams up with Ratan and they together pretend to run a charitable trust, collecting money from people in the name of donations. The duo buy an apartment and live together.

Shrimati receives news of her father's death and learn that she is the heiress to his wealth. A new Shrimati shuns all forms of corrupt ways of life and starts to do good deeds as a redemption for her sins. She employs Ratan as a tutor to an orphaned girl Lakhia. Ratan realizes that he cannot live without Shrimati and approaches her. Shrimati, who feels that she must pay for her sins, rejects Ratan.

A heartbroken Ratan leaves Lakhia in the care of Shrimati and returns to his old life. Shrimati gives her fortune to a now-grown Lakhia and withdraws from worldly pleasures, awaiting death. The two lovers are shown to have died and reunited in afterlife.

== Cast ==
Credits adapted from the films's pressbook:

- Saigal as Ratan, the vagabond
- Pahari Sanyal as Ratan's friend
- Asalata as Ratan's friends's mistress
- Jamuna as Mrs. X. (Shrimati)
- Sham Laha as Shrimati's husband
- Nemo as Shrimati's father
- Sitara as Shrimati's sister
- Dhruba Kumar Shrimati's officer
- Bikram Kapoor as Shrimati's lawyer
- Rajnirani as Shrimati's companion
- Manorama as Lakhia, Shrimati's mother-in-law
- Ramkumari as Shrimati's sister-in-law

The Sonthal Dancers

- Brajabasi, Lakhmi, Kalo & the crowd

== Music ==
The music composer was Pankaj Mullick with lyrics by Kidar Sharma and Arzu Lucknavi. One of the memorable songs from the film was "So Ja Rajkumari Soja". This lullaby was made famous in this film.

All songs are sung by K. L. Saigal.

Track listing
No.	Title	Singer	Length
1.	"Hey Diwana Hoon, Diwana Hoon"	K. L. Saigal	3:45
2.	"Bichhada Sajan Aaj Mila Hai"	K. L. Saigal
3.	"So Ja Rajkumari So Ja"	K. L. Saigal	2:55
4.	"Door Door Hare Bhare Is Ban Mein"	K. L. Saigal
5.	"Jeevan Asha Ye Hai Meri"	K. L. Saigal	3:00
6.	"Kaajar Kaahe Daarun Nainan Mein"	K. L. Saigal
7.	"Main Kya Jaanu Kya Jaadu Hai"	K. L. Saigal	2:54

== Release ==
=== Promotional activities ===
An advertisement of Zindagi compares Goethe and Voltaire's notions of life with that of Baura's.

=== Critical reception ===
Zindagi generally received positive reviews for critics. The Bombay Chronicle lauded the film for Pankaj Mullick's "divine music", two songs of Segal that are "the soul of melody and pathos," the "cynical" humour of the first half of the film and the "subtle, heart-wrenching" emotionalism of the second half. They also praised the "haunting" performance of Jamuna. Filmindia called the film an "all smoke" and described it as generally "too intellectual" for the average audience. Bhagwan Das Garga writes, "The plot is slight but Barua's nuanced characterization and wealth of observation makes it a richly rewarding work."

=== Controversies ===
In a frame sequence of the 1939 film Aadmi by V. Shantaram, which was simultaneously released along with Zindagi, the romantic "pessimism" of Barua was caricatured. According to Garga, this incident provided enough "grist" for the news media. An unnamed Gujarati weekly remarked, "Shantaram's eye is on life, Barua's on death." Jamil Ansari, a critic, strongly defended Zindagi. Khwaja Ahmad Abbas compared the two films and wrote:

The attitude of Barua and Shantaram towards life is perhaps most vividly reflected in their attitudes towards death. Life is for the Living symbolically ends with Moti's marching feet. Death-helpless, lingering, pathetic death-has been the ending of most of Barua's pictures including Devdas, Manzil, Mukti and Zindagi. In each of these cases it is the fundamentally good man or woman who dies, a victim of cruel, unrelenting circumstances.
