= Devadas =

Devadas may refer to:

- Devadas (1989 film), an Indian Malayalam-language film, based on the novel Devdas
- Devadas (2018 film), an Indian Telugu-language action comedy film

== See also ==
- Devdas (disambiguation)
- Devadasu (disambiguation)
- Devdas, a Bengali-language novel by Indian writer Sarat Chandra Chattopadhyay
