= Devadasu =

Devadasu may refer to:

- Devadasu (1953 film), a 1953 Indian Telugu-Tamil bilingual film
- Devadasu (1974 film), a 1974 Telugu film
- Devadasu Malli Puttadu, a 1978 Telugu film
- Devadasu (2006 film), a 2006 Telugu film

== See also ==
- Devdas (disambiguation)
- Devadas (disambiguation)
