= Devdas =

1917 novel by Sarat Chandra Chattopadhyay

- Devdas – front cover
- Author: Sarat Chandra Chattopadhyay
- Language: Bengali
- Genre: Novel
- Publisher: GCS
- Publication date: 30 June 1917
- Publication place: India
- Media type: Print (hardback and paperback)

Devdas (Bengali: দেবদাস, transliterated as Dēbôdās) is a Bengali romance novel written by Sarat Chandra Chattopadhyay. The story pivots a tragic triangle linking Devdas, an archetypal lover in viraha (separation); Parvati (Paro), his forbidden childhood love; and Chandramukhi, a reformed courtesan (tawaif). Devdas has been adapted on screen 20 times for film and 5 times for single song.

The character of Paro was based on a real life second wife of zamindar Bhuvan Mohan Chowdhury. It was said that the writer had even visited that village. According to sources, the original village was called Hatipota.

== Plot ==
Devdas is a young man from a wealthy Bengali family in the British Raj in the early 1900s. Parvati (Paro) is a young woman from a middle-class Bengali Brahmin family. The two families live in a village called Taalshonapur in Bengal, and Devdas and Parvati are childhood friends.

Devdas goes away for a couple of years to live and study in Calcutta (now Kolkata). During vacations, he returns to his village. Suddenly, both realise that their easy comfort in each other's innocent comradeship has changed to something deeper. Devdas sees that Parvati is no longer the small girl he knew. Parvati looks forward to their childhood love blossoming into a happy lifelong journey in marriage. According to prevailing social custom, Parvati's parents would have to approach Devdas's parents and propose marriage of Parvati to Devdas as Parvati longs for.

Parvati's mother approaches Devdas's mother, Harimati, with a marriage proposal. Although Devdas's mother loves Parvati very much, she isn't so keen on forming an alliance with the family next door. Besides, Parvati's family has a long-standing tradition of accepting dowry from the groom's family for marriage rather than sending dowry with the bride. The alternative family tradition of Parvati's family influences Devdas's mother's decision not to consider Parvati as Devdas' bride, especially as Parvati belongs to a trading (becha-kena chottoghor) lower family. The "trading" label is applied in context of the marriage custom followed by Parvati's family. Devdas's father, Narayan Mukherjee, who also has much affection for Parvati, does not want Devdas to get married so early in life and isn't keen on the alliance. Parvati's father, Nilkantha Chakravarti, feeling insulted at the rejection, finds an even richer husband for Parvati.

When Parvati learns of her planned marriage, she stealthily meets Devdas at night, desperately believing that he will accept her hand in marriage. Devdas has never previously considered Parvati as his would-be wife. Surprised by Parvati's boldly visiting him alone at night, he also feels pained for her. Making up his mind, he tells his father he wants to marry Parvati. Devdas's father disagrees.

In a confused state, Devdas flees to Calcutta. From there, he writes a letter to Parvati, saying that they should simply continue only as friends. Within days, however, he realises that he should have been bolder. He goes back to his village and tells Parvati that he is ready to do anything needed to save their love.

By now, Parvati's marriage plans are in an advanced stage. She refuses to go back to Devdas and chides him for his cowardice and vacillation. She, however, requests Devdas to come and see her before he dies. He vows to do so.

Devdas goes back to Calcutta and Parvati is married off to the widower, Bhuvan Choudhuri, who has three children. An elderly gentleman and zamindar of Hatipota, he had found his house and home so empty and lustreless after his wife's death that he decided to marry again. After marrying Parvati, he spent most of his days in Pujas looking after the zamindari.

In Calcutta, Devdas's carousing friend, Chunni Lal, introduces him to a tawaif (courtesan) named Chandramukhi. Devdas takes to heavy drinking at the courtesan's place; she falls in love with him, and looks after him. His health deteriorates through excessive drinking and despair – a drawn-out form of suicide. In his mind, he frequently compares Parvati and Chandramukhi. Strangely he feels betrayed by Parvati, though it was she who had loved him first, and confessed her love for him. Chandramukhi knows and tells him how things had really happened. This makes Devdas, when sober, hate and loathe her very presence. He drinks more and more to forget his plight. Chandramukhi sees it all happen, suffering silently. She senses the real man behind the fallen, aimless Devdas he has become, and can't help but love him.

Knowing death approaches him fast, Devdas goes to Hatipota to meet Parvati to fulfill his vow. He dies at her doorstep on a dark, cold night. On hearing of his death, Parvati runs towards the door, but her family members prevent her from stepping out of the house.

The novella powerfully depicts the customs of society that prevailed in Bengal in the early 1900s, which largely prevented a happy ending to a true and tender love story.

== Film, TV, and theatrical adaptations ==
Kundal Lal Saigal and Jamuna in Devdas, Barua's 1936 Hindi version

The novel has been made into films in many South Asian languages, including Bengali, Hindustani, Hindi, Telugu, Tamil, Urdu, Assamese and Malayalam. It is the most filmed non-epic story in India.

Notable film versions of the novella include:

Year	Title	Language	Director	Cast			Notes
Year	Title	Language	Director	Devdas	Parvati	Chandramukhi	Notes
1928	Devdas	Silent film	Naresh Mitra	Phani Burma	Tarakbala	Niharbala/Miss Parul	
1935	Devdas	Bengali	P. C. Barua	P.C. Barua	Jamuna Barua	Chandrabati Devi	
1936	Devdas	Hindustani	P. C. Barua	K.L. Saigal	Jamuna Barua	Rajkumari	
1937	Devdas	Assamese	P. C. Barua	Phani Sarma	Zubeida	Mohini	
1953	Devadasu	Telugu	Vedantam Raghavayya	Akkineni Nageswara Rao	Savitri	Lalitha	
1953	Devadas	Tamil	Vedantam Raghavayya	Akkineni Nageswara Rao	Savitri	Lalitha	
1955	Devdas	Hindi	Bimal Roy	Dilip Kumar	Suchitra Sen	Vyjayanthimala	
1955	Selamat Tinggal, Kekasihku	Malay	L. Krishnan	S. Roomai Noor	Chang Lai Lai	Molly Lim	Singaporean film also known as Good Bye My Lover.
1965	Devdas	Urdu	Khawaja Sarfaraz	Habib Taalish	Shamim Ara	Nayyar Sultana	Pakistani film
1974	Devadasu	Telugu	Vijaya Nirmala	Ghattamaneni Krishna	Vijaya Nirmala	Jayanthi	
1978	Muqaddar Ka Sikandar	Hindustani	Prakash Mehra	Amitabh Bachchan	Raakhee	Rekha	loosely inspired by Devdas
1979	Devdas	Bengali	Dilip Roy	Soumitra Chatterjee	Sumitra Mukherjee	Supriya Choudhury	also known as Debdas
1980	Prema Tarangalu	Telugu	S. P. Chitti Babu	Krishnam Raju	Sujatha	Jayasudha	Remake of Muqaddar Ka Sikandar
1981	Amara Kaaviyam	Tamil	Amirtham	Sivaji Ganesan	Madhavi	Sripriya	Remake of Muqaddar Ka Sikandar
1982	Devdas	Bengali	Chashi Nazrul Islam	Bulbul Ahmed	Kabori Sarwar	Anwara	Bangladeshi film
1989	Devadas	Malayalam	Crossbelt Mani	Venu Nagavally	Parvathy	Ramya Krishnan	
2002	Devdas	Bengali	Shakti Samanta	Prasenjit Chatterjee	Arpita Pal	Indrani Halder	
2002	Devdas	Hindi	Sanjay Leela Bhansali	Shah Rukh Khan	Aishwarya Rai	Madhuri Dixit	
2004	Devdas	Bengali		Parambrata Chatterjee	Monami Ghosh	Sreelekha Mitra	
2009	Dev.D	Hindi	Anurag Kashyap	Abhay Deol	Mahie Gill	Kalki Koechlin	Modern-Day Adaptation
2010	Devdas	Urdu	Iqbal Kasmiri	Nadeem Shah	Zara Sheikh	Meera	Pakistani film
2011	Hamaar Devdas	Bhojpuri	Kiran Kant Verma	Ravi Kishan	Akshara Singh	Monalisha	
2013	Devdas	Bengali	Chashi Nazrul Islam	Shakib Khan	Apu Biswas	Moushumi	Bangladeshi film
2017	Devi	Bengali	Rik Basu	Paoli Dam	Shubh Mukherjee	Shataf Figar	Modern-day adaptation
2017–2021	Dev DD	Hindi	Ken Ghosh	Asheema Vardaan	Akhil Kapoor	Sanjay Suri	2 season web series Modern-day adaptation
2018	Daas Dev	Hindi	Sudhir Mishra	Rahul Bhatt	Richa Chadda	Aditi Rao Hydari	Modern-day Aaaptation
2019	Nayaka Ra Na Devdas	Odia	Mrutyunjaya Sahoo	Asit Patra	Bhoomika Dash	Anu Choudhary	
2024	Abdullahpur Ka Devdas	Urdu	Anjum Shahzad				
2026	DC	Tamil	Arun Matheswaran	Lokesh Kanagaraj	Sanjana Krishnamoorthy	Wamiqa Gabbi	Modern-day adaptation

- In Guru Dutt's critically acclaimed film Kaagaz Ke Phool (1959), a sub plot involves Dutt directing a film titled Devdas with Waheeda Rehman playing Paro.
- In Haath Ki Safai (1974), a song in the movie is about the play Devdas with Randhir Kapoor as Devdas and Hema Malini as Chandramukhi.
- In the Tamil remake of the song, Kamal Haasan plays Devdas and Sripriya plays Chandramukhi.
- A sequel of the 1953 Telugu version of Devdasu was released in year 1978, titled Devadasu Malli Puttadu.
- In the 2006 Kannada blockbuster Mungaru Male, a rabbit who is protagonist's pet is named after Devdas.
- In the 2012 Hindi film Kyaa Super Kool Hain Hum, a dream sequence has Tusshar Kapoor as Devdas, Neha Sharma as Paro and Sarah Jane Dias as Chandramukhi.
- Song "Paro" (2022) by Aditya Rikhari, a viral breakout hit that utilizes the thematic essence of Devdas, modernizing the archetype for a contemporary audience.
- In the 2026 Bengali film Emperor vs Sarat Chandra, Koushani Mukherjee plays the character of Chandramukhi and Kalpan Mitra plays the character of Devdas in special appearances.

== See also ==
- Bengal Renaissance
- Mujra dance
- Parinita/Parineeta (1914)
