= Jawab =

Jawab may refer to:

- Jawab (1942 film), an Indian Hindi-language film directed by P. C. Barua
- Jawab (1970 film), an Indian Hindi-language film directed by Ramanna
- Jawab (1995 film), an Indian Hindi-language film directed by Ajay Kashyap
- Jawab, a building on the Riverfront Terrace of the Taj Mahal

== See also ==
- Jawaab, a Hindi film of 1985
