= Adhikar (1939 film) =

- Adhikar
- Directed by: Pramathesh Barua
- Written by: Pramathesh Barua
- Produced by: New Theatres
- Starring: Pramathesh Barua, Jamuna, Pahadi Sanyal, Pankaj Mullick, Rajalakshmi, Menaka Devi, Sailen Choudhury, Indu Mukherjee, Molina Devi, Chitralekha, Ushabati, Jagdish Sethi, Bikram Kapoor
- Cinematography: Yusuf Mulji
- Edited by: Kali Raha
- Music by: Composer: Timir Baran Lyricist: Ajoy Bhattacharya, Munshi Arzoo, Rashid
- Production company: New Theatres
- Release date: 12 January 1939
- Running time: 132 minutes
- Country: India
- Languages: Hindi, Bengali

Adhikar (Hindi अधिकार, Rights) is a social drama film directed by Pramathesh Barua, made in 1939 in Hindi and Bengali languages, and produced by New Theatres.

== Cast ==
- Pramathesh Barua as Nikhilesh
- Jamuna Barua as Indira
- Pahari Sanyal as Ratan
- Menaka Devi as Radha
- Ushabati
- Pankaj Mullick
- Rajlakshmi Devi
- Sailen Choudhury
- Jagdish Sethi
- Indu Mukherjee
