= Mohabbat Ki Kasauti =

- Directed by: P. C. Barua
- Produced by: New Theatres
- Starring: K. L. Saigal; Rattan Bai; Pahari Sanyal; Noor Mohammed Charlie
- Cinematography: Yusuf Mulji
- Music by: R. C. Boral
- Production company: New Theatres
- Release date: 1934
- Running time: 121 minutes
- Country: India
- Language: Hindi

Mohabbat Ki Kasauti also called Rooplekha in Bengali was a 1934 Indian "semi-historical" bilingual film in Hindi and Bengali, directed by P. C. Barua for New Theatres. Though Barua is consistently mentioned as the director, according to author J. K. Bajaj, Debaki Bose directed Rooplekha in 1934. It had music by R. C. Boral and the cast included Rattanbai, K. L. Saigal, Pahari Sanyal, Noor Mohammed Charlie and Vishwanath. Jamuna started her career with a small role in the Hindi version.

The film had Saigal playing the role of Akbar according to Pran Nevile, but it has also been cited as a film based on a Buddhist fable. The film was one of the first Indian Talkies to use the concept of flashback technique in the narrative.

== Cast ==
- K. L. Saigal
- Rattan Bai
- Pahari Sanyal
- Noor Mohammed Charlie
- Jamuna
- Vishwanath

== Soundtrack ==
The music direction was by R. C. Boral and the lyricist was Bani Kumar. There were 13 songs in the film with "Sab Din Hott Na Ek Samaan" sung by Saigal with lyrics by Surdas.

=== Track listing ===
#	Title
1	"Aa Ke Mujhe Raah Dikha De Raah Dikhanewale"
2	"Aalam Ko Pehchanenge Jaise Tumne Pehchana Hai"
3	"Chhayi Hai Kaisi Bahar"
4	"Dekho Dekho Ae Sainya Dekho Mohe Na Satao"
5	"Kaahe Pardesiya Mohe Aise Tadpao"
6	"Kaise Raseele Kaise Kateele Tore Nain Madmate"
7	"More Maharaja Hain Bade Balwan"
8	"Naahi Padat Chain Tadpat Hun Din Rain"
9	"Naiya Mori Majhdhar Ishwar Kar De Paar"
10	"Prem Ki Mann Mein Katari Lagi"
11	"Sab Din Hott Na Ek Saman"
12	"Tora Sang Sainya Mose Na Chhoda Jaaye Re"
13	"Yeh Hai More Chanchal Chit Ki Pukar"
