= Manzil (1936 film) =

- Directed by: P.C. Barua
- Written by: Saratchandra Chattopadhyay
- Produced by: New Theatres
- Starring: Jamuna; Pahari Sanyal; Prithviraj Kapoor
- Cinematography: Bimal Roy
- Music by: R. C. Boral; Pankaj Mullick
- Production company: New Theatres
- Release date: 30 November 1936
- Running time: 144 minutes
- Country: India
- Language: Hindi

Manzil is a 1936 Hindi film from New Theatres. A bilingual made in Hindi and Bengali (Grihadah), it was directed by P.C. Barua from a story by Saratchandra Chattopadhyay. The dialogues and lyrics were by Arzoo Lakhnavi and music composed by R. C. Boral and Pankaj Mullick. The cast included Prithviraj Kapoor, Jamuna, Pahari Sanyal, Molina Devi, K. C. Dey and Boken Chatto. The story, a love triangle, revolves around two friends Mahim and Suresh and the girl they both love, Achala.

== Plot ==
Mahim and Suresh are childhood friends, both in love with Achala. Suresh is rich but adheres to conventional values while Mahim is from a poor family but well-educated. Achala has been given a liberal Brahmo Samaj upbringing. Though fond of both friends, she chooses to marry Mahim and they shift to a village. Achala gradually becomes dissatisfied. Their house burns down and Mahim falls ill. Suresh arrives to nurse Mahim back to health and goes with them to a health resort for Mahim to recover. Achala is attracted to Suresh and they both elope. She later returns to Mahim who forgives her.

== Cast ==
- Jamuna: Achala
- Pahari Sanyal: Mahim
- Prithviraj Kapoor: Suresh
- K. C. Dey
- Molina Devi
- Boken Chatto
- Nemo
