= Devdas (1936 film) =

- Poster
- Directed by: Pramathesh Barua
- Screenplay by: Pramathesh Barua; Kidar Nath Sharma (dialogue)
- Based on: Devdas by Sharat Chandra Chattopadhyay
- Starring: K. L. Saigal; Jamuna Barua; Rajkumari; Sultana
- Cinematography: Bimal Roy
- Music by: Rai Chand Boral; Pankaj Mullick; Timir Baran; Lyrics: Kidar Nath Sharma
- Release date: 1936
- Running time: 139 minutes
- Country: India
- Language: Hindustani

Kundan Lal Saigal and Jamuna Barua. Full movie (2 h 11 min 30 s)

Devdas is a 1936 Hindi-language Indian drama romance film based on the 1917 Sharat Chandra Chattopadhyay novella, Devdas. Directed by Pramathesh Barua, it stars K.L. Saigal as Devdas, Jamuna Barua as Parvati (Paro) and Rajkumari as Chandramukhi. This was Barua's second of three language versions, the first being in Bengali and the third in Assamese.

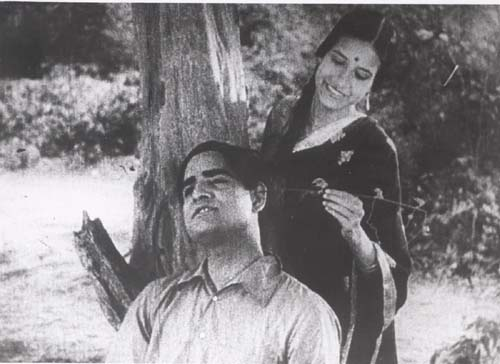
Kundan Lal Saigal and Jamuna Barua in the film

== Plot ==
Devdas falls in love with Parvati, with whom he has played since childhood and who is the daughter of a poor neighbouring family. Devdas goes away to Calcutta for university studies. Meanwhile, Parvati's father arranges her marriage to a much older man. Though she loves Devdas, she obeys her father to suffer in silence like a dutiful Indian daughter and wife of those times. When Devdas returns and learns that his Parvati is married to someone else, he takes to drinking. Chandramukhi, a dancing girl or courtesan (tawaif) he has befriended in Calcutta, falls for him and gives up her profession to try to save him. Parvati, hearing of his decline, comes to see him to steer him away from a life of drinking. Devdas sends her back, saying that in his hour of final need he will come to her. She returns to her life of duty. Realising his end is near, Devdas decides to keep his promise and meet Parvati. He journeys all night, reaches her house and is found dead outside the high walls of her house. Inside the house, Parvati hears from her stepson Mohan, that Devdas is dead. Grief-stricken at this news, Parvati attempts to run out of her house, in order to see his beloved one last time. But her husband orders the main gate to be closed, as it was a social taboo at that time to let women step out of the periphery of their in-laws' residence. Consequently, Paro fails to run out, trips over, and the main gate is shut in front of her. A dead Devdas is taken to the cemetery and cremated by the local people.

== Cast ==
Male

- K. L. Saigal as Devdas
- A. H. Shore as Chunilal
- Pahari as A Friend
- K. C. Dey as Bairagi (Blind Singer)
- Pramathesh Barua alias Mr. Raju as Mohan
- Biswanath as Narayan
- Yusuf Attia as Rai Saheb
- Kailash as Ramdas
- Nemo as Dharmadas
- Kedar as Jagannath
- Kapoor as Cart Driver

Female

- Jamuna as Parbati
- Sultana as Parvati
- Rajakumari as Chandra
- Khettrabala as Piyari
- Sitara as Monorama
- Ramkumari as Padma
- Hemnalini as Parbati's Mother
- Sahana as Jasodha
- Roshanara as Maid Servant

== See also ==
- Devdas (1935 film), Barua's Bengali version
- Devdas (1937 film), Barua's Assamese version
- Devdas (1955 film), Bimal Roy's Hindi production
- Devdas (2002 Hindi film), Bhansali's 2002 remake
- Devdas (2013 film), Bangladeshi version
