= Rani (1943 film) =

- P. C. Barua in Rani
- Directed by: P. C. Barua
- Produced by: Barua Productions
- Starring: P.C. Barua; Patience Cooper; Jamuna
- Cinematography: P. C. Barua
- Music by: Kamal Dasgupta
- Release date: 1943
- Country: India
- Language: Hindi

Rani (Queen) also called Ranee is a Bollywood film. It was released in 1943 and directed by P.C. Barua. Barua produced, scripted and acted as the lead in the film. Jamuna and Patience Cooper were his co-stars. The music direction was by Kamal Dasgupta with lyrics by Pandit Madhur. The film was a bilingual made simultaneously in Hindi and in the Bengali language as Chandar Kalanka ( The Taint On The Moon). The rest of the cast included Jahar Ganguly, Bikram Kapoor and Kalavati.

Rani, a social romantic drama revolved around the character of Malti, a village girl, who escapes to the city when she is targeted by malicious gossip on the eve of her marriage. She adopts the name Rani and starts working in a hotel as a maid.

== Synopsis ==
On the eve of her marriage, Malti, a village girl, finds herself a target of hateful gossip spread by some of the villagers, questioning her chastity. To evade the disrepute caused to her and her family, Malti runs away to the city. The villagers and her family assume her to be dead. In the city Malti finds job as a maid in a hotel where she meets Raj, the Zamindar's (Landowner) younger brother. He has come to the city to learn music. Soon he gets into the habit of drinking. Rani, who has been looking after him, has fallen in love with him. She tries to discourage him from drinking. Raj returns home to his village, and at the same time Rani leaves her job at the hotel and trains to be a nurse. When Raj's drinking becomes a problem, Rani is called to nurse him back to health. The Zamindar now realises he had wrongly believed the village gossip, and he is happy to have Raj and Rani marry.

== Cast ==
- P. C. Barua
- Jamuna
- Patience Cooper
- Jahar Ganguly
- Bikram Kapoor
- Kalavati

== Review ==
The review in the July 1938 issue of Filmindia was negative of P. C. Barua. The editor of the cine-magazine, Baburao Patel found the story with its social implications good, but he censured it for its weak script. He felt that Barua "turned the story into an ordinary romance between a rich idler and a poor street girl and skipped clear of the social values which were inherent in the theme". Barua's looks, acting and "nervous dialogues" "all contribute to create a ludicrous effect". Actress Jamuna gave a "polished" performance and "provides the only saving grace in the picture".

== Soundtrack ==
Music director was Kamal Dasgupta with lyrics by Pandit Madhur.

=== Songlist ===
#	Title
1	"Dekho Kar Ke Yeh Solah Singar"
2	"Dil Bhi Kaisa Hai Nadaan"
3	"Hai Kaun Yeh Pardesi"
4	"Kabhi Chalti Hoon Main"
5	"Piyo Ji Khoob Piyo"
6	"Sawan Ne Boondan Ki Jhaalar Daali"
7	"Ummeed Kya Ho Geet Ki"
8	"Zara Dheere Se Bol"
9	"Zindagi Ek Mai Hai"
