= Manamalai =

- Poster
- Directed by: Chitrapu Narayana Rao
- Screenplay by: Vindhan
- Based on: Parineeta by Sarat Chandra Chattopadhyay
- Produced by: Sriram
- Starring: Gemini Ganesan; Savitri
- Music by: Vedha
- Production company: Janatha Pictures
- Release date: 14 February 1958
- Country: India
- Language: Tamil

Manamalai (Tamil pronunciation: [maɳamaːl̪aɪ̯]; transl. The Wedding Garland) is a 1958 Indian Tamil-language romantic drama film directed by Chitrapu Narayana Rao and written by Vindhan. It is based on the 1914 novel Parineeta by Sarat Chandra Chattopadhyay. The film stars Gemini Ganesan and Savitri. It was released on 14 February 1958, and failed commercially.

== Plot ==
Shekhar and Lalitha are lovers, but their romance is interrupted by Kumar, a wealthy young man.

== Cast ==
- Gemini Ganesan
- Savitri
- Sriram
- Chandrababu
- V. Nagayya
- D. Balasubramaniam
- Girija
- M. Mynavathi

== Production ==
Manamalai, directed by Chitrapu Narayana Rao and written by Vindhan, is based on the novel Parineeta by Sarat Chandra Chattopadhyay. It was produced by Sriram under Janatha Pictures.

== Soundtrack ==
The soundtrack was composed by Vedha. Lyrics were written by Gopalakrishna Bharati, Saravanabavanandhar, Lakshmanadass, Villiputhan & A. Maruthakasi.

Song title	Singers	Lyrics	length
"Nadanam Aadinaar"	Radha Jayalakshmi & P.Leela	Gopalakrishna Bharati	05:11
"Theynozhugu Senthamizh"	Seergazhi Govindarajan	Saravanabavanandhar	07:03
"Nilaiyaaga Veesudhae"	S. Janaki	Lakshmanadass	03:00
"Nadakkaadhu Jambam Palikkaadhu"	T. M. Soundararajan & P. Susheela	Villiputhan	02:14
"Nenjam Alai Modhave"	P. B. Sreenivas	A. Maruthakasi	06:04
"Pennaana Pedhai Vaazhvile"	P. Susheela		03:03
"Chinna Chiru Pennaana"	P. Leela		03:20
"Inbam Yaavumae Thunbam Aagume"	T. M. Soundararajan		03:16

== Release and reception ==
Manamalai was released on 14 February 1958, and failed commercially.

== Bibliography ==
- Paramasivam, M. (2001). திரையுலகில் விந்தன் (in Tamil). அருள் பதிப்பகம். OCLC 50714256.
