= Devadas (1989 film) =

1989 film by Crossbelt Mani

- Directed by: Crossbelt Mani
- Written by: Sharat Chandra Chattopadhyay; Thoppil Bhasi
- Produced by: M. Samuel; Ponnambalam Sedu
- Starring: Venu Nagavally; Parvathy; Ramya Krishna; Madhu; Nedumudi Venu; Jagathy Sreekumar
- Music by: K. Raghavan; Mohan Sithara (Music); P Bhaskaran (Lyrics)
- Release date: 1989
- Country: India
- Language: Malayalam

Devadas is a 1989 Malayalam film, based on the Sharat Chandra Chattopadhyay Bengali novel Devdas.

== Cast ==
- Venu Nagavally as Devadas
- Ramya Krishna as Chandramukhi
- Parvathy
- Madhu
- Nedumudi Venu
- Balan K. Nair
- Ganesh Kumar
- Bahadoor
- Jagathy Sreekumar
- Bobby Kottarakkara
- Aryad Gopalakrishnan
- Kaviyoor Ponnamma
- Meena
- Master Suresh
- Baby Sindhu (Sindhu Varma)

== Soundtrack ==
The music was composed by K. Raghavan and Mohan Sithara, with lyrics by P. Bhaskaran.

No.	Song	Singers	Music director
1	"Aadanoru"	R. Usha	Mohan Sithara
2	"Ente Sundara"	K. J. Yesudas	Mohan Sithara
3	"Poovil Ninnum Manam"	K. J. Yesudas	K. Raghavan
4	"Swapnamaalinee Theerathu"	K. J. Yesudas, B. Arundhathi	K. Raghavan
5	"Thekkele Kunnathe"	R. Usha, Sindhudevi	K. Raghavan
