= Jawab (1942 film) =

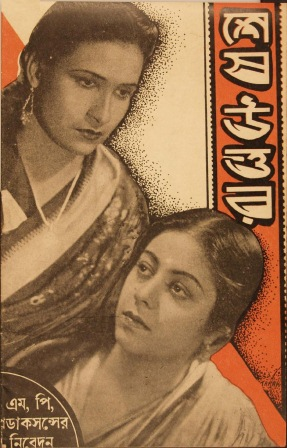
- Shesh Uttar Alternative title for Jawab
- Directed by: P.C. Barua
- Starring: Ratin Banerjee; P.C. Barua; Ahindra Choudhury Kananbala devi
- Music by: Kamal Dasgupta
- Release date: 1942
- Running time: 157 min
- Country: India
- Language: Hindi

Jawab is a 1942 Indian Bollywood film about the love triangle between a man and two women, where the hero, played by Barua, can be no one's lover. The film was directed by P.C Barua. It was the fourth highest grossing Indian film of 1942.

== Plot ==
The plot of movie revolves around wealthy, eccentric and self-obsessed Manoj, who is caught in a love triangle between Reba, the feisty, strong-headed, ideological and independent daughter of a meek millionaire Rai bhahadur, and Meena, the soft-spoken, warm-hearted and honest granddaughter of an old Station Master.

== Cast ==
- Pramathesh Barua as Manoj
- Kanan Devi as Meena
- Jamuna as Reba
- Ahindra Choudhury as Raibahadur, Reba's Father
- Jogesh Choudhury as Meena's Grandfather, Station Master
- Ratin Banerjee as Barin, barrister
- Bikram Kapoor as Nattu, Servant
- Ranjit Ray as Bhiku
- Devabala as Manoj's Mother
- Krishnadhan Mukherjee as Doctor
- Tulsi Chakraborty
- Satya Mukherjee

== Soundtrack ==
#	Title	Singer(s)	Lyricist
1	"Duniya ye duniya toofan mail"	Kanan Devi	Pandit Madhur
