= Mohini (Assamese actress) =

Indian actress

- Born: 1919; Orissa, India
- Died: 1951 (aged 31–32); Assam, India
- Occupation: Actress
- Known for: Assamese cinema

Mohini (1919–1951) was an Indian actress of the Assamese cinema.

== Filmography ==
- Manomati (1941)
- Heer
- Indramalati (1939)
- Laaz Ke (1938)
- Gaan (1938)
- Aayan (1938)
- Torali (1938)
- Mansi (1937)
- Devdas, in the role of Chandramukhi
- Jaanu (1936)
