= Muqaddar Ka Sikandar (1978 film) =

- Film poster
- Directed by: Prakash Mehra
- Written by: Kader Khan; Vijay Kaul; Laxmikant Sharma
- Produced by: Prakash Mehra
- Starring: Amitabh Bachchan; Vinod Khanna; Raakhee Gulzar; Rekha; Ranjeet; Amjad Khan
- Music by: Kalyanji-Anandji
- Distributed by: Prakash Mehra Productions
- Release date: 27 October 1978
- Running time: 182 minutes
- Country: India
- Language: Hindi

Muqaddar Ka Sikandar (transl. Conqueror of Destiny) is a 1978 Indian Hindi-language romantic action drama film produced and directed by Prakash Mehra, and written by Kader Khan, Vijay Kaul and Laxmikant Sharma. It stars Amitabh Bachchan, in his fifth of nine films with Prakash Mehra, along with Vinod Khanna, Raakhee, Rekha, Ranjeet, and Amjad Khan in pivotal roles, while Nirupa Roy, and Kader Khan gave special appearances. The film tells of the story of Sikandar (played by Amitabh Bachchan), an orphan raised in the slums of Bombay. The film's plot is loosely inspired by the Bengali novel Devdas (1917). and the French play Cyrano de Bergerac.

Muqaddar Ka Sikandar was the highest-grossing Bollywood film of 1978, and the biggest Diwali blockbuster of all time. It was also the third highest-grossing Indian film of the decade, after Sholay and Bobby. Muqaddar Ka Sikandar was also an overseas blockbuster in the Soviet Union.

At the 26th Filmfare Awards, it was nominated for nine Filmfare Awards, including Best Film, but did not win in any category. It was remade into the Telugu film Prema Tarangalu (1980), and in Tamil as Amara Kaaviyam (1981). It was the last movie where Vinod Khanna and Amitabh bachchan acted together after giving 6 successful films.

== Plot ==
The story revolves around a nameless, young orphan boy who finds employment in the house of a wealthy man, Ramnath (Shriram Lagoo). Unfortunately, Ramnath harbors an intense dislike for the boy due to a tragic incident involving another orphan who had killed Ramnath's wife. Despite this, Ramnath's young daughter Kaamna empathizes with the boy, and they develop a strong bond of friendship.

Later on, the boy is adopted by a Muslim woman named Fatima, (Nirupa Roy), who also works for Ramnath. She renames him Sikandar, meaning "Conqueror," and takes on the responsibility of raising him as her own son. However, things take a turn for the worse when Sikandar is accused of trying to rob Ramnath's house while attempting to deliver a birthday gift to Kaamna. Ramnath promptly banishes Sikandar and his mother from his home.

Unfortunately, tragedy strikes again when Fatima dies, leaving the young Sikandar to look after her daughter, Mehroo. In the midst of his grief and despair, Sikandar seeks guidance from a fakir named Darvesh Baba, (Kader Khan). The wise Darvesh Baba advises Sikandar to find happiness in sadness and embrace the challenges of life. By doing so, he will become the conqueror of fate.

The film cuts to grown up Sikandar (Amitabh Bachchan), revealing he has amassed a fortune by turning in smugglers and thieves to the police and receiving the reward payouts. With all his wealth, he has managed to build an impressive house for himself and Mehroo, along with setting up a profitable business. He still has not forgotten Kaamna (Raakhee). She and her father have fallen on hard times, but they snub all offers from Sikandar to become reacquainted. When Sikandar tries to speak to Kaamna she demands that he never speak to her again. Sikandar is upset by this and becomes a heavy drinker. He also begins to visit Zohra Begum's (Rekha) brothel on a regular basis. Zohra falls into an unrequited love with Sikander and begins to refuse other clients.

One night in a bar, Sikandar is introduced to Vishal Anand (Vinod Khanna), a down-on-his-luck lawyer. A friendship is formed when Vishal risks his own life to save Sikandar from a bomb blast. Vishal and his mother move into Sikandar's house. A criminal named Dilawar (Amjad Khan) is in love with Zohra, and learns about her love for Sikandar. Dilawar confronts Sikandar and in the ensuing fight is thrashed by him. He swears to kill Sikandar.

At length Ramnath and Kaamna, who have been struggling financially, discover that Sikandar has been anonymously paying their bills. Ramnath goes to thank him. The two households become friendly, and Vishal begins to work with Ramnath. Encouraged, Sikandar tries to profess his love to Kaamna through a love letter. Because Sikandar himself is illiterate, Vishal transcribes the letter for him, but the plan backfires when Kaamna mistakes the letter as actually being from Vishal. Vishal is unaware that Kaamna is the girl Sikandar loves, and they begin to date. Sikandar, upon learning this, struggles with his emotions but decides he must sacrifice his love for the sake of his friendship with Vishal. He covers up any evidence of his feelings toward Kaamna, and at his urging, Vishal and Kaamna plan to marry.

Meanwhile, the marriage of Mehroo is at risk of being cancelled; her fiancé's family have learned about Sikandar's frequent visits to Zohra, and they object to the union on these grounds. Vishal, knowing Sikandar won't change, visits Zohra and offers to pay her if she agrees to abandon Sikandar. Zohra, upon learning the reason, refuses the money but promises Vishal that she would rather die than let Sikandar visit her again. Later, Sikandar arrives at Zohra's. When she is unable to stop his entry, she kills herself by consuming poison hidden in her diamond ring, and dies in his arms.

Dilawar in the meantime has formed an alliance with Sikandar's arch enemy, J. D. (Ranjeet), and upon learning of Zohra's death hatches a plan to destroy Sikandar and his family. Kaamna and Mehroo are both preparing for their weddings; J. D. and his henchmen kidnap Mehroo but Vishal follows them and rescues her. Dilawar kidnaps Kaamna, but Sikandar follows him. He rescues Kaamna and sends her home while he fights Dilawar. In the final battle, both Dilawar and Sikandar are mortally wounded and Dilawar is surprised to learn that Sikandar never loved Zohra. A dying Sikandar reaches the wedding of Kaamna and Vishal. Just as the wedding ceremony is completed, Sikandar collapses. His dying words inadvertently reveal his love for Kaamna, and Vishal sings him a reprise from the movie's theme song: "Life is going to betray you someday... Death is your true love as it will take you along..." Sikandar's entire life flashes before him and he dies in Vishal's arms just as the song is completed. The film ends with the wedding having become a funeral.

== Cast ==
- Amitabh Bachchan as Sikandar
- Vinod Khanna as Vishal Anand
- Raakhee as Kaamna
- Rekha as Zohra Bai
- Ranjeet as J.D.
- Amjad Khan as Dilawar
- Nirupa Roy as Fatima

(Cameo Appearance)

- Kader Khan as Darvesh Baba (Cameo Appearance)
- Shreeram Lagoo as Ramnath
- Goga Kapoor as Goga
- Ram Sethi as Pyarelal
- Mahu Malini as Mehroo, Fatima's daughter
- Baby Shalu as young Kaamna
- Manmohan Krishna as Piano Instructor
- Paidi Jairaj as Dr. Kapoor
- Yusuf Khan as Paul
- Vikas Anand as Police Inspector
- Sulochana Latkar as Vishal's Mother
- Sunder as Bus Conductor
- Mayur Raj Verma as Young Sikandar

== Soundtrack ==
The Soundtrack was composed by the duo of the brothers Kalyanji–Anandji, with the lyrics by Anjaan and Prakash Mehra (Salaam-e-Ishq).

Song	Singer	Raga
Salaam-E-Ishq Meri Jaan Zara Qubool Kar Lo	Kishore Kumar, Lata Mangeshkar	Yaman Kalyan
O Saathi Re (Male)	Kishore Kumar	Shivaranjani
O Saathi Re (Female)	Asha Bhosle	Shivaranjani
Muqaddar Ka Sikandar	Kishore Kumar	
Muqaddar Ka Sikandar (Sad)	Mohammad Rafi	
Pyar Zindagi Hai, Pyar Bandagi Hai	Lata Mangeshkar, Mahendra Kapoor, Asha Bhosle	
Wafa Jo Na Ki To	Hemlata	
Dil To Hai Dil	Lata Mangeshkar	

Vocals were supplied by Kishore Kumar for Amitabh Bachchan, with Mohammed Rafi and Mahendra Kapoor for Vinod Khanna. Rafi's voice was used for the sad version of the title track.

Rafi wanted Kumar to sing the sad version, but agreed to sing it himself upon music directors Kalyanji–Anandji's insistence.

== Box office ==
Produced on a budget of ₹10 million, the film grossed ₹170 million in India. It was the highest-grossing film of the year, as well as the third highest-grossing film of the decade, after Sholay (1975) and Bobby (1973). The film was a blockbuster, according to Box Office India. The film was such a huge hit, that people used to stand in queues, waiting endlessly, to buy the film's tickets. Sometimes the crowds slept in front of the cinema halls overnight in their wait for the tickets. Its Indian gross is equivalent to $20.76 million in 1978. (Note: ₹8.19 per US dollar in 1978) Adjusted for inflation, its Indian gross is equivalent to ₹5.5 billion ($56.94 million) in 2017.

It was also an overseas blockbuster in the Soviet Union, where the film grossed 6.3 million rubles (25.2 million ticket sales, at average 25 kopecks ticket price), which was $7.96 million (Note: 0.791 rubles per US dollar in 1984) (₹98.9 million) (Note: 12.43 Indian rupees per US dollar in 1984) in 1984. Adjusted for inflation, its overseas gross is equivalent to $25 million (₹1.827 billion) in 2017.

Worldwide, the film grossed ₹269 million ($31.75 million). Adjusted for inflation, this is equivalent to $157 million (₹11.53 billion) in 2017.

In terms of footfalls, the film sold an estimated 67 million tickets in India, and 25.2 million tickets in the Soviet Union, for an estimated total of 92 million tickets sold worldwide.

== Accolades ==
26th Filmfare Awards
Category	Recipient(s)	Result
Best Film	Prakash Mehra	Nominated
Best Director	Prakash Mehra	Nominated
Best Actor	Amitabh Bachchan	Nominated
Best Supporting Actor	Vinod Khanna	Nominated
Best Supporting Actress	Rekha	Nominated
Best Comedian	Ram Sethi	Nominated
Best Male Playback Singer	Kishore Kumar (For "O Saathi Re Tera Bina")	Nominated
Best Female Playback Singer	Asha Bhosle for (For "O Saathi Re Tera Bina")	Nominated
Best Story	Laxmikant Sharma	Nominated

== See also ==
- Amar Akbar Anthony
- Coolie
- Muslim social
