= Parineeta (1953 film) =

Parineetaa
- Directed by: Bimal Roy
- Screenplay by: Bimal Roy
- Dialogues by: Vrajendra Gaur; Nabendu Ghosh (additional)
- Story by: Sarat Chandra Chattopadhyay
- Based on: Parineeta by Sarat Chandra Chattopadhyay
- Produced by: Ashok Kumar
- Starring: Ashok Kumar; Meena Kumari
- Cinematography: Kamal Bose
- Edited by: Hrishikesh Mukherjee
- Music by: Manna Dey; Arun Mukherjee
- Production company: Ashok Kumar Production Ltd.
- Release date: 23 January 1953
- Running time: 151 minutes
- Language: Hindi
- Box office: ₹60 lakh (equivalent to ₹63 crore or US$6.6 million in 2023)

Parineeta (Hindi pronunciation: [pəɾɪniːtaː]; transl. Married woman) is a 1953 Indian Hindi-language drama film directed by Bimal Roy. It stars Meena Kumari and Ashok Kumar in the lead. It is a remake of the 1942 Bengali film of the same name, which itself is based upon the 1914 Bengali novella of the same name by Sarat Chandra Chattopadhyay. This version of the film is considered by many to be the most faithful adaptation of the novella, particularly due to Meena Kumari's interpretation of the role of Lalita.

== Story ==
Lalita (Meena Kumari) is an orphaned niece of an impoverished clerk named Gurucharan (Nazir Hussain). Shekhar (Ashok Kumar), is the son of their rich landlord neighbor. Shekhar had a liking for Lalita. Gurucharan has to mortgage his house to Shekhar's father in order to get one of his daughters married as he is heavily debt-ridden. Shekhar's father often chides him about his overdue loan and a day comes when completely pressed on all sides, Gurucharan is forced to take advantage of the altruistic offer of an interest-free loan made by a wealthy young man named Girin. This gives rise to an ugly misunderstanding that Lalita has been "sold" to Girin. What happens thereafter forms the gripping conclusion of this great story of perfect love.

== Cast ==
- Ashok Kumar as Shekhar Rai
- Meena Kumari as Lalita
- Asit Baran as Girin
- Nazir Hussain as Gurucharan
- Badri Prasad as Nabin Rai
- Pratima Devi (Hindi actress) as Shekhar's Mother
- Manorama as Chachi
- Rekha Mallick

== Music ==
Lyrics: Bharat Vyas

Music : Manna Dey & Arun Mukherjee

1. "Aye Baandi Tum Begum Bano Khwab Dekha Hai" – Kishore Kumar, Asha Bhosle, Music: Manna Dey
2. "Gore Gore Haathon Mein Mehndi Racha Ke, Nainon Mein Kajra Daal Ke" – Asha Bhosle, Music: Arun Mukherjee
3. "Chali Radhe Rani" – Manna Dey, Music: Manna Dey
4. "Chand Hai Wohi, Udaas Mera Mann" – Geeta Dutt, Music: Manna Dey
5. "Toota Hai Naata Meet Ka Par Meet Mila Hamen Meet Ka" – Asit Baran Music: Arun Mukherjee
6. "Tum Yaad Aa Rahe" – Asha Bhosle, Music: Arun Mukherjee

== Awards ==
- 1954 Filmfare Best Director Award – Bimal Roy
- 1954 Filmfare Best Actress Award – Meena Kumari
