= Devdas (2002 Bengali film) =

- Directed by: Shakti Samanta
- Story by: Sharat Chandra Chattopadhyay
- Starring: Prosenjit Chatterjee; Arpita Pal; Tapas Paul; Indrani Halder
- Music by: Babul Bose
- Production company: Arjoe Entertainment
- Release date: 31 May 2002
- Running time: 128 minutes
- Country: India
- Language: Bengali

Devdas is a 2002 Bengali drama film directed by Shakti Samanta, based on the 1917 Sharat Chandra Chattopadhyay novel, Devdas.

== Plot ==
The plot revolves around the love affair between Devdas and Parbati. Devdas, a village Zamindar's son enjoys a lovely childhood with his childhood friend Parvati, who belongs to a middle-class family. Devdas and Parvati are once separated in childhood as Devdas leaves the village for higher studies. After he returns, Devdas expresses his love for Parvati and she reciprocates. However they are again separated due to social norms. Will society allow Devdas and Parvati to be together?

== Cast ==
- Prasenjit Chatterjee as Devdas
- Tapas Paul as Chunilal
- Arpita Pal as Parbati aka Paro
- Indrani Haldar as Chandramukhi
- Chetana Das
- Jisshu Sengupta as Paro's son
