= Devdas (1935 film) =

1935 Bengali film by Pramathesh Barua

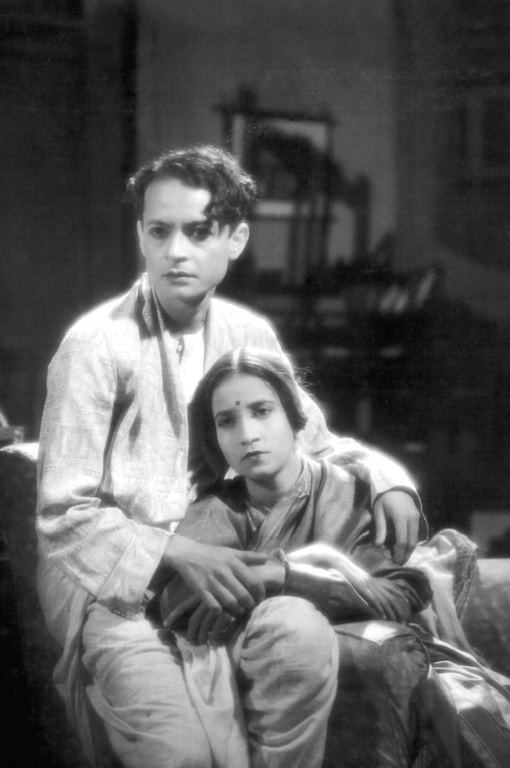
- Pramathesh Barua and Jamuna Barua in a sequence of the film
- Directed by: Pramathesh Barua
- Screenplay by: Pramathesh Barua
- Based on: Devdas by Sharat Chandra Chattopadhyay
- Produced by: New Theatres Ltd
- Starring: Pramathesh Barua; Jamuna Barua; Chandrabati Devi
- Cinematography: Dilip Gupta; Sudhin Majumdar; Yusuf Mulji; Nitin Bose
- Edited by: Subodh Mitra
- Music by: Timir Baran; Raichand Boral; Pankaj Mullik
- Distributed by: Aurora Film Corporation
- Release date: 30 March 1935
- Running time: 141 min.
- Country: India
- Language: Bengali

Devdas is a 1935 Bengali film directed by Pramathesh Barua and based on the 1917 Sharat Chandra Chattopadhyay novel, Devdas. It stars Barua as Devdas, Jamuna Barua as Parvati (Paro) and Chandrabati Devi as Chandramukhi. This was Barua's first of three language versions of the story, the second being in Hindi and the third in Assamese. The Bengali film was dubbed into Tamil and was released in 1936. K. L. Saigal sang two songs in Tamil for this film.

Sharat Chandra Chatterjee's classic novel Devdas is about two lovers - Debdas and Parbati - who can never unite as mortals because of the class system in the society. Sharat Chandra Chaterjee is believed to have been in his teens when he wrote Devdas in 1901. But it was published in 1917. This classic masterpiece sensitively criticizes the feudalistic society that prevailed.

All Indian prints of this Bengali version were destroyed decades ago in a fire that ravaged New Theatre’s studios. Currently, there is only one copy of the film which belongs to the Bangladesh Film Archives, of which almost 40 percent is destroyed.

== Plot ==
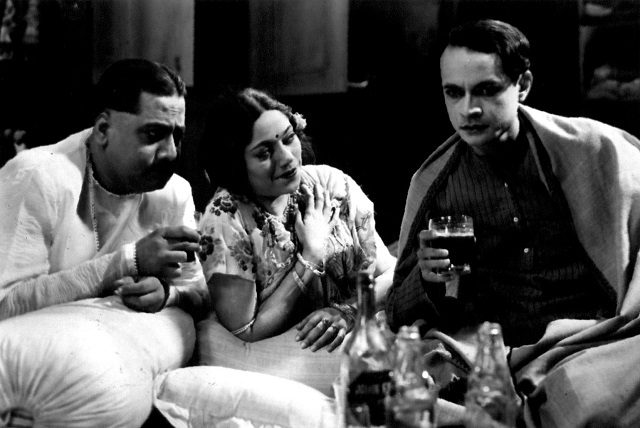
Amar Mullick, Chandrabati Devi and Pramathesh Barua in a sequence of the film

The son of Zamindar Narayan Mukherjee, Devdas was born with a silver spoon in his mouth. He grew up in the lush village of Taj Sonapur, where he spent his childhood, indulged by his lovely playmate Paro. They grew up sharing a special relationship, in which they existed only to each other. Oblivious of all the differences of status and background, a bond that would never break grew between them. Slowly, it changed to love but it was still unsaid. But the reverie was broken when his family sent Devdas to Calcutta for education. Paro's world crashed knowing that her Devdas would be gone and she lit a diya, for it signified the quick return of her loved one. Years passed and Devdas returned. Devdas was besotted by Paro's stunning beauty and longed to have her back. But Zamindar Narayan Mukherjee, Devdas' father, met Paro's mother Sumitra's marriage proposal with condescending arrogance. It caused a rift between the families and even though Devdas tried to convince his father, only antagonism came his way. Finally, he moved away from Paro and wrote a letter to her, asking her to forget him. Only, he didn't realize that he would never be able to forget her ever. And much later, when he reached out to her, it was too late as she was far too humiliated. She scorned him for not standing by her and they parted forever with a heart-broken Paro entering into a chaste marriage with a wealthy, much older man, Zamindar Bhuvan, while a shattered Devdas walked towards anguish, alcoholism & Chandramukhi. Chandramukhi, a stunning tawaif instantly lost her heart to Devdas. A unique bond was formed between both as he could share with her the intense pain of his unfulfilled love for Paro. Meanwhile, Paro, on the other hand, performed her worldly duties sincerely, but in her heart, she could never forget Devdas for a moment. Strange was the fate of Devdas. Intensely loved by two women, who were never meant to be his. One whom he could never love and one whom he could never stop loving.

== Main cast ==
- Pramathesh Barua as Devdas
- Chandrabati Devi as Chandramukhi
- Jamuna Barua as Parvati / Paro
- K. L. Saigal as a guest at Chandramukhi's house
- Ahi Sanyal
- Nirmal Bannerjee
- Manoranjan Bhattacharya
- Dinesh Ranjan Das
- Krishna Chandra Dey
- Amar Mullick
- Sailen Pal
- Prabhavati Devi

== Production ==
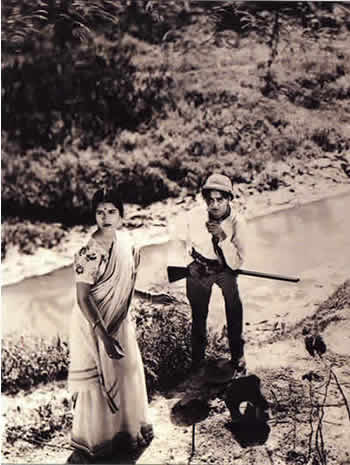
Pramathesh Barua and Jamuna Barua in Devdas, 1935

Devdas, based on a popular Bengali novel by Sarat Chandra Chatterjee, revolutionized the entire look of Indian social pictures. Rather than just translate one medium to another, PC Barua uses the novel as just raw material, creating his own structure and transforming what was purely verbal into an essentially visual form. Avoiding stereotypes and melodrama, Barua raises the film to a level of noble tragedy. The film's characters are not heroes and villains but ordinary people conditioned by a rigid and crumbling social system. Even the lead character Devdas has no heroic dimensions to his character. What we see are his weaknesses, his narcissism, his humanity as he is torn by driving passion and inner-conflict.

The film is a complete departure from the then prevalent theatricality in acting, treatment and dialogue. Barua initiates a style of acting that is natural and unaffected. His method is to underplay, to convey emotion through the slightest tremor of the voice and use significant pauses in between the dialogue to maximum effect. This naturalness of tone spills over to the dialogue as well. Rather than dialogue in a florid style as was prevalent then, Barua who had been exposed to European naturalistic trends ensures the dialogue in the film is what one speaks in real life.

KL Saigal played Devdas in the Hindi version (Barua himself played the role in the Bengali version) and the film took him to cult star status. His songs in the film Balam Aaye Baso Mere Man Mein and Dukh ke Din Ab Beete Nahin became smash hits and set the tone for a glorious filmic career till his death in 1947. Saigal remains the prototype of Devdas till today, no mean feat considering screen giants such as Dilip Kumar, Akkineni Nageswara Rao and Soumitra Chatterjee repeated the role later.

Devdas has been remade a number of times, New Theatres remade it in Tamil in 1937, it was made twice in Telugu in 1953 and 1974 but the most famous subsequent version was the one by Bimal Roy who had photographed this version. The film, made in 1955, starred Dilip Kumar, Suchitra Sen and Vyjayanthimala as Devdas, Parvati and Chandramukhi respectively. The undercurrent of Devdas runs strong in the central character in both of Guru Dutt. Sanjay Leela Bhansali has made a version of the film in 2002 with Shah Rukh Khan, Aishwarya Rai and Madhuri Dixit in the three lead roles.

=== Box office and ratings ===
Devdas (1935), produced by New Theatres is an all-time hit. It made Pramathesh Chandra Barua (1903–1951) a star overnight and revolutionalised the concept of cinema as entertainment into cinema of social concern and literature expressed through celluloid. Sarat Chandra Chatterjee, a then-frequent visitor at the New Theatres studio in south Calcutta, told Barua after seeing Devdas, "It appears that I was born to write Devdas because you were born to recreate it in cinema." It was a rare tribute from a writer to the actor-director of a film based on his story. Over time, the character of Devdas became synonymous with the name of PC Barua. Till today, the image of PC Barua the man is inseparable from the image of Devdas, the character he played.

== Reviews and critiques ==
Sarat Chandra Chattopadhyay (1876–1938) wrote Devdas in 1901 when he was 25. But he could not find a publisher till 1917. Sarat Chandra was sympathetic to the woman - repressed at home and tortured outside. He was partial to those who, for no fault of theirs, incurred the disapproval or displeasure of the family or community. The social and domestic atmosphere in Sarat Chandra's works does not exist any more. But the story interest keeps the reader hooked, irrespective of the plausibility or otherwise of the narrative. His stories were extremely ‘filmogenic’ and therefore, novels like Parineeta (1914), Biraj Bou (1914) and Palli Samaj (1916), appear as topical to the Indian filmmaker as stories written by contemporary writers. Translated in many Indian languages, Devdas continues to be Sarat Chandra Chatterjee's most successful and controversial novel.

The climax of the film was Pramathesh's original contribution to the story because Sarat Chandra had written it differently. Had Devdas the film, ended the way the novel did, the audience might not have understood it. Barua decided that when Parvati would hear that her Devdas was dying under a tree outside her house, she would run out to see him. But as she would rush out, the doors would begin to close on her. This door is a metaphor for the social taboo against a married woman rushing out to see her former lover, crossing the threshold of her marital home. It was unthinkable in those days. "Barua conceptualised this entire scene. It was not there in the novel. When Sarat Babu saw the film, he was so moved that he told Barua that even he had never thought of ending the novel the way Barua had done," informed Jamuna Barua. Sarat Babu went on to tell Pramathesh that this actor's entry into films was solely to give life to Devdas, the character he had created through the written word.

Devdas turned into a folk hero for all time. Pramathesh metamorphosed into a cultural icon of his time since he directed and brought to life the Devdas character. Yet, the story goes that Pramathesh was under severe mental stress during the making of this film because he was still coping with his grief over the death of Kshiti (Amala Devi) who had died before he began to make the film. The script of Devdas was being written while Pramathesh was already shooting Rooprekha. After finishing the casting, Pramathesh discovered that he had not found the Parvati he was looking for. Kanan Devi was approached but she had to decline because she was already under contract with Radha Films. He then chanced upon Jamuna, sister of Sitara and Jaya Gupta of Varanasi, who was chosen to portray Parvati. Sometime during the making of the film, the reel-love story turned into a love story in real life. Pramathesh married Jamuna. As soon as work on Devdas was complete, Jamuna gave birth to their son who, to rhyme with the film that brought the lovers together, was christened Debkumar.

Devdas was released in Chitra Talkies on 26 April 1935. There are several scenes in Devdas that marked the entry of the jump cut to heighten the drama through a new editing strategy. When Devdas vomits blood during his travels, the camera cuts in to show a plate of floral offerings fall off Parvati's hands, far away in her matrimonial home. In a night scene on the train, as soon as Devdas calls out to Paro, the scene cuts once again to show the doors and windows burst open in Parvati's room as Parvati screams out in sleep in the middle of a nightmare. These scenes set out Pramathesh's creative imagination in explaining through the language of cinema the psychological stress his characters were reeling under, as also the telepathic bonding the lovers shared, without reducing these to melodrama or using sentimental dialogue.

According to the late Phani Majumdar, Pramathesh's best performance is in Devdas. He describes, in particular, the scene where Devdas, after his beloved Parvati has been married to another, wanders aimlessly, drinking and shooting birds at random. A friend of Parvati who spots him from a distance while carrying a pot of water back home, is scared to cross his path. But Devdas merely comes close to the girl and asks her how she is, thus building a scene to an unpredictable anti-climax in a film spilling over with dramatic twists and turns and human tragedy. This is an example of how Pramathesh had gained both command and control over the medium of cinema. As an actor, Pramathesh abhorred melodrama. He kept his face almost deadpan, used minimum body language and left it to his audience to read from his emotions and from the total mise-en-scene.

Barua did not create Devdas - he was Devdas. So powerful was the impact of Pramathesh's portrayal on screen, so close it grew to his private life, that to the Bengali audience, Devdas was synonymous with the actor who played the character. By the time the film was released, Pramathesh became aware that he had contacted tuberculosis, and, drawn inescapably to the bottle like his screen parallel, wasted himself away slowly and surely, to die barely 15 years after he had lived the character of Devdas on screen.

The social relevance of Devdas lies in the fact that it was the first film to place on celluloid the social ramifications of a man of high birth who moves away from his feudal, upper-class roots in rural Bengal to the colonial city of Calcutta during pre-World War II years. It tried to explore the inner pain of this man, torn between the pull he feels towards his village roots and his wish to run away to the city to escape from the tragic reality of a lost love. His wilful manner of moving towards self-destruction could be read as his casual indifference to the village that he once belonged to, a village he now responds to with mixed feelings. Before his death, he tries in vain to run away from an anonymous death in the unfeeling city by coming back to the village in one last desperate attempt to renew his lost ties. The harsh, heartless reality of the city has changed his perspective towards the village. He finally rejects the tempting illusions and fantasies the city once held for him. The city loses Devdas but the village too refuses to accept him even in his ignominious, humiliating death. Only two women - Parvati and Chandramu- khi - who operate like invisible, unwritten ‘guardians of conscience’ in the wreckage his life is reduced to, are left to grieve over his death.

For Parvati, Devdas symbolises the rebel from a feudal family who breaks rules only to come back to them in the end, proving that he is no rebel after all. For Chandramukhi, Devdas represents the generosity that characterises a prince who wills himself to self-destruction through excess. Devdas failed to offer social respectability to the two women in his life. The audience blurred the line between the Devdas they saw on screen and Pramathesh Barua, the man who was playing a role. The screen character meshed completely with the actor who brought the character to life on celluloid.

Stylistically, Pramathesh adopted a refreshing economy throughout the film. "The film was a complete departure from the then-prevalent theatricality in acting, treatment and dialogue. Barua initiated a style of acting which was natural and unaffected; his method was to underplay, to convey emotion through the slightest tremor of the voice and use significant pauses between the dialogue to telling effect. The dialogue too, was simple, everyday speech, without dramatic flamboyance or literary flourish. The slow, soft and cleverly modulated dialogue became a hallmark not only of Barua’s but all of New Theatres’ films."

The Indian movie world was adorned with some excellent productions by Pramathesh Barua. But, his most celebrated work is Devdas. He played the title role in it, where the other stars were Biswanath Bhaduri, Uma Shashi, Kundan Saigal and Chandrabati. Raichand Boral was the music director. The story of Devdas was based on the novel of Sarat Chandra Chattopadhya of the same title. The novelist was so deeply moved by the film that tears rolled down his eyes and he opined that PC Barua’s Devdas was more distinctive than the Devdas of his own novel. Noted film critic Chidananda Das Gupta made a significant remark — "Pramathesh Barua did not merely make Devdas, but also came to be widely known as ‘Devdas’ rather than a Rajkumar (prince) ... His Devdas is a milestone in the film world of the subcontinent".

== Social and cultural impact ==
=== Political and social influence ===
The Directorate of Film Festivals had to borrow a copy of India's first film version of this from the Bangladesh High Commission in order to screen it during the Devdas retrospective here on Delhi on Oct 2002 at Delhi Film Festival. The film was sent through diplomatic bag by the Bangladesh government and the screening was conducted under strict vigil, no video clips, no photographs, no extracts on television — as the copyright belongs to the Bangladesh Film Archives. The film was screened to a full auditorium. The copyright of the film actually belongs to the New Theatre. The Indian prints of P.C. Barua’s Bengali version of the film, with Barua playing Devdas, were destroyed decades ago in a fire that ravaged New Theatre's studios. Currently, there is only one copy of the film which belongs to the Bangladesh Film Archives. And that too is with almost 40 percent of it destroyed.

This version, which was screened here after a long gap, retained only parts of the classic and had very poor sound quality. P.K Nair, Director, Film Archives, says the Archives traced the presence of the copy in the 1970s and requested the Bangladesh Film Archives to allow India to restore the film and make a copy of it.

But that's not the only missing classic from India's repertoire, says Nair. According to him, the Archives has traced a number of copies of Indian classic of the 1930s and 1940s in countries like Pakistan, Algeria and many more. And these are copies of films which can no longer be found in India. Almost 70 percent of the films made before the 1950s will not be available any more.

== See also ==
- Devdas (1936 film) - Barua's Hindi version
- Devdas (1937 film) - Barua's Assamese version
- List of incomplete or partially lost films
