= Devdas (1937 film) =

- Directed by: Pramathesh Barua
- Screenplay by: Pramathesh Barua
- Based on: Devdas by Sharat Chandra Chattopadhyay
- Starring: Phani Sarma; Zubeida; Mohini
- Release date: 1937
- Country: India
- Language: Assamese

Devdas is a 1937 Assamese film based on the Sharat Chandra Chattopadhyay novella, Devdas. Directed by Pramathesh Barua, it stars Phani Sarma as Devdas, Mohini as Chandramukhi, and Zubeida as Paro. The songs were playbacked by Shamshad Begum and Bhupen Hazarika. This was Barua's last of three language versions of the film based on Chattopadhyay's novella, the first being in Bengali and the second in Hindi.

== Plot summary ==
The childhood friendship of Devdas (Phani Sarma) (who is from a wealthy family) and Paro (Zubeida) (whose family is not as well off) blossoms into love as they grow up. Devdas' father does not approve of the relationship due to differences in their families' status in the village and of their castes. (Devdas is of the Brahmin caste and Paro of the Merchant caste.)

Devdas realizes he cannot live without Paro and seeks her out, but she has already been married off to an older man with children. Devdas falls into despair and drinks to excess; then he meets a courtesan, Chandramukhi (Mohini), who falls in love with him and looks after him. During his alcohol-instilled dreams, he frequently dreams of Paro and Chandramukhi. The two women replace each other in his dreams, so it is left unclear, if, in the end, Devdas overcomes his love for Paro and finds some peace by falling in love with Chandramukhi. Devdas returns to meet Paro, but dies at her doorstep before seeing her.

== Cast ==
- Phani Sarma as Devdas (Debdax)
- Zubeida as Paro
- Mohini as Chandramukhi

== See also ==
- Devdas (1935 film) – Barua's Bengali version
- Devdas (1936 film) – Barua's Hindi version
