= Pramathesh Barua =

Indian actor and film director (1903–1951)

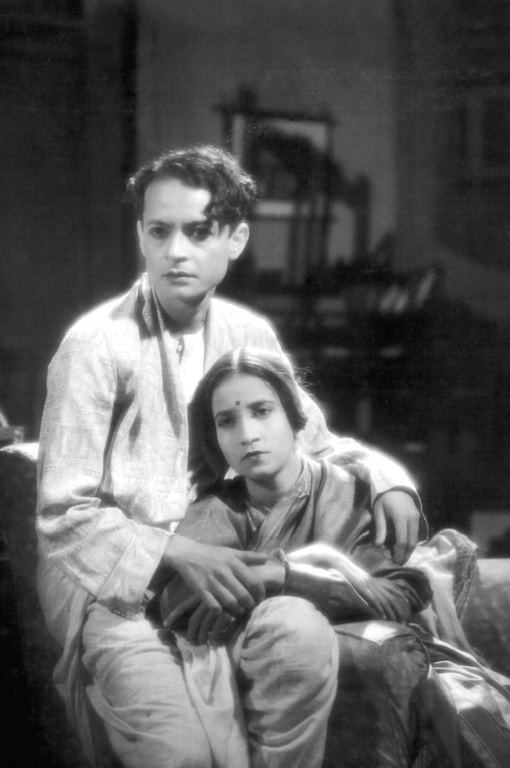
- Pramathesh Barua and Jamuna Barua in Devdas (1935)
- Born: Pramatesh Chandra Barua; 24 October 1903; Gauripur, Dhubri, Assam, British India
- Died: 29 November 1951 (aged 48); Calcutta, West Bengal, India
- Spouse(s): Jamuna Barua Madhuri Lata; Amalabala

Pramathesh Chandra Barua (24 October 1903 – 29 November 1951) was an Indian actor, director, and screenwriter of Indian films in the pre-independence era, born in Gauripur, Dhubri, Assam.

== Early life ==
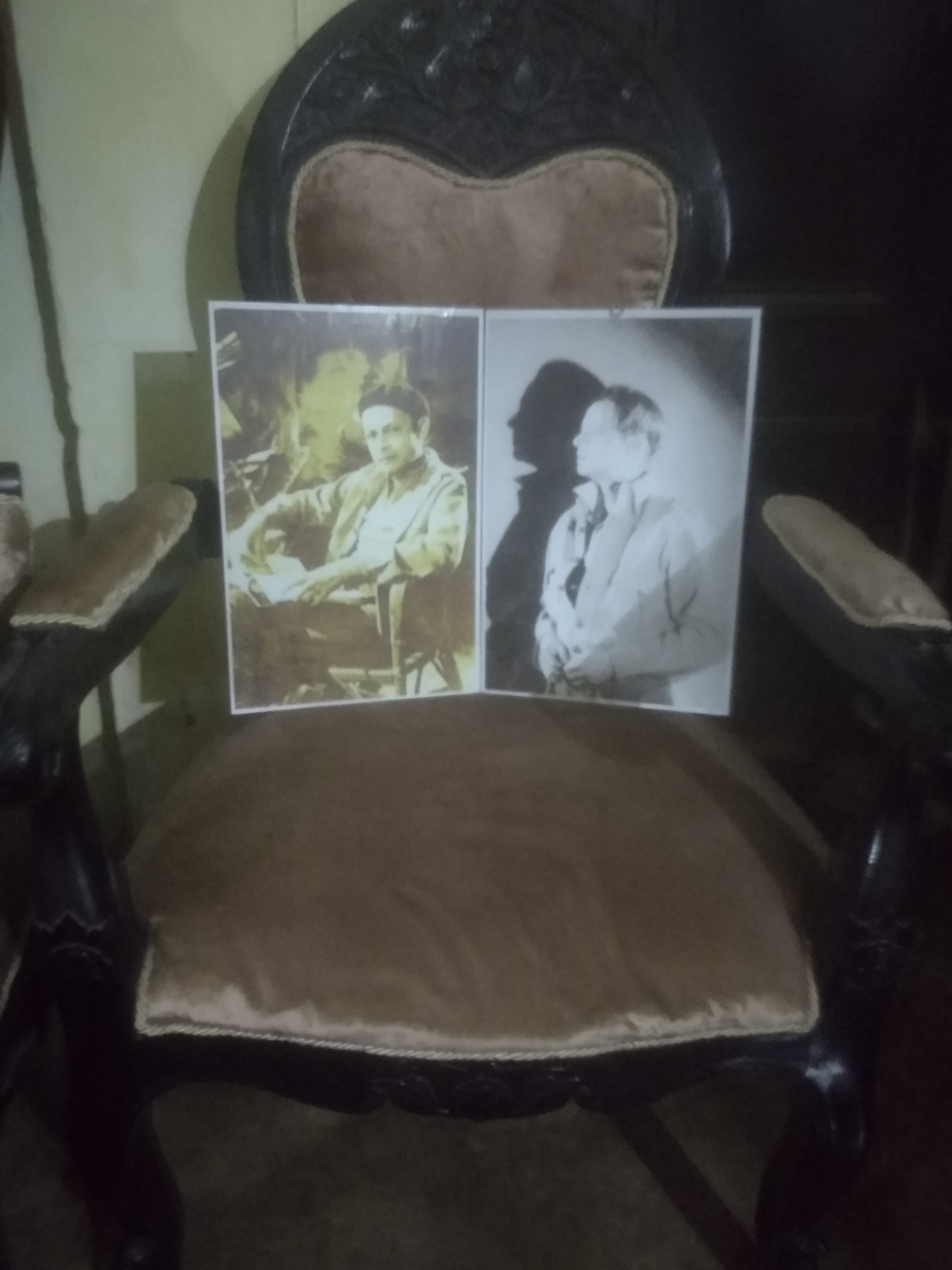
The chair of Pramthesh Barua, one of the directors and actors of Indian cinema preserved in Rajbari, Gauripur

Barua was the son of the royal family of Gauripur (belongs to Gauripur Rajvansh), Dhubri, Assam. His father Raja Prabhat Chandra Barua was a zamindar of Gauripur, Assam and mother Sorojbala. Pramathesh Barua was born in Gauripur and spent his childhood there. He studied at Hare School, Calcutta and then Bachelor of Science graduated from Presidency College, Calcutta in 1924. At age 18, while still studying in college, he got married. It was arranged by the family. He had two more marriages. His third wife was film actress Jamuna Barua. One of his wives, either Madhuri Lata or Amalabala, and singer Meena Kapoor's mother were sisters. In other words, one of his wives was Meena Kapoor's aunt. After his graduation, he travelled to Europe, where he received his first exposure to films. After returning, he served for a time in the Assam Legislative Assembly and joined the Swaraj Party but ultimately moved to Calcutta and later began a career in films, much to the chagrin of his father.

== Career ==
Pramathesh Barua's stepping into the world of films was accidental. He was introduced to Dhirendranath Ganguly during his stay in Shantiniketan. Pramathesh Barua started his film career in 1926 as a member of British Dominion Films Ltd. In 1929, he appeared for the first time on the silver screen in a film named Panchashar which was directed by Debaki Kumar Bose. He also acted in Takay Ki Na Hay, another film directed by Dhiren Ganguly.

Around this time, an actress of the silent era named Irish Gasper (Screen Name: Sabita Devi) urged Pramathesh Barua to go independent and build his own studio. Pramathesh Barua wanted to go to Europe and get a practical knowledge of the art and craft of film-making. In 1930, his father Raja Prabhat Chandra Barua sent Pramathesh to England for the removal of a kidney stone. After the successful operation, he went to Paris with a letter of introduction from Rabindranath Tagore and met M Rogers. He received thorough training in cinematography in Paris. He learned a lot about lighting in studios at the Fox Studio. He also observed the production of Elstree Studios in London.

He returned to Calcutta after purchasing lighting equipment and set up Barua Film Unit and Barua Studio in his own residence in Calcutta. He then made the first film Apradhi (1931) where he was the main lead role and it was directed by Debaki Kr. Bose. Apradhi is a very important film in the history of Indian cinema as it was the first Indian film that was shot under artificial lights. Prior to that Indian films were shot with the help of reflected sunrays. While using artificial lights, he also made necessary changes in the makeup process to suit the lighting. This experimentation led to a wastage of 50,000 feet of 'picture negative' and another 1,000 feet of 'picture negative' was wasted with experimentation of make-up of artists. Apradhi thus brought radical changes to the technical environment for Directors in Indian cinema.

In 1932, he produced films like Nisher Dak and Ekada. The story of Ekada was written by him and it was directed by Sushit Mazumder. He played a villain in the film Bhagyalakshmi which was directed by Kali Prasad Ghosh for Indian Cinema Arts.

In 1932, when the talkie era came he made his first talkie named Bengal-1983. Released by Rabindranath Tagore, it was a brave attempt by him due to the subject matter. It was shot in 8 days, which showed the tenacity and single-mindedness of Pramathesh Barua. The film was a disaster which left Barua with no choice but wind up his company.

In 1933, he was invited by BN Sarkar to join New Theatres and this led him to the zenith of his career as a film-maker. He excelled in all technical aspects of film-making – direction, acting, script writing, photograph composition, editing or any other necessary skills. He now directed Rooplekha, the first talkie of New Theatres, and also played the lead role opposite Umashashi. Released in 1934, Rooplekha introduced another new technique. For the first time in Indian cinema, flashback was used for storytelling.

Pramathesh-Barua then came to Devdas. It was not the first time that Sarat Chandra Chatterjee's tragic hero of the Bengali classic was adapted in Indian films, but Barua's portrayal of Devdas was so lively that the made the tragic hero a legend. He directed both the Bengali and Hindi versions and played the lead role in the Bengali version. It has been said that Pramathesh Barua's lifestyle made it possible for him to act the role of Devdas so convincingly. Devdas was released in 1935 and it was an instant commercial success. Cine scholars have said that it was the first successful social film in India and it changed the entire outlook of Indian social pictures. Devdas was also admired by cine scholars for the appropriate use of 'flashback', 'closeup', 'montage', 'wipe','dissolve', and 'fade-in and fade-out'. Devdas is also considered a landmark in the world cinema for the introduction of the technique of 'intercut telepathy shot'.

Mukti was another bold film made by Pramathesh Barua. Mukti was the modern version of Devdas depicting the nostalgia of a man. The film was shot in the backdrop of the scenic beauty of Assam. Rabindra Sangeet was first used successfully in the film. Pankaj Mallik also composed the music for one of the poems of Rabindranath Tagore, 'Diner Sheshe ghumer Deshe'. Another important aspect of this film was that a major part of the film was shot outdoors. It took almost two decades after this film that realistic filmmakers were more interested to shoot outdoors.

In most of his previous films, Pramathesh Barua had a tragic hero. But, in 1939, he made a movie Rajat Jayanti that made people burst out with laughter. This film is considered to be the first Indian comedy talkie. In the same year, he made Adhikaar which ushered new thoughts in Indian cinema. His social criticism reached such an extent that the film advocated class struggle. The use of symbolism was highly admired. Pramathesh Barua also made a brave attempt by trying to blend Indian classical music with a Western symphony. Encouraged by him, Timirbaran performed the blending successfully which was thought to be nearly impossible.

In 1940, Pramathesh Barua made Shapmukti for Krishna Movietone. Shapmukti greatly appealed to viewers tremendously for its highly tragic scenes. The film ended with 3 death sequences which Barua depicted with 'cut-shot' technique. Noted French film critic Georges Sadoul highly admired Pramathesh Barua for his brilliant use of 'cut-shot' technique which was also a pioneering effort in the early days of Indian cinema.

His film Uttrayan which was released in 1941 was also a path-breaking film in its own right. Prior to this film, stories of Indian films would start after the credits.

Although, Barua's breakthrough with New Theatres came with Devdas in 1935. The film was first made in Bengali, with Barua himself in the title role; he then remade it in Hindi as the 1936 film Devdas, with K.L. Saigal as the leading man. The Hindi version became a craze all throughout India; it cemented Barua as a top-notch director and Saigal as the top-notch hero of Indian films. The Devdas (Assamese) was Barua's last of three language versions. Barua followed up Devdas with Manzil in 1936, Mukti in 1937, Adhikar in 1938, Rajat Jayanti in 1939, and Zindagi (which reunited him with Saigal) in 1940. Phani Majumdar who later became a noted film director in his own right, started his film career with Barua at New Theatres.

Barua's films were photographed by Bimal Roy, who would later become an accomplished director in his own right.

Barua left New Theatres in 1939 and freelanced thereafter. However, of his post-New Theatres films, only Shesh Uttar/Jawab (1942) stood out. He planned an Indian version of The Way of All Flesh, but it never materialised. He took to drinking heavily, and his health began to decline; he died in 1951.

== Filmography ==
K.L. Saigal and Jamuna Barua in Devdas, P.C. Barua's 1936 Hindi version.

=== Director ===
1. Bengal 1983 (1932)
2. Roop Lekha/Mohabbat Ki Kasauti (1934)
3. Devdas (1935)
4. Maya (1936/II)
5. Maya (1936/I)
6. Manzil (1936)
7. Grihadah (1936)
8. Devdas (1936)
9. Devdas (1937)
10. Mukti (1937/II)
11. Mukti (1937/I)
12. Adhikar (1938)
13. Rajat Jayanti (1939)
14. Adhikar (1939)
15. Zindagi (1940)
16. Shap Mukti (1940)
17. Mayer Pran (1941)
18. Uttarayan (1941)
19. Jawab (1942)
20. Shesh Uttar (1942)
21. Rani (1943)
22. Chander Kalanka (1944)
23. Subah Shyam (1944)
24. Ameeree (1945)
25. Pehchan (1946)
26. Iran Ki Ek Raat (1949)
27. Maya Kanan (1953)

=== Actor ===
1. Maya kanan (1953)
2. Subah Shyam (1944)
3. Chander Kalanka (1944)
4. Rani (1943)
5. Jawab (1942) .... Manoj
6. Sesh Uttar (1942).... Manoj
7. Uttarayan (1941) .... Salil
8. Mayer Pran (1941) .... Satish
9. Shap Mukti (1940) .... Ramesh
10. Adhikar (1939) .... Nikhilesh
11. Rajat Jayanti (1939) .... Rajat
12. Adhikar (1938) .... Nikhilesh
13. Mukti (1937/I) .... Prasant
14. Mukti (1937/II) .... Prasanta
15. Grihadah (1936) .... Mahim
16. Manzil (1936) .... Mahim
17. Devdas (Hindi) (1935)....Mohan
18. Devdas (1935) .... Devdas
19. Roop Lekha (1934) .... Arup in the Bengali version
20. Bengal 1983 (1932)
21. Aparadhi (1931)
22. Charitraheen (1931)
23. Takay Ki Na Hay (1931)

=== Writer ===
1. Adhikar (1939) (writer)
2. Rajat Jayanti (1939) (writer)
3. Adhikar (1938) (writer)
4. Mukti (1937/I) (writer)
5. Mukti (1937/II) (writer)
6. Devdas (1936 film) (writer)
7. Maya (1936/I) (writer)
8. Maya (1936/II) (writer)
9. Devdas (1935 film) (writer)
10. Ekada (1932) (screenplay) (story)

=== Cinematographer ===
1. Zindagi (1940)

== Bibliography ==
- Chatterji, Shoma (2008). P. C. Barua. Delhi: Wisdom Tree. ISBN 978-81-8328-104-1.
