= Devdas (1979 film) =

1979 Indian film

- Directed by: Dilip Roy
- Written by: Sarat Chandra Chattopadhyay
- Produced by: Sunil Ram
- Starring: Soumitra Chatterjee; Sumitra Mukherjee; Supriya Choudhury; Uttam Kumar
- Release date: 1979
- Running time: 153 minutes
- Country: India
- Language: Bengali

Devdas is a 1979 Indian Bengali-language epic period drama film based on Sarat Chandra Chattopadhyay's 1917 novel Devdas. The film stars Soumitra Chatterjee, Uttam Kumar, Sumitra Mukherjee, and Supriya Choudhury. The lyrics for the film's songs were written by Kazi Nazrul Islam.

== Cast ==
- Soumitra Chatterjee as Devdas
- Uttam Kumar as Chunnilal
- Supriya Choudhury as Chandramukhi
- Sumitra Mukherjee as Parbati
