= Amara Kaaviyam (1981 film) =

- Theatrical release poster
- Directed by: Amirtham
- Screenplay by: A. L. Narayanan
- Based on: Muqaddar Ka Sikandar by Laxmikant Sharma
- Produced by: Gopi
- Starring: Sivaji Ganesan; Sripriya; Madhavi
- Cinematography: Gajendramani
- Edited by: B. Kandhasamy
- Music by: M. S. Viswanathan
- Production company: Viswanathan Combines
- Release date: 14 April 1981
- Country: India
- Language: Tamil

Amara Kaaviyam (transl. Immortal Masterpiece) is a 1981 Indian Tamil-language film directed by Amirtham and written by A. L. Narayanan. The film stars Sivaji Ganesan, Sripriya and Madhavi. It is a remake of the 1978 Hindi film Muqaddar Ka Sikandar. The film was released on 14th April Chithirai 1 Tamil Puthandu 1981.

== Plot ==
A young orphan gets a job working for Ramanathan and quickly develops a strong attachment to his boss's daughter, Aruna. However, Ramanathan is displeased with this and fires the young boy. Saraswathi meets the boy, adopts him, and names him Raja. Coincidentally, Saraswathi also works for Ramanathan, and Raja is thrilled to reunite with Aruna. Unfortunately, at Aruna's birthday party, Raja is falsely accused of theft, resulting in Saraswathi losing her job. Tragically, Saraswathi dies due to a heart ailment, but Raja promises to care for his adopted sister Lalitha.

Fifteen years later, Raja has become a wealthy man by catching smugglers and collecting the rewards. In contrast, Ramanathan is struggling financially. Aruna still believes Raja is a thief and wants nothing to do with him. Heartbroken, Raja turns to excessive drinking and finds solace in his friendship with a dancer Kanchana. Aruna perceives his drunken behavior as further evidence of his character flaws. Although Kanchana falls in love with Raja, she realizes that he will always carry a torch for Aruna.

Raja befriends an unemployed lawyer named Ananth, and their bond becomes inseparable. As Ramanathan and Aruna discover Raja's secret financial assistance, they grow closer to him. Strengthened by this newfound closeness, Raja arranges a job for Ananth with Ramanathan. He also gains the confidence to confess his love for Aruna and turns to Ananth to write the love letter since he is illiterate. Unfortunately, Aruna misinterprets the letter as a love confession from Ananth and falls for him. Unaware of Raja's true feelings, Ananth also develops feelings for Aruna.

Chinnadurai, a criminal with a soft spot for Kanchana, hears rumors about her closeness to Raja and sets out to kill him. Furthermore, Lalitha's wedding is jeopardized when her prospective in-laws learn about Raja's association with Kanchana. The film reaches its climax as Raja must confront all of his various problems simultaneously.

== Cast ==
- Sivaji Ganesan as Raja
- Sripriya as Kanchana
- Madhavi as Aruna
- Nagesh as Devdas
- Jai Ganesh as Ananth
- Major Sundarrajan as Ramanathan
- Sukumari as Saraswathi
- Pushpalatha as Ananth's mother
- Tiger Prabhakar as Chinnadurai
- J. Lalitha as Lalitha
- Ceylon Manohar as Diwakar
- Ramadas as Bairava

== Production ==
Amara Kaaviyam is a remake of the 1978 Hindi film Muqaddar Ka Sikandar. Sivaji Ganesan was chosen to reprise the role originally played by Amitabh Bachchan, while his son Prabhu was to have reprised the role originally played by Amjad Khan, in what would have been his debut film. Because Ganesan's friends felt the bloodshed between these two characters would not be appreciated by the audience, Prabhu could not play the role. Sripriya reprised the role enacted by Rekha in the original version.

== Soundtrack ==
The soundtrack was composed by M. S. Viswanathan, while the lyrics were penned by Kannadasan and Vaali.

Song	Singers
"Selvame Ore Murai"	S. P. Sailaja
"Selvame Ore Murai"	T. M. Soundararajan
"Idhayam Pesinal"	Vani Jairam
"Than Vanathai Theduthu Oru Nilavu"	S. Janaki, S. P. Balasubrahmanyam
"Kadhal Andha Moondrezhuthu Inikkum"	S. Janaki, S. P. Balasubrahmanyam, L. R. Eswari
"Vaaya Raja"	P. Susheela

== Reception ==
Sindhu Jeeva of Kalki wrote although the story is complicated, it is boring without interesting twists.
