= Mukti (1937 film) =

- Mukti
- Directed by: Pramathesh Barua
- Written by: Pramathesh Barua, Sajanikanta Das, Ajoy Bhattacharya, A.H. Shore
- Starring: Pramathesh Barua, Kanan Devi, Menaka, Nawab, Amar Mullick, Sailen Choudhary, Ahi Sanyal, Jagdish Sethi, Bikram Kapoor, Pankaj Mullick, Indu Mukherjee, Kanak Narayan, Bibhuti Chakraborty, Kashi Choudhury, Jatin Dey, Sardeb Ray, Sukumar, Sudhir, Laxmi
- Cinematography: Bimal Roy
- Edited by: Kali Raha
- Music by: Composer: Pankaj Mullick; Lyricist: Sajanikanta Das, Rabindranath Tagore, Ajoy Bhattacharya, A.H. Shore, Arzoo
- Production company: New Theatres
- Release date: 18 September 1937
- Running time: 115 minutes
- Country: India
- Languages: Hindi, Bengali
- Budget: Rs. 3,00,000
- Box office: Rs. 7,48,200

Mukti is a 1937 Indian Hindi and Bengali-language drama film, directed by Pramathesh Barua and produced by New Theatres.

== Plot ==
An artist, Prasanta (Barua) is dedicated to his art. He pays little heed to gossip about him arising from the fact that he paints nude female forms. His conservative and rich father-in-law is unhappy with his cavalier attitude towards propriety. Prasanta, annoyed by his interference, aggravates him intentionally. Prasanta's rich young wife Chitra (Kanan Devi) loves him earnestly, but neither is willing to adjust to the other's lifestyle and behavior. Eventually, the marriage falls apart. Prasanta concedes to his wife's demand for a divorce and leaves for the jungles of Assam. There he meets the friendly Jharna (Menaka), the wife of an innkeeper named Pahari (P. Mullick/S.Nawab) and raises a wild elephant calf. He also makes a sworn enemy of a local trader (J.sethi/A. Mullick). Chitra marries a rich man named Bipul and they go on an elephant hunt. They end up killing Prasanta's pet elephant. Chitra believes Prasanta to be dead. To keep up the falsehood, Prasanta avoids meeting her. But he is forced to rescue her from the lecherous trader. Prasanta dies in the process leaving Chitra devastated. But both of them finally gain mukti (freedom) from their ill-fated love.

== Cast ==
Bengali Version

- Pramathesh Barua
- Kanan Devi
- Pankaj Mullick
- Menaka Devi
- Amar Mullick
- Shailen Chowdhury
- Indu Mukhopadhyay
- Devabala
- Prafulla Roy
- Ahi Sanyal

Hindi Version

- Pramathesh Barua
- Kanan Devi
- S.M. Nawab
- Menaka Devi
- Jagdish Sethi
- Pankaj Mullick
- Bikram Kapoor
- Prafulla Roy
- Ahi Sanyal
- Devabala
