= Devdas (2013 film) =

- Theatrical release poster
- Directed by: Chashi Nazrul Islam
- Screenplay by: Chashi Nazrul Islam; Dialogue Keshav Chattopadhyay
- Based on: Devdas by Sarat Chandra Chattopadhyay
- Produced by: Faridur Reza Sagor
- Starring: Shakib Khan; Moushumi; Apu Biswas
- Cinematography: Lal Mohammad; ZH Mintu
- Edited by: Atiqur Rahman Mallick
- Music by: Emon Saha
- Production company: Impress Telefilm
- Distributed by: Ashirbad Chalochitra
- Release date: 15 February 2013
- Running time: 150 minutes
- Country: Bangladesh
- Language: Bengali

Devdas (Note: Bengali: দেবদাস, romanized: Debdās [d̪ebd̪aʃ]) is a 2013 Bangladeshi romantic period drama film based on the Sharat Chandra Chattopadhyay novel Devdas. The film is directed by Chashi Nazrul Islam, who also directed the 1982 version and produced by Faridur Reza Sagar under the banner of his Impress Telefilm, also based on the 1917 novel of the same name by Chattopadhyay. The film is set in the early 1900s and follows Shakib Khan as Devdas Mukherjee, a wealthy law graduate who returns from Calcutta after 13 years to marry his childhood sweetheart, Paro, played by Apu Biswas. However, the opposition to this marriage by his own family sparks his descent into alcoholism, ultimately leading to his emotional deterioration and him seeking refuge with a courtesan, Chandramukhi, played by Moushumi.

It is the second Bangladeshi and eighth Bengali version with this story, also first coloured Bengali language version of Devdas. It is Impress Telefilm's fiftieth film and twelfth adaptation of Devdas. It is the final film starring Ferdousi Ahmed Lina. It was released on 15 February 2013 to positive response from critics, and a good opening at the box office and Moushumi won her second National Film Award for Best Actress and Runa Laila and Sabina Yasmin jointly won their sixth and thirteenth National Film Award for Best Female Playback Singer respectively at the 38th National Film Awards and Moushumi nominated for Best Actress in popular choice category at the 16th Meril-Prothom Alo Awards.

== Plot ==
Devdas is a young man from a wealthy Bengali Brahmin family in the Bengal Presidency in the early 20th century. Paro (Parvati) is a young woman from a middle-class Bengali family belonging to the merchant caste. The two families lived in a village in Bengal, and Devdas and Paro were childhood friends. Devdas goes away for thirteen years to live and study in a boarding school in the city of Calcutta (now Kolkata). When, after finishing school, he returns to his village, Paro looks forward to their childhood love blossoming into their lifelong journey together in marriage. Of course, according to the prevailing social custom, Paro's parents would have to approach Devdas' parents and propose marriage of Paro to Devdas as Paro longed for. When Paro's mother makes the proposal to Devdas' mother, the latter insults her, plainly saying that the marriage is not possible in view of her own higher caste and financial status. To demonstrate her own social status, Paro's mother then finds an even richer husband for Paro. When Paro learns of her planned marriage, she stealthily meets Devdas at night, desperately believing that Devdas will quickly accept her hand in marriage. Devdas meekly seeks his parents' permission to marry Paro, but Devdas' father agrees with his wife. In a weak-minded state, Devdas then flees to Calcutta, and from there, he writes a letter to Paro, saying that they were only friends. Within days, however, he realizes that he should have been bolder. He goes back to his village and tells Paro that he is ready to do anything needed to save their love. By now, Paro's marriage plans are at an advanced stage, and she declines going back to Devdas and chides him for his cowardice and vacillation. She makes, however, one request to Devdas that he would return to her before he dies. Devdas vows to do so. Devdas goes back to Calcutta and Paro is married off to the betrothed widower with children, who is still in love with his previous wife and is therefore not interested in an amatory relationship with Paro. In Calcutta, Devdas' carousing friend, Chunnilal, introduces him to a courtesan (tawaif) named Chandramukhi. Devdas takes to heavy drinking at Chandramukhi's place, but the courtesan falls in love with him, and looks after him. His health deteriorates because of a combination of excessive drinking and despair of life a drawn-out form of suicide. Within him, he frequently compares Paro and Chandramukhi, remaining ambivalent as to whom he really loves. Sensing his fast-approaching death, Devdas returns to meet Paro to fulfill his vow. He dies at her doorstep on a dark, cold night. On hearing of the death of Devdas, Paro runs towards the door, but her family members prevent her from stepping out of the door.

== Cast ==
- Shakib Khan as Devdas Mukherjee
- Moushumi as Chandramukhi
- Apu Biswas as Parvati
- Shahiduzzaman Selim as Chunnilal "Chunni babu"
- Shirin Bokul as Parvati's Mother
- Lina Ahmed as Devdas's Mother
- Ahmed Sharif as Devdas's Father

== Production ==
Apu Biswas in an interview with The Daily Star said about her character Parbati in the film,

It is one of the main characters in the novel. Debdas slowly goes through self-destruction when Parbati marries another man. It was a challenge to portray the role, as the character is so well known to the audience. Pressure was also there because a very talented actress of our country had already played Parbati before me.

Director Chashi Nazrul Islam made a film based on Sarat Chandra Chattopadhyay's novel Devdas in 1982 of the same name, where prominent actor Bulbul Ahmed played the title role and Sarah Begum Kabori played as Parbati. After almost 30 years of the film production, he took the initiative to re-made of the film based on the same novel to inform the new generation, where Shakib Khan will casting as the title role, Apu Biswas as Parbati, Moushumi as Chandramukhi and Shahiduzzaman Selim as Chunilal. Chashi Nazrul Islam signed Apu Biswas on a Bangladeshi 10 taka note. In this regard, Apu Biswas told on RisingBD, "I always wanted to work with Chashi sir. One day Chashi sir called me to FDC. I met him at FDC. At that time he proposed me to play the role of Parbati in the film Devdas. I agreed to his proposal. Chashi sir signed me on a note of ten tk and started working with me." The filming of Devdas was begun in 2010 with protagonists Shakib Khan, Apu Biswas, Moushumi and Shahiduzzaman Selim. According to a report published by Banglanews24.com on July 22, 2010 confirmed that, 90% shooting of the film has been completed in various locations including, Tangail, Gazipur and Dhaka of Bangladesh. The shooting of the film was completed at the end of 2010. The post-production work including editing and dubbing was completed in mid-January 2011.

The film was supposed to be released in 2011, but due to Film Censor Board problems, it failed to do so. Subsequently, in December 2012, it got clearance from Bangladesh Film Censor Board after editing out some scenes the board had shown concern about considering public sentiment. Scenes portraying Chunilal character wearing 'coatee', usually worn on Punjabi or kurta in the Indian subcontinent, "looked like a Mujib coat" (a kind of black waist coat used by the founding father of Bangladesh Sheikh Mujibur Rahman) to some members of the censor board and asked to cut those.

== Soundtrack ==
Devdas

Soundtrack album by Emon Saha
- Released: 2013
- Recorded: 2010
- Studio: Impress Telefilm
- Genre: Feature Film Soundtrack
- Language: Bengali
- Label: Impress Telefilm; CD Vision
- Producer: Emon Saha; Faridur Reza Sagar

Emon Saha chronology
Ghetuputra Komola (2012)	Devdas (2013)	Bhalobasha Aaj Kal (2013)

The soundtrack of the film composed by Emon Saha with lyrics penned by Gazi Mazharul Anwar and Mohammad Rafiquzzaman.

All music is composed by Emon Saha.

No.	Title	Lyrics	Singer(s)	Length
1.	"Ami Kandi, Shunte Ki Pao"		Bappa Mazumder	4:00
2.	"Ei Jibon Dhuper Motoi Gondho Bilay"		Runa Laila	6:05
3.	"Bhalobeshe, Ekbaro Kandale Na"		Sabina Yasmin
4.	"Amar Hariye Jawar Shesh Thikana"	Gazi Mazharul Anwar	Bappa Mazumdar, Shakila Zafar	4:48
Total length:				...

== Release ==
The film was initially planned to release on the Eid al-Fitr 2011, but was ultimately delayed due to incomplete pre-production work. Later, it was also scheduled to release on Durga Puja of the same year, though it did not release that time either.

The film's premiere show was organized on February 12, 2013 at Balaka Cineworld, Dhaka on the occasion of releasing of the film. It was released in 40 theaters nationwide on February 15, 2013 on the occasion of Valentine's Day. The film was released in both digital and 35mm formats. The film had its World Television Premiere on Channel i on the occasion of Eid al-Fitr 2013.

== Awards and nominations ==
=== National Film Awards ===
Year	Events	Category	Nominee	Works	Results	Ref
2013	National Film Awards	Best Actress	Moushumi		Won	
2013	National Film Awards	Best Female Playback Singer	Sabina Yasmin	"Bhalobeshe, Ekbaro Kandale Na"	Won	
2013	National Film Awards	Best Female Playback Singer	Runa Laila	"Ei Jibon Dhuper Motoi Gondho Bilay"	Won	

=== Meril-Prothom Alo Awards ===
Year	Events	Category	Nominee	Result	Ref
2013	Meril-Prothom Alo Awards	Best Film Actress	Moushumi	Won	

== Legacy ==
In an interview with Pricila, Apu Biswas mentioned Devdas as the best film in her career. Apu Biswas also said, "I enjoyed acting in this movie a lot. The funny thing about this movie is that I didn't have to use glycerin while doing the crying scenes here."
