= Parineeta (1942 film) =

- Directed by: Pashupati Chatterjee
- Written by: Sarat Chandra Chattopadhyay
- Release date: 1942
- Country: India
- Language: Bengali

Parineeta (English: Married woman) is 1942 Bengali film directed by Pashupati Chatterjee based on Sarat Chandra Chattopadhyay's 1914 novel of same name. The English title for the film is The Fiancée.

== Plot ==
The film is based on Parineeta, a famous Bengali novel by famous Indian author Sarat Chandra Chattopadhyay, which was first published in 1914.
