= Devadasu (1974 film) =

- Directed by: Vijaya Nirmala
- Screenplay by: Vijaya Nirmala
- Story by: Sarat Chandra Chattopadhyay
- Based on: Devdas by Sarat Chandra Chattopadhyay
- Produced by: S. Raghunath; Krishna (Presents)
- Starring: Krishna; Vijaya Nirmala
- Cinematography: VSR Swamy (W.I.C.A)
- Edited by: Kotagiri Gopala Rao
- Music by: Ramesh Naidu
- Production company: Sri Vijaya Krishna Movies
- Distributed by: Andhra, Seded, Nizam Sree films, Karnataka Movie Land Movies
- Release date: 6 December 1974
- Running time: 131 mins
- Country: India
- Language: Telugu

Devadasu is a 1974 Telugu romance film, with Krishna in the titular roll and directed by Vijaya Nirmala, who also plays Parvati, in her 100th film in lead role. It is based on Sarat Chandra Chattopadhyay's Devdas, produced by S. Raghunath and presented by Krishna under the Sri Vijaya Krishna Movies banner, with music composed by Ramesh Naidu. Kotagiri Gopala Rao edited the film, while V. S. R. Swamy provided the cinematography. The film was a commercial failure at the box office.

== Cast ==
- Krishna as Devadas
- Vijaya Nirmala as Parvati
- Jayanthi as Chandramukhi
- Jaggayya as Zamindar Narayana Rao
- Satyanarayana as Bhagawan
- Chandra Mohan as Mahendra / Mahi
- Allu Ramalingaiah as School teacher
- Gummadi as Zamindar Bhavana Babu
- M. Prabhakar Reddy as Doctor
- Kantha Rao as Neelakantham
- Sreedhar as Dijeen
- Mikkilineni as Dharmanna
- Karakala as Bullcart driver
- Jaya Prada as Jalaja
- Pandari Bai as Sharada Devi
- Krishna Kumari as Bhavani
- Girija
- Chhaya Devi
- Manimala as Manorama
- Nirmalamma as Parvati's grandmother
- Master Naresh as Young Devadas
- Baby Sumati as Young Parvati

== Soundtrack ==
Soundtrack composed by Ramesh Naidu is owned by Saregama music label. Lyrics were written by Aarudhra.

Track list
No.	Title	Singer(s)	Length
1.	"Kala Chedhirindhi"	S. P. Balasubrahmanyam	4:04
2.	"Idhi Nisheedha Samayam"	S. P. Balasubrahmanyam	4:44
3.	"Jeevitham Yemiti"	S. P. Balasubrahmanyam	4:29
4.	"Meghala Meedha"	S. P. Balasubrahmanyam	4:23
5.	"Poruginti Doragariki"	S. P. Balasubrahmanyam, P. Susheela	4:16
6.	"Ee Roju Chaala Manchi Roju"	P. Susheela	4:06
Total length:			26:05

== Reception ==
Devadasu was released on 6 December 1974. It opened with a tepid response in theatres. In 2022, Srivathsan Nadadhur of OTT Play wrote, "There are several theories surrounding the film's non-performance at the ticket window. While some claim that the film neither offered any new insight into the novel nor had any pathbreaking performances, another reason behind its failure is believed to be the re-release of ANR's Devadasu at the same time, that proved counterproductive to its fortunes."
