= Jamuna Barua =

Indian actress (1919–2005)

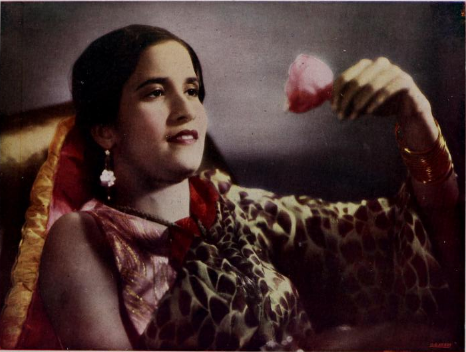
- Barua in Zindagi (1940)
- Born: Jamuna Gupta; 10 October 1919; Agra, United Provinces of Agra and Oudh, British India
- Died: 24 November 2005 (aged 86); Kolkata, West Bengal, India
- Years active: 1934–1953
- Spouse: Pramathesh Barua

Kundal Lal Saigal and Jamuna in Devdas, P.C. Barua's 1936 Hindi version.

Jamuna Barua (10 October 1919 – 24 November 2005) was a leading Indian actress.

== Early life ==
Jamuna was the fourth of the six daughters of Puran Gupta, a resident of a village near Agra, Uttar Pradesh, India. Each of the sisters was named after an Indian river like Ganga, Jamuna, Bhagirathi etc. As destiny would have it, Jamuna came to reside in Calcutta, a leading film producing city in India. Originally from Gauripur of Assam's Goalpara district (undivided), Jamuna was married to the legendary actor director Pramathesh Barua, or P.C. Barua, who died in 1950. She began her acting career in her husband's famous production Devdas in 1936 and was the film's lead character Parvati or Paro. She went on to make a number of memorable movies in [ Bengali and Hindi, notably Amiri, Mukti, Adhikar and Sesh Uttar. She stopped acting after Barua died.

== Film career ==
Jamuna made her film debut in the 1930s and played a small role in Mohabbat Ki Kasauti (1934), Hindi version of Rooplekha (Bengali) directed by P.C. Barua. A romance started although Barua, hailing from the native Indian state of Gauripur, Assam, was already twice married. As the actress, who was to play Parbati in Barua's next venture Devdas (1935) reported inability to attend the studio on the very first day of shooting, Jamuna was called from Barua's residence (she was living with him by then) and was asked to get down to work straight away without any preparation whatsoever. Thus she came to be the first Parbati of Indian talkies- Miss Light had played the role in the silent version of the enormously popular Sarat Chandra novel. Aishwarya Rai happens to the last so far and Devdas has been made and re-made a number of times. Jamuna played the same role in the Hindi version also and was accepted in this very first proper exposure as an actress in her own right. She continued to act in Barua's films like Grihadaha (1936), Maya (1936), Adhikar (1939), Uttarayan (1941), Shesh Uttar (1942), Chander Kalanka (1944) and the respective Hindi versions of each film. Barua had left the prestigious New Theatres in 1940 and was directing as well as producing his films. Thereafter she acted in a number of Barua directed Hindi movies like Amiree, Pehchan and Iran Ki Ek Raat. These films however did not add to the prestige of either to Barua or to Jamuna. Jamuna also acted outside Barua direction in three Bengali films Debar (1943) and Nilanguriya (1943) where she proved herself without Barua's influence. Her last film Malancha (1953) was also outside Barua's direction. She also starred in its Hindi version Phulwari (1953). Barua's death in 1951 when he was only 48 changed Jamuna's life altogether. She had three sons by Barua, Deb Kumar, Rajat and Prasun. They were all minors at the time and the Gauripur estate refused to take any of their responsibilities. She had to wage a legal battle with the powerful and influential royal family to get her and her children's dues and recognition. Time settled the matters and she was allowed ownership of the house with its vast adjoining land and also an allowance. Jamuna spent the rest of her life after Barua as a housewife, busy in bringing up her minor sons. She had to complete the unfinished film Malancha of course but bid adieu to the film industry soon after. Later in her life she did attend a number of functions to celebrate the centennial year of husband P.C. Barua and received felicitations on behalf of the Government of India and the state Government of Assam as the first Parbati of Indian talkies.

== Later life ==
Her last days were not very comfortable and she was bedridden for more than six months prior to her death. She is survived by her three sons and their families and a host of relatives. According to her family members, she had been ill for some time, and the cause of death was illness related to old age. She died at her residence in South Kolkata.

== Filmography ==
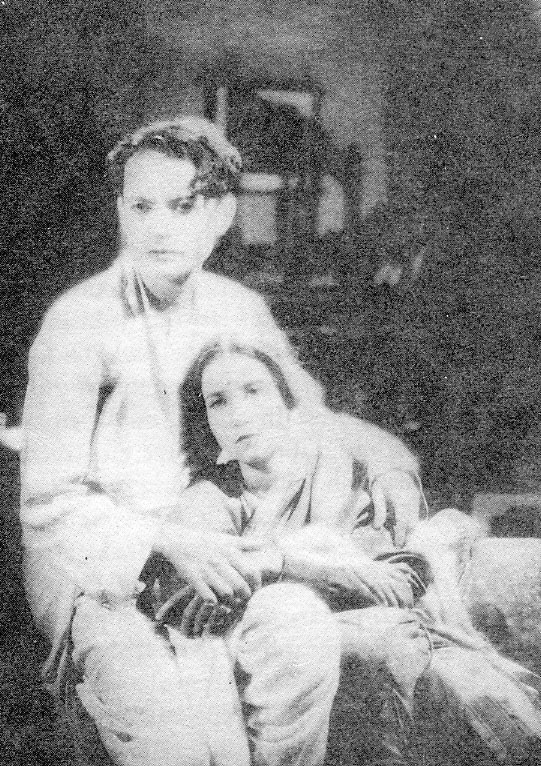
Pramathesh Barua and Jamuna Barua in Devdas (1935)

- Malancha [Bengali version] / Phulwari [Hindi version] (both 1953)
- Iran Ki Ek Raat (1949)
- Subah Shyam (1944)
- Chander Kalanka (1944)
- Devar (1943) .... Namita
- Rani (1943)
- Shesh Uttar (1942).... Reba
- Jawab (1942) .... Reba
- Uttarayan (1941) .... Arati
- Hindustan Hamara (1940) .... Veena
- Zindagi (1940) .... Shrimata
- Adhikar (1939) .... Indira
- Devdas (1936) .... Parvati / Paro
- Grihadah (1936) .... Achala
- Manzil (1936) .... Achala
- Maya (1936/I) .... Maya
- Maya (1936/II) .... Maya
- Devdas (1935) .... Parvati / Paro
- Roop Lekha (1934) /(Mohabbat Ki Kasauti in Hindi) .... Minor role in the Hindi version
