= Parineeta (novel) =

1914 Bengali language novel written by Sarat Chandra Chattopadhyay

Parineeta (The Married Woman)
- Author: Sarat Chandra Chattopadhyay
- Language: Bengali
- Genre: Novel
- Publisher: Roy M. C. Sarkar Bahadur & Sons
- Publication date: 1914
- Publication place: India
- Media type: Print (Hardback)

Parineeta (Bengali: পরিণীতা Porinita) is a 1914 Bengali language novel written by Sarat Chandra Chattopadhyay and is set in Calcutta, India during the early part of the 20th century. It is a novel of social protest which explores issues of that time period related to class and religion.

== Title ==
The word Parineeta is translated in English as married woman. The literal meaning comes from Bengali (Sanskrit) word "পরিণয়/परिणय/Parinay" - "marriage".

== Plot ==
Parineeta takes place at the turn of the 20th century during the Bengal Renaissance. The story centers around a poor 13-year-old orphan girl, Lalita, who lives with the family of her uncle Gurucharan. Gurucharan has five daughters, and the expense of paying for their weddings has impoverished him. He is forced to take a loan from his neighbour, Nabin Roy, by mortgaging a plot of land with him. The two neighbouring families share a very cordial relationship, although Nabin Roy covets Gurucharan's mortgaged plot. Nabin Roy's wife, Bhuvaneshwari, dotes on the orphan Lalita and showers love upon her; the latter reciprocates even to the extent of addressing Bhuvaneshwari as “maa” (mother). Roy's younger son Shekharnath (Shekhar), a 25-year-old, recently minted attorney, has a joking, bantering relationship with Lalita, his mother's protégée. The young girl adores him like her mentor, and for some strange reasons, accepts his possessive attitude towards her.

Upon the emergence of a supportive Girin in Lalita's life, a certain jealousy transpired within Shekhar, which tended to moderate Lalita's increasing associations with Girin, who has now extended his helping hand to Gurucharan's finances and also assisted him in finding a match for Lalita. These situations seemed to stir the instinctual passions of Shekhar and Lalita for each other. One evening before Shekhar's tour to the west, the duo secretly gets married. But a newly married Lalita had to conceal herself in the veil of her spinsterhood, as her uncle Gurucharan quits his fight with the law and orders of Hindu society and embraces Brahmoism, inspired from the angelic words of Girin. The society abandons them, and the same is followed by Shekhar towards Lalita upon his return (though mixed with covetousness over Girin's influence on her family). His jeopardies in introducing his wife amidst the society because of the differences in wealth, religion and, more importantly, due to a precluded marriage of marrying an under-aged woman made him harsh and arrogant towards Lalita who, drowned in agony, decides to accompany her family to Munger as a means of healing her psychologically tormented uncle anguished by the sense of isolation. Girin aided them all through his journey, to whom Gurucharan had his dying wish of marrying his daughter (suggestively indicated to his niece Lalita) which Girin accepts wholeheartedly.

Years pass with the passing of both Gurucharan and Nabin Roy and an 18-year-old Lalita visits her old place one last time for the sake of selling Gurucharan's house to Nabin Roy's heirs, since the deceased desired the plot for a long time. Shekhar has his marriage fixed in a week but Lalita's advent questions him over his real wishes; but he has heard of Girin's promise to marry Lalita which must have been fulfilled by now. Tables turn as Girin visits Shekhar with the legal documents of Gurucharan's plot; amidst the conversation, Girin reveals that he indeed became Gurucharan's son-in-law, but instead married Lalita's cousin Annakali, as Lalita claimed herself to be already married. Shockingly pleased by this, Shekhar regains himself and his now realised love for Lalita goes to his mother and confesses about his marriage with Lalita. The novella ends with consent for this marriage a declaration of union for Shekhar and Lalita.

== Characters ==
=== Lalita's family ===
- Lalita: the protagonist of the novella. Lalita came to live with her uncle's family after she was orphaned at the age of eight. At the beginning of the novella, she is thirteen years old and is close with her cousin Annakali (Kali) and her neighbor, Charubala (Charu). Lalita is considered a member of not only her uncle's family but of Charu's and of Shekhar's as well. Shekhar's mother Bhuvaneshwari is so attached to Lalita that she tells Lalita to call her 'maa'. At a time (1914) when young women were typically married at the age of thirteen, Lalita becomes the object of attraction between her neighbour Shekhar and Charu's uncle, Girin.
- Gurucharan: Lalita's uncle is a bank clerk with a small salary and five daughters, as well as Lalita, to support. He becomes impoverished due to his attempts to follow social custom and pay large dowries for the weddings of his daughters. Indeed, the marriage of his second daughter was paid for by Shekhar's father, Nabin. In lieu of returning the money with high interest, Gurucharan's house was mortgaged to Nabin.
- Lalita's aunt: She is never named in the novella and has only a minor role.
- Annakali or Kali: Gurucharan's ten-year-old daughter and Lalita's cousin and playmate. It is during Kali's imaginary "doll-wedding" that Lalita and Shekhar exchange garlands.

=== Shekhar Roy's family ===
- Shekhar: The youngest son of the Roy family, Shekhar is twenty-five years old. He has a master's degree as well as a law degree and is working as a teacher. From the time of her arrival to Gurucharan's house, Shekhar had taken an interest in Lalita's upbringing. While Shekhar contemplates marrying Lalita, he is restrained by social customs as well as by the resistance of his father who wants him to marry a wealthy woman with a large dowry.
- Nabin: Shekhar's father, who is a rich and an unscrupulous businessman. He becomes so enraged when Gurucharan's debt is repaid and when Gurucharan converts himself and his family to Brahmoism, that he builds a wall between the two houses.
- Bhuvaneshwari: Shekhar's mother, who is an advanced thinker. She wants Shekhar to choose his own wife rather than marry the woman whom Nabin selects. She also accepts Lalita as her daughter despite the difference in wealth and position.
- Abinash: Shekhar's married elder brother, a lawyer, who is mentioned in passing but never appears in the novella.

=== Charu's family ===
- Charubala or Charu: Lalita's neighbour and playmate. It is through her that Lalita gets introduced to Girin.
- Manoroma: Charu's mother and Girin's cousin. She is an active card player and involves Lalita in many card games.
- Girin: Manoroma's cousin and a university student who has been away for many years. He, as with the rest of the family, is a Brahmo, and convinces Gurucharan to convert himself (and his family). As a Brahmo, Gurucharan will no longer have to pay large dowries for the weddings of his daughters. In addition to repaying Gurucharan's loan, Girin repeatedly proves himself to be a man of integrity who acts according to the common good rather than his own self-interest.

== Translations ==
- 2005: English edition (Penguin India), translated by Malobika Chaudhuri, with an introduction by Swagato Ganguly .
- 1937: Gujarati edition
- 1934: Marathi edition

== Film adaptations ==
Parineeta has been adapted to film a number of times:

- Parineeta (1942 film), directed by Pashupati Chatterjee.
- Parineeta (1953 film), directed by Bimal Roy, starring Ashok Kumar and Meena Kumari.
- Manamalai (1958 Tamil Language film), directed by Ch. Narayana Rao, starring Gemini Ganesan and Savitri.
- Parineeta (1969 film), directed by Ajoy Kar, starring Soumitra Chatterjee and Moushumi Chatterjee.
- Sankoch (1976 film), directed by Anil Ganguly, starring Sulakshana Pandit and Jeetendra.
- Parineeta (1986 film), directed by Alamgir Kabir, starring Ilias Kanchan and Anjana Sultana.
- Parineeta (2005 film) (Bollywood version), directed by Pradeep Sarkar, based upon a screenplay by Vidhu Vinod Chopra, starring Sanjay Dutt, Saif Ali Khan, and Vidya Balan.
- Parineeta (2019 Bengali Language movie), directed by Raj Chakraborty.
- Parineeta (2024 Bengali Language Web Series By Hoichoi OTT), directed by Aditi Roy.

== See also ==
- Debdas/Devdas, 1917 (written in 1901)
- Nashtanir - contemporary novel
- Bengal Renaissance
