= Devdas (1982 film) =

- Directed by: Chashi Nazrul Islam
- Based on: Devdas by Sharat Chandra Chattopadhyay
- Starring: Bulbul Ahmed; Kabori Sarwar; Anwara Begum; Rahman
- Music by: Khondokar Nurul Alam
- Release date: 1982

Devdas is a Bengali-language film based on the 1917 Sharat Chandra Chattopadhyay novel Devdas. It was the first Bangladeshi version of the story and the first colour film version in Bangladesh. It was the first of two versions directed by Chashi Nazrul Islam.

== Cast ==
- Bulbul Ahmed as Devdas
- Kobori as Parboti
- Anwara Begum as Chandramukhi
- Rahman as Chunilal
- Anwar Hossain as Dharmadas
- Golam Mustafa

== Soundtrack ==
The music was composed by Khondokar Nurul Alam, with lyrics penned by Md. Rafikujjaman and sung by Runa Laila, Sabina Yasmin and Subir Nandi.
