= Devdas (1928 film) =

1928 film

- Directed by: Naresh Mitra
- Written by: Sharat Chandra Chattopadhyay
- Produced by: Eastern Films Syndicate
- Starring: Phani Burma; Tarakbala; Niharbala
- Release date: 11 February 1928
- Country: India
- Language: Silent film

Devdas is a 1928 silent film based on the Sharat Chandra Chattopadhyay's epic novel, Devdas. It was the first film adaptation of the 1917 novel. It was directed by Naresh Mitra who not only acted in the film but was also the cinematographer. The film was shot in erstwhile Calcutta in British India.

== Cast ==
- Phani Burma as Devdas
- Tarakbala as Parbati (Paro)
- Parulbala as Chandramukhi
- Naresh Mitra
- Mani Ghosh
- Tinkari Chakraborty
- Kanaknarayan Bhup
