= Devdas (1955 film) =

1955 Hindi film directed by Bimal Roy

- Theatrical release poster
- Directed by: Bimal Roy
- Written by: Screenplay: Nabendu Ghosh; Dialogue: Rajinder Singh Bedi
- Based on: Devdas by Sarat Chandra Chattopadhyay
- Produced by: Bimal Roy
- Starring: Dilip Kumar; Suchitra Sen; Vyjayanthimala; Motilal
- Narrated by: Bimal Roy
- Cinematography: Kamal Bose
- Music by: S. D. Burman
- Production company: Bimal Roy Productions
- Distributed by: Bimal Roy Production; Mohan Films
- Release date: 30 December 1955
- Running time: 155 minutes
- Country: India
- Language: Hindi
- Budget: ₹5 million

Devdas is a 1955 Indian Hindi-language period drama film directed by Bimal Roy, based on the 1917 Sarat Chandra Chattopadhyay novel Devdas. It starred Dilip Kumar in the title role, Suchitra Sen in her Bollywood debut as Parvati "Paro" and Vyjayanthimala in her first dramatic role as a tawaif named Chandramukhi. Motilal, Nazir Hussain, Murad, Pratima Devi, Iftekhar, Shivraj co-starred, along with Pran and Johnny Walker in extended cameo appearances.

In 2005, Indiatimes Movies ranked the movie amongst the Top 25 Must See Bollywood Films. Bimal Roy's Devdas was also ranked at #2 on the University of Iowa's List of Top 10 Bollywood Films. The film was also noted for its cinematography and lighting by Kamal Bose. Forbes included Kumar's performance in the film on its list, "25 Greatest Acting Performances of Indian Cinema". Although Devdas was a moderate success at the box-office when initially released, partly due to its heavy themes, and the release of several Kumar's films around the same time including Azaad (1955), Uran Khatola (1955), and Insaniyat (1955), it found greater success in re-releases in subsequent years. The subsequent popularity of the film made the role one of Kumar's most famous. It is considered to be the best-known cinematic rendering of the novel.

== Plot ==
Devdas is a young man from a Minor Zamindar Bengali family in India in the rural Bengal of the early 1900s. Parvati, known as Paro, is a young woman from a lower caste but middle-class Bengali Brahmin family with less affluence and status. The two families live in a village, and Devdas and Paro were childhood friends.

Devdas leaves for some years to study at a boarding school in Calcutta (now Kolkata). When, after finishing school, Devdas (Dilip Kumar) returns to the village, Paro (Suchitra Sen) looks forward to their childhood love leading to marriage. According to the prevailing social custom, Paro's parents would have to approach Devdas' parents and propose marriage.

When Paro's grandmother (Sarita Devi) makes the proposal to Devdas' mother (Pratima Devi), the latter rejects her. To demonstrate his own social status, Paro's father, Nilkant (Shivraj) then finds an even richer husband for Paro.

When Paro learns of her planned marriage, she risks her honor to meet Devdas at night, desperately believing that Devdas will quickly accept her hand in marriage. Devdas meekly seeks his parents' permission to marry Paro, but Devdas' family forbids it.

In a weak-minded state, Devdas flees to Calcutta, and from there, he writes a letter to Paro, saying that they were only friends and there was no love between them. Soon, realizing his mistake, he goes back to the village and tells Paro that he is ready to do anything needed to save their love.

By now, Paro's marriage plans are at an advanced stage, and she declines to go back to Devdas and chides him for his cowardice and vacillation. Parvati's marriage is finalized with a wealthy zamindar and widower (Moni Chatterjee) with children older than his young second wife-to-be.

In Calcutta, Devdas' carousing friend, Chunni Babu (Motilal), introduces him to a tawaif named Chandramukhi (Vyjayanthimala). Devdas takes to heavy drinking at her house, but she falls in love with him and nurses him. His health deteriorates because of a combination of excessive drinking and despair — a drawn-out form of suicide. He frequently mentally compares Paro and Chandramukhi, remaining ambivalent as to whom he really loves.

Sensing his fast-approaching death, Devdas returns to meet Paro to fulfill a vow to see her before he dies. He dies at her doorstep on a dark, cold night. On hearing of the death of Devdas, Paro runs towards the door, disregarding "purdah", but her family members prevent her from stepping outside.

== Cast ==
- Dilip Kumar as Devdas Mukherjee
- Suchitra Sen as Parvati "Paro" Chakravarti Choudhury
- Vyjayanthimala as Chandramukhi
- Motilal as Chunnilal
- Nazir Hussain as Dharamdas
- Murad as Zamindar Narayan Mukherjee
- Pratima Devi as Harimati Mukherjee
- Shivraj as Neelkanth Chakravarti
- Iftekhar as Dwijdas Mukherjee
- Kanhaiyalal as teacher
- Sarita Devi as Paro's grandmother
- Moni Chatterjee as Bhuvan Choudhury
- Nana Palsikar as Street Singer
- Dulari as Street Singer
- Parveen Paul as Devdas' sister-in-law
- Pran as Chandramukhi's Patron
- Johnny Walker as Chandramukhi's Patron
- Naaz as Young Parvati

== Production ==
Dilip Kumar was Bimal Roy's first choice for the role of Devdas. Roy wanted Meena Kumari as Paro, and Nargis as Chandramukhi, but, Meena Kumari could not take the role because her husband Kamal Amrohi laid down certain conditions which Roy did not agree with. Nargis rejected the role of Chandramukhi as she wanted to play Paro. The role of Paro was already given to Suchitra Sen. Bina Rai and Suraiya were approached to play Chandramukhi, who refused the role for the same reason as Nargis. Ultimately, Vyjayanthimala was approached and she agreed to play Chandramukhi. About Vyjayanthimala's casting, script writer Nabendu Ghosh said:

"I did not approve of Vyjayanthimala [as Chandramukhi], but we had no option – no one wanted to play Chandramukhi, and we were committed to our distributors. We were in dire straits, and Bimalda's unit was big. He never compromised in the making [of his film]. That meant expenses. And we needed money."

== Soundtrack ==
The Soundtrack of Devdas consists of 12 songs composed by S. D. Burman and the lyrics were penned by the veteran poet-lyricist Sahir Ludhianvi. Some of the songs were inspired by the Baul tradition. Apart from this, it also features some Thumris at Chandramukhi's place as to demonstrate tawaif culture.

Song	Singer
"Kisko Khabar Thi Aise Bhi Din Aayege"	Talat Mahmood
"Kisko Khabar Thi Kisko Yakeen Tha"	Talat Mahmood
"Ab Aage Teri Marzi"	Lata Mangeshkar
"O Aanewale Ruk Ja"	Lata Mangeshkar
"Jise Tu Qubool Karle"	Lata Mangeshkar
"Manzil Ki Chah Mein"	Mohammed Rafi
"Mitwa Lagi Re Yeh Kaisi"	Talat Mahmood
"Lagi Re Yeh Kaisi"	Talat Mahmood
"Aan Milo, Aan Milo Shyam Saware"	Manna Dey, Geeta Dutt
"Sajan Ki Ho Gayi Gori"	Manna Dey, Geeta Dutt
"O Albele Panchi, Tera Dur Thikana Hai"	Usha Mangeshkar, Asha Bhosle
"Wo Na Aaege Palatkar, Unhe Lakh Hum Bulaye"	Mubarak Begum

The song "Wo Na Aaenge Palatkar" is set in the Hindustani raga Khamaj.

== Awards ==
Award	Category	Nominee	Result	Note
3rd National Film Awards	Certificate of Merit for the Third Best Feature Film in Hindi	Bimal Roy	Won	Behalf of Bimal Roy Productions
4th Filmfare Awards	Best Actor	Dilip Kumar	Won	
4th Filmfare Awards	Best Supporting Actor	Motilal	Won	
4th Filmfare Awards	Best Supporting Actress	Vyjayanthimala	Won	She refused to accept the award, as she believed that her role was parallel to Suchitra Sen.
Karlovy Vary International Film Festival	India's official submission for Crystal Globe	Bimal Roy	Not nominated	

== Bibliography ==
- Rajinder Singh Bedi; Nasreen Munni Kabir (2012). The Dialogue of Devdas: Bimal Roy's Immortal Classic Based on the Bengali Novella by Sarat Chandra Chattopadhyay. Om Books International. ISBN 978-93-80069-88-3.
