= List of fiction works made into feature films (D–J) =

This is a list of works of fiction that have been made into feature films, from D to J. The title of the work and the year it was published are both followed by the work's author, the title of the film, and the year of the film. If a film has an alternate title based on geographical distribution, the title listed will be that of the widest distribution area.

== D ==
Fiction work(s)	Film adaptation(s)
The Da Vinci Code (2003), Dan Brown	The Da Vinci Code (2006)
Dad (1981), William Wharton	Dad (1989)
Damage (1991), Josephine Hart	Damage (1992)
Damnation Alley (1967), Roger Zelazny	Damnation Alley (1977)
The Damned Utd (2006), David Peace	The Damned United (2009)
The Dancer Upstairs (1995), Nicholas Shakespeare	The Dancer Upstairs (2002)
Dances with Wolves (1986), Michael Blake	Dances with Wolves (1990)
The Dancing Girl (舞姫, Maihime) (1951), Yasunari Kawabata	Dancing Girl (1951)
A Dandy in Aspic (1966), Derek Marlowe	A Dandy in Aspic (1968)
Dangerous Liaisons (French: Les Liaisons dangereuses) (1782), Pierre Choderlos de Laclos	Les Liaisons dangereuses (1959)
Dangerous Liaisons (French: Les Liaisons dangereuses) (1782), Pierre Choderlos de Laclos	Les Liaisons dangereuses (1980) (Note: Television film.)
Dangerous Liaisons (French: Les Liaisons dangereuses) (1782), Pierre Choderlos de Laclos	Dangerous Liaisons (1988)
Dangerous Liaisons (French: Les Liaisons dangereuses) (1782), Pierre Choderlos de Laclos	Valmont (1989)
Dangerous Liaisons (French: Les Liaisons dangereuses) (1782), Pierre Choderlos de Laclos	Cruel Intentions (1999)
Dangerous Liaisons (French: Les Liaisons dangereuses) (1782), Pierre Choderlos de Laclos	Untold Scandal (2003)
Dangerous Liaisons (French: Les Liaisons dangereuses) (1782), Pierre Choderlos de Laclos	Michael Lucas' Dangerous Liaisons (2005)
Dangerous Liaisons (French: Les Liaisons dangereuses) (1782), Pierre Choderlos de Laclos	Dangerous Liaisons (Chinese: 危險關係) (2012)
Dangerous Liaisons (French: Les Liaisons dangereuses) (1782), Pierre Choderlos de Laclos	Dangerous Liaisons (2022)
The Dangerous Lives of Altar Boys (2001), Chris Fuhrman	The Dangerous Lives of Altar Boys (2002)
Daniel Deronda (1876), George Eliot	Daniel Deronda (1921)
Danny, the Champion of the World (1975), Roald Dahl	Danny, the Champion of the World (1989)
Darby O'Gill and the Good People (1903), Herminie Templeton Kavanagh	Darby O'Gill and the Little People (1959)
The Dark Fields (2001), Alan Glynn	Limitless (2011)
The Dark Is Rising Sequence (1965–1977) (series), Susan Cooper	The Seeker (2007)
The Dark of the Sun (1965), Wilbur Smith	Dark of the Sun (1968)
Dark Passage (1946), David Goodis	Dark Passage (1947)
The Dark Tower (1998–2012) (series), Stephen King	The Dark Tower (2017)
David Copperfield (serialised 1849–1850, published as a book 1850), Charles Dickens	David Copperfield (1911)
David Copperfield (serialised 1849–1850, published as a book 1850), Charles Dickens	David Copperfield (1913)
David Copperfield (serialised 1849–1850, published as a book 1850), Charles Dickens	David Copperfield (1922)
David Copperfield (serialised 1849–1850, published as a book 1850), Charles Dickens	David Copperfield (1935)
David Copperfield (serialised 1849–1850, published as a book 1850), Charles Dickens	David Copperfield (1969)
David Copperfield (serialised 1849–1850, published as a book 1850), Charles Dickens	David Copperfield (1983)
David Copperfield (serialised 1849–1850, published as a book 1850), Charles Dickens	David Copperfield (1993)
David Copperfield (serialised 1849–1850, published as a book 1850), Charles Dickens	David Copperfield (1999)
David Copperfield (serialised 1849–1850, published as a book 1850), Charles Dickens	David Copperfield (2000)
David Copperfield (serialised 1849–1850, published as a book 1850), Charles Dickens	The Personal History of David Copperfield (2019)
The Day of the Dolphin (French: Un animal doué de raison) (1967), Robert Merle	The Day of the Dolphin (1973)
The Day of the Jackal (1971), Frederick Forsyth	The Day of the Jackal (1973)
The Day of the Jackal (1971), Frederick Forsyth	August 1 (1988)
The Day of the Jackal (1971), Frederick Forsyth	The Jackal (1997)
The Day of the Locust (1939), Nathanael West	The Day of the Locust (1975)
The Day of the Triffids (1951), John Wyndham	The Day of the Triffids (1962)
The Day They Robbed the Bank of England (1959), John Brophy	The Day They Robbed the Bank of England (1960)
Day with a Perfect Stranger (2006), David Gregory	Another Perfect Stranger (2007)
The Daybreakers (1960) (Note: Conflated with another work Sackett (1961) by the same author for the film adaptation.), Louis L'Amour	The Sacketts (1979)
Dead Calm (1963), Charles K. Williams	Dead Calm (1989)
The Dead End (Egyptian Arabic: الطريق المسدود, Al-Tareeq al-Masdood) (1955), Ihsan Abdel Quddous	The Barred Road (1958)
The Dead Take No Bows (1941), Richard Bruke	Dressed to Kill (1941)
The Dead Zone (1979), Stephen King	The Dead Zone (1983)
Deadline at Dawn (1944), Cornell Woolrich (Note: Written as William Irish.)	Deadline at Dawn (1946)
The Deadly Duo (1959), Richard Jessup	The Deadly Duo (1962)
Deadly, Unna? (1998), Phillip Gwynne	Australian Rules (2002)
Dealing: or the Berkeley-to-Boston Forty-Brick Lost-Bag Blues (1970), Michael Crichton and Douglas Crichton (Note: Written as Michael Douglas.)	Dealing: Or the Berkeley-to-Boston Forty-Brick Lost-Bag Blues (1972)
Dear John (2006), Nicholas Sparks	Dear John (2010)
Death in Venice (German: Der Tod in Venedig) (1912), Thomas Mann	Death in Venice (1971)
Death Notice (Chinese: 死亡通知单：暗黑者) (2014), Zhou Haohui	Death Notice (Chinese: 暗殺風暴) (2023)
Death of a Common Man (1946), Desmond Holdridge	The End of the River (1947)
The Death of Arthur (French: Le Morte d'Arthur) (1485), Sir Thomas Malory	Knights of the Round Table (1953)
The Death of Arthur (French: Le Morte d'Arthur) (1485), Sir Thomas Malory	Excalibur (1981)
Death on the Nile (1937), Agatha Christie	Death on the Nile (1978)
Death on the Nile (1937), Agatha Christie	Death on the Nile (2004)
Death on the Nile (1937), Agatha Christie	Death on the Nile (2022)
Death Sentence (1975), Brian Garfield	Death Sentence (2007)
Death Wish (1972), Brian Garfield	Death Wish (1974)
Death Wish (1972), Brian Garfield	Death Wish (2018)
The Deceivers (1952), John Masters	The Deceivers (1988)
December Boys (1963), Michael Noonan	December Boys (2007)
The Deep (1976), Peter Benchley	The Deep (1977)
The Deep End of the Ocean (1996), Jacquelyn Mitchard	The Deep End of the Ocean (1999)
Deep Water (1957), Patricia Highsmith	Eaux profondes (1981)
Deep Water (1957), Patricia Highsmith	Deep Water (2022)
Deliverance (1970), James Dickey	Deliverance (1972)
The Deluge (1886), Henryk Sienkiewicz	The Deluge (1974)
Deluge (1928), S. Fowler Wright	Deluge (1933)
Demon City Shinjuku (魔界都市〈新宿〉, Makai Toshi: Shinjuku) (1982), Hideyuki Kikuchi	Demon City Shinjuku (1988)
Demon Seed (1973), Dean Koontz	Demon Seed (1977)
Demons (Russian: Бесы, romanized: Bésy, IPA: [ˈbʲe.sɨ]) (1872), Fyodor Dostoyevsky	The Possessed (1988)
Derailed (2003), James Siegel	Derailed (2005)
Desert Fury (1946), Ramona Stewart	Desert Fury (1947)
Desert Gold (1913), Zane Grey	Desert Gold (1919)
Desert Gold (1913), Zane Grey	Desert Gold (1926)
Desert Gold (1913), Zane Grey	Desert Gold (1936)
Desert Guns (1957), Steve Frazee	Gold of the Seven Saints (1961)
Desert of the Heart (1964), Jane Rule	Desert Hearts (1985)
The Desperate Hours (1954), Joseph Hayes	The Desperate Hours (1955)
The Desperate Hours (1954), Joseph Hayes	Desperate Hours (1990)
The Desperate Hours (1954), Joseph Hayes	36 Ghante (1974)
Destry Rides Again (1930), Max Brand	Destry Rides Again (1932)
Destry Rides Again (1930), Max Brand	Destry Rides Again (1939)
Destry Rides Again (1930), Max Brand	Destry (1954)
The Detective (1966), Roderick Thorp	The Detective (1968)
Detective (1997), Arthur Hailey	Detective (2005)
Detective Bureau 23 (探偵事務所23, Tantei Jimusho 23) (1962), Haruhiko Oyabu	Detective Bureau 2-3: Go to Hell Bastards! (1963)
Detective Bureau 23 (探偵事務所23, Tantei Jimusho 23) (1962), Haruhiko Oyabu	Detective Bureau 2-3: A Man Weak to Money and Women (1963)
Detective in the Bar (探偵はバーにいる, Bar ni Kakatte Kita Denwa) (1981), Naomi Azuma	Detective in the Bar (探偵はBARにいる, Tantei wa bar ni iru) (2011)
Devdas (Bengali: দেবদাস) (1917), Sarat Chandra Chattopadhyay	Devdas (1928)
Devdas (Bengali: দেবদাস) (1917), Sarat Chandra Chattopadhyay	Devdas (1935)
Devdas (Bengali: দেবদাস) (1917), Sarat Chandra Chattopadhyay	Devdas (1936)
Devdas (Bengali: দেবদাস) (1917), Sarat Chandra Chattopadhyay	Devdas (1937)
Devdas (Bengali: দেবদাস) (1917), Sarat Chandra Chattopadhyay	Devadasu (1953)
Devdas (Bengali: দেবদাস) (1917), Sarat Chandra Chattopadhyay	Devdas (1955)
Devdas (Bengali: দেবদাস) (1917), Sarat Chandra Chattopadhyay	Devdas (1965)
Devdas (Bengali: দেবদাস) (1917), Sarat Chandra Chattopadhyay	Devadasu (1974)
Devdas (Bengali: দেবদাস) (1917), Sarat Chandra Chattopadhyay	Muqaddar Ka Sikandar (1978)
Devdas (Bengali: দেবদাস) (1917), Sarat Chandra Chattopadhyay	Devdas (1979)
Devdas (Bengali: দেবদাস) (1917), Sarat Chandra Chattopadhyay	Prema Tarangalu (1980)
Devdas (Bengali: দেবদাস) (1917), Sarat Chandra Chattopadhyay	Amara Kaaviyam (1981)
Devdas (Bengali: দেবদাস) (1917), Sarat Chandra Chattopadhyay	Devdas (1982)
Devdas (Bengali: দেবদাস) (1917), Sarat Chandra Chattopadhyay	Devadas (1989)
Devdas (Bengali: দেবদাস) (1917), Sarat Chandra Chattopadhyay	Devdas (2002, Bengali)
Devdas (Bengali: দেবদাস) (1917), Sarat Chandra Chattopadhyay	Devdas (2002, Hindi)
Devdas (Bengali: দেবদাস) (1917), Sarat Chandra Chattopadhyay	Devdas (2004)
Devdas (Bengali: দেবদাস) (1917), Sarat Chandra Chattopadhyay	Dev.D (2009)
Devdas (Bengali: দেবদাস) (1917), Sarat Chandra Chattopadhyay	Devdas (2010)
Devdas (Bengali: দেবদাস) (1917), Sarat Chandra Chattopadhyay	Devdas (2013)
Devdas (Bengali: দেবদাস) (1917), Sarat Chandra Chattopadhyay	Devi (2017)
Devdas (Bengali: দেবদাস) (1917), Sarat Chandra Chattopadhyay	Daas Dev (2018)
Devdas (Bengali: দেবদাস) (1917), Sarat Chandra Chattopadhyay	Nayakara Na Debadas (Odia: ନାୟକର ନାଁ ଦେବଦାସ) (2019)
The Devil All the Time (2011), Donald Ray Pollock	The Devil All the Time (2020)
The Devil in the Flesh (French: Le Diable au corps) (1923), Raymond Radiguet	Devil in the Flesh (1947)
The Devil in the Flesh (French: Le Diable au corps) (1923), Raymond Radiguet	Devil in the Flesh (1986)
The Devil Rides Out (1934), Dennis Wheatley	The Devil Rides Out (1967)
The Devil Wears Prada (2003), Lauren Weisberger	The Devil Wears Prada (2006)
The Devil Wears Prada (2003), Lauren Weisberger	The Devil Wears Prada 2 (2026)
The Devil's Advocate (1954), Morris West	The Devil's Advocate (German: Des Teufels Advokat) (1977)
The Devil's Advocate (1990), Andrew Neiderman	The Devil's Advocate (1997)
The Devil's Own (1966), Norah Lofts	The Witches (1966)
The Devils of Loudun (1952), Aldous Huxley	The Devils (1971)
The Devotion of Suspect X (容疑者Xの献身, Yōgisha Ekkusu no Kenshin) (2005), Keigo Higashino	Suspect X (2008)
The Devotion of Suspect X (容疑者Xの献身, Yōgisha Ekkusu no Kenshin) (2005), Keigo Higashino	Perfect Number (Korean: 용의자X; RR: Yonguija X) (2012)
The Devotion of Suspect X (容疑者Xの献身, Yōgisha Ekkusu no Kenshin) (2005), Keigo Higashino	Kolaigaran (2019)
The Devotion of Suspect X (容疑者Xの献身, Yōgisha Ekkusu no Kenshin) (2005), Keigo Higashino	Jaane Jaan (2023)
Dharamputra (Hindi: धर्मपुत्र), Acharya Chatursen	Dharmputra (1961)
Dharmasere (Kannada: ಧರ್ಮಸೆರೆ) (1934), G. B. Joshi (Note: Written as Jada Bharatha.)	Dharmasere (1979)
The Diamond Hunters (1971), Wilbur Smith	The Kingfisher Caper (1975)
Diamonds Are Forever (1956), Ian Fleming	Diamonds Are Forever (1971)
The Diary of a Country Priest (French: Journal d'un curé de campagne) (1936), Georges Bernanos	Diary of a Country Priest (1951)
Diary of a Mad Old Man (瘋癲老人日記, Fūten rōjin nikki) (1961), Jun'ichirō Tanizaki	Shishi no Gotoku (1962)
Diary of a Mad Old Man (瘋癲老人日記, Fūten rōjin nikki) (1961), Jun'ichirō Tanizaki	Diary of a Old Man (Dutch: Dagboek van een Oude Dwaas) (1987)
The Dice of God (1962), Hoffman Birney	The Glory Guys (1965)
Different Seasons (1982), (Note: Short story collection; stories adapted from this work in order: Rita Hayworth and Shawshank Redemption, Apt Pupil and The Body (all 1982).) Stephen King	Stand by Me (1986)
Different Seasons (1982), Stephen King	The Shawshank Redemption (1994)
Different Seasons (1982), Stephen King	Apt Pupil (1998)
The Dig (2007), John Preston	The Dig (2021)
Diner (ダイナー) (2009), Yumeaki Hirayama	Diner (2019)
Dinner with a Perfect Stranger: An Invitation Worth Considering (2005), David Gregory	The Perfect Stranger (2005)
Dinner with a Perfect Stranger: An Invitation Worth Considering (2005), David Gregory	Another Perfect Stranger (2007)
Dinner with a Perfect Stranger: An Invitation Worth Considering (2005), David Gregory	The Perfect Gift (2009)
Dinner with a Perfect Stranger: An Invitation Worth Considering (2005), David Gregory	Nikki and the Perfect Stranger (2013)
The Dirty Dozen (1965), E. M. Nathanson	The Dirty Dozen (1967)
Dirty Weekend (1991), Helen Zahavi	Dirty Weekend (1993)
Disappearing Acts (1989), Terry McMillan	Disappearing Acts (2000)
Disclosure (1994), Michael Crichton	Disclosure (1994)
The Disorientated Man (1967), Peter Saxon	Scream and Scream Again (1970)
Il disprezzo (1954), Alberto Moravia	Contempt (French: Le Mépris) (1963)
A Distant Trumpet (1951), Paul Horgan	A Distant Trumpet (1964)
Divine Secrets of the Ya-Ya Sisterhood (1996), Rebecca Wells	Divine Secrets of the Ya-Ya Sisterhood (2002)
Le Divorce (1997), Diane Johnson	Le Divorce (2003)
Do Androids Dream of Electric Sheep? (1967), Philip K. Dick (Note: Title adapted from an unrelated work The Bladerunner (1974) by Alan E. Nourse.)	Blade Runner (1982)
Do Androids Dream of Electric Sheep? (1967), Philip K. Dick	Blade Runner 2049 (2017)
Doctor (1952—1986) (series) (Note: Works adapted from the series in chronological order: Doctor in the House (1952), Doctor at Sea, (1953), Doctor at Large (1955), Doctor in Love (1957), Doctor in Clover (1960) and Doctor on Toast (1961).), Richard Gordon	Doctor in the House (1954)
Doctor (1952—1986) (series), Richard Gordon	Doctor at Sea (1955)
Doctor (1952—1986) (series), Richard Gordon	Doctor at Large (1957)
Doctor (1952—1986) (series), Richard Gordon	Doctor in Love (1960)
Doctor (1952—1986) (series), Richard Gordon	Doctor in Distress (1963)
Doctor (1952—1986) (series), Richard Gordon	Doctor in Clover (1966)
Doctor (1952—1986) (series), Richard Gordon	Doctor in Trouble (1970)
Doctor Slaughter (1984), Paul Theroux	Half Moon Street (1986)
Doctor Sleep (2013), Stephen King	Doctor Sleep (2019)
Doctor Zhivago (1957), Boris Pasternak	Doctor Zhivago (1965)
Dodsworth (1929), Sinclair Lewis	Dodsworth (1936)
Does Not Give a Damn (Hebrew: לא שם זין) (1973), Dan Ben-Amotz	I Don't Give a Damn (1987)
Dog Soldiers (1974), Robert Stone	Who'll Stop the Rain (1978)
The Dogs of War (1974), Frederick Forsyth	The Dogs of War (1981)
Don Quixote (Note: Full title: The Ingenious Gentleman Don Quixote of La Mancha (Spanish: El ingenioso hidalgo don Quixote de la Mancha)) (1605–1615), Miguel de Cervantes	Don Quixote (1908)
Don Quixote (1605–1615), Miguel de Cervantes	Don Quixote (French: Don Quichotte) (1908)
Don Quixote (1605–1615), Miguel de Cervantes	Don Quixote (1915)
Don Quixote (1605–1615), Miguel de Cervantes	The Dream of Don Quixote (Italian: Il sogno di don Chisciotte) (1915)
Don Quixote (1605–1615), Miguel de Cervantes	Don Quixote (1923)
Don Quixote (1605–1615), Miguel de Cervantes	Don Quixote (1926)
Don Quixote (1605–1615), Miguel de Cervantes	Don Quixote (1933)
Don Quixote (1605–1615), Miguel de Cervantes	Don Quixote (1933; French)
Don Quixote (1605–1615), Miguel de Cervantes	Don Quixote (Spanish: Don Quijote de la Mancha) (1947)
Don Quixote (1605–1615), Miguel de Cervantes	The Curious Impertinent (Spanish: El curioso impertinente) (1953)
Don Quixote (1605–1615), Miguel de Cervantes	Don Quixote (1955–1969) (Note: Unfinished film.)
Don Quixote (1605–1615), Miguel de Cervantes	Don Quixote (Russian: Дон Кихот, Don Kikhot) (1957)
Don Quixote (1605–1615), Miguel de Cervantes	A Devil Under the Pillow (Spanish: Un diablo bajo la almohada, Italian: Calda e... infedele) (1968)
Don Quixote (1605–1615), Miguel de Cervantes	Don Chisciotte and Sancio Panza (Italian: Don Chisciotte e Sancio Panza) (1968)
Don Quixote (1605–1615), Miguel de Cervantes	Man of La Mancha (1972)
Don Quixote (1605–1615), Miguel de Cervantes	Don Quijote cabalga de nuevo (1973)
Don Quixote (1605–1615), Miguel de Cervantes	Don Quixote (1973)
Don Quixote (1605–1615), Miguel de Cervantes	The Amorous Adventures of Don Quixote and Sancho Panza (1976)
Don Quixote (1605–1615), Miguel de Cervantes	Don Quixote (Italian: Don Chisciotte) (1983)
Don Quixote (1605–1615), Miguel de Cervantes	Don Quixote of La Mancha (1987)
Don Quixote (1605–1615), Miguel de Cervantes	Don Quixote Returns (Russian: Дон Кихот возвращается) (1997)
Don Quixote (1605–1615), Miguel de Cervantes	Don Quixote (2000)
Don Quixote (1605–1615), Miguel de Cervantes	Don Quixote, Knight Errant (Spanish: El caballero Don Quijote) (2002)
Don Quixote (1605–1615), Miguel de Cervantes	Honor of the Knights (Catalan: Honor de cavalleria) (2006)
Don Quixote (1605–1615), Miguel de Cervantes	Donkey Xote (2007)
Don Quixote (1605–1615), Miguel de Cervantes	Don Quichote: Gib niemals auf! (2008)
Don Quixote (1605–1615), Miguel de Cervantes	Don Quixote (2010)
Don Quixote (1605–1615), Miguel de Cervantes	Don Quixote (2015)
Don Quixote (1605–1615), Miguel de Cervantes	The Man Who Killed Don Quixote (2018)
Don Quixote (1605–1615), Miguel de Cervantes	The True Don Quixote (2019)
Donovan's Brain (1942), Curt Siodmak	The Lady and the Monster (1944)
Donovan's Brain (1942), Curt Siodmak	Donovan's Brain (1953)
Donovan's Brain (1942), Curt Siodmak	The Brain (1962)
Don't Look and It Won't Hurt (1971), Richard Peck	Gas Food Lodging (1992)
Don't Say a Word (1991), Andrew Klavan	Don't Say a Word (2001)
Don't Tell Anyone (Spanish: No se lo digas a nadie) (1994), Jaime Bayly	No se lo Digas a Nadie (Don't Tell Anyone) (1998)
The Dork of Cork (1993), Chet Raymo	Frankie Starlight (1995)
Dotonbori River (道頓堀川, Dotonborigawa) (1981), Teru Miyamoto	Dotonbori River (1982)
Double Indemnity (serialised 1936, published as a book 1943), James M. Cain	Double Indemnity (1944)
Double Indemnity (serialised 1936, published as a book 1943), James M. Cain	Double Indemnity (1973)
The Double Take (1946), Roy Huggins	I Love Trouble (1948)
Down Will Come Baby (1991), Gloria Murphy	Down Will Come Baby (1999)
Dracula (1897), Bram Stoker	Dracula's Death (Hungarian: Drakula halála) (1923)
Dracula (1897), Bram Stoker	Nosferatu (1922)
Dracula (1897), Bram Stoker	Dracula (1931; English)
Dracula (1897), Bram Stoker	Dracula (1931; Spanish)
Dracula (1897), Bram Stoker	Dracula's Daughter (1936)
Dracula (1897), Bram Stoker	Son of Dracula (1943)
Dracula (1897), Bram Stoker	House of Dracula (1945)
Dracula (1897), Bram Stoker	Dracula in Istanbul (Turkmen: Drakula İstanbul'da) (1952)
Dracula (1897), Bram Stoker	Dracula (1958)
Dracula (1897), Bram Stoker	The Return of Dracula (1958)
Dracula (1897), Bram Stoker	The Brides of Dracula (1960)
Dracula (1897), Bram Stoker	Batman Dracula (1964)
Dracula (1897), Bram Stoker	Dracula: Prince of Darkness (1966)
Dracula (1897), Bram Stoker	Billy the Kid Versus Dracula (1966)
Dracula (1897), Bram Stoker	Batman Fights Dracula (1967)
Dracula (1897), Bram Stoker	Zinda Laash (Urdu: زندہ لاش, lit. 'Living Corpse') (1967)
Dracula (1897), Bram Stoker	The Empire of Dracula (Spanish: El imperio de Drácula) (1967)
Dracula (1897), Bram Stoker	Dracula Has Risen from the Grave (1968)
Dracula (1897), Bram Stoker	Santo in Dracula's Treasure (Spanish: Santo en el tesoro de Drácula) (1969)
Dracula (1897), Bram Stoker	Dracula (The Dirty Old Man) (1969)
Dracula (1897), Bram Stoker	Dracula and the Boys (1969)
Dracula (1897), Bram Stoker	Blood of Dracula's Castle (1969)
Dracula (1897), Bram Stoker	Count Dracula (1970)
Dracula (1897), Bram Stoker	Taste the Blood of Dracula (1970)
Dracula (1897), Bram Stoker	Jonathan (1970)
Dracula (1897), Bram Stoker	Scars of Dracula (1970)
Dracula (1897), Bram Stoker	Count Dracula (Czech: Hrabe Drakula) (1971)
Dracula (1897), Bram Stoker	Guess What Happened to Count Dracula (1971)
Dracula (1897), Bram Stoker	Dracula vs. Frankenstein (1971)
Dracula (1897), Bram Stoker	Blacula (1972)
Dracula (1897), Bram Stoker	Dracula, Prisoner of Frankenstein (Spanish: Drácula contra Frankenstein) (1972)
Dracula (1897), Bram Stoker	Dracula A.D. 1972 (1972)
Dracula (1897), Bram Stoker	Daughter of Dracula (French: La Fille de Dracula) (1972)
Dracula (1897), Bram Stoker	Dracula (1972)
Dracula (1897), Bram Stoker	Count Dracula's Great Love (Spanish: El gran amor del conde Drácula) (1973)
Dracula (1897), Bram Stoker	Scream Blacula Scream (1973)
Dracula (1897), Bram Stoker	Santo and Blue Demon vs. Dracula and the Wolf Man (Spanish: Santo y Blue Demon contra Drácula y el hombre lobo) (1973)
Dracula (1897), Bram Stoker	The Dracula Saga (Spanish: La saga de los Drácula) (1973)
Dracula (1897), Bram Stoker	The Satanic Rites of Dracula (1973)
Dracula (1897), Bram Stoker	Bram Stoker's Dracula (1974)
Dracula (1897), Bram Stoker	Blood for Dracula (1974)
Dracula (1897), Bram Stoker	Son of Dracula (1974)
Dracula (1897), Bram Stoker	The Legend of the 7 Golden Vampires (1974)
Dracula (1897), Bram Stoker	Vampira (1974)
Dracula (1897), Bram Stoker	Drakula Mantu (1974)
Dracula (1897), Bram Stoker	Deafula (1975)
Dracula (1897), Bram Stoker	Dracula. Über das Interesse an Vampiren (1976)
Dracula (1897), Bram Stoker	Dracula and Son (1976)
Dracula (1897), Bram Stoker	The Young Dracula (Spanish: El jovencito Drácula) (1976)
Dracula (1897), Bram Stoker	Hard Times for Dracula (Spanish: Tiempos duros para Drácula) (1976)
Dracula (1897), Bram Stoker	Lady Dracula (1977)
Dracula (1897), Bram Stoker	Dracula's Dog (1977)
Dracula (1897), Bram Stoker	Count Dracula (1977)
Dracula (1897), Bram Stoker	Dracula Sucks (1978)
Dracula (1897), Bram Stoker	Nosferatu the Vampyre (1979)
Dracula (1897), Bram Stoker	Nocturna: Granddaughter of Dracula (1979)
Dracula (1897), Bram Stoker	Love at First Bite (1979)
Dracula (1897), Bram Stoker	Dracula (1979)
Dracula (1897), Bram Stoker	Dracula Blows His Cool (German: Graf Dracula in Oberbayern) (1979)
Dracula (1897), Bram Stoker	Hay que matar a Drácula (1979)
Dracula (1897), Bram Stoker	Dracula: Sovereign of the Damned (闇の帝王 吸血鬼ドラキュラ, Yami no Teiō: Kyūketsuki Dorakyura) (1980)
Dracula (1897), Bram Stoker	Les Charlots contre Dracula (1980)
Dracula (1897), Bram Stoker	Dracula in a Coffin (Korean: 관 속의 드라큐라; RR: Gwan sogui deurakyura) (1982)
Dracula (1897), Bram Stoker	Fracchia contro Dracula (1985)
Dracula (1897), Bram Stoker	Dracula's Widow (1988)
Dracula (1897), Bram Stoker	Vampire in Venice (Italian: Nosferatu a Venezia) (1988)
Dracula (1897), Bram Stoker	Drácula (1991)
Dracula (1897), Bram Stoker	Bram Stoker's Dracula (1992)
Dracula (1897), Bram Stoker	Dracula Rising (1993)
Dracula (1897), Bram Stoker	Dracula: Dead and Loving It (1995)
Dracula (1897), Bram Stoker	Die Hard Dracula (1998)
Dracula (1897), Bram Stoker	The Mark of Dracula (2000)
Dracula (1897), Bram Stoker	Dracula 2000 (2000)
Dracula (1897), Bram Stoker	Dark Prince: The True Story of Dracula (2000)
Dracula (1897), Bram Stoker	Dracula: Pages from a Virgin's Diary (2002)
Dracula (1897), Bram Stoker	Dracula's Fiancee (French: La Fiancée de Dracula) (2002)
Dracula (1897), Bram Stoker	Dracula Vs Frankenstein (2002)
Dracula (1897), Bram Stoker	Killer Barbys vs. Dracula (2002)
Dracula (1897), Bram Stoker	Dracula II: Ascension (2003)
Dracula (1897), Bram Stoker	Van Helsing (2004)
Dracula (1897), Bram Stoker	Lust for Dracula (2004)
Dracula (1897), Bram Stoker	Dracula 3000 (2004)
Dracula (1897), Bram Stoker	Bram Stoker's Way of the Vampire (2005)
Dracula (1897), Bram Stoker	Dracula III: Legacy (2005)
Dracula (1897), Bram Stoker	The Batman vs. Dracula (2005) (Note: Direct-to-video film.)
Dracula (1897), Bram Stoker	Bram Stoker's Dracula's Curse (2006)
Dracula (1897), Bram Stoker	Dracula (2006)
Dracula (1897), Bram Stoker	Bonnie & Clyde vs. Dracula (2008)
Dracula (1897), Bram Stoker	Dracula (2009)
Dracula (1897), Bram Stoker	Dracula: Lord of the Damned (2011)
Dracula (1897), Bram Stoker	Dracula 0.9 (2012)
Dracula (1897), Bram Stoker	Terror of Dracula (2012)
Dracula (1897), Bram Stoker	Dracula 3D (2012)
Dracula (1897), Bram Stoker	Dracula Reborn (2012)
Dracula (1897), Bram Stoker	Dear Dracula (2012)
Dracula (1897), Bram Stoker	Saint Dracula 3D (2012)
Dracula (1897), Bram Stoker	Dracula 2012 (2013)
Dracula (1897), Bram Stoker	Dracula's Orgy of the Damned (2013)
Dracula (1897), Bram Stoker	Dracula: The Dark Prince (2013)
Dracula (1897), Bram Stoker	Dracula Untold (2014)
Dracula (1897), Bram Stoker	Dracula Reborn (2015)
Dracula (1897), Bram Stoker	Tales of Dracula (2015)
Dracula (1897), Bram Stoker	Dracula Goes to Camp (2017)
Dracula (1897), Bram Stoker	Dracula in a Women's Prison (2017)
Dracula (1897), Bram Stoker	Dracula in Love (2018)
Dracula (1897), Bram Stoker	Nuptials of Dracula (Spanish: As Núpcias de Drácula) (2018)
Dracula (1897), Bram Stoker	Bram Stoker's Van Helsing (2021)
Dracula (1897), Bram Stoker	Dracula on Holiday (2021)
Dracula (1897), Bram Stoker	Dracula: The Original Living Vampire (2022)
Dracula (1897), Bram Stoker	Renfield (2023)
Dracula (1897), Bram Stoker	Wrath of Dracula (2023)
Dracula (1897), Bram Stoker	The Last Voyage of the Demeter (2023)
Dracula (1897), Bram Stoker	Nosferatu (2023)
Dracula (1897), Bram Stoker	Nosferatu (2024)
Dracula (1897), Bram Stoker	Dracula (2025; French)
Dracula (1897), Bram Stoker	Dracula (2025; Romanian)
The Dragon and the George (1976), Gordon R. Dickson	The Flight of Dragons (1982)
Dragon Seed (1942), Pearl S. Buck	Dragon Seed (1944)
Dragons of Autumn Twilight (1984), Margaret Weis and Tracy Hickman	Dragonlance: Dragons of Autumn Twilight (2008)
Dream Days (1898), Kenneth Grahame	The Reluctant Dragon (1941)
The Dream Master (1966), Roger Zelazny	Dreamscape (1984)
Dreamcatcher (2001), Stephen King	Dreamcatcher (2003)
The Drift Fence (1933), Zane Grey	Drift Fence (1936)
Dr. No (1958), Ian Fleming	Dr. No (1962)
The Drowning Pool (1950), Ross Macdonald	The Drowning Pool (1975)
Drums Along the Mohawk (1936), Walter D. Edmonds	Drums Along the Mohawk (1939)
The Drums of Jeopardy (1920), Harold MacGrath	The Drums of Jeopardy (1923)
The Drums of Jeopardy (1920), Harold MacGrath	The Drums of Jeopardy (1931)
The Dude Ranger (1931), Zane Grey	The Dude Ranger (1934)
The Dude Ranger (1931), Zane Grey	Roll Along, Cowboy (1937)
Duel in the Sun (1941), Niven Busch	Duel in the Sun (1946)
Dune (1965), Frank Herbert	Dune (1984)
Dune (1965), Frank Herbert	Dune: Part One (2021)
Dune (1965), Frank Herbert	Dune: Part Two (2024)
Dune Messiah (1969), Frank Herbert	Dune: Part Three (2026)
The Dying Animal (2001), Philip Roth	Elegy (2008)
Dying Young (1990), Marti Leimbach	Dying Young (1991)

== E ==
Fiction work(s)	Film adaptation(s)
The Eagle Has Landed (1975), Jack Higgins	The Eagle Has Landed (1976)
The Eagle of the Ninth (1954), Rosemary Sutcliff	The Eagle (2011)
The Earthquake Bird (2001), Susanna Jones	Earthquake Bird (2019)
East of Eden (1952), John Steinbeck	East of Eden (1955)
Eaters of the Dead (1976), Michael Crichton	The 13th Warrior (1999)
Eddie and the Cruisers (1980), P. F. Kluge	Eddie and the Cruisers (1983)
The Egyptian (Finnish: Sinuhe egyptiläinen, Sinuhe the Egyptian) (1945), Mika Waltari	The Egyptian (1954)
Election (1998), Tom Perrotta	Election (1999)
Elephant Walk (1948), Digby George Gerahty (as Robert Standish)	Elephant Walk (1954)
Elles n'oublient jamais (1993), Christopher Frank	Elles n'oublient jamais (1994)
Elmer Gantry (1927), Sinclair Lewis	Elmer Gantry (1960)
Elsk meg i morgen (Love Me Tomorrow) (1999), Ingvar Ambjørnsen	Elsk meg i morgen (2005)
The Elusive Pimpernel (1908), Baroness Orczy	The Elusive Pimpernel (1919)
The Elusive Pimpernel (1908), Baroness Orczy	The Elusive Pimpernel (1950)
Emma (1815), Jane Austen	Clueless (1995)
Emma (1815), Jane Austen	Emma (1996)
Emma (1815), Jane Austen	Emma (1996)
Emma (1815), Jane Austen	Aisha (2010)
Emma (1815), Jane Austen	Emma. (2020)
Emil and the Detectives (German: Emil und die Detektive) (1929), Erich Kästner	Emil and the Detectives (1931)
Emil and the Detectives (German: Emil und die Detektive) (1929), Erich Kästner	Emil and the Detectives (1935)
Emil and the Detectives (German: Emil und die Detektive) (1929), Erich Kästner	Emil and the Detectives (1954)
Emil and the Detectives (German: Emil und die Detektive) (1929), Erich Kästner	Emil and the Detectives (1964)
Emil and the Detectives (German: Emil und die Detektive) (1929), Erich Kästner	Emil and the Detectives (2001)
Emotional Arithmetic (1990), Matt Cohen	Emotional Arithmetic (2008)
Empire of the Sun (1984), J. G. Ballard	Empire of the Sun (1987)
The Enchanted April (1922), Elizabeth von Arnim	Enchanted April (1935)
The Enchanted April (1922), Elizabeth von Arnim	Enchanted April (1992)
The Enchanted Voyage (1936), Robert Nathan	Wake Up and Dream (1946)
The End of the Affair (1951), Graham Greene	The End of the Affair (1955)
The End of the Affair (1951), Graham Greene	The End of the Affair (1999)
Endless Love (1979), Scott Spencer	Endless Love (1981)
Endless Love (1979), Scott Spencer	Endless Love (2014)
Enduring Love (1997), Ian McEwan	Enduring Love (2004)
The Enemies of Women (Spanish: Los Enemigos de la Mujer) (1922), Vicente Blasco Ibáñez	Enemies of Women (1923)
The Enemy Below (1956), D. A. Rayner	The Enemy Below (1957)
The English Patient (1992), Michael Ondaatje	The English Patient (1996)
Enigma (1995), Robert Harris	Enigma (2001)
The Entity (1978), Frank De Felitta	The Entity (1982)
Eragon (2003), Christopher Paolini	Eragon (2006)
Escape (1939), Grace Zaring Stone	Escape (1940)
Escape to Witch Mountain (1968), Alexander Key	Escape to Witch Mountain (1975)
Escape to Witch Mountain (1968), Alexander Key	Return from Witch Mountain (1978)
Escape to Witch Mountain (1968), Alexander Key	Beyond Witch Mountain (1982)
Escape to Witch Mountain (1968), Alexander Key	Escape to Witch Mountain (1995)
Escape to Witch Mountain (1968), Alexander Key	Race to Witch Mountain (2009)
The Evening Star (1992), Larry McMurtry	The Evening Star (1996)
Everybody's All-American (1981), Frank Deford	Everybody's All-American (1988)
Everything Is Illuminated (2002), Jonathan Safran Foer	Everything Is Illuminated (2005)
Evil Angels (French: Lunes de fiel) (1981), Pascal Bruckner	Bitter Moon (1992)
Evil Come, Evil Go (1961), Whit Masterson	The Yellow Canary (1963)
Evil Under the Sun (1981), Agatha Christie	Evil Under the Sun (1982)
Except for Me and Thee (1955) (Note: Conflated with another work The Friendly Persuasion (1945) by the same author for the film adaptation.), Jessamyn West	Friendly Persuasion (1975)
The Executioners (1957), John D. MacDonald	Cape Fear (1962)
The Executioners (1957), John D. MacDonald	Cape Fear (1991)
Executive Suite (1952), Cameron Hawley	Executive Suite (1954)
Exit to Eden (1984), Anne Rice (as Anne Rampling)	Exit To Eden (1994)
Exit Wounds (1990), John Westermann	Exit Wounds (2001)
Exodus (1958), Leon Uris	Exodus (1960)
The Exorcist (1971), William Peter Blatty	The Exorcist (1973)
The Exorcist (1971), William Peter Blatty	Exorcist II: The Heretic (1977)
The Exorcist (1971), William Peter Blatty	The Exorcist III (1990) (Note: Film adapted from the sequel novel Legion (1983) by the same author.)
The Exorcist (1971), William Peter Blatty	Exorcist: The Beginning (2004)
The Exorcist (1971), William Peter Blatty	Dominion: Prequel to the Exorcist (2005)
The Exorcist (1971), William Peter Blatty	The Exorcist: Believer (2023)
Experiment Perilous (1943), Margaret Carpenter	Experiment Perilous (1944)
Extremely Loud and Incredibly Close (2005), Jonathan Safran Foer	Extremely Loud and Incredibly Close (2012)
The Eye of the Beholder (1980), Marc Behm	Deadly Circuit (French: Mortelle Randonnée) (1983)
The Eye of the Beholder (1980), Marc Behm	Eye of the Beholder (1999)
Eye of the Needle (1978) (Note: First published as Storm Island.), Ken Follett	Eye of the Needle (1981)
Eye of the Needle (1978), Ken Follett	Fanaa (2006)
Eyes Without a Face (French: Les yeux sans visage) (1959), Jean Redon	Eyes Without a Face (1960)

== F ==
Fiction work(s)	Film adaptation(s)
Fahrenheit 451 (1953), Ray Bradbury	Fahrenheit 451 (1966)
Fahrenheit 451 (1953), Ray Bradbury	Fahrenheit 451 (2018)
Fail-Safe (1962), Eugene Burdick and Harvey Wheeler	Fail Safe (1964)
Fail-Safe (1962), Eugene Burdick and Harvey Wheeler	Fail Safe (2000)
The Fair Bride (1953), Bruce Marshall	The Angel Wore Red (1960)
The Fake Fusé: Satomi Hakkenden (伏 贋作・里見八犬伝, Fusé Gansaku: Satomi Hakkenden) (2010), Kazuki Sakuraba	Fusé: Memoirs of the Hunter Girl (伏 鉄砲娘の捕物帳, Fusé: Teppō Musume no Torimonochō) (2012)
The Fall of a Nation (1916), Thomas Dixon, Jr.	The Fall of a Nation (1916)
Falling Angel (1978), William Hjortsberg	Angel Heart (1987)
False Witness (1981), Dorothy Uhnak	False Witness (1989)
Family Business (1985), Vincent Patrick	Family Business (1989)
The Fan (1977), Bob Randall	The Fan (1981)
The Fan (1995), Peter Abrahams	The Fan (1996)
Far from the Madding Crowd (1874), Thomas Hardy	Far from the Madding Crowd (1915)
Far from the Madding Crowd (1874), Thomas Hardy	Far from the Madding Crowd (1967)
Far from the Madding Crowd (1874), Thomas Hardy	Far from the Madding Crowd (1998)
Far from the Madding Crowd (1874), Thomas Hardy	Far from the Madding Crowd (2015)
Farewell My Concubine (1991), Lilian Lee	Farewell My Concubine (1993)
A Farewell to Arms (1929), Ernest Hemingway	A Farewell to Arms (1932)
A Farewell to Arms (1929), Ernest Hemingway	A Farewell to Arms (1957)
Farewell to the King (French: L'Adieu au roi) (1969), Pierre Schoendoerffer	Farewell to the King (1989)
Farewells (Polish: Pożegnania) (1948), Stanisław Dygat	Farewells (1958)
Fate Is the Hunter (1961), Ernest K. Gann	Face Is the Hunter (1964)
Fatelessness (Hungarian: Sorstalanság) (1975), Imre Kertész	Fateless (2005)
Father Malachy's Miracle (1931), Bruce Marshall	The Miracle of Father Malachia (German: Das Wunder des Malachias) (1961)
Father of Frankenstein (1995), Christopher Bram	Gods and Monsters (1998)
Father of the Bride (1949), Edward Streeter	Father of the Bride (1950)
Father of the Bride (1949), Edward Streeter	Father's Little Dividend (1951)
Father of the Bride (1949), Edward Streeter	Father of the Bride (1991)
Father of the Bride (1949), Edward Streeter	Father of the Bride Part II (1995)
Father of the Bride (1949), Edward Streeter	Father of the Bride (2022)
Father Sky (1979), Devery Freeman	Taps (1981)
Fear and Loathing in Las Vegas (1971), Hunter S. Thompson	Fear and Loathing in Las Vegas (1998)
Fear and Trembling (French: Stupeur et tremblements) (1999), Amélie Nothomb	Fear and Trembling (2003)
The Feather Men (1991), Sir Ranulph Fiennes	Killer Elite (2011)
Felidae (1989), Akif Pirinçci	Felidae (1994)
Femmes de personnes (1983), Christopher Frank	Femmes de personne (1984)
Fever Pitch (1992), Nick Hornby	Fever Pitch (1997)
Fever Pitch (1992), Nick Hornby	Fever Pitch (2005)
Fiddler's Green (1950), Ernest K. Gann	The Raging Tide (1951)
Fifty Shades (2011—2012) (series) (Note: Works adapted from the series in chronological order: Fifty Shades of Grey (2011), Fifty Shades Darker (2012) and Fifty Shades Freed (2012).), E. L. James	Fifty Shades of Grey (2015)
Fifty Shades (2011—2012) (series), E. L. James	Fifty Shades Darker (2017)
Fifty Shades (2011—2012) (series), E. L. James	Fifty Shades Freed (2018)
Fight Club (1996), Chuck Palahniuk	Fight Club (1999)
Fighting Caravans (1929), Zane Grey	Fighting Caravans (1931)
Fighting Caravans (1929), Zane Grey	Wagon Wheels (1934)
The Final Programme (1968), Michael Moorcock	The Final Programme (1973)
Fire on the Mountain (1962), Edward Abbey	Fire on the Mountain (1981)
Firefox (1977), Craig Thomas	Firefox (1982)
Fires on the Plain (野火, Nobi) (1959), Shōhei Ōoka	Fires on the Plain (1959)
Fires on the Plain (野火, Nobi) (1959), Shōhei Ōoka	Fires on the Plain (2014)
Firestarter (1980), Stephen King	Firestarter (1984)
Firestarter (1980), Stephen King	Firestarter: Rekindled (2002)
Firestarter (1980), Stephen King	Firestarter (2022)
The Firm (1991), John Grisham	The Firm (1993)
First Blood (1972), David Morrell	First Blood (1982)
First Blood (1972), David Morrell	Rambo: First Blood Part II (1985)
First Blood (1972), David Morrell	Rambo III (1988)
First Blood (1972), David Morrell	Rambo (2008)
First Blood (1972), David Morrell	Rambo: Last Blood (2019)
First Love, Last Rites (1975), Ian McEwan	Schmetterlinge (1988)
First Love, Last Rites (1975), Ian McEwan	First Love, Last Rites (1997)
The First Men in the Moon (1901), H. G. Wells	The First Men in the Moon (1919)
The First Men in the Moon (1901), H. G. Wells	First Men in the Moon (1964)
The First Men in the Moon (1901), H. G. Wells	The First Men in the Moon (2010)
The First Wives Club (1992), Olivia Goldsmith	The First Wives Club (1996)
The Five Fragments (1932), George Bell Dyer	Fog Over Frisco (1934)
The Five Fragments (1932), George Bell Dyer	Spy Ship (1942)
The Five People You Meet in Heaven (2003), Mitch Albom	The Five People You Meet in Heaven (2004)
Five Weeks in a Balloon (French: Cinq semaines en ballon) (1863), Jules Verne	Flight of the Lost Balloon (1961)
Five Weeks in a Balloon (French: Cinq semaines en ballon) (1863), Jules Verne	Five Weeks in a Balloon (1962)
Five Weeks in a Balloon (French: Cinq semaines en ballon) (1863), Jules Verne	Viaje Fantástico en Globo (1975)
Five Weeks in a Balloon (French: Cinq semaines en ballon) (1863), Jules Verne	Five Weeks in a Balloon (1977)
The Fixer (1966), Bernard Malamud	The Fixer (1968)
Flaming Youth (1921), Samuel Hopkins Adams	Flaming Youth (1923)
Flashpoint (1976), George LaFountaine	Flashpoint (1984)
Fletch (1974), Gregory Mcdonald	Fletch (1985)
Fletch (1974), Gregory Mcdonald	Fletch Lives (1989)
Fletch (1974), Gregory Mcdonald	Confess, Fletch (2022) (Note: Film adapted from the sequel novel Confess, Fletch (1976) by the same author.)
Flight of the Intruder (1986), Stephen Coonts	Flight of the Intruder (1991)
The Flight of the Phoenix (1964), Elleston Trevor	The Flight of the Phoenix (1965)
The Flight of the Phoenix (1964), Elleston Trevor	Flight of the Phoenix (2004)
Flowers in the Attic (1979), V. C. Andrews	Flowers in the Attic (1987)
Flowers in the Attic (1979), V. C. Andrews	Flowers in the Attic (2014)
Flowing Gold (1922), Rex Beach	Flowing Gold (1940)
Focus (1945), Arthur Miller	Focus (2002)
The Food of the Gods and How It Came to Earth (1904), H. G. Wells	Village of the Giants (1965)
The Food of the Gods and How It Came to Earth (1904), H. G. Wells	The Food of the Gods (1976)
The Food of the Gods and How It Came to Earth (1904), H. G. Wells	Food of the Gods II (1989)
The Fool of the Family (1930), Margaret Kennedy	Escape Me Never (1935)
The Fool of the Family (1930), Margaret Kennedy	Escape Me Never (1947)
Fools' Gold (1958), Dolores Hitchens	Bande à part (Band of Outsiders) (1964)
For Love of the Game (1991), Michael Shaara	For Love of the Game (1999)
For Whom the Bell Tolls (1940), Ernest Hemingway	For Whom the Bell Tolls (1943)
For Your Eyes Only (1960), Ian Fleming	For Your Eyes Only (1981)
For Your Eyes Only (1960), Ian Fleming	A View to a Kill (1985)
For Your Eyes Only (1960), Ian Fleming	Quantum of Solace (2008)
The Forbidden Territory (1933), Dennis Wheatley	Forbidden Territory (1934)
Force 10 From Navarone (1968), Alistair MacLean	Force 10 from Navarone (1978)
The Forest (Portuguese: A Selva) (1900), José Maria Ferreira de Castro (as Ferreira de Castro)	The Forest (2002)
Forever Amber (1944), Kathleen Winsor	Forever Amber (1947)
Forlorn River (1927), Zane Grey	Forlorn River (1937)
The Formula (1979), Steve Shagan	The Formula (1980)
Forrest Gump (1986), Winston Groom	Forrest Gump (1994)
The Fountainhead (1943), Ayn Rand	The Fountainhead (1949)
The Four Feathers (1902), A. E. W. Mason	Four Feathers (1915)
The Four Feathers (1902), A. E. W. Mason	The Four Feathers (1921)
The Four Feathers (1902), A. E. W. Mason	The Four Feathers (1929)
The Four Feathers (1902), A. E. W. Mason	The Four Feathers (1939)
The Four Feathers (1902), A. E. W. Mason	Storm Over the Nile (1955)
The Four Feathers (1902), A. E. W. Mason	The Four Feathers (1978)
The Four Feathers (1902), A. E. W. Mason	The Four Feathers (2002)
The Fourth Man (Dutch: De vierde man) (1981), Gerard Reve	The Fourth Man (1983)
The Fourth Protocol (1984), Frederick Forsyth	The Fourth Protocol (1987)
The Fox and the Hound (1967), Daniel P. Mannix	The Fox and the Hound (1981)
The Fox and the Hound (1967), Daniel P. Mannix	The Fox and the Hound 2 (2006)
F.P.1 Doesn't Answer (Note: Alternative titles: F.P.1; F.P.1 Doesn't Respond.) (1933), Curt Siodmak	F.P.1 (German: F.P.1 antwortet nicht) (1932)
F.P.1 Doesn't Answer (1933), Curt Siodmak	F.P.1 Doesn't Answer (1933)
F.P.1 Doesn't Answer (1933), Curt Siodmak	IF1 ne répond plus (1933)
Frank Merriwell (1896-1940s) (series), Gilbert Patten	The Adventures of Frank Merriwell (1936) (Note: Serial film.)
Frankenstein (1818), Mary Shelley	Life Without Soul (1915)
Frankenstein (1818), Mary Shelley	Frankenstein (1931)
Frankenstein (1818), Mary Shelley	Bride of Frankenstein (1935)
Frankenstein (1818), Mary Shelley	Son of Frankenstein (1939)
Frankenstein (1818), Mary Shelley	The Ghost of Frankenstein (1942)
Frankenstein (1818), Mary Shelley	Frankenstein Meets the Wolf Man (1943)
Frankenstein (1818), Mary Shelley	House of Frankenstein (1944)
Frankenstein (1818), Mary Shelley	House of Dracula (1945)
Frankenstein (1818), Mary Shelley	Abbott and Costello Meet Frankenstein (1948)
Frankenstein (1818), Mary Shelley	The Curse of Frankenstein (1957)
Frankenstein (1818), Mary Shelley	I Was a Teenage Frankenstein (1957)
Frankenstein (1818), Mary Shelley	The Revenge of Frankenstein (1958)
Frankenstein (1818), Mary Shelley	Frankenstein 1970 (1958)
Frankenstein (1818), Mary Shelley	Frankenstein's Daughter (1958)
Frankenstein (1818), Mary Shelley	The Hell of Frankenstein (Spanish: Orlak, el infierno de Frankenstein) (1960)
Frankenstein (1818), Mary Shelley	The Evil of Frankenstein (1964)
Frankenstein (1818), Mary Shelley	Frankenstein vs. Baragon (1965)
Frankenstein (1818), Mary Shelley	Jesse James Meets Frankenstein's Daughter (1966)
Frankenstein (1818), Mary Shelley	The War of the Gargantuas (1966)
Frankenstein (1818), Mary Shelley	Frankenstein Created Woman (1967)
Frankenstein (1818), Mary Shelley	Frankenstein Must Be Destroyed (1969)
Frankenstein (1818), Mary Shelley	Dr. Frankenstein on Campus (1970)
Frankenstein (1818), Mary Shelley	The Horror of Frankenstein (1970)
Frankenstein (1818), Mary Shelley	Dracula vs. Frankenstein (1971)
Frankenstein (1818), Mary Shelley	Lady Frankenstein (1971)
Frankenstein (1818), Mary Shelley	Cake of Blood (Spanish: Pastel de sangre) (1971)
Frankenstein (1818), Mary Shelley	Drácula contra Frankenstein (1972)
Frankenstein (1818), Mary Shelley	Santo vs. Frankenstein's Daughter (Spanish: Santo vs. la hija de Frankenstein) (1972)
Frankenstein (1818), Mary Shelley	Frankenstein '80 (1972)
Frankenstein (1818), Mary Shelley	Frankenstein (1973)
Frankenstein (1818), Mary Shelley	The Erotic Rites of Frankenstein (Spanish: La maldición de Frankenstein) (1973)
Frankenstein (1818), Mary Shelley	Blackenstein (1973)
Frankenstein (1818), Mary Shelley	Frankenstein: The True Story (1973)
Frankenstein (1818), Mary Shelley	Flesh for Frankenstein (1973)
Frankenstein (1818), Mary Shelley	Frankenstein and the Monster from Hell (1974)
Frankenstein (1818), Mary Shelley	Frankenstein: A Love Story (French: Frankenstein: Une histoire d'amour) (1974)
Frankenstein (1818), Mary Shelley	Santo and Blue Demon vs. Dr. Frankenstein (Spanish: Santo y Blue Demon contra el doctor Frankenstein) (1974)
Frankenstein (1818), Mary Shelley	Young Frankenstein (1974)
Frankenstein (1818), Mary Shelley	My Friend Frankenstein (Turkish: Sevimli Frankenştayn) (1975)
Frankenstein (1818), Mary Shelley	Frankenstein: Italian Style (Italian: Frankenstein all'italiana) (1975)
Frankenstein (1818), Mary Shelley	Terror of Frankenstein (1977)
Frankenstein (1818), Mary Shelley	Son of Frankenstein (1979)
Frankenstein (1818), Mary Shelley	Doctor Franken (1980)
Frankenstein (1818), Mary Shelley	Frankenstein (恐怖伝説 怪奇！フランケンシュタイン, Kyōfu Densetsu: Kaiki! Furankenshutain) (1981)
Frankenstein (1818), Mary Shelley	Frankenstein Island (1981)
Frankenstein (1818), Mary Shelley	Frankenstein's Mother-in-Law (German: Frankensteins Schwiegermutter) (1983)
Frankenstein (1818), Mary Shelley	Frankenstein (1984)
Frankenstein (1818), Mary Shelley	Frankenstein 90 (1984)
Frankenstein (1818), Mary Shelley	Frankenstein's Great Aunt Tillie (1984)
Frankenstein (1818), Mary Shelley	The Bride (1985)
Frankenstein (1818), Mary Shelley	Frankenstein (1986)
Frankenstein (1818), Mary Shelley	Frankenstein General Hospital (1988)
Frankenstein (1818), Mary Shelley	Frankenhooker (1990)
Frankenstein (1818), Mary Shelley	Frankenstein Unbound (1990)
Frankenstein (1818), Mary Shelley	Frank Enstein (1991)
Frankenstein (1818), Mary Shelley	Frankenstein: The College Years (1991)
Frankenstein (1818), Mary Shelley	Frankenstein (1992)
Frankenstein (1818), Mary Shelley	Leena Meets Frankenstein (1993)
Frankenstein (1818), Mary Shelley	Mary Shelley's Frankenstein (1994)
Frankenstein (1818), Mary Shelley	Frankenstein and Me (1996)
Frankenstein (1818), Mary Shelley	Billy Frankenstein (1998)
Frankenstein (1818), Mary Shelley	Lust for Frankenstein (1998)
Frankenstein (1818), Mary Shelley	Frankenstein Reborn! (1998)
Frankenstein (1818), Mary Shelley	Rock 'N Roll Frankenstein (1999)
Frankenstein (1818), Mary Shelley	Alvin and the Chipmunks Meet Frankenstein (1999)
Frankenstein (1818), Mary Shelley	Van Helsing (2004)
Frankenstein (1818), Mary Shelley	Frankenstein (2004)
Frankenstein (1818), Mary Shelley	Frankenstein vs. the Creature from Blood Cove (2005)
Frankenstein (1818), Mary Shelley	Frankenstein (2007)
Frankenstein (1818), Mary Shelley	Bikini Frankenstein (2011)
Frankenstein (1818), Mary Shelley	Frankenstein: Day of the Beast (2011)
Frankenstein (1818), Mary Shelley	Frankenweenie (2012)
Frankenstein (1818), Mary Shelley	The Frankenstein Theory (2013)
Frankenstein (1818), Mary Shelley	I, Frankenstein (2014)
Frankenstein (1818), Mary Shelley	Army of Frankensteins (2014)
Frankenstein (1818), Mary Shelley	Frankenstein vs. The Mummy (2015)
Frankenstein (1818), Mary Shelley	FRANKƐN5TƐ1N (2015)
Frankenstein (1818), Mary Shelley	Victor Frankenstein (2015)
Frankenstein (1818), Mary Shelley	Frankenstein (2025)
Frankenstein (1818), Mary Shelley	The Bride! (2026)
Freaky Friday (1972), Mary Rodgers	Freaky Friday (1976)
Freaky Friday (1972), Mary Rodgers	Freaky Friday (1995)
Freaky Friday (1972), Mary Rodgers	Freaky Friday (2003)
Freaky Friday (1972), Mary Rodgers	Freaky Friday (2018)
Freaky Friday (1972), Mary Rodgers	Freakier Friday (2025) (Note: Sequel to the 2003 film.)
Freedomland (1998), Richard Price	Freedomland (2006)
The French Lieutenant's Woman (1969), John Fowles	The French Lieutenant's Woman (1981)
Fried Green Tomatoes at the Whistle Stop Cafe (1987), Fannie Flagg	Fried Green Tomatoes (1991)
Friend (1985), Diana Henstell	Deadly Friend (1986)
The Friendly Persuasion (1945) (Note: Conflated with another work Except for Me and Thee (1955) by the same author for the 1975 film adaptation.), Jessamyn West	Friendly Persuasion (1956)
The Friendly Persuasion (1945), Jessamyn West	Friendly Persuasion (1975)
From Here to Eternity (1951), James Jones	From Here to Eternity (1953)
From Russia, with Love (1957), Ian Fleming	From Russia with Love (1963)
From the Earth to the Moon (French: De la Terre à la Lune, trajet direct en 97 heures 20 minutes) (1865), Jules Verne	From the Earth to the Moon (1958)
From the Earth to the Moon (French: De la Terre à la Lune, trajet direct en 97 heures 20 minutes) (1865), Jules Verne	The Fabulous Baron Munchausen (1961)
From the Earth to the Moon (French: De la Terre à la Lune, trajet direct en 97 heures 20 minutes) (1865), Jules Verne	Jules Verne's Rocket to the Moon (1967)
From the Earth to the Moon (French: De la Terre à la Lune, trajet direct en 97 heures 20 minutes) (1865), Jules Verne	From the Earth to the Moon (1976)
From the Terrace (1958), John O'Hara	From the Terrace (1960)
Funeral in Berlin (1964), Len Deighton	Funeral in Berlin (1966)
Funny Farm (1985), Jay Cronley	Funny Farm (1988)
The Furies (1948), Niven Busch	The Furies (1950)
The Fury (1976), John Farris	The Fury (1978)
The Fuzzy Pink Nightgown (1956), Sylvia Tate	The Fuzzy Pink Nightgown (1957)

== G ==
Fiction work(s)	Film adaptation(s)
The Game of X (1965), Robert Sheckley	Condorman (1981)
The Garden of Allah (1904), Robert Smythe Hichens	The Garden of Allah (1916)
The Garden of Allah (1904), Robert Smythe Hichens	The Garden of Allah (1927)
The Garden of Allah (1904), Robert Smythe Hichens	The Garden of Allah (1936)
The Garden of God (1923), Henry De Vere Stacpoole	Return to the Blue Lagoon (1991)
The Garden of Sinners (Japanese: 空の境界, romanized: Kara no Kyōkai) (1998–1999) (series), Kinoko Nasu	The Garden of Sinners: Overlooking View (2007)
The Garden of Sinners (Japanese: 空の境界, romanized: Kara no Kyōkai) (1998–1999) (series), Kinoko Nasu	The Garden of Sinners: A Study in Murder – Part 1 (2007)
The Garden of Sinners (Japanese: 空の境界, romanized: Kara no Kyōkai) (1998–1999) (series), Kinoko Nasu	The Garden of Sinners: Remaining Sense of Pain (2008)
The Garden of Sinners (Japanese: 空の境界, romanized: Kara no Kyōkai) (1998–1999) (series), Kinoko Nasu	The Garden of Sinners: The Hollow Shrine (2008)
The Garden of Sinners (Japanese: 空の境界, romanized: Kara no Kyōkai) (1998–1999) (series), Kinoko Nasu	The Garden of Sinners: Paradox Spiral (2008)
The Garden of Sinners (Japanese: 空の境界, romanized: Kara no Kyōkai) (1998–1999) (series), Kinoko Nasu	The Garden of Sinners: Oblivion Recording (2008)
The Garden of Sinners (Japanese: 空の境界, romanized: Kara no Kyōkai) (1998–1999) (series), Kinoko Nasu	The Garden of Sinners: A Study in Murder – Part 2 (2009)
The Garden of Sinners (Japanese: 空の境界, romanized: Kara no Kyōkai) (1998–1999) (series), Kinoko Nasu	The Garden of Sinners: Future Gospel (2013)
Gardens of Stone (1983), Nicholas Proffitt	Gardens of Stone (1987)
Gasoline (Italian: Benzina) (1998), Elena Stancanelli	Gasoline (2001)
Gate of Flesh (Japanese: 肉体の門, romanized: Nikutai no mo) (1947), Taijiro Tamura	Gate of Flesh (1948)
Gate of Flesh (Japanese: 肉体の門, romanized: Nikutai no mo) (1947), Taijiro Tamura	Gate of Flesh (1964)
Gate of Flesh (Japanese: 肉体の門, romanized: Nikutai no mo) (1947), Taijiro Tamura	The Call of Flesh (Japanese: 女体, romanized: Jotai) (1964)
Gate of Flesh (Japanese: 肉体の門, romanized: Nikutai no mo) (1947), Taijiro Tamura	Gate of Flesh (1977)
Gate of Flesh (Japanese: 肉体の門, romanized: Nikutai no mo) (1947), Taijiro Tamura	Gate of Flesh (1988)
The Gay Sisters (1942), Stephen Longstreet	The Gay Sisters (1942)
Gentle Annie (1942), MacKinlay Kantor	Gentle Annie (1944)
Gentlemen Prefer Blondes (1925), Anita Loos	Gentlemen Prefer Blondes (1928) (Note: Presumed lost film.)
Gentlemen Prefer Blondes (1925), Anita Loos	Gentlemen Prefer Blondes (1953)
Geordie (1950), David Walker	Geordie (1955)
Georgy Girl (1965), Margaret Forster	Georgy Girl (1966)
Get Shorty (1990), Elmore Leonard	Get Shorty (1995)
The Getaway (1959), Jim Thompson	The Getaway (1972)
The Getaway (1959), Jim Thompson	The Getaway (1994)
The Ghost (Spanish: El Fantasma) (1924), Wenceslao Fernández Flórez	Apology of Destiny (Spanish: El destino se disculpa) (1945)
The Ghost (2007), Robert Harris	The Ghost Writer (2010)
The Ghost and Mrs. Muir (1945), Josephine Leslie (Note: Written as R. A. Dick.)	The Ghost and Mrs. Muir (1947)
Giant (1952), Edna Ferber	Giant (1956)
Gidget, the Little Girl with Big Ideas (1957), Frederick Kohner	Gidget (1959)
The Girl from Petrovka (1971), George Feifer	The Girl from Petrovka (1974)
The Girl in the Spider's Web (Swedish: Det som inte dödar oss) (2015), David Lagercrantz (Note: Continuation of the Millennium series authored by Stieg Larsson.)	The Girl in the Spider's Web (2018)
The Girl Who Leapt Through Time (Japanese: 時をかける少女, romanized: Toki o Kakeru Shōjo) (1967), (Note: Serialised 1966–1967; published as a book 1967.) Yasutaka Tsutsui	The Girl Who Leapt Through Time (1983)
The Girl Who Leapt Through Time (Japanese: 時をかける少女, romanized: Toki o Kakeru Shōjo) (1967), Yasutaka Tsutsui	The Girl Who Leapt Through Time (1997)
The Girl Who Leapt Through Time (Japanese: 時をかける少女, romanized: Toki o Kakeru Shōjo) (1967), Yasutaka Tsutsui	Morning Musume: Shinshun! Love Stories (Japanese: 新春! LOVEストーリーズ) (2002)
The Girl Who Leapt Through Time (Japanese: 時をかける少女, romanized: Toki o Kakeru Shōjo) (1967), Yasutaka Tsutsui	The Girl Who Leapt Through Time (2006)
The Girl Who Leapt Through Time (Japanese: 時をかける少女, romanized: Toki o Kakeru Shōjo) (1967), Yasutaka Tsutsui	Time Traveller: The Girl Who Leapt Through Time (2010)
Girl with a Pearl Earring (1999), Tracy Chevalier	Girl with a Pearl Earring (2003)
The Girls' Guide to Hunting and Fishing (2000), Melissa Bank	Suburban Girl (2008)
The Glass Inferno (1974) (Note: Conflated with another work The Tower (1973) by Richard Martin Stern for the film adaptation.), Thomas N. Scortia and Frank M. Robinson	The Towering Inferno (1974)
The Glass Rabbit (Japanese: ガラスのうさぎ, romanized: Garasu no Usagi) (1977), Toshiko Takagi	Tokyo Air Raid: The Glass Rabbit (東京大空襲 ガラスのうさぎ, Tōkyō Dai-kūshū: Garasu no Usagi) (1979)
The Glass Rabbit (Japanese: ガラスのうさぎ, romanized: Garasu no Usagi) (1977), Toshiko Takagi	Glass no Usagi (2005)
Glitz (1985), Elmore Leonard	Glitz (1988)
Glory for Me (1945), MacKinlay Kantor	The Best Years of Our Lives (1946)
Gnomes (Dutch: Leven en werken van de Kabouter) (1977), Wil Huygen and Rien Poortvliet	Gnomes (1980)
The Gnomobile (1937), Upton Sinclair	The Gnome-Mobile (1967)
The Goalkeeper's Fear of the Penalty (German: Die Angst des Tormanns beim Elfmeter) (1970), Peter Handke	The Goalkeeper's Fear of the Penalty (1972)
The Go-Between (1953), L. P. Hartley	The Go-Between (1971)
The Go-Between (1953), L. P. Hartley	The Go-Between (2015)
God and My Country (1954), MacKinlay Kantor	Follow Me, Boys! (1966)
God's Little Acre (1933), Erskine Caldwell	God's Little Acre (1958)
God's Mischief (Malayalam: ദൈവത്തിന്റെ വികൃതികള്‍) (1989), M. Mukundan	Daivathinte Vikrithikal (1992)
God's Puzzle (Japanese: 神様のパズル, romanized: Kamisama no pazuru) (2002), Shinji Kimoto	God's Puzzle (2008)
The Godfather (1969), Mario Puzo	The Godfather (1972)
The Godfather (1969), Mario Puzo	The Godfather Part II (1974)
The Godfather (1969), Mario Puzo	The Godfather Part III (1990)
Gods and Generals (1996), Jeffrey Shaara	Gods and Generals (2003)
The Gods Hate Kansas (1941), Joseph Millard	They Came from Beyond Space (1967)
Gold Coast (1980), Elmore Leonard	Gold Coast (1997)
Gold Mine (1970), Wilbur Smith	Gold (1974)
The Golden Bowl (1904), Henry James	The Golden Bowl (2000)
The Golden Dog (Japanese: 黄金の犬, romanized: Kogane no Inu) (1977–78), Jukô Nishimura	Dog of Fortune (1979)
The Golden Evenings of Summer (1971), Will Stanton	Charley and the Angel (1973)
The Golden Key, or the Adventures of Buratino (Russian: Золотой ключик, или Приключения Буратино) (1936), Aleksey Nikolayevich Tolstoy	The Golden Key (Russian: Золотой ключик) (1939)
The Golden Key, or the Adventures of Buratino (Russian: Золотой ключик, или Приключения Буратино) (1936), Aleksey Nikolayevich Tolstoy	The Adventures of Buratino (1959)
The Golden Key, or the Adventures of Buratino (Russian: Золотой ключик, или Приключения Буратино) (1936), Aleksey Nikolayevich Tolstoy	The Adventures of Buratino (1975)
The Golden Key, or the Adventures of Buratino (Russian: Золотой ключик, или Приключения Буратино) (1936), Aleksey Nikolayevich Tolstoy	The New Adventures of Buratino (Russian: Новейшие приключения Буратино) (1997)
The Golden Key, or the Adventures of Buratino (Russian: Золотой ключик, или Приключения Буратино) (1936), Aleksey Nikolayevich Tolstoy	Buratino, Son of Pinocchio (2009)
The Golden Key, or the Adventures of Buratino (Russian: Золотой ключик, или Приключения Буратино) (1936), Aleksey Nikolayevich Tolstoy	The Return of Buratino (Italian: Возвращение Буратино) (2013)
The Golden Key, or the Adventures of Buratino (Russian: Золотой ключик, или Приключения Буратино) (1936), Aleksey Nikolayevich Tolstoy	Buratino (Russian: Буратино) (2026)
Golden Slumber (Japanese: ゴールデンスランバー, romanized: Gōruden Surambā) (2007), Kōtarō Isaka	Golden Slumber (2018)
Goldfinger (1959), Ian Fleming	Goldfinger (1964)
Gone with the Wind (1936), Margaret Mitchell	Gone with the Wind (1939)
The Good Earth (1931), Pearl S. Buck	The Good Earth (1937)
The Good German (2001), Joseph Kanon	The Good German (2006)
Good Morning, Midnight (2016), Lily Brooks-Dalton	The Midnight Sky (2020)
A Good Year (2004), Peter Mayle	A Good Year (2006)
Goodbye Piccadilly, Farewell Leicester Square (1966), Arthur La Bern	Frenzy (1972)
Goodbye, Mr. Chips (1934), James Hilton	Goodbye, Mr. Chips (1939)
Goodbye, Mr. Chips (1934), James Hilton	Goodbye, Mr. Chips (1969)
Gorky Park (1981), Martin Cruz Smith	Gorky Park (1983)
Grand Canary (1933), A. J. Cronin	Grand Canary (1934)
The Grapes of Wrath (1939), John Steinbeck	The Grapes of Wrath (1940)
Graveyard of Honor (Japanese: 仁義の墓場, romanized: Jingi no Hakaba) (1973), Fujita Goro	Graveyard of Honor (1975)
Graveyard of Honor (Japanese: 仁義の墓場, romanized: Jingi no Hakaba) (1973), Fujita Goro	Graveyard of Honor (1966)
The Great Bank Robbery (1969), Frank O'Rourke	The Great Bank Robbery (1969)
The Great Dinosaur Robbery (1970), David Forrest (Note: Pseudonym of writers David Eliades and Robert Forrest Webb.)	One of Our Dinosaurs Is Missing (1975)
Great Expectations (1861), (Note: Serialised 1860–1861; published as a book 1861.) Charles Dickens	Great Expectations (1917)
Great Expectations (1861), Charles Dickens	Great Expectations (1922)
Great Expectations (1861), Charles Dickens	Great Expectations (1934)
Great Expectations (1861), Charles Dickens	Great Expectations (1946)
Great Expectations (1861), Charles Dickens	Great Expectations (1974)
Great Expectations (1861), Charles Dickens	Great Expectations (1983)
Great Expectations (1861), Charles Dickens	Great Expectations (1998)
Great Expectations (1861), Charles Dickens	Great Expectations (1999)
Great Expectations (1861), Charles Dickens	Great Expectations (2012)
Great Expectations (1861), Charles Dickens	Fitoor (Hindi: फितूर) (2016)
The Great Gatsby (1925), F. Scott Fitzgerald	The Great Gatsby (1926)
The Great Gatsby (1925), F. Scott Fitzgerald	The Great Gatsby (1949)
The Great Gatsby (1925), F. Scott Fitzgerald	The Great Gatsby (1974)
The Great Gatsby (1925), F. Scott Fitzgerald	The Great Gatsby (2000)
The Great Gatsby (1925), F. Scott Fitzgerald	G (2002)
The Great Gatsby (1925), F. Scott Fitzgerald	The Great Gatsby (2013)
The Great Man (1955), Al Morgan	The Great Man (1956)
The Great Bodhisattva Pass (Japanese: 大菩薩峠, romanized: Dai-bosatsu tōge) (1981), Teru Miyamoto	Daibosatsu-tōge: Dai-ippen ~ Kogen Itto-ryu no Maki (1935)
The Great Bodhisattva Pass (Japanese: 大菩薩峠, romanized: Dai-bosatsu tōge) (1981), Teru Miyamoto	Daibosatsu-tōge: Suzuka Yama no Maki ~ Mibu to Shimabara no Maki (1936)
The Great Bodhisattva Pass (Japanese: 大菩薩峠, romanized: Dai-bosatsu tōge) (1981), Teru Miyamoto	Merciless Blade (1953)
The Great Bodhisattva Pass (Japanese: 大菩薩峠, romanized: Dai-bosatsu tōge) (1981), Teru Miyamoto	Merciless Blade Part 2 (1953)
The Great Bodhisattva Pass (Japanese: 大菩薩峠, romanized: Dai-bosatsu tōge) (1981), Teru Miyamoto	Merciless Blade Part 3 (1953)
The Great Bodhisattva Pass (Japanese: 大菩薩峠, romanized: Dai-bosatsu tōge) (1981), Teru Miyamoto	Sword in the Moonlight (1957)
The Great Bodhisattva Pass (Japanese: 大菩薩峠, romanized: Dai-bosatsu tōge) (1981), Teru Miyamoto	Sword in the Moonlight II (1958)
The Great Bodhisattva Pass (Japanese: 大菩薩峠, romanized: Dai-bosatsu tōge) (1981), Teru Miyamoto	Sword in the Moonlight III (1959)
The Great Bodhisattva Pass (Japanese: 大菩薩峠, romanized: Dai-bosatsu tōge) (1981), Teru Miyamoto	Satan's Sword (1960)
The Great Bodhisattva Pass (Japanese: 大菩薩峠, romanized: Dai-bosatsu tōge) (1981), Teru Miyamoto	Satan's Sword II (1960)
The Great Bodhisattva Pass (Japanese: 大菩薩峠, romanized: Dai-bosatsu tōge) (1981), Teru Miyamoto	Satan's Sword III: The Final Chapter (1961)
The Great Bodhisattva Pass (Japanese: 大菩薩峠, romanized: Dai-bosatsu tōge) (1981), Teru Miyamoto	The Sword of Doom (1966)
The Great Santini (1976), Pat Conroy	The Great Santini (1979)
The Great Train Robbery (1975), Michael Crichton	The First Great Train Robbery (1979)
The Great West That Was: "Buffalo Bill's" Life Story, (Note: First published as a Hearst's International Magazine serial from August 1916 to July 1917, it was later published in 1920 in book form as An Autobiography of Buffalo Bill (Colonel W. F. Cody), accompanied by illustrations by N. C. Wyeth.) William "Buffalo Bill" Cody (Note: Ghostwritten by James J. Montague.)	The Indians are Coming (1930)
The Great West That Was: "Buffalo Bill's" Life Story, William "Buffalo Bill" Cody	Rustlers of Red Dog (1935)
Green for Danger (1944), Christianna Brand	Green for Danger (1946)
Green Mansions (1904), William Henry Hudson	Green Mansions (1959)
The Green Mile (1996) (Note: First published as a six-volume serial from March–August 1996 before being re-published as a complete book in May 1997.), Stephen King	The Green Mile (1999)
Green Wheat (French: Le Blé en herbe) (1923), Colette	Le Blé en herbe (1954)
Green Wheat (French: Le Blé en herbe) (1923), Colette	Le Blé en herbe (1990)
The Green Years (1944), A. J. Cronin	The Green Years (1946)
The Greengage Summer (1958), Rumer Godden	The Greengage Summer (1961)
Grendel (1971), John Gardner	Grendel Grendel Grendel (1981)
The Grifters (1963), Jim Thompson	The Grifters (1990)
The Grizzly King (1916), James Oliver Curwood	The Bear (French: L'Ours) (1988)
Gros-Câlin (1974), Romain Gary (Note: Written as Émile Ajar.)	Gros-Câlin (1979)
The Grotesque (1989), Patrick McGrath	The Grotesque (1995) a.k.a. Grave Indiscretion, Gentlemen Don't Eat Poets
The Group (1963), Mary McCarthy	The Group (1966)
The Guilty Head (French: La Tête coupable) (1969), Romain Gary	Les faussaires (1994)
Gulliver's Travels (1726), Jonathan Swift	Gulliver's Travels (German: Gullivers Reisen) (1924)
Gulliver's Travels (1726), Jonathan Swift	The New Gulliver (1935)
Gulliver's Travels (1726), Jonathan Swift	Gulliver's Travels (1939)
Gulliver's Travels (1726), Jonathan Swift	The 3 Worlds of Gulliver (1960)
Gulliver's Travels (1726), Jonathan Swift	Gulliver's Travels Beyond the Moon (1965)
Gulliver's Travels (1726), Jonathan Swift	Gulliver in the Country of Dwarfs (Hungarian: Gulliver a törpék országában) (1974)
Gulliver's Travels (1726), Jonathan Swift	Gulliver's Travels (1977)
Gulliver's Travels (1726), Jonathan Swift	Gulliver's Travels (1979)
Gulliver's Travels (1726), Jonathan Swift	Gulliver in the Country of Giants (Hungarian: Gulliver az óriások országában) (1980)
Gulliver's Travels (1726), Jonathan Swift	Gulliver's Travels (Spanish: Los viajes de Gulliver) (1983)
Gulliver's Travels (1726), Jonathan Swift	Gulliver's Travels (1996)
Gulliver's Travels (1726), Jonathan Swift	Crayola Kids Adventures: Tales of Gulliver's Travels (1997)
Gulliver's Travels (1726), Jonathan Swift	Jajantaram Mamantaram (Hindi: जाजंतरम ममंतरम) (2003)
Gulliver's Travels (1726), Jonathan Swift	Gulliver's Travel (2005)
Gulliver's Travels (1726), Jonathan Swift	Gulliver's Travels (2010)
Gulliver's Travels (1726), Jonathan Swift	Gulliver Returns (2021)
Gunman's Chance (1941), Luke Short	Blood on the Moon (1948)
The Guns of Navarone (1957), Alistair MacLean	The Guns of Navarone (1961)
Guns of the Timberland (1955), Louis L'Amour	Guns of the Timberland (1960)
The Gypsy Moths (1955), James William Drought (Note: Written as James Drought.)	The Gypsy Moths (1969)

== H ==
Fiction work(s)	Film adaptation(s)
H.M. Pulham, Esquire (1942), John P. Marquand	H.M. Pulham, Esq. (1941)
Hababam Sınıfı (1957—1987) (series) (Note: Works adapted from the series in chronological order: the first (Hababam Sınıfı (1957)), the second (Hababam Sınıfı Sınıfta Kaldı (1972)) and the third (Hababam Sınıfı Uyanıyor (1972)) respectively.), Rifat Ilgaz	Hababam Sınıfı (1975)
Hababam Sınıfı (1957—1987) (series), Rifat Ilgaz	Hababam Sınıfı Sınıfta Kaldı (1975)
Hababam Sınıfı (1957—1987) (series), Rifat Ilgaz	Hababam Sınıfı Uyanıyor (1976)
Hair from Above (Dutch: Haar van Boven) (1969) (Note: Conflated with another work What Do I See!? (Dutch: Wat zien ik!?) (1966) by the same author for the film adaptation.), Albert Mol	Business Is Business (1971)
A Hall of Mirrors (1967), Robert Stone	WUSA (1970)
The Hamlet (1940), William Faulkner	The Long, Hot Summer (1958)
Hammers Over the Anvil (1952), Alan Marshall	Hammers Over the Anvil (1991)
Hamnet (2020), Maggie O'Farrell	Hamnet (2025)
Hana no Furu Gogo (Japanese: 花の降る午後) (1988), Teru Miyamoto	Hana no Furu Gogo (1989)
The Handmaid's Tale (1985), Margaret Atwood	The Handmaid's Tale (1990)
Hannibal (1999), Thomas Harris	Hannibal (2001)
Happy Land (1943), MacKinlay Kantor	Happy Land (1943)
Al-Haram (Arabic: الحرام, Al-Haram) (1959), Yusuf Idris	The Sin (1965)
Hard to Be a God (Russian: Трудно быть богом) (1964), Arkady and Boris Strugatsky	Hard to Be a God (1989)
Hard to Be a God (Russian: Трудно быть богом) (1964), Arkady and Boris Strugatsky	Hard to Be a God (2008)
The Harder They Fall (1946), Budd Schulberg	The Harder They Fall (1956)
Harry Black (1956), David Walker	Harry Black (1958)
Harry Potter (1997–2007) (series) (Note: Works adapted from the series in chronological order: Philosopher's Stone (1997), Chamber of Secrets (1998), Prisoner of Azkaban (1999), Goblet of Fire (2000), Order of the Phoenix (2003), Half-Blood Prince (2005) and Deathly Hallows (2007).), J. K. Rowling	Harry Potter and the Philosopher's Stone (2001)
Harry Potter (1997–2007) (series), J. K. Rowling	Harry Potter and the Chamber of Secrets (2002)
Harry Potter (1997–2007) (series), J. K. Rowling	Harry Potter and the Prisoner of Azkaban (2004)
Harry Potter (1997–2007) (series), J. K. Rowling	Harry Potter and the Goblet of Fire (2005)
Harry Potter (1997–2007) (series), J. K. Rowling	Harry Potter and the Order of the Phoenix (2007)
Harry Potter (1997–2007) (series), J. K. Rowling	Harry Potter and the Half-Blood Prince (2009)
Harry Potter (1997–2007) (series), J. K. Rowling	Harry Potter and the Deathly Hallows – Part 1 (2010)
Harry Potter (1997–2007) (series), J. K. Rowling	Harry Potter and the Deathly Hallows – Part 2 (2011)
Hart's War (1999), John Katzenbach	Hart's War (2002)
Haruchika (Japanese: ハルチカ) (2008–present) (series), Sei Hatsuno	Haruta & Chika (2017)
The Harvest (Russian: Жатва) (1950), Galina Nikolayeva	The Return of Vasili Bortnikov (1953)
The Harvey Girls (1942), Samuel Hopkins Adams	The Harvey Girls (1946)
Hating Alison Ashley (1984), Robin Klein	Hating Alison Ashley (2005)
Hatter's Castle (1931), A. J. Cronin	Hatter's Castle (1942)
Haunted Harbor (1944), Ewart Adamson (as Dayle Douglas)	Haunted Harbor (1944)
The Haunting of Hill House (1959), Shirley Jackson	The Haunting (1963)
The Haunting of Hill House (1959), Shirley Jackson	The Haunting (1999)
Hawaii (1959), James A. Michener	Hawaii (1966)
Hawaii (1959), James A. Michener	The Hawaiians (1970)
Hawk of the Wilderness (1936), William L. Chester	Hawk of the Wilderness (1938)
He Ran All the Way (1948), Sam Ross	He Ran All the Way (1951)
Header (1995), Edward Lee	Header (2006)
Headhunters (2001), Jules Bass	Monte Carlo (2011)
Hear the Wind Sing (Japanese: 風の歌を聴け, romanized: Kaze no uta o kike) (1979), Haruki Murakami	Hear the Wind Sing (1981)
The Heart of the Matter (1948), Graham Greene	The Heart of the Matter (1953)
The Heart of the Matter (1948), Graham Greene	The Heart of the Matter (1983)
The Heaven Sword and Dragon Saber (Chinese: 倚天屠龙记) (1961), Jin Yong	Story of the Sword and the Sabre (1963–1965)
The Heaven Sword and Dragon Saber (Chinese: 倚天屠龙记) (1961), Jin Yong	Heaven Sword and Dragon Sabre (1978)
The Heaven Sword and Dragon Saber (Chinese: 倚天屠龙记) (1961), Jin Yong	The Hidden Power of the Dragon Sabre (1984)
The Heaven Sword and Dragon Saber (Chinese: 倚天屠龙记) (1961), Jin Yong	Kung Fu Cult Master (1993)
The Heaven Sword and Dragon Saber (Chinese: 倚天屠龙记) (1961), Jin Yong	New Kung Fu Cult Master 1 (2022)
The Heaven Sword and Dragon Saber (Chinese: 倚天屠龙记) (1961), Jin Yong	New Kung Fu Cult Master 2 (2022)
Heidi (1880–81), Johanna Spyri	Heidi (1937)
Heidi (1880–81), Johanna Spyri	Heidi (1952)
Heidi (1880–81), Johanna Spyri	Heidi and Peter (1955)
Heidi (1880–81), Johanna Spyri	A Gift for Heidi (1958)
Heidi (1880–81), Johanna Spyri	Do Phool (Hindi: दो फूल) (1958)
Heidi (1880–81), Johanna Spyri	Heidi (1965)
Heidi (1880–81), Johanna Spyri	Heidi (1968)
Heidi (1880–81), Johanna Spyri	The New Adventures of Heidi (1978)
Heidi (1880–81), Johanna Spyri	Heidi in the Mountains (1979)
Heidi (1880–81), Johanna Spyri	Heidi's Song (1982)
Heidi (1880–81), Johanna Spyri	Courage Mountain (1990)
Heidi (1880–81), Johanna Spyri	Heidi (1995)
Heidi (1880–81), Johanna Spyri	Heidi (2001)
Heidi (1880–81), Johanna Spyri	Heidi (2005) (Note: Animated film directed by Alan Simpson.)
Heidi (1880–81), Johanna Spyri	Heidi (2005; directed by Paul Marcus) (Note: Live action film directed by Paul Marcus.)
Heidi (1880–81), Johanna Spyri	Heidi 4 Paws (2008)
Heidi (1880–81), Johanna Spyri	Heidi (2015)
Heidi (1880–81), Johanna Spyri	Heidi: Queen of the Mountain (2017)
Heidi (1880–81), Johanna Spyri	Heidi (2024)
Heidi (1880–81), Johanna Spyri	Heidi: Rescue of the Lynx (2025)
Hell Has No Limits (Spanish: El lugar sin límites) (1966), José Donoso	The Place Without Limits (1978)
Hell House (1971), Richard Matheson	The Legend of Hell House (1973)
Heller with a Gun (1954), Louis L'Amour	Heller in Pink Tights (1960)
The Help (2009), Kathryn Stockett	The Help (2011)
The Heritage of the Desert (1910), Zane Grey	Heritage of the Desert (1924)
The Heritage of the Desert (1910), Zane Grey	Heritage of the Desert (1932)
The Heritage of the Desert (1910), Zane Grey	Heritage of the Desert (1939)
The High and the Mighty (1953), Ernest K. Gann	The High and the Mighty (1954)
High Fidelity (1995), Nick Hornby	High Fidelity (2000)
The History of Mr Polly (1910), H. G. Wells	The History of Mr. Polly (1949)
The History of Mr Polly (1910), H. G. Wells	The History of Mr Polly (2007)
The History of Tom Jones, a Foundling (1749), Henry Fielding	Tom Jones (1917)
The History of Tom Jones, a Foundling (1749), Henry Fielding	Tom Jones (1963)
The History of Tom Jones, a Foundling (1749), Henry Fielding	The Bawdy Adventures of Tom Jones (1976)
The History of Tom Jones, a Foundling (1749), Henry Fielding	Tom Jones (1996)
A History of Violence (1997), John Wagner	A History of Violence (2005)
The Hitchhiker's Guide to the Galaxy (1979) (Note: Based on the first four episodes of the eponymous 1978 radio series written by the original author.), Douglas Adams	The Hitchhiker's Guide to the Galaxy (2004)
The Hobbit (1937), J. R. R. Tolkien	The Hobbit (1977)
The Hobbit (1937), J. R. R. Tolkien	The Hobbit (1985)
The Hobbit (1937), J. R. R. Tolkien	The Hobbit: An Unexpected Journey (2012) (Note: The Hobbit (film series))
The Hobbit (1937), J. R. R. Tolkien	The Hobbit: The Desolation of Smaug (2013)
The Hobbit (1937), J. R. R. Tolkien	The Hobbit: The Battle of the Five Armies (2014)
The Holcroft Covenant (1978), Robert Ludlum	The Holcroft Covenant (1985)
The Holy Innocents (1988), Gilbert Adair	The Dreamers (2003)
Hombre (1961), Elmore Leonard	Hombre (1967)
The Home and the World (Bengali: ঘরে বাইরে, Ghôre Baire) (1916), Rabindranath Tagore	Ghare Baire (1984)
The Honorary Consul (1973), Graham Greene	The Honorary Consul (1983)
Hopalong Cassidy (1906—1941) (series) (Note: Works adapted from the series in chronological order: Bar-20 (1906), The Orphan (1908), Hopalong Cassidy (1910), Buck Peters, Ranchman (1912), The Man from Bar-20 (1918), The Bar-20 Three (1921), Tex (1922), Bring Me His Ears (1922), H. C. Returns (1923) Black Buttes (1923), Rustlers' Valley (1924), Cottonwood Gulch (1925), Hopalong Cassidy's Protege (1926), The Bar-20 Rides Again (1926), Corson of the J.C. (1927), Me an' Shorty (1929), Hopalong Cassidy and the Eagle's Brood (1931), Mesquite Jenkins, Tumbleweed (1932) The Round-Up (1933), Trail Dust (1934), On the Trail of the Tumbling T (1935) and Hopalong Cassidy Serves a Writ (1941).), Clarence E. Mulford	The Orphan (1920)
Hopalong Cassidy (1906—1941) (series), Clarence E. Mulford	The Deadwood Coach (1924)
Hopalong Cassidy (1906—1941) (series), Clarence E. Mulford	Hop-Along Cassidy (1935)
Hopalong Cassidy (1906—1941) (series), Clarence E. Mulford	The Eagle's Brood (1935)
Hopalong Cassidy (1906—1941) (series), Clarence E. Mulford	Call of the Prairie (1936)
Hopalong Cassidy (1906—1941) (series), Clarence E. Mulford	Three on the Trail (1936)
Hopalong Cassidy (1906—1941) (series), Clarence E. Mulford	Heart of the West (1936)
Hopalong Cassidy (1906—1941) (series), Clarence E. Mulford	Trail Dust (1936)
Hopalong Cassidy (1906—1941) (series), Clarence E. Mulford	Hills of Old Wyoming (1937)
Hopalong Cassidy (1906—1941) (series), Clarence E. Mulford	North of the Rio Grande (1937)
Hopalong Cassidy (1906—1941) (series), Clarence E. Mulford	Rustlers' Valley (1937)
Hopalong Cassidy (1906—1941) (series), Clarence E. Mulford	Hopalong Rides Again (1937)
Hopalong Cassidy (1906—1941) (series), Clarence E. Mulford	Texas Trail (1937)
Hopalong Cassidy (1906—1941) (series), Clarence E. Mulford	Partners of the Plains (1938)
Hopalong Cassidy (1906—1941) (series), Clarence E. Mulford	Heart of Arizona (1938)
Hopalong Cassidy (1906—1941) (series), Clarence E. Mulford	Bar 20 Justice (1938)
Hopalong Cassidy (1906—1941) (series), Clarence E. Mulford	In Old Mexico (1938)
Hopalong Cassidy (1906—1941) (series), Clarence E. Mulford	Silver on the Sage (1939)
Hopalong Cassidy (1906—1941) (series), Clarence E. Mulford	Stick to Your Guns (1941)
Hopalong Cassidy (1906—1941) (series), Clarence E. Mulford	Hoppy Serves a Writ (1943)
Hopalong Cassidy (1906—1941) (series), Clarence E. Mulford	Bar 20 (1943)
Horseman, Pass By (1961), Larry McMurtry	Hud (1963)
The Host (2008), Stephenie Meyer	The Host (2013)
The Hot Rock (1970), Donald E. Westlake	The Hot Rock (1972)
The Hound of Florence (German: Der Hund von Florenz) (1923), Felix Salten	The Shaggy Dog (1959)
The Hound of Florence (German: Der Hund von Florenz) (1923), Felix Salten	The Shaggy D.A. (1976)
The Hound of Florence (German: Der Hund von Florenz) (1923), Felix Salten	The Return of the Shaggy Dog (1987)
The Hound of Florence (German: Der Hund von Florenz) (1923), Felix Salten	The Shaggy Dog (1994)
The Hound of Florence (German: Der Hund von Florenz) (1923), Felix Salten	The Shaggy Dog (2006)
The Hound of the Baskervilles (1902) (Note: Serialised 1901—1902; published as a book 1902.), Arthur Conan Doyle	The Hound of the Baskervilles (German: Der Hund von Baskerville) (1914)
The Hound of the Baskervilles (1902), Arthur Conan Doyle	Der Hund von Baskerville, 2. Teil: Das einsame Haus (1914) (Note: Continuation of the 1914 film.)
The Hound of the Baskervilles (1902), Arthur Conan Doyle	Der Hund von Baskerville, III. Teil: Das unheimliche Zimmer (1915)
The Hound of the Baskervilles (1902), Arthur Conan Doyle	Der Hund von Baskerville, IV. Teil: Der geheimnisvolle Hund (1915)
The Hound of the Baskervilles (1902), Arthur Conan Doyle	Das dunkle Schloß (1915)
The Hound of the Baskervilles (1902), Arthur Conan Doyle	Der Bär von Baskerville (1915)
The Hound of the Baskervilles (1902), Arthur Conan Doyle	Der Hund von Baskerville, 5. Teil: Dr. Macdonalds Sanatorium (1920)
The Hound of the Baskervilles (1902), Arthur Conan Doyle	Der Hund von Baskerville, 6. Teil: Das Haus ohne Fenster (1920)
The Hound of the Baskervilles (1902), Arthur Conan Doyle	The Hound of the Baskervilles (1921)
The Hound of the Baskervilles (1902), Arthur Conan Doyle	The Hound of the Baskervilles (1929)
The Hound of the Baskervilles (1902), Arthur Conan Doyle	The Hound of the Baskervilles (1932)
The Hound of the Baskervilles (1902), Arthur Conan Doyle	The Hound of the Baskervilles (1937)
The Hound of the Baskervilles (1902), Arthur Conan Doyle	The Hound of the Baskervilles (1939)
The Hound of the Baskervilles (1902), Arthur Conan Doyle	Jighansa (Bengali: জিঘাংসা) (1951)
The Hound of the Baskervilles (1902), Arthur Conan Doyle	The Hound of the Baskervilles (1955)
The Hound of the Baskervilles (1902), Arthur Conan Doyle	The Hound of the Baskervilles (1959)
The Hound of the Baskervilles (1902), Arthur Conan Doyle	Bees Saal Baad (Hindi: बीस साल बाद) (1962)
The Hound of the Baskervilles (1902), Arthur Conan Doyle	The Hound of the Baskervilles (Hindi: Собака Баскервилей) (1971)
The Hound of the Baskervilles (1902), Arthur Conan Doyle	The Hound of the Baskervilles (1972)
The Hound of the Baskervilles (1902), Arthur Conan Doyle	The Hound of the Baskervilles (1978)
The Hound of the Baskervilles (1902), Arthur Conan Doyle	The Hound of the Baskervilles (1981)
The Hound of the Baskervilles (1902), Arthur Conan Doyle	Sherlock Holmes and the Baskerville Curse (1983)
The Hound of the Baskervilles (1902), Arthur Conan Doyle	The Hound of the Baskervilles (1983)
The Hound of the Baskervilles (1902), Arthur Conan Doyle	The Hound of the Baskervilles (2000)
The Hound of the Baskervilles (1902), Arthur Conan Doyle	The Hound of the Baskervilles (2002)
The Hound of the Baskervilles (1902), Arthur Conan Doyle	The Hound of the Baskervilles: Sherlock the Movie (Japanese: バスカヴィル家の犬 シャーロック劇場版, romanized: Basukebiruke no Inu: Sherokku no Gekijōban) (2022)
The Hour Before the Dawn (1942), W. Somerset Maugham	The Hour Before the Dawn (1944)
The Hours (1998), Michael Cunningham	The Hours (2002)
The House of the Lost on the Cape (Japanese: 岬のマヨイガ, romanized: Misaki no Mayoiga (2015), Sachiko Kashiwaba	The House of the Lost on the Cape (2021)
The House of the Spirits (Spanish: La casa de los espíritus) (1982), Isabel Allende	The House of the Spirits (1993)
The House Without a Key (1925), Earl Derr Biggers	The House Without a Key (1926)
The Housekeeper and the Professor (Japanese: 博士の愛した数式, romanized: hakase no ai shita suushiki) (2003), Yōko Ogawa	The Professor's Beloved Equation (2006)
The Housemaid (2022), Freida McFadden	The Housemaid (2025)
How Green Was My Valley (1939), Richard Llewellyn	How Green Was My Valley (1941)
Howards End (1910), E. M. Forster	Howards End (1992)
The Howling (1977), Gary Brandner	The Howling (1981)
The Howling (1977), Gary Brandner	Howling II: Stirba - Werewolf Bitch (1985) (Note: No relation to the novel which shared a similar title The Howling II (1979).)
The Howling (1977), Gary Brandner	Howling III (1987) (Note: No relation to the novel which shared a similar title The Howling III: Echoes (1985).)
The Howling (1977), Gary Brandner	Howling IV: The Original Nightmare (1988)
The Howling (1977), Gary Brandner	Howling V: The Rebirth (1990)
The Howling (1977), Gary Brandner	Howling VI: The Freaks (1992)
The Howling (1977), Gary Brandner	Howling: New Moon Rising (1994)
The Howling (1977), Gary Brandner	The Howling: Reborn (2011)
The Human Condition (Japanese: 人間の條件, romanized: Ningen no jōken) (1958), Junpei Gomikawa	No Greater Love (Japanese: 第一部 純愛篇／第二部 激怒篇) (1959)
The Human Condition (Japanese: 人間の條件, romanized: Ningen no jōken) (1958), Junpei Gomikawa	Road to Eternity (1959)
The Human Condition (Japanese: 人間の條件, romanized: Ningen no jōken) (1958), Junpei Gomikawa	A Soldier's Prayer (Japanese: 人間の條件 完結篇) (1961)
The Human Stain (2000), Philip Roth	The Human Stain (2003)
The Hunchback of Notre-Dame (French: Notre-Dame de Paris. 1482) (1831), Victor Hugo	Esmeralda (1905)
The Hunchback of Notre-Dame (French: Notre-Dame de Paris. 1482) (1831), Victor Hugo	The Hunchback of Notre Dame (1911)
The Hunchback of Notre-Dame (French: Notre-Dame de Paris. 1482) (1831), Victor Hugo	The Darling of Paris (1917)
The Hunchback of Notre-Dame (French: Notre-Dame de Paris. 1482) (1831), Victor Hugo	Esmeralda (1922)
The Hunchback of Notre-Dame (French: Notre-Dame de Paris. 1482) (1831), Victor Hugo	The Hunchback of Notre Dame (1923)
The Hunchback of Notre-Dame (French: Notre-Dame de Paris. 1482) (1831), Victor Hugo	The Hunchback of Notre Dame (1939)
The Hunchback of Notre-Dame (French: Notre-Dame de Paris. 1482) (1831), Victor Hugo	The Hunchback of Notre Dame (1956)
The Hunchback of Notre-Dame (French: Notre-Dame de Paris. 1482) (1831), Victor Hugo	Return to Manhood (Japanese: 南蛮寺の佝楼男, romanized: Nanbanji no semushi-otoko) (1957)
The Hunchback of Notre-Dame (French: Notre-Dame de Paris. 1482) (1831), Victor Hugo	Kubra Aashiq (Urdu: کبڑا عاشق) (1973)
The Hunchback of Notre-Dame (French: Notre-Dame de Paris. 1482) (1831), Victor Hugo	The Hunchback of Notre Dame (1976)
The Hunchback of Notre-Dame (French: Notre-Dame de Paris. 1482) (1831), Victor Hugo	The Hunchback of Notre Dame (1982)
The Hunchback of Notre-Dame (French: Notre-Dame de Paris. 1482) (1831), Victor Hugo	The Hunchback of Notre Dame (1986)
The Hunchback of Notre-Dame (French: Notre-Dame de Paris. 1482) (1831), Victor Hugo	The Secret of the Hunchback (1996)
The Hunchback of Notre-Dame (French: Notre-Dame de Paris. 1482) (1831), Victor Hugo	The Hunchback of Notre Dame (1996; Golden Films)
The Hunchback of Notre-Dame (French: Notre-Dame de Paris. 1482) (1831), Victor Hugo	The Hunchback of Notre Dame (1996; Jetlag Productions)
The Hunchback of Notre-Dame (French: Notre-Dame de Paris. 1482) (1831), Victor Hugo	The Hunchback of Notre Dame (1996; Burbank Animation Studios)
The Hunchback of Notre-Dame (French: Notre-Dame de Paris. 1482) (1831), Victor Hugo	The Hunchback of Notre Dame (1996; Walt Disney Animation Studios)
The Hunchback of Notre-Dame (French: Notre-Dame de Paris. 1482) (1831), Victor Hugo	The Hunchback of Notre Dame (1996; Dingo Pictures)
The Hunchback of Notre-Dame (French: Notre-Dame de Paris. 1482) (1831), Victor Hugo	The Hunchback (1997)
The Hunchback of Notre-Dame (French: Notre-Dame de Paris. 1482) (1831), Victor Hugo	Quasimodo d'El Paris (1999)
The Hunchback of Notre-Dame (French: Notre-Dame de Paris. 1482) (1831), Victor Hugo	The Hunchback of Notre Dame II (2002) (Note: Sequel to the 1996 film.)
The Hunchback of Notre-Dame (French: Notre-Dame de Paris. 1482) (1831), Victor Hugo	Quasi (2023)
The Hundred and One Dalmatians (1956), Dodie Smith	One Hundred and One Dalmatians (1961)
The Hundred and One Dalmatians (1956), Dodie Smith	101 Dalmatians (1996)
The Hundred and One Dalmatians (1956), Dodie Smith	102 Dalmatians (2000) (Note: Sequel to the 1996 live action film.)
The Hundred and One Dalmatians (1956), Dodie Smith	101 Dalmatians II: Patch's London Adventure (2003) (Note: Sequel to the 1961 animated film.)
The Hundred and One Dalmatians (1956), Dodie Smith	Cruella (2021)
The Hunger Games (2008–2010, 2020–2025) (series) (Note: Works adapted from the series in chronological order: The Hunger Games (2008), Catching Fire (2009), Mockingjay (2010), The Ballad of Songbirds and Snakes (2020) and Sunrise on the Reaping (2025).), Suzanne Collins	The Hunger Games (2012)
The Hunger Games (2008–2010, 2020–2025) (series), Suzanne Collins	The Hunger Games: Catching Fire (2013)
The Hunger Games (2008–2010, 2020–2025) (series), Suzanne Collins	The Hunger Games: Mockingjay - Part 1 (2014)
The Hunger Games (2008–2010, 2020–2025) (series), Suzanne Collins	The Hunger Games: Mockingjay - Part 2 (2015)
The Hunger Games (2008–2010, 2020–2025) (series), Suzanne Collins	The Hunger Games: The Ballad of Songbirds & Snakes (2023)
The Hunger Games (2008–2010, 2020–2025) (series), Suzanne Collins	The Hunger Games: Sunrise on the Reaping (2026)
The Hunt for Red October (1984), Tom Clancy	The Hunt for Red October (1990)
The Hunter (1962), Donald E. Westlake (Note: Written as Richard Stark.)	Point Blank (1967)
The Hunter (1962), Donald E. Westlake	Payback (1999)
The Hunter (1962), Donald E. Westlake	Play Dirty (2025) (Note: Based on characters only.)
The Hustler (1959), Walter Tevis	The Hustler (1961)

== I ==
Fiction work(s)	Film adaptation(s)
I Am Legend (1954), Richard Matheson	The Last Man on Earth (1964)
I Am Legend (1954), Richard Matheson	The Omega Man (1971)
I Am Legend (1954), Richard Matheson	I Am Legend (2007)
I Am Legend (1954), Richard Matheson	I Am Ωmega (2007) (Note: Uncredited adaptation.)
I Am Number Four (2010), Pittacus Lore	I Am Number Four (2011)
I Know What You Did Last Summer (1973), Lois Duncan	I Know What You Did Last Summer (1997)
I Know What You Did Last Summer (1973), Lois Duncan	I Still Know What You Did Last Summer (2000)
I Know What You Did Last Summer (1973), Lois Duncan	I'll Always Know What You Did Last Summer (2006)
I Know What You Did Last Summer (1973), Lois Duncan	I Know What You Did Last Summer (2025)
I Love You, Beth Cooper (2007), Larry Doyle	I Love You, Beth Cooper (2009)
I Want to Eat Your Pancreas (Japanese: 君の膵臓をたべたい, romanized: Kimi no Suizō o Tabetai) (2014), Yoru Sumino	Let Me Eat Your Pancreas (2017)
I Want to Eat Your Pancreas (Japanese: 君の膵臓をたべたい, romanized: Kimi no Suizō o Tabetai) (2014), Yoru Sumino	I Want to Eat Your Pancreas (2018)
Ice Station Zebra (1963), Alistair MacLean	Ice Station Zebra (1968)
If I Die Before I Wake (1938), Sherwood King	The Lady from Shanghai (1947)
The IPCRESS File (1962), Len Deighton	The Ipcress File (1965)
The Illustrated Man (1951), Ray Bradbury	The Illustrated Man (1968)
I'm Thinking of Ending Things (2016), Iain Reid	I'm Thinking of Ending Things (2020)
Imagining Argentina (1987), Lawrence Thornton	Imagining Argentina (2003)
Immortality, Inc. (1959), Robert Sheckley	Freejack (1992)
An Imperfect Lover (1928), Robert Gore-Browne	Cynara (1932)
In Country (1985), Bobbie Ann Mason	In Country (1989)
The Incredible Journey (1961), Sheila Burnford	The Incredible Journey (1963)
The Incredible Journey (1961), Sheila Burnford	Homeward Bound: The Incredible Journey (1993)
The Incredible Journey (1961), Sheila Burnford	Homeward Bound II: Lost in San Francisco (1996)
Incubus (1976), Ray Russell	The Incubus (1981)
The Innocent (1990), Ian McEwan	The Innocent (1993)
In Search of the Castaways (French: Les Enfants du capitaine Grant) (1873) (Note: Serialised 1867–1868; published as a book 1873.), Jules Verne	The Children of Captain Grant (Russian: Дети капитана Гранта, romanized: Deti kapitana Granta) (1936)
In Search of the Castaways (French: Les Enfants du capitaine Grant) (1873), Jules Verne	In Search of the Castaways (1962)
Instruct My Sorrows (1942), Clare Jaynes	My Reputation (1946)
Interview with the Vampire (1976), Anne Rice	Interview with the Vampire (1994)
The Investigation (1977), Dorothy Uhnak	Kojak: The Price of Justice (1987)
The Invisible Man (1897), H. G. Wells	The Invisible Man (1933)
The Invisible Man (1897), H. G. Wells	The Invisible Man Returns (1940)
The Invisible Man (1897), H. G. Wells	The Invisible Woman (1940)
The Invisible Man (1897), H. G. Wells	Invisible Agent (1942)
The Invisible Man (1897), H. G. Wells	The Invisible Man's Revenge (1944)
The Invisible Man (1897), H. G. Wells	Abbott and Costello Meet the Invisible Man (1951)
The Invisible Man (1897), H. G. Wells	The Invisible Man (1975)
The Invisible Man (1897), H. G. Wells	The Invisible Man (Russian: Человек-невидимка, romanized: Chelovek-nevidimka) (1984)
The Invisible Man (1897), H. G. Wells	The Invisible Man (2020)
In the Heat of the Night (1965), John Bell	In the Heat of the Night (1967)
In the Heat of the Night (1965), John Bell	They Call Me MISTER Tibbs! (1970)
In the Heat of the Night (1965), John Bell	The Organization (1971)
In This House of Brede (1969), Rumer Godden	In This House of Brede (1975)
The Iron Trail (1913), Rex Beach	The Iron Trail (1921)
Ironweed (1983), William Kennedy	Ironweed (1987)
The Island (1979), Peter Benchley	The Island (1980)
Island in the Sky (1944), Ernest K. Gann	Island in the Sky (1953)
The Island of Doctor Moreau (1896), H. G. Wells	The Island of the Lost (German: Die Insel der Verschollenen) (1921)
The Island of Doctor Moreau (1896), H. G. Wells	Island of Lost Souls (1932)
The Island of Doctor Moreau (1896), H. G. Wells	Terror Is a Man (1959)
The Island of Doctor Moreau (1896), H. G. Wells	The Twilight People (1972)
The Island of Doctor Moreau (1896), H. G. Wells	The Island of Dr. Moreau (1977)
The Island of Doctor Moreau (1896), H. G. Wells	The Island of Dr. Moreau (1996)
The Island of Doctor Moreau (1896), H. G. Wells	Dr. Moreau's House of Pain (2004)
Islands in the Stream (1970), Ernest Hemingway	Islands in the Stream (1977)
It (1986), Stephen King	It Chapter One (2017)
It (1986), Stephen King	It Chapter Two (2019)
It Can't Happen Here (1935), Sinclair Lewis	Shadow on the Land (1968) a.k.a. United States: It Can't Happen Here
It Ends with Us (2016), Colleen Hoover	It Ends with Us (2024)
Ivanhoe (1820), Sir Walter Scott	Ivanhoe (1913; British)
Ivanhoe (1820), Sir Walter Scott	Ivanhoe (1913; American)
Ivanhoe (1820), Sir Walter Scott	Ivanhoe (1952)
Ivanhoe (1820), Sir Walter Scott	Ivanhoe (1975)
Ivanhoe (1820), Sir Walter Scott	Ivanhoe (1982)
Ivanhoe (1820), Sir Walter Scott	The Revenge of Ivanhoe (Italian: La rivincita di Ivanhoe) (1965)
Ivanhoe (1820), Sir Walter Scott	Ivanhoe, the Norman Swordsman (Italian: La spada normanna) (1972)
Ivanhoe (1820), Sir Walter Scott	The Ballad of the Valiant Knight Ivanhoe (Russian: Баллада о доблестном рыцаре Айвенго) (1983)
Ivanhoe (1820), Sir Walter Scott	Ivanhoe (1986)
Ivanhoe (1820), Sir Walter Scott	Young Ivanhoe (1995)
Ivanhoe (1820), Sir Walter Scott	The Legend of Ivanhoe (1999)

== J ==
Fiction work(s)	Film adaptation(s)
Jack in the Box (1980), William Kotzwinkle	Book of Love (1990)
Jack's Return Home (1970), Ted Lewis	Get Carter (1971)
Jack's Return Home (1970), Ted Lewis	Hit Man (1972)
Jack's Return Home (1970), Ted Lewis	Get Carter (2000)
Jane Eyre (1847), Charlotte Brontë (Note: Written as Currer Bell.)	Jane Eyre (1910)
Jane Eyre (1847), Charlotte Brontë	Woman and Wife (1918)
Jane Eyre (1847), Charlotte Brontë	Orphan of Lowood (1926)
Jane Eyre (1847), Charlotte Brontë	Jane Eyre (1934)
Jane Eyre (1847), Charlotte Brontë	I Walked with a Zombie (1943)
Jane Eyre (1847), Charlotte Brontë	Jane Eyre (1943)
Jane Eyre (1847), Charlotte Brontë	Sangdil (1952)
Jane Eyre (1847), Charlotte Brontë	Bedi Bandavalu (1968)
Jane Eyre (1847), Charlotte Brontë	Jane Eyre (1970)
Jane Eyre (1847), Charlotte Brontë	Shanti Nilayam (1972)
Jane Eyre (1847), Charlotte Brontë	Jane Eyre (1996)
Jane Eyre (1847), Charlotte Brontë	Jane Eyre (1997)
Jane Eyre (1847), Charlotte Brontë	Jane Eyre (2011)
Japan Sinks (日本沈没, Nippon Chinbotsu) (1973), Sakyo Komatsu	Submersion of Japan (1973)
Japan Sinks (日本沈没, Nippon Chinbotsu) (1973), Sakyo Komatsu	Sinking of Japan (2006)
Jassy (1944), Norah Lofts	Jassy (1947)
Jaws (1974), Peter Benchley	Jaws (1975)
Jaws (1974), Peter Benchley	Jaws 2 (1978)
Jaws (1974), Peter Benchley	Jaws 3-D (1983)
Jaws (1974), Peter Benchley	Jaws: The Revenge (1987)
Jean le Bleu (1932), Jean Giono	The Baker's Wife (French: La femme du boulanger) (1938)
The Jewel of Seven Stars (1903), Bram Stoker	Blood from the Mummy's Tomb (1971)
The Jewel of Seven Stars (1903), Bram Stoker	The Awakening (1980)
The Jewel of Seven Stars (1903), Bram Stoker	Bram Stoker's Legend of the Mummy (1997)
Jim Kane (1970), Joseph P. Brown	Pocket Money (1972)
Jimmy the Kid (1967), Donald E. Westlake	Come ti rapisco il pupo (1976)
Jimmy the Kid (1967), Donald E. Westlake	Jimmy the Kid (1982)
Jimmy the Kid (1967), Donald E. Westlake	Jimmy the Kid (1998)
Jitter Joint (1999), Howard Swindle	D-Tox (2002)
Johnny Tremain (1944), Esther Forbes	Johnny Tremain (1957)
Joker Game (Japanese: ジョーカー・ゲーム, romanized: Jōkā Gēmu) (2008), Koji Yanagi	Joker Game (2015)
Josepha (1981), Christopher Frank	Josepha (1982)
A Journey to Matecumbe (1961), Robert Lewis Taylor	Treasure of Matecumbe (1976)
Journey to Shiloh (1960), Henry Wilson Allen	Journey to Shiloh (1968)
Journey to the Center of the Earth (French: Voyage au centre de la Terre) (1864), Jules Verne	Journey to the Center of the Earth (1959)
Journey to the Center of the Earth (French: Voyage au centre de la Terre) (1864), Jules Verne	A Journey to the Center of the Earth (1977)
Journey to the Center of the Earth (French: Voyage au centre de la Terre) (1864), Jules Verne	Where Time Began (Spanish: Viaje al centro de la Tierra) (1978)
Journey to the Center of the Earth (French: Voyage au centre de la Terre) (1864), Jules Verne	Journey to the Center of the Earth (1989)
Journey to the Center of the Earth (French: Voyage au centre de la Terre) (1864), Jules Verne	Journey to the Center of the Earth (1993)
Journey to the Center of the Earth (French: Voyage au centre de la Terre) (1864), Jules Verne	Journey to the Center of the Earth (1996)
Journey to the Center of the Earth (French: Voyage au centre de la Terre) (1864), Jules Verne	Journey to the Center of the Earth (2008; New Line Cinema)
Journey to the Center of the Earth (French: Voyage au centre de la Terre) (1864), Jules Verne	Journey to the Center of the Earth (2008; RHI Entertainment)
Journey to the Center of the Earth (French: Voyage au centre de la Terre) (1864), Jules Verne	Journey to the Center of the Earth (2008; The Asylum)
Journey to the West (Chinese: 西遊記, Xī Yóu Jì) (c. 1592), Wu Cheng'en	The Cave of the Silken Web (盤絲洞; Pan Si Dong) (1927)
Journey to the West (Chinese: 西遊記, Xī Yóu Jì) (c. 1592), Wu Cheng'en	The Cave of the Silken Web II (續盤絲洞; 续盘丝洞; Xu Pan Si Dong) (1930)
Journey to the West (Chinese: 西遊記, Xī Yóu Jì) (c. 1592), Wu Cheng'en	Princess Iron Fan (鐵扇公主; Tiě shàn gōngzhǔ) (1941)
Journey to the West (Chinese: 西遊記, Xī Yóu Jì) (c. 1592), Wu Cheng'en	Red Boy (紅孩兒; Hóng Hái-er) (1949)
Journey to the West (Chinese: 西遊記, Xī Yóu Jì) (c. 1592), Wu Cheng'en	The Big Fight Between Red Kid and Five Dragon Princess (紅孩兒大戰五龍公主; Hong Hai Er Da Zhan Wu Long Gong Zhu) (1949)
Journey to the West (Chinese: 西遊記, Xī Yóu Jì) (c. 1592), Wu Cheng'en	Red Kid and Monkey King (紅孩兒大戰孫悟空; Hong Hai Er Da Zhan Sun Wu Kong) (1957)
Journey to the West (Chinese: 西遊記, Xī Yóu Jì) (c. 1592), Wu Cheng'en	How Red Kid Rescued His Mother from the Crystal Palace (紅孩兒水晶宮救母; Hong Hai Er Shui Jing Gong Jiu Mu) (1959)
Journey to the West (Chinese: 西遊記, Xī Yóu Jì) (c. 1592), Wu Cheng'en	Monkey Sun (孫悟空, Son Gokū) (1959)
Journey to the West (Chinese: 西遊記, Xī Yóu Jì) (c. 1592), Wu Cheng'en	Alakazam the Great (西遊記, Saiyūki) (1960)
Journey to the West (Chinese: 西遊記, Xī Yóu Jì) (c. 1592), Wu Cheng'en	Havoc in Heaven (大鬧天宮; Dà nào tiān gōng) (1961)
Journey to the West (Chinese: 西遊記, Xī Yóu Jì) (c. 1592), Wu Cheng'en	Red Boy (1962)
Journey to the West (Chinese: 西遊記, Xī Yóu Jì) (c. 1592), Wu Cheng'en	Monkey Goes West (1966)
Journey to the West (Chinese: 西遊記, Xī Yóu Jì) (c. 1592), Wu Cheng'en	Princess Iron Fan (1966)
Journey to the West (Chinese: 西遊記, Xī Yóu Jì) (c. 1592), Wu Cheng'en	The Cave of the Silken Web (1967)
Journey to the West (Chinese: 西遊記, Xī Yóu Jì) (c. 1592), Wu Cheng'en	The Land of Many Perfumes (女兒國; Nü'er Guo) (1968)
Journey to the West (Chinese: 西遊記, Xī Yóu Jì) (c. 1592), Wu Cheng'en	Battles with the Red Boy (孫悟空大戰紅孩兒; Sun Wu Kong Da Zhan Hong Hai Er) (1972)
Journey to the West (Chinese: 西遊記, Xī Yóu Jì) (c. 1592), Wu Cheng'en	The Fantastic Magic Baby (紅孩兒) (1975)
Journey to the West (Chinese: 西遊記, Xī Yóu Jì) (c. 1592), Wu Cheng'en	Monkey King with 72 Magic (新孫悟空72變; Hou wang da zhan tian bing tian jiang) (1976)
Journey to the West (Chinese: 西遊記, Xī Yóu Jì) (c. 1592), Wu Cheng'en	Ginseng Fruit (人参果; Renshenguo) (1981)
Journey to the West (Chinese: 西遊記, Xī Yóu Jì) (c. 1592), Wu Cheng'en	New Pilgrims to the West (新西遊記; Xīnxīyóujì) (1982)
Journey to the West (Chinese: 西遊記, Xī Yóu Jì) (c. 1592), Wu Cheng'en	Monkey War (新西遊記續集 孫悟空大戰飛人國; Sun Wu Kong dai zhan fei ren kuo) (1982)
Journey to the West (Chinese: 西遊記, Xī Yóu Jì) (c. 1592), Wu Cheng'en	The Monkey King Conquers the Demon (金猴降妖; Jīn hóu jiàng yāo) (1985)
Journey to the West (Chinese: 西遊記, Xī Yóu Jì) (c. 1592), Wu Cheng'en	Go West to Subdue Demons (西行平妖; Xi Xing Ping Yao) (1992)
Journey to the West (Chinese: 西遊記, Xī Yóu Jì) (c. 1592), Wu Cheng'en	A Chinese Odyssey Part One: Pandora's Box (西遊記第壹佰零壹回之月光寶盒; Xīyóujì Dì Yībǎilíngyī Huí Zhī Yuèguāng Bǎohé) (1995)
Journey to the West (Chinese: 西遊記, Xī Yóu Jì) (c. 1592), Wu Cheng'en	A Chinese Odyssey Part Two: Cinderella (西遊記大結局之仙履奇緣; Xīyóujì Dà Jiéjú Zhī Xiānlǚ Qíyuán) (1995)
Journey to the West (Chinese: 西遊記, Xī Yóu Jì) (c. 1592), Wu Cheng'en	Heavenly Legend (1998)
Journey to the West (Chinese: 西遊記, Xī Yóu Jì) (c. 1592), Wu Cheng'en	My Son Goku (ぼくの孫悟空) (2003)
Journey to the West (Chinese: 西遊記, Xī Yóu Jì) (c. 1592), Wu Cheng'en	A Chinese Tall Story (Chinese: 情癲大聖; Cantonese Yale: Ching din dai sing) (2005)
Journey to the West (Chinese: 西遊記, Xī Yóu Jì) (c. 1592), Wu Cheng'en	Fire Ball (紅孩兒：決戰火焰山) (2005)
Journey to the West (Chinese: 西遊記, Xī Yóu Jì) (c. 1592), Wu Cheng'en	Monkey King vs. Er Lang Shen (孙悟空大战二郎神) (2007)
Journey to the West (Chinese: 西遊記, Xī Yóu Jì) (c. 1592), Wu Cheng'en	Monkey Magic: The Movie (2007)
Journey to the West (Chinese: 西遊記, Xī Yóu Jì) (c. 1592), Wu Cheng'en	The Forbidden Kingdom (2008)
Journey to the West (Chinese: 西遊記, Xī Yóu Jì) (c. 1592), Wu Cheng'en	Journey to the West: Conquering the Demons (西遊·降魔篇) (2013)
Journey to the West (Chinese: 西遊記, Xī Yóu Jì) (c. 1592), Wu Cheng'en	The Monkey King (西游記之大鬧天宮; Xī Yóu Jì Dà Nào Tiān Gōng) (2014)
Journey to the West (Chinese: 西遊記, Xī Yóu Jì) (c. 1592), Wu Cheng'en	Monkey King: Hero Is Back (西游记之大圣归来; Xīyóu jì zhī dà shèng guīlái) (2015)
Journey to the West (Chinese: 西遊記, Xī Yóu Jì) (c. 1592), Wu Cheng'en	The Monkey King 2 (西遊記之孫悟空三打白骨精; Xī yóu jì Sūn Wùkōng sān dǎ báigǔjīng) (2016)
Journey to the West (Chinese: 西遊記, Xī Yóu Jì) (c. 1592), Wu Cheng'en	A Chinese Odyssey Part Three (大话西游3) (2016)
Journey to the West (Chinese: 西遊記, Xī Yóu Jì) (c. 1592), Wu Cheng'en	Journey to the West: The Demons Strike Back (西遊伏妖篇) (2017)
Journey to the West (Chinese: 西遊記, Xī Yóu Jì) (c. 1592), Wu Cheng'en	The Monkey King 3 (西遊記女兒國; Xī yóu jì nǚ'ér guó) (2018)
Journey to the West (Chinese: 西遊記, Xī Yóu Jì) (c. 1592), Wu Cheng'en	The Monkey King (2023)
Journey Under the Midnight Sun (Japanese: 白夜行, romanized: Byakuyakō) (1999), Keigo Higashino	White Night (Korean: 백야행: 하얀 어둠 속을 걷다; RR: Baegyahaeng: hayan eodum sogeul geotda) (2009)
Journey Under the Midnight Sun (Japanese: 白夜行, romanized: Byakuyakō) (1999), Keigo Higashino	Into the White Night (2010)
The Joy Luck Club (1989), Amy Tan	The Joy Luck Club (1993)
Jude the Obscure (1895), Thomas Hardy	Jude (1996)
The Judgment (Thai: คำพิพากษา) (1981), Chart Korbjitti	Ai-Fak (Thai: ไอ้ฟัก) (2004)
A Judgement in Stone (1977), Ruth Rendell	La Cérémonie (1995)
The Juggler (1965), Donald E. Westlake	Made in U.S.A. (1966)
The Jungle (1906), Upton Sinclair	The Jungle (1914)
The Jungle Book (1894–1895) (Note: Originally published as two separate volumes: The Jungle Book (1894) and The Second Jungle Book (1895).), Rudyard Kipling	Elephant Boy (1937)
The Jungle Book (1894–1895), Rudyard Kipling	Rudyard Kipling's Jungle Book (1942)
The Jungle Book (1894–1895), Rudyard Kipling	The Jungle Book (1967)
The Jungle Book (1894–1895), Rudyard Kipling	Adventures of Mowgli (1973) (Note: Originally released as a five-part series of 20-minute short films from 1967–1971.)
The Jungle Book (1894–1895), Rudyard Kipling	The Jungle Book (1992)
The Jungle Book (1894–1895), Rudyard Kipling	Rudyard Kipling's The Jungle Book (1994)
The Jungle Book (1894–1895), Rudyard Kipling	Jungle Book (1995)
The Jungle Book (1894–1895), Rudyard Kipling	The Second Jungle Book: Mowgli & Baloo (1997)
The Jungle Book (1894–1895), Rudyard Kipling	Jungle Book: Mowgli's Story (1998)
The Jungle Book (1894–1895), Rudyard Kipling	The Jungle Book: Search for the Lost Treasure (1998)
The Jungle Book (1894–1895), Rudyard Kipling	The Jungle Book 2 (2003)
The Jungle Book (1894–1895), Rudyard Kipling	Jungle Book: Rikki-Tikki-Tavi to the Rescue (2006)
The Jungle Book (1894–1895), Rudyard Kipling	The Jungle Book (2016) (Note: Remake of the Disney film.)
The Jungle Book (1894–1895), Rudyard Kipling	Mowgli: Legend of the Jungle (2018)
Jungle Girl (1932), Edgar Rice Burroughs	Jungle Girl (1941)
Jungle Girl (1932), Edgar Rice Burroughs	Perils of Nyoka (1942)
Jupiter Laughs (1940), A. J. Cronin	Shining Victory (1941); I Seek You (German: Ich suche Dich) (1956)
Jurassic Park (1990), Michael Crichton	Jurassic Park (1993)
Jurassic Park (1990), Michael Crichton	The Lost World: Jurassic Park (1997) (Note: Sequel film; adapted from the sequel novel The Lost World (1995) by the same author.)
Jurassic Park (1990), Michael Crichton	Jurassic Park III (2001)
Jurassic Park (1990), Michael Crichton	Jurassic World (2015)
Jurassic Park (1990), Michael Crichton	Jurassic World: Fallen Kingdom (2018)
Jurassic Park (1990), Michael Crichton	Jurassic World Dominion (2022)
Jurassic Park (1990), Michael Crichton	Jurassic World Rebirth (2025)
Justine (1957), Lawrence Durrell	Justine (1969)

== See also ==
- Lists of works of fiction made into feature films
  - List of fiction works made into feature films (0–9, A–C)
  - List of fiction works made into feature films (K–R)
  - List of fiction works made into feature films (S–Z)
- Lists of literature made into feature films
  - List of short fiction made into feature films
  - List of children's books made into feature films
  - List of non-fiction works made into feature films
  - List of comics and comic strips made into feature films
  - List of plays adapted into feature films (disambiguation)
