= David Gregory (author) =

American author of Christian fiction

David Gregory is an American author of Christian fiction. David is a native of Texas.

== Selected works ==
=== Fiction ===
- Dinner with a Perfect Stranger: An Invitation Worth Considering WaterBrook Press, 2005.
- Day with a Perfect Stranger WaterBrook Press, 2006.
- The Next Level: a Parable of Finding Your Place in Life WaterBrook Press, 2008.
- The Last Christian WaterBrook Press, 2010
- Night with a Perfect Stranger, Worthy Publishing, March 2012 ISBN 9781936034864

=== Non-fiction ===
- The Marvelous Exchange
- The Rest of the Gospel: When the Partial Gospel Has Worn You Out (coauthored with Dan Stone)

== Adaptations ==
Two of his works were adapted to film. Dinner with a Perfect Stranger was the inspiration for The Perfect Stranger, a film directed by Shane Shooter and Jefferson Moore. His novel, Day with a Perfect Stranger which was a sequel to Dinner with a Perfect Stranger was the inspiration for the film Another Perfect Stranger, also directed by Shooter and Moore. Another sequel followed, The Perfect Gift, although it was not based on a book.
