= Nikki and the Perfect Stranger =

- Film poster
- Directed by: Jefferson Moore
- Written by: Jefferson Moore
- Produced by: Jefferson Moore; Kelly Worthington
- Starring: Jefferson Moore; Juliana Allen; Matt Wallace
- Cinematography: Kevin Crisp
- Edited by: Pate Walters
- Music by: Murphy Slone
- Production company: Kelly's Filmworks
- Distributed by: Kelly's Filmworks LTD
- Release date: October 5, 2013
- Country: United States
- Language: English

Nikki and the Perfect Stranger (also known as Perfect Stranger 3: The Reunion) is a 2013 sequel to the 2005 independent film, The Perfect Stranger, and its first sequel, Another Perfect Stranger. It stars Jefferson Moore, Matt Wallace (reprising his role as Tony Vincent from The Perfect Gift), and Juliana Allen as Nikki Cominsky (replacing Pamela Brumley who played Nikki in the first movie).

== Plot ==
The third and final chapter in the 'Perfect Stranger' movie series, features the return of Nikki Cominskey, now in her forties and no longer a high-powered attorney, who has done everything she knows to grow spiritually, and wonders where her closeness with Jesus has gone. Burned out and hopeless, she wails her complaints to God during a late-night interstate trip. Running out of fuel, she finds Jesus once again....along the roadside with a can of gas. The Wonderful Counselor hops in and offers answers she never heard in a church and a nighttime of adventure ensues beyond anything Nikki could have ever imagined.
