= The Diamond Hunters =

1971 novel by Wilbur Smith

- cover of Heinemann 1971 first edition
- Author: Wilbur Smith
- Language: English
- Publisher: Heinemann
- Publication date: 1971
- Publication place: South Africa
- ISBN: 0434714054

The Diamond Hunters is a 1971 novel by Wilbur Smith.

== Adaptation ==
Smith tried to get it made into a film for a number of years. It was adapted into the 1975 film The Kingfisher Caper and a 2001 television mini series.
