= The Kingfisher Caper =

- Movie poster
- Directed by: Dirk DeVilliers
- Written by: Roy Boulting; Lee Marcus
- Based on: the novel The Diamond Hunters by Wilbur Smith (uncredited)
- Produced by: Ben Vlok
- Starring: Hayley Mills; David McCallum; Jon Cypher; Bill McNaught
- Cinematography: Ivo Pellegrini
- Edited by: Kenneth Connor
- Music by: John Dankworth
- Distributed by: Cinema Shares International Distribution Corporation (USA)
- Release dates: June 30, 1975 (South Africa); July 1976 (USA)
- Running time: 86 minutes
- Country: South Africa
- Language: English

The Kingfisher Caper (released as Diamond Hunters in South Africa and as Diamond Lust on video) is a 1975 South African film directed by Dirk DeVilliers for Kavalier Films Ltd. It stars Hayley Mills (as Tracey van der Byl), David McCallum (Benedict van der Byl), Jon Cypher (Johnny Lance), Volente Bertotti (Ruby Lance), Barry Trengove (Cappy) and Bill McNaught (Hendrich van der Byl).

== Cast ==
=== Main cast ===
- Hayley Mills as Tracey Van Der Byl
- David McCallum as Benedict Van Der Byl
- Jon Cypher as Johnny Lance
- Barry Trengove as Cappy
- Volenté Bertotti as Ruby Lance
- Bill McNaught as Hendrich Van Der Byl
- Don Furnival as Mac
- Gordon van Rooyen as Kramer
- Stanley Leeshaw as Osaki
- Pieter Geldenhuys as Attorney
- Ray Novak as Joe
- Ian Botha as Sampson

=== Supporting cast ===
- Dirk de Villiers as Les (uncredited)

== Production ==
Film rights were bought by Philip Vrasne, who wanted to make it in South Africa.

Kingfisher Caper writer Roy Boulting was married to star Hayley Mills at the time of the filming. This was his final writing credit.

Filmink magazine called it "typical of several South African movies from the 1970s that attempted to crack the international market (The Shangani Patrol, Funeral for an Assassin, Killer Force, Target of an Assassin, Golden Rendezvous, Game for Vultures): a half-baked action piece with B-list stars (Hayley Mills, David McCallum), iffy handling and one or two decent moments. Roy Boulting, married to Mills at the time, gets a script credit, his last; the film helped kill her career as a movie star."

== Remake ==
It was remade as the 2001 miniseries The Diamond Hunters with Alyssa Milano, Roy Scheider, Sean Patrick Flanery and Michael Easton in the Mills, McNaught, Cypher and McCallum roles respectively; Jolene Blalock, Armin Rohde and Hannes Jaenicke also featured.
