= Jefferson Moore =

American actor

- Occupations: Actor; producer; writer; editor
- Spouse: Kelly Worthington

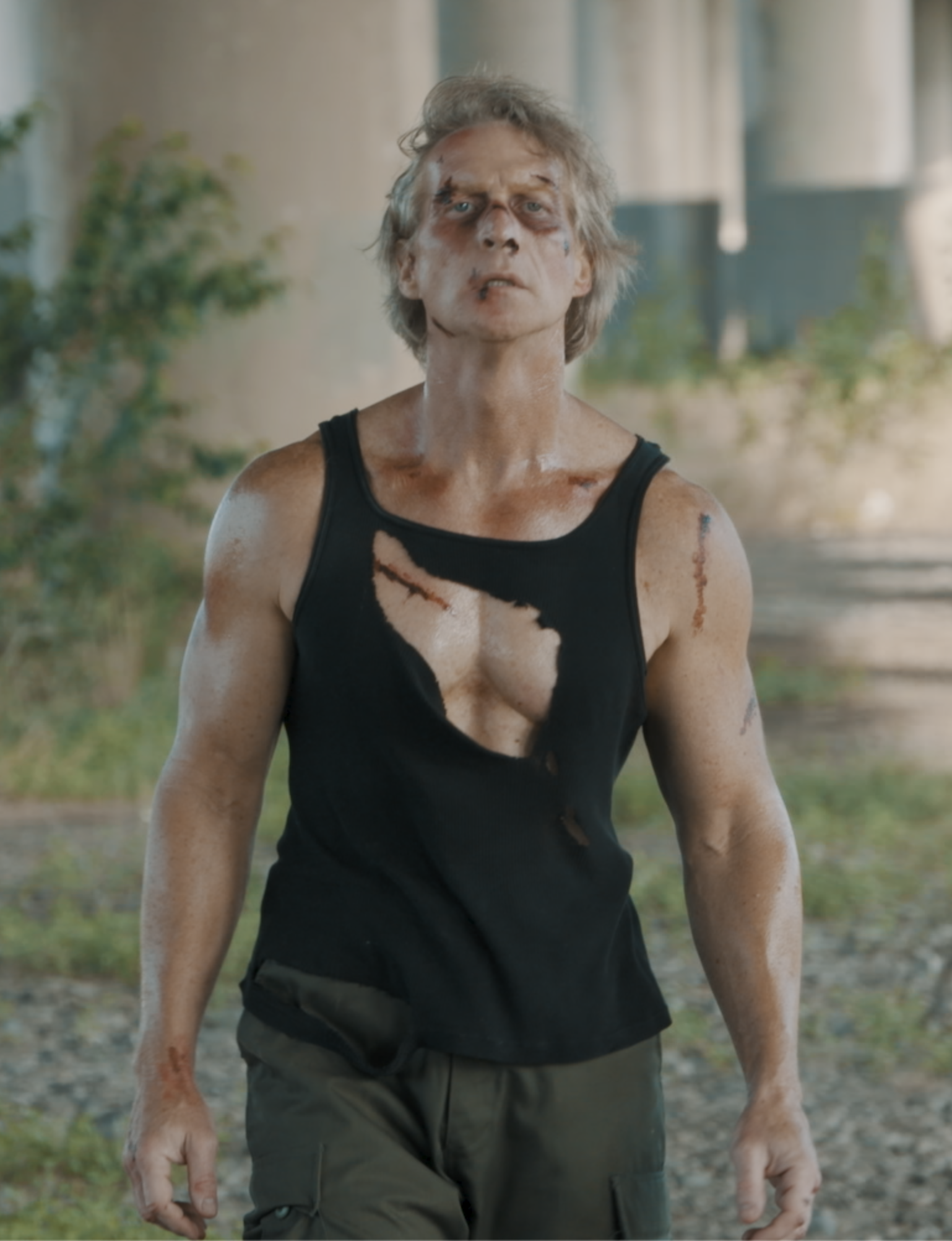

Jefferson Moore is an American actor, writer, producer, director and editor based in Fairhope, Alabama. He is the founder and owner of Kelly's Filmworks Studios.

== Background ==
Jefferson attended The University of Kentucky and Western Kentucky University and began working in sales. He met his wife Kelly while attending WKU. He began his acting career by accident. He attended an audition at a regional theater with his wife, who was auditioning. The director asked him to read the lead lines as the person who was supposed to didn't show up, and he wound up with the part. Afterwards, he continued doing stage work and later moved into on-camera roles in music videos, television commercials, and short films; after nine years, he landed his first principal role in a feature film opposite Lou Diamond Phillips and Andre Braugher.

In 2001, he founded Kelly's Filmworks Ltd. (named for his wife and co-founder, Kelly) and proceeded to write, produce, direct and edit his own projects. The company also handles its own distribution. Incidentally, each movie has a character named Kelly somewhere in the film.

He has stated in numerous interviews that his company does not produce "Christian films", explaining, "we are an independent movie studio whose stories are produced by persons who are faithful to the Hope of Jesus Christ, and, naturally, those world views are sometimes reflected, in a myriad of ways, in our productions."

Jefferson has served as editor on several of his films, under the pseudonym Pate Walters.

Beginning in late 2022, he began guesting-hosting on WABF1480 in Fairhope, Alabama as "Jefferson in the Morning".

== Filmography ==
- "Feed Jake" - 1992 Music video - actor
- Funny Business – 1992 TV series – actor
- Volunteers – 1993 TV pilot – actor
- Brotherly Love – 2000 TV movie – actor
- A Better Way to Die – 2000 – actor
- Out of the Black – 2001 – actor
- Out of the Black – 2001 – stunts
- Artworks – 2003 – actor
- Turning the Corner – 2004 – actor
- La Sposa – 2004 – actor, writer, director
- Oldham County – 2004 – actor
- The Perfect Stranger – 2005 – actor, producer, writer, editor, director
- Another Perfect Stranger – 2007 – actor, producer, writer, director
- The Stranger (TV series) – 2007 – actor, producer, writer, director
- Clancy – 2009 – actor, producer, writer, director
- The Perfect Gift – 2009 – actor, producer, writer, director
- 1 Message – 2011 – actor, producer, writer, director
- Pieces of Easter – 2013 – actor, producer, writer, director
- Nikki and the Perfect Stranger – 2013 – actor, producer, writer, director
- Reading Kate – 2015 – actor, producer, writer, director
- Clancy Once Again – 2017 – actor, producer, writer, director
- Smoketown (TV miniseries) – 2018 – actor
- National Anthem Girl (documentary) – 2019 – producer, writer, director
- OVW Wrestling – 2022 (TV series) – performer
- Into the Wild Frontier (TV series) – 2023 – actor (S3, ep3 - as John Bartram)
- Meeting Kate – 2023 – actor, producer, writer, director
- The Longest Running Traditional Irish Session on the Alabama Gulf Coast (documentary) – 2024 – director, writer, producer
- Saltwater Gospel – 2025 – actor, producer, writer, director
