= Rock N Roll Frankenstein =

Rock 'N Roll Frankenstein is a 1999 American horror comedy film that was directed by Brian O'Hara. The film had its world premiere on 18 September 1999 at the Helsinki International Film Festival and stars Graig Guggenheim, Jayson Spence, Barry Feterman and Hiram Jacob Segarra.

In the film, a record producer decides to create a rock star out of the remains of deceased rock musicians. A new Frankenstein's monster is created out of the remains of Jimi Hendrix, Buddy Holly, Elvis Presley, and Sid Vicious.

== Plot ==
The film follows Bernie, a record producer who persuades his nephew Frankie to create a new rock star that will help Bernie overcome his work-related ennui. Iggy, the burnt-out roadie pillages the graves of various celebrities, such as Buddy Holly, Jimi Hendrix, and Sid Vicious, using the head of Elvis Presley to top things off. Bernie orders Iggy to steal a rather crucial part of Jim Morrison, but things go awry and a part of Liberace is substituted instead. The King finds he has a usual interest in gerbils...

== Cast ==
- Barry Feterman as Bernie Stein
- Hiram Jacob Segarra as Iggy
- Andrew Hurley as Curly
- Ted Travelstead as Pete
- Graig Guggenheim as The Monster, a.k.a. 'King'
- Jayson Spence as Frankie Stein

== Reception ==
The film has a rating of 60% on Rotten Tomatoes, based on five reviews, with an average rating of 6.1/10.

=== Awards ===
- Best Gratuitous Use of Violence Award at the Melbourne Underground Film Festival (2001, won)
