= The Perfect Stranger (film) =

- Directed by: Jefferson Moore; Shane Sooter
- Written by: David Gregory (novel); Jefferson Moore (screenplay)
- Starring: Pamela Brumley; Jefferson Moore; Tom Luce
- Cinematography: Kevin Bryan
- Edited by: Pate Walters
- Music by: Mark Noderer; Brian Sites
- Production company: Kelly's Filmworks
- Distributed by: Kelly's Filmworks LTD
- Release date: October 28, 2005
- Country: United States
- Language: English
- Box office: $4,500,000

The Perfect Stranger is a 2005 independent film based on the novel Dinner with a Perfect Stranger by David Gregory. It was featured at the 2005 Western Film and Video Festival, and was released on October 28, 2005. Directed by Jefferson Moore and Shane Sooter, the film starred Pamela Brumley and Jefferson Moore.

== Plot ==
Nikki Cominsky (Pamela Brumley) is a lawyer with problems in her married life. She moved from Cincinnati, Ohio and is working for a large law firm in the Chicago area. She invites her husband to have a romantic dinner at a local restaurant, but he has already made plans to go to a baseball game. Disappointed, she goes to work and sees an invitation for dinner at the very same restaurant that she was planning on going to with her husband.

At first Nikki is irked because she is sick of the local churches' attempts at getting new followers, but quickly realizes that this may be a romantic attempt from her husband. Excited, she goes to the restaurant, but sees a mysterious man claiming to be Jesus Christ (Jefferson Moore). She thinks the man is crazy and attempts to leave, but the man persuades her to stay by telling her that after dinner he would tell her who sent him. Knowing that she would want to find out who is responsible, and not wanting to refuse a free dinner, she stays. The man begins to use real life examples such as family and other religions to tie in why Christianity is the one true religion, also as to why he really is, in fact, Jesus.

Throughout their evening of conversation, arguments and debate, Nikki learns things she never knew about life, Heaven, Hell, other religions, the universe, and even herself. By the time dinner is over, she notices large spike scars on the man's wrists, and her life has been changed forever. He says that she was the one who sent for him, years before. When Nikki gets home, she finds her husband there, and Sarah (her daughter) in bed, as was foretold by the stranger.

== Cast ==
- Pamela Brumley as Nikki Cominsky
- Jefferson Moore as The Stranger
- Tom Luce as Eduardo
- Dennis Martin as Matt Cominsky
- Stella Davis as Sarah Cominsky

== Production ==
The film was shot on location in Louisville, Kentucky and neighboring Jeffersonville, Indiana.

== Sequels and spinoffs ==
The movie is followed by two sequels: Another Perfect Stranger (2007) and Nikki and the Perfect Stranger (2013) and a spinoff movie The Perfect Gift (2009).
