= The Perfect Gift =

- Directed by: Jefferson Moore
- Written by: Jefferson Moore (screenplay and story)
- Produced by: Jefferson Moore; Kelly Worthington Moore
- Starring: Jefferson Moore; Christina Fougnie; Amy Hess; Matt Wallace
- Cinematography: Tim Antkowiak; Gary Leo Miller
- Edited by: Pate Walters
- Music by: BJ Davis
- Production company: Kelly's Filmworks
- Distributed by: Kelly's Filmworks LTD
- Release date: November 1, 2009
- Country: United States
- Language: English

The Perfect Gift is a 2009 independent holiday film. It stars Christina Fougnie, Amy Hess, Matt Wallace and Jefferson Moore. It was filmed almost entirely in the state of Kentucky.

The movie is a spinoff of The Perfect Stranger series.

== Plot ==
Maxine Noelle Westray (Christina Fougnie) is a typical schoolgirl, yet she is incredibly spoiled and bratty. Born on Christmas, she only sees that day as a time for lavish and expensive gifts. Her overworked executive mother (Amy Hess) is struggling to provide a "suitable" holiday environment for her co-workers. A disillusioned young minister Tony Vincent (Matt Wallace) does not see Christmas as a minister should. Then one day a drifter (Jefferson Moore) comes into town and changes these three people's lives forever by teaching them the true meaning of Christmas and that the best gift of all doesn't come in wrapping.
