= Thingangyun District =

District in Yangon, Myanmar

Thingangyun District သင်္ဃန်းကျွန်းခရိုင်
- District
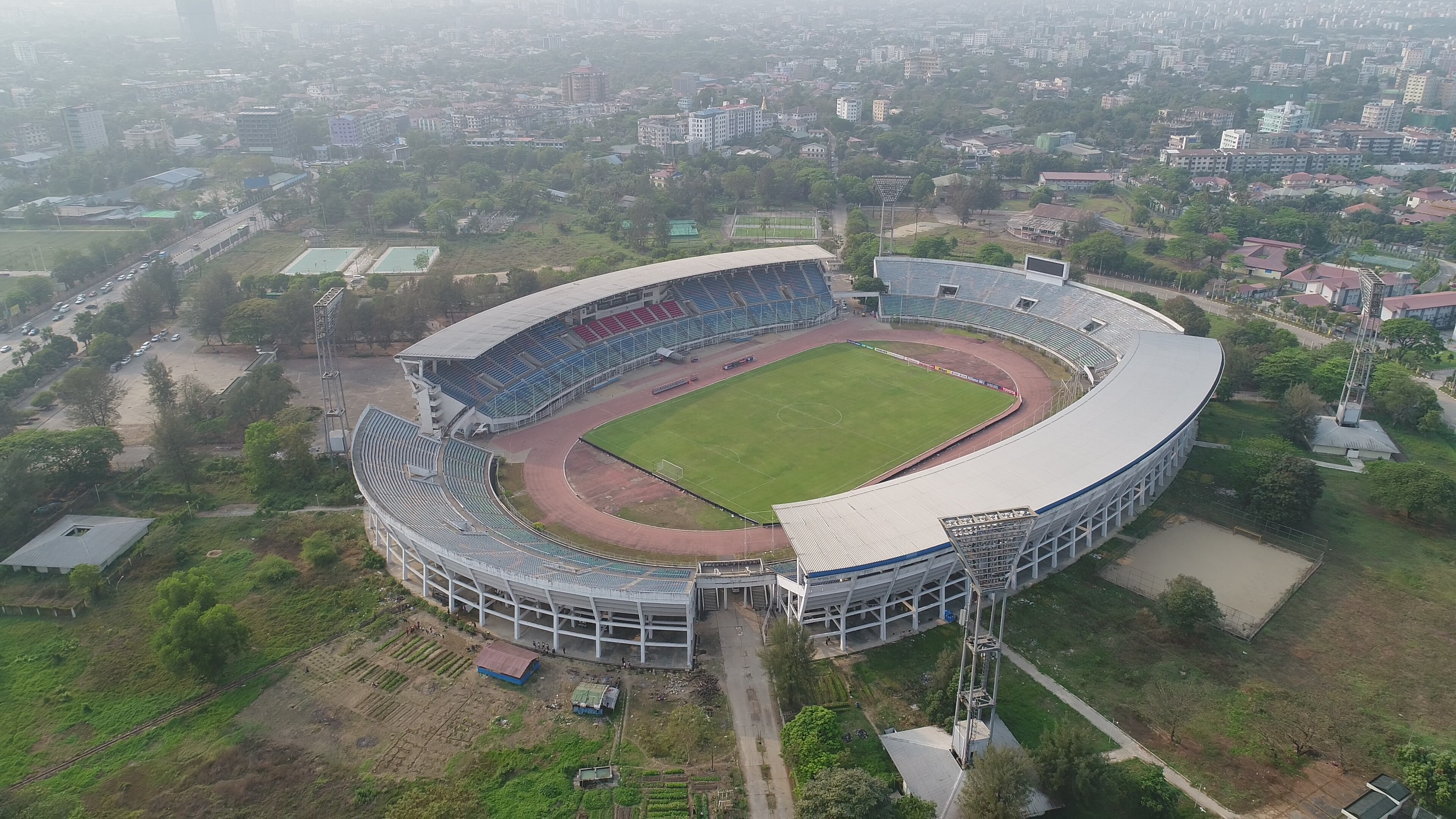
- Aerial view of Thuwunna Stadium

- Thingangyun District in Yangon Region
- Coordinates: 16.824°N 96.182°E
- Country: Myanmar
- Region: Yangon Region
- City: Yangon

Government
  - Chairman: Htoo Lwin
- Area code: +951

Thingangyun District (Burmese: သင်္ဃန်းကျွန်းခရိုင်) is a district in Yangon Region, Myanmar. It is a township of Yangon and contains four townships. The district was created in 2022, being one of the new districts created from the former East Yangon District.

== Administration ==
The district has four townships- South Okkalapa Township, Tamwe Township, Thingangyun Township and Yankin Township. The Thingangyun Township Court was upgraded to a district-level court. The district has an Administrative Committee chaired by U Htoo Lwin.

== Notable Sites ==
The district is home to Thingangyun Education College and University of Dental Medicine, Yangon The Yankin Children's Hospital and the South Okkalapa Women's and Children's Hospital are also major pieces of health infrastructure for the district and city at large. The Yangon Workers' Hospital, one of the city's three Social Security Board-funded free hospitals is located in Tamwe.

The city's main sporting venues, the Thuwunna Stadium and the Thuwunna Indoor Stadium are located on the western side of the Thingangyun Township, near the centre of the district.

Yankin is a thriving commercial hub, with the popular shopping destination Yankin Centre in the township. Public facilities like the Kokkine Swimming Pools, the Myakyuntha Amusement Park on the eastern bank of Inya Lake and the National Library of Myanmar are in Yankin. Tamwe Township was first settled in medieval times, dating back to the Hanthawaddy kingdom and deriving its name from the Mon people of that time.

== See also ==
- List of districts and neighborhoods of Yangon
