= Thit Thit Myint =

Burmese politician (born 1957)

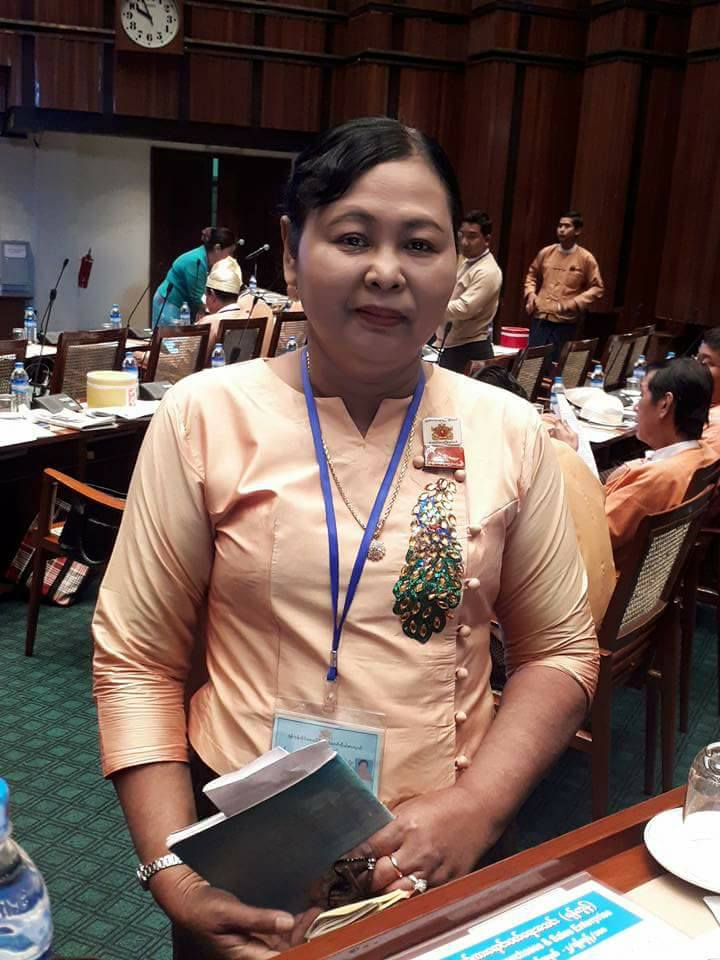
- Thit ThitMyint (Yangon Region Hluttaw representative)

Member of the Yangon Region Hluttaw
- Incumbent
- Assumed office 3 February 2016
- Constituency: South Okkalapa Township № 1
- Majority: 32,102 votes

Personal details
- Born: 14 June 1957 (age 69) Yangon, Myanmar
- Party: National League for Democracy
- Parent(s): Thakhin Soe Myint (father); Aye Kywe (mother)
- Education: Yangon University

Thit Thit Myint (Burmese: သစ်သစ်မြင့်, born 14 June 1957) is a Burmese politician who currently serves as a member of parliament in the Yangon Region Hluttaw for South Okkalapa Township No. 1 Constituency. She is a member of the National League for Democracy.

== Early life and education ==
Thit was born on 14 June 1957 in Yangon, Myanmar to parents Soe Myint who is a member of the Pyithu Hluttaw (House of Representatives), which won in the 1990 Myanmar general election in South Okkalapa Township and Aye Kywe. She graduated B.A(Psy) from Yangon University.

== Political career ==
In the 2015 Myanmar general election, she contested the Yangon Region Hluttaw from South Okkalapa Township No. 1 parliamentary constituency, winning a majority of 32,102 votes.
