= Charitraheen (disambiguation) =

Charitaheen or Choritrohin (lit. 'characterless') may refer to:

- Choritrohin, a Bengali-language novel by Indian author Sarat Chandra Chattopadhyay
  - Charitraheen, 1974 Bollywood film based on Choritrohin
  - Charitraheen (film), 1975 Bangladeshi film based on Choritrohin
- Charitraheen (web series), 2018 Indian Bengali-language television series
