= Sarat Chandra Chattopadhyay =

Indian Bengali writer (1876–1938)

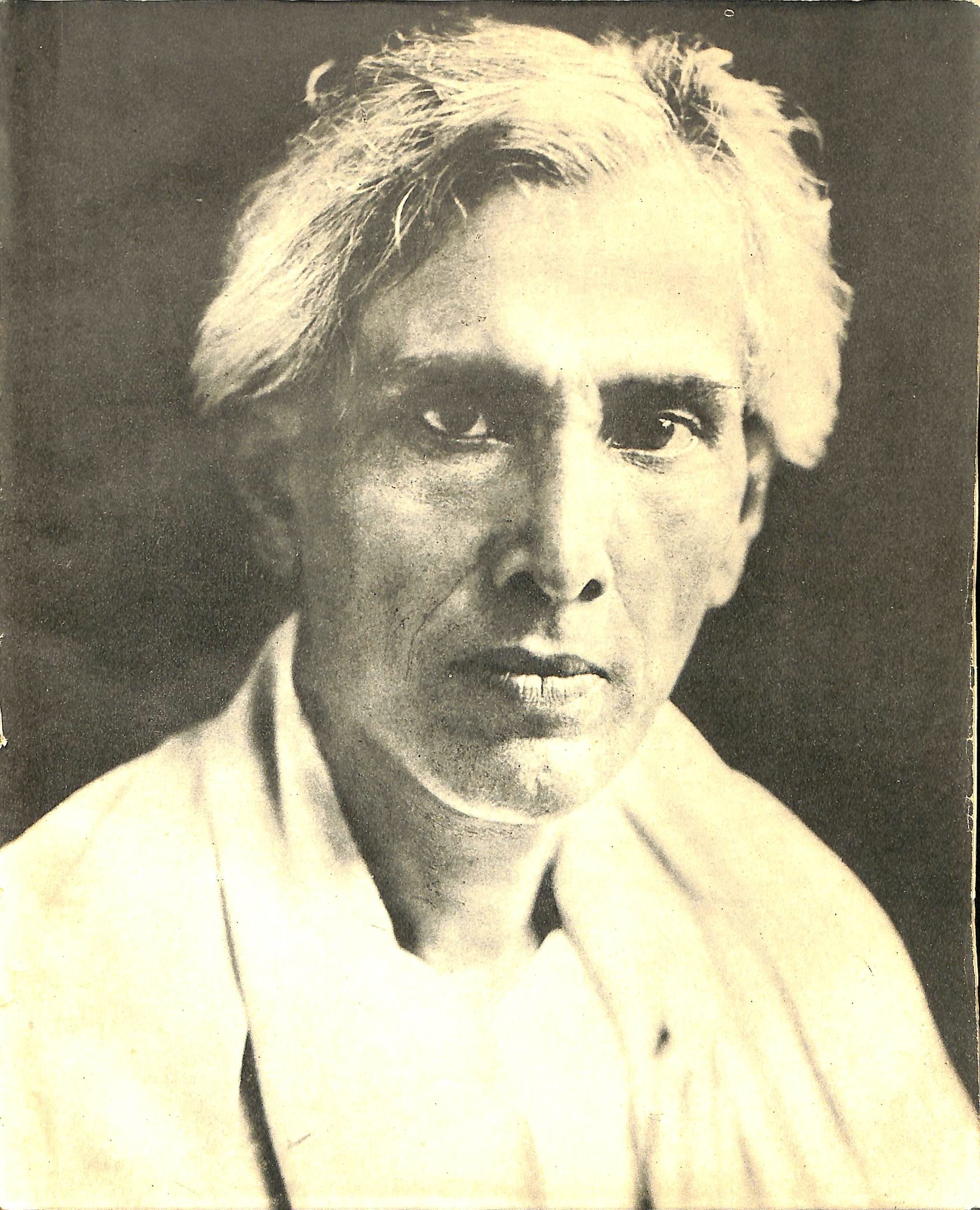
- Pronunciation: [ʃɔɾot̪t͡ʃɔnd̪ɾo t͡ʃɔʈːopad̪ʱːae̯]
- Born: 15 September 1876; Debanandapur, Bengal, British India
- Died: 16 January 1938 (aged 61); Calcutta, Bengal Presidency, British India
- Occupations: Writer, novelist
- Spouse(s): Shanti Devi (m. 1906–1908); Hironmoyi Devi (m. 1910–1938)
- Writing career
- Language: Bengali
- Period: 19th century – 20th century
- Notable works: Srikanta; Choritrohin; Devdas; Parineeta; Pather Dabi
- Notable awards: Jagattarini Award (by the Calcutta University); Doctor of Literature, Honoris Causa (by the University of Dhaka)
- Movement: Bengali Renaissance

Sarat Chandra Chattopadhyay (Note: Bengali pronunciation: [ʃɔɾot̪t͡ʃɔnd̪ɾo t͡ʃɔʈːopad̪ʱːae̯]; anglicised as Sarat Chandra Chatterjee.) (Bengali pronunciation: [ʃɔɾot̪t͡ʃɔnd̪ɾo t͡ʃɔʈːopad̪ʱːae̯]; 15 September 1876 – 16 January 1938) was a Bengali novelist and short story writer of the early 20th century. Regarded as one of the greatest writers of India, he profusely brought out the lives of Bengali family and society in cities and villages. However, his keen powers of observation, great sympathy for fellow human beings, a deep understanding of human psychology (including the "ways and thoughts and languages of women and children"), an easy and natural writing style, and freedom from political biases and social prejudices enable his writing to transcend barriers and appeal to all Indians. He remains the most popular, translated, and adapted Indian author of all time.

== Early life ==
Sarat Chandra Chattopadhyay was born on 15 September 1876, in a Bengali Brahmin family in Debanandapur, a small village in Hooghly, West Bengal, about 50 kilometres from Kolkata. He was his father Matilal and mother Bhubanmohini's eldest son and second child. His grandfather was Baikuntha Chattopadhyay; after Baikuntha was murdered by his zamindar, Sarat Chandra's grandmother moved to Debanandapur with Matilal. Matilal was given a piece of land by his mother's brothers. Some time later, he married Bhubanmohini, the daughter of Kedarnath Gangopadhyay, who lived in Bhagalpur, Bihar. Matilal continued his studies in Bhagalpur, but his financial situation was precarious as he could not hold on to any jobs.

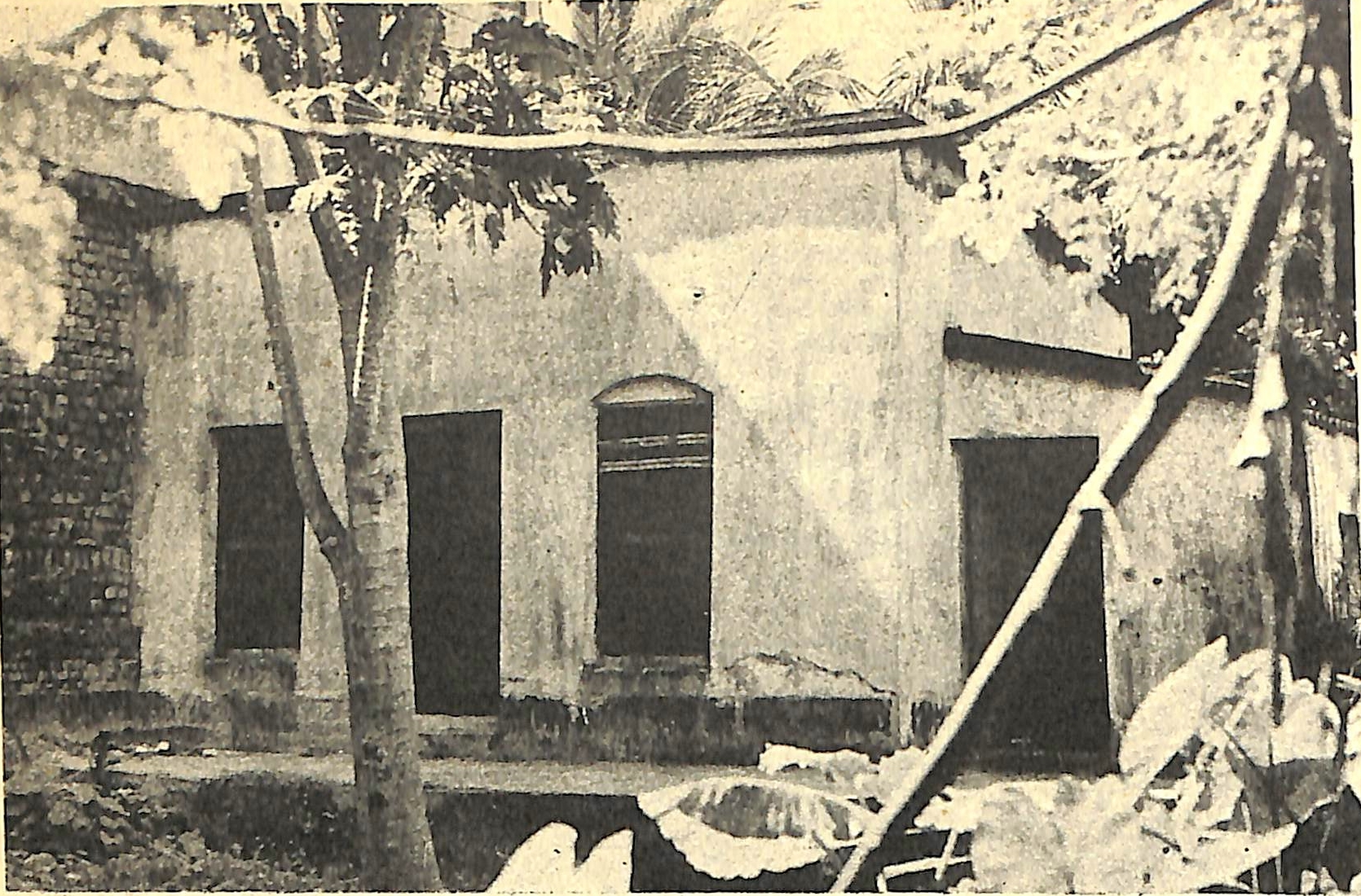
Birthplace of Sarat Chandra in Debanandapur, Hooghly

Sarat Chandra Chattopadhyay started working from an early age. Chattopadhyay took an interest in literature from Motilal. Much of Chattopadhyay's early life is disputed. According to Narasingha Prosad Sil, Chattopadhyay was taken to Bhagalpur from Debanandapur when he was two or three years old. He enrolled there in school and stayed till fifth or sixth year. Chattopadhyay came back to Debanandapur, where he studied in a pathashala for two years. In the rural areas, he often went fishing or rafting in water bodies and exploring places.

In 1886, Chattopadhyay went to travel in Dehri-on-Sone. After this travel, Matilal sent him to Durgacharan Middle English School in Bhagalpur for a getting a scholarship. For meeting the eligibility, he took tutoring lessons from his classmate Manindranath's tutor. They passed their exams and got scholarship. The next year, Chattopadhyay enrolled in the Bhagalpur District School where he studied till 1889.

In 1889, Matilal lost his job. Chattopadhyay and his whole family shifted into Debanandapur, where he enrolled into the Hooghly District School. His father arranged a room for Sarat Chandra to stay, at the house of a landlord. He stayed in the residence for a few years and returned to Debanandapur. Matilal was unable to further pay for Chattopadhyay's education than what he paid earlier. They traveled to Bhagalpur in 1893 and Chattopadhyay got enrolled in Tejnarayan Jubilee Collegiate School. A teacher in the school helped Chattopadhyay to complete his homework to encourage his studies. Kedarnath died in 1892. His death caused turmoil in the family. His son Thakurdas Gangopadhyay spent money on lawyers for a financial lawsuit. To pay for Chattopadhyay's education, Kedarnath's son Bipradas borrowed money. Chattopadhyay completed his entrance exams in 1894. Sarat Chandra Chatterjee being unable to pay for college education was approached by the mother of his classmate's tutor, Kusumkamini, who offered to pay Chattopadhyay's college fees for tutoring her two sons. During his college years, Chattopadhyay began writing books; he took his inspiration from the novels of Bankim Chandra Chattopadhyay and from his enduring interest in narrating stories and the theaters.

Sarat Chandra was a daring, adventure-loving boy. He attended schools in and around Debanandapur, one being Hooghly Branch Government School and in Bhagalpur. His strong performance in English and other subjects was rewarded with a "double promotion" that enabled him to skip a grade. However, in 1892, financial difficulties forced him to stay out of school for one year. He began writing stories at the time.

Matilal sold his paternal house on November 9, 1896, to Kedarnath's brother Aghornath. After November 1896, Matilal rented a house owned by Chandrashekhar Sarkar, in the slums of Bhagalpur. Chattopadhyay studied in college using borrowed books from his classmate he met in primary school. Chattopadhyay did not have enough money (₹20) to pay for the final college exams, after studying there for two years, he ended his formal education.

Poverty forced the family to live for long periods in Bhuvanmohini's father's (and later brother's) home in Bhagalpur, Bihar.

In 1894, Sarat Chandra passed his Entrance Examination (public examination at the end of Class X) and entered Tejnarayan Jubilee College. He developed an interest in English literature and read A Tale of Two Cities and David Copperfield by Charles Dickens and other novels. Looking at Western authors such as Marie Corelli and Ellen Prince, Chatterjee adopted the pseudonym St. C. Lara. He was inspired by the writings of Bankim Chandra Chattopadhyay. He organized a children's literary society in Bhagalpur, which published a handwritten magazine. Two years later, his formal studies ended as he could not pay the twenty rupees examination fee.

On his wife's death in 1895, Matilal left the house of his in-laws and moved the family to a mud house in Bhagalpur. In 1896, he sold his ancestral house to repay debts. Sarat Chandra spent time interacting with friends, acting in plays, and playing sports and games. He seriously read literature and wrote several famous works including Bordidi, Chandranath, and Devdas. And then he stopped writing: "But I soon gave up the habit as useless, and almost forgot in the long years that followed that I could even write a sentence in my boyhood."

After holding sundry jobs, Sarat Chandra got upset with his father and left home. He wandered from place to place in the guise of a sannyasi (monk). Little is known about what he did during this period. On getting the news of his father's death, Sarat Chandra came back and did his father's shraddha (memorial service). His oldest sister was already married. He deposited his remaining siblings with a friend and relatives and went to Calcutta (today's Kolkata) to try out his luck.

In Calcutta, Sarat Chandra worked for six months translating Hindi paper books into English for an advocate. In January 1903, he went to Burma (today's Myanmar).

Before leaving for Burma, at the insistence of an uncle, Sarat Chandra sent the story "Mandir" to the "Kuntaleen Story Competition." It won the first prize out of 150 submissions. Mandir was published under another uncle's name. The story was 27-year-old Sarat Chandra's first printed work.

== Life in Burma ==
Sarat Chandra lived in Burma for thirteen years. He first held sundry jobs in Rangoon and Pegu (today's Yangon and Bago, respectively). He eventually found work in Burma Public Works Accounts Office in Rangoon.

Most of his stay in Rangoon was in the Botahtaung Pazundaung neighbourhood where "mistris" (manual workers, mechanics, craftsmen, artisans) lived. He freely mixed with them. He wrote their job applications, mediated conflicts, gave them homeopathic medicine for free, even gave monetary help. The mistris had great respect for him.

During his stay in Rangoon, Sarat Chandra read widely. He borrowed books on various subjects, including sociology, politics, philosophy, physiology, psychology, history, scriptures, and other topics from the Bernard Free Library. Signs of heart problems slightly slowed down his intense study habits. He also began to paint.

In 1912, the wooden house where he lived on Lansdowne Road got burnt down. He lost his belongings including his paintings, and the manuscript of his novel Choritrohin, which he rewrote.

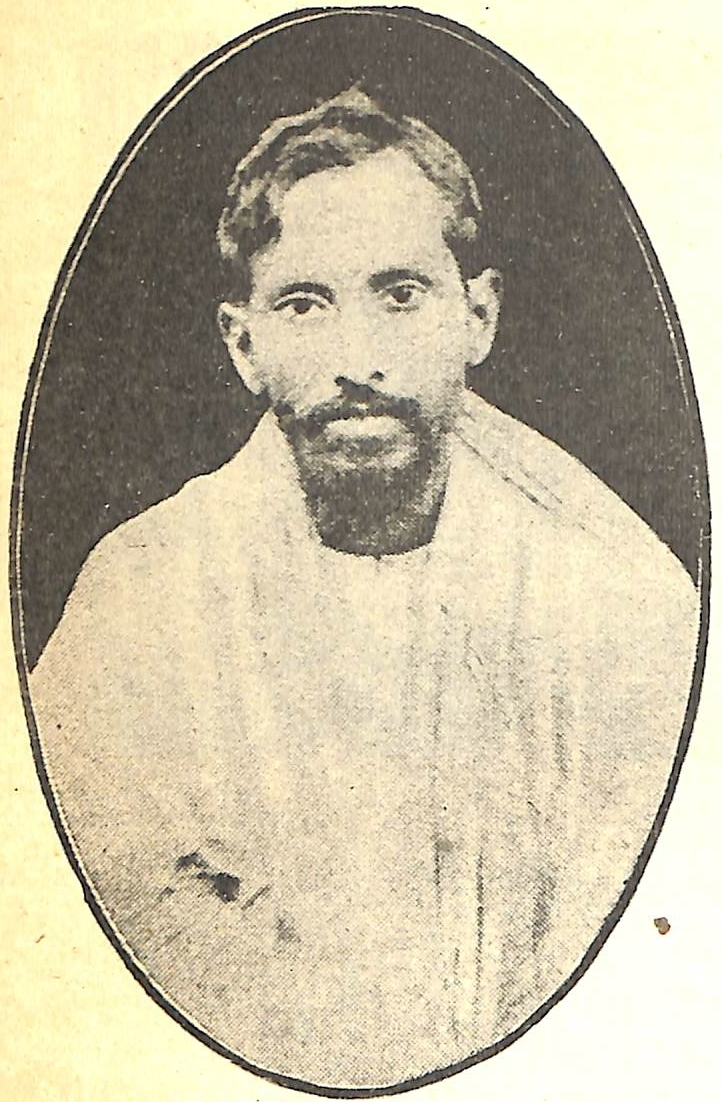
Sarat Chandra Chattopadhyay in 1914

He resumed writing after a gap of many years: "Some of my old acquaintances started a little magazine, but no one of note would condescend to contribute to it, as it was so small and insignificant. When almost hopeless, some of them suddenly remembered me, and after much persuasion they succeeded in extracting from me a promise to write for it. This was in the year 1913. I agreed most unwillingly—perhaps only to put them off until I returned to Rangoon and could forget the matter entirely. But sheer volume and force of their letters and telegrams compelled me at last to think seriously about writing again. I sent them a short story, for their magazine Jamuna. This became at once extremely popular, and made me famous in one day. Since then I have been writing regularly. In Bengal perhaps I am the only fortunate writer who has not had to struggle."

In 1916, he resigned from his job due to ill health and moved to Calcutta.

== Later life ==
In 1916, a forty-year-old Sarat Chandra Chattopadhyay moved to Howrah, the twin city of Calcutta. He became a full-time writer.

His stories and serialized novels were published in magazines such as Jamuna, Bharatvarsha, and Narayan. Later, his novels and story collections would get published as books. He either got nothing or took nothing from the publisher for his first novel, Bardidi (appeared as a serial in Bharati magazine in 1907, and in the book form in 1913). He sold the rights to his second published novel, Biraj Bou, for two hundred rupees. His works became immensely popular. Royalties from his published works enabled him to escape lifelong poverty for the first time.

In 1918, the novel Biraj Bou was adapted for the stage and performed in the famous Star Theatre. James Drummond Anderson in 1918 wrote an article entitled "A New Bengali Writer" in the Times Literary Supplement, which introduced Sarat Chandra to the Western world.

In 1919, Chandrashekhar Pathak translated the novel Biraj Bou into Hindi. This was the first translation of Sarat Chandra's work in another Indian language. More of his works were translated in the following years into Marathi, Gujarati, and other Indian languages.

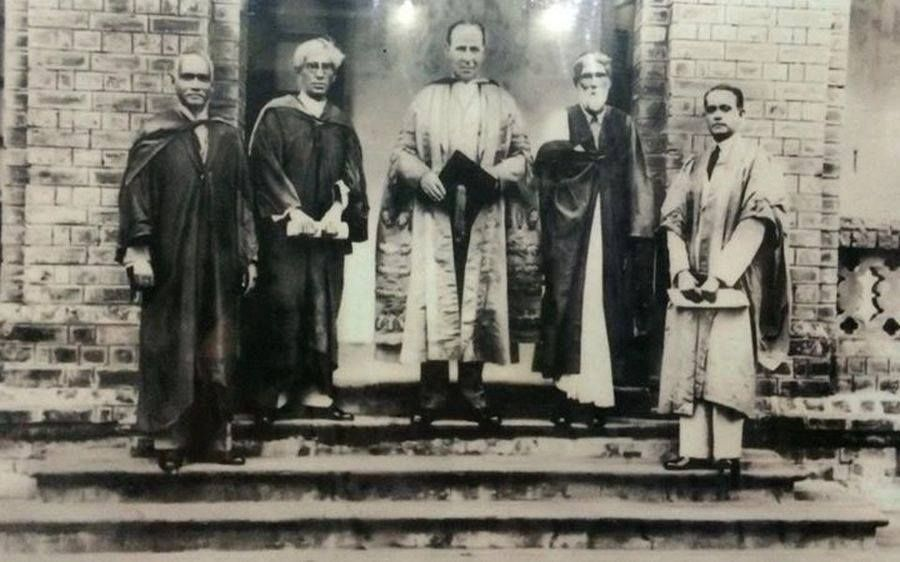
(From left) Historian Sir Jadunath Sarkar, Sarat Chandra Chattopadhyay, Governor of Bengal Sir John Anderson, chemist Sir Prafulla Chandra Roy, and Vice Chancellor historian Sir Ahmad Fazlur Rahman. The first four were recipients of honorary doctorates from the University of Dacca in 1936. Other recipients not pictured here are Sir Abdur Rahim, Sir Jagadish Chandra Bose, Sir Muhammad Iqbal, and Rabindranath Tagore.

The first English translation of Sarat Chandra's work, Srikanta (Volume I), was published by the Oxford University Press in 1922. The first film based on Sarat Chandra's writings, silent movie Andhare Aalo, was released the same year. It was an adaptation of Chatterjee's story by the same name.

Sarat Chandra was a strong supporter of the Indian freedom movement. He was the president of the Howrah District Congress Committee branch of the Indian National Congress from 1921 to 1936. He also gave cash and other support to Indian revolutionary freedom fighters. He was friends with Chittaranjan Das, Subhas Chandra Bose, and many other freedom fighters and political leaders. While most of his works avoided politics, his novel Pather Dabi (1926) heavily criticized the British Raj. The book was proscribed by the colonial British Government of India on 4 January 1927. The restriction (ban) was removed in 1939, 1 year after Sarat Chandra's death.

Great academic recognition came to Sarat Chandra, whose formal studies ended at Class XII. His works entered the school and college curricula. In 1923, the University of Calcutta awarded him the prestigious Jagattarini Gold Medal. He was a paper setter in Bengali in the B.A. examination at the university. In 1936, the University of Dacca awarded him a Doctor of Literature (honoris causa). Except for Sarat Chandra, all honourees had been recipients of knighthood. His novel Pather Dabi did not endear him to the colonial British government.

He built his own house, first in Samta in 1923, and his second house in Calcutta. He moved into his new Calcutta house in 1935. He planned to travel to Europe, but his health was failing. He was diagnosed with liver cancer. On 16 January 1938, he died in Park Nursing Home in South Calcutta.

== Personal life ==
Subhash. C. Sarker writes: "His father was an utterly restless person—more of a dreamer than a realist ... By contrast Sarat Chandar's [sic] mother, Bhubanmohini Devi, was a hardworking lady who braved all the adversities of life with a calm patience." Sarkar also writes "The mother (Bhubanmohini) had an unmistakable impact on the mental make-up of the son (Sarat) as could be seen from the dominance of the female characters in his literary creations. Practically all the leading ladies in Sarat Chandra's stories are self-sacrificing in one way or the other."

Sarat Chandra was the second of seven siblings, five of them lived to adulthood. The oldest was sister Anila Devi, who lived with her husband in Gobindapur village of Howrah district. Next to him was Prabhas Chandra. He joined the Ramakrishna Mission and became a sannyasi (monk). The youngest brother, Prakash Chandra, lived in Sarat Chandra's household with his family. The youngest sibling, sister Sushila Devi, was also married.

In Rangoon, Sarat Chandra's neighbour downstairs was a Bengali "mistri" (a blue-collar worker) who had arranged his daughter's marriage to an alcoholic. The daughter Shanti Chakrabarty begged him to rescue her. Sarat Chandra married her in 1906. One year later in 1907, he was devastated when his wife and one-year-old son died from plague in an epidemic. To make his mind away from the loss, he involved himself in studies of various subjects.

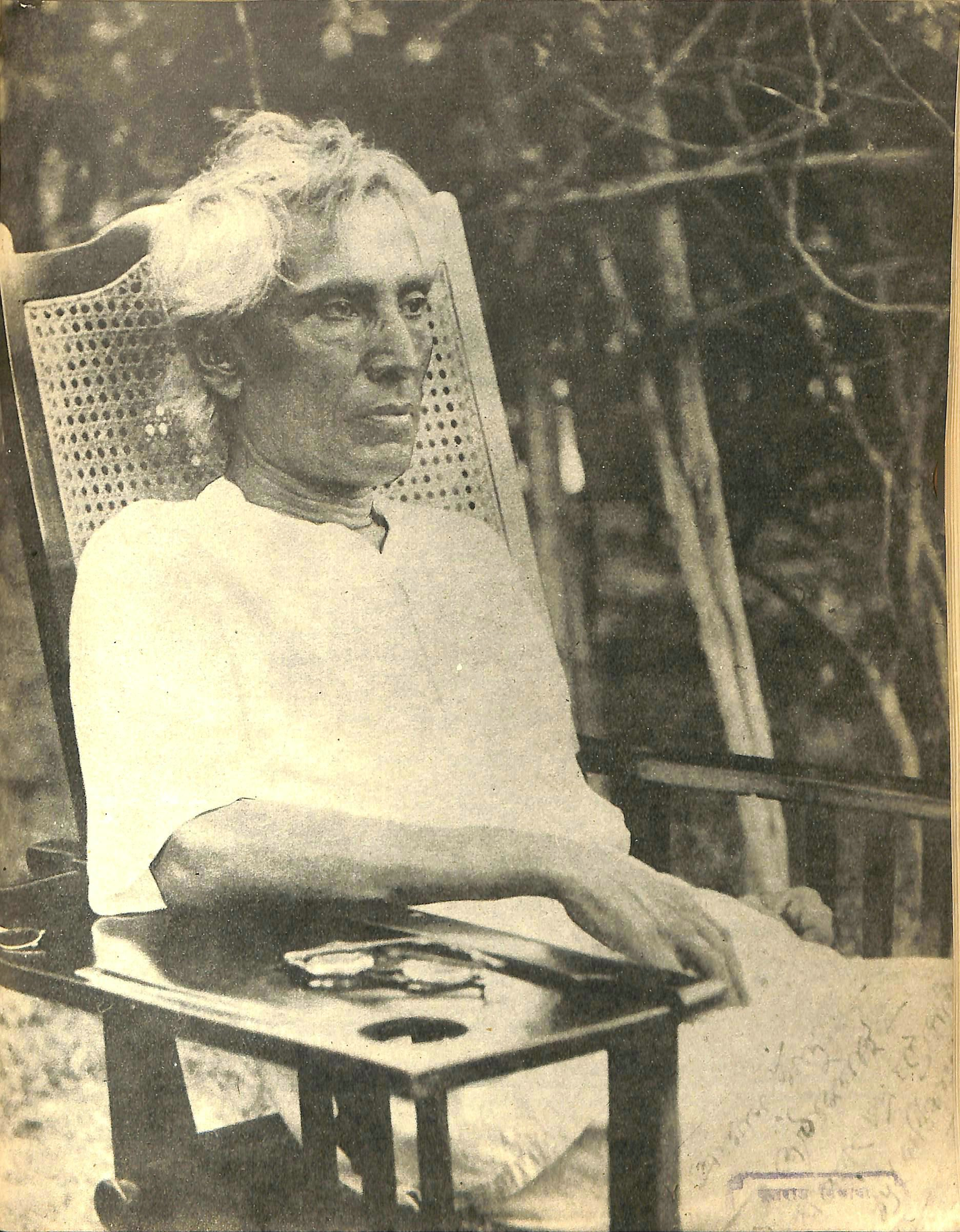
Sarat Chandra Chattopadhyay

A Bengali mistri friend, Krishna Das Adhikari, requested him to marry his 14-year-old widow daughter, Mokshada. Sarat Chandra was initially reluctant, but he eventually agreed. He renamed his wife Hironmoyee and taught her to read and write. They did not have any children. But one of his descendant Sachindranath Mukherjee decided to write his daily life into a story. Later it was published by his grandson Abhinav Mukherjee.

== House of Chattopadhyay ==
After returning from Burma, Sarat Chandra stayed for 11 years in Baje Shibpur, Howrah. Then he made a house in the village of Samta, in 1923, where he spent the later twelve years as a novelist. Samadhi are within the house's compound. Trees still stand tall in the gardens of the house.

== Impact and legacy ==
=== J. D. Anderson's Views ===
James Drummond Anderson, who was a member of the prestigious Indian Civil Service of British India and a leading authority on several Indian languages, was an early admirer of Sarat Chandra. In an article entitled "A New Bengali Writer" in London's prestigious Times Literary Supplement dated 11 July 1918, Anderson writes: "His knowledge of the ways and thoughts and language of women and children, his power of transferring these vividly to the printed page, are such as are rare indeed in any country. In India, and especially in the great "joint family" residences of Bengal, swarming with women of all ages and babies of all sizes, there is a form of speech appropriated to women's needs, which Mr. [Rudyard] Kipling somewhere describes as choti boli, the "little language." Of this Mr. Chatterjee is an admirable master, to an extent indeed not yet attained, we believe, by any other Indian writer.

Anderson comments about Sarat Chandra's fondness for the past: "Mr. Chatterjee is much too true an artist to allow his gift of kindly yet scrupulously accurate observation to be distracted by social or political prejudice. He is, we gather, on the whole inclined towards a sane conservatism: he remains a Hindu at heart in a country whose whole civilization is based on Hindu culture. He has, we dimly suspect, his doubts as to the wisdom and working of Europeanized versions of the old religion and the old customs. But he is so keen and amused a spectator of the life about him, whether in cosmopolitan Calcutta or in somnolent little villages buried in dense verdure among the sunny ricefields, that it is not without doubts and diffidence that we attribute to him a tendency to praise past times and comfortable old conventions."

Regarding Sarat Chandra's popularity, he noted: "It is of excellent omen that Mr. Chatterjee's art has received such instant and wide appreciation in his own country Let us hope that in other Indian provinces there are rising authors as keenly observant and gifted with a like faculty of easy and natural expression."

About the difficulties of translating his work, Anderson opines: "It may be doubted whether Mr. Chatterjee's tales can be adequately rendered into English, and therefore, perhaps, some apology is due to English readers who may never come across any of the work of this talented young Bengali." Anderson planned to translate his works. But he died in 1920 and the translations never happened.

Anderson's article was both prophetic and one of the best assessments of Sarat Chandra.

=== Views of Indian writers and academics ===
The phenomenal popularity of Sarat Chandra Chattopadhyay has been attested by some of the most prominent writers as well as literary critics across India in their writings. Most of the authors in Assam and Odisha, at least before the Independence, read him admiringly in original Bengali; rest of India read him in translations in varying quality.

Publishers were never tired of reprinting his works; he remains the most translated, the most adapted and the most plagiarized author. His novels also reached a number of people through the medium of film and he is still an important force in Indian cinema.

Malayalam poet and lyricist O. N. V. Kurup writes "...Sarat Chandra's name is cherished as dearly as the names of eminent Malayalam novelists. His name has been a household word".

Dr Mirajkar informs "the translations of Sarat Chandra created a stir amongst the readers and writers all over Maharashtra. He has become a known literary personality in Maharashtra in the rank of any popular Marathi writers including H. N. Apte, V. S. Khandekar, N. S. Phadke and G. T. Madkholkar".

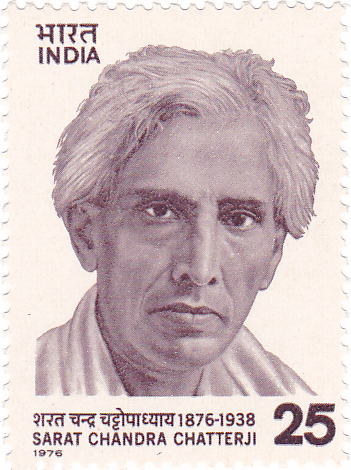
Sarat Chandra Chattopadhyay on Indian postage stamp.

Jainendra Kumar, who considers that his contribution towards the creation and preservation of cultural India is second, perhaps, only to that of Gandhi, asks a rhetorical question summing up Sarat Chandra's position and presumably the role of translation and inter-literary relationship: "Sarat Chandra was a writer in Bengali; but where is that Indian language in which he did not become the most popular when he reached it?"

== Screen adaptations ==
Nearly 90 screen adaptations have been made in the Indian subcontinent based on Sarat Chandra Chattopadhyay's works.

=== Devdas ===
More than twenty films and television series have been based on his novel Devdas. They have been made in Bangladesh, India, and Pakistan; in languages Assamese, Bengali, Hindi, Malayalam, Odia, Tamil, Telugu, and Urdu.

=== Selected screen adaptations ===
His romantic drama novel Datta was adapted into the Bengali film as Datta in 1951 directed by Saumyen Mukhopadhyay starring Sunanda Banerjee and Manoranjan Bhattacharyya with Ahindra Choudhury as Rashbehari. The 1961 Telugu film Vagdanam by Acharya Aatreya was loosely based on the novel. The 1976 Bengali film starring Suchitra Sen and Soumitra Chatterjee and a 2023 film starring Rituparna Sengupta were based on Datta.

Apne Paraye (1980) by Basu Chatterjee, starring Amol Palekar, was based on Nishkriti. The Telugu film Thodi Kodallu (1957) was also based on this novel.

In 1957 Bardidi (translate: oldest sister) was made by director Ajoy Kar based on the novel with the same name. Two more films on the novel followed. In 1961, Batasari (translation: Wayfarer) was made in Telugu language, produced and directed by Ramakrishna of Bharani Pictures. It was simultaneously made in Tamil as Kaanal Neer (translation: Mirage).

Rajlakshmi O Srikanta (1958), and Indranath Srikanta O Annadadidi (1959), based on Srikanta, were made by Haridas Bhattacharya and Kamallata (1969). Rajlakshmi Srikanta (1987), Iti Srikanta (2004) were also based on Srikanta.

Chandranath, a 1957 film starring Uttam Kumar and Suchitra Sen, was based on Sarat Chandra's novella Chandranath. The 1966 Kannada movie Thoogudeepa was also based on the same novel.

=== Other films ===
Majhli Didi (1967) by Hrishikesh Mukherjee, and Swami (1977), for which he was awarded the Filmfare Award for Best Story, are other adaptations.

Chhoti Bahu (1971) and Bindur Chhele (1973) are based on his 1913 novel Bindur Chhele.

Gulzar's 1975 film, Khushboo is majorly inspired by his work Pandit Moshai.

Sabyasachi (film) was released in 1977 based on his work Pather Dabi.

Chattopadhyay's works also served as an inspiration behind the making of the 2006 Hindi feature film Vivah.

In 2026 Srijit Mukherji Directed a film named "Emperor vs Sarat Chandra" on the occasion of 150 years of Sarat Chandra's immortal novel "Pather Dabi". Which released on 15th October, 2026 in the time of Durga Pujo. Starred by Abir Chatterjee, Tota Roy Chowdhury, Mimi Chakraborty, Divyani Mondal , Sanjoy Nag and other many talented actors.

=== Award ===
Sarat Chandra posthumously won the 1978 Filmfare Award for Best Story for Swami (1977).

== Works ==
Sarat Chandra primarily wrote novels, novellas, and stories. In 1903, his first printed work, Mandir, was published. His first novel, Bardidi, was serialized in the Bharati magazine and made him famous.

=== Novels and Novellas ===
- Bardidi (1907, 1913)
- Biraj Bou (1914)
- Pandit Moshai (1914)
- Chandranath (1916)
- Parinita (1916)
- Baikunther Will (1916)
- Pallisomaj (1916)
- Devdas (1917)
- Choritrohin (1917)
- Nishkrti (1917)
- Srikanta (Part 1–4, 1917–1933)
- Datta (1918)
- Grihadaha (1920)
- Bamuner Meye (1920)
- Dena-Paona (1923)
- Pather Dabi (1926)
- Shes Proshno (1931)

He also wrote essays, which were anthologized in Narir Mulya (1923) and Svadesh O Sahitya (1932). Shrikanta, Charitrahin, Devdas, Grihadaha, Dena-Paona and Pather Dabi are among his most popular works. Pather Dabi was banned by the British Government because of its revolutionary theme. His posthumous publications include Chhelebelar Galpa, Shubhada (1938), Sheser Parichay (1939), Sharat Chandrer Granthabali (1948) and Sharat Chandrer Aprakashita Rachanabali (1951).

He wrote some essays including Narir Itihas (The History of Women) and Narir Mulya (The Value of Women). Narir Itihas, which was lost in a house fire, contained a history of women on the lines of Spencer's Descriptive Sociology. While the second, Narir Mulya gives a theory of women's rights in the context of Mill's and Spencer's arguments.

=== Stories ===
- Aalo O Chhaya
- Abhagir Swargo
- Anupamar Prem
- Anuradha
- Andhare Aalo
- Balya Smriti
- Bilashi
- Bindur Chhele, (Bindu's Son) 1913
- Bojha
- Cheledhora
- Chobi
- Darpochurno (Broken Pride)
- Ekadoshi Bairagi
- Kashinath
- Haricharan
- Harilakshmi
- Lalu (parts 1, 2, and 3)
- Mamlar Phol
- Mandir
- Mahesh (The Drought)
- Mejdidi
- Bochor Panchash Purber Ekti Kahini
- Paresh
- Path Nirdesh
- Ramer Shumoti, (Ram's Good Sense) 1914
- Sati
- Swami (The Husband)

=== Plays ===
Sarat Chandra converted three of his works into plays.

- Bijoya
- Rama
- Shoroshi
- Jai hind

==== Essays ====
- Narir Mulya
- Swadesh O Sahitya
- Taruner Bidroho

==== Other works ====
- Dehati Samaj, 1920
- Sharoda (published posthumously)

==== Biography ====
- Awara Masiha (in Hindi) by Vishnu Prabhakar
- Great Vagabond: Biography and Immortal Works of Sarat Chandra Chatterjee

== See also ==
- Films based on works by Sarat Chandra Chattopadhyay
- Samtaber, the village where Sarat Chandra spent his life's early years as a novelist
- Sarat Chandra Kuthi, the house of Sarat Chandra at Samtaber
- List of Indian writers

== Cited works ==
- Sil, Narasingha P. (2012). The Life of Sharatchandra Chattopadhyay: Drifter and Dreamer. Fairleigh Dickinson University Press. ISBN 978-1-61147-507-4.
- Naravane, Vishwanath S. (1976). Sarat Chandra Chatterji. Meerut: Macmillan Company of India. ISBN 9780333901496.
