= Yankin Township =

Township of Yangon, Myanmar

Yankin Township ရန်ကင်း မြို့နယ်
- Township of Yangon
- Yankin Township
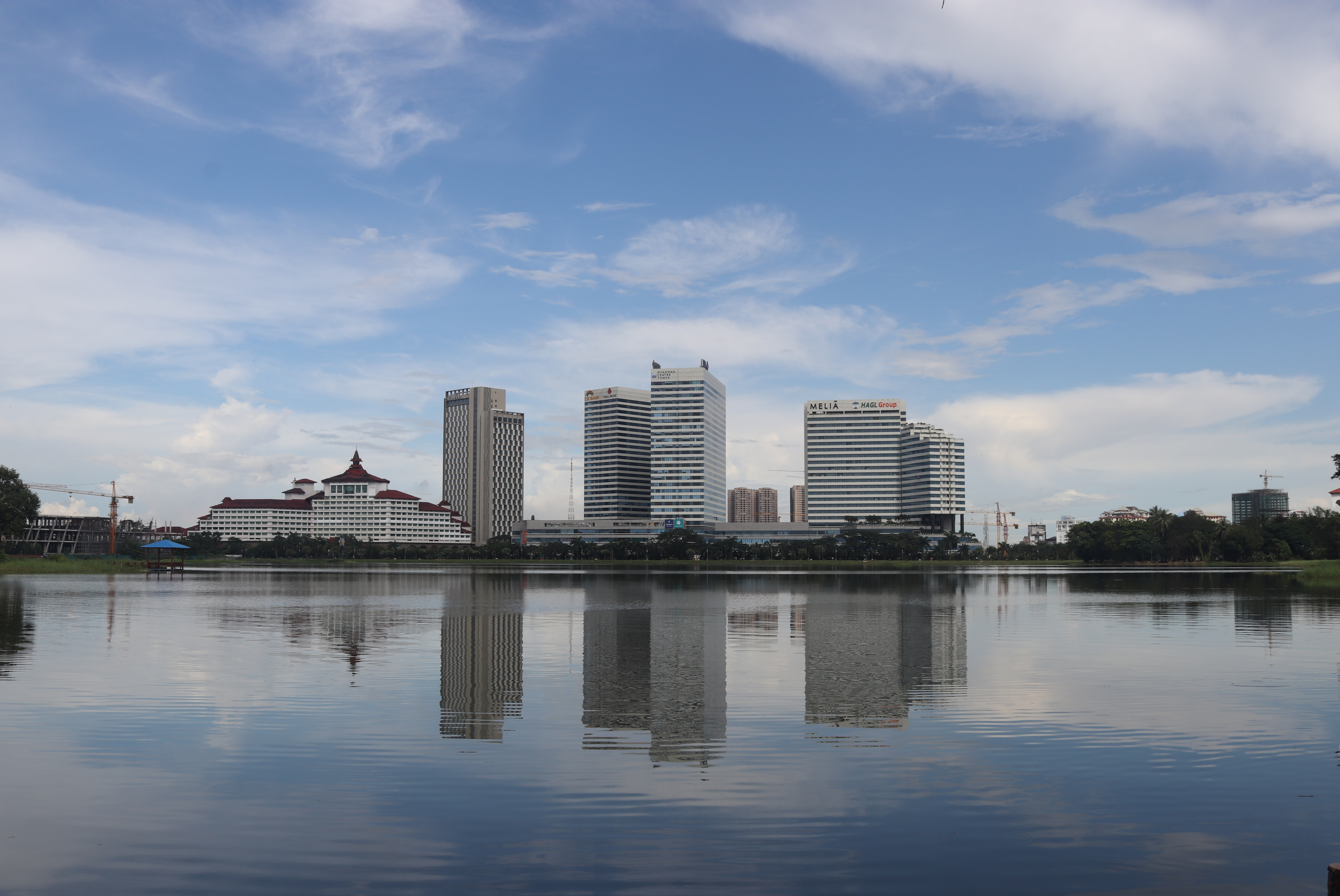

- Location within Myanmar
- Coordinates: 16°49′25″N 96°9′46″E
- Country: Myanmar
- Region: Yangon Region
- City: Yangon
- District: Thingangyun District

Area
  - Total: 5.030 km^{2} (1.9421 sq mi)

Population (2000)
  - Total: 155,000
  - Density: 30,800/km^{2} (79,800/sq mi)
- Time zone: UTC6:30 (MST)
- Postal codes: 11081
- Area codes: 1 (mobile: 80, 99)

Yankin Township (Burmese: ရန်ကင်း မြို့နယ်, pronounced [jàɰ̃ɡɪ́ɰ̃ mjo̰nɛ̀]) is located in the north-central part of Yangon. The township comprises 15 wards, and shares borders with Mayangon township in the north, Thingangyun township and South Okkalapa township in the east, the Inya Lake, Bahan township and Mayangon township in the west, and Tamwe township in the south. The township has 13 primary schools, seven middle schools and two high schools.

Yankin is a thriving commercial hub of Yangon. Yankin Centre is a leading shopping destination in Yangon, attracting shoppers from around the city. Saya San Road is the main thoroughfare that runs through most of the important places in the township. The Kokkine Swimming Pools, and the 18-hectare (44.5-acre) Myakyuntha Amusement Park are both located here. In 2008, the National Library of Myanmar moved to a new site in Yankin Township. In 2011, a new children's hospital opened in the township, occupying the site of an old Ministry of Mining building.

Yankin is a mix of upscale and middle-class areas with a multi-ethnic character. The township has a large Tamil community, and a rich collection of Hindu temples (most of which are dedicated to Kali and Ganesh), as well as a large Chinese temple called Fushan Temple, believed to be the largest in Yangon.

The Moekaung Pagoda is the principal pagoda of the area, and the annual Moekaung Pagoda Festival attracts a number of people from around the city.

== Etymology ==
Yankin means Free of Strife. The name was given by King Alaungpaya of Konbaung Dynasty in 1755 after he had conquered a small village named Thanlyin Kin as part of his reunification of the country.

== Landmarks ==
Yankin was home to a number of government ministry headquarters before they were moved to Naypyidaw in 2006. The Central Bank of Myanmar, the Ministry of Interior, the Ministry of Industries 1, the Ministry of Industries 2, the Ministry of Mines and the Ministry of Forestry all had their main offices here.

Yankin Apartments was part of one of the many public housing programs implemented by U Nu's government.

The following is a list of landmarks protected by the city in Yankin township.

Structure	Type	Address	Notes
Kalayana Temple (Zekwet Pagoda)	Temple	Dhammayon Road	
Mogaung Pagoda (Moekaung Pagoda)	Pagoda	Mogaung Pagoda Road (Corner of Dhmmayon Road)	
Nagalein Pagoda	Pagoda	Budayon Road	
Supramanayan Hindu Temple	Hindu Temple	Budayon Road	
