= Debanandapur =

- Village
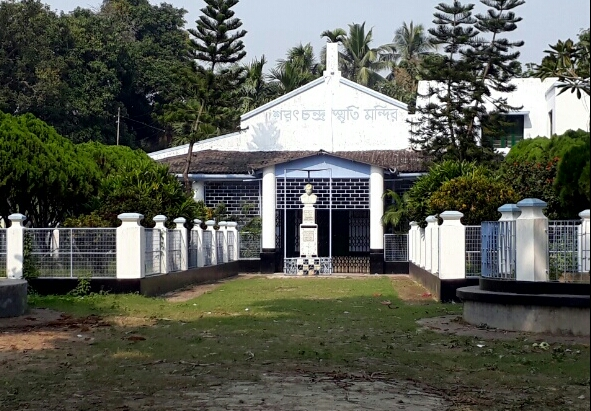
- Birth place of Sarat Chandra Chattopadhyay

- Location in West Bengal, India Debanandapur (India)
- Coordinates: 22.932611°N 88.372917°E
- Country: India
- State: West Bengal
- District: Hooghly

Population (2011)
  - Total: 3,449

Languages
  - Official: Bengali, English
- Time zone: UTC+5:30 (IST)
- Telephone/STD code: 03213
- Lok Sabha constituency: Hooghly
- Vidhan Sabha constituency: Chunchura
- Website: hooghly.gov.in

Debanandapur is a village beside the Saraswati River and a gram panchayat in the Chinsurah Mogra CD block in the Chinsurah subdivision of the Hooghly district in the state of West Bengal, India.

The village has ancient temples like Radha Krishna Temple beside Saraswati River. The said temple is in dilapidated condition.

== Geography ==
Bandel-Saptagram Area as it is today
R: rural/ urban centre, F: facility, H: historical site
Owing to space constraints in the small map, the actual locations in a larger map may vary slightly

=== Location ===
Debanandapur is located at 22.932611°N 88.372917°E.

== Sarat Chandra Chatterjee ==
Debanandapur is the birthplace of the novelist Sarat Chandra Chattopadhyay. His dwelling house is now a library named Sarat Smriti Pathagar and a museum housing his belongings. It is 2 km from Bandel Junction railway station.

== Demographics ==
According to the 2011 Census of India, Debanandapur had a total population of 3,449 of which 1,789 (52%) were males and 1,660 (48%) were females. Population in the age range 0–6 years was 315. The total number of literate persons in Debanandapur was 2,481 (79.16% of the population over 6 years).

== Gallery ==
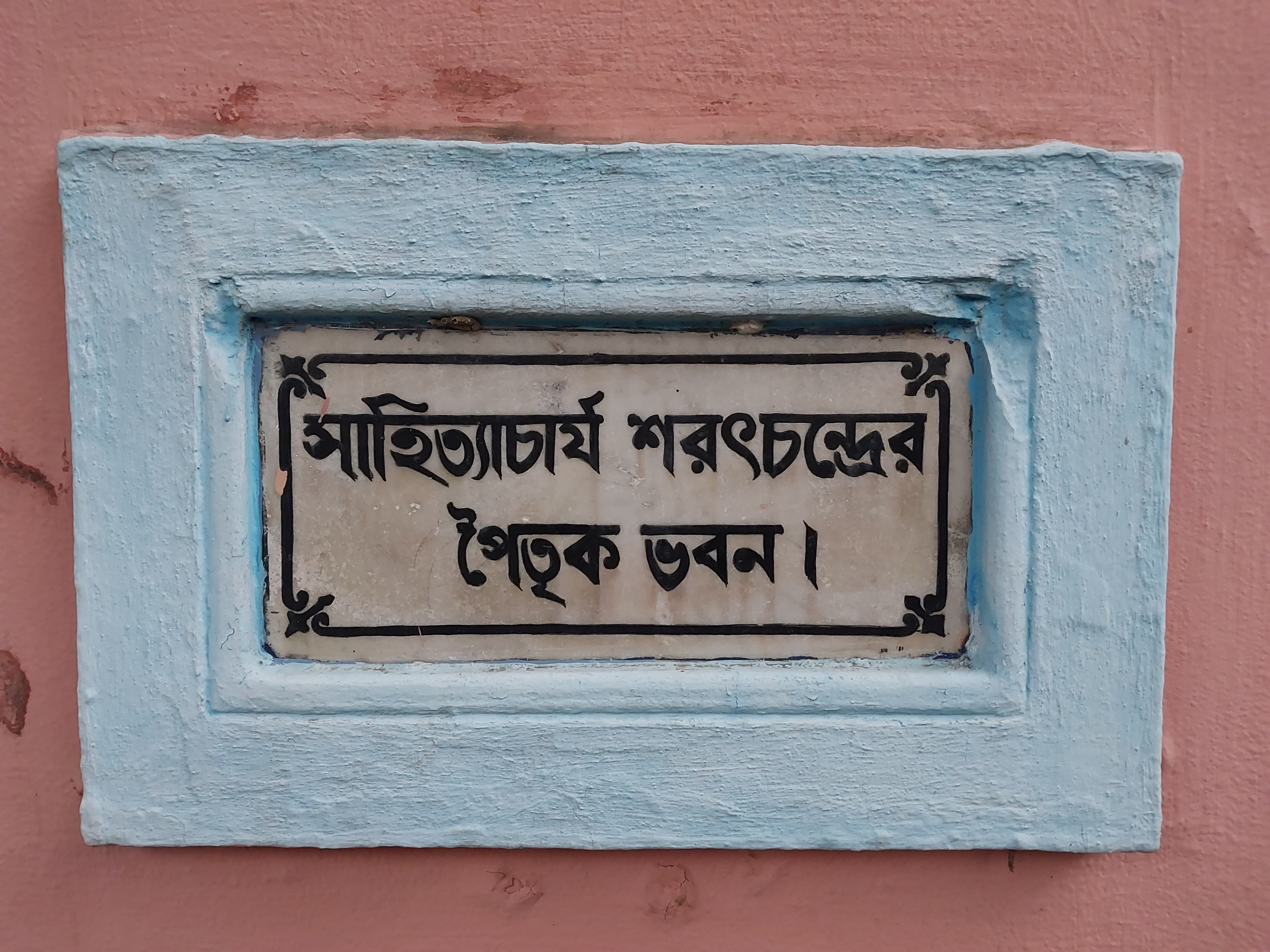
Birthplace and house of Sarat Chandra Chattopadhyay

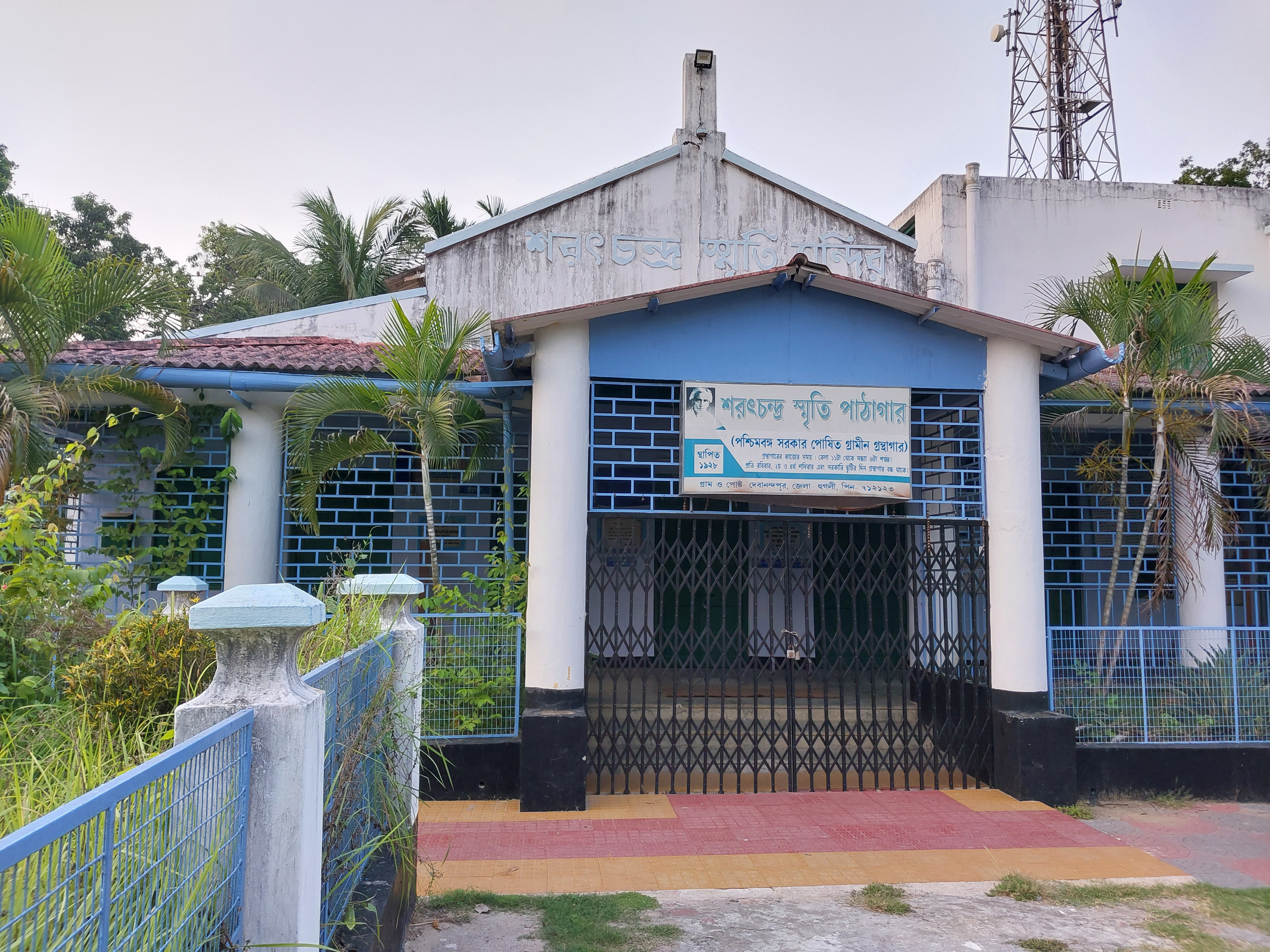
Sarat Smriti Mandir, a library and research center

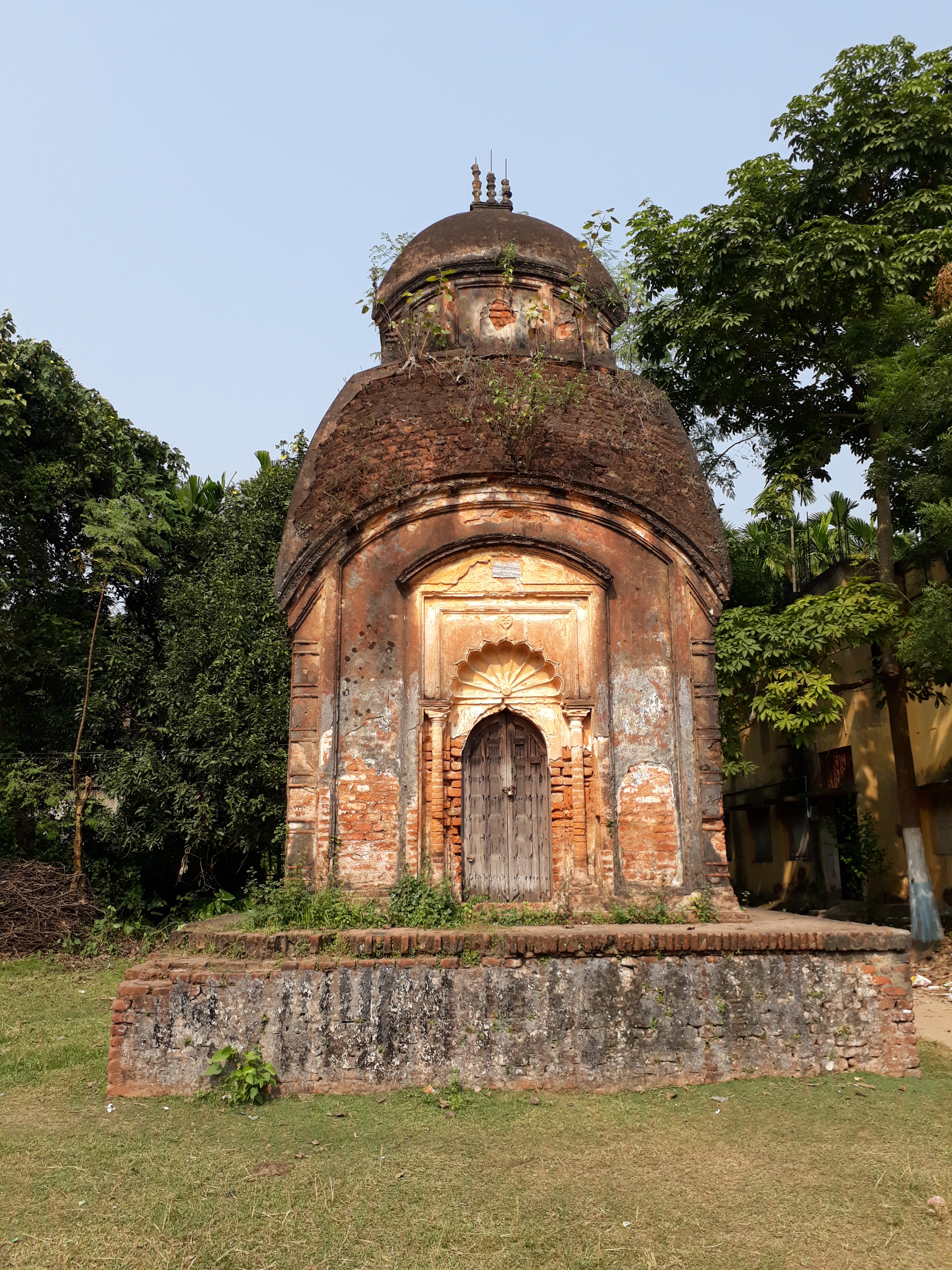
Old Shiva temple, Debanandapur

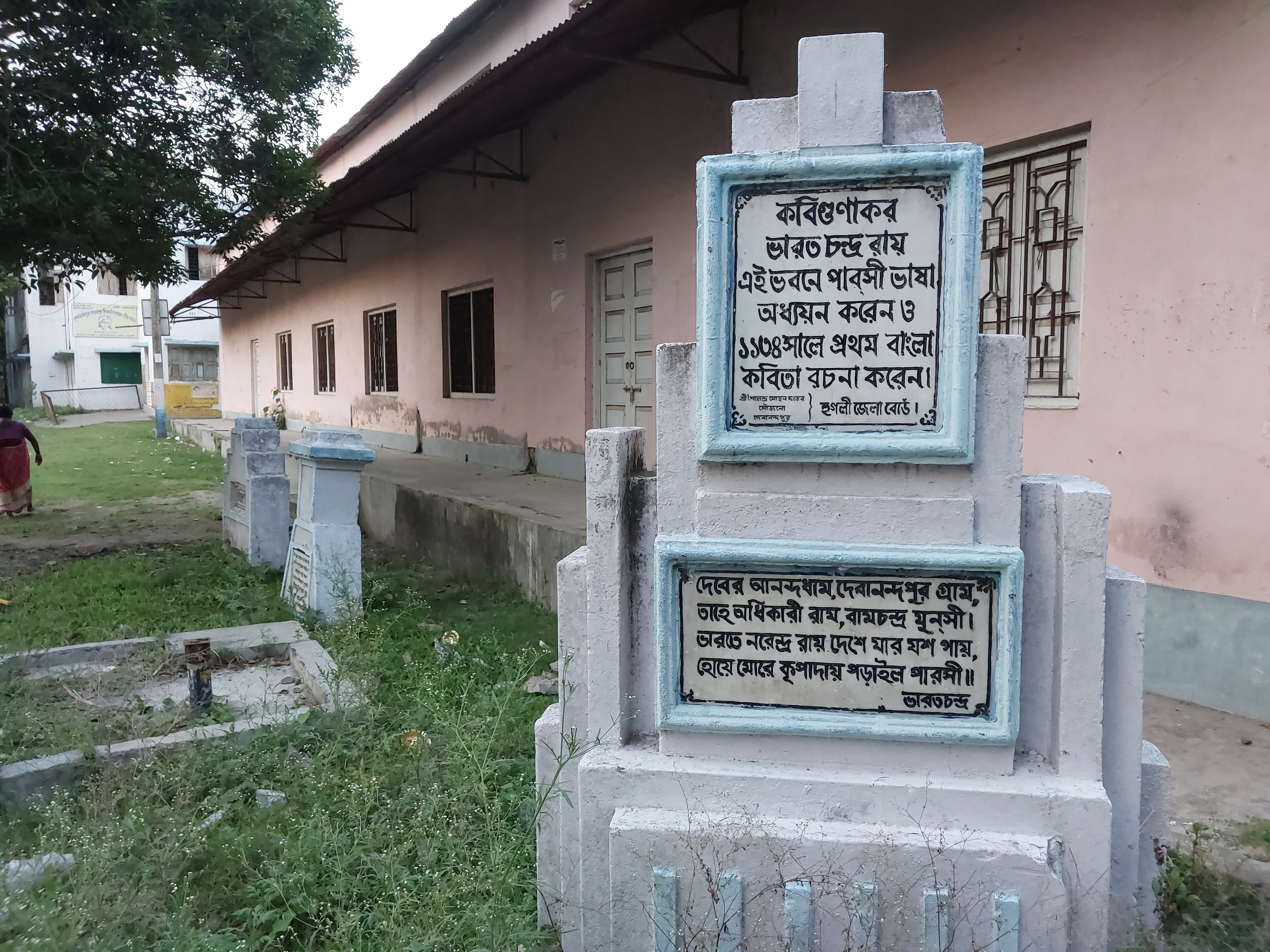
Heritage plaque at Debanandapur

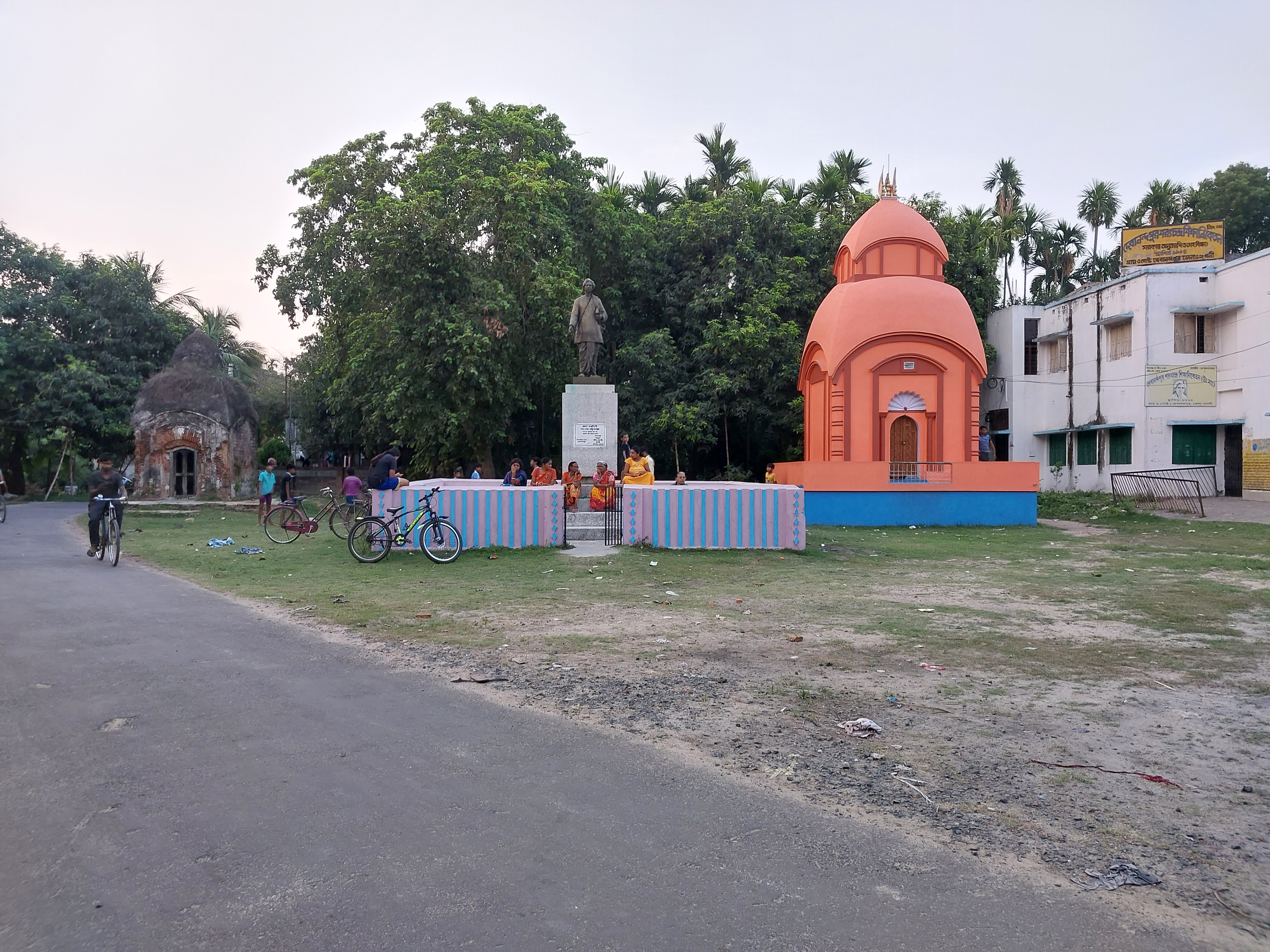
Temple and Sarat statue

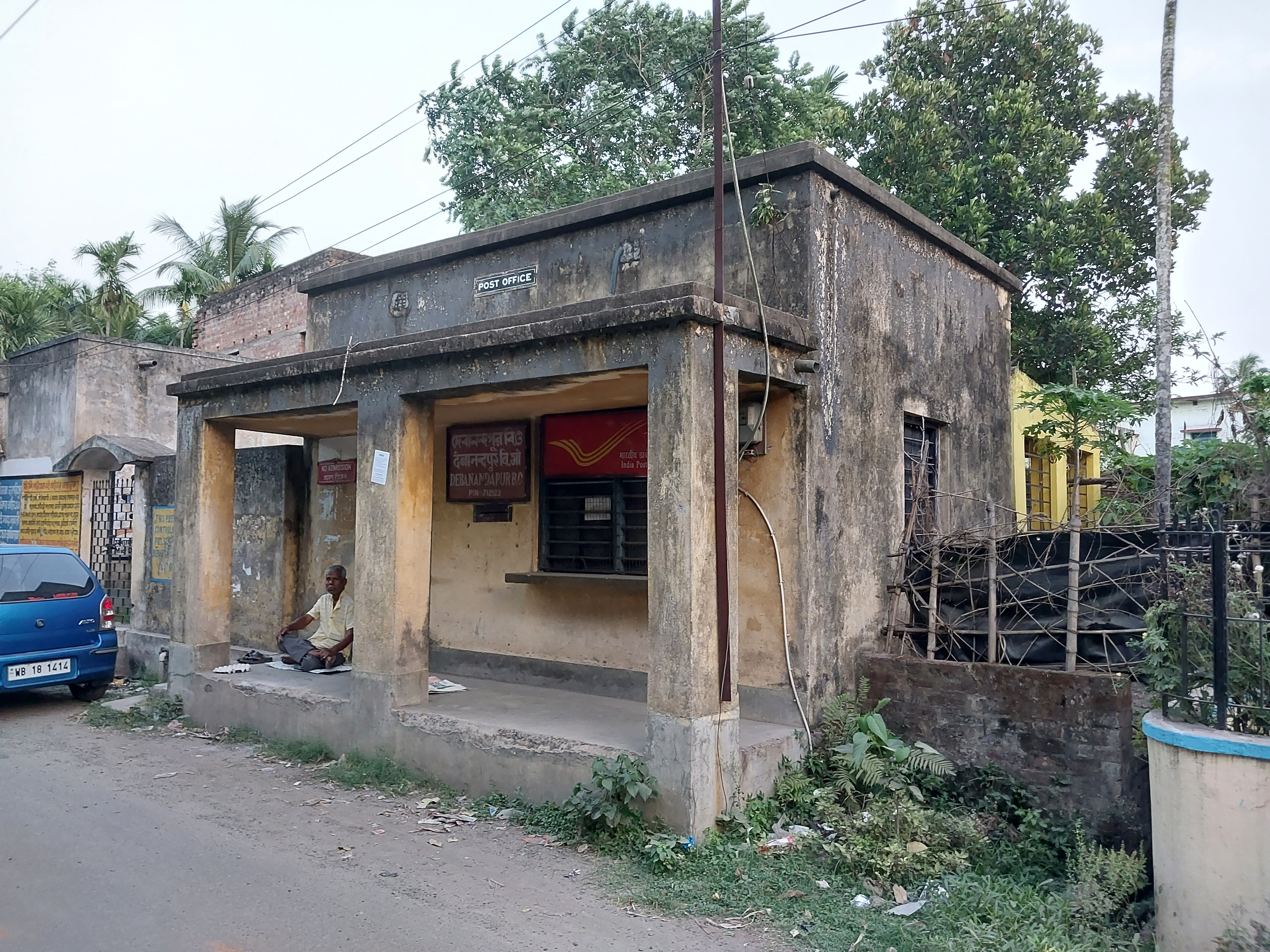
Debanandapur Post Office
