= Yangon Workers' Hospital =

Coordinates: 16°47′53″N 96°10′19″E

- Social Security Board
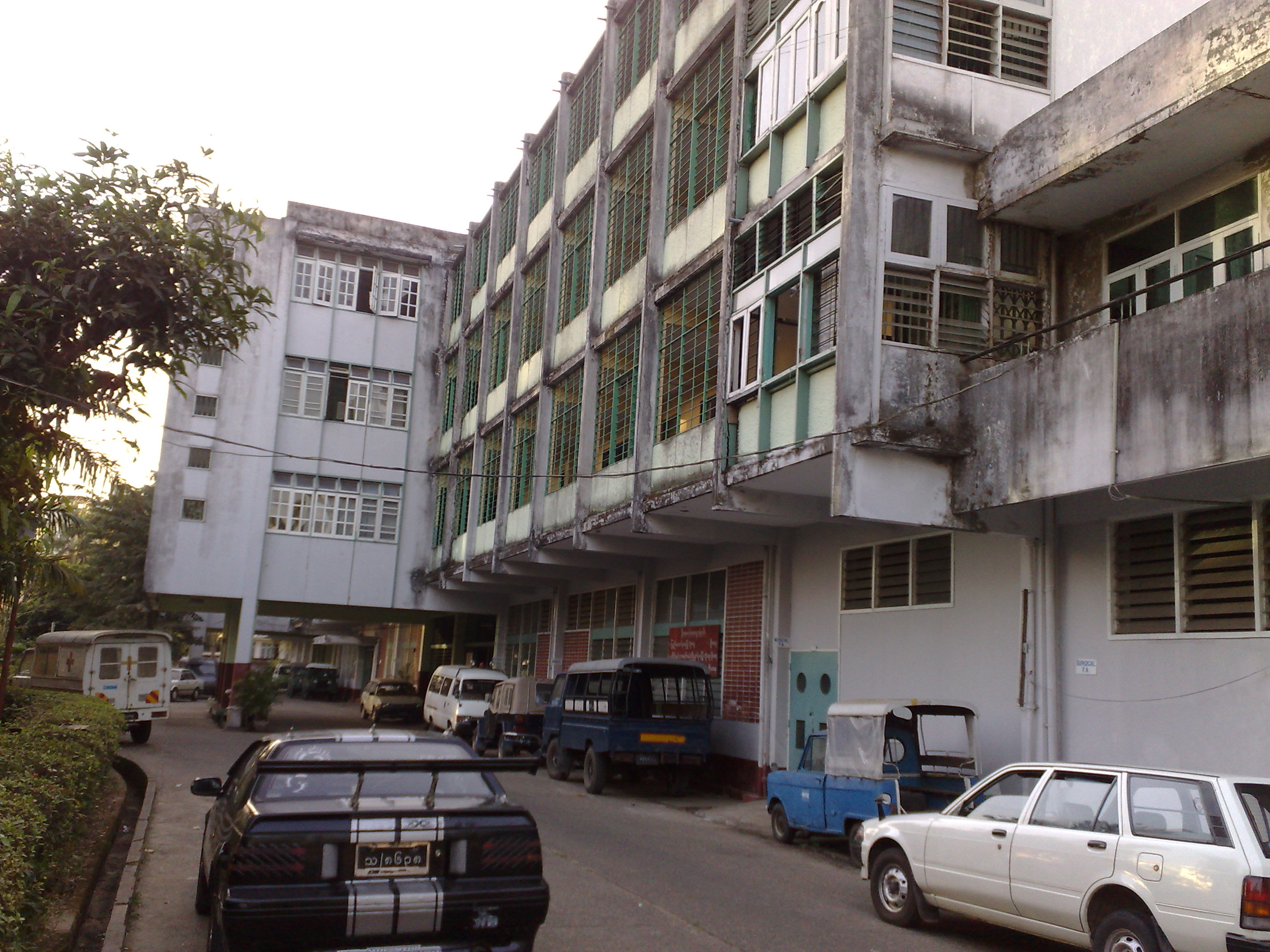

Geography
- Location: Tamwe Township, Yangon, Yangon Region, Myanmar

Organisation
- Type: Teaching
- Affiliated university: University of Medicine 1, Yangon

Services
- Emergency department: Yes
- Beds: 250

History
- Founded: 1962

Links
- Lists: Hospitals in Myanmar

The Yangon Workers' Hospital (Burmese: အလုပ်သမား ဆေးရုံကြီး (ရန်ကုန်)) is a public hospital in Yangon, Myanmar. It is one of the three social security hospitals and provides free medical services to workers insured by the Social Security Board. It is also a teaching hospital of University of Medicine 1, Yangon.
