= Tamwe Township =

Township of Yangon, Myanmar

Tamwe Township တာမွေ မြို့နယ်
- Township of Yangon
- Tamwe Township
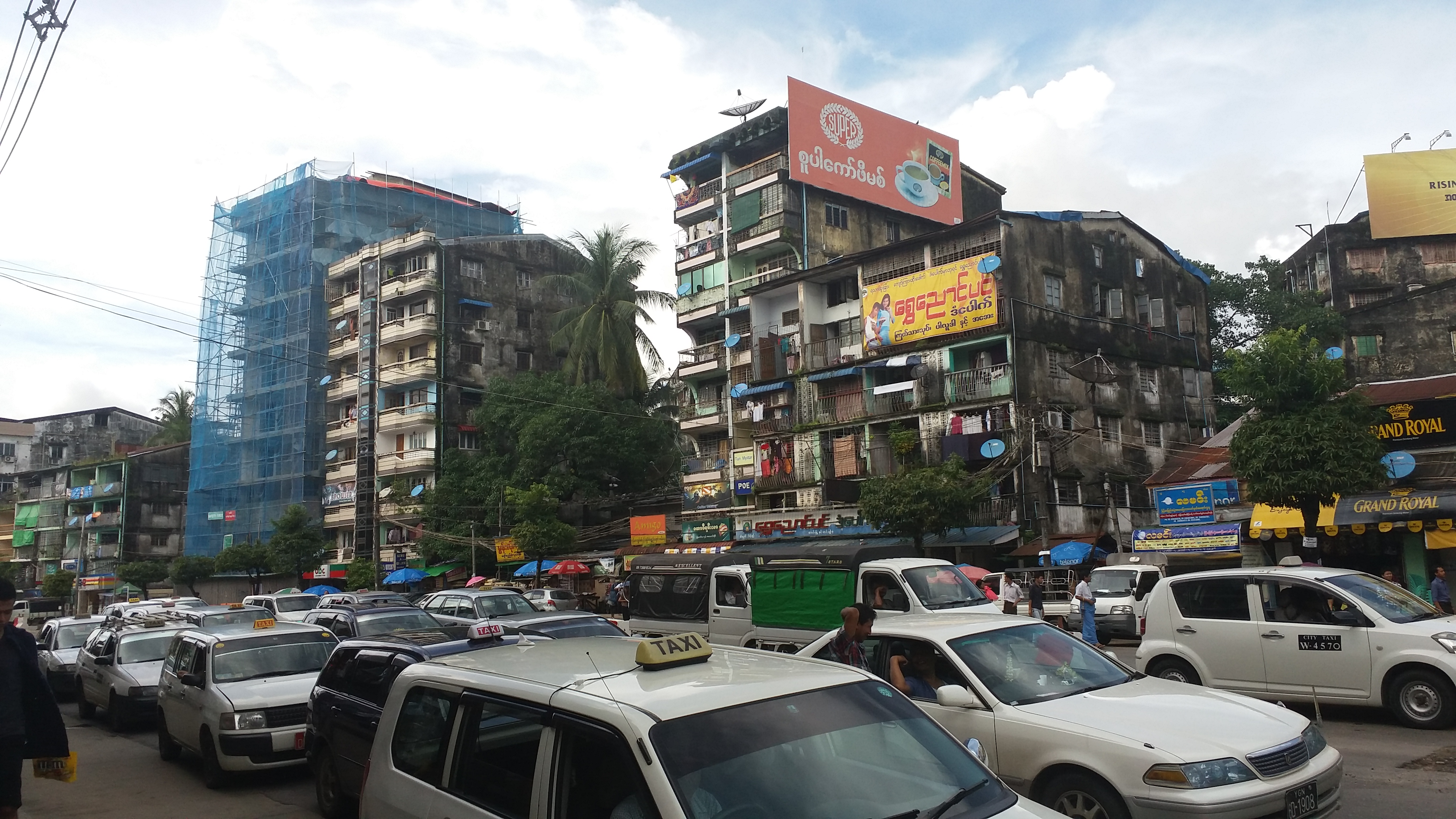
- U Chit Maung Road near Shwegonedaing Junction, 2015

- Location within Myanmar
- Coordinates: 16°46′16″N 96°10′0″E
- Country: Myanmar
- Region: Yangon Region
- City: Yangon
- District: Thingangyun District

Area
  - Total: 4.41 km^{2} (1.70 sq mi)

Population (2009)
  - Total: 140,000
  - Density: 32,000/km^{2} (82,000/sq mi)
- Time zone: UTC6:30 (MST)
- Postal codes: 11211, 11212
- Area codes: 1 (mobile: 80, 99)

Tamwe Township (also Tarmway Township; Burmese: တာမွေ မြို့နယ်, pronounced [tàmwè mjo̰nɛ̀]) is located in east central Yangon, Myanmar. The township comprises 20 wards, and shares borders with Yankin Township in the north, Thingangyun Township in the northeast, Bahan Township in the west, and Mingala Taungnyunt township in the south.

== Etymology ==
"Tamwe" derives from the Mon language term "Tamoa" (Mon: တာမွဲ; [ta mòa]), which means "one toddy palm tree."

== Education ==
The township has 30 primary schools, four middle schools and six high schools.

== Population ==
As of March 2014, Tamwe has a population of 165,313 with 45.2% male residents and 54.8% female residents.

== Landmarks ==
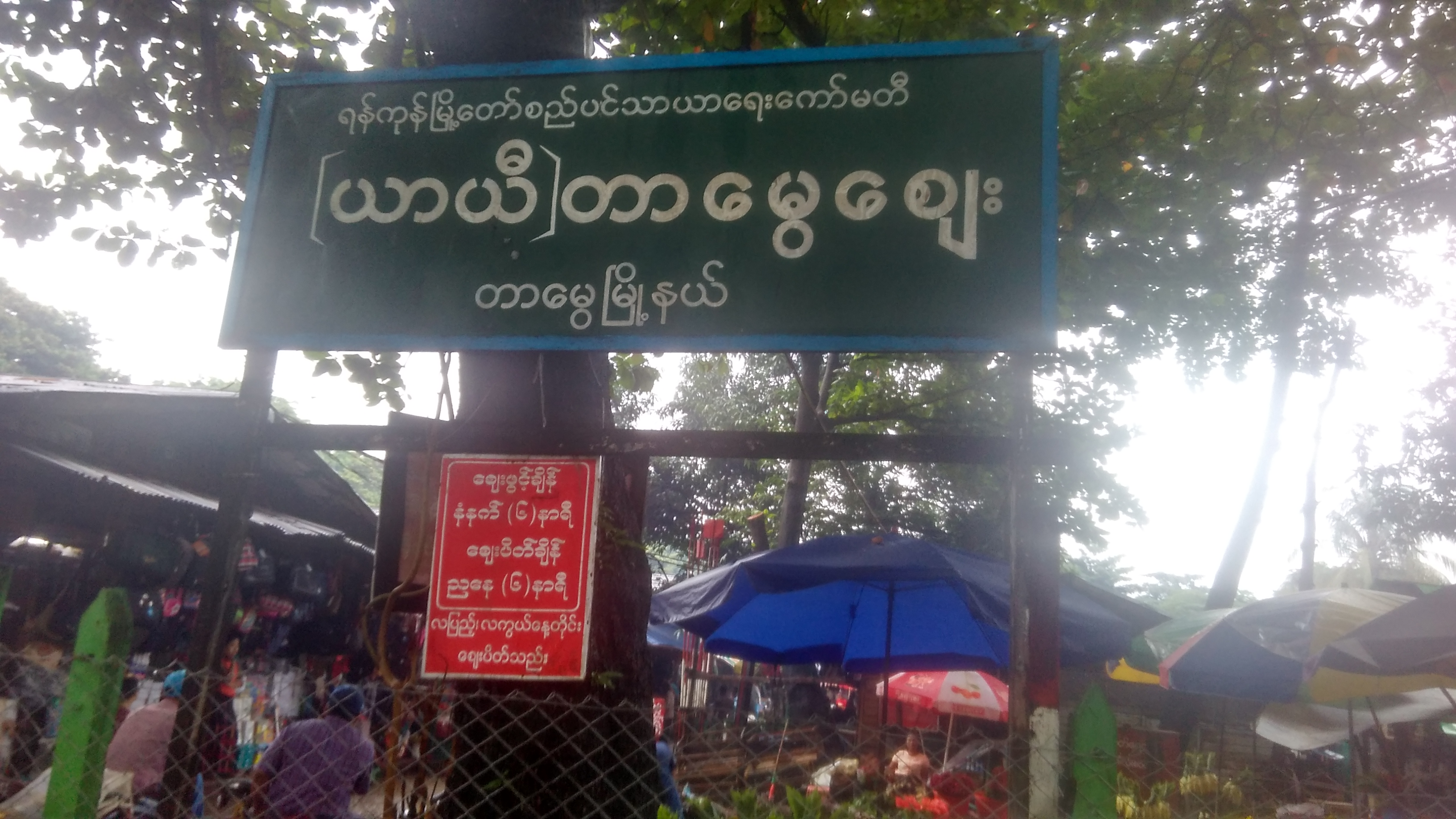
Tamwe Market in Tamwe Township (new building in progress of building as of June 2026)

The following is a list of landmarks protected by the city in Tamwe township.

Structure	Type	Address	Notes
St. Francis' Catholic Church	Church	131 Kyaikkasan Road	Ocean Supermarket Shwegondine Road

The Yangon Workers' Hospital, one of the city's three Social Security Board-funded free hospitals, is located in Tamwe.
