= Thingangyun Township =

Township of Yangon, Myanmar

Thingangyun Township သင်္ဃန်းကျွန်း မြို့နယ်
- Township of Yangon
- Thingangyun Township
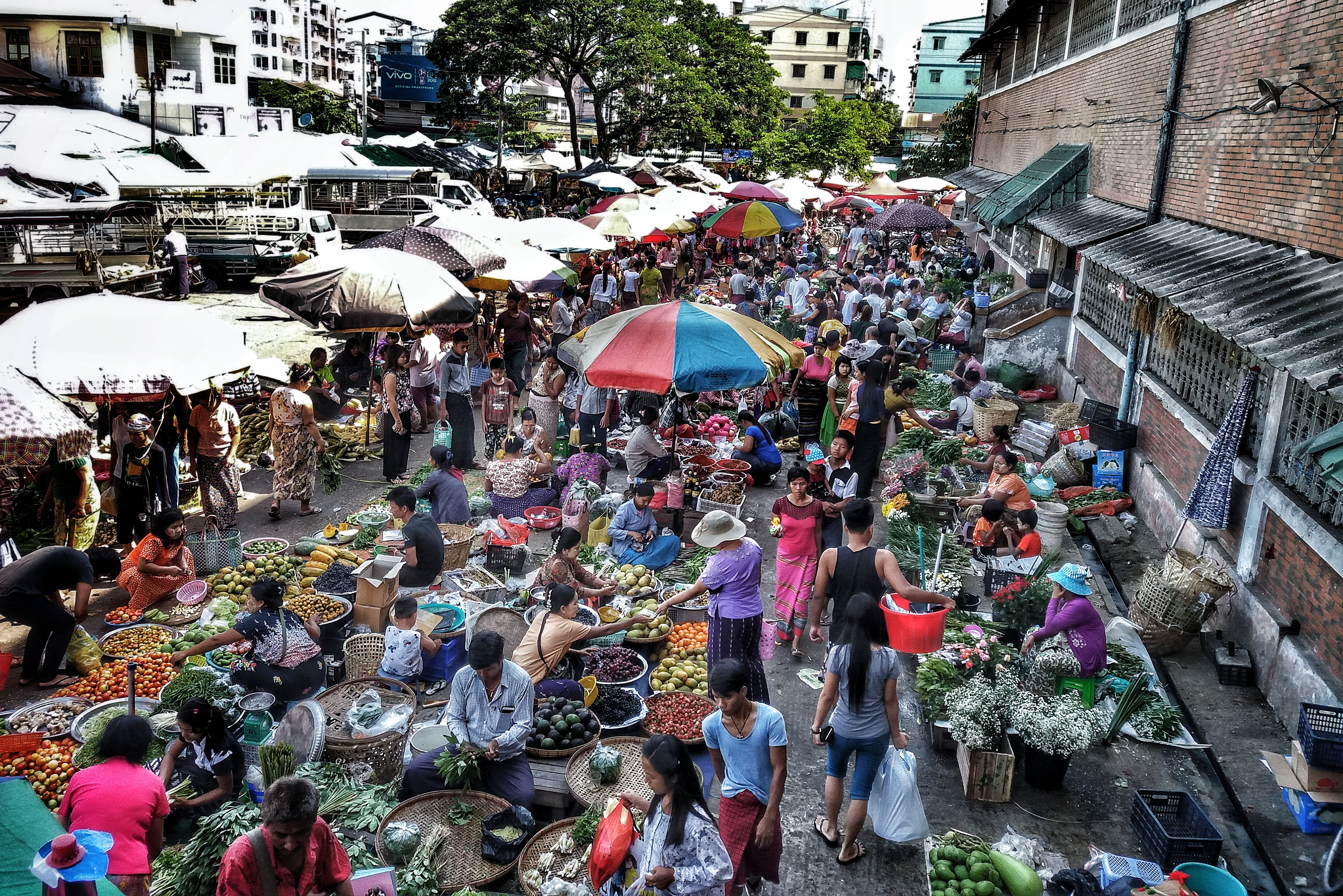
- A street market in Thingangyun

- Location within Myanmar
- Coordinates: 16°49′41″N 96°11′3″E
- Country: Myanmar
- Region: Yangon Region
- City: Yangon
- District: Thingangyun District

Area
  - Total: 11.5 km^{2} (4.44 sq mi)

Population (2014)
  - Total: 209,486
  - Density: 18,200/km^{2} (47,200/sq mi)
- Time zone: UTC6:30 (MST)
- Postal codes: 11071, 11072
- Area codes: 1 (mobile: 80, 99)

Thingangyun Township (Burmese: သင်္ဃန်းကျွန်း မြို့နယ်, MLCTS: sangghan:kywan: mrui.nai, pronounced [θɪ̀ɰ̃ɡáɰ̃dʑʊ́ɰ̃ mjo̰nɛ̀]) is located in the eastern part of Yangon, Myanmar. The township comprises 38 wards, and shares borders with South Okkalapa township in the north, North Dagon township in the east, Yankin township and Tamwe township in the west, and Thaketa township in the south. The township has 40 primary schools, four middle schools and five high schools.

The township is home to Thingangyun Education College and University of Dental Medicine, Yangon.

The city's main sporting venues, the Thuwunna Stadium and the Thuwunna Indoor Stadium are located on the western side of the township.

== Landmarks ==
The following is a list of landmarks protected by the city in Thingangyun township.

Structure	Type	Address
Kyaikkasan Pagoda (Mon: စေတဳကျာ်ဒစာံ)	Pagoda	Kyaikkasan Pagoda Road
St. Joseph's Church	Church	1-3 Thiri Marla Road
Thanyok Monastery	Monastery	Kyauksadaing Road
Sitthi Vinayagar (Maha Pain Nae) Hindu Temple	Tamil Hindu Temple	Bawga Street, GhaNge Ward.
Myò-oo Pagoda	Pagoda	Aung Awba St, Kamákyi, Suvaṇṇa (Thuwanna)
Myò-oo Pagoda	Pagoda	Aung Awba St, Kamákyi, Suvaṇṇa (Thuwanna)
Shree Krishna Temple	Tamil Hindu Temple	Kha Kwe Ward
Arulmigu Maari Amman Aalayam	Tamil Hindu Temple	Hnin Si Kone
