= National Library of Myanmar =

National library in Yangon, Myanmar

- အမျိုးသားစာကြည့်တိုက်

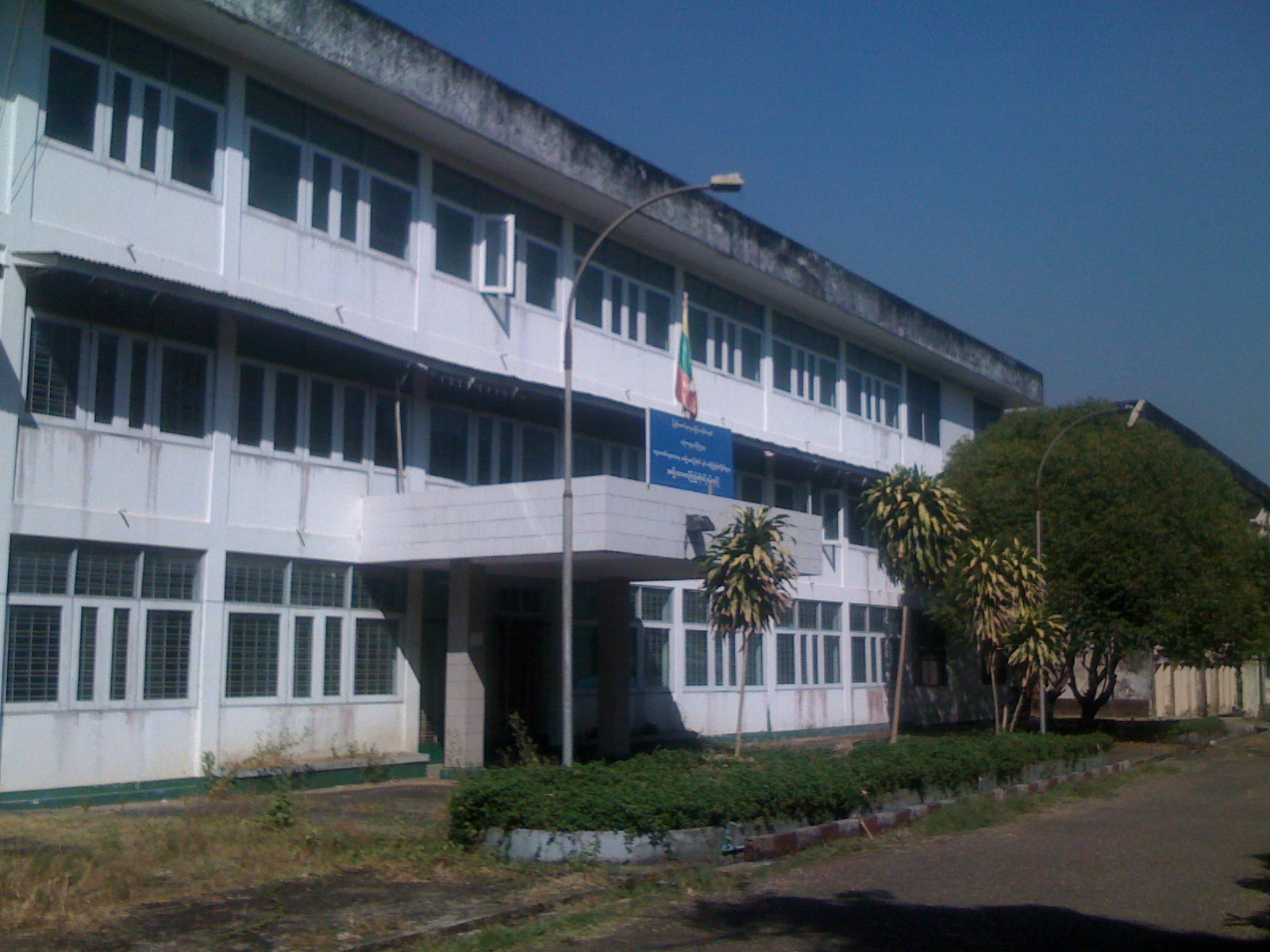
- 19.775166486215134°N 96.14088870886665°E
- Location: 85 Thirimingala Avenue, Yankin, Myanmar
- Type: National library
- Established: 1952 (74 years ago)
- Branches: Two

Collection
- Size: 1.3 Million records (1.2 Million physical records, 0.1 Million digital records)

Access and use
- Population served: 250,000

Other information
- Budget: $1 Million USD per branch ($2 Million total)
- Director: Kay Thi Aye
- Employees: 60 – 120
- Website: www.nlm.gov.mm

The National Library of Myanmar is the national library of Myanmar. The library operates two branches: one in Yankin Township, Yangon, and the other in Naypyidaw.

Established in 1952, the National Library, along with Universities' Central Library, is one of only two research libraries in Yangon. The library houses more than 220,000 books, divided into 10 sections.

The National Library's Yangon branch collection used to have about 618,000 books and periodicals as well as 15,800 rare and valuable manuscripts. However, in 2006, the military government announced a plan to move a large part of its collection to a new National Library in Nay Pyi Taw, and to auction off its 8-story building and 10-acre (4.0 ha) lot in Tamwe Township. In October 2008, the National Library's Yangon Branch was moved to its current location in Yankin Township.

The library's current collection of ancient Burmese texts includes 16,066 palm-leaf manuscripts, 1972 parabaik (folded writing tablets made of paper, cloth or metal), and 345 handwritten scripts of famous writers. The library's preservation and conservation section, established in 1993, regularly maintains rare Burmese manuscripts. The library plans to offer an online catalogue.

The National Library is a member of the International Federation of Library Associations and Institutions and National Libraries Group-Southeast Asia.

== History ==
The National Library originated from the Bernard Free Library, which opened in 1883 during the British colonial era. The Bernard Library was renamed the State Library under the management of the Ministry of Culture in 1952, and changed its name to the National Library in 1967. The library was first located in the Jubilee Hall building, then moved to Pansodan Road, then relocated to its penultimate home in Tamwe, and finally moved to its present location in Yankin in October 2008.
