= Soe Myint =

Burmese politician

Thakin Soe Myint
- သခင် စိုးမြင့်
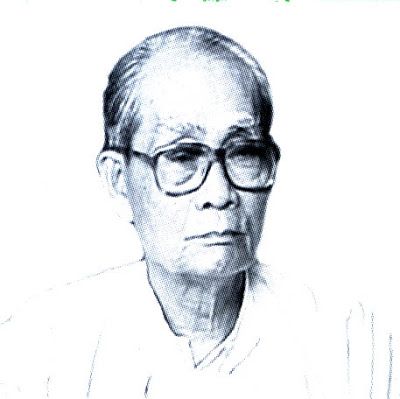
- Tha Khin Soe Myint

Member-elect of the Pyithu Hluttaw
- Preceded by: Constituency established
- Succeeded by: Constituency abolished
- Constituency: South Okkalapa Township
- Majority: 33,959 (72%)

Personal details
- Born: 16 August 1923 Myaungmya, Irrawaddy Province, British Burma
- Died: 20 May 2010 (aged 86) South Okkalapa Township, Yangon, Myanmar
- Cause of death: Heart disease
- Resting place: Yayway Cemetery, Yangon
- Party: National League for Democracy
- Spouse: Aye Kywe
- Children: Swe Swe Myint; Maung Maung Myint; Thit Thit Myint; Cho Cho Myint; Thin Thin Myint
- Parent: Shein
- Occupation: Politician

Thakin Soe Myint (Burmese: သခင် စိုးမြင့်) was a Burmese politician and a leader of the National League for Democracy. Born in the Irrawaddy delta region in 1923, he first entered politics by joining the Dobama Asiayone branch at Myaungmya Township. He was a member of several political parties, including the People's Revolutionary Party, Myaungmya District Socialist Party, Anti-Fascist People's Freedom League, Socialist Party and People's Youth League. Most recently, he served as a member of the National League for Democracy's Central Executive Committee, joining in 1988, during the 8888 Uprising.

He died at his home in Yangon's South Okkalapa Township on 20 May 2010, of a heart attack. Soe Myint was cremated at Yangon's Yayway Cemetery on 22 May 2010.
