= Choritrohin =

Book by Sharat Chandra Chattopadhyay

Debauched
- Author: Sarat Chandra Chattopadhyay
- Original title: Choritrohin
- Language: Bengali
- Publication date: 1917
- Publication place: India

Choritrohin (English: Debauched) is a 1917 novel by Bengali novelist Sarat Chandra Chattopadhyay. It tells a story of Sabitri, a beautiful (subjective) woman and widow, who has been thrown out from her husband's home by her in-laws driven to work as a maidservant in a youth hostel, where she falls in love with her master. With a publication of this novel Chattopadhyay established himself as a supporter of women's rights.

== Plot summary ==
The novel is set in Bengali society of the early 1900s. The story has four main women characters–two major, Savitri and Kiranmayi, and two minor, Surbala and Sarojini. The former two are accused of being charitraheen (promiscuous or sexually depraved). It is most interesting that all four characters are totally different.

Savitri is born a Brahmin. For the act of deceit by one of her own relatives she was forced to make a living as a maid servant, doing tasks appropriate only for a 'depraved woman' albeit it is established in the novel that she has been, and remains, pure of character, and devoted to the man she loves – Satish. Surbala is Upendranath's wife. She is young, pure in character and pious to the point of blind faith in religious texts. Sarojini is educated in the Western style, and is forward-thinking, but hampered by familial circumstances and an overbearing mother. Kiranmayi is the most striking character of the novel. She is that element of the novel that has deep psychological crisis. A paragon of beauty, Kiranmayi is very skeptic, argumentative and quite a rebel in herself. Her emotions and desires have, however, always been repressed by a husband more intent on teaching her than on conjugal matters, and by a nagging mother-in-law. She surprises and impresses all the three main men in the novel – Satish, Upendra and Dibakar – but ultimately her life gets reduced to shambles as her extreme pride and the ghosts of unfulfilled desires wreak havoc on her causing to go insane.

The three men play very important roles in the lives of the four women, but most of the time, their actions are detrimental to the women. They are orthodox, unable to fathom the complexity of women, and are seen hardly in control of their emotions. Satish and Savitri share a strange relationship where none dares to express their feelings to each other and this act of hide-and-seek, this element of mist in their relationship creates a devastating counter-effect when both of them are blamed of being depraved, forcing Savitri to leave Kolkata and take refuge in Varanasi. Losing Savitri, Satish suffers intolerable pain and though his physique shows no marks of injury his heart knew no peace. At this point Kiranmayi and Sarojini enter his life, the former as an influential sister-in-law ("bouthan(বৌঠান)") and the latter as a character who fall deeply in love with him. The relationship of Satish and Sarojini is filled with ambiguity as both of them at some point of the story feel either attracted or repelled from each other as the story unfolds and even in the end it is left unclear as to whether he marries Sarojini or not, though Upendra in his deathbed advocates for the very same. Upendra helps Kiranmayi initially, but thinks the worst of her relationship with Dibakar which in turn causes Kiranmayi's impulsive elopement with Dibakar. Dibakar is almost an adolescent boy, hardly out of his teenage years, and fails to see the trickeries of Kiranmayi. An orphan, he is delighted by Kiranmayi treating him as her brother and eventually shirks education but gradually attracted by her unearthly beauty develops the vague idea of love between them and for this of his immature and illogical interpretation he pays a heavy price but ultimately he gets redeemed in the climax. He acts totally irresponsibly after his elopement with Kiranmayi.

There is a redemption of all the women in the end, Savitri being considered a devi, Kiranmayi's compulsions understood somewhat and her ill-treatment regretted implicitly, Sarojini getting a promise of marriage with Satish, and Surbala becoming the saviour and eye opener for of both Satish and Upendra.

The depiction of orthodox Hindu society in conflict with Western thoughts brought in by the British is both realistic and relatable considering the premise of the novel, Kolkata in nineteenth century.

== Adaptation ==
A television series titled Charitraheen which was based on the novel aired on DD National, the national public broadcaster of India, in the 1982. Another Bengali web-series have been made in 2018 starring Swastika Mukherjee.
