= Bernard Free Library =

Burmese public library

- 16.781094583518072°N 96.15222711506927°E
- Location: Myanmar
- Established: 1883

The Bernard Free Library was the first free public library in Burma (now Myanmar), and a direct predecessor to the National Library of Myanmar.

== History ==
The Bernard Free Library was established on 21 February 1883 when the Commissioner of Lower Myanmar (Lower Burma), Sir Charles Edward Bernard opened a library, with his collection of books, pre-colonial historical manuscripts, and literary works, in the centre of Rangoon (presently No 1 Basic Education High School, Latha Township).

During the Second World War, the Library was damaged but many books and almost all manuscripts were saved. In 1952, the Library was transferred to the Burmese government, and moved to the Jubilee Hall on the Shwedagon Pagoda Road and was reopened as the National Library of Myanmar under the Ministry of Culture. The library is the legal depository of Myanmar, under the Printers and Publishers Registration Act 1962.
