= South Okkalapa Township =

Township of Yangon, Myanmar

South Okkalapa Township တောင်ဥက္ကလာပ မြို့နယ်
- Township of Yangon
- South Okkalapa Township
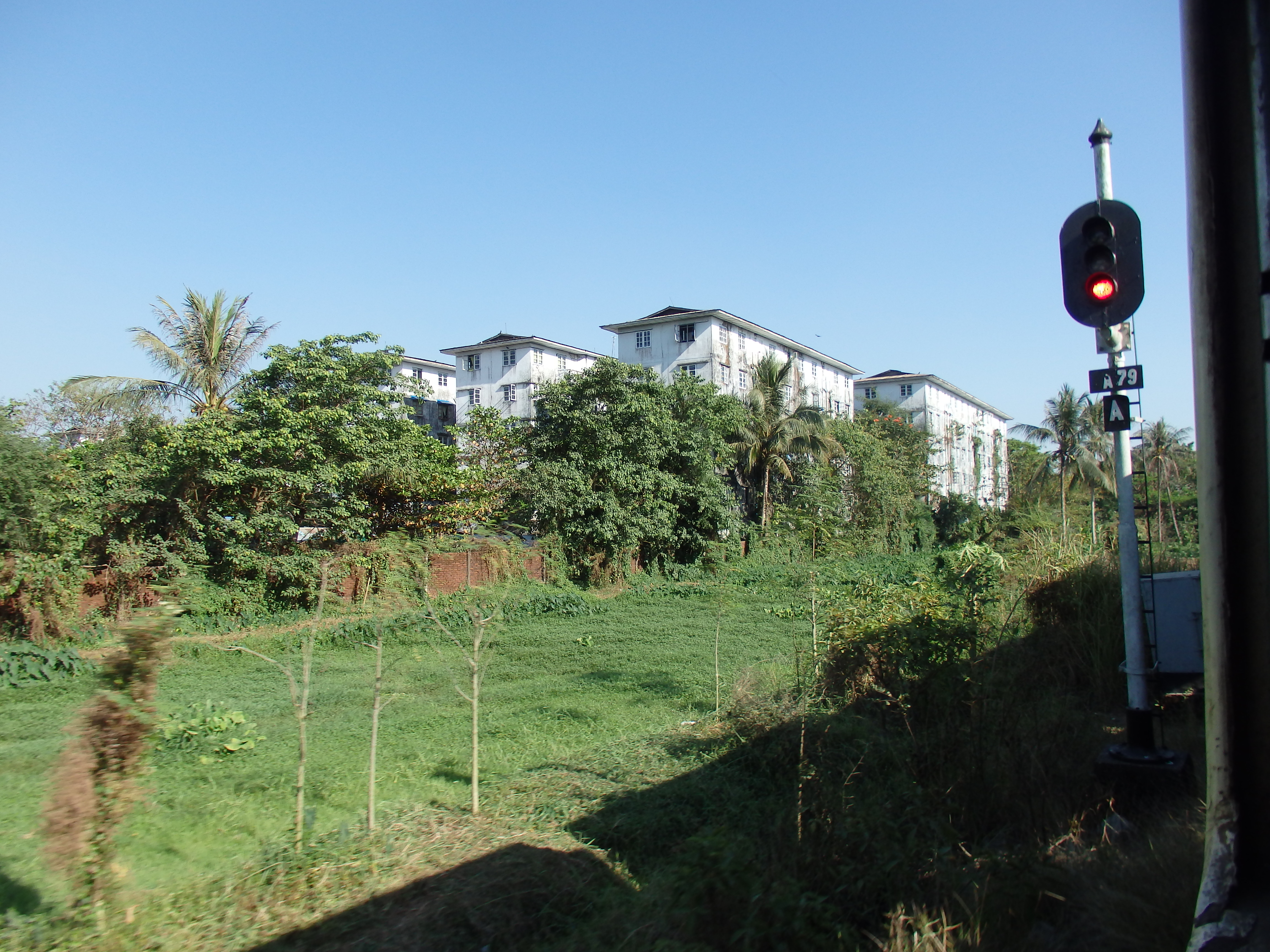
- Housing Complex near Parami Station

- Location within Myanmar
- Coordinates: 16°50′46″N 96°10′46″E
- Country: Myanmar
- Region: Yangon Region
- City: Yangon
- District: Thingangyun District
- Settled: 1959

Area
  - Total: 7.70 km^{2} (2.973 sq mi)

Population (2000)
  - Total: 193,354
  - Density: 25,110/km^{2} (65,040/sq mi)
- Time zone: UTC6:30 (MST)
- Postal codes: 11091
- Area codes: 1 (mobile: 80, 99)

South Okkalapa Township (Burmese: တောင်ဥက္ကလာပ မြို့နယ် [tàʊɰ̃ ʔoʊʔkəlàpa̰ mjo̰nɛ̀]) is located in the eastern part of Yangon. The township comprises 15 wards, and shares borders with North Okkalapa Township in the north, North Dagon Township in the east, Yankin Township in the west and Thingangyun Township in the south. South Okkalapa was one of the satellite towns established in 1959. Today, it is a firmly established part of the city, albeit with nominal access to the city's electricity grid and sewer system.

== Education ==
The township has 32 primary schools, nine middle schools and five high schools.

== Health ==
The North Okkalapa General Hospital, an affiliated teaching hospital of the University of Medicine 2, Yangon serves South Okkalapa as well. The South Okkalapa Women's and Children's Hospital is a major specialized hospital in the city.
