= Social Security Board (Myanmar) =

Government agency of Myanmar

- လူမှုဖူလုံရေးအဖွဲ့

Agency overview
- Type: Statutory Board
- Jurisdiction: Burma (Myanmar)
- Headquarters: Naypyidaw
- Agency executive: Yu Aung Lwin
- Parent agency: Ministry of Labour
- Website: www.ssbmyanmar.gov.mm www.mol.gov.mm/en/departments/social-security-board/

The Social Security Board (Burmese: လူမှုဖူလုံရေးအဖွဲ့; abbreviated SSB) administers Myanmar's social security programs, including benefits and contributions. SSB provides social security programs for public employees, including members of the civil service, state boards, state corporations, municipal authorities and military personnel, as well as employees in limited private sector industries, including commerce, railways, ports, mines and oilfields. The board operates three hospitals and 92 social security clinics. The Social Security Board is under the purview of the Ministry of Labour.

SSB was established under the Social Security Act of 1954, which implemented a social security scheme covering employees working for firms employing over 5 employees, including state-owned, private, foreign and joint ventures. The social security scheme is contributory, with 2.5% of contributions coming from the employer, 1.5% by the employee, and a capital investment by the government. On 31 August 2012, the Pyidaungsu Hluttaw enacted the Social Security Law of 2012, which introduced benefit systems for invalids, the elderly, survivors and unemployed individuals.
