= List of fiction works made into feature films (K–R) =

This is a list of works of fiction that have been made into feature films, from K to R. The title of the work and the year it was published are both followed by the work's author, the title of the film, and the year of the film. If a film has an alternate title based on geographical distribution, the title listed will be that of the widest distribution area.

== K ==
Fiction work(s)	Film adaptation(s)
Kami no Tsuki (2012), Mitsuyo Kakuta	Pale Moon (2014)
Kenka erejii (1963), Takashi Suzuki	Fighting Elegy (1966)
The Key (鍵, Kagi) (1956), Jun'ichirō Tanizaki	Odd Obsession (1959)
The Key (鍵, Kagi) (1956), Jun'ichirō Tanizaki	The Key (Italian: La chiave) (1983)
The Key (鍵, Kagi) (1956), Jun'ichirō Tanizaki	The Key (2014)
The Keys of the Kingdom (1941), A. J. Cronin	The Keys of the Kingdom (1944)
Kidnapped (1886), Robert Louis Stevenson	Kidnapped (1917)
Kidnapped (1886), Robert Louis Stevenson	Kidnapped (1938)
Kidnapped (1886), Robert Louis Stevenson	Kidnapped (1960)
Kidnapped (1886), Robert Louis Stevenson	Kidnapped (1971) (Note: Conflated with the first half of another work Catriona (1893) by the same author.)
Kidnapped (1886), Robert Louis Stevenson	Kidnapped (1986)
Kidnapped (1886), Robert Louis Stevenson	Kidnapped (1995)
King Solomon's Mines (1885), Sir H. Rider Haggard	Allan Quatermain (1919)
King Solomon's Mines (1885), Sir H. Rider Haggard	King Solomon's Mines (1937)
King Solomon's Mines (1885), Sir H. Rider Haggard	King Solomon's Mines (1950)
King Solomon's Mines (1885), Sir H. Rider Haggard	Watusi (1959)
King Solomon's Mines (1885), Sir H. Rider Haggard	King Solomon's Treasure (1979)
King Solomon's Mines (1885), Sir H. Rider Haggard	King Solomon's Mines (1985)
King Solomon's Mines (1885), Sir H. Rider Haggard	Allan Quatermain and the Lost City of Gold (1986) (Note: Film adapted from the sequel novel Allan Quatermain (1887) by the same author.)
King Solomon's Mines (1885), Sir H. Rider Haggard	King Solomon's Mines (1986)
King Solomon's Mines (1885), Sir H. Rider Haggard	Allan Quatermain and the Temple of Skulls (2008)
King Solomon's Mines (1885), Sir H. Rider Haggard	Allan Quatermain and the Spear of Destiny (2023)
The King's Damosel (1976), Vera Chapman	Quest for Camelot (1998)
King's Ransom (1959), Evan Hunter (Note: Written as Ed McBain.)	High and Low (1963)
Kings Go Forth (1956), Joe David Brown	Kings Go Forth (1958)
Kings Row (1940), Henry Bellamann	Kings Row (1942)
The Killer Angels (1974), Michael Shaara	Gettysburg (1993)
The Killer Inside Me (1952), Jim Thompson	The Killer Inside Me (1976)
The Killer Inside Me (1952), Jim Thompson	The Killer Inside Me (2010)
Kipps (1905), H. G. Wells	Kipps (1921)
Kipps (1905), H. G. Wells	Kipps (1941)
Kipps (1905), H. G. Wells	Half a Sixpence (1967)
Kirishima, bukatsu yamerutteyo (2010), Ryo Asai	The Kirishima Thing (2012)
Kiss of the Spider Woman (1976), Manuel Puig	Kiss of the Spider Woman (1985)
Kiss the Girls (1995), James Patterson	Kiss the Girls (1997)
Kiss Tomorrow Goodbye (1948), Horace McCoy	Kiss Tomorrow Goodbye (1950)
Kitchen (キッチン, Kitchin) (1988), Banana Yoshimoto	Kitchen (1989)
Kitchen (キッチン, Kitchin) (1988), Banana Yoshimoto	Kitchen (Chinese: 我愛廚房; pinyin: Wo ai chu fang) (1997)
The Kites (French: Les Cerfs-volants) (1980), Romain Gary	Les cerfs-volants (2007) (Note: Television film.)
The Klansman (1967), William Bradford Huie	The Klansman (1974)
Kokoro (こころ) (1914), Natsume Sōseki	The Heart (1955)
Kokoro (こころ) (1914), Natsume Sōseki	The Heart (1973)
The Kolchak Papers (written 1970, published 1973), Jeff Rice	The Night Stalker (1972)
The Kolchak Papers (written 1970, published 1973), Jeff Rice	The Night Strangler (1973)
The Kolchak Papers (written 1970, published 1973), Jeff Rice	Crackle of Death (1974)
The Kolchak Papers (written 1970, published 1973), Jeff Rice	The Demon and the Mummy (1976)
Kowloon Tong (1997), Paul Theroux	Chinese Box (1997)

== L ==
Fiction work(s)	Film adaptation(s)
L.A. Confidential (1990), James Ellroy	L.A. Confidential (1997)
Lad, A Dog (1919), Albert Payson Terhune	Lad, A Dog (1963)
Lady Audley's Secret (1862), Mary Elizabeth Braddon	Lady Audley's Secret (1912)
Lady Audley's Secret (1862), Mary Elizabeth Braddon	Lady Audley's Secret (a. k. a. Secrets of Society) (1915)
Lady Audley's Secret (1862), Mary Elizabeth Braddon	Lady Audley's Secret (1920)
Lady Audley's Secret (1862), Mary Elizabeth Braddon	Lady Audley's Secret (2000)
The Lady in Cement (1961), Marvin H. Albert	Lady in Cement (1968)
Lady L (1958), Romain Gary	Lady L (1965)
The Lady of the Camellias (French: La Dame aux Camélias) (1848), Alexandre Dumas, fils	Camille (1909)
The Lady of the Camellias (French: La Dame aux Camélias) (1848), Alexandre Dumas, fils	The Lady of the Camellias (1912)
The Lady of the Camellias (French: La Dame aux Camélias) (1848), Alexandre Dumas, fils	The Lady of the Camellias (1915; made by Baldassarre Negroni)
The Lady of the Camellias (French: La Dame aux Camélias) (1848), Alexandre Dumas, fils	The Lady of the Camellias (1915; made by Gustavo Serena)
The Lady of the Camellias (French: La Dame aux Camélias) (1848), Alexandre Dumas, fils	Camille (1915)
The Lady of the Camellias (French: La Dame aux Camélias) (1848), Alexandre Dumas, fils	Camille (1917)
The Lady of the Camellias (French: La Dame aux Camélias) (1848), Alexandre Dumas, fils	Prima Vera (German: Die Kameliendame) (1917)
The Lady of the Camellias (French: La Dame aux Camélias) (1848), Alexandre Dumas, fils	The Red Peacock (German: Arme Violetta) (1920)
The Lady of the Camellias (French: La Dame aux Camélias) (1848), Alexandre Dumas, fils	Camille (1921)
The Lady of the Camellias (French: La Dame aux Camélias) (1848), Alexandre Dumas, fils	The Lady of the Camellias (Swedish: Damen med kameliorna) (1925)
The Lady of the Camellias (French: La Dame aux Camélias) (1848), Alexandre Dumas, fils	Camille (1926; made by Norma Talmadge)
The Lady of the Camellias (French: La Dame aux Camélias) (1848), Alexandre Dumas, fils	Camille (1926; made by Ralph Barton, and starring Charlie Chaplin)
The Lady of the Camellias (French: La Dame aux Camélias) (1848), Alexandre Dumas, fils	The Lady of the Camellias (1934)
The Lady of the Camellias (French: La Dame aux Camélias) (1848), Alexandre Dumas, fils	Camille (1936)
The Lady of the Camellias (French: La Dame aux Camélias) (1848), Alexandre Dumas, fils	The Lady of the Camellias (Italian: La signora dalle camelie) (1947)
The Lady of the Camellias (French: La Dame aux Camélias) (1848), Alexandre Dumas, fils	Traviata '53 (1953)
The Lady of the Camellias (French: La Dame aux Camélias) (1848), Alexandre Dumas, fils	The Lady of the Camellias (1953)
The Lady of the Camellias (French: La Dame aux Camélias) (1848), Alexandre Dumas, fils	Camelia (1954)
The Lady of the Camellias (French: La Dame aux Camélias) (1848), Alexandre Dumas, fils	Camille 2000 (1969)
The Lady of the Camellias (French: La Dame aux Camélias) (1848), Alexandre Dumas, fils	The Lady of the Camellias (1981)
The Lady of the Camellias (French: La Dame aux Camélias) (1848), Alexandre Dumas, fils	Camille (1984)
The Lady of the Camellias (French: La Dame aux Camélias) (1848), Alexandre Dumas, fils	The Lady of the Camellias (Polish: Dama kameliowa) (1994)
The Lair of the White Worm (1911), Bram Stoker	The Lair of the White Worm (1988)
La lampe dans la fenêtre (1972), Pauline Cadieux	Cordélia (1980)
The Land That Time Forgot (1918), Edgar Rice Burroughs	The Land That Time Forgot (1975)
The Land That Time Forgot (1918), Edgar Rice Burroughs	The People That Time Forgot (1977) (Note: Sequel film; adapted from the sequel novel The People That Time Forgot (1918) by the same author.)
The Land That Time Forgot (1918), Edgar Rice Burroughs	The Land That Time Forgot (2009)
The Land That Time Forgot (1918), Edgar Rice Burroughs	The Land That Time Forgot (2025)
The Lands of Risk (Portuguese: As Terras Do Risco) (1994), Agustina Bessa-Luís	The Convent (1995)
Lassie Come-Home (1940), Eric Knight	Lassie Come Home (1943)
Lassie Come-Home (1940), Eric Knight	Son of Lassie (1945)
Lassie Come-Home (1940), Eric Knight	Courage of Lassie (1946)
Lassie Come-Home (1940), Eric Knight	Hills of Home (1948)
Lassie Come-Home (1940), Eric Knight	The Sun Comes Up (1949)
Lassie Come-Home (1940), Eric Knight	Challenge to Lassie (1950)
Lassie Come-Home (1940), Eric Knight	The Painted Hills (1951)
Lassie Come-Home (1940), Eric Knight	Lassie's Great Adventure (1963)
Lassie Come-Home (1940), Eric Knight	Lassie and the Spirit of Thunder Mountain (1972)
Lassie Come-Home (1940), Eric Knight	The Magic of Lassie (1978)
Lassie Come-Home (1940), Eric Knight	Lassie: The New Beginning (1978)
Lassie Come-Home (1940), Eric Knight	Lassie (1994)
Lassie Come-Home (1940), Eric Knight	Lassie (2005)
Lassie Come-Home (1940), Eric Knight	Lassie Come Home (2020)
Lassie Come-Home (1940), Eric Knight	Lassie: A New Adventure (German: Lassie – Ein neues Abenteuer) (2023)
The Last Days of Pompeii (1834), Edward Bulwer-Lytton	The Last Days of Pompeii (Italian: Gli ultimi giorni di Pompei) (1913)
The Last Days of Pompeii (1834), Edward Bulwer-Lytton	Jone or the Last Days of Pompeii (Italian: Ione o gli ultimi giorni di Pompei) (1913)
The Last Days of Pompeii (1834), Edward Bulwer-Lytton	The Last Days of Pompeii (1926)
The Last Days of Pompeii (1834), Edward Bulwer-Lytton	The Last Days of Pompeii (1935)
The Last Days of Pompeii (1834), Edward Bulwer-Lytton	The Last Days of Pompeii (French: Les Derniers Jours de Pompéi) (1950)
The Last Days of Pompeii (1834), Edward Bulwer-Lytton	The Last Days of Pompeii (1959)
The Last Detail (1970), Darryl Ponicsan	The Last Detail (1973)
The Last Hunt (1954), Milton Lott	The Last Hunt (1956)
Last of the Curlews (1954), Fred Bodsworth	Last of the Curlews (1972)
The Last of the Duanes (written 1913, published 1996), Zane Grey	The Last of the Duanes (1919)
The Last of the Duanes (written 1913, published 1996), Zane Grey	The Last of the Duanes (1924)
The Last of the Duanes (written 1913, published 1996), Zane Grey	The Last of the Duanes (1930)
The Last of the Duanes (written 1913, published 1996), Zane Grey	El último de los Vargas (1930)
The Last of the Duanes (written 1913, published 1996), Zane Grey	Last of the Duanes (1941)
The Last of the Mohicans (1826), James Fenimore Cooper	The Last of the Mohicans (1911)
The Last of the Mohicans (1826), James Fenimore Cooper	The Last of the Mohicans (1920; American)
The Last of the Mohicans (1826), James Fenimore Cooper	The Last of the Mohicans (German: Der Letzte der Mohikaner) (1920; Germany)
The Last of the Mohicans (1826), James Fenimore Cooper	The Last of the Mohicans (1932) (Note: Serial film.)
The Last of the Mohicans (1826), James Fenimore Cooper	The Last of the Mohicans (1936)
The Last of the Mohicans (1826), James Fenimore Cooper	Last of the Redskins (1947)
The Last of the Mohicans (1826), James Fenimore Cooper	The Iroquois Trail (1950)
The Last of the Mohicans (1826), James Fenimore Cooper	Fall of the Mohicans (Spanish: Uncas, el fin de una raza, Italian: L'ultimo dei Mohicani) (1965)
The Last of the Mohicans (1826), James Fenimore Cooper	The Last Tomahawk (German: Der letzte Mohikaner) (1965)
The Last of the Mohicans (1826), James Fenimore Cooper	The Last of the Mohicans (Romanian: Ultimul mohican) (1968)
The Last of the Mohicans (1826), James Fenimore Cooper	Last of the Mohicans (1977)
The Last of the Mohicans (1826), James Fenimore Cooper	The Last of the Mohicans (1987)
The Last of the Mohicans (1826), James Fenimore Cooper	The Last of the Mohicans (1992)
The Last Picture Show (1966), Larry McMurtry	The Last Picture Show (1971)
The Last Ride (1996), Thomas Eidson	The Missing (2003)
The Last Song (2009), Nicholas Sparks	The Last Song (2010)
Last Stand at Papago Wells (1957), Louis L'Amour	Apache Territory (1958)
Last Stand at Saber River (1959), Elmore Leonard	Last Stand at Saber River (1997)
The Last Thing He Wanted (1996), Joan Didion	The Last Thing He Wanted (2020)
The Last Unicorn (1968), Peter S. Beagle	The Last Unicorn (1982)
The Late George Apley (1937), John P. Marquand	The Late George Apley (1947)
The Laughing Cavalier (1913), Baroness Orczy	The Laughing Cavalier (1917)
Laura (serialised 1942, published as a book 1943), Vera Caspary	Laura (1944)
Laura (serialised 1942, published as a book 1943), Vera Caspary	Laura (1968)
Law and Order (1973), Dorothy Uhnak	Law and Order (1976)
The Law at Randado (1954), Elmore Leonard	Border Shootout (1990)
Law Man (1955), Lauran Paine	The Quiet Gun (1957)
Lawyer Man (1932), Max Trell	Lawyer Man (1933)
Lay This Laurel (1973), Lincoln Kirstein	Glory (1989)
Layer Cake (2000), J. J. Connolly	Layer Cake (2004)
Leaving Cheyenne (1963), Larry McMurtry	Lovin' Molly (1974)
The Ledger (1970), Dorothy Uhnak	Get Christie Love! (1974)
Left Behind (1995–2007) (series), Tim LaHaye and Jerry B. Jenkins	Left Behind: The Movie (2000) (Note: Direct-to-video film.) (Note: Left Behind (film series))
Left Behind (1995–2007) (series), Tim LaHaye and Jerry B. Jenkins	Left Behind II: Tribulation Force (2002)
Left Behind (1995–2007) (series), Tim LaHaye and Jerry B. Jenkins	Left Behind: World at War (2005)
Left Behind (1995–2007) (series), Tim LaHaye and Jerry B. Jenkins	Left Behind (2014)
Left Behind (1995–2007) (series), Tim LaHaye and Jerry B. Jenkins	Vanished – Left Behind: Next Generation (2016) (Note: Spin-off film.)
Left Behind (1995–2007) (series), Tim LaHaye and Jerry B. Jenkins	Left Behind: Rise of the Antichrist (2023) (Note: Sequel to the 2014 film.)
The Legend of the Condor Heroes (Chinese: 射鵰英雄傳, Shè Diāo Yīng Xióng Zhuàn) (1957–1959), Jin Yong	Story of the Vulture Conqueror (Chinese: 射鵰英雄傳) (1958–1959)
The Legend of the Condor Heroes (Chinese: 射鵰英雄傳, Shè Diāo Yīng Xióng Zhuàn) (1957–1959), Jin Yong	The Brave Archer (1977)
The Legend of the Condor Heroes (Chinese: 射鵰英雄傳, Shè Diāo Yīng Xióng Zhuàn) (1957–1959), Jin Yong	The Brave Archer 2 (1978)
The Legend of the Condor Heroes (Chinese: 射鵰英雄傳, Shè Diāo Yīng Xióng Zhuàn) (1957–1959), Jin Yong	The Brave Archer 3 (1981)
The Legend of the Condor Heroes (Chinese: 射鵰英雄傳, Shè Diāo Yīng Xióng Zhuàn) (1957–1959), Jin Yong	The Brave Archer and His Mate (1982)
The Legend of the Condor Heroes (Chinese: 射鵰英雄傳, Shè Diāo Yīng Xióng Zhuàn) (1957–1959), Jin Yong	The Eagle Shooting Heroes (Chinese: 射鵰英雄傳之東成西就, Se diu ying hung ji dung sing sai jau) (1993)
The Legend of the Condor Heroes (Chinese: 射鵰英雄傳, Shè Diāo Yīng Xióng Zhuàn) (1957–1959), Jin Yong	Ashes of Time (Chinese: 東邪西毒, Dongxié Xidú) (1994)
Legend of the Galactic Heroes (Japanese: 銀河英雄伝説, Hepburn: Ginga Eiyū Densetsu) (1982–1987), Yoshiki Tanaka	Legend of the Galactic Heroes: My Conquest is the Sea of Stars (1988)
Legend of the Galactic Heroes (Japanese: 銀河英雄伝説, Hepburn: Ginga Eiyū Densetsu) (1982–1987), Yoshiki Tanaka	Legend of the Galactic Heroes: Golden Wings (1992)
Legend of the Galactic Heroes (Japanese: 銀河英雄伝説, Hepburn: Ginga Eiyū Densetsu) (1982–1987), Yoshiki Tanaka	Legend of the Galactic Heroes: Overture to a New War (1993)
Legend of the Galactic Heroes (Japanese: 銀河英雄伝説, Hepburn: Ginga Eiyū Densetsu) (1982–1987), Yoshiki Tanaka	Legend of the Galactic Heroes: Die Neue These - Stellar War (2019)
Legend of the Galactic Heroes (Japanese: 銀河英雄伝説, Hepburn: Ginga Eiyū Densetsu) (1982–1987), Yoshiki Tanaka	Legend of the Galactic Heroes: Die Neue These - Clash (2021)
Legend of the Galactic Heroes (Japanese: 銀河英雄伝説, Hepburn: Ginga Eiyū Densetsu) (1982–1987), Yoshiki Tanaka	Legend of the Galactic Heroes: Die Neue These - Intrigue (2022)
Legion (1983), William Peter Blatty	The Exorcist III (1990)
Lemonade Mouth (2007), Mark Peter Hughes	Lemonade Mouth (2011)
The Leopard (1958), Giuseppe Tomasi di Lampedusa	The Leopard (1963)
Less than Zero (1985), Bret Easton Ellis	Less than Zero (1987)
Let Me Count the Ways (1965), Peter De Vries	How Do I Love Thee? (1970)
Let the Right One In (Swedish: Låt den rätte komma in) (2004), John Ajvide Lindqvist	Let the Right One In (2008)
Let the Right One In (Swedish: Låt den rätte komma in) (2004), John Ajvide Lindqvist	Let Me In (2010)
A Letter to Five Wives (1945), John Klempner	A Letter to Three Wives (1949)
A Letter to Five Wives (1945), John Klempner	A Letter to Three Wives (1985)
The Life and Opinions of Tristram Shandy, Gentleman (1759–1767), Laurence Sterne	A Cock and Bull Story (2006)
The Life Before Us (French: La vie devant soi) (1975), Romain Gary (as Émile Ajar)	Madame Rosa (1977)
The Life Before Us (French: La vie devant soi) (1975), Romain Gary (as Émile Ajar)	The Life Before Us (2010)
The Life Before Us (French: La vie devant soi) (1975), Romain Gary (as Émile Ajar)	The Life Ahead (2020)
Life of Pi (2001), Yann Martel	Life of Pi (2012)
Lift to the Scaffold (French: Ascenseur pour l'échafaud) (1956), Noël Calef	Elevator to the Gallows (1958)
The Light in the Forest (1953), Conrad Richter	The Light in the Forest (1958)
The Light of Western Stars (1914), Zane Grey	The Light of Western Stars (1918)
The Light of Western Stars (1914), Zane Grey	The Light of Western Stars (1925)
The Light of Western Stars (1914), Zane Grey	The Light of Western Stars (1930)
The Light of Western Stars (1914), Zane Grey	The Light of Western Stars (1940)
Like a Fire is Burning (1991), Gerald N. Lund	The Work and the Glory: American Zion (2005)
Like Water for Chocolate (Spanish: Como agua para chocolate) (1989), Laura Esquivel	Like Water for Chocolate (1992)
The Lincoln Lawyer (2005), Michael Connelly	The Lincoln Lawyer (2011)
A Lion Is in the Streets (1945), Adria Locke Langley	A Lion Is in the Streets (1953)
Lisa and Lottie (German: Das doppelte Lottchen) (1949), Erich Kästner	Two Times Lotte (1950)
Lisa and Lottie (German: Das doppelte Lottchen) (1949), Erich Kästner	Hibari's Lullaby (ひばりの子守唄, Hibari no komoriuta) (1951)
Lisa and Lottie (German: Das doppelte Lottchen) (1949), Erich Kästner	Twice Upon a Time (1953)
Lisa and Lottie (German: Das doppelte Lottchen) (1949), Erich Kästner	The Parent Trap (1961) (Note: The Parent Trap (film series))
Lisa and Lottie (German: Das doppelte Lottchen) (1949), Erich Kästner	Kuzhandaiyum Deivamum (1965)
Lisa and Lottie (German: Das doppelte Lottchen) (1949), Erich Kästner	Leta Manasulu (1966)
Lisa and Lottie (German: Das doppelte Lottchen) (1949), Erich Kästner	Do Kaliyaan (1968)
Lisa and Lottie (German: Das doppelte Lottchen) (1949), Erich Kästner	Cheeky Little Angels (Korean: 개구장이 천사들, Gaegujangi Cheonsadeul) (1980)
Lisa and Lottie (German: Das doppelte Lottchen) (1949), Erich Kästner	Pyaar Ke Do Pal (1986)
Lisa and Lottie (German: Das doppelte Lottchen) (1949), Erich Kästner	The Parent Trap II (1987)
Lisa and Lottie (German: Das doppelte Lottchen) (1949), Erich Kästner	Parent Trap III (1988)
Lisa and Lottie (German: Das doppelte Lottchen) (1949), Erich Kästner	Parent Trap: Hawaiian Honeymoon (1989)
Lisa and Lottie (German: Das doppelte Lottchen) (1949), Erich Kästner	Charlie & Louise – Das doppelte Lottchen (1994)
Lisa and Lottie (German: Das doppelte Lottchen) (1949), Erich Kästner	Dvynukės (1994)
Lisa and Lottie (German: Das doppelte Lottchen) (1949), Erich Kästner	Strange Sisters (خواهران غریب) (1995)
Lisa and Lottie (German: Das doppelte Lottchen) (1949), Erich Kästner	The Parent Trap (1998) (Note: Remake of the Disney film.)
Lisa and Lottie (German: Das doppelte Lottchen) (1949), Erich Kästner	Kuch Khatti Kuch Meethi (2001)
Lisa and Lottie (German: Das doppelte Lottchen) (1949), Erich Kästner	Tur & retur (2003)
Lisa and Lottie (German: Das doppelte Lottchen) (1949), Erich Kästner	Two Times Lotte (2007)
Lisa and Lottie (German: Das doppelte Lottchen) (1949), Erich Kästner	Das doppelte Lottchen (2017)
Little Caesar (1929), W. R. Burnett	Little Caesar (1931)
Little Caesar (1929), W. R. Burnett	Black Caesar (1973)
Little Caesar (1929), W. R. Burnett	Hell Up in Harlem (1973)
Little Dorrit (serialised 1855–1857, published as a book 1857), Charles Dickens	Little Dorrit (1913)
Little Dorrit (serialised 1855–1857, published as a book 1857), Charles Dickens	Little Dorrit (1920)
Little Dorrit (serialised 1855–1857, published as a book 1857), Charles Dickens	Little Dorrit (German: Klein Dorrit) (1934)
Little Dorrit (serialised 1855–1857, published as a book 1857), Charles Dickens	Little Dorrit (1987)
The Little Drummer Girl (1983), John le Carré	The Little Drummer Girl (1984)
The Little White Horse (1946), Elizabeth Goudge	The Secret of Moonacre (2009)
Live and Let Die (1954), Ian Fleming	Live and Let Die (1973)
Live Flesh (1986), Ruth Rendell	Live Flesh (Spanish: Carne trémula) (1997)
The Living and the Dead (French: D'entre les morts) (1954), Pierre Boileau and Thomas Narcejac	Vertigo (1958)
The Lizard's Tail (1979), Marc Brandell	The Hand (1981)
Loaded (1995), Christos Tsiolkas	Head On (1998)
Logan's Run (1967), William F. Nolan and George Clayton Johnson	Logan's Run (1976)
Lolita (1955), Vladimir Nabokov	Lolita (1962)
Lolita (1955), Vladimir Nabokov	Lolita (1997)
The Lone Star Ranger (1915), Zane Grey	The Lone Star Ranger (1919)
The Lone Star Ranger (1915), Zane Grey	The Lone Star Ranger (1923)
The Lone Star Ranger (1915), Zane Grey	The Lone Star Ranger (1930)
The Lone Star Ranger (1915), Zane Grey	Lone Star Ranger (1942)
Lonely Castle in the Mirror (かがみの孤城, Kagami no Kojō) (2017), Mizuki Tsujimura	Lonely Castle in the Mirror (2022)
The Long Goodbye (1953), Raymond Chandler	The Long Goodbye (1973)
The Long Walk (1979), Stephen King (Note: Written as Richard Bachman.)	The Long Walk (2025)
Longarm (1978–2006) (series), Lou Cameron (Note: Written as Tabor Evans.)	Longarm (1987)
Looking for Trouble (1941), Virginia Spencer Cowles	Ladies Courageous (1944)
The Looters (1968), John H. Reese	Charley Varrick (1973)
Lord Jim (serialised 1899–1900, published as a book 1900), Joseph Conrad	Lord Jim (1925)
Lord Jim (serialised 1899–1900, published as a book 1900), Joseph Conrad	Lord Jim (1965)
Lord of the Flies (1954), William Golding	Lord of the Flies (1963)
Lord of the Flies (1954), William Golding	Alkitrang dugo (1976)
Lord of the Flies (1954), William Golding	Lord of the Flies (1990)
The Lord of the Rings (1954–1955) (Note: Originally published as three separate volumes: The Fellowship of the Ring (1954), The Two Towers (1954) and The Return of the King (1955).), J. R. R. Tolkien	J. R. R. Tolkien's The Lord of the Rings (1978) (Note: The film covers only the first two volumes of the novel, The Fellowship of the Ring and The Two Towers respectively.)
The Lord of the Rings (1954–1955), J. R. R. Tolkien	The Return of the King (1980) (Note: Sequel to The Hobbit (1977); produced by the studio behind the previous film, Rankin/Bass.)
The Lord of the Rings (1954–1955), J. R. R. Tolkien	The Lord of the Rings: The Fellowship of the Ring (2001) (Note: The Lord of the Rings (film series))
The Lord of the Rings (1954–1955), J. R. R. Tolkien	The Lord of the Rings: The Two Towers (2002)
The Lord of the Rings (1954–1955), J. R. R. Tolkien	The Lord of the Rings: The Return of the King (2003)
The Lord of the Rings (1954–1955), J. R. R. Tolkien	The Lord of the Rings: The War of the Rohirrim (2024) (Note: Prequel film.)
The Lord of the Rings (1954–1955), J. R. R. Tolkien	The Lord of the Rings: The Hunt for Gollum (2027)
The Lords of Discipline (1980), Pat Conroy	The Lords of Discipline (1983)
Lost Horizon (1933), James Hilton	Lost Horizon (1937)
Lost Horizon (1933), James Hilton	Lost Horizon (1973)
The Lost Ones (1961), Donald G. Payne	The Island at the Top of the World (1974)
A Lost Paradise (失楽園, Shitsurakuen) (1997), Junichi Watanabe	Lost Paradise (1997)
The Lost World (1912), Arthur Conan Doyle	The Lost World (1925)
The Lost World (1912), Arthur Conan Doyle	The Lost World (1960)
The Lost World (1912), Arthur Conan Doyle	The Lost World (1992)
The Lost World (1912), Arthur Conan Doyle	Return to the Lost World (1992) (Note: Sequel to the 1992 film.)
The Lost World (1912), Arthur Conan Doyle	The Lost World (1998)
The Lost World (1912), Arthur Conan Doyle	The Lost World (2001)
The Lost World (1912), Arthur Conan Doyle	King of the Lost World (2005)
The Lost World (1995), Michael Crichton	The Lost World: Jurassic Park (1997)
A Love in Germany (German: Eine Liebe in Deutschland) (1978), Rolf Hochhuth	A Love in Germany (1983)
Love Story (1970), Erich Segal	Love Story (1970)
The Loved One (1948), Evelyn Waugh	The Loved One (1965)
The Lovely Bones (2002), Alice Sebold	The Lovely Bones (2009)
The Luck of Barry Lyndon (1844), William Makepeace Thackeray	Barry Lyndon (1975)
The Lucky One (2008), Nicholas Sparks	The Lucky One (2012)
Lydia Bailey (1947), Kenneth Roberts	Lydia Bailey (1952)

== M ==
Fiction work(s)	Film adaptation(s)
MacKenna's Gold (1963), Henry Wilson Allen (Note: Written as Heck Allen.)	Mackenna's Gold (1969)
Madame Doubtfire (1987), Anne Fine	Mrs. Doubtfire (1993)
The Maddening (1987), Andrew Neiderman	The Maddening (1995)
The Magician (1908), W. Somerset Maugham	The Magician (1926)
Magnificent Obsession (1929), Lloyd C. Douglas	Magnificent Obsession (1935)
Magnificent Obsession (1929), Lloyd C. Douglas	Magnificent Obsession (1954)
Make Room! Make Room! (1966), Harry Harrison	Soylent Green (1973)
The Maltese Falcon (1930), Dashiell Hammett	The Maltese Falcon (1931)
The Maltese Falcon (1930), Dashiell Hammett	Satan Met a Lady (1936)
The Maltese Falcon (1930), Dashiell Hammett	The Maltese Falcon (1941)
The Maltese Falcon (1930), Dashiell Hammett	The Black Bird (1975)
The Man Called Noon (1970), Louis L'Amour	The Man Called Noon (1973)
The Man in Black (1964), Marvin H. Albert	Rough Night in Jericho (1967)
The Man in My Basement (2004), Walter Mosley	The Man in My Basement (2025)
The Man in the Gray Flannel Suit (1955), Sloan Wilson	The Man in the Gray Flannel Suit (1956)
The Man of Property (1906), John Galsworthy	That Forsyte Woman (1949)
Man on Fire (1980), A. J. Quinnell	Man on Fire (1987)
Man on Fire (1980), A. J. Quinnell	Man on Fire (2004)
The Man Who Fell to Earth (1963), Walter Tevis	The Man Who Fell to Earth (1976)
The Man Who Fell to Earth (1963), Walter Tevis	The Man Who Fell to Earth (1987)
The Man Who Watched the Trains Go By (1938), Georges Simenon	The Man Who Watched Trains Go By (1952)
The Man with the Golden Gun (1965), Ian Fleming	The Man with the Golden Gun (1974)
The Man Without a Face (1972), Isabelle Holland	The Man Without a Face (1993)
Man Without a Star (1952), Lee Dinford	Man Without a Star (1956)
Man Without a Star (1952), Lee Dinford	A Man Called Gannon (1968)
The Manchurian Candidate (1959), Richard Condon	The Manchurian Candidate (1962)
The Manchurian Candidate (1959), Richard Condon	The Manchurian Candidate (2004)
Manhunt (Japanese: 人狩り, romanized: Hitokari) (1962), Haruhiko Oyabu	Youth of the Beast (Japanese: 野獣の青春, romanized: Yajū no seishun) (1963)
The Map That Leads to You (2017), Joseph Monninger (Note: Written as J. P. Monninger.)	The Map That Leads to You (2025)
Marathon Man (1974), William Goldman	Marathon Man (1976)
Marnie (1961), Winston Graham	Marnie (1964)
The Martian (2011), Andy Weir	The Martian (2015)
Martin Eden (1909), Jack London	Martin Eden (1914)
Martin Eden (1909), Jack London	The Adventures of Martin Eden (1942)
Martin Eden (1909), Jack London	Martin Eden (2019)
Martin Eden (1909), Jack London	Jack London's Martin Eden (2021)
Mary Poppins (1934–1988) (series), P. L. Travers	Mary Poppins (1964)
Mary Poppins (1934–1988) (series), P. L. Travers	Mary Poppins Returns (2018)
MASH: A Novel About Three Army Doctors (1968), Richard Hooker	M*A*S*H (1970)
Master of the World (French: Maître du monde) (1904), Jules Verne	Master of the World (1961)
Master of the World (French: Maître du monde) (1904), Jules Verne	Master of the World (1976)
Matilda (1970), Paul Gallico	Matilda (1978)
Maurice (1971), E. M. Forster	Maurice (1987)
The Mayor of Casterbridge (1886), Thomas Hardy	The Mayor of Casterbridge (1921)
The Mayor of Casterbridge (1886), Thomas Hardy	Mayor Nair (1966)
The Mayor of Casterbridge (1886), Thomas Hardy	Daag (1973)
The Mayor of Casterbridge (1886), Thomas Hardy	Vichitra Jeevitham (1978)
The Mayor of Casterbridge (1886), Thomas Hardy	The Claim (2000)
The Mayor of Casterbridge (1886), Thomas Hardy	The Mayor of Casterbridge (2003)
McTeague (1899), Frank Norris	McTeague (1916)
McTeague (1899), Frank Norris	Greed (1924)
Me and Earl and the Dying Girl (2012), Jesse Andrews	Me and Earl and the Dying Girl (2015)
The Medusa Touch (1973), Peter Van Greenaway	The Medusa Touch (1978)
Meet Me in St. Louis (1942) (Note: First published as a series of short vignettes under the title 5135 Kensington.), Sally Benson	Meet Me in St. Louis (1944)
Memoirs of an Invisible Man (1987), H.F. Saint	Memoirs of an Invisible Man (1992)
The Memoirs of Sherlock Holmes (1893) (Note: Short story collection; stories adapted from this work in order: "The Adventure of Silver Blaze" (1892), "The Adventure of the Musgrave Ritual" (1893) and "The Adventure of the Final Problem" (1893).), Arthur Conan Doyle	The Sleeping Cardinal (1931)
The Memoirs of Sherlock Holmes (1893), Arthur Conan Doyle	Silver Blaze (1937)
The Memoirs of Sherlock Holmes (1893), Arthur Conan Doyle	Sherlock Holmes Faces Death (1943)
The Memoirs of Sherlock Holmes (1893), Arthur Conan Doyle	The Woman in Green (1945)
The Memoirs of Sherlock Holmes (1893), Arthur Conan Doyle	Silver Blaze (1977)
Memory (2010), Donald E. Westlake	The Actor (2025)
The Mephisto Waltz (1969), Fred Mustard Stewart	The Mephisto Waltz (1971)
Mercy Island (1941), Theodore Pratt	Mercy Island (1941)
Merton of the Movies (1919), Harry Leon Wilson	Merton of the Movies (1924)
Merton of the Movies (1919), Harry Leon Wilson	Make Me a Star (1932)
Merton of the Movies (1919), Harry Leon Wilson	Merton of the Movies (1947)
Message in a Bottle (1998), Nicholas Sparks	Message in a Bottle (1999)
Miami Mayhem (1960), Marvin H. Albert	Tony Rome (1967)
Mickey7 (2022), Edward Ashton	Mickey 17 (2025)
Midaq Alley (Arabic: زقاق المدق, romanized: Zuqāq al-Midaqq) (1947), Naguib Mahfouz	Midaq Alley (Spanish: El callejón de los milagros) (1995)
Midnight and Jeremiah (1943), Sterling North	So Dear to My Heart (1949)
A Midnight Clear (1982), William Wharton	A Midnight Clear (1992)
The Midwich Cuckoos (1957), John Wyndham	Village of the Damned (1960)
The Midwich Cuckoos (1957), John Wyndham	Children of the Damned (1963) (Note: Sequel to the 1960 film.)
The Midwich Cuckoos (1957), John Wyndham	Village of the Damned (1995)
Mildred Pierce (1941), James M. Cain	Mildred Pierce (1945)
Millennium (1983), John Varley	Millennium (1989)
Millennium (2005–2007) (series) (Note: Works adapted from the series in chronological order: The Girl with the Dragon Tattoo (2005), The Girl Who Played with Fire (2006) and The Girl Who Kicked the Hornets' Nest (2007).), Stieg Larsson	The Girl with the Dragon Tattoo (2009)
Millennium (2005–2007) (series), Stieg Larsson	The Girl Who Played with Fire (2009)
Millennium (2005–2007) (series), Stieg Larsson	The Girl Who Kicked the Hornets' Nest (2009)
Millennium (2005–2007) (series), Stieg Larsson	The Girl with the Dragon Tattoo (2011)
Mine-Haha, or On the Bodily Education of Young Girls (1903), Frank Wedekind	Innocence (2004)
Mine-Haha, or On the Bodily Education of Young Girls (1903), Frank Wedekind	The Fine Art of Love: Mine Ha-Ha (2005)
The Mirage (Arabic: السراب, romanized: Al-Sarab) (1961), Naguib Mahfouz	The Mirage (1970)
The Mirror Crack'd from Side to Side (1962), Agatha Christie	The Mirror Crack'd (1980)
The Mirror Crack'd from Side to Side (1962), Agatha Christie	Shubho Mahurat (Bengali: শুভ মহরৎ) (2003)
Les Misérables (1862), Victor Hugo	Les Misérables (1909)
Les Misérables (1862), Victor Hugo	The Bishop's Candlesticks (1909)
Les Misérables (1862), Victor Hugo	Les Misérables (1913)
Les Misérables (1862), Victor Hugo	The Bishop's Candlesticks (1913)
Les Misérables (1862), Victor Hugo	Les Misérables (1917)
Les Misérables (1862), Victor Hugo	Tense Moments with Great Authors (1922)
Les Misérables (1862), Victor Hugo	Aa mujô - Dai ippen: Hôrô no maki (Japanese: 噫無情 第一篇 放浪の巻) (1923)
Les Misérables (1862), Victor Hugo	Aa mujô - Dai nihen: Shichô no maki (Japanese: 噫無情 第二篇 市長の巻) (1923)
Les Misérables (1862), Victor Hugo	Les Misérables (1925)
Les Misérables (1862), Victor Hugo	The Bishop's Candlesticks (1929)
Les Misérables (1862), Victor Hugo	Aa mujô: zenpen (Japanese: 噫無情 前篇) (1929)
Les Misérables (1862), Victor Hugo	Aa mujô: kôhen (Japanese: 噫無情 後篇) (1929)
Les Misérables (1862), Victor Hugo	Jean Valjean (1931)
Les Misérables (1862), Victor Hugo	Les Misérables (1934)
Les Misérables (1862), Victor Hugo	Les Misérables (1935)
Les Misérables (1862), Victor Hugo	Gavrosh (Russian: Гаврош) (1937)
Les Misérables (1862), Victor Hugo	The Giant (Japanese: 巨人傳, romanized: Kyojinden) (1938)
Les Misérables (1862), Victor Hugo	Les Misérables (Spanish: Los Miserables) (1943)
Les Misérables (1862), Victor Hugo	Les Misérables (Arabic: البؤساء, El Boassa) (1944)
Les Misérables (1862), Victor Hugo	Les Misérables (Italian: I Miserabili) (1948) (Note: Re-released in 1952.)
Les Misérables (1862), Victor Hugo	Les Misérables: Gods and Demons (Japanese: レ・ミゼラブル あゝ無情 第一部 神と悪魔, romanized: Re mizeraburu: Kami to Akuma) (1950)
Les Misérables (1862), Victor Hugo	Ezhai Padum Padu (Tamil: ஏழை படும் பாடு) (1950)
Les Misérables (1862), Victor Hugo	Beedala Patlu (Telugu: బీదలపాట్లు) (1950)
Les Misérables (1862), Victor Hugo	Les Misérables: Flag of Love and Liberty (Japanese: レ・ミゼラブル あゝ無情 第二部 愛と自由の旗, romanized: Re mizeraburu: Kami to Akuma) (1950)
Les Misérables (1862), Victor Hugo	Les Misérables (1952)
Les Misérables (1862), Victor Hugo	Kundan (Hindi: कुंदन) (1955)
Les Misérables (1862), Victor Hugo	Duppathage Duka (Sinhala: දුප්පතාගේ දුක) (1956)
Les Misérables (1862), Victor Hugo	Sirakaruwa (Sinhala: සිරකරුවා) (1957)
Les Misérables (1862), Victor Hugo	Les Misérables (1958)
Les Misérables (1862), Victor Hugo	Jean Valjean (Korean: 장 발장) (1961)
Les Misérables (1862), Victor Hugo	Sefiller (1967)
Les Misérables (1862), Victor Hugo	Beedala Patlu (Telugu: బీదలపాట్లు) (1972)
Les Misérables (1862), Victor Hugo	Gnana Oli (Tamil: ஞான ஒளி) (1972)
Les Misérables (1862), Victor Hugo	Neethipeedam (Malayalam: നീതിപീഠം) (1977)
Les Misérables (1862), Victor Hugo	Devata (Hindi: देवता) (1978)
Les Misérables (1862), Victor Hugo	Al Boasa (Arabic: البؤساء) (1978)
Les Misérables (1862), Victor Hugo	Les Misérables (1978)
Les Misérables (1862), Victor Hugo	Les Misérables (Japanese: ジャン・バルジャン物語, Jean Valjean Monogatari) (1979)
Les Misérables (1862), Victor Hugo	Los Miserables (1981)
Les Misérables (1862), Victor Hugo	Les Misérables (1982) (Note: Later re-adapted as a four-part television miniseries in 1985.)
Les Misérables (1862), Victor Hugo	Gavroche (1987)
Les Misérables (1862), Victor Hugo	Chakravarthy (Telugu: చక్రవర్తి) (1987)
Les Misérables (1862), Victor Hugo	Les Misérables (1988)
Les Misérables (1862), Victor Hugo	Les Misérables (1995)
Les Misérables (1862), Victor Hugo	Les Misérables (1998)
Les Misérables (1862), Victor Hugo	Les Misérables (2007)
Les Misérables (1862), Victor Hugo	Les Misérables (2012)
Les Misérables (1862), Victor Hugo	Les Misérables: An Endless Journey (Japanese: レ・ミゼラブル 終わりなき旅路, romanized: Re mizeraburu owarinakitabi-ji) (2019)
Les Misérables (1862), Victor Hugo	Jean Valjean (2025)
Les Misérables (1862), Victor Hugo	Les Misérables (2026)
Misery (1987), Stephen King	Misery (1990)
Miss Lonelyhearts (1933), Nathanael West	Advice to the Lovelorn (1933)
Miss Lonelyhearts (1933), Nathanael West	Lonelyhearts (1958)
Miss Lonelyhearts (1933), Nathanael West	Miss Lonelyhearts (1983)
Moby-Dick (1851), Herman Melville	The Sea Beast (1926)
Moby-Dick (1851), Herman Melville	Moby Dick (1930)
Moby-Dick (1851), Herman Melville	Moby Dick (1956)
Moby-Dick (1851), Herman Melville	Moby Dick (Russian: Моби Дик) (1972)
Moby-Dick (1851), Herman Melville	Moby-Dick (1975)
Moby-Dick (1851), Herman Melville	Moby Dick (1978)
Moby-Dick (1851), Herman Melville	The Adventures of Moby Dick (1996)
Moby-Dick (1851), Herman Melville	Captain Ahab (French: Capitaine Achab) (2007) (Note: Originally presented as a 22 minute short film, it was later expanded into a full 100 minute feature film and released in that version three years later.)
Moby-Dick (1851), Herman Melville	Moby Dick (2010)
Moby-Dick (1851), Herman Melville	Moby Dick (2011)
Moby-Dick (1851), Herman Melville	Age of the Dragons (2011)
Moderato Cantabile (1958), Marguerite Duras	Seven Days... Seven Nights (1960)
The Molly Maguires (1969), Arthur H. Lewis	The Molly Maguires (1970)
Monkey in the Middle (1973), Robert Syd Hopkins (Note: Written as Robert Rostand.)	The Killer Elite (1975)
The Monster from Earth's End (1959), Murray Leinster	The Navy vs. the Night Monsters (1966)
Montana Rides Again (1934), Max Brand	Branded (1950)
The Moon and Sixpence (1919), W. Somerset Maugham	The Moon and Sixpence (1942)
Moonraker (1955), Ian Fleming	Moonraker (1979)
The Moon-Spinners (1962), Mary Stewart	The Moon-Spinners (1964)
The Moonstone (1868), Wilkie Collins	The Moonstone (1909)
The Moonstone (1868), Wilkie Collins	The Moonstone (1915)
The Moonstone (1868), Wilkie Collins	The Moonstone (1934)
The Moonstone (1868), Wilkie Collins	The Moonstone (1996)
Morpho Eugenia (1992), A. S. Byatt	Angels & Insects (1996)
The Mortal Instruments – Book One: City of Bones (2007), Cassandra Clare	The Mortal Instruments: City of Bones (2013)
The Mosquito Coast (1981), Paul Theroux	The Mosquito Coast (1986)
Mother Carey's Chickens (1911), Kate Douglas Wiggin	Mother Carey's Chickens (1938)
Mother Carey's Chickens (1911), Kate Douglas Wiggin	Summer Magic (1963)
Mother Night (1961), Kurt Vonnegut	Mother Night (1996)
Mother of Mine (Finnish: Äideistä parhain) (1999), Heikki Hietamies	Mother of Mine (Finnish: Äideistä parhain, Swedish: Den bästa av mödrar) (2005)
A Mother's Gift (2001), Britney Spears and Lynne Spears	Brave New Girl (2004)
The Moving Target (1949), Ross Macdonald (Note: Written as John Macdonald.)	Harper (1966)
Mr. Hobbs' Vacation (1954), Edward Streeter	Mr. Hobbs Takes a Vacation (1962)
Mr. Limpet (1942), Theodore Pratt	The Incredible Mr. Limpet (1964)
Mr. Winkle Goes to War (1943), Theodore Pratt	Mr. Winkle Goes to War (1944)
Mrs. Frisby and the Rats of NIMH (1971), Robert C. O'Brien	The Secret of NIMH (1982)
Mrs. Frisby and the Rats of NIMH (1971), Robert C. O'Brien	The Secret of NIMH 2: Timmy to the Rescue (1999)
Mrs McGinty's Dead (1952), Agatha Christie	Murder Most Foul (1964)
Mud on the Stars (1942), William Bradford Huie	Wild River (1960)
A Mule for the Marquesa (1964), Frank O'Rourke	The Professionals (1966)
Murder in Amityville (1979), Hans Holzer	Amityville II: The Possession (1982)
Murder on the Orient Express (1934), Agatha Christie	Murder on the Orient Express (1974)
Murder on the Orient Express (1934), Agatha Christie	Murder on the Orient Express (2001)
Murder on the Orient Express (1934), Agatha Christie	Murder on the Orient Express (2017)
Murphy's Romance: A Novel (1980), Max Schott	Murphy's Romance (1985)
Mute Witness (1963), Robert L. Fish (Note: Written as Robert L. Pike.)	Bullitt (1968)
My Ántonia (1918), Willa Cather	My Antonia (1995)
My Brother's Wife (Spanish: La mujer de mi hermano) (2002), Jaime Bayly	My Brother's Wife (2005)
My Philadelphia Father (1955), Anthony Joseph Drexel Biddle, Sr. (Note: Written as Cordelia Drexel Biddle.)	The Happiest Millionaire (1967)
My Friend Flicka (1941), Mary O'Hara	My Friend Flicka (1943)
My Friend Flicka (1941), Mary O'Hara	Flicka (2006)
My Friend Flicka (1941), Mary O'Hara	Flicka 2 (2010)
My Friend Flicka (1941), Mary O'Hara	Flicka: Country Pride (2012)
My Kingdom for a Woman (1952), Ismet Regeila	Abdulla the Great (1955)
My Reminiscences as a Cowboy (1930), Frank Harris	Cowboy (1968)
The Mystery of Edwin Drood (1870) (Note: Unfinished work.), Charles Dickens	The Mystery of Edwin Drood (1909)
The Mystery of Edwin Drood (1870), Charles Dickens	The Mystery of Edwin Drood (1914)
The Mystery of Edwin Drood (1870), Charles Dickens	The Mystery of Edwin Drood (1935)
The Mystery of Edwin Drood (1870), Charles Dickens	The Mystery of Edwin Drood (1993)
The Mysterious Island (French: L'Île mystérieuse) (1874), Jules Verne	The Mysterious Island (1929)
The Mysterious Island (French: L'Île mystérieuse) (1874), Jules Verne	Mysterious Island (1941)
The Mysterious Island (French: L'Île mystérieuse) (1874), Jules Verne	Mysterious Island (1951)
The Mysterious Island (French: L'Île mystérieuse) (1874), Jules Verne	Mysterious Island (1961)
The Mysterious Island (French: L'Île mystérieuse) (1874), Jules Verne	The Mysterious Island of Captain Nemo (French: L'Île mystérieuse, Spanish: La isla misteriosa y el capitán Nemo) (1973)
The Mysterious Island (French: L'Île mystérieuse) (1874), Jules Verne	The Mysterious Island (1975)
The Mysterious Island (French: L'Île mystérieuse) (1874), Jules Verne	Mysterious Island (1982)
The Mysterious Island (French: L'Île mystérieuse) (1874), Jules Verne	Mysterious Island (2005)
The Mysterious Island (French: L'Île mystérieuse) (1874), Jules Verne	Journey 2: The Mysterious Island (2012) (Note: Sequel to Journey to the Center of the Earth (2008).)
The Mysterious Island (French: L'Île mystérieuse) (1874), Jules Verne	Jules Verne's Mysterious Island (2012)
Mystic River (2001), Dennis Lehane	Mystic River (2003)

== N ==
Fiction work(s)	Film adaptation(s)
The Naked and the Dead (1948), Norman Mailer	The Naked and the Dead (1958)
The Naked Country (1960), Morris West (Note: Written as "Michael East".)	The Naked Country (1985)
The Naked Face (1970), Sidney Sheldon	The Naked Face (1984)
Naked Lunch (1959), William S. Burroughs	Naked Lunch (1991)
The Name of the Game is Kidnapping (ゲームの名は誘拐, Gēmu no Na wa Yūkai) (2002), Keigo Higashino	G@me (2003)
The Name of the Rose (1980), Umberto Eco	The Name of the Rose (1986)
The Nanny (1987), Dan Greenburg	The Guardian (1990)
The Nanny Diaries (2002), Emma McLaughlin and Nicola Kraus	The Nanny Diaries (2007)
National Velvet (1935), Enid Bagnold	National Velvet (1944)
National Velvet (1935), Enid Bagnold	International Velvet (1978)
The Natural (1952), Bernard Malamud	The Natural (1984)
Nest in a Fallen Tree (1967), Joy Cowley	The Night Digger (1971)
The Net (1912), Rex Beach	Fair Lady (1922)
Nevada (1928), Zane Grey	Nevada (1927)
Nevada (1928), Zane Grey	Nevada (1935)
Nevada (1928), Zane Grey	Nevada (1944)
Never Cry Wolf (1963), Farley Mowat	Never Cry Wolf (1983)
The Neverending Story (German: Die unendliche Geschichte) (1979), Michael Ende	The NeverEnding Story (1984)
The Neverending Story (German: Die unendliche Geschichte) (1979), Michael Ende	The NeverEnding Story II: The Next Chapter (1990)
The Neverending Story (German: Die unendliche Geschichte) (1979), Michael Ende	The NeverEnding Story III (1994)
News of the World (2016), Paulette Jiles	News of the World (2020)
Nicholas Nickleby (serialised 1838–1839, published as a book 1839), Charles Dickens	The Life and Adventures of Nicholas Nickleby (1947)
Nicholas Nickleby (serialised 1838–1839, published as a book 1839), Charles Dickens	Nicholas Nickleby (1985)
Nicholas Nickleby (serialised 1838–1839, published as a book 1839), Charles Dickens	The Life and Adventures of Nicholas Nickleby (2001)
Nicholas Nickleby (serialised 1838–1839, published as a book 1839), Charles Dickens	Nicholas Nickleby (2002)
Night and the City (1938), Gerald Kersh	Night and the City (1950)
Night and the City (1938), Gerald Kersh	Night and the City (1992)
Night Has a Thousand Eyes (1945), Cornell Woolrich (Note: Written as George Hopley.)	Night Has a Thousand Eyes (1948)
The Night of the Generals (German: Die Nacht der Generale) (1963), Hans Hellmut Kirst	The Night of the Generals (1967)
The Night of the Hunter (1953), Davis Grubb	The Night of the Hunter (1955)
The Night of the Hunter (1953), Davis Grubb	Night of the Hunter (1991)
Night Shift (1942), Maritta Wolff	The Man I Love (1947)
Night Shift (1978) (Note: Short story collection; stories adapted from this work in order: "Graveyard Shift" (1970), "The Mangler" (1972) "The Boogeyman" (1973), "Trucks" (also 1973), "Sometimes They Come Back" (1974), "The Lawnmower Man" (1975), "The Ledge" (1976), "Quitters, Inc." (1978) and "Children of the Corn" (1977).), Stephen King	Children of the Corn (1984)
Night Shift (1978), Stephen King	Cat's Eye (1985)
Night Shift (1978), Stephen King	Maximum Overdrive (1986)
Night Shift (1978), Stephen King	Graveyard Shift (1990)
Night Shift (1978), Stephen King	Sometimes They Come Back (1991)
Night Shift (1978), Stephen King	The Mangler (1995)
Night Shift (1978), Stephen King	Trucks (1997)
Night Shift (1978), Stephen King	Children of the Corn (2009)
Night Shift (1978), Stephen King	Children of the Corn (2020)
Night Shift (1978), Stephen King	The Boogeyman (2023)
Night Watch (Russian: «Ночной Дозор») (1998), Sergey Lukyanenko	Night Watch (2004)
Night Watch (Russian: «Ночной Дозор») (1998), Sergey Lukyanenko	Day Watch (2006) (Note: Film title adapted from the sequel novel Day Watch (Russian: «Дневной Дозор») (2000) by the same author.)
Nightmare Alley (1946), William Lindsay Gresham	Nightmare Alley (1947)
Nightmare Alley (1946), William Lindsay Gresham	Nightmare Alley (2021)
Nightmares & Dreamscapes (1993), (Note: Short story collection; stories adapted from this work in order: Dolan's Cadillac (1985), "The Night Flier" (1988) and "Chattery Teeth" (1992).) Stephen King	The Night Flier (1997)
Nightmares & Dreamscapes (1993), Stephen King	Quicksilver Highway (1997)
Nightmares & Dreamscapes (1993), Stephen King	Dolan's Cadillac (2009)
Nights in Rodanthe (2002), Nicholas Sparks	Nights in Rodanthe (2008)
Nightwing (1977), Martin Cruz Smith	Nightwing (1979)
Nine and a Half Weeks: A Memoir of a Love Affair (1978), Elizabeth McNeill	9½ Weeks (1986)
Nine and a Half Weeks: A Memoir of a Love Affair (1978), Elizabeth McNeill	Another 9½ Weeks (1997)
Nine and a Half Weeks: A Memoir of a Love Affair (1978), Elizabeth McNeill	The First 9½ Weeks (1998)
Nineteen Eighty-Four (1949), George Orwell	Nineteen Eighty-Four (1954)
Nineteen Eighty-Four (1949), George Orwell	1984 (1956)
Nineteen Eighty-Four (1949), George Orwell	Nineteen Eighty-Four (1984)
Nineteen Eighty-Four (1949), George Orwell	1984 (2023)
The Ninth Configuration (1978), William Peter Blatty	The Ninth Configuration (1980)
No Country for Old Men (2005), Cormac McCarthy	No Country for Old Men (2007)
No Down Payment (1957), John McPartland	No Down Payment (1957)
No Orchids for Miss Blandish (1939), James Hadley Chase	No Orchids for Miss Blandish (1948)
No Orchids for Miss Blandish (1939), James Hadley Chase	The Grissom Gang (1971)
No Orchids for Miss Blandish (1939), James Hadley Chase	The Flesh of the Orchid (French: La Chair de l'orchidée) (1975)
Nobody Loves a Drunken Indian (1967), Clair Huffaker	Flap (1970)
The North Star (1956), Henry Wilson Allen	North Star (1996)
Northern Lights (1995), Philip Pullman	The Golden Compass (2007)
Northwest Passage (1937), Kenneth Roberts	Northwest Passage (1940)
Nostromo (1904), Joseph Conrad	The Silver Treasure (1926)
The Notebook (1996), Nicholas Sparks	The Notebook (2004)
The Notebooks of Major Thompson (French: Les Carnets du major Thompson) (1954), Pierre Daninos	The French, They Are a Funny Race (1955)
Nothing Lasts Forever (1979), Roderick Thorp	Die Hard (1988)
Nurse Matilda (1964–1974) (series), Christianna Brand	Nanny McPhee (2005)
Nurse Matilda (1964–1974) (series), Christianna Brand	Nanny McPhee and the Big Bang (2010)

== O ==
Fiction work(s)	Film adaptation(s)
Octopussy and The Living Daylights (1966), Ian Fleming	Octopussy (1983)
Octopussy and The Living Daylights (1966), Ian Fleming	The Living Daylights (1987)
Odd Man Out (1945), F. L. Green	Odd Man Out (1947)
Odds Against Tomorrow (1958), William P. McGivern	Odds Against Tomorrow (1959)
Odyssey (8th century BC), Homer	The Odyssey (Italian: L'Odissea) (1911)
Odyssey (8th century BC), Homer	Ulysses (1955)
Odyssey (8th century BC), Homer	The Odyssey (1987)
Odyssey (8th century BC), Homer	Ulysses' Gaze (Greek: Το βλέμμα του Οδυσσέα, To Vlemma tou Odyssea) (1995)
Odyssey (8th century BC), Homer	O Brother, Where Art Thou? (2000)
Odyssey (8th century BC), Homer	Odysseus and the Isle of the Mists (2007)
Odyssey (8th century BC), Homer	The Odyssey (2026)
Audition (1997), Ryu Murakami	Audition (1999)
Of Human Bondage (1915), W. Somerset Maugham	Of Human Bondage (1934)
Of Human Bondage (1915), W. Somerset Maugham	Of Human Bondage (1946)
Of Human Bondage (1915), W. Somerset Maugham	Of Human Bondage (1964)
Of Mice and Men (1937), John Steinbeck	Of Mice and Men (1939)
Of Mice and Men (1937), John Steinbeck	Of Mice and Men (1968)
Of Mice and Men (1937), John Steinbeck	Of Mice and Men (1981)
Of Mice and Men (1937), John Steinbeck	Of Mice and Men (1992)
Oil! (1927), Upton Sinclair	There Will Be Blood (2007)
The Old Curiosity Shop (serialised 1840–1841, published as a book 1841), Charles Dickens	The Old Curiosity Shop (1914)
The Old Curiosity Shop (serialised 1840–1841, published as a book 1841), Charles Dickens	The Old Curiosity Shop (1921)
The Old Curiosity Shop (serialised 1840–1841, published as a book 1841), Charles Dickens	The Old Curiosity Shop (1934)
The Old Curiosity Shop (serialised 1840–1841, published as a book 1841), Charles Dickens	Mister Quilp (1975)
The Old Curiosity Shop (serialised 1840–1841, published as a book 1841), Charles Dickens	The Old Curiosity Shop (1984)
The Old Curiosity Shop (serialised 1840–1841, published as a book 1841), Charles Dickens	The Old Curiosity Shop (1995)
The Old Curiosity Shop (serialised 1840–1841, published as a book 1841), Charles Dickens	The Old Curiosity Shop (2007)
The Old Man and the Sea (written 1951, published 1952), Ernest Hemingway	The Old Man and the Sea (1958)
The Old Man and the Sea (written 1951, published 1952), Ernest Hemingway	The Old Man and the Sea (1990)
Old Yeller (1956), Fred Gipson	Old Yeller (1957)
Old Yeller (1956), Fred Gipson	Savage Sam (1963) (Note: Film adapted from the sequel novel Savage Sam (1962) by the same author.)
Old Yeller (1956), Fred Gipson	Little Arliss (1984) (Note: Film adapted from the sequel novel Little Arliss (1978) by the same author.)
Oliver Twist (serialised 1837–1839, published as a book 1838), Charles Dickens	Oliver Twist (1912; British)
Oliver Twist (serialised 1837–1839, published as a book 1838), Charles Dickens	Oliver Twist (1912; American)
Oliver Twist (serialised 1837–1839, published as a book 1838), Charles Dickens	Oliver Twist (1916)
Oliver Twist (serialised 1837–1839, published as a book 1838), Charles Dickens	Oliver Twist, Jr. (1921)
Oliver Twist (serialised 1837–1839, published as a book 1838), Charles Dickens	Oliver Twist (1922)
Oliver Twist (serialised 1837–1839, published as a book 1838), Charles Dickens	Oliver Twist (1933)
Oliver Twist (serialised 1837–1839, published as a book 1838), Charles Dickens	Oliver Twist (1948)
Oliver Twist (serialised 1837–1839, published as a book 1838), Charles Dickens	Oliver! (1968)
Oliver Twist (serialised 1837–1839, published as a book 1838), Charles Dickens	Oliver and the Artful Dodger (1972)
Oliver Twist (serialised 1837–1839, published as a book 1838), Charles Dickens	Oliver Twist (1974)
Oliver Twist (serialised 1837–1839, published as a book 1838), Charles Dickens	Oliver Twist (1982, Hallmark Hall of Fame)
Oliver Twist (serialised 1837–1839, published as a book 1838), Charles Dickens	Oliver Twist (1982, Burbank Films Australia)
Oliver Twist (serialised 1837–1839, published as a book 1838), Charles Dickens	Las Aventuras de Oliver Twist (1987)
Oliver Twist (serialised 1837–1839, published as a book 1838), Charles Dickens	Oliver & Company (1988)
Oliver Twist (serialised 1837–1839, published as a book 1838), Charles Dickens	Twisted (1996)
Oliver Twist (serialised 1837–1839, published as a book 1838), Charles Dickens	Oliver Twist (1997)
Oliver Twist (serialised 1837–1839, published as a book 1838), Charles Dickens	Twist (2003)
Oliver Twist (serialised 1837–1839, published as a book 1838), Charles Dickens	Boy called Twist (2004)
Oliver Twist (serialised 1837–1839, published as a book 1838), Charles Dickens	Oliver Twist (2005)
Oliver Twist (serialised 1837–1839, published as a book 1838), Charles Dickens	Twist (2021)
Oliver's Story (1977), Erich Segal	Oliver's Story (1978)
Oms Linked Together (French: Oms en série) (1957), Stefan Wul	Fantastic Planet (1973)
On Her Majesty's Secret Service (1963), Ian Fleming	On Her Majesty's Secret Service (1969)
On Stranger Tides (1987), Tim Powers	Pirates of the Caribbean: On Stranger Tides (2011)
Once in the Saddle and Pasó por aquí (1927), Eugene Manlove Rhodes	Four Faces West (1948)
One Flew Over the Cuckoo's Nest (1962), Ken Kesey	One Flew Over the Cuckoo's Nest (1975)
One for the Money (1994), Janet Evanovich	One for the Money (2011)
One Gallant Rush (1965), Peter Burchard	Glory (1989)
One Hundred Years Ahead (Russian: Сто лет тому вперёд) (1976), Kir Bulychev	One Hundred Years Ahead (2024)
One More River (1933), John Galsworthy	One More River (1934)
One More Spring (1933), Robert Nathan	One More Spring (1935)
One Shot (2004), Lee Child	Jack Reacher (2012)
One Thousand and One Nights (Arabic: أَلْفُ لَيْلَةٍ وَلَيْلَةٌ ʾAlf Laylah wa-Laylah) (Note: Year and author undetermined; many narratives, characters and elements of the work originated over many centuries by various Middle Eastern sources.)	The Thief of Bagdad (1924)
One Thousand and One Nights (Arabic: أَلْفُ لَيْلَةٍ وَلَيْلَةٌ ʾAlf Laylah wa-Laylah)	The Thief of Bagdad (1940)
One Thousand and One Nights (Arabic: أَلْفُ لَيْلَةٍ وَلَيْلَةٌ ʾAlf Laylah wa-Laylah)	Arabian Nights (1942)
One Thousand and One Nights (Arabic: أَلْفُ لَيْلَةٍ وَلَيْلَةٌ ʾAlf Laylah wa-Laylah)	A Thousand and One Nights (1945)
One Thousand and One Nights (Arabic: أَلْفُ لَيْلَةٍ وَلَيْلَةٌ ʾAlf Laylah wa-Laylah)	The Thief of Bagdad (German: Die Diebin von Bagdad) (1952)
One Thousand and One Nights (Arabic: أَلْفُ لَيْلَةٍ وَلَيْلَةٌ ʾAlf Laylah wa-Laylah)	1001 Arabian Nights (1959)
One Thousand and One Nights (Arabic: أَلْفُ لَيْلَةٍ وَلَيْلَةٌ ʾAlf Laylah wa-Laylah)	The Thief of Baghdad (Italian: Il ladro di Bagdad) (1961)
One Thousand and One Nights (Arabic: أَلْفُ لَيْلَةٍ وَلَيْلَةٌ ʾAlf Laylah wa-Laylah)	A Thousand and One Nights (Japanese: 千夜一夜物語, romanized: Senya Ichiya Monogatari) (1969)
One Thousand and One Nights (Arabic: أَلْفُ لَيْلَةٍ وَلَيْلَةٌ ʾAlf Laylah wa-Laylah)	Arabian Nights (Italian: Il fiore delle mille e una notte) (1974)
One Thousand and One Nights (Arabic: أَلْفُ لَيْلَةٍ وَلَيْلَةٌ ʾAlf Laylah wa-Laylah)	The Thief of Baghdad (1978)
One Thousand and One Nights (Arabic: أَلْفُ لَيْلَةٍ وَلَيْلَةٌ ʾAlf Laylah wa-Laylah)	Scooby-Doo in Arabian Nights (1994)
One Thousand and One Nights (Arabic: أَلْفُ لَيْلَةٍ وَلَيْلَةٌ ʾAlf Laylah wa-Laylah)	Arabian Nights (Portuguese: As Mil e uma Noites) (2015)
The Open Range Men (1990), Lauran Paine	Open Range (2003)
Operation Terror (1961), Gordon Gordon and Mildred Gordon	Experiment in Terror (1962)
Ordinary People (1976), Judith Guest	Ordinary People (1980)
Orlando: A Biography (1928), Virginia Woolf	Orlando (1992)
The Osterman Weekend (1972), Robert Ludlum	The Osterman Weekend (1983)
The Other Boleyn Girl (2001), Philippa Gregory	The Other Boleyn Girl (2003)
The Other Boleyn Girl (2001), Philippa Gregory	The Other Boleyn Girl (2008)
The Other One (1952), Catherine Turney	Back from the Dead (1957)
The Other Side of Midnight (1973), Sidney Sheldon	The Other Side of Midnight (1977)
Our Man in Havana (1958), Graham Greene	Our Man in Havana (1959)
Out of Sight (1996), Elmore Leonard	Out of Sight (1998)
An Outcast of the Islands (1896), Joseph Conrad	Outcast of the Islands (1952)
The Outsiders (1967), S. E. Hinton	The Outsiders (1983)
The Ox-Bow Incident (1940), Walter Van Tilburg Clark	The Ox-Bow Incident (1943)

== P ==
Fiction work(s)	Film adaptation(s)
A Painted House (2001), John Grisham	A Painted House (2003)
The Painted Veil (1925), W. Somerset Maugham	The Painted Veil (1934)
The Painted Veil (1925), W. Somerset Maugham	The Seventh Sin (1957)
The Painted Veil (1925), W. Somerset Maugham	The Painted Veil (2006)
The Parasite (1894), Arthur Conan Doyle	The Parasite (1997)
Parineeta (Bengali: পরিণীতা, romanized: Porinita) (1914), Sharat Chandra Chattopadhyay	Parineeta (1942)
Parineeta (Bengali: পরিণীতা, romanized: Porinita) (1914), Sharat Chandra Chattopadhyay	Parineeta (1953)
Parineeta (Bengali: পরিণীতা, romanized: Porinita) (1914), Sharat Chandra Chattopadhyay	Manamalai (1958)
Parineeta (Bengali: পরিণীতা, romanized: Porinita) (1914), Sharat Chandra Chattopadhyay	Parineeta (1969)
Parineeta (Bengali: পরিণীতা, romanized: Porinita) (1914), Sharat Chandra Chattopadhyay	Sankoch (1976)
Parineeta (Bengali: পরিণীতা, romanized: Porinita) (1914), Sharat Chandra Chattopadhyay	Parineeta (2005)
Parineeta (Bengali: পরিণীতা, romanized: Porinita) (1914), Sharat Chandra Chattopadhyay	Parineeta (2019)
Paris Blues (1957), Harold Flender	Paris Blues (1961)
A Passage to India (1924), E. M. Forster	A Passage to India (1984)
Patriot Games (1987), Tom Clancy	Patriot Games (1992)
The Peacock Spring (1975), Rumer Godden	The Peacock Spring (1996)
The Pelican Brief (1992), John Grisham	The Pelican Brief (1993)
The Penal Colony (1987), Richard Herley	No Escape (1994)
The People That Time Forgot (1918), Edgar Rice Burroughs	The People That Time Forgot (1977)
Percy Jackson & the Olympians (2005–2009) (series) (Note: Plots adapted from two related works: The Lightning Thief (2005) and The Sea of Monsters (2006) respectively.), Rick Riordan	Percy Jackson & the Olympians: The Lightning Thief (2010)
Percy Jackson & the Olympians (2005–2009) (series), Rick Riordan	Percy Jackson: Sea of Monsters (2013)
Perfect Little Angels (1989), Andrew Neiderman	Perfect Little Angels (1998)
Pet Sematary (1983), Stephen King	Pet Sematary (1989)
Pet Sematary (1983), Stephen King	Pet Sematary Two (1992) (Note: Sequel to the 1989 film.)
Pet Sematary (1983), Stephen King	Pet Sematary (2019)
Pet Sematary (1983), Stephen King	Pet Sematary: Bloodlines (2023) (Note: Prequel to the 2019 film.)
Peter and Wendy (1911) (Note: Based on the original author's play Peter Pan; or, the Boy Who Wouldn't Grow Up (1904).), J. M. Barrie	Peter Pan (1924)
Peter and Wendy (1911), J. M. Barrie	Peter Pan (1953)
Peter and Wendy (1911), J. M. Barrie	Peter Pan (1976)
Peter and Wendy (1911), J. M. Barrie	Peter Pan (Russian: Питер Пэн) (1987)
Peter and Wendy (1911), J. M. Barrie	Peter Pan (1988)
Peter and Wendy (1911), J. M. Barrie	Hook (1991)
Peter and Wendy (1911), J. M. Barrie	Return to Never Land (2002) (Note: Sequel to the 1953 film.)
Peter and Wendy (1911), J. M. Barrie	Peter Pan (2003)
Peter and Wendy (1911), J. M. Barrie	Neverland (2003)
Peter and Wendy (1911), J. M. Barrie	Finding Neverland (2004)
Peter and Wendy (1911), J. M. Barrie	Tinker Bell (2008) (Note: Tinker Bell (film series))
Peter and Wendy (1911), J. M. Barrie	Tinker Bell and the Lost Treasure (2009)
Peter and Wendy (1911), J. M. Barrie	Tinker Bell and the Great Fairy Rescue (2010)
Peter and Wendy (1911), J. M. Barrie	Secret of the Wings (2012)
Peter and Wendy (1911), J. M. Barrie	The Pirate Fairy (2014)
Peter and Wendy (1911), J. M. Barrie	Tinker Bell and the Legend of the NeverBeast (2014)
Peter and Wendy (1911), J. M. Barrie	Pan (2015)
Peter and Wendy (1911), J. M. Barrie	Peter and Wendy (2015)
Peter and Wendy (1911), J. M. Barrie	Wendy (2020)
Peter and Wendy (1911), J. M. Barrie	Come Away (2020)
Peter and Wendy (1911), J. M. Barrie	Peter Pan & Wendy (2023)
Peyton Place (1956), Grace Metalious	Peyton Place (1957)
Phantom Lady (1942), Cornell Woolrich (Note: Written as William Irish.)	Phantom Lady (1944)
The Phantom of the Opera (French: Le Fantôme de l'Opéra) (serialised 1909–1910, published as a book 1910), Gaston Leroux	The Phantom of the Opera (German: Das Phantom der Oper) (1916)
The Phantom of the Opera (French: Le Fantôme de l'Opéra) (serialised 1909–1910, published as a book 1910), Gaston Leroux	The Phantom of the Opera (1925)
The Phantom of the Opera (French: Le Fantôme de l'Opéra) (serialised 1909–1910, published as a book 1910), Gaston Leroux	Phantom of the Opera (1943)
The Phantom of the Opera (French: Le Fantôme de l'Opéra) (serialised 1909–1910, published as a book 1910), Gaston Leroux	The Phantom of the Opera (1962)
The Phantom of the Opera (French: Le Fantôme de l'Opéra) (serialised 1909–1910, published as a book 1910), Gaston Leroux	The Phantom of the Opera (German: Das Phantom von Budapest) (1983)
The Phantom of the Opera (French: Le Fantôme de l'Opéra) (serialised 1909–1910, published as a book 1910), Gaston Leroux	The Phantom of the Opera (1988)
The Phantom of the Opera (French: Le Fantôme de l'Opéra) (serialised 1909–1910, published as a book 1910), Gaston Leroux	The Phantom of the Opera (1989)
The Phantom of the Opera (French: Le Fantôme de l'Opéra) (serialised 1909–1910, published as a book 1910), Gaston Leroux	The Phantom of the Opera (1998)
The Phantom of the Opera (French: Le Fantôme de l'Opéra) (serialised 1909–1910, published as a book 1910), Gaston Leroux	The Phantom of the Opera (2004)
Pharaoh (1895), Bolesław Prus	Pharaoh (1966)
The Philadelphian (1957), Richard P. Powell	The Young Philadelphians (1959)
The Pianist (Spanish: El pianista) (1985), Manuel Vázquez Montalbán	The Pianist (1998)
The Pickwick Papers (serialised 1836–1837, published as a book 1837), Charles Dickens	The Adventures of Mr. Pickwick (1921)
The Pickwick Papers (serialised 1836–1837, published as a book 1837), Charles Dickens	The Pickwick Papers (1952)
The Pickwick Papers (serialised 1836–1837, published as a book 1837), Charles Dickens	The Pickwick Papers (1985)
The Pickwick Papers (serialised 1836–1837, published as a book 1837), Charles Dickens	Ghost Stories from the Pickwick Papers (1987)
The Picture of Dorian Gray (1890), Oscar Wilde
The Picture of Dorian Gray (1890), Oscar Wilde	The Picture of Dorian Gray (1916)
The Picture of Dorian Gray (1890), Oscar Wilde	The Picture of Dorian Gray (German: Das Bildnis des Dorian Gray) (1917)
The Picture of Dorian Gray (1890), Oscar Wilde	The Royal Life (Hungarian: Az élet királya) (1918)
The Picture of Dorian Gray (1890), Oscar Wilde	The Picture of Dorian Gray (1945)
The Picture of Dorian Gray (1890), Oscar Wilde	Dorian Gray (a. k. a. The Evils of Dorian Gray or The Secret of Dorian Gray) (1970)
The Picture of Dorian Gray (1890), Oscar Wilde	The Picture of Dorian Gray (1973)
The Picture of Dorian Gray (1890), Oscar Wilde	The Picture of Dorian Gray (French: Le Portrait de Dorian Gray) (1977)
The Picture of Dorian Gray (1890), Oscar Wilde	The Sins of Dorian Gray (1983)
The Picture of Dorian Gray (1890), Oscar Wilde	Dorian Gray in the Mirror of the Yellow Press (German: Dorian Gray im Spiegel der Boulevardpresse) (1984)
The Picture of Dorian Gray (1890), Oscar Wilde	Pact with the Devil (a. k. a. Dorian) (2004)
The Picture of Dorian Gray (1890), Oscar Wilde	Dorian (2004)
The Picture of Dorian Gray (1890), Oscar Wilde	The Picture of Dorian Gray (2004)
The Picture of Dorian Gray (1890), Oscar Wilde	The Picture of Dorian Gray (2006)
The Picture of Dorian Gray (1890), Oscar Wilde	The Picture of Dorian Gray (2007)
The Picture of Dorian Gray (1890), Oscar Wilde	The Picture (of Dorian Gray) (2009)
The Picture of Dorian Gray (1890), Oscar Wilde	Dorian Gray (2009)
The Picture of Dorian Gray (1890), Oscar Wilde	The Picture of Dorian Gray (2021)
The Pillar of Light (1990), Gerald N. Lund	The Work and the Glory (2004)
Pin (1981), Andrew Neiderman	Pin (1988)
Pioneer, Go Home! (1959), Richard P. Powell	Follow That Dream (1964)
The Pirates! in an Adventure with Scientists (2004), Gideon Defoe	The Pirates! In an Adventure with Scientists (2012)
Pity My Simplicity (1944), Christopher Massie	Love Letters (1945)
Planet of the Apes (French: La Planète des singes) (1963), Pierre Boulle	Planet of the Apes (1968)
Planet of the Apes (French: La Planète des singes) (1963), Pierre Boulle	Beneath the Planet of the Apes (1970)
Planet of the Apes (French: La Planète des singes) (1963), Pierre Boulle	Escape from the Planet of the Apes (1971)
Planet of the Apes (French: La Planète des singes) (1963), Pierre Boulle	Conquest of the Planet of the Apes (1972)
Planet of the Apes (French: La Planète des singes) (1963), Pierre Boulle	Battle for the Planet of the Apes (1973)
Planet of the Apes (French: La Planète des singes) (1963), Pierre Boulle	Planet of the Apes (2001)
Planet of the Apes (French: La Planète des singes) (1963), Pierre Boulle	Rise of the Planet of the Apes (2011)
Planet of the Apes (French: La Planète des singes) (1963), Pierre Boulle	Dawn of the Planet of the Apes (2014)
Planet of the Apes (French: La Planète des singes) (1963), Pierre Boulle	War for the Planet of the Apes (2017)
Planet of the Apes (French: La Planète des singes) (1963), Pierre Boulle	Kingdom of the Planet of the Apes (2024)
Pleasure Island (1949), William Maier	The Girls of Pleasure Island (1953)
Point de lendemain: conte dédiée à la reine (1876), Dominique Vivant	The Lovers (French: Les Amants) (1958)
Pollyanna (1913), Eleanor H. Porter	Pollyanna (1920)
Pollyanna (1913), Eleanor H. Porter	Pollyanna (1960)
Pollyanna (1913), Eleanor H. Porter	Hayat Sevince Güzel (1971)
Pollyanna (1913), Eleanor H. Porter	The Adventures of Pollyanna (1982)
Pollyanna (1913), Eleanor H. Porter	Polly (1989)
Pollyanna (1913), Eleanor H. Porter	Polly: Comin' Home! (1990) (Note: Sequel to the 1989 film.)
Pollyanna (1913), Eleanor H. Porter	Pollyanna (2003)
Poodle Springs (written 1959–1988, published 1989), Raymond Chandler and Robert B. Parker	Poodle Springs (1998)
The Pope of Greenwich Village (1979), Vincent Patrick	The Pope of Greenwich Village (1984)
Porno (2002), Irvine Welsh	T2 Trainspotting (2017)
The Pornographers (Japanese: エロ事師たち, romanized: Erogotoshi-tachi) (1963), Akiyuki Nosaka	The Pornographers (1966)
Portnoy's Complaint (1969), Philip Roth	Portnoy's Complaint (1972)
The Poseidon Adventure (1972), Paul Gallico	The Poseidon Adventure (1972)
The Poseidon Adventure (1972), Paul Gallico	Beyond the Poseidon Adventure (1979)
The Poseidon Adventure (1972), Paul Gallico	The Poseidon Adventure (2005)
The Poseidon Adventure (1972), Paul Gallico	Poseidon (2006)
The Positronic Man (1993), Isaac Asimov and Robert Silverberg	Bicentennial Man (1999)
Possession: A Romance (1990), A. S. Byatt	Possession (2002)
The Postman (1985), David Brin	The Postman (1997)
The Postman Always Rings Twice (1934), James Cain	The Last Turning (French: Le Dernier Tournant) (1939)
The Postman Always Rings Twice (1934), James Cain	Obsession (Italian: Ossessione) (1942)
The Postman Always Rings Twice (1934), James Cain	The Postman Always Rings Twice (1946)
The Postman Always Rings Twice (1934), James Cain	The Postman Always Rings Twice (1981)
The Power (1956), Frank M. Robinson	The Power (1968)
The Power and the Glory (1940), Graham Greene	The Fugitive (1947)
The Power of One (1989), Bryce Courtenay	The Power of One (1992)
Presumed Innocent (1987), Scott Turow	Presumed Innocent (1990)
Pride and Prejudice (1813), Jane Austen	Pride and Prejudice (1940)
Pride and Prejudice (1813), Jane Austen	Pride & Prejudice: A Latter-Day Comedy (2003)
Pride and Prejudice (1813), Jane Austen	Bride and Prejudice (2004)
Pride and Prejudice (1813), Jane Austen	Pride & Prejudice (2005)
The Prince and the Pauper (1881), Mark Twain
The Prince and the Pauper (1881), Mark Twain	The Prince and the Pauper (1915)
The Prince and the Pauper (1881), Mark Twain	The Prince and the Pauper (German: Der Prinz und der Bettelknabe) (1920)
The Prince and the Pauper (1881), Mark Twain	The Prince and the Pauper (1937)
The Prince and the Pauper (1881), Mark Twain	The Prince and the Pauper (1943)
The Prince and the Pauper (1881), Mark Twain	The Prince and the Pauper (1962)
The Prince and the Pauper (1881), Mark Twain	Raja Aur Runk (1968)
The Prince and the Pauper (1881), Mark Twain	The Adventures of the Prince and the Pauper (1969)
The Prince and the Pauper (1881), Mark Twain	The Prince and the Pauper (Czech: Princ a chuďas) (1971)
The Prince and the Pauper (1881), Mark Twain	The Prince and the Pauper (1972)
The Prince and the Pauper (1881), Mark Twain	The Prince and the Pauper (Russian: Принц и нищий) (1972)
The Prince and the Pauper (1881), Mark Twain	The Prince and the Pauper (1977)
The Prince and the Pauper (1881), Mark Twain	The Prince and the Pauper (1995)
The Prince and the Pauper (1881), Mark Twain	The Prince and the Pauper (1996)
The Prince and the Pauper (1881), Mark Twain	The Prince and the Surfer (1999)
The Prince and the Pauper (1881), Mark Twain	The Pooch and the Pauper (2000)
The Prince and the Pauper (1881), Mark Twain	The Prince and the Pauper (2000)
The Prince and the Pauper (1881), Mark Twain	Barbie as the Princess and the Pauper (2004)
The Prince and the Pauper (1881), Mark Twain	The Prince and the Pauper (Bulgarian: Принцът и просякът, Printzat i prosyakat) (2005)
The Prince and the Pauper (1881), Mark Twain	The Prince and the Pauper: Double Trouble (2007)
The Prince and the Pauper (1881), Mark Twain	A Modern Twain Story: The Prince and the Pauper (2007)
The Prince of Tides (1986), Pat Conroy	The Prince of Tides (1991)
The Princess Bride (1973), William Goldman	The Princess Bride (1987)
The Princess Diaries (2000–2009) (series), Meg Cabot	The Princess Diaries (2002)
The Princess Diaries (2000–2009) (series), Meg Cabot	The Princess Diaries 2: Royal Engagement (2004)
A Princess of Mars (1917), Edgar Rice Burroughs	Princess of Mars (2009)
A Princess of Mars (1917), Edgar Rice Burroughs	John Carter (2012)
The Prisoner of Zenda (1894), Anthony Hope	The Prisoner of Zenda (1913)
The Prisoner of Zenda (1894), Anthony Hope	The Prisoner of Zenda (1915)
The Prisoner of Zenda (1894), Anthony Hope	The Prisoner of Zenda (1922)
The Prisoner of Zenda (1894), Anthony Hope	The Prisoner of Zenda (1937)
The Prisoner of Zenda (1894), Anthony Hope	The Prisoner of Zenda (1952)
The Prisoner of Zenda (1894), Anthony Hope	The Prisoner of Zenda (1979)
The Prisoner of Zenda (1894), Anthony Hope	The Prisoner of Zenda (1984)
The Prisoner of Zenda (1894), Anthony Hope	Prisoner of Zenda (1988)
Project Hail Mary (2021), Andy Weir	Project Hail Mary (2026)
Promise at Dawn (1961), Romain Gary	Promise at Dawn (1970)
Pronto (1993), Elmore Leonard	Pronto (1997)
Professor Unrat, oder Das Ende eines Tyrannen (1905), Heinrich Mann	The Blue Angel (German: Der blaue Engel) (1930)
Professor Unrat, oder Das Ende eines Tyrannen (1905), Heinrich Mann	The Blue Angel (1959)
Professor Unrat, oder Das Ende eines Tyrannen (1905), Heinrich Mann	Pinjara (Marathi: पिंजरा) (1972)
Professor Unrat, oder Das Ende eines Tyrannen (1905), Heinrich Mann	Blonde Angel (Portuguese: Anjo Loiro) (1973)
Professor Unrat, oder Das Ende eines Tyrannen (1905), Heinrich Mann	Lola (1981)
Psycho (1959), Robert Bloch	Psycho (1960)
Psycho (1959), Robert Bloch	Psycho II (1983) (Note: No relation to the 1982 novel which shared the same title.)
Psycho (1959), Robert Bloch	Psycho III (1986)
Psycho (1959), Robert Bloch	Bates Motel (1987) (Note: Failed pilot for a proposed TV series of the same title.)
Psycho (1959), Robert Bloch	Psycho IV: The Beginning (1990)
Psycho (1959), Robert Bloch	Psycho (1998) (Note: Shot-for-shot of the 1998 film.)
The Puppet Masters (1951), Robert A. Heinlein	The Brain Eaters (1958)
The Puppet Masters (1951), Robert A. Heinlein	The Puppet Masters (1994)
The Purple Cloud (1901), M. P. Shiel	The World, the Flesh and the Devil (1959)

== Q ==
Fiction work(s)	Film adaptation(s)
Q & A (1977), Edwin Torres	Q & A (1990)
The Queen of the Damned (1988), Anne Rice	Queen of the Damned (2002)
Quentin Durward (1823), Sir Walter Scott	The Adventures of Quentin Durward (1955)
The Quick and the Dead (1973), Louis L'Amour	The Quick and the Dead (1987)
Quick Change (1981), Jay Cronley	Quick Change (1990)
The Quiet American (1955), Graham Greene	The Quiet American (1958)
The Quiet American (1955), Graham Greene	The Quiet American (2002)

== R ==
Fiction work(s)	Film adaptation(s)
Radio Free Albemuth (1976), Philip K. Dick	Radio Free Albemuth (2011)
The Radleys (2010), Matt Haig	The Radleys (2024)
Ragtime (1975), E. L. Doctorow	Ragtime (1981)
Raiders of Spanish Peaks (1938), Zane Grey	The Arizona Raiders (1936)
Rain (2000), V.C. Andrews	Rain (2006)
The Rainbird Pattern (1972), Victor Canning	Family Plot (1976)
The Rainbow (1915), D. H. Lawrence	The Rainbow (1989)
The Rainbow Trail (a. k. a. The Desert Crucible) (1915), Zane Grey	The Rainbow Trail (1918)
The Rainbow Trail (a. k. a. The Desert Crucible) (1915), Zane Grey	The Rainbow Trail (1925)
The Rainbow Trail (a. k. a. The Desert Crucible) (1915), Zane Grey	The Rainbow Trail (1932)
The Rainmaker (1995), John Grisham	The Rainmaker (1997)
Raise the Titanic! (1976), Clive Cussler	Raise the Titanic (1980)
Ramrod (1943), Luke Short	Ramrod (1947)
Random Hearts (1984), Warren Adler	Random Hearts (1999)
Rascal (1963), Sterling North	Rascal (1969)
Ratman's Notebooks (1969), Stephen Gilbert	Willard (1971)
Ratman's Notebooks (1969), Stephen Gilbert	Ben (1972)
Ratman's Notebooks (1969), Stephen Gilbert	Willard (2003)
The Razor's Edge (1944), W. Somerset Maugham	The Razor's Edge (1946)
The Razor's Edge (1944), W. Somerset Maugham	The Razor's Edge (1984)
The Reader (1995), Bernhard Schlink	The Reader (2008)
Ready Player One (2011), Ernest Cline	Ready Player One (2018)
Rebecca (1938), Daphne du Maurier	Rebecca (1940)
Rebecca (1938), Daphne du Maurier	Kohra (1964)
Rebecca (1938), Daphne du Maurier	Rebecca (2020)
The Rebel Outlaw: Josey Wales (1973) (a.k.a. Gone to Texas), Asa Earl Carter (Note: Written as Forrest Carter.)	The Outlaw Josey Wales (1976)
Red Alert (1958), Peter George	Dr. Strangelove or: How I Learned to Stop Worrying and Love the Bomb (1964)
Red Dragon (1981), Thomas Harris	Manhunter (1986)
Red Dragon (1981), Thomas Harris	Red Dragon (2002)
Red Hugh: Prince of Donegal (1957), Robert T. Reilly	The Fighting Prince of Donegal (1966)
The Red Pony (1937), John Steinbeck	The Red Pony (1949)
The Red Pony (1937), John Steinbeck	The Red Pony (1973)
The Redhead from Sun Dog (1930), W. C. Tuttle	Range Feud (1931)
The Redhead from Sun Dog (1930), W. C. Tuttle	The Red Rider (1934)
Reflections in a Golden Eye (1941), Carson McCullers	Reflections in a Golden Eye (1967)
Regretting You (2019), Colleen Hoover	Regretting You (2025)
The Reincarnation of Peter Proud (1973), Max Simon Ehrlich	The Reincarnation of Peter Proud (1975)
The Reivers (1962), William Faulkner	The Reivers (1969)
The Remains of the Day (1989), Ishiguro	The Remains of the Day (1993)
Remarkably Bright Creatures (2022), Shelby Van Pelt	Remarkably Bright Creatures (2026)
Reminders of Him (2022), Colleen Hoover	Reminders of Him (2026)
Rendezvous in Black (1948), Cornell Woolrich	Seven Blood-Stained Orchids (1972)
The Rescuers (1959), Margery Sharp	The Rescuers (1977)
The Rescuers (1959), Margery Sharp	The Rescuers Down Under (1990)
The Return of Sherlock Holmes (1905) (Note: Short story collection; stories adapted from this work in order: "The Adventure of the Empty House" (1903), "The Adventure of the Dancing Men" (1903), "The Adventure of Charles Augustus Milverton" (1904) and "The Adventure of the Six Napoleons" (1904).), Arthur Conan Doyle	The Return of Sherlock Holmes (1929) (Note: The film shares the title of the book; however, the plot was adapted from two different works, "The Adventure of the Dying Detective" and "His Last Bow. The War Service of Sherlock Holmes" (both 1913).)
The Return of Sherlock Holmes (1905), Arthur Conan Doyle	The Sleeping Cardinal (1931)
The Return of Sherlock Holmes (1905), Arthur Conan Doyle	The Missing Rembrandt (1932)
The Return of Sherlock Holmes (1905), Arthur Conan Doyle	Sherlock Holmes and the Secret Weapon (1942)
The Return of Sherlock Holmes (1905), Arthur Conan Doyle	The Pearl of Death (1944)
The Return of the Condor Heroes (神鵰俠侶; Shén Diāo Xiá Lǚ) (1959), Jin Yong	The Great Heroes (1960–61)
The Return of the Condor Heroes (神鵰俠侶; Shén Diāo Xiá Lǚ) (1959), Jin Yong	The Brave Archer and His Mate (1982)
The Return of the Condor Heroes (神鵰俠侶; Shén Diāo Xiá Lǚ) (1959), Jin Yong	Little Dragon Maiden (楊過與小龍女; Yáng Guò Yǔ Xiǎo Lóng Nǚ) (1983)
Return of the Living Dead (1977) (Note: Only the title of the work was used, the film which shared its title has nothing to do with the overall source material.), John Russo	The Return of the Living Dead (1985)
Return of the Living Dead (1977), John Russo	Return of the Living Dead Part II (1988)
Return of the Living Dead (1977), John Russo	Return of the Living Dead 3 (1993)
Return of the Living Dead (1977), John Russo	Return of the Living Dead: Necropolis (2005)
Return of the Living Dead (1977), John Russo	Return of the Living Dead: Rave to the Grave (2005)
The Return of the Native (1878), Thomas Hardy	The Return of the Native (1994)
The Return of the Native (1878), Thomas Hardy	The Return of the Native (2010)
The Return of the Soldier (1918), Rebecca West	The Return of the Soldier (1982)
Return to Paradise (1951) (Note: Short story collection; stories adapted from this work in order: "Mr. Morgan" and "Until They Sail".), James A. Michener	Return to Paradise (1953)
Return to Paradise (1951), James A. Michener	Until They Sail (1957)
Return to Peyton Place (1959), Grace Metalious	Return to Peyton Place (1961)
Reuben, Reuben (1964), Peter De Vries	Reuben, Reuben (1970)
Revolt (1929), Mary C. McCall, Jr.	Scarlet Dawn (1932)
The Revolt of Mamie Stover (1951), William Bradford Huie	The Revolt of Mamie Stover (1956)
Revolutionary Road (1961), Richard Yates	Revolutionary Road (2008)
The Riddle of the Sands: A Record of Secret Service (1903), Erskine Childers	The Riddle of the Sands (1979)
The Riddle of the Sands: A Record of Secret Service (1903), Erskine Childers	The Riddle of the Sands (German: Das Rätsel der Sandbank) (1985)
Riders of the Purple Sage (1912), Zane Grey	Riders of the Purple Sage (1918)
Riders of the Purple Sage (1912), Zane Grey	Riders of the Purple Sage (1925)
Riders of the Purple Sage (1912), Zane Grey	Riders of the Purple Sage (1931)
Riders of the Purple Sage (1912), Zane Grey	Riders of the Purple Sage (1941)
Riders of the Purple Sage (1912), Zane Grey	Riders of the Purple Sage (1996)
Ring (リング, Ringu) (1991), Koji Suzuki	Ring: Kanzenban (1995)
Ring (リング, Ringu) (1991), Koji Suzuki	Ring (1998)
Ring (リング, Ringu) (1991), Koji Suzuki	Ring 2 (1999) (Note: Sequel to the 1998 film.)
Ring (リング, Ringu) (1991), Koji Suzuki	The Ring Virus (Korean: 링; RR: Ring) (1999)
Ring (リング, Ringu) (1991), Koji Suzuki	The Ring (2002)
Ring (リング, Ringu) (1991), Koji Suzuki	The Ring Two (2005) (Note: Sequel to the 2002 film.)
Ring (リング, Ringu) (1991), Koji Suzuki	Sadako DX (2022) (Note: Based on characters only.)
Ripley Under Ground (1970), Patricia Highsmith	Ripley Under Ground (2005)
Ripley's Game (1974), Patricia Highsmith	The American Friend (German: Der amerikanische Freund) (1977)
Ripley's Game (1974), Patricia Highsmith	Ripley's Game (2002)
Rising Sun (1992), Michael Crichton	Rising Sun (1993)
The River (1946), Rumer Godden	The River (1951)
Riverworld (1971–1983) (series), Philip José Farmer	Riverworld (2003)
Riverworld (1971–1983) (series), Philip José Farmer	Riverworld (2010)
The Road (2006), Cormac McCarthy	The Road (2009)
The Road Back (1931) (Note: Serialised 1930–1931, published as a book 1931.), Erich Maria Remarque	The Road Back (1937)
The Robbery (Spanish: El Asalto) (1956), Enrique Silberstein	El Asalto (The Robbery) (1960)
The Robe (1942), Lloyd C. Douglas	The Robe (1953)
The Robe (1942), Lloyd C. Douglas	Demetrius and the Gladiators (1954)
Robinson Crusoe (1719), Daniel Defoe	Robinson Crusoe (1916)
Robinson Crusoe (1719), Daniel Defoe	The Adventures of Robinson Crusoe (1922)
Robinson Crusoe (1719), Daniel Defoe	The Adventures of Robinson Crusoe (French: Les aventures de Robinson Crusoë) (1922)
Robinson Crusoe (1719), Daniel Defoe	Robinson Crusoe (1924)
Robinson Crusoe (1719), Daniel Defoe	Robinson Crusoe (1927)
Robinson Crusoe (1719), Daniel Defoe	Robinson Crusoe (Russian: Робинзон Крузо) (1947)
Robinson Crusoe (1719), Daniel Defoe	Miss Robin Crusoe (1953)
Robinson Crusoe (1719), Daniel Defoe	Adventures of Robinson Crusoe (1954)
Robinson Crusoe (1719), Daniel Defoe	Il naufrago del Pacifico (1962)
Robinson Crusoe (1719), Daniel Defoe	Robinson Crusoe on Mars (1964)
Robinson Crusoe (1719), Daniel Defoe	Lt. Robin Crusoe, U.S.N. (1966)
Robinson Crusoe (1719), Daniel Defoe	Robinson Crusoe (1970)
Robinson Crusoe (1719), Daniel Defoe	Robinson Crusoe (1972)
Robinson Crusoe (1719), Daniel Defoe	Robinson Crusoe (Russian: Жизнь и удивительные приключения Робинзона Крузо) (1973)
Robinson Crusoe (1719), Daniel Defoe	Robinson y Viernes en la isla encantada (1973) (Note: Sequel to the 1970 film.)
Robinson Crusoe (1719), Daniel Defoe	Robinson Crusoe (Italian: Il racconto della giungla) (1974)
Robinson Crusoe (1719), Daniel Defoe	Man Friday (1975)
Robinson Crusoe (1719), Daniel Defoe	Robinson Crusoe Jr (1975)
Robinson Crusoe (1719), Daniel Defoe	The Erotic Adventures of Robinson Crusoe (1976)
Robinson Crusoe (1719), Daniel Defoe	Mr. Robinson (Italian: Il signor Robinson, mostruosa storia d'amore e d'avventure) (1976)
Robinson Crusoe (1719), Daniel Defoe	The Adventures of Robinson Crusoe (Portuguese: As Aventuras de Robinson Crusoé) (1978)
Robinson Crusoe (1719), Daniel Defoe	Robinson Crusoe mercante di York (1981)
Robinson Crusoe (1719), Daniel Defoe	Adventures of Robinson Crusoe, a Sailor from York (Czech: Dobrodružství Robinsona Crusoe, námořníka z Yorku) (1982)
Robinson Crusoe (1719), Daniel Defoe	Crusoe (1988)
Robinson Crusoe (1719), Daniel Defoe	Robinson and Company (French: Robinson et compagnie) (1991)
Robinson Crusoe (1719), Daniel Defoe	Robinson Crusoe (1997)
Robinson Crusoe (1719), Daniel Defoe	Robinson Crusoe (Greek: Rovinsonas Krousos) (2004)
Robinson Crusoe (1719), Daniel Defoe	Robinson Crusoe on Sin Island (2005)
Robinson Crusoe (1719), Daniel Defoe	Robinson Crusoe: The Great Blitzkrieg (2008)
Robinson Crusoe (1719), Daniel Defoe	Robinson Crusoe & Cuma (2015)
Robinson Crusoe (1719), Daniel Defoe	Robinson Crusoe (2016)
The Rocket to the Moon (German: Die Frau im Mond) (1928), Thea von Harbou	Woman in the Moon (German: Frau im Mond) (1929)
Rogue Cop (1954), William P. McGivern	Rogue Cop (1954)
The Romance of Rosy Ridge (1937), MacKinlay Kantor	The Romance of Rosy Ridge (1947)
Romance of the Three Kingdoms (三國演義; Sānguó Yǎnyì) (14th century), Luo Guanzhong	The Witty Sorcerer (左慈戲曹; Zuǒ Cí xì Cáo) (1931)
Romance of the Three Kingdoms (三國演義; Sānguó Yǎnyì) (14th century), Luo Guanzhong	Diao Chan (貂蟬; Diāo Chán) (1938)
Romance of the Three Kingdoms (三國演義; Sānguó Yǎnyì) (14th century), Luo Guanzhong	Diau Charn (貂蝉) (1958)
Romance of the Three Kingdoms (三國演義; Sānguó Yǎnyì) (14th century), Luo Guanzhong	Sangokushi (三国志) (1985)
Romance of the Three Kingdoms (三國演義; Sānguó Yǎnyì) (14th century), Luo Guanzhong	Sangokushi II: Amakakeru Otoko-tachi (三国志II 天翔ける英雄たち) (1986)
Romance of the Three Kingdoms (三國演義; Sānguó Yǎnyì) (14th century), Luo Guanzhong	Sangokushi (1): Eiyū-tachi no Yoake (三国志（第1部） 英雄たちの夜明け) (1992)
Romance of the Three Kingdoms (三國演義; Sānguó Yǎnyì) (14th century), Luo Guanzhong	Sangokushi (2): Chōkō Moyu! (三国志（第2部） 長江燃ゆ！) (1993)
Romance of the Three Kingdoms (三國演義; Sānguó Yǎnyì) (14th century), Luo Guanzhong	Sangokushi (3): Harukanaru Taichi (三国志（第3部） 遥かなる大地) (1994)
Romance of the Three Kingdoms (三國演義; Sānguó Yǎnyì) (14th century), Luo Guanzhong	Three Kingdoms: Resurrection of the Dragon (三國之見龍卸甲; Sān Guó Zhī Jiàn Lóng Xiè Jiǎ) (2008)
Romance of the Three Kingdoms (三國演義; Sānguó Yǎnyì) (14th century), Luo Guanzhong	Red Cliff (赤壁; Chì Bì) (2008–09)
Romance of the Three Kingdoms (三國演義; Sānguó Yǎnyì) (14th century), Luo Guanzhong	The Lost Bladesman (關雲長; Guān Yún cháng) (2011)
Romance of the Three Kingdoms (三國演義; Sānguó Yǎnyì) (14th century), Luo Guanzhong	The Assassins (铜雀台; Tóng Què Tái) (2012)
Romance of the Three Kingdoms (三國演義; Sānguó Yǎnyì) (14th century), Luo Guanzhong	Dynasty Warriors (真·三国无双; Zhēn Sān Guó Wú Shuāng) (2021)
A Room with a View (1908), E. M. Forster	A Room with a View (1985)
A Room with a View (1908), E. M. Forster	A Room with a View (2007)
The Roots of Heaven (1957), Romain Gary	The Roots of Heaven (1958)
Rosemary's Baby (1967), Ira Levin	Rosemary's Baby (1968)
Rosemary's Baby (1967), Ira Levin	Look What's Happened to Rosemary's Baby (1976)
The Rover (1923), Joseph Conrad	The Rover (1967)
The Ruined Map (燃え尽きた地図, Moetsukita chizu) (1967), Kōbō Abe	The Man Without a Map (1968)
The Rules of Attraction (1987), Bret Easton Ellis	The Rules of Attraction (2002)
Rum Punch (1992), Elmore Leonard	Jackie Brown (1997)
The Runaway Jury (1996), John Grisham	Runaway Jury (2003)
A Running Duck (a.k.a. Fair Game) (1974), Paula Gosling	Cobra (1986)
A Running Duck (a.k.a. Fair Game) (1974), Paula Gosling	Fair Game (1995)
The Running Man (1982), Stephen King	The Running Man (1987)
The Running Man (1982), Stephen King	The Running Man (2025)
The Russia House (1989), John le Carré	The Russia House (1990)

== See also ==
- Lists of works of fiction made into feature films
  - List of fiction works made into feature films (0–9, A–C)
  - List of fiction works made into feature films (D–J)
  - List of fiction works made into feature films (S–Z)
- Lists of literature made into feature films
  - List of short fiction made into feature films
  - List of children's books made into feature films
  - List of non-fiction works made into feature films
  - List of comics and comic strips made into feature films
  - List of plays adapted into feature films (disambiguation)
