= Savage Sam =

Savage Sam may refer to:

- Savage Sam (novel), a 1962 children's novel by Fred Gipson
- Savage Sam (film), a 1963 film based on the novel
