= Old Yeller =

1956 novel by Fred Gipson

- First edition (publ. Harper & Brothers)
- Author: Fred Gipson
- Language: English
- Publisher: Harper & Brothers
- Publication date: 1956
- LC Class: PZ3.G44122 Ol

Old Yeller is a 1956 children's novel written by Fred Gipson and illustrated by Carl Burger. It received a Newbery Honor in 1957. In 1957, Walt Disney released a film adaptation starring Tommy Kirk, Fess Parker, Dorothy McGuire, Kevin Corcoran, Jeff York, Chuck Connors, and Beverly Washburn.

== Plot ==
In the late 1860s, Travis Coates works to take care of his family ranch in the fictional settlement of Salt Licks, Mason County, Texas, with his mother and younger brother Arliss, while his father goes off to work on a cattle drive in Kansas, when a "dingy yellow" dog appears to the family and Travis reluctantly takes it in; naming him Old Yeller. The name has a double meaning: the fur color yellow pronounced as "yeller", and the fact that its bark sounds more like a human yell.

Travis initially loathes the "rascal" and at first tries to get rid of it, but the dog eventually proves his worth, saving the family on several occasions: rescuing Arliss from a bear, Travis from a bunch of wild hogs, and Mama and their friend Lisbeth from a wolf. Travis grows to love Old Yeller, and they become great friends. Soon, the rightful owner of Yeller shows up looking for his dog. He recognizes that the family has become attached to Yeller, so he trades the dog to Arliss for a horned toad and a home-cooked meal prepared by Travis' mother.

Suddenly, a rabid wolf attacks Travis' family, and when Old Yeller fights the wolf, he is bitten badly. Travis cannot risk Old Yeller becoming rabid and turning on the family, so he decides to shoot Old Yeller.

After Old Yeller's death, Travis discovers that he has sired puppies, and one helps Travis get over his tragic death. He and his family take in the new dog and make a fresh start.

== Breed ==
Old Yeller in the novel is described as being a "yellow cur". It has been claimed that the dog was actually modeled after the Yellow or Southern Black Mouth Cur or a Blue Lacy, the state dog of Texas. In the Disney film adaptation Yeller was portrayed by a yellow Labrador Retriever/Mastiff mix.

== Other books in the series ==
The new puppy becomes the title character of the follow-up book Savage Sam (1962) and 1963 film adaptation. A third book, Little Arliss (1978), is set after the first two and features Travis' younger brother.

== Adaptations ==
In 1973, Miller-Brody Productions recorded a dramatization of the book for Newbery Award Records. Narrated by Bob Kaliban, the dramatization featured Valerie Beaman, Earl Hammond, Scott Jacoby, Timothy Jerome, Linda Phillips, Sloane Shelton and Lawson Zerbe.

== Awards and honors ==
- 1957 Newbery Honor
- 1959 William Allen White Children's Book Award
- 1959 Young Reader's Choice Award
- 1959 Sequoyah Book Award, Children's category (inaugural winner)
- 1966 Nēnē Award
