= Old Yeller (film) =

1957 American film

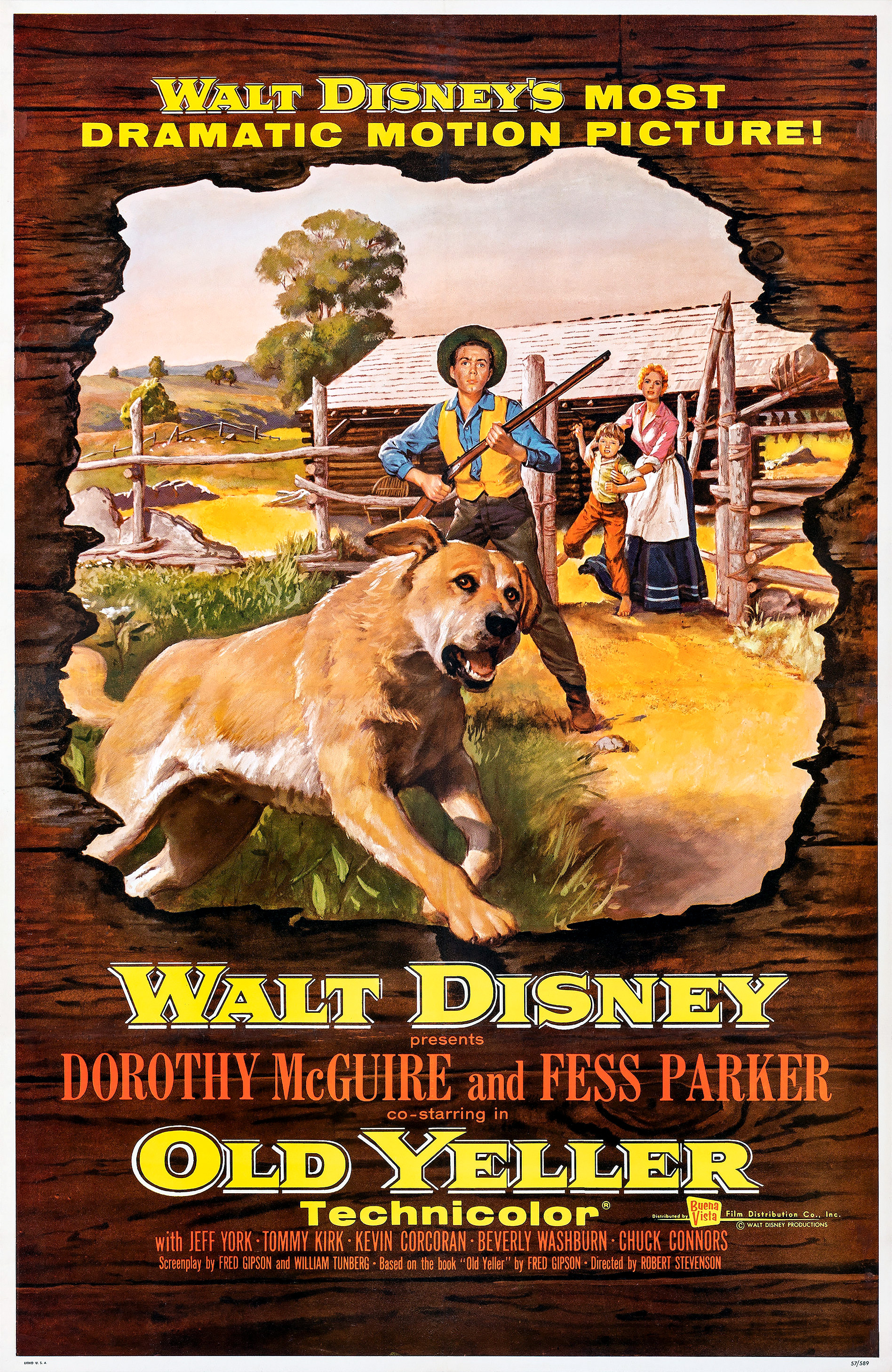
- Theatrical release poster
- Directed by: Robert Stevenson
- Screenplay by: Fred Gipson; William Tunberg
- Based on: Old Yeller by Fred Gipson
- Produced by: Walt Disney
- Starring: Dorothy McGuire; Fess Parker; Jeff York; Tommy Kirk; Kevin Corcoran; Beverly Washburn; Chuck Connors
- Cinematography: Charles P. Boyle
- Edited by: Stanley E. Johnson
- Music by: Oliver Wallace; Will Schaefer
- Color process: Technicolor
- Production company: Walt Disney Productions
- Distributed by: Buena Vista Distribution
- Release date: December 25, 1957
- Running time: 84 minutes
- Country: United States
- Language: English
- Box office: $6.25 million (U.S./Canada rentals)

Old Yeller is a 1957 American Western drama film directed by Robert Stevenson and produced by Walt Disney. It stars Dorothy McGuire and Fess Parker, with Tommy Kirk, Kevin Corcoran and Chuck Connors. It is about a boy and a stray dog in post-Civil War Texas. The film is based upon the 1956 novel by Fred Gipson, who co-wrote the screenplay with William Tunberg.

Old Yeller was released on December 25, 1957, to critical acclaim and was a commercial success, becoming the fifth highest-grossing film of 1957 and earning $6.25 million in the United States and Canada. The film's success led to a 1963 sequel, Savage Sam, which was based on a 1962 book by Gipson. In 2019, the film was selected for preservation into the United States National Film Registry by the Library of Congress for being "culturally, historically, or aesthetically significant".

== Plot ==
In the late 1860s, Jim Coates leaves his family—wife Katie, teenage son Travis and small son Arliss—to sell cattle in Kansas. While Jim is away, Travis sets off to work in the cornfield, where he encounters a Black Mouth Cur he names "Old Yeller", after the dialect pronunciation of "yellow" and the fact that the dog's bark resembles a human yell. Travis unsuccessfully tries to shoo the dog away, while Arliss defends him. Yeller's habit of stealing meat from smokehouses and robbing hens' nests does not endear him to Travis, but his mother agrees with the idea of Arliss having a dog.

Later, Arliss tries to capture a black bear cub by feeding it cornbread and grabbing it. Its angry mother hears her cub wailing and attacks, but Old Yeller frightens her away, winning over the family. Travis grows to love and respect Old Yeller, who comes to profoundly affect the boy's life.

Bud Searcy and his daughter, Lisbeth, come for supper one day and Lisbeth takes Travis aside to tell him Old Yeller has been stealing food all over the county. After she and Bud leave, Travis scolds Old Yeller, but the next day, Old Yeller proves himself as a cow dog by protecting Travis from Rose, their cow and restraining her while Travis milks her.

One day, Old Yeller's original master, Burn Sanderson, arrives looking for his dog. Realizing that the Coates family really needs Old Yeller, he agrees to trade him to Arliss for a horny toad and a home-cooked meal. Sanderson later takes Travis aside and warns him of the growing plague of hydrophobia (rabies) in the region.

One day, Travis sets out to trap a family of feral hogs. Advised by Bud Searcy, he sits in a tree, trying to rope them from above as Old Yeller corners them. However, Travis then falls into the group of hogs and one of them attacks him and injures his leg. Old Yeller defends Travis, but is also severely injured by the hog and Travis hides him in a large hole. Travis' mother then retrieves Old Yeller and uses mule hair to suture his wounds. As Old Yeller recovers, Searcy warns the Coates family of hydrophobia in the area but Katie chastises him for trying to scare Travis. Searcy leaves and Lisbeth stays with the Coateses to help them harvest corn. Travis assures Katie that the hogs were not rabid and both he and Old Yeller recover.

Later, a wolf suddenly attacks the family. Katie's scream alerts Travis, who runs outside with a rifle, just in time to see Old Yeller fighting off the wolf. Travis shoots the wolf, but not before Old Yeller is bitten by it. Katie tells Travis that because no healthy wolf would attack near a burning area, the wolf was rabid. Katie then suggests shooting Old Yeller, but Travis insists that they instead pen him in the corn crib to see if he shows symptoms of the disease. After remaining quarantined, the Coateses believe that Old Yeller escaped infection. One night, Travis goes to feed Old Yeller, only to notice he has rabies. Arliss wants to play with the dog but Travis harshly warns him not to. Arliss defiantly tries to open the corn crib and nearly does but their mother stops him when Yeller lunges. Katie tells Travis that Old Yeller is suffering and brings the rifle with her, but Travis takes it, saying that because Old Yeller is his dog, he must do it himself. He reluctantly shoots and kills Old Yeller before silently walking away.

Stricken with grief, Travis declines a new puppy sired by Old Yeller. Jim then returns with money and gifts for the family. Katie tells him about the dog and Jim discusses it with Travis. Upon returning to the farmhouse, Travis observes the puppy stealing a piece of meat, a habit inherited from Old Yeller. Travis then accepts the puppy, "Young Yeller", as his new dog.

== Cast ==
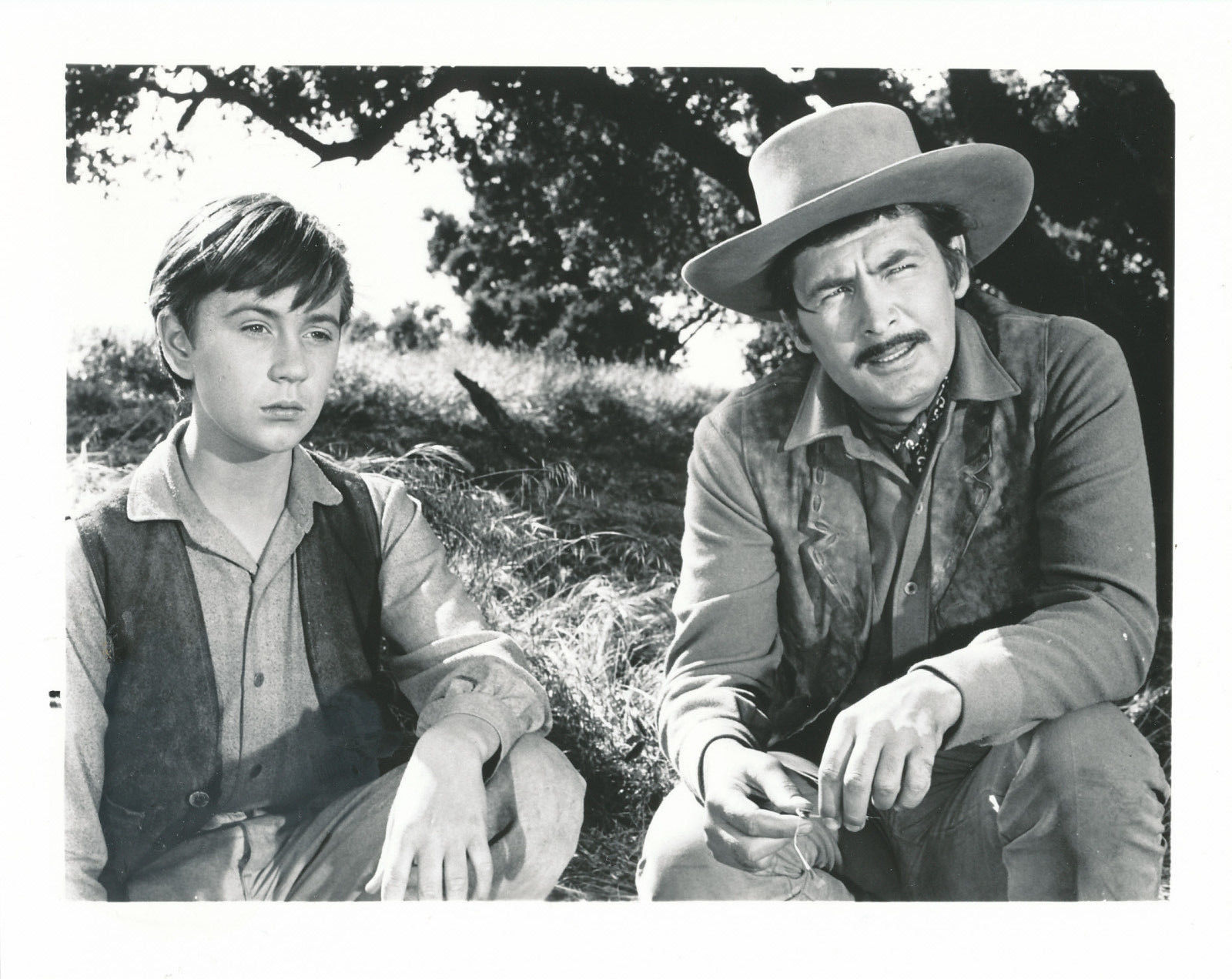
Promotional photo of Tommy Kirk and Fess Parker during filming.

- Spike as Old Yeller
- Fess Parker as Jim Coates
- Dorothy McGuire as Katie Coates
- Tommy Kirk as Travis Coates
- Kevin Corcoran as Arliss Coates
- Jeff York as Bud Searcy
- Beverly Washburn as Lisbeth Searcy
- Chuck Connors as Burn Sanderson

== Production ==
Some scenes were filmed on location at Lake Sherwood, California. Tommy Kirk later said "Fess Parker, at that time, was on the outs with Disney—I presume over money. This was simply his last contractual obligation and he only worked about three days on this film, but good, competent, professional that he is, he came in and did it. I think he helps the movie a lot. l liked Fess Parker very much; he was very nice to me."

== Comic book adaptation ==
The film was adapted into a 1957 comic book published by Dell Comics. It was issue #869 of Four Color comic series and was reprinted in 1965.

In 1959 Japan also released a comic adaption, drawn by Leiji Matsumoto. It is considered very rare nowadays.

== Reception ==
=== Box office ===
During its initial theatrical run, Old Yeller earned $5.9 million in box office rentals from the United States and Canada. The film was re-released in 1965 and earned an estimated $2 million in domestic rentals.

=== Criticism ===
Bosley Crowther of The New York Times praised the film's performers and called the film "a nice little family picture" that was a "lean and sensible screen transcription of Fred Gipson's children's book". He further described the film as a "warm, appealing little rustic tale [that] unfolds in lovely color photography. Sentimental, yes, but also sturdy as a hickory stick." Time magazine felt the "action, in short, is exciting for everybody, but all too often the dialogue is only for the very young", but they heralded the film as being "for the kids that adults will stay to enjoy themselves. Old Yeller propounds a major tenet of Disney philosophy: a dog should be a dog and a boy should act like a man."

Harrison's Reports wrote the film "is fine entertainment for all, even though it has a special appeal for the children". John L. Scott of the Los Angeles Times praised the two child actors for "their naturalness and ability", as well as Spike the dog, writing that he "may be well be the next movie star dog". In summary, he wrote that "[t]he production is not a great one; but it will bring families back to the theater."

=== Legacy ===
Old Yeller went on to become an important cultural film for baby boomers, with Old Yeller's death in particular being remembered as one of the most tearful scenes in cinematic history. On the review aggregator website Rotten Tomatoes, the film has an approval rating of 100% based on 18 reviews, with a weighted average of 8.1/10. The critical consensus reads: "Old Yeller is an exemplary coming of age tale, packing an emotional wallop through smart pacing and a keen understanding of the elemental bonding between humanity and their furry best friends". Metacritic, which uses a weighted average, assigned the film a score of 84 out of 100, based on 6 critics, indicating "universal acclaim". One critic cited it as "among the best, if not THE best" of the boy-and-his-dog films. Critic Jeff Walls wrote:

Old Yeller, like The Wizard of Oz, Star Wars, and Titanic has come to be more than just a movie; it has become a part of our culture. If you were to walk around asking random people, you would be hard-pressed to find someone who did not know the story of Old Yeller, someone who didn't enjoy it or someone who didn't cry. The movie's ending has become as famous as any other in film history.

== Sequel ==
In 1963, Walt Disney Productions released Savage Sam, the sequel to Old Yeller adapted from the book written by the same author, Fred Gipson. Norman Tokar directed the live-action movie, but it did not enjoy the success of its predecessor.

== See also ==
- List of American films of 1957
- Savage Sam

== Works cited ==
- Harford, Margaret (December 26, 1957). "'Old Yeller' Family Treat". Los Angeles Mirror. Los Angeles. p. Part B p.4. - Clipping at Newspapers.com
