= Carl Burger =

American painter and writer

- Born: June 18, 1888; Maryville, Tennessee
- Died: December 30, 1967 (aged 79); Pleasantville, New York
- Education: Maryville College; Stanford University; Cornell University
- Children: Knox Burger
- Parents: Joseph Burger (father); Elizabeth Knox (mother)

Carl V. Burger (June 18, 1888 – December 30, 1967) was an American "artist and writer of children's books about animals and natural history." He is known for his children's and youth literature illustrations of The Incredible Journey by Sheila Burnford and the Newbery Medal honor novels Old Yeller by Fred Gipson and Little Rascal by Sterling North.

== Early life ==
Burger was born in Maryville, Tennessee, to a banker, Joseph Burger and Elizabeth (Knox) Burger. He attended Maryville College and Stanford University prior to transferring to Cornell University, where he took his Bachelor of Architecture in 1912. At Cornell, Burger was art editor for the Cornell Era and the Cornellian. His mentor was the noted naturalist Louis Agassiz Fuertes. Burger later studied at the School of Museum of Fine Arts in Boston for three years.

== Artistic career ==
Prior to the First World War, he worked for The Boston Post, drawing sports and political cartoons, as well as illustrations for the Sunday edition. He married Margaret Rothery on September 18, 1920. The Burgers had one child, Knox Burger. Carl completed his national service in the United States Armed Forces between 1917 and 1920, rising to the rank of captain, United States Army. During this period he organized and directed the American Expeditionary Forces School of Painting in Beaune, France. The illustrations in The History of the Inter-Allied Games, published in Paris by the United States Army, were drawn under Burger's direction.

Carl Burger commenced his artistic career as an Art Director for N.W. Ayer and Sons, a New York-based advertising firm with offices in Philadelphia. He also worked for Edwin Bird Wilson, Inc., a financial advertising firm with offices in New York City and Chicago and Barton, Durstine & Osborn. During World War Two, he was the art director for the American Red Cross in Washington, D.C. Burger wrote and illustrated his own books as well as illustrating many books and magazines. These included All About Fish, published by Random House in 1965. Burger also contributed All About Dogs and All About Elephants. He also painted large murals for the Bronx Zoo and the New York Aquarium.

== Member ==
Burger was a member of the American Museum of Natural History, the New York Zoological Society, the Cornell Club of New York, the Phi Kappa Psi fraternity, and through that organization, the Irving Literary Society. He lived in Pleasantville, New York, at his death in 1967.
