= Jeff York =

American actor (1912–1995)

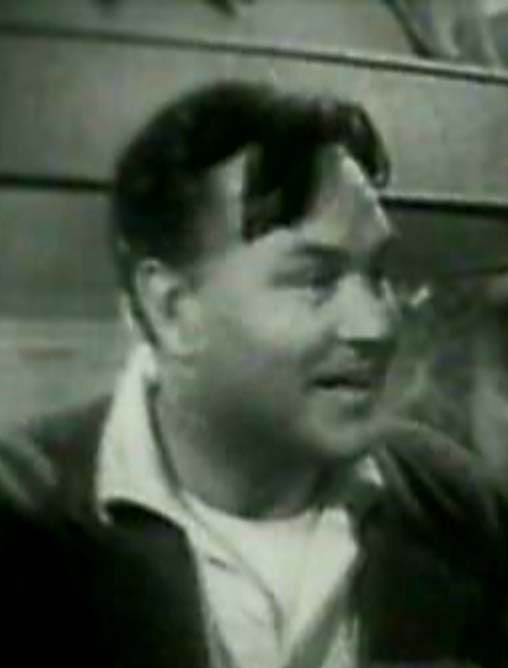
- York in The Lady Says No (1952)
- Born: Granville Owen Scofield; March 23, 1912; Los Angeles, California, U.S.
- Died: October 11, 1995 (aged 83); Woodland Hills, California, U.S.
- Occupation: Actor
- Years active: 1937–1967
- Spouse: Moselle Kimbler (m. 1936; div. 1941)

Jeff York (March 23, 1912 – October 11, 1995), also known as Granville Owen, was an American film and television actor who began his career in the late 1930s using his given name, Granville Owen Scofield. He was also sometimes credited as Jeff Yorke. He died in 1995, at age 83. Jeff stood 6'4".

== Career ==
York served in the U.S. Army during World War II. During his early career, the tall, dark-haired actor played characters such as Pat Ryan in the 1940 serial Terry and the Pirates and was given the lead in the 1940 film Li'l Abner. However, he is perhaps most remembered for his role as Bud Searcy in Disney's classic Old Yeller and its 1963 sequel Savage Sam. Beverly Washburn played Lisbeth Searcy, Bud's daughter. York also appeared in The Great Locomotive Chase, Westward Ho, the Wagons!, and Johnny Tremain which were all Walt Disney's productions.

York attracted considerable attention in the mid 1950s with his television portrayal of Mike Fink, the flamboyant keelboat operator in two episodes of Disney's hugely popular Davy Crockett miniseries in the episodes "Davy Crockett's Keelboat Race" and "Davy Crockett and the River Pirates." York was cast opposite Fess Parker in the role. The first episode featured a memorable boasting contest and a keelboat race, with Fink's boat named The Gullywumper; in the second, Crockett and Fink join forces to fight a band of river pirates who blame their depredations on local Indians.

Girls run and hide, brave men shiver...I'm Mike Fink, king of the river!

He also starred as mountain man/fur trapper Joe Crane in two different Disney series, The Saga of Andy Burnett, adapted from the Stewart Edward White novel The Long Rifle and Zorro.

You see before you Joe Crane, as big as life and twice as nasty!

In addition, York was a guest star of The Lone Ranger (2 episodes), Waterfront, Studio 57, Medic, Fireside Theater, You Are There (2 episodes), The Californians, Peter Gunn, Bronco, Lawman (2 episodes), Cheyenne, The Rifleman, Outlaws, Perry Mason (3 episodes), Daniel Boone, Zorro (3 episodes), and The Iron Horse.

He co-starred as "Reno McKee" with Roger Moore, Dorothy Provine, and Ray Danton in the 1959 ABC/Warner Brothers western television series, The Alaskans.

Among his three appearances on Perry Mason, York played roles as the defendant in two 1961 episodes: Pete Mallory in "The Case of the Difficult Detour", and Scott Cahill in "The Case of the Traveling Treasure." In 1964, he played murderer and title character Ross Walker in "The Case of the Arrogant Arsonist."

== Filmography ==
- 1937: Kid Galahad – Reporter (uncredited)
- 1937: The Devil's Saddle Legion – Chris Madden
- 1937: That Certain Woman – Reporter (uncredited)
- 1937: Alcatraz Island – (uncredited)
- 1937: The Adventurous Blonde – Dr. Nally
- 1937: Expensive Husbands – Announcer at Polo Game (uncredited)
- 1938: Start Cheering – Student (uncredited)
- 1940: Terry and the Pirates – Pat Ryan
- 1940: Golden Gloves – George Swift (uncredited)
- 1940: Li'l Abner – Li'l Abner
- 1941: Sunny – Jim Day
- 1942: Nazi Agent – Keeler (uncredited)
- 1942: Kid Glove Killer – Henchman (uncredited)
- 1945: They Were Expendable – Ens. Tony Aiken
- 1946: Up Goes Maisie – Elmer Sauders
- 1946: The Postman Always Rings Twice – Blair
- 1946: Little Miss Big – Clancy
- 1946: The Yearling – Oliver Hutto (uncredited)
- 1946: Alias Mr. Twilight – Police Lt. Barton
- 1947: Fear in the Night – Deputy Torrence
- 1947: Blondie's Anniversary – Paul Madison (Class of '32)
- 1947: Unconquered – Wide-Shouldered Bond Slave (uncredited)
- 1948: Panhandle – Jack
- 1948: Isn't It Romantic? – Elmer – Burly Gent
- 1948: The Three Musketeers – Officer (uncredited)
- 1948: The Paleface – Big Joe
- 1949: Knock on Any Door – Man (uncredited)
- 1949: Special Agent – Jake Rumpler
- 1949: Samson and Delilah – Spectator at Temple (uncredited)
- 1949: The Inspector General – Guard (uncredited)
- 1950: Kill the Umpire – Panhandle Jones (uncredited)
- 1950: Father of the Bride – Policeman (uncredited)
- 1950: The Asphalt Jungle – Policeman (uncredited)
- 1950: Surrender – Canning
- 1950: Watch the Birdie – Mr. Tirson (uncredited)
- 1950: Short Grass – Curley
- 1951: The Redhead and the Cowboy – Lt. Wylie (uncredited)
- 1951: The Unknown Man – Jail Guard (uncredited)
- 1951: The Lady Says No – Goose
- 1952: The Duel at Silver Creek – Abe Cooney (uncredited)
- 1952: Kansas City Confidential – Captain McBride (uncredited)
- 1954: Demetrius and the Gladiators – Albus (uncredited)
- 1955: It's a Dog's Life – John L. Sullivan (uncredited)
- 1956: The Great Locomotive Chase – William Campbell
- 1956: Westward Ho, the Wagons! – Hank Breckenridge
- 1956: Davy Crockett and the River Pirates (TV Series) – Mike Fink
- 1957: Johnny Tremain – James Otis
- 1957: Old Yeller – Bud Searcy
- 1959: Zorro (TV Series) - John Crane
- 1961: Perry Mason - Episode- The Case of The Traveling Treasure Scot Cahill
- 1962: The Rifleman - Mack
- 1963: Savage Sam – Bud Searcy
- 1967: Tammy and the Millionaire – Grundy Onyx Purewater Tate (final film role)
