= Little Arliss =

1978 novel by Fred Gipson

- First edition
- Author: Fred Gipson
- Illustrator: Ronald Himler
- Language: English
- Genre: Children's literature
- Publisher: Harper & Row
- Publication date: May 1, 1978
- Publication place: United States
- Media type: Print (hardcover)
- Pages: 83 pages (first edition, hardcover)
- ISBN: 0-06-022008-2 (first edition, hardcover)
- Preceded by: Savage Sam

Little Arliss (1978) is the third book centered on the Coates family of frontier Texas by Fred Gipson. It follows Old Yeller (1956) and Savage Sam (1962), and focuses on Little Arliss, the youngest member of the family. Like the first two novels, it is told in the first person, this time by Arliss, instead of Travis.

== Plot ==
Rock-throwing Little Arliss Coates is now twelve years old and tired of his nickname and the condescension of adults. His older brother Travis has married Lisbeth Searcy and they rarely come around, as both are "busy being married". Little Arliss chafes at having to attend school, and constantly gets into trouble with his teacher, whom he derisively calls "Old Hoot Owl". One day he discovers that settlers heading west have camped near his home. Approaching the encampment, he befriends Judy Sanders, also about twelve, an orphan traveling with her uncle and aunt, and they decide to attempt to catch an "outlaw" horse that roams the territory—one which has eluded capture by Jim Coates (Arliss' Papa), Burn Sanderson (original owner of "Old Yeller"), Bud Searcy, Wiley Crouch, and other men. Sanderson goes so far as to promise Arliss he can keep the horse if he captures it.

The two children are successful, and Arliss eventually rides the "man-killer", which he dubs "Salty". Despite this, Papa will not allow him to keep the horse, as he considers it too dangerous. Judy wants to marry Arliss, but her uncle convinces her that they are not old enough (to Arliss' relief).

Arliss ends his narrative determined once again to show the grown-ups that he is as tough and as smart as they are.

== Background ==
- This twenty-thousand-word novella was discovered in Fred Gipson's papers by his son Thomas Beckton Gipson.
- Like the first two books, this one was also filmed, but as a children's television special, instead of a theatrically released motion picture, in 1984.
