= Savage Sam (novel) =

1962 novel by Fred Gipson

- First edition
- Author: Fred Gipson
- Illustrator: Carl Burger
- Language: English
- Genre: Children's literature
- Publisher: Harper & Row
- Publication date: 1962
- Publication place: United States
- Media type: Print (hardcover and paperback)
- Pages: 151 pages (paperback); 160 pages (hardcover)
- OCLC: 732819039
- Preceded by: Old Yeller
- Followed by: Little Arliss

Savage Sam is a 1962 children's novel written by Fred Gipson, his second book concerning the Coates family of frontier Texas in the late 1860s. It is a sequel to 1956's Old Yeller. It was inspired by the story of former Apache captive Herman Lehmann, whom Gipson had seen give an exhibition when he was a child. It was adapted into a 1963 motion picture of the same name.

== Plot ==
Savage Sam is Old Yeller's son. He is a Bluetick Coonhound, and every bit as courageous and loyal as his father, as well as an incredibly keen tracker. Sam mostly likes chasing bobcats, sometimes with Arliss.

Travis and Arliss Coates and Lisbeth Searcy are taken captive by Apache and Comanche Indians. Jim Coates, the boys' father, gathers up some neighboring men to go in search of them, which includes Lisbeth's somewhat overbearing grandfather, Bud Searcy. Travis manages to escape and is found by the search party (partly thanks to Sam's keen sense of smell), and they rescue Arliss and Lisbeth days later.

== Other books in the series ==
A follow-up novella, Little Arliss, was discovered in Fred Gipson's papers by his son, and published in 1978.
