= Fred Gipson =

American author (1908–1973)

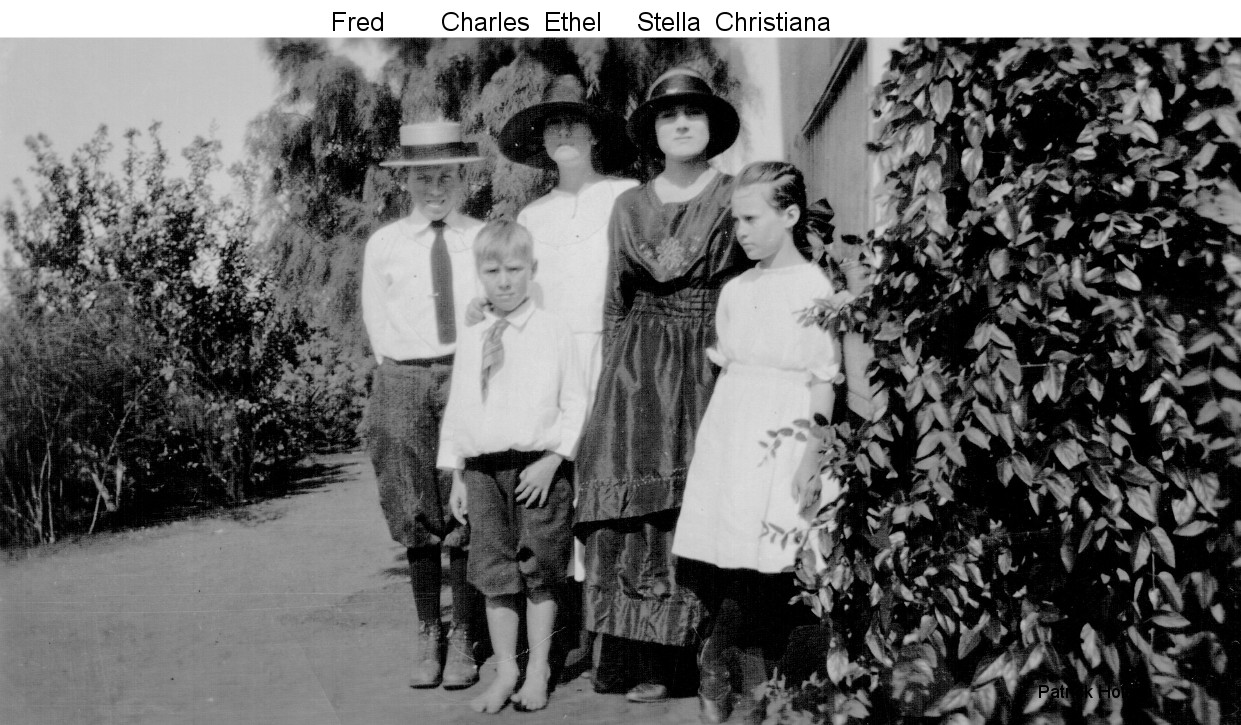
- Fred (left) and siblings
- Born: February 7, 1908
- Died: August 14, 1973 (aged 65)
- Occupations: Writer and screenwriter
- Writing career
- Notable work: Old Yeller (1956); Savage Sam (1962)

Frederick Benjamin Gipson (February 7, 1908 – August 14, 1973) was an American writer and screenwriter. He is best known for writing the 1956 novel Old Yeller, which became a popular 1957 Walt Disney film. Gipson was born on a farm near Mason in the Texas Hill Country, the son of Beck Gipson and Emma Deishler. After working at a variety of farming and ranching jobs, he enrolled in 1933 at the University of Texas at Austin. There he wrote for the Daily Texan and The Ranger, but he left school before graduating to become a newspaper journalist.

== Writings ==
In the 1940s, Gipson began writing short stories with a western theme, which proved to be prototypes for his longer works of fiction that followed. In 1946, his first full-length book, The Fabulous Empire: Colonel Zack Miller's Story, was published.

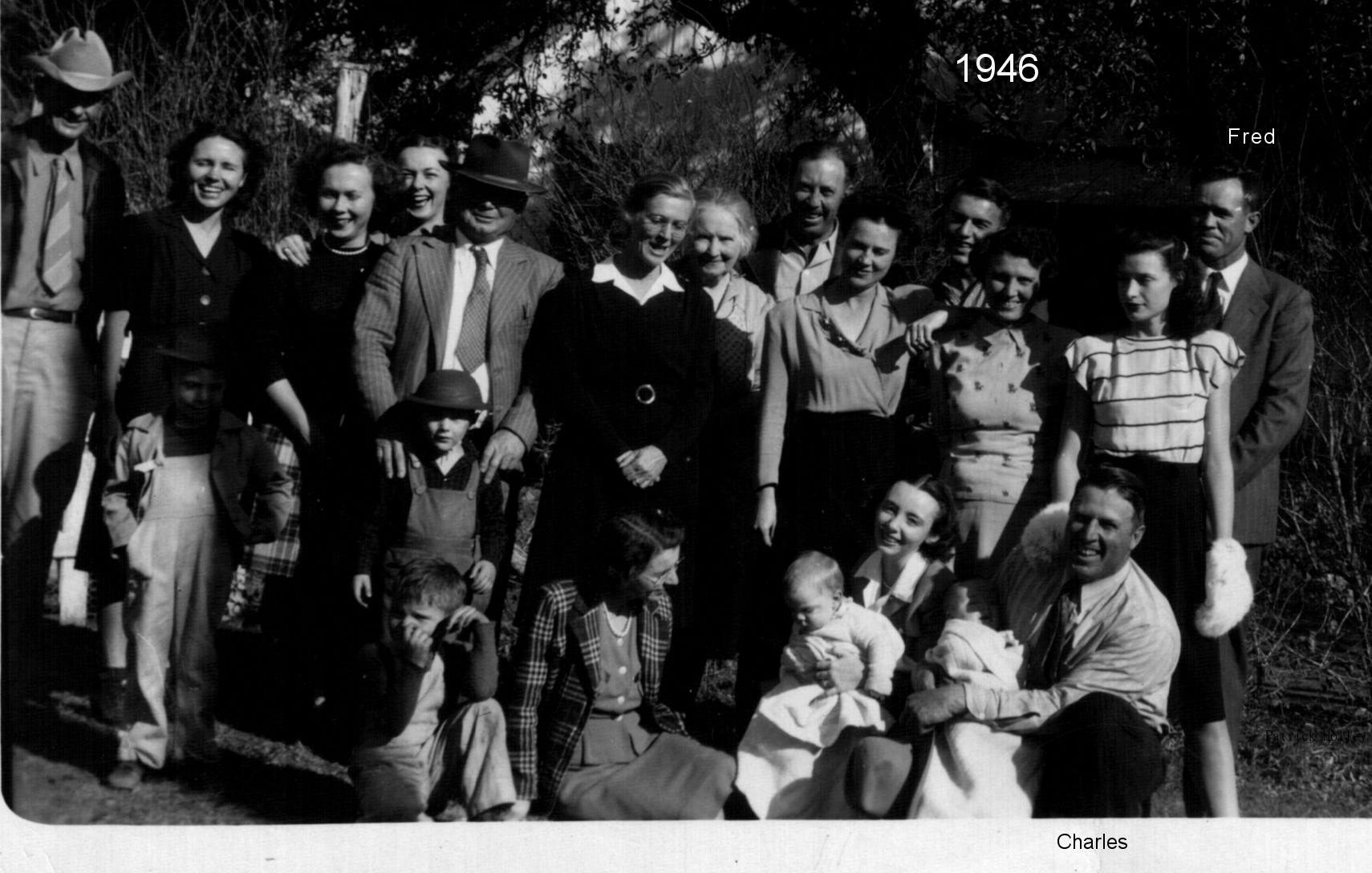
Fred (on right) celebrating after book release.

Hound-Dog Man, published in 1947, established Gipson's reputation when it became a Doubleday Book-of-the-Month Club selection and sold over 250,000 copies in its first year of publication. It was made into a film in 1959. His additional works included The Home Place (later filmed as Return of the Texan, a 1952 Western starring Dale Robertson and Joanne Dru), Big Bend: A Homesteader's Story, Cowhand: The Story of a Working Cowboy, The Trail-Driving Rooster, and Recollection Creek.

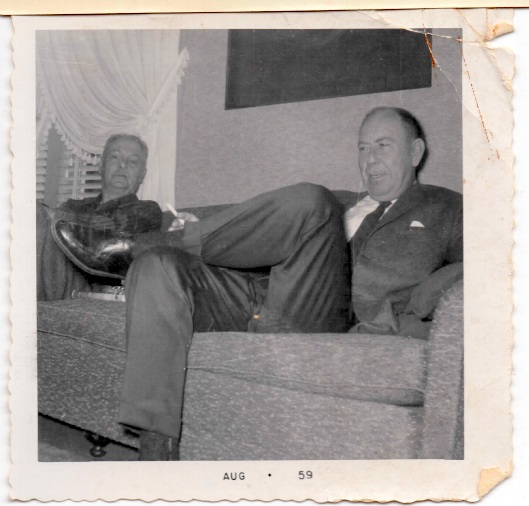
Fred Gipson visiting family in Sand Springs Oklahoma in 1959

His novel Old Yeller won the Newbery honor, and was adapted into a 1957 Walt Disney Studios film. Old Yeller has two sequels – Savage Sam (1962), which also became a Walt Disney film in 1963, and Little Arliss, published posthumously in 1978. Old Yeller was the novel that Gipson considered his best work. Set in the Texas Hill Country in the 1860s just after the American Civil War, the story is about the 14-year-old boy Travis Coates (played by Tommy Kirk in the film) left in charge of the household while his father is away. Old Yeller, a stray dog adopted by the boy, helps in the formidable task of protecting the family on the Texas Ranch. Old Yeller was based on a Deishler family dog named "Rattler" and unlike Old Yeller, Rattler was a dark-colored Border Collie.

== Personal life ==
Fred Gipson was born in Comanche Creek, Texas, the fifth son of poor cotton farmers. In his early life, he worked a variety of physical jobs in the outdoors while writing on the side. He displayed both literary talent and a short temper from a young age. On January 23, 1940, he married Tommie Wynn in San Angelo, Texas. They had two sons.

In 1956, Gipson's most successful literary work, Old Yeller, was published. Filming for the Walt Disney-produced movie based upon the story began the same year. By this time, Gipson was suffering from physical ailments, depression, and alcoholism.

On June 14, 1962, Mike Gipson, Fred Gipson's son, found the Gipson family dog, the inspiration for Savage Sam, chained and clubbed to death in a shed behind the new family home. The next day, Mike returned to university in shock, and committed suicide that weekend. Gipson's wife left him a month after the premiere of Savage Sam.

Gipson died in his Mason County, Texas home on August 14, 1973.

== Bibliography ==
- Fabulous Empire: Colonel Zack Miller's Story. Boston: Houghton Mifflin, 1946.
- Hound-Dog Man. New York: Harper, 1949.
- Circle Round the Wagons. London: Michael Joseph, 1949. UK edition of Hound-Dog Man.
- The Home Place. New York: Harper, 1950.
- Big Bend: A Homesteader's Story (with J.O. Langford). Austin: University of Texas Press, 1952.
- Cowhand: the story of a working cowboy. New York: Harper, 1953.
- The Trail-Driving Rooster. New York: Harper, 1955.
- Recollection Creek. New York: Harper, 1955.
- Old Yeller. New York: Harper, 1956.
- The "Cow Killers": with the Aftosa Commission in Mexico. Austin: University of Texas Press, 1956.
- Recollection Creek, revised for young people. New York: Harper, 1959.
- Savage Sam. New York: Harper, 1962.
- Little Arliss. New York: Harper, 1978.
- Curly and the Wild Boar. New York: Harper, 1979.
- Hound-Dog Man. Lincoln: University of Nebraska Press, 1980.
