= Savage Sam (film) =

1963 film by Norman Tokar

- Theatrical release poster
- Directed by: Norman Tokar
- Written by: Fred Gipson; William Turberg
- Based on: Savage Sam by Fred Gipson
- Produced by: Bill Anderson (co-producer)
- Starring: Brian Keith; Tommy Kirk; Marta Kristen; Kevin Corcoran; Dewey Martin; Jeff York; Rafael Campos
- Cinematography: Edward Colman
- Edited by: Grant K. Smith
- Music by: Oliver Wallace
- Color process: Technicolor
- Production company: Walt Disney Productions
- Distributed by: Buena Vista Distribution
- Release date: June 1, 1963
- Running time: 103 minutes
- Country: United States
- Language: English
- Box office: $3,000,000 (U.S./Canada)

Savage Sam is a 1963 American Western film sequel to Old Yeller based on the 1962 novel of the same name by Fred Gipson. Norman Tokar directed the live-action film, which was released by Walt Disney Productions on June 1, 1963. It did not enjoy the success of the original.

== Plot ==
In 1870, 18-year-old Travis Coates is left in charge of his precocious 12-year-old brother, Arliss, on the family farm in Southwest Texas, while their parents visit an ailing grandmother. While Arliss and his dog, Savage Sam, are tracking a bobcat, Travis is warned by Bud Searcy that renegade Apaches are in the area. When Travis joins Bud's 17-year-old daughter, Lisbeth, in a search for Arliss, all three are captured by a band of Apaches led by a Comanche. The boys' Uncle Beck Coates witnesses the scene and manages to wound the leader, but Beck's horse is shot by one of the braves, allowing the Comanche and his followers to escape with the captives. Beck alerts the U. S. Cavalry, but the Indians split into three groups and ride for the hills; in the confusion, Travis escapes but is knocked unconscious and left to die. Beck and his posse of five find Travis and his dog, set out in pursuit of the other captives, and eventually find the Indians in a valley fighting over Lisbeth. Although posse member Pack Underwood, bent on revenge for the massacre of his family, fires a shot that alerts the Indians to their planned ambush, the youngsters are saved and the renegades captured.

== Cast ==
- Brian Keith as Uncle Beck Coates
- Tommy Kirk as Travis Coates
- Kevin Corcoran as Arliss Coates
- Dewey Martin as Lester White
- Jeff York as Bud Searcy
- Marta Kristen as Lisbeth Searcy
- Rafael Campos as Young Warrior
- Slim Pickens as Willy Crup
- Royal Dano as Pack Underwood
- Rodolfo Acosta as Bandy Legs
- Pat Hogan as Broken Nose
- Dean Fredericks as Comanche Chief
- Brad Weston as Ben Todd

== Behind the scenes ==
Walt Disney bought the film rights to the novel in September 1961, prior to its publication in February 1962. The price was $25,000.

Gipson was then hired to write the screenplay. He started in October at $1,250 a week. Gipson was an alcoholic by this time and he was frequently incapacitated by rages.

On June 14, 1962, Mike Gipson, Fred Gipson's son, found the Gipson family dog, the inspiration for Savage Sam, chained and clubbed to death in a shed behind the new family home. The next day, Mike returned to university in shock, and committed suicide that weekend. Gipson's wife would leave him a month after the premiere of Savage Sam.

It was one of the first films from director Norman Tokar. Walt Disney said, "I got him from TV. I like young talent. When people get to be institutions, they direct pictures with their left hand and do something else with their right."

Pat Hogan appears as tribesman Broken Nose. Dean Fredericks, formerly Steve Canyon on NBC, played a Comanche chief in this film.

Filming started August 6, 1962. It was mostly shot around the San Fernando Valley.

== Critical reception ==
The film received poor reviews and fell short of box office expectations, paling in comparison with Old Yeller. According to Gipson's biographer, "criticized as clichéd and overdirected, the production was especially faulted for inconsistency with Gipson's tone".

The Washington Post called it a "dogged, listless effort". Los Angeles Times called it "action melodrama with a formula plot". The Chicago Tribune said "the members of the cast are all capable enough, but they are all handicapped by a lurid plot which looks like it was made up by all the action scenes in a bunch of old television scripts."

== See also ==
- List of American films of 1963
- Old Yeller, 1957 film

== Bibliography ==
- Lich, Glen E. (1990). Fred Gipson at work. Texas A & M University Press. ISBN 9780890964248.
