= List of fiction works made into feature films (S–Z) =

This is a list of works of fiction that have been made into feature films, from S to Z. The title of the work and the year it was published are both followed by the work's author, the title of the film, and the year of the film. If a film has an alternate title based on geographical distribution, the title listed will be that of the widest distribution area.

== S ==
Fiction work(s)	Film adaptation(s)
Sackett (1961) (Note: Conflated with another work The Daybreakers (1960) by the same author for the film adaptation.), Louis L'Amour	The Sacketts (1979) (Note: Television film.)
Sacred Wood (Chinese: 神木, romanized: Shen Mu) (1999), Liu Qingbang	Blind Shaft (Chinese: 盲井; pinyin: Mángjǐng) (2003)
The Saga of Pecos Bill (1923), Edward O'Reilly	Melody Time (1948)
The Saga of Pecos Bill (1923), Edward O'Reilly	Whiskey and Ghosts (Italian: Whiskey e fantasmi) (1974)
The Saga of Pecos Bill (1923), Edward O'Reilly	Tall Tale (1995)
Sahara (1992), Clive Cussler	Sahara (2005)
The Sailor Who Fell from Grace with the Sea (Japanese: 午後の曳航, romanized: Gogo no eiko) (1963), Yukio Mishima	The Sailor Who Fell from Grace with the Sea (1976)
Saint Jack (1973), Paul Theroux	Saint Jack (1979)
Saint Johnson (1930), W. R. Burnett	Law and Order (1932)
Saint Johnson (1930), W. R. Burnett	Wild West Days (1937)
The Salamander (1973), Morris West	The Salamander (1981)
'Salem's Lot (1975), Stephen King	Salem's Lot (1979)
'Salem's Lot (1975), Stephen King	A Return to Salem's Lot (1987)
'Salem's Lot (1975), Stephen King	'Salem's Lot (2024)
Salmon Fishing in the Yemen (2006), Paul Torday	Salmon Fishing in the Yemen (2011)
A Salute to the Great Macarthy (1970), Barry Oakley	The Great Macarthy (1975)
Sanctuary (1931), William Faulkner	The Story of Temple Drake (1933)
The Sand Pebbles (1962), Richard McKenna	The Sand Pebbles (1966)
Sanshirō (Japanese: 三四郎) (1908), Natsume Sōseki	Natsume Sōseki's Sanshirō (Japanese: 夏目漱石の三四郎, romanized: Sōseki Natsume no Sanshirō) (1955)
Sanshiro Sugata (Japanese: 姿三四郎, romanized: Sugata Sanshirō) (1942), Tsuneo Tomita	Sanshiro Sugata (1943)
Sanshiro Sugata (Japanese: 姿三四郎, romanized: Sugata Sanshirō) (1942), Tsuneo Tomita	Sanshiro Sugata Part II (1945)
Sanshiro Sugata (Japanese: 姿三四郎, romanized: Sugata Sanshirō) (1942), Tsuneo Tomita	Sanshiro Sugata (1955)
Sanshiro Sugata (Japanese: 姿三四郎, romanized: Sugata Sanshirō) (1942), Tsuneo Tomita	Sanshiro Sugata (1965)
Sanshiro Sugata (Japanese: 姿三四郎, romanized: Sugata Sanshirō) (1942), Tsuneo Tomita	Sanshiro Sugata (1970)
Sanshiro Sugata (Japanese: 姿三四郎, romanized: Sugata Sanshirō) (1942), Tsuneo Tomita	Sanshiro Sugata (1977)
Sanshiro Sugata (Japanese: 姿三四郎, romanized: Sugata Sanshirō) (1942), Tsuneo Tomita	Sanshiro Sugata (1981)
The Satan Bug (1962), Alistair MacLean	The Satan Bug (1965)
Save the Tiger (1972), Steve Shagan	Save the Tiger (1974)
Sayonara (1954), James A. Michener	Sayonara (1957)
A Scanner Darkly (1977), Philip K. Dick	A Scanner Darkly (2006)
Scarface (1930), Armitage Trail	Scarface (1932)
Scarface (1930), Armitage Trail	Scarface (1983)
The Scarlet Gang of Asakusa (Japanese: 浅草紅團, romanized: Asakusa Kurenaidan) (1930), Yasunari Kawabata	The Scarlet Gang of Asakusa (1930)
The Scarlet Gang of Asakusa (Japanese: 浅草紅團, romanized: Asakusa Kurenaidan) (1930), Yasunari Kawabata	The Scarlet Gang of Asakusa (1952)
The Scarlet Gang of Asakusa (Japanese: 浅草紅團, romanized: Asakusa Kurenaidan) (1930), Yasunari Kawabata	The Asakusa Story (1953)
The Scarlet Letter (1850), Nathaniel Hawthorne	The Scarlet Letter (1908)
The Scarlet Letter (1850), Nathaniel Hawthorne	The Scarlet Letter (1911)
The Scarlet Letter (1850), Nathaniel Hawthorne	The Scarlet Letter (1913)
The Scarlet Letter (1850), Nathaniel Hawthorne	The Scarlet Letter (1917)
The Scarlet Letter (1850), Nathaniel Hawthorne	The Scarlet Letter (1920)
The Scarlet Letter (1850), Nathaniel Hawthorne	The Scarlet Letter (1922)
The Scarlet Letter (1850), Nathaniel Hawthorne	The Scarlet Letter (1926)
The Scarlet Letter (1850), Nathaniel Hawthorne	The Scarlet Letter (1934)
The Scarlet Letter (1850), Nathaniel Hawthorne	The Scarlet Letter (German: Der Scharlachrote Buchstabe) (1973)
The Scarlet Letter (1850), Nathaniel Hawthorne	The Scarlet Letter (1995)
The Scarlet Pimpernel (1903–1905), Baroness Emmuska Orczy	The Scarlet Pimpernel (1917)
The Scarlet Pimpernel (1903–1905), Baroness Emmuska Orczy	The Scarlet Pimpernel (1934)
The Scarlet Pimpernel (1903–1905), Baroness Emmuska Orczy	The Return of the Scarlet Pimpernel (1937)
The Scarlet Pimpernel (1903–1905), Baroness Emmuska Orczy	"Pimpernel" Smith (1941)
The Scarlet Pimpernel (1903–1905), Baroness Emmuska Orczy	Pimpernel Svensson (1950)
The Scarlet Pimpernel (1903–1905), Baroness Emmuska Orczy	The Scarlet Pimpernel (1982)
The Scarlet Pimpernel (1903–1905), Baroness Emmuska Orczy	The Scarlet Pimpernel (1987)
The Scarlet Pimpernel (1903–1905), Baroness Emmuska Orczy	The Forecourt Pimpernel (2001)
The Searchers (1954), Alan Le May	The Searchers (1956)
Schindler's Ark (1982), Thomas Keneally	Schindler's List (1993)
The Screaming Mimi (1949), Fredric Brown	The Screaming Mimi (1958)
The Screaming Mimi (1949), Fredric Brown	The Bird with the Crystal Plumage (Italian: L'uccello dalle piume di cristallo) (1970)
The Score (1963), Donald E. Westlake (Note: Written as Richard Stark.)	Pillaged (French: Mise à sac) (1967)
The Sea Hawk (1915), Rafael Sabatini	The Sea Hawk (1924)
The Sea Hawk (1915), Rafael Sabatini	The Sea Hawk (1940)
The Sea-Wolf (1904), Jack London	The Sea Wolf (1913)
The Sea-Wolf (1904), Jack London	The Sea Wolf (1920)
The Sea-Wolf (1904), Jack London	The Sea Wolf (1926)
The Sea-Wolf (1904), Jack London	The Sea Wolf (1930)
The Sea-Wolf (1904), Jack London	The Sea Wolf (1941)
The Sea-Wolf (1904), Jack London	Wolf Larsen (1958)
The Sea-Wolf (1904), Jack London	Legend of the Sea Wolf (Italian: Il lupo dei mari) (1975)
The Sea-Wolf (1904), Jack London	The Sea Wolf (1993)
The Sea-Wolf (1904), Jack London	The Sea Wolf (1997)
The Sea-Wolf (1904), Jack London	The Sea Wolf (2008)
Season of the Sun (Japanese: 太陽の季節, romanized: Taiyō no Kisetsu) (1955), Shintaro Ishihara	Season of the Sun (1956)
The Second Victory (1958) (a.k.a. Backlash), Morris West	The Second Victory (1986)
The Secret Agent (1907), Joseph Conrad	Sabotage (1936)
The Secret Agent (1907), Joseph Conrad	The Secret Agent (1996)
The Secret Dreamworld of a Shopaholic (2003), Sophie Kinsella (Note: Sophie Kinsella is the pseudonym of Madeline Wickham.)	Confessions of a Shopaholic (2009)
The Secret Life of Bees (2002), Sue Monk Kidd	The Secret Life of Bees (2008)
Sense and Sensibility (1811), Jane Austen	Sense and Sensibility (1995)
Sense and Sensibility (1811), Jane Austen	Kandukondain Kandukondain (Tamil: கண்டுகொண்டேன் கண்டுகொண்டேன்) (2000)
Sense and Sensibility (1811), Jane Austen	From Prada to Nada (2011)
Sense and Sensibility (1811), Jane Austen	Sense and Sensibility (2024)
Sense and Sensibility (1811), Jane Austen	Sense and Sensibility (2026)
The Seven Brothers (Finnish: Seitsemän veljestä) (1870), Aleksis Kivi	Seven Brothers (1939)
The Seven Brothers (Finnish: Seitsemän veljestä) (1870), Aleksis Kivi	Seven Brothers (1979)
Seven Days to a Killing (1973), Clive Egleton	The Black Windmill (1974)
The Seven-Per-Cent Solution (1974), Nicholas Meyer	The Seven-Per-Cent Solution (1976)
The Seventh (1967), Donald E. Westlake	The Split (1968)
The Shadow-Line (1917), Joseph Conrad	The Shadow Line (Polish: Smuga cienia) (1976)
The Shadow Riders (1982), Louis L'Amour	The Shadow Riders (1982)
Shaft (1970), Ernest Tidyman	Shaft (1971)
Shaft (1970), Ernest Tidyman	Shaft's Big Score! (1972)
Shaft (1970), Ernest Tidyman	Shaft in Africa (1973)
Shaft (1970), Ernest Tidyman	Shaft (2000)
Shaft (1970), Ernest Tidyman	Shaft (2019)
Shaft's Big Score! (1972), Ernest Tidyman	Shaft's Big Score! (1972)
Shalako (1962), Louis L'Amour	Shalako (1968)
The Shape of Things to Come (1933), H. G. Wells	Things to Come (1936)
The Shape of Things to Come (1933), H. G. Wells	H. G. Wells' The Shape of Things to Come (1979)
She: A History of Adventure (serialised 1886–87, published as a book, 1887), H. Rider Haggard	She (1908)
She: A History of Adventure (serialised 1886–87, published as a book, 1887), H. Rider Haggard	She (1911)
She: A History of Adventure (serialised 1886–87, published as a book, 1887), H. Rider Haggard	She (1916)
She: A History of Adventure (serialised 1886–87, published as a book, 1887), H. Rider Haggard	She (1917)
She: A History of Adventure (serialised 1886–87, published as a book, 1887), H. Rider Haggard	She (1925)
She: A History of Adventure (serialised 1886–87, published as a book, 1887), H. Rider Haggard	She (1935)
She: A History of Adventure (serialised 1886–87, published as a book, 1887), H. Rider Haggard	She (1965)
She: A History of Adventure (serialised 1886–87, published as a book, 1887), H. Rider Haggard	The Vengeance of She (1968)
She: A History of Adventure (serialised 1886–87, published as a book, 1887), H. Rider Haggard	She (1984)
She: A History of Adventure (serialised 1886–87, published as a book, 1887), H. Rider Haggard	She (2001) (Note: Direct-to-video film.)
She Loves Me Not (1933), Edward Hope	She Loves Me Not (1934)
She Loves Me Not (1933), Edward Hope	True to the Army (1942)
She Loves Me Not (1933), Edward Hope	How to Be Very, Very Popular (1955)
She Who Was No More (French: Celle qui n'était plus) (1952), Pierre Boileau and Thomas Narcejac	Les Diaboliques (1955)
She Who Was No More (French: Celle qui n'était plus) (1952), Pierre Boileau and Thomas Narcejac	Crucible of Horror (1971)
She Who Was No More (French: Celle qui n'était plus) (1952), Pierre Boileau and Thomas Narcejac	Reflections of Murder (1974)
She Who Was No More (French: Celle qui n'était plus) (1952), Pierre Boileau and Thomas Narcejac	House of Secrets (1993)
She Who Was No More (French: Celle qui n'était plus) (1952), Pierre Boileau and Thomas Narcejac	Diabolique (1996)
Sheep (2004), Simon Maginn	The Dark (2005)
A Shilling for Candles (1936), Josephine Tey (Note: Josephine Tey is the pseudonym of Elizabeth MacKintosh.)	Young and Innocent (1937)
The Shining (1977), Stephen King	The Shining (1980)
Shining Through (1988), Susan Isaacs	Shining Through (1992)
The Shipping News (1993), Annie Proulx	The Shipping News (2001)
The Shrinking Man (1956), Richard Matheson	The Incredible Shrinking Man (1957)
The Shrinking Man (1956), Richard Matheson	The Incredible Shrinking Woman (1981)
Shoeless Joe (1982), W. P. Kinsella	Field of Dreams (1989)
The Shoes of the Fisherman (1963), Morris West	The Shoes of the Fisherman (1968)
The Shootist (1975), Glendon Swarthout	The Shootist (1976)
Shout at the Devil (1968), Wilbur Smith	Shout at the Devil (1976)
Shutter Island (2003), Dennis Lehane	Shutter Island (2010)
Sideways (2004), Rex Pickett	Sideways (2004)
The Siege of Trencher's Farm (1969), Gordon Williams	Straw Dogs (1971)
The Siege of Trencher's Farm (1969), Gordon Williams	Straw Dogs (2011)
The Silence of the Lambs (1988), Thomas Harris	The Silence of the Lambs (1991)
A Simple Plan (1993), Scott Smith	A Simple Plan (1998)
Simple Simon (1996), Ryne Douglas Pearson	Mercury Rising (1998)
The Singer Not the Song (1953), Audrey Erskine Lindop	The Singer Not the Song (1961)
Single Lady (1931), John Monk Saunders	The Last Flight (1931)
Sister Carrie (1900), Theodore Dreiser	Carrie (1952)
Six Days of the Condor (1974), James Grady	Three Days of the Condor (1975)
Six Weeks (1976), Fred Mustard Stewart	Six Weeks (1982)
The Sixth of May (Dutch: De Zesde Mei) (2003), Tomas Ross	06/05 (2003)
Skeleton Crew (1985) (Note: Short story collection; stories adapted from this work in order: The Mist (1980), "The Monkey" (also 1980) and "The Raft" (1982).), Stephen King	Creepshow 2 (1987)
Skeleton Crew (1985), Stephen King	The Mist (2007)
Skeleton Crew (1985), Stephen King	The Monkey (2025)
Skinwalkers (1986), Tony Hillerman	Skinwalkers (2002)
Skipping Christmas (2001), John Grisham	Christmas with the Kranks (2004)
Skyscraper (1931), Faith Baldwin	Skyscraper Souls (1932)
Slaughterhouse-Five (1969), Kurt Vonnegut	Slaughterhouse-Five (1972)
Slayground (1971), Donald E. Westlake	Slayground (1983)
Sleeping with the Enemy (1987), Nancy Price	Sleeping with the Enemy (1991)
Sleepless (Arabic: لا أنام, romanized: La Anam) (1969), Ihsan Abdel Quddous	Sleepless (1957)
Sliver (1991), Ira Levin	Sliver (1993)
Slugs (1982), Shaun Hutson	Slugs (1988)
Small Vices (1997), Robert B. Parker	Spenser: Small Vices (1999)
The Snatchers (1953), Lionel White	The Night of the Following Day (1968)
Snow Angels (1994), Stewart O'Nan	Snow Angels (2007)
Snow Country (Japanese: 雪国, romanized: Yukiguni) (1948), Yasunari Kawabata	Snow Country (1957)
So Red the Rose (1934), Stark Young	So Red the Rose (1935)
Solaris (1961), Stanislaw Lem	Solaris (1972)
Solaris (1961), Stanislaw Lem	Solaris (2002)
Soldier of Fortune (1953), Ernest K. Gann	Soldier of Fortune (1955)
A Soldier's Daughter Never Cries (1990), Kaylie Jones	A Soldier's Daughter Never Cries (1998)
Something Wicked This Way Comes (1962), Ray Bradbury	Something Wicked This Way Comes (1972)
Something Wicked This Way Comes (1962), Ray Bradbury	Something Wicked This Way Comes (1983)
The Song of Bernadette (1941), Franz Werfel	The Song of Bernadette (1943)
The Song of Everlasting Sorrow (Chinese: 長恨歌, romanized: Cháng hèn gē) (1995), Wang Anyi	Everlasting Regret (2005)
The Song of the Blood-Red Flower (Finnish: Laulu tulipunaisesta kukasta) (1905), Johannes Linnankoski	The Flame of Life (Swedish: Sången om den eldröda blomman) (1919)
The Song of the Blood-Red Flower (Finnish: Laulu tulipunaisesta kukasta) (1905), Johannes Linnankoski	Man's Way with Women (1934)
The Song of the Blood-Red Flower (Finnish: Laulu tulipunaisesta kukasta) (1905), Johannes Linnankoski	The Song of the Scarlet Flower (1938)
The Song of the Blood-Red Flower (Finnish: Laulu tulipunaisesta kukasta) (1905), Johannes Linnankoski	The Song of the Scarlet Flower (1956)
The Song of the Blood-Red Flower (Finnish: Laulu tulipunaisesta kukasta) (1905), Johannes Linnankoski	The Song of the Blood-Red Flower (1971)
The Song of the Damned (Portuguese: Canto dos Malditos) (2001), Austregésilo Carrano Bueno	Brainstorm (Portuguese: Bicho de Sete Cabeças) (2000)
Sons and Lovers (1913), D. H. Lawrence	Sons and Lovers (1960)
S.O.S. Noronha (1954), Pierre Viré	S.O.S. Noronha (1957)
The Sound and the Fury (1929), William Faulkner	The Sound and the Fury (1959)
The Sound of the Mountain (Japanese: 山の音, romanized: Yama no oto) (1954), Chikuma Shobō	Sound of the Mountain (1954)
The Sound of Waves (Japanese: 潮騒, romanized: Shiosai) (1954), Yukio Mishima	The Sound of Waves (1954)
The Sound of Waves (Japanese: 潮騒, romanized: Shiosai) (1954), Yukio Mishima	The Sound of Waves (1964)
The Sound of Waves (Japanese: 潮騒, romanized: Shiosai) (1954), Yukio Mishima	The Sound of Waves (1971)
The Sound of Waves (Japanese: 潮騒, romanized: Shiosai) (1954), Yukio Mishima	The Sound of Waves (1975)
The Sound of Waves (Japanese: 潮騒, romanized: Shiosai) (1954), Yukio Mishima	The Sound of Waves (1985)
Sour Sweet (1982), Timothy Mo	Soursweet (1989)
The Space Vampires (1976), Colin Wilson	Lifeforce (1985)
Spaceman of Bohemia (2017), Jaroslav Kalfař	Spaceman (2024)
The Spanish Gardener (1950), A. J. Cronin	The Spanish Gardener (1957)
Spartacus (1951), Howard Fast	Spartacus (1960)
Sphere (1987), Michael Crichton	Sphere (1998)
Spider (1990), Patrick McGarth	Spider (2002)
The Spider-Man (Japanese: 蜘蛛男, romanized: Kumo-Otoko) (1929–1930), Edogawa Ranpo	The Murderer: Spider-Man (Japanese: 殺人鬼 蜘蛛男, romanized: Satsujinki: Kumo-otoko) (1958)
The Spider-Man (Japanese: 蜘蛛男, romanized: Kumo-Otoko) (1929–1930), Edogawa Ranpo	The Spider-Man's Counterattack (Japanese: 蜘蛛男の逆襲, romanized: Kumo-otoko no gyakushū) (1958)
Spirales (1987), Christopher Frank	Spirale (1987)
Split Images (1981), Elmore Leonard	Split Images (1992)
The Spoilers (1906), Rex Beach	The Spoilers (1914)
The Spoilers (1906), Rex Beach	The Spoilers (1923)
The Spoilers (1906), Rex Beach	The Spoilers (1930)
The Spoilers (1906), Rex Beach	The Spoilers (1942)
The Spoilers (1906), Rex Beach	The Spoilers (1955)
The Spook Who Sat by the Door (1969), Sam Greenlee	The Spook Who Sat by the Door (1973)
A Sporting Proposition (1973), James Aldridge	Ride a Wild Pony (1975)
Spy Story (1974), Len Deighton	Spy Story (1976)
The Spy Who Came in from the Cold (1963), John le Carré	The Spy Who Came in from the Cold (1965)
The Spy Who Loved Me (1962), Ian Fleming	The Spy Who Loved Me (1977)
Stairs of Sand (1929), Zane Grey	Stairs of Sand (1929)
Stairs of Sand (1929), Zane Grey	Arizona Mahoney (1936)
The Stalking Moon (1965), T. V. Olsen	The Stalking Moon (1968)
Stand at Spanish Boot (1948), Harry Brown	Apache Drums (1951)
Star in the West (1959), Richard Emery Roberts	The Second Time Around (1961)
Stardust (1999), Neil Gaiman	Stardust (2007)
Starfire (1960), Robert Buckner	Moon Pilot (1962)
Stars in My Crown (1947), Joe David Brown	Stars In My Crown (1950)
The Stars Look Down (1935), A. J. Cronin	The Stars Look Down (1939)
Starship Troopers (1959), Robert A. Heinlein	Starship Troopers (1997)
Starship Troopers (1959), Robert A. Heinlein	Starship Troopers 2: Hero of the Federation (2004)
Starship Troopers (1959), Robert A. Heinlein	Starship Troopers 3: Marauder (2007)
Starship Troopers (1959), Robert A. Heinlein	Starship Troopers: Invasion (2012)
Starship Troopers (1959), Robert A. Heinlein	Starship Troopers: Traitor of Mars (2017)
Station West (1948), Luke Short	Station West (1948)
The Stepford Wives (1972), Ira Levin	The Stepford Wives (1975)
The Stepford Wives (1972), Ira Levin	Revenge of the Stepford Wives (1980)
The Stepford Wives (1972), Ira Levin	The Stepford Children (1987)
The Stepford Wives (1972), Ira Levin	The Stepford Husbands (1996)
The Stepford Wives (1972), Ira Levin	The Stepford Wives (2004)
Stella Dallas (1923), Olive Higgins Prouty	Stella Dallas (1925)
Stella Dallas (1923), Olive Higgins Prouty	Stella Dallas (1937)
Stella Dallas (1923), Olive Higgins Prouty	Stella (1990)
A Stir of Echoes (1958), Richard Matheson	Stir of Echoes (1999)
A Stir of Echoes (1958), Richard Matheson	Stir of Echoes: The Homecoming (2007)
Story of a Prostitute (Japanese: 春婦伝, romanized: Shunpuden) (1947), Taijiro Tamura	Escape at Dawn (Japanese: 暁の脱走, romanized: Akatsuki no Dassō) (1950)
Story of a Prostitute (Japanese: 春婦伝, romanized: Shunpuden) (1947), Taijiro Tamura	Story of a Prostitute (1965)
Story of O (French: Histoire d'O) (1954), Anne Desclos (Note: Written as Pauline Réage.)	Story of O (1975)
Story of O (French: Histoire d'O) (1954), Anne Desclos	Story of O: Chapter 2 (French: Histoire d'O: Chapitre 2) (1984)
Story of O (French: Histoire d'O) (1954), Anne Desclos	The Story of O: Untold Pleasures (2002)
The Story of Zarak Khan (1949), A. J. Bevan	Zarak (1956)
A Stranger Came Home (1949), George Sanders	A Stranger Came Home (1954)
A Stranger Is Watching (1977), Mary Higgins Clark	A Stranger Is Watching (1982)
Strangers (Japanese: 異人たちとの夏, romanized: Ijintachi to no natsu) (1987), Taichi Yamada	The Discarnates (1988)
Strangers (Japanese: 異人たちとの夏, romanized: Ijintachi to no natsu) (1987), Taichi Yamada	All of Us Strangers (2023)
Strangers on a Train (1950), Patricia Highsmith	Strangers on a Train (1951)
Strangers on a Train (1950), Patricia Highsmith	Once You Kiss a Stranger (1969)
Strangers on a Train (1950), Patricia Highsmith	Once You Meet a Stranger (1996)
Stranger's Return (1933), Philip Stong	The Stranger's Return (1933)
Strip Tease (1993), Carl Hiaasen	Striptease (1996)
The Stud (1969), Jackie Collins	The Stud (1978)
Sultana - La Nuit du Sérail (1982), Prince Michael of Greece and Denmark	The Favorite (a.k.a. Intimate Power) (1989)
The Sum of All Fears (1991), Tom Clancy	The Sum of All Fears (2002)
The Sun Also Rises (1926), Ernest Hemingway	The Sun Also Rises (1957)
The Sun Also Rises (1926), Ernest Hemingway	The Sun Also Rises (1984)
Sunset Pass (1928), Zane Grey	Sunset Pass (1929)
Sunset Pass (1928), Zane Grey	Sunset Pass (1933)
Sunset Pass (1928), Zane Grey	Sunset Pass (1946)
The Swarm (1974), Arthur Herzog	The Swarm (1978)
The Swiss Family Robinson (German: Der Schweizerische Robinson) (1812), Johann David Wyss	Perils of the Wild (1925) (Note: Serial film.)
The Swiss Family Robinson (German: Der Schweizerische Robinson) (1812), Johann David Wyss	Swiss Family Robinson (1940)
The Swiss Family Robinson (German: Der Schweizerische Robinson) (1812), Johann David Wyss	The Swiss Family Robinson (1958)
The Swiss Family Robinson (German: Der Schweizerische Robinson) (1812), Johann David Wyss	Swiss Family Robinson (1960)
The Swiss Family Robinson (German: Der Schweizerische Robinson) (1812), Johann David Wyss	The Swiss Family Robinson (1973)
The Swiss Family Robinson (German: Der Schweizerische Robinson) (1812), Johann David Wyss	The Swiss Family Robinson (1975)
The Swiss Family Robinson (German: Der Schweizerische Robinson) (1812), Johann David Wyss	Swiss Family Robinson (1996)
The Swiss Family Robinson (German: Der Schweizerische Robinson) (1812), Johann David Wyss	The Adventures of Swiss Family Robinson (1998)
The Swiss Family Robinson (German: Der Schweizerische Robinson) (1812), Johann David Wyss	Beverly Hills Family Robinson (1997)
The Swiss Family Robinson (German: Der Schweizerische Robinson) (1812), Johann David Wyss	The New Swiss Family Robinson (1999)
The Swiss Family Robinson (German: Der Schweizerische Robinson) (1812), Johann David Wyss	Stranded (2002)
The Sword in the Stone (1938), T. H. White	The Sword in the Stone (1963)

== T ==
Fiction work(s)	Film adaptation(s)
Taggart (1959), Louis L'Amour	Taggart (1964)
Tai-Pan (1966), James Clavell	Tai-Pan (1986)
Take Three Tenses: A Fugue in Time (1945), Rumer Godden	Enchantment (1948)
The Taking of Pelham One Two Three (1973), Morton Freedgood (Note: Written as John Godey.)	The Taking of Pelham One Two Three (1974)
The Taking of Pelham One Two Three (1973), Morton Freedgood	The Taking of Pelham One Two Three (1998)
The Taking of Pelham One Two Three (1973), Morton Freedgood	The Taking of Pelham 123 (2009)
A Tale of Two Cities (1859), Charles Dickens	A Tale of Two Cities (1917)
A Tale of Two Cities (1859), Charles Dickens	A Tale of Two Cities (1922)
A Tale of Two Cities (1859), Charles Dickens	The Only Way (1927)
A Tale of Two Cities (1859), Charles Dickens	A Tale of Two Cities (1935)
A Tale of Two Cities (1859), Charles Dickens	A Tale of Two Cities (1958)
A Tale of Two Cities (1859), Charles Dickens	A Tale of Two Cities (1980)
A Tale of Two Cities (1859), Charles Dickens	A Tale of Two Cities (1984)
Tales of the South Pacific (1947), James A. Michener	South Pacific (1958)
Tales of the South Pacific (1947), James A. Michener	South Pacific (2001)
The Talented Mr. Ripley (1955), Patricia Highsmith	Purple Noon (French: Plein soleil) (1960)
The Talented Mr. Ripley (1955), Patricia Highsmith	The Talented Mr. Ripley (1999)
The Tall Men (1954), Henry Wilson Allen	The Tall Men (1954)
Tarzan (1912–1965) (series) (Note: Plots and elements adapted from the related works: Tarzan of the Apes (1912), The Return of Tarzan (1913), The Son of Tarzan (1915), Tarzan and the Jewels of Opar (1916), Jungle Tales of Tarzan (1919) and Tarzan and the Golden Lion (1922–23) respectively.), Edgar Rice Burroughs	Tarzan of the Apes (1918)
Tarzan (1912–1965) (series), Edgar Rice Burroughs	The Romance of Tarzan (1918)
Tarzan (1912–1965) (series), Edgar Rice Burroughs	The Revenge of Tarzan (1920)
Tarzan (1912–1965) (series), Edgar Rice Burroughs	The Son of Tarzan (1920)
Tarzan (1912–1965) (series), Edgar Rice Burroughs	The Adventures of Tarzan (1921)
Tarzan (1912–1965) (series), Edgar Rice Burroughs	Tarzan and the Golden Lion (1927)
Tarzan (1912–1965) (series), Edgar Rice Burroughs	Tarzan the Mighty (1928)
Tarzan (1912–1965) (series), Edgar Rice Burroughs	Tarzan the Tiger (1929)
Tarzan (1912–1965) (series), Edgar Rice Burroughs	Tarzan the Ape Man (1932)
Tarzan (1912–1965) (series), Edgar Rice Burroughs	Tarzan the Fearless (1933)
Tarzan (1912–1965) (series), Edgar Rice Burroughs	Tarzan and His Mate (1934)
Tarzan (1912–1965) (series), Edgar Rice Burroughs	The New Adventures of Tarzan (1935)
Tarzan (1912–1965) (series), Edgar Rice Burroughs	Tarzan Escapes (1936)
Tarzan (1912–1965) (series), Edgar Rice Burroughs	Tarzan’s Revenge (1938)
Tarzan (1912–1965) (series), Edgar Rice Burroughs	Tarzan Finds a Son! (1939)
Tarzan (1912–1965) (series), Edgar Rice Burroughs	Tarzan's Secret Treasure (1941)
Tarzan (1912–1965) (series), Edgar Rice Burroughs	Tarzan's New York Adventure (1942)
Tarzan (1912–1965) (series), Edgar Rice Burroughs	Tarzan Triumphs (1943)
Tarzan (1912–1965) (series), Edgar Rice Burroughs	Tarzan's Desert Mystery (1943)
Tarzan (1912–1965) (series), Edgar Rice Burroughs	Tarzan and the Amazons (1945)
Tarzan (1912–1965) (series), Edgar Rice Burroughs	Tarzan and the Leopard Woman (1946)
Tarzan (1912–1965) (series), Edgar Rice Burroughs	Tarzan and the Huntress (1947)
Tarzan (1912–1965) (series), Edgar Rice Burroughs	Tarzan and the Mermaids (1948)
Tarzan (1912–1965) (series), Edgar Rice Burroughs	Tarzan's Magic Fountain (1949)
Tarzan (1912–1965) (series), Edgar Rice Burroughs	Tarzan and the Slave Girl (1950)
Tarzan (1912–1965) (series), Edgar Rice Burroughs	Tarzan's Peril (1951)
Tarzan (1912–1965) (series), Edgar Rice Burroughs	Tarzan's Savage Fury (1952)
Tarzan (1912–1965) (series), Edgar Rice Burroughs	Tarzan and the She-Devil (1953)
Tarzan (1912–1965) (series), Edgar Rice Burroughs	Tarzan's Hidden Jungle (1955)
Tarzan (1912–1965) (series), Edgar Rice Burroughs	Tarzan and the Lost Safari (1957)
Tarzan (1912–1965) (series), Edgar Rice Burroughs	Tarzan and the Trappers (1958)
Tarzan (1912–1965) (series), Edgar Rice Burroughs	Tarzan's Fight for Life (1958)
Tarzan (1912–1965) (series), Edgar Rice Burroughs	Tarzan's Greatest Adventure (1959)
Tarzan (1912–1965) (series), Edgar Rice Burroughs	Tarzan, the Ape Man (1959)
Tarzan (1912–1965) (series), Edgar Rice Burroughs	Tarzan the Magnificent (1960)
Tarzan (1912–1965) (series), Edgar Rice Burroughs	Tarzan Goes to India (1962)
Tarzan (1912–1965) (series), Edgar Rice Burroughs	Tarzan's Three Challenges (1963)
Tarzan (1912–1965) (series), Edgar Rice Burroughs	Tarzan and the Valley of Gold (1966)
Tarzan (1912–1965) (series), Edgar Rice Burroughs	Tarzan and the Great River (1967)
Tarzan (1912–1965) (series), Edgar Rice Burroughs	Tarzan and the Jungle Boy (1968)
Tarzan (1912–1965) (series), Edgar Rice Burroughs	Tarzan's Deadly Silence (1970)
Tarzan (1912–1965) (series), Edgar Rice Burroughs	Tarzan and the Brown Prince (1972)
Tarzan (1912–1965) (series), Edgar Rice Burroughs	Tarzan, the Ape Man (1981)
Tarzan (1912–1965) (series), Edgar Rice Burroughs	Greystoke: The Legend of Tarzan, Lord of the Apes (1984)
Tarzan (1912–1965) (series), Edgar Rice Burroughs	Adventures of Tarzan (1985)
Tarzan (1912–1965) (series), Edgar Rice Burroughs	Tarzan and the Lost City (1998)
Tarzan (1912–1965) (series), Edgar Rice Burroughs	Tarzan of the Apes (1999)
Tarzan (1912–1965) (series), Edgar Rice Burroughs	Tarzan (1999)
Tarzan (1912–1965) (series), Edgar Rice Burroughs	Tarzan Ki Beti (2002)
Tarzan (1912–1965) (series), Edgar Rice Burroughs	Tarzan & Jane (2002)
Tarzan (1912–1965) (series), Edgar Rice Burroughs	Tarzan II (2005)
Tarzan (1912–1965) (series), Edgar Rice Burroughs	Tarzan (2013)
Tarzan (1912–1965) (series), Edgar Rice Burroughs	The Legend of Tarzan (2016)
Telefon (1975), Walter Wager	Telefon (1977)
Ten Against Caesar (a. k. a. Trail's End at 'Dobe Town) (1952), Kathleen B. George and Robert A. Granger	Gun Fury (1953)
The Terminal Man (1972), Michael Crichton	The Terminal Man (1974)
Terms of Endearment (1975), Larry McMurtry	Terms of Endearment (1983)
Tess of the d'Urbervilles (1891), Thomas Hardy	Tess of the d'Urbervilles (1913)
Tess of the d'Urbervilles (1891), Thomas Hardy	Tess of the d'Urbervilles (1924)
Tess of the d'Urbervilles (1891), Thomas Hardy	Man Ki Jeet (1944)
Tess of the d'Urbervilles (1891), Thomas Hardy	Dulhan Ek Raat Ki (1967)
Tess of the d'Urbervilles (1891), Thomas Hardy	Tess (1979)
Tess of the d'Urbervilles (1891), Thomas Hardy	Trishna (2011)
The Tesseract (1998), Alex Garland	The Tesseract (2003)
Tex (1979), S. E. Hinton	Tex (1982)
Texasville (1987), Larry McMurtry	Texasville (1990)
Theatre (1937), W. Somerset Maugham	Charming Julia (German: Bezaubernde Julia) (1960)
Theatre (1937), W. Somerset Maugham	Adorable Julia (German: Julia, Du bist zauberhaft) (1962)
Theatre (1937), W. Somerset Maugham	Teatris (Russian: Театр) (1978)
Theatre (1937), W. Somerset Maugham	Poniro thilyko... katergara gynaika! (Greek: Πονηρό θηλυκό... Κατεργάρα γυναίκα!) (1980)
Theatre (1937), W. Somerset Maugham	Being Julia (2004)
There's a Porpoise Close Behind Us, Arthur Barker (1936), Noel Langley	These Foolish Things (2005)
These Foolish Things (2004), Deborah Moggach	The Best Exotic Marigold Hotel (2012)
These Foolish Things (2004), Deborah Moggach	The Second Best Exotic Marigold Hotel (2015)
They Came to Cordura (1958), Glendon Swarthout	They Came to Cordura (1959)
They Do It with Mirrors (1952), Agatha Christie	Murder Ahoy! (1964)
They Do It with Mirrors (1952), Agatha Christie	Murder with Mirrors (1985)
They Saved London (1955), Bernard Newman	Battle of the V-1 (1958)
They Shoot Horses, Don't They? (1935), Horace McCoy	They Shoot Horses, Don't They? (1969)
The Thief and the Dogs (Arabic: اللص والكلاب; al-liṣ wal-kilāb) (1961), Naguib Mahfouz	Chased by the Dogs (1962)
Thin Air (1995), Robert B. Parker	Thin Air (2000)
The Thirteenth Guest (1929), Armitage Trail	The Thirteenth Guest (1932)
The Thirteenth Guest (1929), Armitage Trail	Mystery of the 13th Guest (1943)
The Thirty-Nine Steps (1915), John Buchan	The 39 Steps (1935)
The Thirty-Nine Steps (1915), John Buchan	The 39 Steps (1959)
The Thirty-Nine Steps (1915), John Buchan	The Thirty Nine Steps (1978)
The Thirty-Nine Steps (1915), John Buchan	The 39 Steps (2008)
Thieves Like Us (1937), Frederick A. Stokes	They Live by Night (1950)
Thieves Like Us (1937), Frederick A. Stokes	Thieves Like Us (1974)
Thomasina, the Cat Who Thought She Was God (1957), Paul Gallico	The Three Lives of Thomasina (1964)
Thor (1993), Wayne Smith	Bad Moon (1996)
Three Bags Full (2005), Leonie Swann	The Sheep Detectives (2026)
The Three Godfathers (1913), Peter B. Kyne	The Three Godfathers (1916)
The Three Godfathers (1913), Peter B. Kyne	Marked Men (1919)
The Three Godfathers (1913), Peter B. Kyne	Action (1921)
The Three Godfathers (1913), Peter B. Kyne	Hell's Heroes (1930)
The Three Godfathers (1913), Peter B. Kyne	Three Godfathers (1936)
The Three Godfathers (1913), Peter B. Kyne	3 Godfathers (1948)
The Three Godfathers (1913), Peter B. Kyne	The Godchild (1974)
The Three Musketeers (French: Les Trois Mousquetaires) (1844), Alexandre Dumas, père
The Three Musketeers (French: Les Trois Mousquetaires) (1844), Alexandre Dumas, père	The Three Musketeers (1914)
The Three Musketeers (French: Les Trois Mousquetaires) (1844), Alexandre Dumas, père	The Three Musketeers (1916)
The Three Musketeers (French: Les Trois Mousquetaires) (1844), Alexandre Dumas, père	The Three Musketeers (1921; French)
The Three Musketeers (French: Les Trois Mousquetaires) (1844), Alexandre Dumas, père	The Three Musketeers (1921; American)
The Three Musketeers (French: Les Trois Mousquetaires) (1844), Alexandre Dumas, père	The Three Must-Get-Theres (1922)
The Three Musketeers (French: Les Trois Mousquetaires) (1844), Alexandre Dumas, père	The Three Musketeers (1932)
The Three Musketeers (French: Les Trois Mousquetaires) (1844), Alexandre Dumas, père	The Three Musketeers (1933)
The Three Musketeers (French: Les Trois Mousquetaires) (1844), Alexandre Dumas, père	The Three Musketeers (1935)
The Three Musketeers (French: Les Trois Mousquetaires) (1844), Alexandre Dumas, père	The Four Musketeers (Italian: I quattro moschettieri) (1936)
The Three Musketeers (French: Les Trois Mousquetaires) (1844), Alexandre Dumas, père	The Three Musketeers (1939)
The Three Musketeers (French: Les Trois Mousquetaires) (1844), Alexandre Dumas, père	The Three Musketeers (Spanish: Los tres mosqueteros) (1942)
The Three Musketeers (French: Les Trois Mousquetaires) (1844), Alexandre Dumas, père	The Three Musketeers (1946)
The Three Musketeers (French: Les Trois Mousquetaires) (1844), Alexandre Dumas, père	The Three Musketeers (1948)
The Three Musketeers (French: Les Trois Mousquetaires) (1844), Alexandre Dumas, père	The Gay Swordsman (Italian: Il figlio di d'Artagnan) (1950)
The Three Musketeers (French: Les Trois Mousquetaires) (1844), Alexandre Dumas, père	At Sword's Point (1952)
The Three Musketeers (French: Les Trois Mousquetaires) (1844), Alexandre Dumas, père	Milady and the Musketeers (Italian: Il boia di Lilla) (1952)
The Three Musketeers (French: Les Trois Mousquetaires) (1844), Alexandre Dumas, père	The Three Musketeers (1953)
The Three Musketeers (French: Les Trois Mousquetaires) (1844), Alexandre Dumas, père	Knights of the Queen (Italian: I cavalieri della regina) (1954)
The Three Musketeers (French: Les Trois Mousquetaires) (1844), Alexandre Dumas, père	Three and a Half Musketeers (Spanish: Los tres mosqueteros y medio) (1957)
The Three Musketeers (French: Les Trois Mousquetaires) (1844), Alexandre Dumas, père	The King's Musketeers (Italian: Le avventure dei tre moschettieri) (1957)
The Three Musketeers (French: Les Trois Mousquetaires) (1844), Alexandre Dumas, père	La spada imbattibile (1957)
The Three Musketeers (French: Les Trois Mousquetaires) (1844), Alexandre Dumas, père	Le imprese di una spada leggendaria (1958)
The Three Musketeers (French: Les Trois Mousquetaires) (1844), Alexandre Dumas, père	Mantelli e spade insanguinate (1959)
The Three Musketeers (French: Les Trois Mousquetaires) (1844), Alexandre Dumas, père	The Three Musketeers (1959)
The Three Musketeers (French: Les Trois Mousquetaires) (1844), Alexandre Dumas, père	The Three Musketeers (1961) (Note: Originally released in two parts: The Queen's Diamonds and The Vengeance of Milady.)
The Three Musketeers (French: Les Trois Mousquetaires) (1844), Alexandre Dumas, père	The Secret Mark of D'Artagnan (Italian: Il colpo segreto di D'Artagnan, French: Le secret de d'Artagnan) (1962)
The Three Musketeers (French: Les Trois Mousquetaires) (1844), Alexandre Dumas, père	Zorro and the Three Musketeers (Italian: Zorro e i tre moschettieri) (1963)
The Three Musketeers (French: Les Trois Mousquetaires) (1844), Alexandre Dumas, père	The Four Musketeers (1963)
The Three Musketeers (French: Les Trois Mousquetaires) (1844), Alexandre Dumas, père	Revenge of the Musketeers (Italian: D'Artagnan contro i tre moschettieri) (1963)
The Three Musketeers (French: Les Trois Mousquetaires) (1844), Alexandre Dumas, père	Cyrano and d'Artagnan (French: Cyrano et d'Artagnan) (1964)
The Three Musketeers (French: Les Trois Mousquetaires) (1844), Alexandre Dumas, père	The Three Musketeers (1969)
The Three Musketeers (French: Les Trois Mousquetaires) (1844), Alexandre Dumas, père	The Sex Adventures of the Three Musketeers (German: Die Sexabenteuer der drei Musketiere) (1971)
The Three Musketeers (French: Les Trois Mousquetaires) (1844), Alexandre Dumas, père	The Three Musketeers in Boots (ながぐつ三銃士, Nagagutsu Sanjūshi) (1972)
The Three Musketeers (French: Les Trois Mousquetaires) (1844), Alexandre Dumas, père	They Were Called Three Musketeers But They Were Four (Italian: Li chiamavano i tre moschettieri... invece erano quattro) (1973)
The Three Musketeers (French: Les Trois Mousquetaires) (1844), Alexandre Dumas, père	The Three Musketeers of the West (Italian: Tutti per uno... botte per tutti) (1973)
The Three Musketeers (French: Les Trois Mousquetaires) (1844), Alexandre Dumas, père	The Three Musketeers (1973; live-action)
The Three Musketeers (French: Les Trois Mousquetaires) (1844), Alexandre Dumas, père	The Three Musketeers (1973; animated)
The Three Musketeers (French: Les Trois Mousquetaires) (1844), Alexandre Dumas, père	The Four Charlots Musketeers (French: Les Quatre Charlots mousquetaires) (1974)
The Three Musketeers (French: Les Trois Mousquetaires) (1844), Alexandre Dumas, père	The Four Charlots Musketeers 2 (French: À nous quatre, Cardinal!) (1974)
The Three Musketeers (French: Les Trois Mousquetaires) (1844), Alexandre Dumas, père	The Three Musketeers (1974)
The Three Musketeers (French: Les Trois Mousquetaires) (1844), Alexandre Dumas, père	The Four Musketeers (1974)
The Three Musketeers (French: Les Trois Mousquetaires) (1844), Alexandre Dumas, père	d'Artagnan and Three Musketeers (1978)
The Three Musketeers (French: Les Trois Mousquetaires) (1844), Alexandre Dumas, père	The Crazy Story of the Three Musketeers (Spanish: La loca historia de los tres mosqueteros) (1983)
The Three Musketeers (French: Les Trois Mousquetaires) (1844), Alexandre Dumas, père	D'Artagnan Junior (French: Le Fou du roi) (1984)
The Three Musketeers (French: Les Trois Mousquetaires) (1844), Alexandre Dumas, père	The Three Musketeers (1986)
The Three Musketeers (French: Les Trois Mousquetaires) (1844), Alexandre Dumas, père	The Three Mouseketeers (Romanian: Uimitoarele aventuri ale muschetarilor) (1988)
The Three Musketeers (French: Les Trois Mousquetaires) (1844), Alexandre Dumas, père	The Three Musketeers Anime: Aramis' Adventure (アニメ三銃士 アラミスの冒険, Anime Sanjūshi: Aramisu no Bōken) (1989)
The Three Musketeers (French: Les Trois Mousquetaires) (1844), Alexandre Dumas, père	Kero Kero Keroppi's Three Musketeers (けろけろけろっぴの三銃士, Kero Kero Keroppi no Sanjūshi) (1991)
The Three Musketeers (French: Les Trois Mousquetaires) (1844), Alexandre Dumas, père	The Three Musketeers (1992)
The Three Musketeers (French: Les Trois Mousquetaires) (1844), Alexandre Dumas, père	The Erotic Adventures of the Three Musketeers (1992)
The Three Musketeers (French: Les Trois Mousquetaires) (1844), Alexandre Dumas, père	Ring of the Musketeers (1992)
The Three Musketeers (French: Les Trois Mousquetaires) (1844), Alexandre Dumas, père	The Three Musketeers (1993)
The Three Musketeers (French: Les Trois Mousquetaires) (1844), Alexandre Dumas, père	Revenge of the Musketeers (French: La fille de d'Artagnan) (1994)
The Three Musketeers (French: Les Trois Mousquetaires) (1844), Alexandre Dumas, père	The Musketeer (2001)
The Three Musketeers (French: Les Trois Mousquetaires) (1844), Alexandre Dumas, père	La Femme Musketeer (2004)
The Three Musketeers (French: Les Trois Mousquetaires) (1844), Alexandre Dumas, père	Mickey, Donald, Goofy: The Three Musketeers (2004)
The Three Musketeers (French: Les Trois Mousquetaires) (1844), Alexandre Dumas, père	Milady (2004)
The Three Musketeers (French: Les Trois Mousquetaires) (1844), Alexandre Dumas, père	Three Musketeers (Russian: Три мушкетёра, Tri mušketera) (2004)
The Three Musketeers (French: Les Trois Mousquetaires) (1844), Alexandre Dumas, père	The Three Musketeers (Danish: De tre musketerer) (2006)
The Three Musketeers (French: Les Trois Mousquetaires) (1844), Alexandre Dumas, père	The Three Musketeers: Saving the Crown (2007)
The Three Musketeers (French: Les Trois Mousquetaires) (1844), Alexandre Dumas, père	The Three Musketeers (2008)
The Three Musketeers (French: Les Trois Mousquetaires) (1844), Alexandre Dumas, père	Barbie and the Three Musketeers (2009)
The Three Musketeers (French: Les Trois Mousquetaires) (1844), Alexandre Dumas, père	The Three Musketeers (2011)
The Three Musketeers (French: Les Trois Mousquetaires) (1844), Alexandre Dumas, père	3 Musketeers (2011)
The Three Musketeers (French: Les Trois Mousquetaires) (1844), Alexandre Dumas, père	The Three Musketeers (2013)
The Three Musketeers (French: Les Trois Mousquetaires) (1844), Alexandre Dumas, père	The King's Musketeers (Italian: Moschettieri del re - La penultima missione) (2018)
The Three Musketeers (French: Les Trois Mousquetaires) (1844), Alexandre Dumas, père	The King's Musketeers 2 (Italian: Tutti per 1 - 1 per tutti) (2020)
The Three Musketeers (French: Les Trois Mousquetaires) (1844), Alexandre Dumas, père	Dogtanian and the Three Muskehounds (Spanish: D'Artacán y los Tres Mosqueperros) (2021)
The Three Musketeers (French: Les Trois Mousquetaires) (1844), Alexandre Dumas, père	The Three Musketeers: D'Artagnan (2023)
The Three Musketeers (French: Les Trois Mousquetaires) (1844), Alexandre Dumas, père	The Three Musketeers: Milady (2023)
The Three Worlds of Johnny Handsome (1973), Morton Freedgood	Johnny Handsome (1989)
A Thrill a Minute with Jack Albany (1967), Morton Freedgood	Never a Dull Moment (1968)
Thunder Mountain (1935), Zane Grey	Thunder Mountain (1935)
Thunder Mountain (1935), Zane Grey	Thunder Mountain (1947)
Thunderball (1961), Ian Fleming	Thunderball (1965)
Thunderball (1961), Ian Fleming	Never Say Never Again (1983)
Thunderhead (1943), Mary O'Hara	Thunderhead, Son of Flicka (1945)
The Thundering Herd (1925), Zane Grey	The Thundering Herd (1925)
The Thundering Herd (1925), Zane Grey	The Thundering Herd (1933)
The Thursday Murder Club (2020), Richard Osman	The Thursday Murder Club (2025)
A Tiger Walks (1960), Ian Niall	A Tiger Walks (1964)
Time After Time (1979), Karl Alexander	Time After Time (1979)
The Time Machine (1895), H. G. Wells	The Time Machine (1960)
The Time Machine (1895), H. G. Wells	The Time Machine (1978)
The Time Machine (1895), H. G. Wells	The Time Machine (2002)
A Time to Kill (1989), John Grisham	A Time to Kill (1996)
The Time Traveler's Wife (2003), Audrey Niffenegger	The Time Traveler's Wife (2009)
Timeline (1999), Michael Crichton	Timeline (2003)
Tinker, Tailor, Soldier, Spy (1974), John le Carré	Tinker, Tailor, Soldier, Spy (2011)
To Catch a Thief (1952), David F. Dodge	To Catch a Thief (1955)
To Have and Have Not (1937), Ernest Hemingway	To Have and Have Not (1944)
To Have and Have Not (1937), Ernest Hemingway	The Breaking Point (1950)
To Have and Have Not (1937), Ernest Hemingway	The Gun Runners (1958)
To Have and Have Not (1937), Ernest Hemingway	Captain Khorshid (Persian: ناخدا خورشید, Nakhoda Khorshid) (1987)
To Kill a Mockingbird (1960), Harper Lee	To Kill a Mockingbird (1962)
To Sir, With Love (1959), E. R. Braithwaite	To Sir, with Love (1967)
To Sir, With Love (1959), E. R. Braithwaite	To Sir, with Love II (1996)
To the Devil – a Daughter (1953), Dennis Wheatley	To the Devil a Daughter (1976)
To the Last Man (1921), Zane Grey	To the Last Man (1923)
To the Last Man (1921), Zane Grey	To the Last Man (1933)
Toby Tyler; or, Ten Weeks with a Circus (serialised 1877), published as a book 1881), James Otis Kaler (as James Otis)	Toby Tyler or 10 Weeks with a Circus (1960)
Toilers of the Sea (French: Les Travailleurs de la Mer) (1866), Victor Hugo	Toilers of the Sea (1914)
Toilers of the Sea (French: Les Travailleurs de la Mer) (1866), Victor Hugo	Toilers of the Sea (1915)
Toilers of the Sea (French: Les Travailleurs de la Mer) (1866), Victor Hugo	Toilers of the Sea (1923)
Toilers of the Sea (French: Les Travailleurs de la Mer) (1866), Victor Hugo	Toilers of the Sea (1936)
Toilers of the Sea (French: Les Travailleurs de la Mer) (1866), Victor Hugo	Sea Devils (1953)
Topaz (1967), Leon Uris	Topaz (1969)
Touch (1987), Elmore Leonard	Touch (1997)
The Tower (1973) (Note: Conflated with another work The Glass Inferno (1974) by Thomas N. Scortia and Frank M. Robinson for the film adaptation.), Richard Martin Stern	The Towering Inferno (1974)
A Town Like Alice (1950), Nevil Shute	A Town Like Alice (1956)
The Track of the Cat (1949), Walter Van Tilburg Clark	Track of the Cat (1952)
Trainspotting (1993), Irvine Welsh	Trainspotting (1996)
Trainspotting (1993), Irvine Welsh	T2 Trainspotting (2017) (Note: Film adapted from the sequel novel Porno (2002) by the same author.)
The Trap (Spanish: La trampa) (1960), María Angélica Bosco	The Unfaithful Love (Spanish: El Amor infiel) (1974)
Treasure Island (1883), Robert Louis Stevenson	Treasure Island (1918)
Treasure Island (1883), Robert Louis Stevenson	Treasure Island (1920)
Treasure Island (1883), Robert Louis Stevenson	Treasure Island (1934)
Treasure Island (1883), Robert Louis Stevenson	Treasure Island (1937)
Treasure Island (1883), Robert Louis Stevenson	Treasure Island (1950)
Treasure Island (1883), Robert Louis Stevenson	Long John Silver (1954)
Treasure Island (1883), Robert Louis Stevenson	Return to Treasure Island (1954)
Treasure Island (1883), Robert Louis Stevenson	Treasure Island (1971)
Treasure Island (1883), Robert Louis Stevenson	Animal Treasure Island (1971)
Treasure Island (1883), Robert Louis Stevenson	Treasure Island (1972; animated)
Treasure Island (1883), Robert Louis Stevenson	Treasure Island (1972; live-action)
Treasure Island (1883), Robert Louis Stevenson	Treasure Island (1982)
Treasure Island (1883), Robert Louis Stevenson	Treasure Island (French: L'Île au trésor) (1985)
Treasure Island (1883), Robert Louis Stevenson	Treasure Island (1987)
Treasure Island (1883), Robert Louis Stevenson	Treasure Island (1988)
Treasure Island (1883), Robert Louis Stevenson	Treasure Island (1990)
Treasure Island (1883), Robert Louis Stevenson	Treasure Island (1995)
Treasure Island (1883), Robert Louis Stevenson	Muppet Treasure Island (1996)
Treasure Island (1883), Robert Louis Stevenson	Treasure Island (1996)
Treasure Island (1883), Robert Louis Stevenson	Return to Treasure Island (1998) (TV)
Treasure Island (1883), Robert Louis Stevenson	Treasure Island (1999)
Treasure Island (1883), Robert Louis Stevenson	Treasure Planet (2002)
Treasure Island (1883), Robert Louis Stevenson	Pirates of Treasure Island (2006)
Treasure Island (1883), Robert Louis Stevenson	Treasure Island (German: L'Île aux trésors (2007)
Treasure Island (1883), Robert Louis Stevenson	Treasure Island (German: Die Schatzinsel) (2007)
The Treasure of the Sierra Madre (1927), B. Traven	The Treasure of the Sierra Madre (1948)
The Trial (1925), Franz Kafka	The Trial (1962)
The Trial (1925), Franz Kafka	After Hours (1985)
The Trial (1925), Franz Kafka	The Trial (1993)
Trinity's Child (1983), William Prochnau	By Dawn's Early Light (1990)
The Triumph of the Scarlet Pimpernel (1922), Baroness Orczy	The Triumph of the Scarlet Pimpernel (1928)
The Trouble with Harry (1950), Jack Trevor Story	The Trouble with Harry (1955)
True Grit (1968), Charles Portis	True Grit (1969)
True Grit (1968), Charles Portis	Rooster Cogburn (1975)
True Grit (1968), Charles Portis	True Grit: A Further Adventure (1978)
True Grit (1968), Charles Portis	True Grit (2010)
The Turning Point (German: Der Aufenthalt) (1977), Hermann Kant	The Turning Point (1983)
The Twenty-fifth Hour (Romanian: Ora 25) (1949), Constantin Virgil Gheorghiu	The 25th Hour (French: La Vingt-cinquième Heure) (1967)
Twenty Thousand Leagues Under the Seas (French: Vingt mille lieues sous les mers) (1870), Jules Verne	20,000 Leagues Under the Sea (1916)
Twenty Thousand Leagues Under the Seas (French: Vingt mille lieues sous les mers) (1870), Jules Verne	20,000 Leagues Under the Sea (1954)
Twenty Thousand Leagues Under the Seas (French: Vingt mille lieues sous les mers) (1870), Jules Verne	Captain Nemo and the Underwater City (1969)
Twenty Thousand Leagues Under the Seas (French: Vingt mille lieues sous les mers) (1870), Jules Verne	Twenty Thousand Leagues Under The Sea (1973)
Twenty Thousand Leagues Under the Seas (French: Vingt mille lieues sous les mers) (1870), Jules Verne	The Amazing Captain Nemo (1978)
Twenty Thousand Leagues Under the Seas (French: Vingt mille lieues sous les mers) (1870), Jules Verne	The Black Hole (1979)
Twenty Thousand Leagues Under the Seas (French: Vingt mille lieues sous les mers) (1870), Jules Verne	20,000 Leagues Under the Sea (1985)
Twenty Thousand Leagues Under the Seas (French: Vingt mille lieues sous les mers) (1870), Jules Verne	20,000 Leagues Under the Sea (1997)
Twenty Thousand Leagues Under the Seas (French: Vingt mille lieues sous les mers) (1870), Jules Verne	Crayola Kids Adventures: 20,000 Leagues Under the Sea (1997)
Twenty Thousand Leagues Under the Seas (French: Vingt mille lieues sous les mers) (1870), Jules Verne	20,000 Leagues Under the Sea (2002)
Twenty Thousand Leagues Under the Seas (French: Vingt mille lieues sous les mers) (1870), Jules Verne	30,000 Leagues Under the Sea (2007)
Twenty Years After (French: Vingt ans après) (1845), Alexandre Dumas, père	The Return of the Musketeers (1989)
Twilight (2005–2008) (series) (Note: Works adapted from the series in chronological order: Twilight (2005), New Moon (2006), Eclipse (2007) and Breaking Dawn (2008) respectively.), Stephenie Meyer	Twilight (2008)
Twilight (2005–2008) (series), Stephenie Meyer	The Twilight Saga: New Moon (2009)
Twilight (2005–2008) (series), Stephenie Meyer	The Twilight Saga: Eclipse (2010)
Twilight (2005–2008) (series), Stephenie Meyer	The Twilight Saga: Breaking Dawn – Part 1 (2011)
Twilight (2005–2008) (series), Stephenie Meyer	The Twilight Saga: Breaking Dawn – Part 2 (2012)
Twilight for the Gods (1958), Ernest K. Gann	Twilight for the Gods (1958)
The Twins (Dutch: De Tweeling) (2000), Tessa de Loo	Twin Sisters (2002)
Two-Gun Man (1929), Stewart Edward White	Under a Texas Moon (1929)
Two-Minute Warning (1975), George La Fountaine	Two-Minute Warning (1976)
Two Much! (1975), Donald E. Westlake	The Twin (French: Le jumeau) (1984)
Two Much! (1975), Donald E. Westlake	Two Much (1995)
The Tunnel of Love (1954), Peter De Vries	The Tunnel of Love (1958)

== U ==
Fiction work(s)	Film adaptation(s)
Ugetsu Monogatari (Japanese: 雨月物語) (1776), Ueda Akinari	Ugetsu (1953)
The Ugly Dachshund (1938), Gladys Bronwyn Stern	The Ugly Dachshund (1966)
The Unbearable Lightness of Being (Czech: Nesnesitelná lehkost bytí) (1984), Milan Kundera	The Unbearable Lightness of Being (1988)
Uncharted Seas (1938), Dennis Wheatley	The Lost Continent (1968)
Uncle Remus (1881), Joel Chandler Harris	Song of the South (1946)
Uncle Remus (1881), Joel Chandler Harris	Coonskin (1975)
Uncle Remus (1881), Joel Chandler Harris	The Adventures of Brer Rabbit (2006)
Uncommon Danger (1937), Eric Ambler	Background to Danger (1943)
Under the Tonto Rim (1926), Zane Grey	Under the Tonto Rim (1928)
Under the Tonto Rim (1926), Zane Grey	Under the Tonto Rim (1933)
Under the Tonto Rim (1926), Zane Grey	Under the Tonto Rim (1947)
Undercover Cat (1963), Gordon Gordon and Mildred Gordon	That Darn Cat! (1965)
Undercover Cat (1963), Gordon Gordon and Mildred Gordon	That Darn Cat (1997)
The Undersea Warship: A Fantastic Tale of Island Adventure (Japanese: 海島冐險奇譚 海底軍艦, romanized: Kaitō Bōken Kidan: Kaitei Gunkan) (1900), Shunrō Oshikawa	Atragon (1963)
Unforbidden Fruit (1927), Samuel Hopkins Adams	The Wild Party (1929)
The Unforgiven (1957), Alan Le May	The Unforgiven (1960)
Union Street (1982), Pat Barker	Stanley & Iris (1989)
The Unknown Soldier (Finnish: Tuntematon sotilas) (1954), Väinö Linna	The Unknown Soldier (1955)
The Unknown Soldier (Finnish: Tuntematon sotilas) (1954), Väinö Linna	The Unknown Soldier (1985)
The Unknown Soldier (Finnish: Tuntematon sotilas) (1954), Väinö Linna	The Unknown Soldier (2017)
Useless Cowboy (1943), Alan Le May	Along Came Jones (1945)

== V ==
Fiction work(s)	Film adaptation(s)
Valdez Is Coming (1970), Elmore Leonard	Valdez Is Coming (1971)
Valley of the Dolls (1966), Jacqueline Susann	Valley of the Dolls (1967)
Vampire$ (1990), John Steakley	Vampires (1998)
Vampire$ (1990), John Steakley	Vampires: Los Muertos (2002)
Vampire$ (1990), John Steakley	Vampires: The Turning (2005)
Les Valseuses (1974), Bertrand Blier	Going Places (1974)
The Vanishing American (1925), Zane Grey	The Vanishing American (1925)
The Vanishing American (1925), Zane Grey	The Vanishing American (1955)
Vanity Fair (1847–1848), William Makepeace Thackeray	Vanity Fair (1911)
Vanity Fair (1847–1848), William Makepeace Thackeray	Vanity Fair (1915)
Vanity Fair (1847–1848), William Makepeace Thackeray	Vanity Fair (1922)
Vanity Fair (1847–1848), William Makepeace Thackeray	Vanity Fair (1923)
Vanity Fair (1847–1848), William Makepeace Thackeray	Vanity Fair (1932)
Vanity Fair (1847–1848), William Makepeace Thackeray	Becky Sharp (1935)
Vanity Fair (1847–1848), William Makepeace Thackeray	Vanity Fair (2004)
Vanity Row (1953), W. R. Burnett	Accused of Murder (1956)
Vennello Adapilla (1991), Yandamuri Veerendranath	Beladingala Baale (1995)
Vengeance (1984), George Jonas	Sword of Gideon (1986)
Vengeance (1984), George Jonas	Munich (2005)
Vengeance Valley (1949), Luke Short	Vengeance Valley (1951)
Verses of Love (Indonesian: Ayat-Ayat Cinta) (2003), Habiburrahman El Shirazy	Verses of Love (2008)
Verses of Love (Indonesian: Ayat-Ayat Cinta) (2003), Habiburrahman El Shirazy	Verses of Love 2 (2017)
A Very Private Gentleman (1990), Martin Booth	The American (2010)
Vespers in Vienna (1947), Bruce Marshall	The Red Danube (1949)
The Vicomte of Bragelonne: Ten Years Later (French: Le Vicomte de Bragelonne ou Dix ans plus tard) (1847–1850), Alexandre Dumas, père	The Man in the Iron Mask (1923)
The Vicomte of Bragelonne: Ten Years Later (French: Le Vicomte de Bragelonne ou Dix ans plus tard) (1847–1850), Alexandre Dumas, père	The Iron Mask (1929)
The Vicomte of Bragelonne: Ten Years Later (French: Le Vicomte de Bragelonne ou Dix ans plus tard) (1847–1850), Alexandre Dumas, père	The Man in the Iron Mask (1939)
The Vicomte of Bragelonne: Ten Years Later (French: Le Vicomte de Bragelonne ou Dix ans plus tard) (1847–1850), Alexandre Dumas, père	The Man in the Iron Mask (Spanish: El hombre de la máscara de hierro) (1943)
The Vicomte of Bragelonne: Ten Years Later (French: Le Vicomte de Bragelonne ou Dix ans plus tard) (1847–1850), Alexandre Dumas, père	Lady in the Iron Mask (1952)
The Vicomte of Bragelonne: Ten Years Later (French: Le Vicomte de Bragelonne ou Dix ans plus tard) (1847–1850), Alexandre Dumas, père	The King's Prisoner (Italian: Il prigioniero del re) (1954)
The Vicomte of Bragelonne: Ten Years Later (French: Le Vicomte de Bragelonne ou Dix ans plus tard) (1847–1850), Alexandre Dumas, père	The Count of Bragelonne (Italian: Il Visconte di Bragelonne) (1954)
The Vicomte of Bragelonne: Ten Years Later (French: Le Vicomte de Bragelonne ou Dix ans plus tard) (1847–1850), Alexandre Dumas, père	The Iron Mask (French: Le Masque de fer) (1962)
The Vicomte of Bragelonne: Ten Years Later (French: Le Vicomte de Bragelonne ou Dix ans plus tard) (1847–1850), Alexandre Dumas, père	The Man in the Iron Mask (1977)
The Vicomte of Bragelonne: Ten Years Later (French: Le Vicomte de Bragelonne ou Dix ans plus tard) (1847–1850), Alexandre Dumas, père	The Fifth Musketeer (1979)
The Vicomte of Bragelonne: Ten Years Later (French: Le Vicomte de Bragelonne ou Dix ans plus tard) (1847–1850), Alexandre Dumas, père	The Man in the Iron Mask (1985)
The Vicomte of Bragelonne: Ten Years Later (French: Le Vicomte de Bragelonne ou Dix ans plus tard) (1847–1850), Alexandre Dumas, père	The Man in the Iron Mask (1998) (Note: Directed by Randall Wallace.)
The Vicomte of Bragelonne: Ten Years Later (French: Le Vicomte de Bragelonne ou Dix ans plus tard) (1847–1850), Alexandre Dumas, père	The Man in the Iron Mask (1998) (Note: Directed by William Richert and featuring Richert as Count Aramis.)
Victory (1915), Joseph Conrad	Victory (1919)
Victory (1915), Joseph Conrad	Dangerous Paradise (1930)
Victory (1915), Joseph Conrad	Victory (1940)
Victory (1915), Joseph Conrad	Devil's Paradise (1987)
Victory (1915), Joseph Conrad	Victory (1996)
The Viking (1951), Edison Marshall	The Vikings (1958)
Viper Three (1972), Walter Wager	Twilight's Last Gleaming (1977)
The Virginian: A Horseman of the Plains (1902), Owen Wister	The Virginian (1914)
The Virginian: A Horseman of the Plains (1902), Owen Wister	The Virginian (1923)
The Virginian: A Horseman of the Plains (1902), Owen Wister	The Virginian (1929)
The Virginian: A Horseman of the Plains (1902), Owen Wister	The Virginian (1946)
The Virginian: A Horseman of the Plains (1902), Owen Wister	The Virginian (2000)
The Virginian: A Horseman of the Plains (1902), Owen Wister	The Virginian (2014)
Vision Quest (1979), Terry Davis	Vision Quest (1985)
The Voice of Bugle Ann (1935), MacKinlay Kantor	The Voice of Bugle Ann (1936)

== W ==
Fiction work(s)	Film adaptation(s)
The Wages of Fear (French: Le Salaire de la peur) (1950), Georges-Jean Arnaud	The Wages of Fear (1953)
The Wages of Fear (French: Le Salaire de la peur) (1950), Georges-Jean Arnaud	Violent Road (1958) (a. k. a. Hell's Highway)
The Wages of Fear (French: Le Salaire de la peur) (1950), Georges-Jean Arnaud	Sorcerer (1977)
The Wages of Fear (French: Le Salaire de la peur) (1950), Georges-Jean Arnaud	The Wages of Fear (2024)
The Wailing Asteroid (1960), Murray Leinster	The Terrornauts (1967)
A Walk to Remember (1999), Nicholas Sparks	A Walk to Remember (2002)
Walkabout (a.k.a. The Children) (1959), Donald G. Payne (Note: Written as James Vance Marshall.)	Walkabout (1971)
Walking Shadow (1994), Robert B. Parker	Walking Shadow (2001)
Waltz into Darkness (1947), Cornell Woolrich (Note: Written as William Irish.)	Mississippi Mermaid (1969)
Waltz into Darkness (1947), Cornell Woolrich	Original Sin (2001)
Wanderer of the Wasteland (1923), Zane Grey	Wanderer of the Wasteland (1924)
Wanderer of the Wasteland (1923), Zane Grey	Wanderer of the Wasteland (1935)
Wanderer of the Wasteland (1923), Zane Grey	Wanderer of the Wasteland (1945)
War and Peace (1869), Leo Tolstoy	War and Peace (1956)
War and Peace (1869), Leo Tolstoy	War and Peace (1966–67)
War Horse (1982), Michael Morpurgo	War Horse (2011)
War of the Buttons (French: La Guerre des boutons) (1912), Louis Pergaud	War of the Buttons (1962)
War of the Buttons (French: La Guerre des boutons) (1912), Louis Pergaud	War of the Buttons (1994)
The War of the Roses (1981), Warren Adler	The War of the Roses (1989)
The War of the Roses (1981), Warren Adler	The Roses (2025)
The War of the Worlds (1898), H. G. Wells	The War of the Worlds (1953)
The War of the Worlds (1898), H. G. Wells	The War of the Worlds: Next Century (Polish: Wojna światów – następne stulecie) (1981)
The War of the Worlds (1898), H. G. Wells	War of the Worlds (2005)
The War of the Worlds (1898), H. G. Wells	H.G. Wells' The War of the Worlds (2005; Pendragon Pictures)
The War of the Worlds (1898), H. G. Wells	H.G. Wells' War of the Worlds (2005; The Asylum)
The War of the Worlds (1898), H. G. Wells	War of the Worlds 2: The Next Wave (2008)
The War of the Worlds (1898), H. G. Wells	War of the Worlds: The True Story (2012)
The War of the Worlds (1898), H. G. Wells	War of the Worlds: Goliath (2012)
The War of the Worlds (1898), H. G. Wells	War of the Worlds: The Attack (2023)
The War of the Worlds (1898), H. G. Wells	War of the Worlds (2025)
The Warriors (1965), Sol Yurick	The Warriors (1979)
A Watcher in the Woods (1976), Florence Engel Randall	The Watcher in the Woods (1980)
A Watcher in the Woods (1976), Florence Engel Randall	The Watcher in the Woods (2017)
Water for Elephants (2006), Sara Gruen	Water for Elephants (2011)
The Water Hole (serialised 1927–1928, published as a book 1928), Zane Grey	The Water Hole (1928)
Water Margin (Chinese: 水滸傳) (1963), Shi Nai'an (Note: Subject to academic debate.)	The Water Margin (Chinese: 水滸傳) (1972)
Water Margin (Chinese: 水滸傳) (1963), Shi Nai'an	All Men Are Brothers (Chinese: 蕩寇誌) (1975)
Water Margin (Chinese: 水滸傳) (1963), Shi Nai'an	Delightful Forest (Chinese: 快活林) (1972)
Water Margin (Chinese: 水滸傳) (1963), Shi Nai'an	Pursuit (Chinese: 林冲夜奔) (1972)
Water Margin (Chinese: 水滸傳) (1963), Shi Nai'an	Tiger Killer (Chinese: 武松) (1982)
Water Margin (Chinese: 水滸傳) (1963), Shi Nai'an	All Men Are Brothers: Blood of the Leopard (Chinese: 水滸傳之英雄本色) (1993)
Water Margin (Chinese: 水滸傳) (1963), Shi Nai'an	Troublesome Night 16 (Chinese: 水滸傳) (2002)
Watership Down (1972), Richard Adams	Watership Down (1978)
The Way West (1949), A. B. Guthrie, Jr.	The Way West (1967)
The Werewolf of Paris (1933), Guy Endore	The Curse of the Werewolf (1961)
The Werewolf of Paris (1933), Guy Endore	Legend of the Werewolf (1975)
West of the Pecos (1937), Zane Grey	West of the Pecos (1934)
West of the Pecos (1937), Zane Grey	West of the Pecos (1945)
The Wet Parade (1931), Upton Sinclair	The Wet Parade (1932)
What Do I See!? (Dutch: Wat zien ik!?) (1966) (Note: Conflated with another work Hair from Above (Dutch: Haar van Boven) (1969) by the same author for the film adaptation.), Albert Mol	Business Is Business (1971)
What Dreams May Come (1978), Richard Matheson	What Dreams May Come (1998)
Whatever (French: Extension du domaine de la lutte) (1994), Michel Houellebecq	Whatever (1999)
What's the Worst That Could Happen? (1996), Donald E. Westlake	What's the Worst That Could Happen? (2001)
The Wheel Spins (1936), Ethel Lina White	The Lady Vanishes (1938)
The Wheel Spins (1936), Ethel Lina White	The Lady Vanishes (1979)
The Wheel Spins (1936), Ethel Lina White	The Lady Vanishes (2013)
When Eight Bells Toll (1966), Alistair MacLean	When Eight Bells Toll (1971)
When Knighthood Was in Flower (1898), Charles Major	When Knighthood Was in Flower (1908) (a. k. a. When Knights Were Bold)
When Knighthood Was in Flower (1898), Charles Major	When Knighthood Was in Flower (1922)
When Knighthood Was in Flower (1898), Charles Major	The Sword and the Rose (1953)
When Worlds Collide (serialised 1932–1933, published as a book 1933), Edwin Balmer and Philip Wylie	When Worlds Collide (1951)
Where the Boys Are (1960), Glendon Swarthout	Where the Boys Are (1960)
Where the Boys Are (1960), Glendon Swarthout	Where the Boys Are '84 (1984)
Where the Red Fern Grows (1961), Wilson Rawls	Where the Red Fern Grows (1974)
Whistle Stop (1941), Maritta Wolff	Whistle Stop (1946)
White Banners (1936), Lloyd C. Douglas	White Banners (1938)
White Dog (1970), Romain Gary	White Dog (1982)
White Fang (1906), Jack London	White Fang (1925)
White Fang (1906), Jack London	White Fang (1936)
White Fang (1906), Jack London	White Fang (1946)
White Fang (1906), Jack London	White Fang (Italian: Zanna Bianca) (1973)
White Fang (1906), Jack London	The Sons of White Fang (Italian: I figli di Zanna Bianca) (1974)
White Fang (1906), Jack London	Challenge to White Fang (Italian: Il ritorno di Zanna Bianca) (1974)
White Fang (1906), Jack London	White Fang to the Rescue (Italian: Zanna Bianca alla riscossa) (1974)
White Fang (1906), Jack London	White Fang and the Gold Diggers (Italian: La spacconata) (1974)
White Fang (1906), Jack London	White Fang and the Hunter (Italian: Zanna Bianca e il cacciatore solitario) (1975)
White Fang (1906), Jack London	White Fang and the Magnificent Kid (Italian: Zanna Bianca e il grande Kid) (1977)
White Fang (1906), Jack London	White Fang (1991; Walt Disney Pictures)
White Fang (1906), Jack London	White Fang (1991; Burbank Animation Studios)
White Fang (1906), Jack London	White Fang 2: Myth of the White Wolf (1994)
White Fang (1906), Jack London	White Fang (1997)
White Fang (1906), Jack London	White Fang (French: Croc-Blanc) (2018)
White Shark (1994), Peter Benchley	Creature (1998)
The White Ship (1975), Donald G. Payne	The White Ship (1976)
The White Stallions of Vienna (1963), Alois Podhajsky	Miracle of the White Stallions (1963)
Who? (1958), Algis Budrys	Who? (1973)
Who Censored Roger Rabbit? (1981), Gary K. Wolf	Who Framed Roger Rabbit (1988)
Who Lie in Gaol (1952), Joan Henry	The Weak and the Wicked (1953)
Who Rides with Wyatt (1955), Henry Wilson Allen	Young Billy Young (1969)
Why Me? (1983), Donald E. Westlake	Why Me? (1990)
Wicked: The Life and Times of the Wicked Witch of the West (1995), Gregory Maguire	Wicked (2024)
Wicked: The Life and Times of the Wicked Witch of the West (1995), Gregory Maguire	Wicked: For Good (2025)
Wicked Water (1949), MacKinlay Kantor	Wicked Water (1953)
Wide Sargasso Sea (1966), Jean Rhys	Wide Sargasso Sea (1993)
Wide Sargasso Sea (1966), Jean Rhys	Wide Sargasso Sea (2006)
A Widow for One Year (1998), John Irving	The Door in the Floor (2004)
Wieland (1798), Charles Brockden Brown	Wieland (2024)
The Wild Heart (Spanish: Corazón salvaje) (1957), Caridad Bravo Adams	Corazón salvaje (1956)
The Wild Heart (Spanish: Corazón salvaje) (1957), Caridad Bravo Adams	Juan del Diablo (1960)
The Wild Heart (Spanish: Corazón salvaje) (1957), Caridad Bravo Adams	Corazón salvaje (1968)
Wild Horse Mesa (1928), Zane Grey	Wild Horse Mesa (1925)
Wild Horse Mesa (1928), Zane Grey	Wild Horse Mesa (1932)
Wild Horse Mesa (1928), Zane Grey	Wild Horse Mesa (1947)
Wild Justice (1979), Wilbur Smith	Wild Justice (a. k. a. Covert Assassin) (1993)
Will O' the Wisp (French: Le feu follet) (1931), Pierre Drieu La Rochelle	The Fire Within (1963)
Will O' the Wisp (French: Le feu follet) (1931), Pierre Drieu La Rochelle	Oslo, August 31st (Norwegian: Oslo, 31. august) (2011)
The Willing Flesh (1955), Willi Heinrich	Cross of Iron (1977)
Wilt (1976), Tom Sharpe	Wilt (1989)
The Wind in the Willows (1908), Kenneth Grahame	The Adventures of Ichabod and Mr. Toad (1949)
The Wind in the Willows (1908), Kenneth Grahame	The Wind in the Willows (1983)
The Wind in the Willows (1908), Kenneth Grahame	The Wind in the Willows (1987)
The Wind in the Willows (1908), Kenneth Grahame	Wind in the Willows (1988)
The Wind in the Willows (1908), Kenneth Grahame	A Tale of Two Toads (1989)
The Wind in the Willows (1908), Kenneth Grahame	The Adventures of Mole (1995)
The Wind in the Willows (1908), Kenneth Grahame	The Wind in the Willows (1995)
The Wind in the Willows (1908), Kenneth Grahame	The Adventures of Toad (1996)
The Wind in the Willows (1908), Kenneth Grahame	The Willows in Winter (1996)
The Wind in the Willows (1908), Kenneth Grahame	The Wind in the Willows (1996)
The Wind in the Willows (1908), Kenneth Grahame	The Wind in the Willows (2006)
The Wings of the Dove (1902), Henry James	The Wings of the Dove (1981)
The Wings of the Dove (1902), Henry James	The Wings of the Dove (1997)
Winnie-the-Pooh (1926–1928) (series) (Note: Plots and elements adapted from two related works: Winnie-the-Pooh (1926) and The House at Pooh Corner (1928).), A.A. Milne	The Many Adventures of Winnie the Pooh (1977)
Winnie-the-Pooh (1926–1928) (series), A.A. Milne	Pooh's Grand Adventure: The Search for Christopher Robin (1997)
Winnie-the-Pooh (1926–1928) (series), A.A. Milne	Winnie the Pooh: Seasons of Giving (1999)
Winnie-the-Pooh (1926–1928) (series), A.A. Milne	The Tigger Movie (2000)
Winnie-the-Pooh (1926–1928) (series), A.A. Milne	The Book of Pooh: Stories from the Heart (2001)
Winnie-the-Pooh (1926–1928) (series), A.A. Milne	Winnie the Pooh: A Very Merry Pooh Year (2002)
Winnie-the-Pooh (1926–1928) (series), A.A. Milne	Piglet's Big Movie (2003)
Winnie-the-Pooh (1926–1928) (series), A.A. Milne	Winnie the Pooh: Springtime with Roo (2004)
Winnie-the-Pooh (1926–1928) (series), A.A. Milne	Pooh's Heffalump Movie (2005)
Winnie-the-Pooh (1926–1928) (series), A.A. Milne	Pooh's Heffalump Halloween Movie (2005)
Winnie-the-Pooh (1926–1928) (series), A.A. Milne	Super Sleuth Christmas Movie (2007)
Winnie-the-Pooh (1926–1928) (series), A.A. Milne	Tigger and Pooh and a Musical Too (2009)
Winnie-the-Pooh (1926–1928) (series), A.A. Milne	Super Duper Super Sleuths (2010)
Winnie-the-Pooh (1926–1928) (series), A.A. Milne	Winnie the Pooh (2011)
Winnie-the-Pooh (1926–1928) (series), A.A. Milne	Christopher Robin (2018)
Winnie-the-Pooh (1926–1928) (series), A.A. Milne	Winnie-the-Pooh: Blood and Honey (2023)
Winnie-the-Pooh (1926–1928) (series), A.A. Milne	Winnie-the-Pooh: Blood and Honey 2 (2024)
Winnie-the-Pooh (1926–1928) (series), A.A. Milne	Winnie-the-Pooh: Blood and Honey 3 – The Lost Years (2027)
Winter Meeting (1946), Grace Zaring Stone (Note: Written as Ethel Vance.)	Winter Meeting (1948)
Winter's Bone (2006), Daniel Woodrell	Winter's Bone (2010)
The Winter of Our Discontent (1961), John Steinbeck	The Winter of Our Discontent (1983)
Wise Blood (1952), Flannery O'Connor	Wise Blood (1979)
The Witches (1983), Roald Dahl	The Witches (1990)
The Witches (1983), Roald Dahl	The Witches (2020)
The Witches of Eastwick (1984), John Updike	The Witches of Eastwick (1987)
Witchfinder General (1966), Ronald Bassett	Witchfinder General (1968)
Witch's Milk (1968), Peter De Vries	Pete 'n' Tillie (1972)
The Witnesses (1971), Anne Holden	The Bedroom Window (1987)
Woe to Live On (1987), Daniel Woodrell	Ride with the Devil (1999)
The Wolfen (1978), Whitley Strieber	Wolfen (1981)
The Woman and the Puppet (French: La Femme et le pantin) (1898), Pierre Louÿs	The Woman and the Puppet (1920)
The Woman and the Puppet (French: La Femme et le pantin) (1898), Pierre Louÿs	The Woman and the Puppet (1929)
The Woman and the Puppet (French: La Femme et le pantin) (1898), Pierre Louÿs	The Devil Is a Woman (1935)
The Woman and the Puppet (French: La Femme et le pantin) (1898), Pierre Louÿs	The Female (1959)
The Woman and the Puppet (French: La Femme et le pantin) (1898), Pierre Louÿs	That Obscure Object of Desire (1977)
The Woman Chaser (1960), Charles Willeford	The Woman Chaser (1999)
The Woman in Black (1983), Susan Hill	The Woman in Black (1989)
The Woman in Black (1983), Susan Hill	The Woman in Black (2012)
The Woman in Black (1983), Susan Hill	The Woman in Black: Angel of Death (2014)
The Woman in Cabin 10 (2016), Ruth Ware	The Woman in Cabin 10 (2025)
The Woman in the Dunes (砂の女, Suna no Onna) (1962), Kōbō Abe	Woman in the Dunes (1964)
The Woman in White (serialised 1859–1860, published as a book 1860), Wilkie Collins	The Woman in White (1912)
The Woman in White (serialised 1859–1860, published as a book 1860), Wilkie Collins	Tangled Lives (1917)
The Woman in White (serialised 1859–1860, published as a book 1860), Wilkie Collins	The Woman in White (1917)
The Woman in White (serialised 1859–1860, published as a book 1860), Wilkie Collins	The Woman in White (1929)
The Woman in White (serialised 1859–1860, published as a book 1860), Wilkie Collins	Crimes at the Dark House (1940)
The Woman in White (serialised 1859–1860, published as a book 1860), Wilkie Collins	The Woman in White (1948)
The Woman in White (serialised 1859–1860, published as a book 1860), Wilkie Collins	Zhenshchina v belom (1981)
Woman, Thou Art Loosed!: Healings the Wounds of the Past (1993), T. D. Jakes	Woman Thou Art Loosed (2004)
Woman, Thou Art Loosed!: Healings the Wounds of the Past (1993), T. D. Jakes	Woman Thou Art Loosed: On the 7th Day (2012)
Woman Wanted (1984), Joanna McClelland Glass	Woman Wanted (2000)
Women in Love (1920), D. H. Lawrence	Women in Love (1969)
The Women of Brewster Place (1982), Gloria Naylor	The Women of Brewster Place (1989)
Wonder Boys (1995), Michael Chabon	Wonder Boys (2000)
The Wonderful Country (1952), Thomas C. Lea, III	The Wonderful Country (1952)
The Wonderful Wizard of Oz (1900), L. Frank Baum	The Fairylogue and Radio-Plays (1908)
The Wonderful Wizard of Oz (1900), L. Frank Baum	The Patchwork Girl of Oz (1914)
The Wonderful Wizard of Oz (1900), L. Frank Baum	The Magic Cloak of Oz (1914)
The Wonderful Wizard of Oz (1900), L. Frank Baum	His Majesty, the Scarecrow of Oz (1914)
The Wonderful Wizard of Oz (1900), L. Frank Baum	The Wizard of Oz (1925)
The Wonderful Wizard of Oz (1900), L. Frank Baum	The Wizard of Oz (1939)
The Wonderful Wizard of Oz (1900), L. Frank Baum	Return to Oz (1964)
The Wonderful Wizard of Oz (1900), L. Frank Baum	Fantasía... 3 (1966)
The Wonderful Wizard of Oz (1900), L. Frank Baum	Little Ayşe and the Magic Dwarfs in the Land of Dreams (Turkish: Ayşecik ve Sihirli Cüceler Rüyalar Ülkesinde) (1971)
The Wonderful Wizard of Oz (1900), L. Frank Baum	The Wonderful Wizard of Oz (1975)
The Wonderful Wizard of Oz (1900), L. Frank Baum	Oz (1976)
The Wonderful Wizard of Oz (1900), L. Frank Baum	The Wiz (1978)
The Wonderful Wizard of Oz (1900), L. Frank Baum	The Wizard of Oz (1982)
The Wonderful Wizard of Oz (1900), L. Frank Baum	Lion of Oz (2000)
The Wonderful Wizard of Oz (1900), L. Frank Baum	The Muppets' Wizard of Oz (2005)
The Wonderful Wizard of Oz (1900), L. Frank Baum	After the Wizard (2011)
The Wonderful Wizard of Oz (1900), L. Frank Baum	Tom and Jerry and the Wizard of Oz (2011)
The Wonderful Wizard of Oz (1900), L. Frank Baum	Dorothy and the Witches of Oz (2012)
The Wonderful Wizard of Oz (1900), L. Frank Baum	Oz the Great and Powerful (2013)
The Wonderful Wizard of Oz (1900), L. Frank Baum	Legends of Oz: Dorothy's Return (2013)
The Wonderful Wizard of Oz (1900), L. Frank Baum	Guardians of Oz (2015)
The Wonderful Wizard of Oz (1900), L. Frank Baum	Tom and Jerry: Back to Oz (2016)
The Wonderful Wizard of Oz (1900), L. Frank Baum	The Steam Engines of Oz (2018)
The World According to Garp (1978), John Irving	The World According to Garp (1982)
The World in His Arms (1946), Rex Beach	The World in His Arms (1952)
The World of Henry Orient (1956), Nora Johnson	The World of Henry Orient (1964)
The Wreck of the Mary Deare (1956), Hammond Innes	The Wreck of the Mary Deare (1959)
A Wrinkle in Time (1962), Madeleine L'Engle	A Wrinkle in Time (2003)
A Wrinkle in Time (1962), Madeleine L'Engle	A Wrinkle in Time (2018)
The Wrong Box (1889), Robert Louis Stevenson and Lloyd Osbourne	The Wrong Box (1966)
Wuthering Heights (1847), Emily Brontë	Wuthering Heights (1939)
Wuthering Heights (1847), Emily Brontë	Abismos de Pasión (1954)
Wuthering Heights (1847), Emily Brontë	Dil Diya Dard Liya (1966)
Wuthering Heights (1847), Emily Brontë	Wuthering Heights (1970)
Wuthering Heights (1847), Emily Brontë	Emily Brontë's Wuthering Heights (1992)
Wuthering Heights (1847), Emily Brontë	Wuthering Heights (2003)
Wuthering Heights (1847), Emily Brontë	Wuthering Heights (2011)
Wuthering Heights (1847), Emily Brontë	Wuthering Heights (2026)

== Y ==
Fiction work(s)	Film adaptation(s)
The Year of Living Dangerously (1978), Christopher Koch	The Year of Living Dangerously (1982)
The Year of the Angry Rabbit (1964), Russell Braddon	Night of the Lepus (1972)
The Year of the Horse (1965), Eric S. Hatch	The Horse in the Gray Flannel Suit (1968)
The Year of the Jellyfish (French: L'Année des méduses) (1983), Christopher Frank	Year of the Jellyfish (1984)
Yellowstone Kelly (1958), Henry Wilson Allen	Yellowstone Kelly (1959)
Yield to the Night (1954), Joan Henry	Yield to the Night (1956)
Yo, Puta (2003), Isabel Pisano	Whore (2004)
You Only Live Twice (1964), Ian Fleming	You Only Live Twice (1967)
You're Best Alone (1943), Norah Lofts	Guilt Is My Shadow (1950)
Your Ticket Is No Longer Valid (1977), Romain Gary	Your Ticket Is No Longer Valid (1981)
Young Adam (1957), Alexander Trocchi	Young Adam (2003)
Young Man of Manhattan (1930), Katharine Brush	Young Man of Manhattan (1930)
Young Man with a Horn (1938), Dorothy Baker	Young Man with a Horn (1950)

== Z ==
Fiction work(s)	Film adaptation(s)
Zazie in the Metro (French: Zazie dans le métro) (1959), Raymond Queneau	Zazie in the Metro (1960)
Zero Focus (雪国, Zero no Shōten) (1959), Seichō Matsumoto	Zero Focus (1961)
Zift (Bulgarian: Дзифт, Dzift) (2006), Vladislav Todorov	Zift (2008)
Zona Zamfirova (1906), Stefan Sremac	Zona Zamfirova (2002)
Zorba the Greek (1946), Nikos Kazantzakis	Zorba the Greek (1964)

== See also ==
- Lists of works of fiction made into feature films
  - List of fiction works made into feature films (0–9, A–C)
  - List of fiction works made into feature films (D–J)
  - List of fiction works made into feature films (K–R)
- Lists of literature made into feature films
  - List of short fiction made into feature films
  - List of children's books made into feature films
  - List of non-fiction works made into feature films
  - List of comics and comic strips made into feature films
  - List of plays adapted into feature films (disambiguation)
