= 10th British Academy Film Awards =

1957 film awards ceremony

- Date: 1957

Highlights
- Best Film: Gervaise
- Best British Film: Reach for the Sky
- Most awards: Gervaise, & A Town Like Alice (2)
- Most nominations: Reach for the Sky, & A Town Like Alice (5)

The 10th British Academy Film Awards, given by the British Academy of Film and Television Arts in 1957, honoured the best films of 1956.

== Winners and nominees ==
=== Best Film ===
Gervaise

- Amici per la pelle
- Baby Doll
- The Battle of the River Plate
- Shadow
- The Unfrocked One
- Guys and Dolls
- The Killing
- The Man Who Never Was
- The Man with the Golden Arm
- Picnic
- Poprygunya
- Reach for the Sky
- Rebel Without a Cause
- Smiles of a Summer Night
- A Town Like Alice
- The Trouble with Harry
- War and Peace
- Yield to the Night

=== Best British Film ===
Reach for the Sky

- The Man Who Never Was
- The Battle of the River Plate
- A Town Like Alice
- Yield to the Night

=== Best Foreign Actor ===
Francois Perier in Gervaise

- Karl Malden in Baby Doll
- Pierre Fresnay in The Unfrocked One
- Frank Sinatra in The Man with the Golden Arm
- Spencer Tracy in The Mountain
- William Holden in Picnic
- James Dean in Rebel Without a Cause
- Gunnar Bjornstrand in Smiles of a Summer Night

=== Best British Actor ===
Peter Finch in A Town Like Alice

- Jack Hawkins in The Long Arm
- Kenneth More in Reach for the Sky

=== Best British Actress ===
Virginia McKenna in A Town Like Alice

- Dorothy Alison in Reach for the Sky
- Audrey Hepburn in War and Peace

=== Best Foreign Actress ===
Anna Magnani in The Rose Tattoo

- Carroll Baker in Baby Doll
- Ava Gardner in Bhowani Junction
- Maria Schell in Gervaise
- Jean Simmons in Guys and Dolls
- Susan Hayward in I'll Cry Tomorrow
- Kim Novak in Picnic
- Marisa Pavan in The Rose Tattoo
- Eva Dahlbeck in Smiles of a Summer Night
- Shirley MacLaine in The Trouble with Harry

=== Best British Screenplay ===
The Man Who Never Was - Nigel Balchin

- The Battle of the River Plate - Michael Powell and Emeric Pressburger
- The Green Man - Sidney Gilliat and Frank Launder
- Private's Progress - Frank Harvey and John Boulting
- Reach for the Sky - Lewis Gilbert
- Smiley - Moore Raymond and Anthony Kimmins
- Three Men in a Boat - Hubert Gregg and Vernon Harris
- A Town Like Alice - W.P. Lipscomb and Richard Mason
- Yield to the Night - John Cresswell and Joan Henry

=== Best Animated Film ===
Gerald McBoing! Boing! on Planet Moo

- Calling All Salesmen
- Christopher Crumpet's Playmate
- History of the Cinema
- The Invisible Moustache of Raoul Dufy
- Love and the Zeppelin
- Rythmetic

=== Best Documentary ===
On the Bowery

- Foothold in Antarctica
- Generator 4
- The Silent World (Le Monde Du Silence)
- Under the Same Sky

=== Most Promising Newcomer to Film ===
Eli Wallach - Baby Doll

- Stephen Boyd - The Man Who Never Was
- Don Murray - Bus Stop
- Susan Strasberg - Picnic
- Elizabeth Wilson - Patterns of Power

=== United Nations Award ===
Race for Life

- To Your Health
- The Great Locomotive Chase
- Pacific Destiny
- Under the Same Sky

=== Special Award ===
The Red Balloon

- On the Twelfth Day
- Underwater Symphony
- The Door in the Wall
- Man in Space
