= The Weak and the Wicked =

1954 film by J. Lee Thompson

- UK release poster
- Directed by: J. Lee Thompson
- Written by: Anne Burnaby; J. Lee Thompson; Joan Henry
- Based on: Who Lie in Gaol by Joan Henry
- Produced by: Victor Skutezky
- Starring: Glynis Johns; Diana Dors; John Gregson
- Cinematography: Gilbert Taylor
- Edited by: Richard Best
- Music by: Leighton Lucas
- Production companies: Associated British; Marble Arch Productions
- Distributed by: Associated British-Pathé
- Release date: 4 February 1954
- Running time: 88 minutes
- Country: United Kingdom
- Language: English
- Box office: £213,706 (UK)

The Weak and the Wicked (U.S. title: Young and Willing) is a 1954 British drama film directed by J. Lee Thompson and starring Glynis Johns and Diana Dors. It was written by Anne Burnaby, Thompson and Joan Henry, based on the 1952 autobiographical novel Who Lie in Gaol by Henry.

== Plot ==
Jean Raymond, a young woman from a wealthy family, becomes addicted to gambling despite objections from her boyfriend Michael Hale, a medical student. After Michael qualifies as a doctor, he gives Jean an ultimatum to stop gambling or lose him. Jean continues gambling, and Michael ends their relationship.

Jean accumulates debts at an illegal gambling club operated by Seymour. When she refuses to leave her father's cigarette case as collateral, Seymour threatens "alternative collection methods". Without income or employment, Jean accepts work at a Knightsbridge dress shop offered by her friend Pam.

Pam secretly works for Seymour. During dinner, Pam steals Jean's cigarette case while Jean takes a phone call. Pam pawns the case and plants the pawn ticket in Jean's flat. When Jean files an insurance claim for the "lost" case, she is arrested and convicted of fraud, receiving a twelve-month prison sentence.

At Blackdown Prison, Jean meets various inmates: Betty Brown, imprisoned for protecting her boyfriend Norman from criminal charges; Nellie Baden, a repeat shoplifter from a criminal family; Babs Peters, whose child died due to neglect; and Pat Anderson, who is pregnant.

Michael visits Jean in prison but accepts a three-year medical position in Northern Rhodesia. Jean encourages his departure, believing her criminal record makes her unsuitable as a partner. Michael leaves for Africa, and Jean serves her remaining sentence.

Jean transfers to "the Grange," an experimental open prison without bars or locks, designed to promote rehabilitation through trust. She reunites with Betty Brown, who is distraught over Norman's abandonment. During a supervised outing, Betty attempts to escape to find Norman but returns voluntarily. Both women receive disciplinary action for the incident, which marks the first escape attempt in the prison's history.

Following Jean's release, Michael returns from Africa after resigning his position, and the couple reunite.

== Cast ==
- Glynis Johns as Jean Raymond
- Diana Dors as Betty Brown
- John Gregson as Dr. Michael Hale
- Olive Sloane as Nellie Baden, inmate
- Rachel Roberts as Pat, pregnant inmate
- Jane Hylton as Babs Peters, inmate
- Athene Seyler as Millie Williams, inmate
- Jean Taylor Smith as prison governor (Grange)
- Cecil Trouncer as presiding judge
- Ursula Howells as Pam Vickers
- Edwin Styles as Seymour
- Sid James as Syd Baden
- Eliot Makeham as Grandad Baden
- Joan Haythorne as prison governor (Blackdown)
- Joyce Heron as prison matron Arnold
- Anthony Nicholls as prison chaplain
- Josephine Stuart as Andy, pregnant inmate
- Paul Carpenter as Joe, Bab's boyfriend
- Sybil Thorndike as Mabel Wicks, Millie's friend
- A. E. Matthews as Harry Wicks, Mabel's beau
- Barbara Couper as prison doctor
- Mary Merrall as Mrs. Skinner
- Marjorie Rhodes as Suzie, bigamist inmate
- Josephine Griffin as Miriam
- Simone Silva as Tina
- Thea Gregory as Nancy
- Tom Gill as shop assistant
- Herbert C. Walton as Blue Eyes, the gardener
- Irene Handl as waitress
- Sandra Dorne as Stella
- Bessie Love as prisoner
- Marjorie Stewart as prisoner
- Marianne Stone as prisoner
- Hannah Watt as prison matron
- Margaret Diamond as prison matron
- Maureen Pryor as prison matron
- Ruth Dunning as prison matron
- Kathleen Michael as prison matron
- Jean Anderson as policewoman in court
- Ballard Berkeley as police detective
- Anthony Newley as Bob

== Production ==
=== Development ===
Joan Henry was a writer who had connections in society. She had a gambling problem, and was sentenced to twelve months in prison for passing a fraudulent cheque (she claimed she was framed). Henry served eight months at Holloway and the more liberal Askham Grange open prison. At the latter she came under the care of Mary Size. Henry wrote the 1952 best-selling book Who Lie in Gaol about her experience.

The book was read by writer-director J. Lee Thompson, who wanted to turn it into a film. He received backing from Robert Clark, head of production at Associated British. Thompson wound up falling in love with Henry and leaving his wife and two children to marry her.

The British Home Office refused co-operation with the making the film because they were unhappy with its depiction of prison.

Diana Dors was cast only a few weeks after having been convicted in real life of stealing alcohol from a friend's house. The role marked a significant change of pace for Dors, who was better known for comedic roles. Simone Silva was another member of the cast better known for glamour roles.

=== Shooting ===
The film was shot at Elstree Studios and on location in Aylesbury, Buckinghamshire, filming starting on 10 August 1953 under the title Women Behind Bars. Mary Size and Joan Henry were on set as advisers.

Henry thought Johns was a good actor but "a bit goody-goody".

== Reception ==
=== Critical ===
The Monthly Film Bulletin said "The treatment of this story provides an unfortunate example of the malaise with which so much British script-writing is afflicted nowadays. The basic situation is promising" but "against these back-grounds are paraded a prize collection of familiar feminine character types (alternately comic, sad and hysterical) – two-dimensional creatures, observed without insight or real compassion."

The New York Times called it "a lukewarm drama".

Variety called it "a safe formula for a box office meller." (Note: "Meller" is professional slang for melodrama.)

In The Radio Times Guide to Films Sue Heal gave the film 3/5 stars, writing: "This is one of those riveting women's prison pictures full of sneering warders and snarling, sulky inmates that alternates alarmingly between enlightening social comment and overloaded melodrama. A robust cast that contains all the usual suspects (there's a fine performance from Diana Dors) acts out the story, which provides a meaty glimpse behind the clanging doors."

In British Sound Films: The Studio Years 1928–1959 David Quinlan rated the film as "average", writing: "Familiar types in rose-coloured view of prison life."

Leslie Halliwell wrote "Predictable portmanteau drama with stalwart performances."

According to Steven Vagg in Filmink, the film changed perceptions of Diana Dors.

=== Box office ===
According to Kinematograph Weekly the film was a "money maker" at the British box office in 1954. The National Film Finance Corporation stated the film made a comfortable profit.

It was estimated to earn between $75,000 and $100,000 for Associated British in the U.S.

== Legacy ==
Joan Henry later wrote the 1954 novel Yield to the Night, which Thompson filmed with Dors in 1956. Henry and Thompson were later married.
