= The Dark (2005 film) =

- Theatrical poster
- Directed by: John Fawcett
- Screenplay by: Stephen Massicotte
- Based on: Sheep by Simon Maginn
- Produced by: Paul W. S. Anderson; Jeremy Bolt; Steve Christian; Robert Kulzer
- Starring: Sean Bean; Maria Bello; Richard Elfyn; Maurice Roëves; Abigail Stone; Sophie Stuckey; Caspar Harvey
- Cinematography: Christian Sebaldt
- Edited by: Chris Gill
- Music by: Edmund Butt
- Production companies: Constantin Film; Impact Pictures
- Distributed by: Constantin Film (Germany); Momentum Pictures (United Kingdom)
- Release date: May 2005
- Running time: 93 minutes
- Countries: Germany; United Kingdom
- Languages: English; Welsh

The Dark is a 2005 folk horror film directed by John Fawcett and starring Sean Bean and Maria Bello. It is based on the 1994 novel Sheep by Simon Maginn. The film was shot on the Isle of Man.

== Plot ==
While in Wales visiting her husband James, Adèlle tries to fix her relationship with her daughter Sarah. By the side of a cliff, they see a strange memorial with evidence of a plate missing and with the name "Annwyn" marked on it. A local man Dafydd explains that, according to traditional Welsh mythology, Annwyn is a sort of afterlife.

Later, Sarah vanishes on the beach, and another similar looking girl, named Ebrill (Welsh for "April"), appears in her place. Ebrill is the long-dead daughter of a local shepherd who also served as the town's pastor fifty years prior. When Ebrill, who was a sickly child, died, her father gave her to the ocean, sending her to Annwyn. He then convinced his followers to throw themselves into the ocean, claiming that it was the way to Paradise, while he privately hoped that their sacrifice would return Ebrill to him from Annwyn. Ebrill did come back, but, something came back with her. Her father tried to draw the evil out of her, through trepanning and locking her in her room. Dafydd was one of the followers who did not throw himself off the cliff, though both his parents did. Ebrill's father took him in, and when Dafydd could no longer bear witnessing the shepherd hurting Ebrill, he set her free, which in turn allowed the evil within her to lash out and shove her father over the cliff.

Adèlle makes the connection that Ebrill is back once more because she has found a living substitute in Sarah. In an attempt to rescue her daughter, Adèlle throws both herself and Ebrill over the cliffs, despite James' protests, and sends them both to Annwyn, a sepia-toned, misty version of reality. While in Annwyn, the film reveals that (prior to the events of the film) Sarah attempted suicide following an argument with her mother, resulting in their trip to Wales. Adèlle begs for a second chance with her daughter. Ebrill informs her that the dead don't get second chances. Ebrill and her father perform trepanation on Adèlle, to draw out the evil within her. Adèlle eventually escapes her bonds and rushes to find Sarah, who is locked behind a door. Adèlle finds a key and tearfully apologises for being so selfish. In unlocking the door, Adèlle is able to rescue Sarah from Annwyn, though, in doing so, Adèlle sacrificed herself, only to realise too late that the Sarah she brought back was tainted by the same evil that had tainted Ebrill all those years ago.

== Cast ==
- Sean Bean as James
- Maria Bello as Adèlle
- Richard Elfyn as Rowan
- Maurice Roëves as Dafydd
  - Caspar Harvey as young Dafydd
- Abigail Stone as Ebrill
- Sophie Stuckey as Sarah

== Music ==
The soundtrack features a song by Stream of Passion sung by Marcela Bovio.

== Release ==
=== Home media ===
A region 1 DVD was released on 11 April 2006 by Sony Pictures Home Entertainment.

== Reception ==
=== Critical response ===
The Dark has an approval rating of 40% on review aggregator website Rotten Tomatoes, based on 10 reviews, and an average rating of 4.4/10.
