= Look on Tempests =

1960 British play

Look On Tempests was a 1960 play by Joan Henry. It staged at the Comedy Theatre in London's West End. It showed the effect on the upper middle class family of a man accused of gross indecency, and became the first play dealing with homosexuality to be approved for performance by the Lord Chamberlain, who had lifted a ban on the subject the previous year.

The cast of the original production included Vanessa Redgrave and Gladys Cooper. It was not a success with audiences. It ran for 30 performances.
