= Mary Size =

Anglo-Irish penal reformer and prison officer (c.1882–1959)

Mary A. Size OBE
- Born: 1882/1883; KIlshanvy, Kilconly, near Tuam, County Galway, Ireland
- Died: 1959 (aged 76); Leicester, England
- Occupations: Teacher, prison warder, probation officer, reformer

Mary A. Size, OBE (c. 1882–1959) was an Irish penal reformer and officer in the English prison system in the early to mid-twentieth century, considered one of "the great reformers" of the prison system for women in England at this time.

== Early life ==
Mary Size was born in 1882 or 1883 in the townland of Kilshanvy, Kilconly, near Tuam, County Galway and attended the local Tubberoe National School. She began her career as an English teacher at a local school in County Galway in the early 1900s, before immigrating to England. She became interested in how to help and support the more difficult students, which influenced her future career.

Size would return to Galway during the holidays and test the children on what they had learned. After Size became Deputy Governor of Holloway Prison in 1927, she gave the children from her former school clothes made by the Holloway prisoners.

== Early career in the English prison service ==
After moving to England in 1906 at the age of 23, Size became a prison warder and initially spent two months of probation work as an officer in Manchester Prison. She later wrote in her memoir Prisons I Have Known (1957), of her surprise and concern that the women there were not given a cup of tea with their meagre breakfast. "My sympathy went out to the women. I wondered how they could exist without a cup of tea”.

She then moved to Aylesbury Prison to receive hospital work training "from the only fully-trained nurse in the [prison] service. In 1912, Size was appointed school mistress to the Borstal school at Aylesbury Prison, where she had initial difficulties in establishing a system to adequately contain and care for these troubled girls, who numbered about fifty, at the school - in part due to her pupil's different social backgrounds, their physical and mental condition, and their previous education. While living in Aylesbury, Size was an active member of the local Roman Catholic community.

Size later worked at Leeds Prison. Accommodation for female officers working in the English prison system in the early twentieth century was often an afterthought and this was no less true for Size's early work: her first room at Manchester Prison adjoined a prisoner's cell and after outside accommodation in Leeds ended, Size was found some space in a store cell at Leeds Prison. More generally, most prison staff accommodation (especially in female wings), were converted cells at the ends of corridors or landings, or rooms in the hospital.

== Liverpool, Holloway and Aylesbury Prisons, 1925-1942 ==
Size eventually worked her way up to become the Lady Superintendent at Liverpool Prison in 1925, where she "took with her an ethos developed in the reformatory borstal system." Size was also working in the a changing context for the imprisonment of women in the English penal system: when she first joined in the early 1900s, a large number of women were imprisoned for short sentences. By the 1920s, the introduction of fines in lieu of short prison sentences in combination with the introduction of old age pensions led to a significant decrease in the female prison population, in particular those serving short sentences.

Around May 1927, Size was appointed Deputy Governor at Holloway Prison (which had become a women's only prison in 1902) and was the first woman to hold the post and the only woman in the UK to hold an equivalent role. By 1934, Holloway was the largest women's prison in the UK, holding 370 women prisoners out of a total population of about 800 women prisoners across all UK prisons.

While Deputy Governor at Holloway, Size introduced a whole range of important reforms including considerable improvements in routine and in methods of classification at the prison. She also persuaded Gracie Fields to perform at the prison for the prisoners.

Size's appointment was part of a wider programme of penal reform and she was appointed with a brief to make Holloway "the best women’s prison in the country."

This reform programme of women's prisons in England in the late 1920s and into the 1930s brought about educational improvements and a new stress on the importance of femininity with mirrors being allowed in cells, more feminine wall colours, and allowing female inmates to purchase cosmetics and make-up. Previously, some female prisoners at Holloway had used cooking-flour or distemper scraped from a wall as face powder and red dye from prison library books for rouge.

Other reforms put in place by Size included the converting an exercise yard at Holloway into a rose garden, where female prisoners could be trained in gardening - a skill which could be put to use in domestic service after their release from prison.

More generally, Size developed handicrafts, modernised uniforms, established a canteen, introduced gardening and evening classes.

Size served as Deputy Governor at Holloway Prison until 1941; both staff and prisoners were evacuated to Aylesbury Prison at the outbreak of the Second World War.

Between 1941 and 1942, Size was Governor of Aylesbury Prison, where Size arranged for prisoners to knit comforts for men and women which were sent to the Red Cross Depot at Oxford for distribution.

In June 1941, Size was appointed a member of the Order of the British Empire (OBE) in the King's Birthday Honours List in recognition of her work on prison reform. In 1942, Size retired from the prison service "for health reasons" after thirty-six years' service.

== Askham Grange open prison, 1946-1952 ==
In 1946, Size came out of retirement and rejoined the prison service to become the first Governor of the new Askham Grange Open Prison, opened in January 1947. Askham Grange was the first women's open prison, a new, controversial, and experimental type of prison - "a prison-without-bars." In 1950, Size noted that of the 220 women discharged from Askham Grange prison, only six had been re-convicted and added that she was even prouder still that a female prisoner had said to her "How wonderful it is to be treated as a human being again."

In 1951, English writer Joan Henry was imprisoned at Holloway and Askram Grange, the latter under Size, whom Henry later described in her 1952 book Who Lie in Gaol as "a mixture of discipline and humanity." Historian and academic Dr Ann D. Smith described Smith as "a sincerely religious woman [and] dedicated to her work ... Miss Size's understanding of the needs, problems and frailties of the prisoners under her care enabled her to initiate countless small reforms of routine and treatment during her periods of office at Liverpool and Holloway and, eventually, as Governor of Askham Grange.

In 1952, Size retired from the prison service for a second and final time. Around the time of her second retirement, one of her former 'girls' (female prisoners) referred to Size as "the Elizabeth Fry of this generation."

== Later life ==
In 1957, Size published her memoirs on her career and long service in aid of penal reform Prisons I have known.

Throughout her time in the English prison service, Size stressed the need for a more sympathetic and humane approach to prisoner reform and that to humiliate or degrade the prisoner was to crush any self-respect or morality they may have originally possessed. Instead, she believed in humanising, supporting, and educating prisoners during their time in the penal system.

Size's death at age 76 was announced in early February 1959.
