= Widow (1976 film) =

Widow is a 1976 American TV film directed by J. Lee Thompson from a script by Barbara Turner. It was based on a memoir by publicist Lynne Caine.

== Premise ==
A woman is widowed when her husband dies of cancer, meaning she has to look after their two children.

== Cast ==
- Michael Learned
- Farley Granger
- Bradford Dillman
- Carol Rossen
- Michelle Stacy
- Amzie Strickland
- Eric Olson
- Louise Sorel
- Kate Woodville
- Carmen Mathews
- Robert Lansing

== Production ==
The film was made by Lorimar who also made The Waltons. Star of that show, Michael Learned, was the star of Widow. Learned called it "the best script I've seen for TV or movies since I came to Hollywood." It was shot at Burbank Studios in May 1975.

== Reception ==
The Los Angeles Times called it "resourcefully made" with "an admirably tough minded and comprehensive script."
