= Simon Maginn =

British writer (born 1961)

- Born: 1961 (age 64–65); Wallasey, Merseyside, England
- Occupation: Writer
- Writing career
- Pen name: Simon Nolan

Simon Maginn (born 1961 in is a British horror/thriller writer. He is best known for the 1994 novel Sheep, which was released as a film under the title The Dark in 2005.

== Early life ==
Maginn was born in Wallasey, Merseyside) in 1961. He cites among his early influences films like Psycho, The Amityville Horror and The Shining, as well as novels like Mervyn Peake's Gormenghast and The Exorcist by William Peter Blatty. He studied music at the University of Sussex, specialising in percussion and composition.

== Career ==
Maginn published his first novel, Sheep, in 1994, which won WHSmith Fresh Talent Award. He is also the author of: Virgins and Martyrs (Corgi, 1995), A Sickness of the Soul (Corgi 1995), Methods of Confinement (Black Swan 1996) and the novella Rattus (Pendragon Press 2010). The last of these was published alongside a novella by Gary Fry, in a compilation entitled Feral Companions.

Maginn has also published satirical comedies under the pseudonym Simon Nolan: As Good as it Gets (Quartet Books, 1998), The Vending Machine of Justice (Quartet Books, 2000) and Whitehawk (Revenge Ink, 2010).

In 1993, Maginn was one of six authors chosen by W. H. Smith for a campaign involving a purchase of 20,000 paperback books. At the time, Maginn was a music teacher.

He is politically active, both on and off social media. In 2018, Maginn spoke out on what he called: 'the fabrication of an “antisemitism crisis” in the Labour Party and the smearing of its socialist leader'. As a result he was involved in an online clash with J. K. Rowling over his tweets on this subject.

== Personal life ==
Maginn has spent much of his life suffering from DSPS (Delayed Sleep Phase Disorder), a chronic sleep issue, which meant that he was unable to keep a conventional job, "except for short bursts" during his twenties. This problem, he says, has since been resolved.

== Bibliography ==
Maginn, Simon (1994). Sheep. UK: Corgi. ISBN 9780552141222.

Maginn, Simon (1995). Virgins and Martyrs. UK: Corgi. ISBN 9780552142496.

Maginn, Simon (1996). A Sickness of the Soul. UK: Corgi. ISBN 9780552142502.

Maginn, Simon (1996). Methods of Confinement. UK: Black Swan. ISBN 9780552997089.

Maginn, Simon (2010). Feral Companions. UK: Pendragon. ISBN 978-1906864040.

As Simon Nolan:

Nolan, Simon (1998). As Good as it Gets. UK: Quartet Books. ISBN 0704381087.

Nolan, Simon (2000). The Vending Machine of Justice. UK: Quartet Books. ISBN 0704381060.

Nolan, Simon (2010). Whitehawk. UK: Revenge Ink. ISBN 978-0955807879.
