= Yield to the Night (novel) =

1954 novel

- First edition
- Author: Joan Henry
- Language: English
- Genre: Drama
- Publisher: Gollancz
- Publication date: 1954
- Publication place: United Kingdom
- Media type: Print

Yield to the Night is a 1954 novel by the British writer Joan Henry. Henry had served a prison sentence in 1951 for passing fraudulent cheques and had written a bestselling book Who Lie in Gaol based on her experiences. She followed this up with Yield to the Night a fictional story about a woman sentenced to death for murder.

== Film adaptation ==
In 1956 it was adapted into a film of the same title directed by J. Lee Thompson and starring Diana Dors, Yvonne Mitchell and Michael Craig.

== Bibliography ==
- Chibnall, Steve. J. Lee Thompson. Manchester University Press, 2021.
- Goble, Alan. The Complete Index to Literary Sources in Film. Walter de Gruyter, 1999.
- Schwan, Anne. Convict Voices: Women, Class, and Writing about Prison in Nineteenth-Century England. University of New Hampshire Press, 2 Dec 2014.
