= Region 1 =

Region 1 or Region I may refer to:

== Government ==
- Region 1, Northwest Territories, a Statistics Canada census division
- Former Region 1 (Johannesburg), an administrative district in the city of Johannesburg, South Africa, from 2000 to 2006
- Ilocos Region (designated as Region I), an administrative region in the Philippines
- Region 1, an administrative region in Iran

== Technology ==
- DVD region 1, one of the DVD regions
- ITU Region 1, consisting of the Americas
