= Who Lie in Gaol =

1952 novel

- First edition
- Author: Joan Henry
- Language: English
- Genre: Drama
- Publisher: Gollancz
- Publication date: 1952
- Publication place: United Kingdom
- Media type: Print

Who Lie in Gaol is a 1952 work by the British writer Joan Henry. It is semi-autobiographical novel, based on Henry's own experiences serving a prison sentence for passing a fraudulent cheque. The title is drawn from Oscar Wilde's The Ballad of Reading Gaol. She followed the success of the work with another bestseller Yield to the Night.

== Film adaptation ==
In 1953 it was adapted into the film The Weak and the Wicked directed by J. Lee Thompson and starring Glynis Johns, Diana Dors and John Gregson.

== Bibliography ==
- Chibnall, Steve. J. Lee Thompson. Manchester University Press, 2021.
- Goble, Alan. The Complete Index to Literary Sources in Film. Walter de Gruyter, 1999.
- Schwan, Anne. Convict Voices: Women, Class, and Writing about Prison in Nineteenth-Century England. University of New Hampshire Press, 2 Dec 2014.
