= Sheep (novel) =

1994 horror novel by Simon Maginn

- First edition
- Author: Simon Maginn
- Language: English
- Genre: Horror
- Publisher: Corgi
- Publication date: 1994
- Publication place: United Kingdom
- ISBN: 978-0-552-14122-2
- OCLC: 30437492

Sheep is a horror novel by British author Simon Maginn, originally published in 1994 and reissued in 1997. It is now out of print. The book provided the basis for the 2005 film The Dark, although the plot changed drastically in the conversion from book to film. It was Maginn's debut novel.

== Plot ==
A young family moves to rural Wales to renovate a farmhouse and recover from the drowning death of their daughter, Ruthie. While there, the family witnesses a series of terrible mutilations of sheep by an unknown perpetrator.

== Editions ==
- Paperback, Corgi, 1994. ISBN 0-552-14122-4
- Hardbound, Severn House, 1995. ISBN 0-7278-4829-1
- Paperback, White Wolf, 1997. ISBN 1-56504-910-1
