= Yield to the Night =

1956 British film by J. Lee Thompson

- Theatrical poster for the US release of Yield to the Night (1956)
- Directed by: J. Lee Thompson
- Written by: John Cresswell; Joan Henry
- Based on: Yield to the Night by Joan Henry
- Produced by: Kenneth Harper
- Starring: Diana Dors; Yvonne Mitchell; Michael Craig
- Cinematography: Gilbert Taylor
- Edited by: Richard Best
- Music by: Ray Martin
- Distributed by: Associated British-Pathé
- Release date: 14 June 1956 (London)
- Running time: 99 minutes
- Country: United Kingdom
- Language: English
- Box office: £174,911

Yield to the Night is a 1956 British crime drama film directed by J. Lee Thompson and starring Diana Dors, Yvonne Mitchell and Michael Craig. It was written by John Cresswell and Joan Henry based on Henry's 1954 novel Yield to the Night.

The storyline bears a superficial and coincidental resemblance to the Ruth Ellis case, which had occurred the previous year but subsequent to the release of Henry's novel. The film received much positive critical attention, particularly for the unexpectedly skilled acting of Dors, who had previously been cast solely as a British version of the typical "blonde bombshell".

== Premise ==
Mary Hilton has been convicted of murder and sentenced to death by hanging, and she spends her final weeks in a condemned cell in a British women’s prison. During this time, she reflects on the events of her life that led to the crime.

== Cast ==
- Diana Dors as Mary Hilton
- Yvonne Mitchell as Matron Hilda MacFarlane
- Michael Craig as Jim Lancaster
- Marie Ney as Prison Governess
- Geoffrey Keen as Prison Chaplain
- Liam Redmond as Prison Doctor
- Olga Lindo as Senior Matron Hill
- Joan Miller as Matron Barker
- Marjorie Rhodes as Matron Brandon
- Molly Urquhart as Matron Mason
- Mary Mackenzie as Matron Maxwell
- Harry Locke as Fred Hilton
- Michael Ripper as Roy, bar good-timer
- Joyce Blair as Doris, shopgirl-friend
- Charles Clay as Bob
- Athene Seyler as Miss Bligh
- Mona Washbourne as Mrs. Thomas, landlady
- Alec Finter as Mr. Thomas, landlord
- Mercia Shaw as Lucy
- Marianne Stone as New Matron Richardson
- Charles Lloyd-Pack as Mary's lawyer
- Dandy Nichols as Mrs. Price
- John Charlesworth as Alan Price

== Production ==
The film was based on a book by Joan Henry, a writer and former debutante who had gone to prison. Henry wrote a memoir about her experiences which was filmed as The Weak and the Wicked (1954), directed by J. Lee Thompson and starring Diana Dors. Thompson married Henry and they decided to collaborate on another movie. Thompson was anti-capital punishment and wanted to do a story about a man in a death cell. Henry said she could not write about a man but might be able to do it about a woman. "So he really gave me the idea, and then I showed him a plan", she said. The novel of Yield to the Night was published in 1954.

The storyline bore some similarities to the Ruth Ellis case but Henry wrote the story and script during the filming of The Weak and the Wicked. Dors (who had been briefly acquainted with Ellis on the film Lady Godiva Rides Again in 1951) said it "wasn’t about Ruth Ellis at all. Everybody thinks it was but the script was written two years before Ruth Ellis committed the murder. It's a fascinating syndrome that all this was put down on paper before it happened."

Thompson later said "For capital punishment you must take somebody who deserves to die, and then feel sorry for them and say this is wrong. We did that in Yield to the Night: we made it a ruthless, premeditated murder."

According to Thompson the studio wanted to cast Olivia de Havilland in the lead "but I refused pointblank.I refused to make it at all unless they made it with Diana. She wanted to play it and I knew she could."

Dors said this "was the first time I ever had a chance to play such a part. I was very thankful to Lee J. Thompson for having faith in me. Until then everybody thought I was just a joke, and certainly not an actress to be taken seriously, even though I knew within myself I was capable of playing other roles. The big problem was trying to convince other people."

Filming started at Elstree Studios on 2 November 1955.

Michael Craig said Thompson was "a small, very intense man with a violent temper, which could be provoked by practically anything or nothing. He had a nervous habit of tearing sheets of paper into long thin strips." Craig thought Dors was "terrific... one of the most free-spirited and professional actresses I worked with."

Despite the film's success Dors never worked with Thompson again.

== Reception ==
The Monthly Film Bulletin wrote: "Assessment of Yield to the Night can only be made on two levels, those of the film itself: the study of a young woman awaiting execution for murder; and the novelettish flashbacks full of rejected and unfaithful lovers, etc. With this latter material we are in familiar screen territory – extensive London location shooting, a flashy camera style, wafer-thin characterisation and improbable motivation. On the film's other level a definite attempt has been made, in the writing and presentation, objectively to penetrate the condemned cell and the doomed psychology of the murderess. As a plea against capital punishment, however, the producers' conception of their drama seems to lack passion, and this makes it difficult to assimilate the film's emotional climate. Diana Dors, her natural exuberance muted, plays Mary Hilton touchingly, evoking gradual but positive sympathy."

Variety called it "a grim form of entertainment."

Filmink called it "a masterpiece, a stunningly good drama, where Dors plays a character who never asks for sympathy but gets it anyway: she's guilty of the crime, isn’t friendly to her family or death penalty protestors, still loves the louse who drove her to murder. The movie is full of little touches that speak volumes for Henry's personal experience in prison – the routine of changing guards, the conversations, the way the seconds drag on by, the visiting officials, the small privileges, the overwhelming pressure of the longing for a reprieve – and the final moments are devastating: it's one of the best British movies of the decade."

Leslie Halliwell said: "Gloomy prison melodrama vaguely based on the Ruth Ellis case and making an emotional plea against capital punishment."

In British Sound Films: The Studio Years 1928–1959 David Quinlan rated the film as "good", writing: "Convincing, if unrelievedly grim drama that proved its glamorous leading lady really could act."

The Radio Times Guide to Films gave the film 3/5 stars, writing: "Directed with a grim sense of purpose by J Lee Thompson, this sincere plea for the abolition of capital punishment was based on the case of Ruth Ellis, the last woman in Britain to be hanged and whose story was retold some 30 years later with a good deal more style by Mike Newell in Dance with a Stranger. Diana Dors gives one of the best performances of her career as the murderess recalling the circumstances that drove her to kill while waiting to hear if she will be reprieved."

== Accolades ==
The movie was nominated for the Palme d'Or at the 1956 Cannes Film Festival.

== In popular culture ==
An image of Diana Dors in a cell from the film was used on the cover of the Smiths' Singles album.
