= J. Lee Thompson =

English filmmaker (1914–2002)

- Thompson in the 1970s
- Born: John Lee Thompson; 1 August 1914; Bristol, England
- Died: 30 August 2002 (aged 88); Sooke, British Columbia, Canada
- Occupations: Film director; screenwriter; producer
- Years active: 1937–1989

John Lee Thompson (1 August 1914 – 30 August 2002) was an English filmmaker and playwright. Initially an exponent of social realism, he became known as a versatile and prolific director of thrillers, action, and adventure films.

His works included mainstream critical and commercial successes like Woman in a Dressing Gown (1957), Ice Cold in Alex (1958), Tiger Bay (1959), North West Frontier (also 1959), The Guns of Navarone (1961), the original Cape Fear (1962), and Mackenna's Gold (1969). He also directed cult classics like the Planet of the Apes sequels, The White Buffalo (1977), Happy Birthday to Me (1981), King Solomon's Mines (1985) and several Charles Bronson vehicles for Cannon Films in the 1980s.

Thompson received an Academy Award nomination for Best Director for The Guns of Navarone. He was also a four-time BAFTA Award nominee (twice for Best Film and twice for Outstanding British Film). He also received accolades from the Berlin International Film Festival and the Cannes Film Festival, and was both a Golden Globe and Directors Guild of America Award nominee.

== Early life ==
Thompson was born in the Bristol suburb of Westbury on Trym on 1 August 1914. His family had links to the theatre. Thompson studied at Dover College then went to work in the theatre, joining the Nottingham Repertory Company as an actor and stagehand. He later went to work for a repertory company in Croydon, Surrey.

He wrote plays in his spare time, continuing a hobby he had started at the age of nine. One of them, Murder Happens? was performed at Croydon in 1934. His second staged play, Double Error, had a brief West End run at the Fortune Theatre in 1935. An article from this time about the play said he had written 40 plays already, including four in between his first two staged plays. A company worth £10,000 was formed to exploit Thompson's writings over the next seven years but this appears to have not had a long life.

Thompson later said he had written a part for himself to perform, but when management asked him if he wanted to do so he said "of course not," and "the die was cast. Later I decided if I didn't have the guts to admit I wanted to play the role I should never act again and I never did."

=== Screenwriter ===
The film rights to Double Error were purchased for £100. Thompson was hired to work in the scriptwriting department at British International Pictures at Elstree Studios. While there he made his one appearance as an actor in films, playing a small role in Midshipman Easy (1935).

His first credit was The Price of Folly (1937), based on his play. He also worked on the scripts for Glamorous Night (1937), and he worked as dialogue coach on Jamaica Inn (1939), directed by Alfred Hitchcock.

He wrote the scripts for The Middle Watch (1940), made at Associated British Picture Corporation (ABPC) and East of Piccadilly (1941).

=== World War II ===
Thompson served in World War II as a tailgunner and wireless operator in the RAF. In 1942 a revised version of Double Error, titled Murder Without Crime, opened at the Comedy Theatre in London. The play had a run on Broadway in 1943.

=== Post-war ===
After the war Thompson returned to his work as scriptwriter under contract at Associated British on such films as No Place for Jennifer (1949) and For Them That Trespass (1949), the latter starring Richard Todd in his debut.

Thompson was dialogue director on The Hasty Heart (1949), which turned Todd into a star. He later said he gave up dialogue directing because he found the job "impossible. My job was to take stars through their lines but I felt that I was also expected to be a spy for the front office. If a word was altered they wanted to know why. It was a way of keeping control."

The same year his play The Human Touch, co-written with Dudley Leslie, ran for more than a hundred performances at the Savoy Theatre in a production starring Alec Guinness.

== British film director ==
=== Early films ===
His first film as a director was Murder Without Crime (1950), made at ABPC, who put Thompson under contract. Thompson was offered £500 for the screen rights to the play and £500 to direct. He said "it was not so much that I wanted to direct movies it was to get the money so I could continue writing plays. But while directing it I got the feeling that I wanted to be a movie director."

Thompson said "the fact is I found directing to be much easier than writing and I enjoyed it much more than writing as well. So I became a film director."

The film was about a man who thinks he has committed murder. Thompson also wrote the screenplay, based on his own play Double Error. In the words of Thompson's Screenonline profile "this well structured film went largely unnoticed but contained many of the themes which were to characterise Lee Thompson's work: a good person's struggle with their conscience, an external force of evil, and an out-of-character moment of violence which has long-term consequences. Believing people can "commit crimes without being criminals", he sought to make his audiences condone or at least understand behaviour that they would normally condemn."

Thompson's first film success was one he directed and co-wrote (with Anne Burnaby), The Yellow Balloon (1953), the story of a child who is blackmailed into helping a criminal after accidentally causing his friend's death.

He followed it with a comedy, For Better, For Worse (1954) starring Dirk Bogarde, which was even more popular though it is little remembered today.

=== Social Realist films ===
Thompson's fourth film as director The Weak and the Wicked (1954), portrays the lives of women in prison and is based on memoirs by Joan Henry, who became Thompson's second wife. Thompson wrote the script, again in collaboration with Anne Burnaby. It starred Glynis Johns and Diana Dors and was a hit at the box office. The success of the film greatly added to Thompson's prestige and he began to be regarded as one of the leading directors in the country.

Thompson was loaned to Rank Films to direct a Jack Buchanan comedy, As Long as They're Happy (1955), co-starring Dors and An Alligator Named Daisy (1955), also starring Dors, along with Donald Sinden. Thompson said "he didn't like the subjects" of their film "but here was the opportunity to work with another worldbeater - Jeannie Carson." He returned to ABPC and the theme of female prisoners in Yield to the Night (1956), an anti-capital punishment tale with Diana Dors as the condemned prisoner.

Thompson later said the "pattern" of his ABPC films was "two pieces of tepid rubbish for one decent project – if I could persuade Robert Clark, who was head of production. He used to wring his hands when I insisted. 'Okay,' he'd finally say. 'Do it if you must. But it won't make money.' I admired him for that really. He did give you a bit of a chance."

The Good Companions (1957) was lighter fare, based on a book by J. B. Priestley. According to one obituary Thompson "made excellent use of the CinemaScope screen, assembled a fine supporting cast and, with zestful choreography... came up with one of the few successes in a genre for which the British cinema was not noted."

Woman in a Dressing Gown (1957), with Yvonne Mitchell, Anthony Quayle and Sylvia Syms and written by Ted Willis, deals with the collapse of a 20-year marriage. It was a major critical and commercial success, one of the most popular at the British box office in 1957. Several modern critics have cited it as a prototypical version of Kitchen sink realism and precursor to the British New Wave. It won the 1958 Golden Globe Award for Best English-Language Foreign Film.

=== Action director ===
Thompson had a big success with Ice Cold in Alex (1958), the story of a British Army unit trekking across North Africa in the Second World War. It featured John Mills, Sylvia Syms, Anthony Quayle and Harry Andrews. It won three BAFTA Awards, including Best British Film. He followed it with style="background:#FFC7C7;color:black;vertical-align:middle;text-align:center;" class="table-no skin-invert"|North West Frontier (1959), an adventure film set in British India starring Kenneth More and Lauren Bacall. It was one of the most popular films in Britain in 1959.

No Trees in the Street (1959) was a thriller written by Willis. Also in that genre was Tiger Bay (1959), starring John Mills. It introduced cinema audiences to Mills' daughter Hayley and German actor Horst Buchholz. Hayley Mills also earned a BAFTA for Most Promising Newcomer portraying a 12-year-old girl who refuses to betray a sailor accused of murder.

Thompson followed this with I Aim at the Stars (1960).

== Hollywood career ==
=== Guns of Navarone and Cape Fear ===
Thompson vaulted to international fame with The Guns of Navarone (1961) as a last-minute replacement for director Alexander Mackendrick. His take-charge attitude during its production earned him the nickname 'Mighty Mouse' from lead actor Gregory Peck. Co-star Anthony Quinn said Thompson:

Never read a scene until he had to shoot it and approached each shot on a whim. And yet the cumulative effect was astonishing. Lee Thompson made a marvelous picture but how? Perhaps his inventiveness lay in defying convention, in rejecting the accepted methods of motion picture making and establishing his own. Perhaps it was in his very formlessness that he found the one form he could sustain, and nurture, the one form that could, in turn, sustain and nurture him. Perhaps he was just a lucky Englishman who pulled a good picture out of his ass.

The Guns of Navarone, a World War II epic filmed on location in Rhodes, Greece, was nominated for seven Academy Awards including Thompson for Best Director. In 1961 he said "primarily I am in the business to entertain. This does not mean that I never want to try artistic movies again. But I do not think you can sell art on the big movie circuits. Art belongs in the art houses." Later he said "I liked the character bits best" about Navarone. "Anyone can make an explosion."

The success of Navarone won him entry into Hollywood, where he directed Cape Fear (1962), a psychological thriller with Gregory Peck, Robert Mitchum, Polly Bergen and Lori Martin; Peck and Mitchum co-producing the film. Based on a novel called The Executioners by John D. MacDonald, Cape Fear shows how a sex offender can manipulate the justice system and terrorise an entire family. Highly controversial for its time, the film was cut heavily in both the United States and the United Kingdom.

He worked on a project with Warren Beatty and Clifford Odets based on an idea of Beatty's. It was never made. Neither was The Short Cut which he discussed doing with Darryl F. Zanuck, or The Living Room from a novel by Graham Greene or Chips with Everything by Arnold Wesker.

=== Mirisch Brothers ===
Thompson directed Yul Brynner in the Cossack epic Taras Bulba (1962) for producer Harold Hecht. Thompson was going to follow it with Big Charlie starring Brynner but the movie was not made. In 1962 the Mirisch Brothers signed the director to a four-picture contract. The first film made under this contract was the Mayan Indian epic Kings of the Sun (1963), starring Brynner.

In September 1962 Thompson said he would make I Love Louisa with Elizabeth Taylor produced by Arthur Jacobs. (This film became What a Way to Go! (1964) with Shirley MacLaine.) He would put actors under personal contract like Talitha Pol.

In September 1963 Thompson announced he had formed a company, Bowhall Productions, to make around four films a year in the $120,000-$160,000 budget range. Thompson said it was "unlikely" the films would "make a profit" but they were movies he "deeply wanted to make". They included Chips with Everything, Rose without a Thorn by Clifford Bax, and a film in Spain. Following Return from the Ashes he would also make a $7 million movie in Africa Thunder of Giants.

Instead he did another with MacLaine, John Goldfarb, Please Come Home (1965). Back in England Thompson made Return from the Ashes (1965) for the Mirisch Brothers. In April 1965 Thompson announced he would make High Citadel based on a novel by Desmond Bagley for the Mirisch Brothers. These plans were postponed when Thompson received an offer to replace Michael Anderson, who had fallen ill before he was to start directing a thriller about cults with David Niven, Eye of the Devil (1967) (originally titled 13). High Citadel was never filmed. Another film announced but never filmed was The Case Against Colonel Sutton which he was going to do with producer Martin Poll. Neither was a proposed musical remake of The Private Lives of Henry VIII.

After a war film, Before Winter Comes (1968) Thompson was reunited with the star, producer and writer of Navarone in the Western Mackenna's Gold (1969) but it did poorly at the box office. So too did the espionage tale The Chairman (1969) with Gregory Peck. He was meant to follow that with You?, about assassination from a script by Andrew Sinclair. It was never filmed. "I freely admit I've done some pretty bad stuff," he said in 1968. "It's entirely my own fault. The trouble was I accepted some dismal scripts. I wasn't tough enough... Writing is the fundamental thing." Some have argued that Thompson's creative decline coincided with the end of his relationship with Henry.

=== Apes Movies ===
Back in the UK he directed Country Dance, also known as Brotherly Love (1970). Thompson's handling of a smaller scale film impressed producer Arthur Jacobs, with whom Thompson had made What a Way to Go; Thompson was the first director attached to the Jacobs production The Planet of the Apes and Thompson says he turned down the first two sequels. He was available to make the fourth and fifth movies in the series, Conquest of the Planet of the Apes and Battle for the Planet of the Apes. Writer Paul Dehn said Thompson had a reputation as someone with a drinking problem but that he had overcome it by the time of the Apes films.

"They were cutting back on the budgets the whole time after the first one", said Thompson later. "It was a bad policy."

== Later career ==
=== US Television ===
Thompson began working more in US television, directing the television films A Great American Tragedy (1972), Huckleberry Finn (1974) starring Jeff East and Paul Winfield, The Reincarnation of Peter Proud (1974) and Widow (1976) as well as the pilot episode of The Blue Knight (1975).

He returned to playwriting with Getting Away with Murder (1976).

=== Charles Bronson ===
In 1976, Thompson began a long collaboration with actor Charles Bronson on the Warner Bros. crime story St. Ives . John Crowther, who worked with both men, later said "Thompson was the total antithesis of Charlie and they got along famously. They really worked well together".

In 1977, Bronson and Thompson teamed again on an unconventional western film called The White Buffalo.

Thompson directed two films starring Anthony Quinn, The Greek Tycoon and The Passage. Reviewing the latter, The Guardian called Thompson a director who "should know better but often doesn't". The Globe and Mail argued Thompson was "possibly the worst experienced director working in the world today."

Thompson directed the horror film, Happy Birthday to Me in 1980.

In 1981 Thompson and Bronson made the film Caboblanco, which opened in Los Angeles on 24 April. Also that year he directed an episode of the TV show Code Red, which he followed with another Bronson movie, 10 to Midnight.

Thompson worked with Bronson again on, The Evil That Men Do (1984), which was shot in Mexico. Thompson was hired to replace original director Fielder Cook, who was fired shortly before filming began. Producer Pancho Kohner said Thompson "knew exactly what shots he needed to put together the film... [Bronson] had a lot of respect for Lee. The whole crew appreciated when the director did not make them work over and over to get the same shot from different angles... He was just a terrific filmmaker".

Also released that year was The Ambassador, starring Robert Mitchum.

On 22 November 1985, King Solomon's Mines premiered. Thompson made this film as an Indiana Jones-style pastiche. It was shot in Zimbabwe and starred Richard Chamberlain. The film was reasonably successful at the box office.

On 18 April 1986, Murphy's Law, the Thompson and Bronson collaboration of that year, started its theatrical run. It is a neo-noir thriller film. Acting in the film are Kathleen Wilhoite, Carrie Snodgress, Robert F. Lyons, and Richard Romanus. Thompson tried another Indiana Jones-type tale with Firewalker, which premiered on 21 November. The film paired the actors Chuck Norris with Louis Gossett Jr. as its leads. The action adventure co-stars Will Sampson and Melody Anderson. Norris and Gossett play Max Donigan and Leo Porter, two soldiers of fortune, whose adventures rarely result in any notable gain. They are befriended by an inscrutable woman of mystery Patricia (Anderson). Patricia's map leads them on a quest for treasure in Central America. The name of the movie comes from the powerful guardian of the treasure.

Now working exclusively for Cannon, Thompson made two more Charles Bronson thrillers. On 6 November 1987 Death Wish 4: The Crackdown was released and 16 September 1988 saw the opening of Messenger of Death. He later reflected, "I realized these films were not going to enhance my reputation. I had to live with that. You're not going to be offered the great films at a certain age."

In February 1989, Thompson's final directorial effort was released Kinjite: Forbidden Subjects starring Charles Bronson.

In 1990, Thompson moved to Sooke, British Columbia, Canada.

In 1992, Thompson said he was trying to finance a remake of Tiger Bay with Anna Chlumsky and Alec Baldwin. The director said "I have certain regrets now. I would rather have stuck to making films like Yield to the Night which had some integrity and importance. But the British film industry caved in. I shouldn't denigrate myself too much because I have enjoyed making my films but I suppose I sort of sold out."

== Personal life ==
Thompson was married three times. His first wife was Florence Bailey, whom he married in 1935 when he was 20. They had a son, Peter (1938–1997), who became a film editor on several of his father's films and predeceased him, and a daughter, Lesley, who survived him. They divorced in 1957.

His second wife was prisoner and author Joan Henry, whom he married in 1958. They collaborated on Weak and the Wicked and Yield to the Night. He left her for actress Susan Hampshire. In March 1962 Hedda Hopper reported that Thompson was "sweating it out" in Los Angeles while Henry and Hampshire were "awaiting his decision in London." Thompson confirmed this in an interview, and Hampshire and Henry were less forthcoming to the press.

In September, Hopper reported that it was over between Thompson and Hampshire. Henry and Thompson were divorced in the late 1960s.

In November 1962, Thompson said he had proposed to Shirley Ann Field who he said accepted then changed her mind.

His third wife was Penny, who was his widow.

=== Death ===
Thompson died of congestive heart failure on 30 August 2002, at his holiday home in Sooke, British Columbia, aged 88.

== Critical appraisal ==
The Guardian obituary called him "a compelling craftsman". The Washington Post said "he directed adventure films noted for their punchy pacing, rich atmosphere and nuanced characterization." Variety said he was "Known as a craftsman who had a clear sense of how each film should play, scene by scene".

The Independent said "he lent his acute sense of atmosphere and vivid visual style to a wide range of material. His intimate kitchen-sink melodramas... were unflinching portraits of social realism unusually stark for their time. His thrillers were tautly edited exercises in suspense, and he also made some engaging comedies and a bracing musical...Though his later films can most kindly be labelled potboilers, his body of work in the Fifties and early Sixties was an impressive one."

In a 2000 interview with the Times Colonist, he stated that he made so many American films "because of my insecurity and effort to stay here. If I was given a script and it had something good in it I'd say, 'Good, I've got my next picture!' That is not the way to make good films, so some of them were good and some not so good.... What an idiot! 'You should have stayed at what you really wanted to make.' If I have anything to say to young directors today it's don't make a film for the sake of making it. Make it only if you really believe in it. Then success will eventually come to you."

== Filmography ==
=== Film ===
Year	Title	Functioned as			Notes
Year	Title	Director	Writer	Producer	Notes
1950	Murder Without Crime	Yes	Yes	No	
1953	The Yellow Balloon	Yes	Yes	No	
1954	For Better, for Worse	Yes	Yes	No	
1954	The Weak and the Wicked	Yes	Yes	No	
1955	As Long as They're Happy	Yes	No	No	
1955	An Alligator Named Daisy	Yes	No	No	
1956	Yield to the Night	Yes	No	No	
1957	The Good Companions	Yes	No	Yes	
1957	Woman in a Dressing Gown	Yes	No	Yes	
1958	Ice Cold in Alex	Yes	No	No	
1959	North West Frontier	Yes	No	No	
1959	No Trees in the Street	Yes	No	Yes	
1959	Tiger Bay	Yes	No	No	
1960	I Aim at the Stars	Yes	No	No	
1961	The Guns of Navarone	Yes	No	No	
1962	Cape Fear	Yes	No	No	
1962	Taras Bulba	Yes	No	No	
1963	Kings of the Sun	Yes	No	No	
1964	What a Way to Go!	Yes	No	No	
1965	John Goldfarb, Please Come Home	Yes	No	Yes	
1965	Return from the Ashes	Yes	No	Yes	
1967	Eye of the Devil	Yes	No	No	
1969	Mackenna's Gold	Yes	No	No	
1969	Before Winter Comes	Yes	No	No	
1969	The Chairman	Yes	No	No	
1970	Country Dance	Yes	No	No	
1972	Conquest of the Planet of the Apes	Yes	No	No	
1973	Battle for the Planet of the Apes	Yes	No	No	
1974	Huckleberry Finn	Yes	No	No	
1975	The Reincarnation of Peter Proud	Yes	No	No	
1976	St. Ives	Yes	No	No	
1977	The White Buffalo	Yes	No	No	
1978	The Greek Tycoon	Yes	No	No	
1979	The Passage	Yes	No	No	
1980	Caboblanco	Yes	No	No	
1981	Happy Birthday to Me	Yes	No	No	
1983	10 to Midnight	Yes	Story	No	
1984	The Evil That Men Do	Yes	No	No	
1984	The Ambassador	Yes	No	No	
1985	King Solomon's Mines	Yes	No	No	
1986	Murphy's Law	Yes	No	No	
1986	Firewalker	Yes	No	No	
1987	Death Wish 4: The Crackdown	Yes	No	No	
1988	Messenger of Death	Yes	No	No	
1989	Kinjite: Forbidden Subjects	Yes	No	No	

==== Writer only ====
Year	Title	Director	Notes
1940	The Middle Watch	Thomas Bentley	Co-written with Clifford Grey
1941	East of Piccadilly	Harold Huth	Co-written with Lesley Storm
1949	For Them That Trespass	Alberto Cavalcanti	
1950	Last Holiday	Henry Cass	Additional dialogue
1950	No Place for Jennifer	Henry Cass	
1986	Future Hunters	Cirio H. Santiago	

=== Television ===
Year	Title	Functioned as			Notes
Year	Title	Director	Writer	Producer	Notes
1972	A Great American Tragedy	Yes	No	No	TV movie
1975	The Blue Knight	Yes	No	No	Episode: "Pilot"
1976	Widow	Yes	No	No	TV movie
1981	Code Red	Yes	No	No	Episode: "Pilot"

== Awards and nominations ==
Institution	Year	Category	Work	Result	Ref.
Academy Awards	1962	Best Director	The Guns of Navarone	Nominated	
British Academy Film Awards	1960	Best Film	Tiger Bay	Nominated	
British Academy Film Awards	1960	Best Film	North West Frontier	Nominated	
British Academy Film Awards	1960	Outstanding British Film	Tiger Bay	Nominated	
British Academy Film Awards	1960	Outstanding British Film	North West Frontier	Nominated	
Berlin International Film Festival	1957	Golden Bear	Woman in a Dressing Gown	Nominated	
Berlin International Film Festival	1957	FIPRESCI Prize	Woman in a Dressing Gown	Won	
Berlin International Film Festival	1957	Special Mention	Woman in a Dressing Gown	Won	
Berlin International Film Festival	1958	Golden Bear	Ice Cold in Alex	Nominated	
Berlin International Film Festival	1958	FIPRESCI Prize	Ice Cold in Alex	Won	
Berlin International Film Festival	1959	Golden Bear	Tiger Bay	Nominated	
Cannes Film Festival	1956	Palme d'Or	Yield to the Night	Nominated	
Directors Guild of America	1961	Outstanding Directing	The Guns of Navarone	Nominated	
Golden Globe Awards	1958	Best English-Language Foreign Film	Woman in a Dressing Gown	Won	
Golden Globe Awards	1962	Best Director	The Guns of Navarone	Nominated	
