= Joan Henry =

English novelist, playwright and screenwriter (1914–2000)

- Born: Joan Constance Anne Henry; 8 April 1914; Belgravia, London
- Died: 16 December 2000 (aged 86); London, England
- Spouse(s): Donald Standage (1938 – c. 1950); J. Lee Thompson (1958 – late 1960s)
- Children: One daughter (with Standage)
- Writing career
- Notable works: Who Lie in Gaol; Yield to the Night; Look on Tempests

Joan Constance Anne Henry (8 April 1914 – 16 December 2000) was an English novelist, playwright and screenwriter. A former débutante from an illustrious family, she was jailed for passing a fraudulent cheque in 1951 and her best-known works were based on her experiences in prison. She wrote the semi-autobiographical Who Lie in Gaol, filmed as The Weak and the Wicked, and the novel Yield to the Night, the basis for the film starring Diana Dors.

== Early years ==
Henry was born on 8 April 1914 in Belgravia, London. She was descended from Prime Ministers John Russell (her great-great-grandfather) and Robert Peel, and was the cousin once removed of Bertrand Russell. She was raised by grandparents in Ireland after her parents separated. After returning to England and finishing her education, she made her society début in 1932. She had a twin sister, who died at the age of 21.

In 1938 she married army officer Donald Standage; the couple had one daughter. The marriage broke down in the late 1940s and they were divorced by 1950. After getting into debt through gambling, Henry accepted a forged cheque from a friend as a loan. She was convicted at the Old Bailey in 1951 and sentenced to 12 months imprisonment; though the Daily Telegraph's obituary claims "...she was naïve enough not to realise that the cheque had been forged". She served eight months, the majority at Holloway prison, and also at Askham Grange open prison. At the latter, she came under the care of Anglo-Irish prison reformer Mary Size, who she later described in her 1952 book Who Lie in Gaol as "a mixture of discipline and humanity."

== Career ==
Before her imprisonment, Henry earned a living writing romance novels. She came to prominence in 1952 with the publication of Who Lie in Gaol (the title was taken from a line in Oscar Wilde's The Ballad of Reading Gaol), based on her experiences in prison, which became a best-seller. Henry was critical of Holloway prison, giving accounts of brutal treatment and neglect she had witnessed. The book was the basis for the film The Weak and the Wicked (1953), directed by J. Lee Thompson with Glynis Johns playing a character based on Henry.

Yield to the Night (the title was taken from Book VII of the Iliad), a novel following a woman awaiting execution, was published in 1954. A film version was released in 1956 with Diana Dors in the lead role. Henry co-wrote the script, which was nominated for a BAFTA Award for Best British Screenplay. The film was again directed by Lee Thompson, whom Henry married in 1958.

In 1960 Henry's play Look on Tempests was staged at the Comedy Theatre in London's West End. It continued Henry's focus on the justice system, depicting the effect on the upper middle class family of a man accused of gross indecency, and became the first play dealing with homosexuality to be approved for performance by the Lord Chamberlain, who had lifted a ban on the subject the previous year.

Henry also wrote two television plays, Rough Justice in 1962 and Person to Person in 1967. She and Lee Thompson divorced in the late 1960s.
