= Promise at Dawn =

Promise at Dawn may refer to:

- Promise at Dawn (novel), 1960 autobiographical novel by Romain Gary
- Promise at Dawn (1970 film), American film directed by Jules Dassin based on the novel
- Promise at Dawn (2017 film), Franco-Belgian film directed by Éric Barbier based on the novel
