= White Dog =

White dog or White Dog may refer to:

- White Dog (Gary novel), a novel by Romain Gary
- White Dog (Temple novel), a novel by Peter Temple
- White Dog (1982 film), a 1982 film by Samuel Fuller
- White Dog (2022 film), a 2022 film adaptation by Anaïs Barbeau-Lavalette of the Gary novel
- A dog with a white coat of fur
- White dog, the unaged spirit distilled from fermented mash in bourbon production
- Whitedog, Ontario, Canada

== See also ==
- White Dawg (born Billy Alsbrooks, Jr., 1974), American rapper
