= The Roots of Heaven =

The Roots of Heaven may refer to:

- The Roots of Heaven (film), a 1958 American adventure film
- The Roots of Heaven (novel), a 1956 Romain Gary novel
