= Elijah Moshinsky =

Australian opera director (1946–2021)

Elijah Moshinsky (8 January 1946 – 14 January 2021) was an Australian opera director, theatre director and television director who worked for the Royal Opera House, the Metropolitan Opera, the Royal National Theatre, and BBC Television, among other organisations.

== Early years ==
Moshinsky's Russian Jewish parents had fled from Vladivostok to the French Concession of Shanghai, where Elijah was born. When he was five years old, the family moved to Melbourne. He attended Camberwell High School and then was an under-graduate resident at Ormond College, where in 1965 he was the set designer of a stage adaptation of Kafka's The Trial. Moshinsky supported himself as an undergraduate by playing the third flute at the Melbourne Symphony Orchestra. In 1969, he directed Beckett's Krapp's Last Tape with Max Gillies at the Alexander Theatre at Monash University. He graduated from the University of Melbourne and in 1973 won a scholarship to St Antony's College, Oxford, where he specialised in the study of Alexander Herzen.

While still at St Antony's, Moshinsky directed a production of As You Like It for the Oxford and Cambridge Shakespeare Company. When Sir John Tooley, the General Director at Covent Garden, saw the play, he offered Moshinsky a post as a staff producer for The Royal Opera.

== Opera director ==
In 1975, Moshinsky made his operatic debut at the Royal Opera House with "a stripped-down, low-budget production of Peter Grimes [with Jon Vickers] which won enormous popular and critical success." That production was reproduced at the Paris Opera introducing the piece to the French public. It was also presented at La Scala, Tokyo and Los Angeles. Subsequent productions at Covent Garden include Lohengrin, Tannhäuser, The Rake's Progress, Macbeth, Samson and Delilah, Samson, Die Entführung aus dem Serail, Aida (with Cheryl Studer and Sir Edward Downes), Otello (with Plácido Domingo and Carlos Kleiber), Attila, Simon Boccanegra and Stiffelio. At the Metropolitan Opera, he directed Otello, Samson et Dalila and Samson, Un ballo in maschera, Ariadne auf Naxos, The Queen of Spades, The Makropulos Affair, Nabucco and Luisa Miller. For the Lyric Opera of Chicago he directed Samson, The Bartered Bride, Nabucco, Lohengrin, The Pirates of Penzance, Cavalleria rusticana and Pagliacci, Samuel Barber's Antony and Cleopatra. For Welsh Opera he directed Berlioz's Béatrice et Bénédict, Cavalleria rusticanna. For Scottish Opera he directed La bohème and La forza del destino. At English National Opera in 1982, he directed the British premiere of Le Grand Macabre as well as Die Meistersinger von Nürnberg and The Bartered Bride. Other engagements have included Wozzeck for the Adelaide Festival, A Midsummer Night's Dream, Boris Godunov, Il trovatore, The Barber of Seville, Rigoletto, La traviata, Don Carlo with Opera Australia, I vespri siciliani in Geneva and Benvenuto Cellini at the Maggio Musicale in Florence, Stiffelio at La Scala and Vienna. At the Mariinsky Theatre in St Petersburg he directed the original version of La forza del destino. At the Novaya Opera in Moscow he produced The Barber of Seville. Later, he directed Plácido Domingo in Simon Boccanegra at Covent Garden, Los Angeles and at the National Centre for the Performing Arts (NCPA) in Beijing. For the Korea National Opera he created new productions of Don Carlo and Roméo et Juliette. In 2015, he directed Giovanna d'Arco for the Buxton Festival.

== Theatre director ==
For the theatre stage, his credits included Troilus and Cressida and Thomas Bernhard's The Force of Habit at the Royal National Theatre in 1976, and, elsewhere in London: Three Sisters and Robert Storey's Light Up the Sky in 1987, Ivanov, Much Ado About Nothing and Ronald Harwood's Another Time with Albert Finney (all in 1989), Matador (1991), Becket (1991), Ronald Harwood's Reflected Glory (1992), Cyrano de Bergerac (1992–1993), Richard III (1999), plus Shadowlands with Nigel Hawthorne in the UK and on Broadway (1990–1991). He also directed the first production of Nigel Williams' adaptation of Lord of the Flies for the RSC.

== Television director ==
Moshinsky made a number of television films, mostly of operas. Non-operatic works, mainly for the BBC, include a number of Shakespeare's plays, televised between 1980 and 1985: All's Well That Ends Well, A Midsummer Night's Dream, Cymbeline with Helen Mirren, Coriolanus with Alan Howard and Irene Worth, and Love's Labour's Lost. He also directed Judi Dench and Kenneth Branagh in Ibsen's Ghosts (1986) and Richard Brinsley Sheridan's The Rivals (1987). He also directed a three-part serial version of Kingsley Amis' novel The Green Man (1990). In 1993 he directed an adaptation of Romain Gary's novel The Dance of Genghis Cohn. He also directed two documentaries for the BBC: Mozart in Turkey, which was filmed in the Topkapi Palace and Divas in the Arena. He also directed a film of Tippet's The Midsummer Marriage for Channel 4.

== Personal life ==
Moshinsky married Ruth Dyttman in 1970. They had two sons and lived in London.

In January 2021, Moshinsky had a fall at his London home, and was taken to hospital where he contracted COVID-19 during the COVID-19 pandemic in the United Kingdom. He died in London on 14 January 2021.
