= Maria Machado =

Maria Machado may refer to:

- María Corina Machado (born 1967), Venezuelan human rights activist and politician
- Ana Maria Machado (born 1941), Brazilian writer
- Joaquim Maria Machado de Assis (1839–1908), Brazilian novelist and poet
- Maria Clara Machado (1921–2001), Brazilian playwright
- Maria Machado (actress) (born 1937), French actress and stage director
