= The Ski Bum (film) =

1971 film by Bruce D. Clark

- Theatrical release poster
- Directed by: Bruce D. Clark
- Screenplay by: Bruce D. Clark; Marc Siegler
- Based on: The Ski Bum (1965 novel) by Romain Gary
- Produced by: David R. Dawdry
- Starring: Zalman King; Charlotte Rampling; Joseph Mell; Dimitra Arliss; Tedd King; Dwight Marfield
- Cinematography: Vilmos Zsigmond
- Edited by: Bruce D. Clark; Misha Norland
- Music by: Joseph Byrd
- Production company: Joseph E. Levine Productions
- Distributed by: Avco Embassy
- Release date: January 8, 1971 (San Francisco)
- Running time: 95 minutes (Note: A few sources, including Leonard Maltin's Movie Guide, give a running time of 136 minutes, but this is contradicted by the American Film Institute Catalog and the contemporary New York Times review. The longer time may be a misprint for 1 hour 36 minutes.)
- Country: United States
- Language: English
- Budget: $750,000

The Ski Bum is a 1971 American drama film directed, co-written, and edited by Bruce D. Clark, starring Zalman King and Charlotte Rampling. It is loosely based on the 1965 novel by Romain Gary. It was released by AVCO Embassy Pictures on January 8, 1971.

== Plot ==
Ski instructor Johnny is carrying on a romance with Samantha, a married woman who also serves as the hostess at a ski lodge. Samantha coaxes Jack into giving skiing lessons to the Stones, a rich family whose patriarch is the head of a mysterious company planning to take over the resort.

== Cast ==
- Zalman King as Johnny
- Charlotte Rampling as Samantha
- Joseph Mell as Burt Stone
- Dimitra Arliss as Liz Stone
- Tedd King as Maxwell Enderby
- Dwight Marfield as Doctor Walter Graham
- Freddie James as Brad Stone
- Lori Shelle as Lisa Stone
- Pierre Jalbert as Roger
- Anna Karen Morrow as Golda Lanning
- Paul Jabara as Rocco
- Michael Lerner as Rod
- Don Campbell as Randy
- Noah Keen as Marty
- David Chow as Otto
- Penelope Spheeris as Star the Witch
- Deborah Smaller as Janey

== Production ==
Joseph E. Levine bought the rights to make a film out of Gary's novel in 1964, but spent years trying to get a suitable screenplay; those who worked on the project included author and critic Hollis Alpert and Sidney Carroll. At various times Peter O'Toole, Christopher Jones, Warren Beatty and Jon Voight were reportedly considered for the starring role; Robert Redford was also approached but turned the part down. In 1966, Anatole Litvak was attached to direct with O'Toole in the lead role and Martin Poll producing, but the production collapsed due to disagreements over the script. O'Toole and Poll were reassigned to The Lion in Winter, and Levine sued Litvak over breach of contract.

Finally Levine gave a trio of UCLA film graduate students a $750,000 budget and free rein to do what they wanted, resulting in a film that had little to do with original book. The film was submitted as the trio's Master of Fine Arts project. Shooting took place entirely on-location in Vail, Colorado.

== Release ==
The film opened at the Warfield Theatre in San Francisco, but closed after one week.

== Reception ==
Roger Greenspun of The New York Times wrote, "Almost everybody in The Ski Bum is first rate, much too good for the material, with special honors to Joseph Mell as the ubiquitous Burt Stone and Lori Shelle as his emotionally mature daughter."

Gene Siskel of the Chicago Tribune gave the film zero stars out of four and wrote that the young filmmakers "are moderately successful only when photographing snow. Each scene involving what they think is human interaction is either sick or sickly. The film's electronic music and many echo chamber sound effects (which signal trauma) end up being the equivalent of scratches on a blackboard."

A review in Variety read that the changes from the novel to the film were "mostly for the worst" and that there was "very little to say about the final cut, since film has so little to say itself."

Jeanne Miller of The San Francisco Examiner called the film "an earnest, thoughtful, but ultimately unsuccessful attempt to portray the anguish of its existential hero, a primitive drifter hopelessly trapped in the externals of a materialistic society ... [the filmmakers] seem to view the corporate greed of this affluent society as an insidious poison that inevitably affects everyone it touches. Unfortunately, they were unable to translate their concept into fluid, moving or authoritative cinematic terms."
