= Lady L =

- Original film poster by Robert McGinnis
- Directed by: Peter Ustinov
- Screenplay by: Peter Ustinov
- Based on: Lady L 1958 novel by Romain Gary
- Produced by: Carlo Ponti
- Starring: Sophia Loren; Paul Newman; David Niven
- Cinematography: Henri Alekan
- Edited by: Roger Dwyre
- Music by: Jean Françaix
- Distributed by: Metro-Goldwyn-Mayer
- Release dates: 25 November 1965; (World Premiere, London)
- Running time: 117 minutes
- Countries: France; Italy; United Kingdom
- Language: English
- Box office: $2.7 million (est. US/ Canada rentals)

Lady L is a 1965 comedy film based on the novel by Romain Gary and directed by Peter Ustinov. Starring Sophia Loren, Paul Newman, David Niven and Cecil Parker, the film focuses on an elderly English Duchess as she recalls the loves of her life, including an anarchist and an English aristocrat. The ending of the film is very different from the ending of the novel.

== Plot ==
Not long after she celebrates her 80th birthday, the sophisticated and still attractive Lady Lendale (widely known as "Lady L") sojourns to her summerhouse with her biographer, Sir Percy, to recount the story of her life.

Fleeing her humble origins in Corsica, Louise travels to Paris, where she finds works in a brothel—as a laundress. There she falls in love with Armand, a thief and somewhat inept anarchist, and she eventually becomes pregnant by him. But before Armand can use a bomb to assassinate a Bavarian prince, she meets the wealthy Lord Lendale, who is so enchanted by the young woman that he offers to help her and Armand escape if she will agree to join with him and present Armand's child to the world as his. Dickie, as she calls him, explains that several of his aristocratic relatives are mad, and he wants new blood in his family.

Lady L becomes a woman of great wealth, moving in high society, and together she and Lord Lendale raise a large family. Many of Lady L's children and grandchildren achieve elite positions in society, in government, in the military and in the Church of England, although she points to a large cohort of "black sheep" at her birthday party.

In the end, however, she reveals her secrets: She and Lord Lendale were never married because he had a deep respect for the institution of marriage. She and Armand were married more than 50 years before, and Armand fathered all their children while posing as the family's chauffeur. Dickie built the summerhouse as a place where they could meet. She has even kept an unexploded bomb on a table there, not knowing how to dispose of it. A horrified Sir Percy declares her biography would be unpublishable. She agrees—The story is "too moral". As an aged Armand bundles them into the limousine, the ancient bomb explodes, blowing the summerhouse to smithereens. Sir Percy collapses in the backseat, and Armand (who drives like an anarchist ) heads off down the road—or portions of it.

The original novel has a grim ending. Lady L describes how she hid Armand in a safe. When asked what happened to him, she opens the door to reveal his skeleton. The movie teases first-time viewers with this possibility when Lady L tells Sir Percy that she hid Armand in the closet in the summer house. She opens the door and laughs as Percy starts. She asks if he expected to find Armand's remains, then reveals the truth.

== Cast ==
- Sophia Loren as Lady Louise Lendale / Lady L
- Paul Newman as Armand Denis
- David Niven as Dicky, Lord Lendale
- Marcel Dalio as Sapper
- Cecil Parker as Sir Percy
- Philippe Noiret as Ambroise Gérôme
- Jacques Dufilho Dufilho as Bealu
- Eugene Deckers as Koenigstein
- Daniel Emilfork as Kobeleff
- Hella Petri as Madam
- Jean Wiener as Krajewski
- Roger Trapp as police inspector Dubaron
- Jean Rupert
- Joe Dassin as a police inspector
- Jacques Legras as a police inspector
- Mario Feliciani as Italian anarchist
- Sacha Pitoëff as Bomb-throwing revolutionary
- Arthur Howard as Butler
- Dorothy Reynolds
- Jacques Ciron
- Hazel Hughes
- Michel Piccoli as Lecoeur
- Claude Dauphin as Inspector Mercier
- Catherine Allégret as Pantoufle
- France Arnel as Brunette
- Dorothée Blank as Blonde girl
- Jean-Paul Cauvin as The Little Orphan
- Lo Ann Chan as the Chinese girl
- Sylvain Levignac
- Laurence Lignières as High society girl
- Tanya Lopert as Agneau
- Moustache as Delcour
- John Wood (uncredited) as the Photographer
- Jenny Orléans as Blonde girl
- Peter Ustinov as Prince Otto of Bavaria
- Janet Wilson as an extra
- Georges Luciano as Fireman extra

== Production ==
MGM spent $2 million on pre-production for the film before cancelling the project.

It was later restarted as an international co-production between France, Italy and the United Kingdom. Castle Howard in Yorkshire was used for the shooting of some scenes. Interiors were shot at the Victorine Studios in Nice.

In a 24 January 1965 article in The New York Times, headlined "At Home with Lady L", Ustinov and the cast discuss various aspects of the production, while filming in France. Ustinov explains that one of reasons for the years-long delay in bringing the story to the screen was the grim ending. "On paper, this scene, the book's climax, has the proper macabre touch", Ustinov says, but it was feared that theater audiences would burst out laughing. After years of debate, Ustinov himself produced the solution: Cut it.

== Release ==
The film had its world premiere at the Empire, Leicester Square in the West End of London on 25 November 1965.

== Reception ==
On Rotten Tomatoes, the film holds a rating of 29% based on 7 contemporary and modern reviews. The New York Times is a notable exception, rating it 4 out of 5 fresh.

In that 19 May 1966 review in The New York Times, Eliot Fremont-Smith called it "a film of great wit, urbane elegance, and fast-paced nuttiness, a charming romantic fantasy shot through with comedy. But it is also a shocking and disturbing film, oddly demented and macabre….” Fremont-Smith lavishes high praise on the "virtuoso" Peter Ustinov in his multiple responsibilities, but finds other cast members to be miscast, with the exception of Niven as Lord Lendale, a role "that combines manliness, sophistication and unselfish charm with terrible suspicions of impotence and gnawing loneliness—and that Mr. Niven performs without a flaw…” Thanks to Ustinov, he says, "The pacing is fast, the wit is sure, the scenes are gorgeous and the use, or control, of color is nothing less than breath-taking.…reasons enough for going to see this imperfect, droll, rewarding and technically very interesting entertainment".
