= Marion Mill Preminger =

Hungarian philanthropist

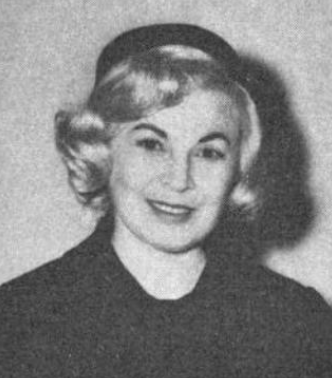
- Marion Mill Preminger from a 1966 publication of the President's Committee on Employment of the Physically Handicapped
- Born: Josa Magda Deutsch; August 3, 1903; Percosova, Hungary
- Died: April 16, 1972 (aged 68); New York City
- Other names: Josa Magda Mueller, Marion Mill Mayer, Marion Hill Preminger
- Occupations: Socialite, philanthropist
- Spouse(s): Otto Preminger; Albert Mayer

Marion Mill Preminger (August 3, 1903 – April 16, 1972), born Josa Magda Deutsch or Magda Deuth, was a Hungarian-born socialite and philanthropist, best known for her work with Albert Schweitzer, and her marriage to director Otto Preminger.

== Early life and education ==
Josa Magda Deutsch was born in Percosova, Hungary (now in Romania). She told many stories of her background, including an aristocratic family, a castle as her birthplace, and a doctorate earned at the University of Vienna or the Sorbonne; but she was considered a "charming fabulist", and her accounts were not always consistent or verifiable.

== Career ==
Mill worked as a model, actress, and nightclub performer in Vienna as a young woman. From 1950 to 1965, Preminger "renounced the glitter and the gloss" of her Hollywood social life and spent several months a year in Africa with Albert Schweitzer, assisting in his work at a hospital in the Congo. She had a collection of African art and artifacts from her travels there. Preminger was decorated by the governments of Gabon and France for her philanthropic work. She toured as a speaker to promote her memoir's publication in 1957.

Preminger's efforts in Africa were sometimes described as well-meaning and generous, but not serious. "Schweitzer openly admires the bigness of her heart," reported the Sunday Mirror in 1963. "Privately, however, he laments her liking for low-cut, figure-hugging dresses."

In the 1960s in the United States, Preminger raised funds for Schweitzer's work and for other philanthropic causes. She served as vice-chair of the President's Committee on Employment of the Handicapped, and supported the committee's work by donating money for contest prizes. She served as honorary Consul-General at the Gabonese embassy in New York. She received an honorary Doctor of Laws degree from Edgecliff College in Ohio in 1970.

== Publications ==
- All I Want is Everything (1957, memoir)
- The Sands of Tamanrasset: The Story of Charles de Foucauld (1961, biography)
- "He Follows in Footsteps of Albert Schweitzer" (1961)

== Personal life and legacy ==
Mill's divorced her first husband, Mueller, to marry director Otto Preminger in Vienna in 1931. They were estranged for much of their marriage and finally divorced in 1949. She hoped to marry Swedish entrepreneur Axel Wenner-Gren in 1946, but their plans fell through. She married architect Albert Mayer as her third husband in 1961. She continued to use Preminger as her surname after her third marriage, despite her ex-husband's protestations. She died from a heart attack at her home on Park Avenue in 1972, probably in her 60s (though the New York Times gave her age at death as 58).

After her death, the Marion Mill Preminger Award and Medallion were named and given in her memory, by the Women's Committee of the President's Committee on Employment of the Handicapped; Gini Laurie was one of the award's first recipients. There is a collection of papers concerning Preminger's work with Schweitzer in the collection of Xavier University Library.
