= White Dog (2022 film) =

2022 Canadian film directed by Anaïs Barbeau-Lavalette

- French: Chien blanc
- Directed by: Anaïs Barbeau-Lavalette
- Written by: Anaïs Barbeau-Lavalette; Valérie Beaugrand-Champagne
- Based on: White Dog (1970 novel) by Romain Gary
- Produced by: Nicole Robert
- Starring: Kacey Rohl; Denis Ménochet; K. C. Collins
- Cinematography: Jonathan Decoste
- Edited by: Richard Comeau
- Music by: Mathieu Charbonneau
- Production company: Go Films
- Distributed by: MK2 Mile End
- Release date: November 2, 2022 (Cinemania)
- Running time: 96 minutes
- Country: Canada
- Languages: English; French

White Dog (French: Chien blanc) is a 2022 Canadian drama film directed by Anaïs Barbeau-Lavalette. Adapted from Romain Gary's autobiographical novel White Dog, the film stars Denis Ménochet as Gary and Kacey Rohl as his wife Jean Seberg, and centres on their adoption of an abandoned dog whom they learn to their horror had been trained to attack Black people on sight, leading them to send him to Keys (K. C. Collins), a Black dog trainer, for retraining.

It is the second film adaptation of Gary's book, following the 1982 American film. Unlike the first film adaptation, in which director Samuel Fuller entirely wrote out the character of Gary, replaced Seberg with a younger fictional actress and recast the story as a horror film centred on the dog itself, Barbeau-Lavalette remained more faithful to the original book. Additionally, given the context of a film centred on the responses of white characters to anti-Black racism based on a decades-old book, she hired Black filmmakers Maryse Legagneur and Will Prosper as script consultants to ensure that the screenplay was respectful and sensitive to Black perspectives.

The film premiered on November 2, 2022, as the opening film of the Cinemania film festival, and opened in commercial release on November 9.
