= Erik Lee Preminger =

American writer and actor

- Born: Eric Lee Kirkland; 1944 (age 81–82)} New York City, US
- Other name: Erik de Diego
- Occupations: Writer; actor; producer
- Years active: 1968–present
- Spouse: Barbara van Nattem (divorced)
- Children: 1
- Parents: Otto Preminger (father); Gypsy Rose Lee (mother)
- Relatives: June Havoc (aunt)

Erik Lee Preminger (born 1944) is an American writer, actor, and producer.

== Early life ==
Preminger's birth name was Eric Lee Kirkland. His true paternity was not known to him until he was an adult. He was named by his mother Gypsy Rose Lee and her then-husband, Alexander Kirkland. His father was film director Otto Preminger. He was the only nephew of actress June Havoc, Gypsy Rose Lee's younger sister.

== Career ==
In 1962, after less than a year at Columbia University, he joined the Army. In 1967, in Germany, while in the Army, he met with Otto Preminger, who was in France.

In January 2020, he presented a 45-minute multimedia documentary presentation, from Gypsy Rose Lee's 17 volumes of scrapbooks, 16-millimeter films, newsreels, home movies, and television shows, followed by an open-ended Q&A session.

== Personal life ==
He wrote an autobiography about his relationship with his mother: Gypsy & Me: At Home and on the Road with Gypsy Rose Lee (Little, Brown - 1984, ISBN 0-89621-634-9) which was later re-issued as My G-String Mother: At Home and Backstage With Gypsy Rose Lee (ISBN 1-58394-096-0).

In 1967, he married flight attendant Barbara van Nattem, but the marriage ended in divorce. In 1971, he was married to his second wife, Brigid Guinan, moved to San Francisco, and his son was 3 years old.

== Filmography ==
Year	Title	Role	Notes
1972	The Heartbreak Kid	Pecan Pie Waiter	Also associate producer
1975	Rosebud	Ken	Also writer
