= Dimitra Arliss =

American actress (1932–2012)

- Born: October 23, 1932; Lorain, Ohio, U.S.
- Died: January 26, 2012 (aged 79); Woodland Hills, California, U.S.
- Other name: Dimitra Arlys
- Occupation: Actress
- Years active: 1954–2000

Dimitra Arliss (October 23, 1932 – January 26, 2012) was an American actress.

== Early life and education ==
Arliss was born in Lorain, Ohio, on October 23, 1932, of Greek descent. She attended Miami University.

== Career ==
Arliss's acting career began at the Goodman Theatre in Chicago. She gained attention in Arthur L. Kopit's Broadway play Indians (1970), playing Teskanjavila. She also appeared on Broadway as Eurydice in Antigone (1971) and as Catherine Petkoff in Arms and the Man (1985).

Her films included The Sting (1973), in which she portrayed the contract killer Loretta Salino, Xanadu, Firefox, and Bless the Child. Her acting on television included Bella Mia and Rich Man, Poor Man and episodes of Dallas and Quincy, M. E.

=== Voice-over work ===
She voiced Anastasia Hardy in the Spider-Man: The Animated Series episodes "The Sins Of The Fathers, Chapter II: Make A Wish" (1995) and "The Sins Of The Fathers, Chapter IV: Enter The Green Goblin" (1996).

== Death ==
Arliss died on January 26, 2012, at the Motion Picture & Television Fund Hospital in Woodland Hills, California, at age 79, from complications of a stroke, and was buried at the Forest Lawn, Hollywood Hills Cemetery in Los Angeles.

== Filmography ==
=== Film ===
Year	Title	Role	Notes
1971	The Ski Bum	Liz Stone	
1973	The Sting	Loretta Salino	
1977	The Other Side of Midnight	Sister Theresa	
1979	A Perfect Couple	Athena	
1980	Xanadu	Helen	
1982	Firefox	Dr. Natalia Baranovich	
1985	Eleni	Ana (Czechoslovakia)	
1996	It's My Party	Fanny Kondos	
2000	Bless the Child	Dahnya	

=== Television ===
Year	Title	Role	Notes
1974	Lucas Tanner	Mr. Hailey	Episode: "Echoes"
1974	This Is the West That Was	Ida May	Television film
1974	Kojak	Sherry Kaufman	Episode: "A Killing in the Second House"
1975	Mannix	Rosa	2 episodes
1975	Death Scream	Mrs. Kosinsky	Television film
1975	Joe and Sons	Flora	Episode: "Carmela"
1975	The Art of Crime	Madame Vera	Television film
1975	Marcus Welby, M.D.	Margot Porter	Episode: "The One Face in the World"
1976	Special Treat	Lily	Episode: "Papa and Me"
1976	Rich Man, Poor Man Book II	Maria Falconetti	7 episodes
1976–1979	Quincy, M.E.	Dr. Kershner / Shirley	3 episodes
1977	The Hardy Boys/Nancy Drew Mysteries	Hazel Thompson	Episode: "The Mystery of Witches' Hollow"
1977	Mary Hartman, Mary Hartman	Zorinna	8 episodes
1978	The Pirate	Nabilia	Television film
1979	Dallas	Hatton	Episode: "John Ewing III: Part 2"
1979	The Fall of the House of Usher	Madeline Usher	Television film
1980	Guyana Tragedy: The Story of Jim Jones	Sister Fleming	Television film
1981	Murder in Texas	Gina Meier	Television film
1983	Bring 'Em Back Alive	Princess Kati	Episode: "To Kill a Princess"
1987	As the World Turns	Greek Woman	Episode: "Lily Learns a Shattering Truth"
1988	Onassis: The Richest Man in the World	Artemis	Television film
1993	The Disappearance of Christina	Gallery Owne	Television film
1994	Iron Man	Computer / Armor Computer / Mrs. Stark	2 episodes
1996	General Hospital	Helena Cassadine	2 episodes
1996	Spider-Man	Anastasia Hardy	2 episodes
1997	Bella Mafia	Mrs. Scorpio, Teresa's mother	Television film
