= Rosebud (1975 film) =

- Directed by: Otto Preminger
- Written by: Erik Lee Preminger
- Produced by: Otto Preminger
- Starring: Peter O'Toole; Richard Attenborough; Cliff Gorman; Claude Dauphin; John V. Lindsay; Peter Lawford; Raf Vallone; Isabelle Huppert; Kim Cattrall
- Cinematography: Denys N. Coop
- Music by: Laurent Petitgirard
- Distributed by: United Artists
- Release date: March 24, 1975
- Running time: 126 minutes
- Country: United States
- Language: English

Rosebud is a 1975 American action thriller film directed by Otto Preminger, and starring Peter O'Toole, Richard Attenborough, and Peter Lawford. The script was by Otto's son, Erik Lee Preminger, based on the 1974 novel of the same title by Joan Hemingway and Paul Bonnecarrère.

== Plot ==
Larry Martin is a Newsweek reporter, secretly working for the CIA as he travels around the globe tasked, along with Israeli intelligence, to work for the release of five wealthy girls kidnapped by the anti-Israel terrorist Palestinian Liberation Army from the yacht Rosebud. Martin must contend with the girls' fathers, all of whom are wealthy, connected and concerned. Sloat, the extremist head of Black September, is connected with the kidnappings, and is subsequently hunted down after his plans for a centralized global terrorist network are uncovered.

== Cast ==
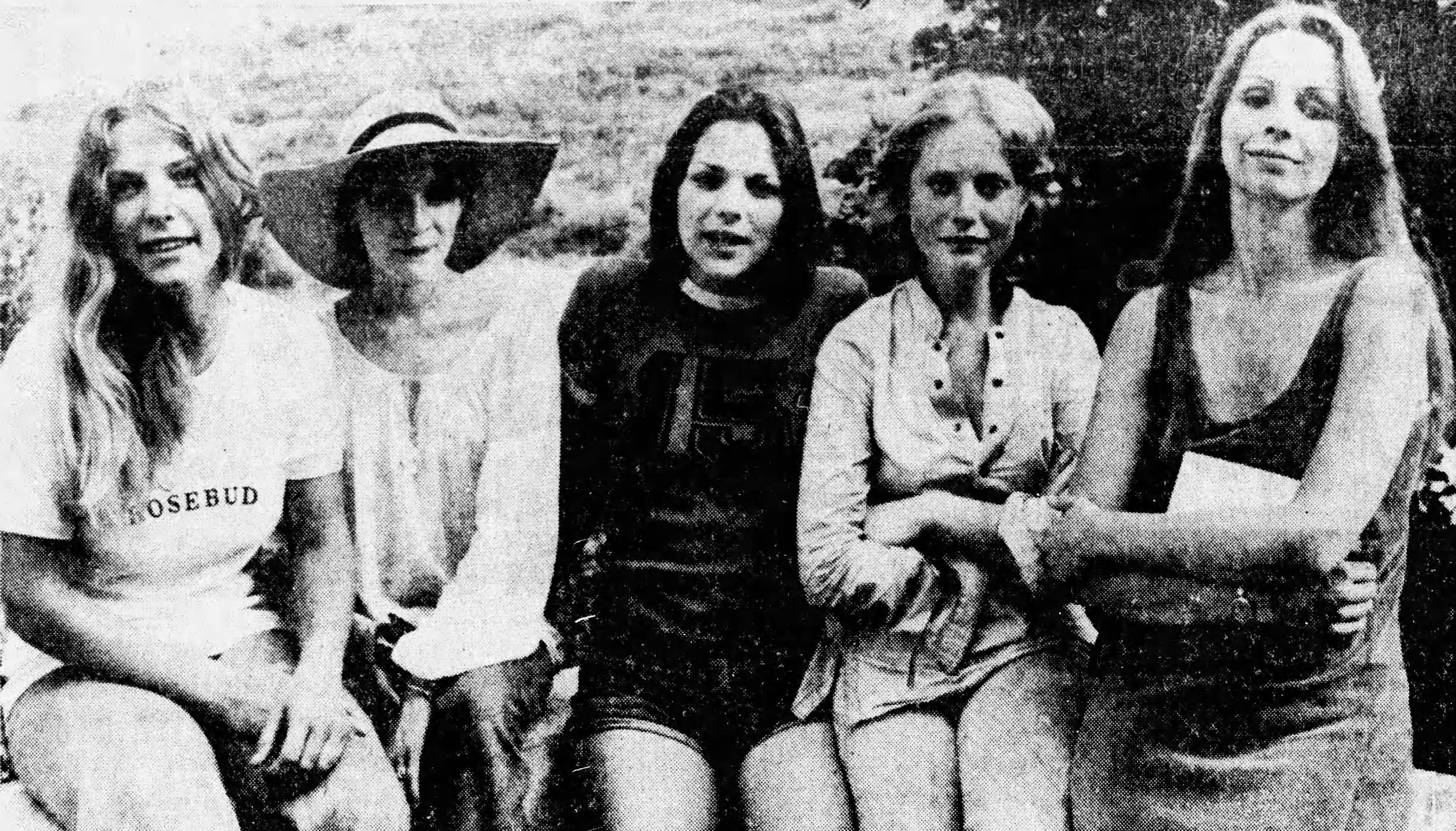
Actors who played kidnap victims in a promotional image for the film. left to right: Debra Berger, Brigitte Ariel, Kim Cattrall, Isabelle Huppert and Lalla Ward.

- Peter O'Toole as Larry Martin
- Richard Attenborough as Edward Sloat
- Cliff Gorman as Yafet Hemlekh
- Claude Dauphin as Charles-André Fargeau
- John Lindsay as Sen. Donnovan
- Peter Lawford as Lord Carter
- Raf Vallone as George Nikolaos
- Adrienne Corri as Lady Carter
- Isabelle Huppert as Helene Nikolaos
- Brigitte Ariel as Sabine Fargeau
- Lalla Ward as Margaret Carter
- Kim Cattrall as Joyce Donnovan
- Debra Berger as Gertrud Freyer
- Mark Burns as Shute
- Amidou as Kirkbane
- Klaus Löwitsch as Schloss
- Yosef Shiloach as Hacam
- Françoise Brion as Melina Nikolaos
- Maria Machado as Else
- Serge Marquand
- Jean Martin

Actress Barbara Emerson, who had been cast as one of the girls, was replaced during production.

== Production ==
Originally the film was set to star Robert Mitchum, but he left after disagreements with Preminger. Kim Cattrall made her film debut as a teenager.

== Critical Response ==
The film was described as "one of the biggest bombs in movie history" by author Theodore Gershuny, who published the book "Soon To Be A Major Motion Picture" about the making of the film.

Reviewer Vincent Canby described the film as "pure camp" and "a suspense melodrama of such ineptitude, lethargy and loose ends that only someone with his arm being twisted would take credit for it."

== See also ==
- List of American films of 1975
- Isabelle Huppert on screen and stage
