= The Ski Bum =

1965 novel by Romain Gary

- First edition
- Author: Romain Gary
- Language: English
- Publisher: Harper & Row
- Publication date: 1965
- Publication place: France
- Media type: Print (Hardback & Paperback)

The Ski Bum is a novel by Lithuanian-French author Romain Gary published in 1965. The French translation was published four years later under the title Adieu Gary Cooper. The novel tells the story of Lenni, a 21-year-old boy escaping from America, his country of birth, to pursue his dreams in the Alpine mountains of Switzerland. The story is about how he faces his obstacles with his logic.

A film adaptation was released in 1971, starring Zalman King and Charlotte Rampling.
