= White Dog (Gary novel) =

Novel by Romain Gary

- Cover of first edition, French release
- Author: Romain Gary
- Original title: Chien Blanc
- Translator: Romain Gary
- Language: French, English
- Publisher: Éditions Gallimard (French); New American Library (English)
- Publication date: 1970
- Publication place: France, United States
- Media type: Print
- Pages: 279 (English); 256 (French)
- ISBN: 2-07-027022-X (French)
- OCLC: 257395259

White Dog, released in France as Chien Blanc, is a non-fiction autobiographical novel written by Romain Gary. Originally published as a short story in Life in 1970 (9 October), the full novel was published in 1970 in French in France by Éditions Gallimard. Gary's English version of the novel was published in North America in the same year by New American Library. The novel provides a fictionalized account of Gary and his wife's experiences in the 1960s with a stray Alabama police dog trained to attack black people on sight, and their attempts to have the dog reprogrammed.

Gary uses the novel as a vehicle to denounce both racism and the activists supporting African-American rights, including his own ex-wife Jean Seberg and Marlon Brando. He also examines whether human responses to situations, including racism, are learned social behavior and whether they can be unlearned. In 1981, it was adapted into the controversial film of the same name, in which director Samuel Fuller made various changes to the novel's story to focus more on the dog and present a more pessimistic ending than the original novel. The film's American release after negative press from the National Association for the Advancement of Colored People (NAACP) led to concerns of boycotts. Anaïs Barbeau-Lavalette released a more faithful adaptation of the book in 2022.

== Plot synopsis ==
A fictionalized memoir set in both the United States and France during the 1960s American civil rights movement, White Dog focuses on the events that occur after Gary and his then-wife Jean Seberg, an actress and an activist, adopt a handsome and clearly well-trained German Shepherd dog who comes back to their home with one of their other dogs. At first, the dog, which they name Batka, is an ideal new member of the family: intelligent, devoted, and quickly befriending the couple's assortment of other animals. To their dismay, they discover that the dog, a former Alabama police dog, was trained to attack black people on sight. Although they are told the dog is too old to be retrained, they take him to a black dog trainer to try. Instead, the man trains the dog to attack white people, including Gary himself. Gary states that he changed the ending of the American version to be more optimistic.

== Publication history ==
White Dog was first released as an English short story that appeared in Life magazine in 1970. It was published as a full novel in 1970 in two languages and two countries. A French-language version was published in France under the title Chien Blanc by Éditions Gallimard (ISBN 207027022X) in April 1970. Gary, who was multi-lingual, also wrote an English version, which was published by New American Library in 1970 under its Signet label.

French

- 1970, France, Éditions Gallimard (ISBN 207027022X), 256 pages, paperback
- 1972, France, Éditions Gallimard (ISBN 2070360504), 220 pages, paperback

English

- 1970, United States, New American Library, 279 pages, paperback
- 2004, United States, University of Chicago Press (ISBN 0226284301), 290 pages, paperback

== Themes ==
With the use of a "flippant tone and [an] uncomfortable use of sarcasm," White Dog is Gary's dissection of the paranoia generated by both racism and classism as he juxtaposes McCarthyism-American, in which there is an "obsessive sniffing out of 'subversives' and violent race riots," against the barricades and riots of France in 1968. The violence depicted also provides a discourse on revolutionary social change, as it also leads to "a new order, a new reality." Gary "excoriates American racism, black activism, and movie-colony liberalism" and reflects on American race relations as a whole. He also documents his own "intolerance of intolerance that is the curse of tolerance". Through the dog, Gary examines whether a learned response can be unlearned. He also poses the question of how much freedom and uniqueness a person can claim if humans responses are indeed learned by "social indoctrination."

Within the novel, Gary makes "scathing attacks on self-aggrandising Jewish pro-black sentiment and self-serving celebrity campaigners", while making explicit attacks against Marlon Brando and Seberg for their involvement in civil rights movements and the latter's involvement with the Black Panthers organization. In an interview about the novel, Gary states that as a "typical American idealist" he was an easy mark for people seeking money for causes, and he depicts this in the novel by having his frequently appearing in activist events writing checks. After his death, the novel was called the "story of his crusade".

== Reception ==
White Dog quickly became a bestseller in the United States after its English release. Phoebe Adams of The Atlantic felt the story was ironic, and noted that it was "presumably" true. She felt the depiction of Marlon Brando was "tartly funny" and that story as a whole served "as an excuse for Mr. Gary's comments on racial affairs in this country, a matter on which is somewhat less pessimistic than the natives and a good deal more sensible." The Globe and Mail's H. J. Kirchhoff considered it a "riveting, thoughtful work" that serves as a metaphor for American racism. Julien Roumette felt Romain's depiction of the racial tensions in America at the time was "meticulously reconstituted, with a realistic, even documentary, rather exceptional dimension." Julia Weldon of Harper's Magazine remarked with amusement that the events of the novel were ones that "only a Frenchman" could have found himself in. She felt the novel was a "decathlon event" in which Gary turned a "household crisis into a full-scale allegory." Overall, she praised the book as a "memorable portrait of guilt and largess in black and white", noting she felt Gary had lived to "witness his own maturity" though she also wondered if he stretched the truth to "make himself a legend in his own time."

== Film adaptations ==
Paramount Pictures purchased the film rights for White Dog in 1975, though the film itself was not produced until 1981, after Gary's suicide. Various changes were made from the original novel's story, including the removal of Gary himself and a tighter focus on the dog. Gary's wife was replaced in the script with a young, unmarried actress as Paramount wanted the film to show a strong contrast between the loving relationship between the protagonist and the dog's random attacks. The novel's hate-filled Muslim black trainer was converted into the character named Keys, who genuinely wished to cure the animal. The novel's original ending was also changed to make it more pessimistic. Directed by Samuel Fuller and starring Paul Winfield and Kristy McNichol, the film's theatrical release was suppressed in the United States out of concern of negative press after rumors began circulating from the NAACP that the film was racist. It was released internationally in France and the United Kingdom in 1982, and broadcast on various American cable television channels. Its first official American release came in December 2008 when The Criterion Collection released the original uncut film to DVD.

In reflecting on the film, Fuller notes that he had known Gary before being offered the chance to direct the White Dog adaptation, and greatly admired both Gary and the novel. He wanted to have the film dedicated to Gary, who had committed suicide before the film was completed, but the studio declined. In an interview with the Los Angeles Times, he stated "I know [Gary would] have liked it. And he'd have been pleased because his other books (The Roots of Heaven, etc) had not done well as films."

In 2022, Canadian film director Anaïs Barbeau-Lavalette released the new film adaptation White Dog (Chien blanc), which remained more faithful to the original book.
