= Otto Preminger =

Austrian-American director, producer, and actor (1905–1986)

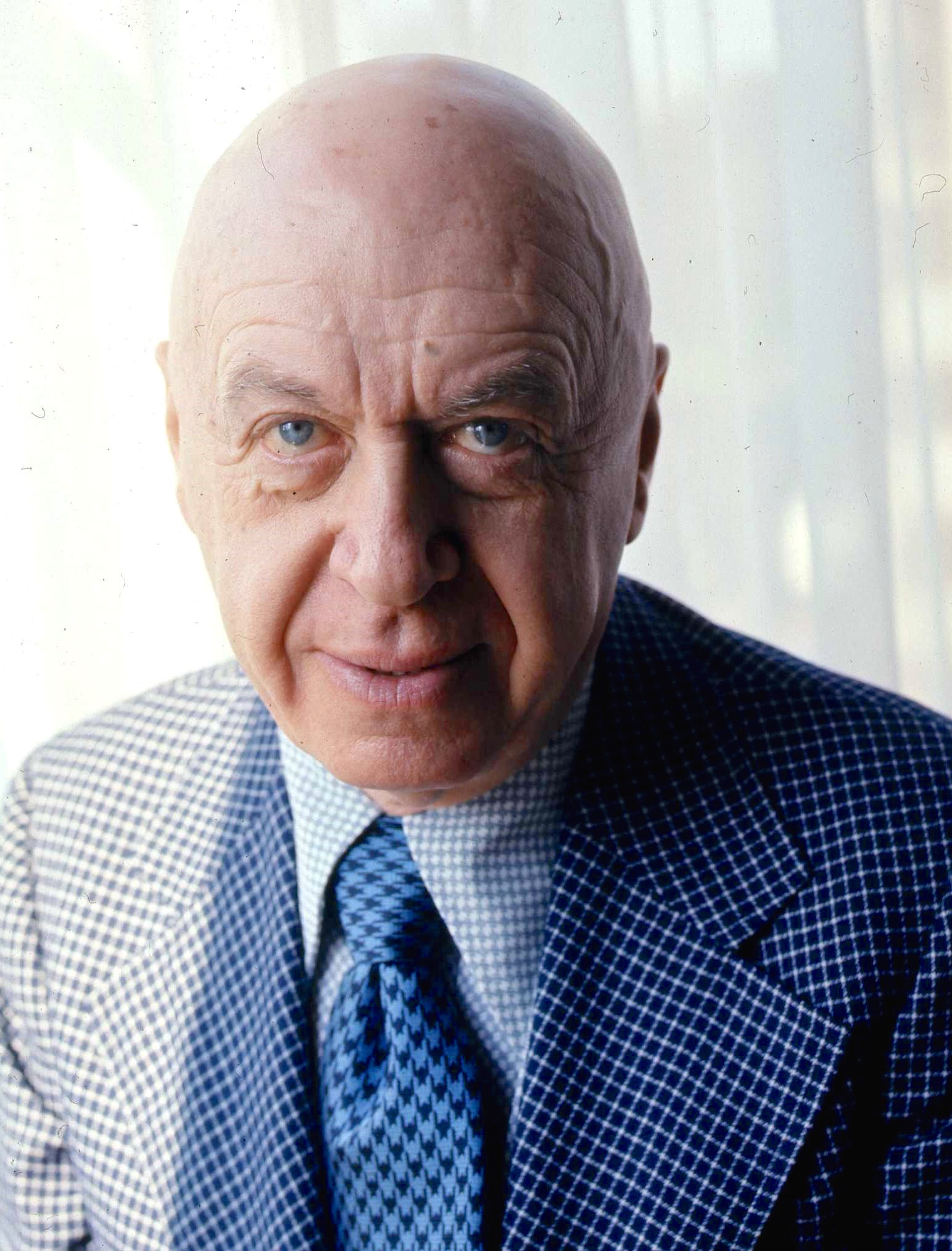
- Preminger in 1976, photographed by Allan Warren
- Born: Otto Ludwig Preminger; 5 December 1905; Wischnitz, Duchy of Bukovina, Austria-Hungary (present-day Vyzhnytsia, Chernivtsi Oblast, Ukraine)
- Died: 23 April 1986 (aged 80); New York City, U.S.
- Education: University of Vienna
- Occupations: Director; producer; actor
- Years active: 1924–1979
- Spouses: Marion Mill (m. 1932; div. 1949); Mary Gardner (m. 1951; div. 1960); Hope Bryce (m. 1971)
- Children: 3, including Erik
- Relatives: Ingo Preminger (brother)

Otto Ludwig Preminger (/ˈprɛmɪndʒər/ PREM-in-jər; German: [ˈɔtoː ˈpreːmɪŋɐ]; 5 December 1905 – 23 April 1986) was an Austrian-American film and theatre director, film producer and actor. He directed more than 35 feature films in a five-decade career after leaving the theatre, and was one of the most influential directors in Hollywood during the 1940s and 1950s. He was nominated for three Academy Awards, twice for Best Director and once for Best Picture, among many other accolades.

After achieving theatrical prominence in Vienna, Preminger emigrated to the United States in the mid-1930s, working as a director for 20th Century Fox. He first gained attention for film noir mysteries such as Laura (1944) and Fallen Angel (1945), while in the 1950s and 1960s, he directed high-profile adaptations of popular novels and stage works. Several of these later films pushed the boundaries of censorship by dealing with themes which were then taboo in Hollywood, such as premarital sexuality (The Moon Is Blue, 1953), drug addiction (The Man with the Golden Arm, 1955), rape (Anatomy of a Murder, 1959) and homosexuality (Advise & Consent, 1962). He also had several acting roles, most famously as a Nazi POW camp commandant in Stalag 17.

Preminger was also notorious for his temperamental and perfectionist attitude on-set, which led to rows with several actors and earned him the nicknames "Otto the Monster" and "Otto the Ogre". Turner Classic Movies wrote that Preminger "enjoyed a long reign in Hollywood as the quintessence of the dictatorial European auteur".

== Early life ==
Preminger was born in 1905 in Wischnitz, Bukovina, Austria-Hungary (present-day Vyzhnytsia, Ukraine), into a Jewish family. His parents were Josefa (née Fraenkel) and Markus Preminger. The couple provided a stable home life for Otto and his younger brother Ingwald, known as "Ingo", later the producer of the original film version of M*A*S*H (1970).

After the assassination in 1914 of Archduke Franz Ferdinand, which led to the Great War, Russia entered the war on the Serbian side. Bukovina was invaded by the Russian Army and the Preminger family fled. His father secured a position as public prosecutor in Graz, capital of Styria. When the Preminger family relocated, Otto was nearly nine and was enrolled in a school where instruction in Catholicism was mandatory and Jewish history and religion had no place on the syllabus. Ingo, not yet four, remained at home.

After a year in Graz, Markus Preminger claims that he was summoned to Vienna and offered an eminent position (roughly equivalent to that of the United States attorney general), but was told that the position would be his only if he converted to Catholicism, which he refused to do. The next year, he moved his family to Vienna, where Otto later claimed to have been born.

In 1928, Preminger earned a law degree from the University of Vienna.

== Career ==
=== Theater ===
Otto Preminger's first theatrical ambition was to become an actor. In his early teens, he was able to recite from memory many of the great monologues from the international classic repertory, and, never shy, he demanded an audience. Preminger's most successful performance in the National Library rotunda was Mark Antony's funeral oration from Julius Caesar. As he read, watched, and after a fashion began to produce plays, he began to miss more and more classes in school.

When the war came to an end, Markus formed his own law practice. He instilled in both his sons a sense of fair play as well as respect for those with opposing viewpoints. As his father's practice continued to thrive in postwar Vienna, Otto began seriously contemplating a career in the theater. In 1923, when Preminger was 17, his soon-to-be mentor, Max Reinhardt, the renowned Viennese-born director, announced plans to establish a theatrical company in Vienna. Reinhardt's announcement was seen as a call of destiny to Preminger. He began writing to Reinhardt weekly, requesting an audition. After a few months, Preminger, frustrated, gave up, and stopped his daily visit to the post office to check for a response. Unbeknownst to him, a letter was waiting with a date for an audition which Preminger had already missed by two days.

He juggled a commitment to university (attendance of which his parents insisted upon) and to his new position as a Reinhardt apprentice. The two developed a mentor-and-protégé relationship, becoming both a confidant and teacher. When the theater opened, on 1 April 1924, Preminger appeared as a furniture mover in Reinhardt's comedic staging of Carlo Goldoni's The Servant of Two Masters. His next appearance came the next month with William Dieterle (who would later move to Hollywood) in The Merchant of Venice. Other notable alumni with whom Preminger would work the same year were Mady Christians, who died of a stroke after having been blacklisted during the McCarthy era, and Nora Gregor, who was to star in Jean Renoir's La Règle du jeu (1939).

The following summer, a frustrated Preminger was no longer content to occupy the place of a subordinate and he decided to leave the Reinhardt fold. His status as a Reinhardt muse gave him an edge over much of his competition when it came to joining German-speaking theater. His first theater assignments as a director in Aussig were plays ranging from the sexually provocative Wedekind Lulu plays, to the Berlin-tried, melodramatic Sergei Tretyakov play Roar China!.

In 1930, a wealthy industrialist from Graz approached Otto with an offer to direct a film called Die große Liebe (The Great Love). Preminger did not have the same passion for the medium as he had for theater. He accepted the assignment nonetheless. The film premiered at the Emperor Theater in Vienna on 21 December 1931, to strong reviews and business. From 1931 to 1935, he directed twenty-six shows.

On 3 August 1931, he wed a Hungarian woman, Marion Mill. The couple married only thirty minutes after her divorce from her first husband had been finalized.

=== Hollywood ===
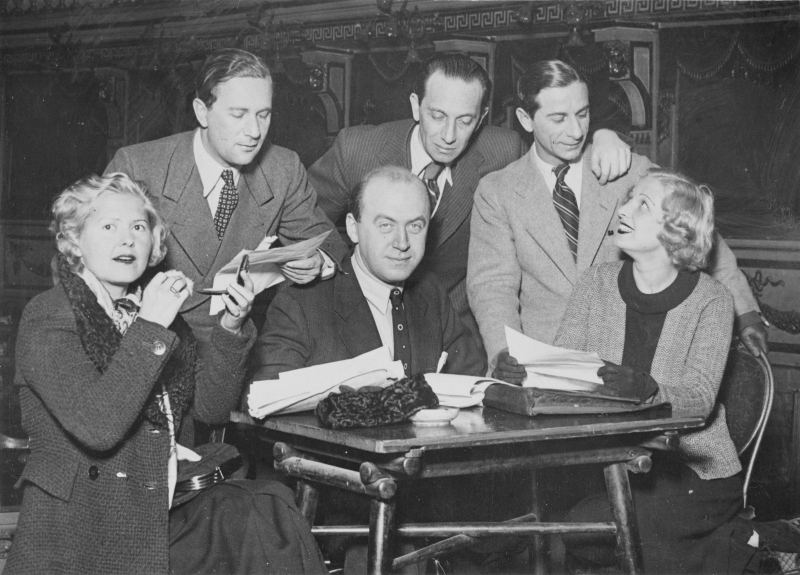
Preminger (sitting) with (left to right) Liane Haid, Oskar Karlweis, Paul Abraham, Tibor Halmay, and Rosy Barsony in 1934

In April 1935, as Preminger was rehearsing a boulevard farce, The King with an Umbrella, he received a summons from American film producer Joseph Schenck to a five o'clock meeting at the Imperial Hotel. Schenck and partner, Darryl F. Zanuck, co-founders of Twentieth Century-Fox, were on the lookout for new talent. Within a half-hour of meeting Schenck, Preminger accepted an invitation to work for Fox in Los Angeles.

Preminger's first assignment was to direct a vehicle for Lawrence Tibbett. Preminger worked efficiently, completing the film well within the budget and well before the scheduled shooting deadline. The film opened to tepid notices in November 1936. Zanuck gave Preminger the task of directing another B-picture screwball comedy film Danger – Love at Work. Simone Simon was cast but later fired by Zanuck and replaced with Ann Sothern. The premise was that eight members of an eccentric, wealthy family have inherited their grandfather's land, and the protagonist is a lawyer tasked with persuading the family to hand the land over to a corporation that believes there is oil on the property. One of the female members of the wealthy family provides the romantic interest.

In November 1937, Zanuck's perennial emissary Gregory Ratoff brought Preminger the news that Zanuck had selected him to direct Kidnapped, which was to be the most expensive feature to date for Twentieth Century-Fox. Zanuck himself had adapted the Robert Louis Stevenson novel. After reading Zanuck's script, Preminger knew he was in trouble since he would be a foreign director directing in a foreign setting. During the shooting of Kidnapped, while screening footage of the film with Zanuck, the studio head accused Preminger of making changes in a scene; in particular, one with child actor Freddie Bartholomew and a dog. Preminger, composed at first, explained, claiming he shot the scene exactly as written.

Zanuck insisted that he knew his own script. The confrontation escalated and ended with Preminger exiting the office and slamming the door. Days later, the lock to Preminger's office was changed, and his name was removed from the door. Later, a representative of Zanuck offered Preminger a buyout deal which he rejected: Preminger wanted to be paid for the remaining eleven months of his two-year contract. He searched for work at other studios, but received no offers—only two years after his arrival in Hollywood, he was unemployed in the film industry. He returned to New York, and began to re-focus on the stage. Success came quickly on Broadway for Preminger, with long-running productions, including Outward Bound with Laurette Taylor and Vincent Price, My Dear Children with John and Elaine Barrymore and Margin for Error, in which Preminger played a shiny-domed villainous Nazi. Preminger was offered a teaching position at the Yale School of Drama and began commuting twice a week to Connecticut to lecture on directing and acting.

20th Century Fox purchased the screen rights of Margin for Error for approximately $25,000 in the spring of 1941, and William Goetz, who was running Fox in Zanuck's absence, was soon impressed with Preminger and offered him a new seven-year contract calling on his services as both a director and actor. Preminger took full measure of the temporary studio czar, and accepted. He completed production on schedule, although with a slightly increased budget, by November 1942. Critics were dismissive upon the film's release the following February, noting the bad timing of the release, coinciding with the war. Before his next assignment with Fox, Preminger was asked by movie mogul Samuel Goldwyn to appear as a Nazi once more, this time in a Bob Hope comedy, They Got Me Covered.

Preminger hoped to find possible properties he could develop before Zanuck's return, one of which was Vera Caspary's suspense novel Laura. Before production would begin on Laura, Preminger was given the green light to produce and direct Army Wives, another B-picture morale booster for a country at war. Its focus was on showing the sacrifices made by women as they send their husbands off to the front.

=== Laura ===
Zanuck returned from the armed services with his grudge against Preminger intact. Preminger was not granted permission to direct Laura, only to serve as producer. Rouben Mamoulian was selected to direct. Mamoulian began ignoring Preminger and started to rewrite the script. Although Preminger had no complaints about the casting of the relatively unknown Gene Tierney and Dana Andrews, he balked at their choice for the film's villain, Waldo, actor Laird Cregar. Preminger explained to Zanuck that audiences would immediately identify Cregar as a villain, especially after Cregar's role as Jack the Ripper in The Lodger.

Preminger wanted stage actor Clifton Webb to play Waldo and persuaded his boss to give Webb a screen test. Webb was cast and Mamoulian was fired for creative differences, which also included Preminger wanting Dana Andrews to be a more classy detective instead of a gumshoe detective. Laura started filming on 27 April 1944, with a projected budget of $849,000. After Preminger took over, the film continued shooting well into late June. When released, the film was an instant hit with audiences and critics alike, earning Preminger his first Academy Award nomination for direction.

=== Peak years ===
Preminger expected acclaim for Laura would promote him to work on better pictures, but his professional fate was in the hands of Zanuck, who had Preminger take over for the ailing Ernst Lubitsch on A Royal Scandal, a remake of Lubitsch's own silent Forbidden Paradise (1924), starring Pola Negri as Catherine the Great. Before he suffered a heart attack, Lubitsch had spent months in preparation, and had already cast the film. Preminger cast Tallulah Bankhead, whom he had known since 1938 when he was directing on Broadway.

Bankhead learned that Preminger's family would be barred from immigrating to the U.S. due to immigration quotas, and she asked her father (who was Speaker of the House) to intervene to save them from the Nazis. He did, which earned Bankhead Preminger's loyalty. Thus when Lubitsch wanted to make the film into a vehicle for Greta Garbo, Preminger, although he would have been eager to direct the film that brought Garbo out of retirement, refused to betray Bankhead. They became good friends and got along well during filming. The film received generally lackluster reviews as the Ruritanian romance genre had become outdated, and it failed to earn back its cost of production.

Fallen Angel (1945) was exactly what Preminger had been anticipating. In Fallen Angel, a con man and womanizer ends up by chance in a small California town, where he romances a sultry waitress and a well-to-do spinster. When the waitress is found killed, the drifter, played by Dana Andrews, becomes the prime suspect. Linda Darnell played the doomed waitress. Centennial Summer (1946), Preminger's next film, would be his first shot entirely in color. The reviews and box office draw were tepid when the film was released in July 1946, but by the end of that year Preminger had one of the most sumptuous contracts on the lot, earning $7,500 a week.

Forever Amber, based on Kathleen Winsor's internationally popular novel Forever Amber, published in 1944, was Zanuck's next investment in adaptation. Preminger had read the book and disliked it immensely. Preminger had another bestseller aimed at a female audience in mind, Daisy Kenyon. Zanuck pledged that if Preminger did Forever Amber first, he could make Daisy Kenyon afterwards. Forever Amber had already been shooting for nearly six weeks when Preminger replaced director John Stahl. Zanuck had already spent nearly $2 million on the production.

Only after turning to his revised script did Preminger learn Zanuck had recast star Peggy Cummins with Linda Darnell. Zanuck was convinced that whoever played Amber would become a big star, and he wanted that woman to be one of the studio's own. Zanuck had bought the book because he believed its scandalous reputation promised big box-office returns, and he was not surprised when the Catholic Legion of Decency condemned the film for glamorizing a promiscuous heroine who has a child out of wedlock; they successfully lobbied 20th Century Fox to make changes to the film. Forever Amber opened to big business in October 1947 and garnered decent reviews. Preminger called the film "the most expensive picture I ever made and it was also the worst".

Preminger maintained a busy schedule, working with writers on scripts for two planned projects, Daisy Kenyon (1947) and The Dark Wood; the latter was not produced. Joan Crawford starred in Daisy Kenyon alongside Dana Andrews, Ruth Warrick and Henry Fonda. Variety proclaimed the film "high powered melodrama surefire for the femme market". After the modest success of Daisy Kenyon, Preminger saw That Lady in Ermine as a further opportunity. Betty Grable was cast opposite Douglas Fairbanks Jr. The film had previously been another Lubitsch project, but after Lubitsch's sudden death in November 1947, Preminger took over. His next film was a period piece based on Lady Windermere's Fan. Over the spring and early summer of 1948 Preminger turned Oscar Wilde's play into The Fan (1949), which starred Madeleine Carroll; the film opened to poor notices.

=== Challenging taboos and censorship ===
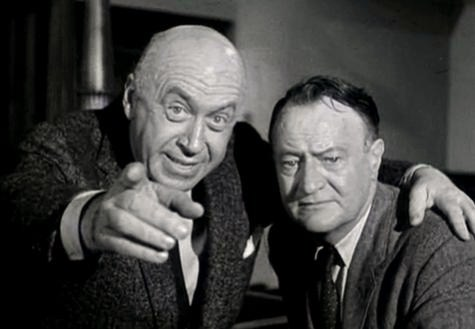
Preminger and author John D. Voelker in the trailer for Anatomy of a Murder

Several of his films in this period dealt with controversial and taboo themes, thereby challenging both the Motion Picture Association of America's Production Code of censorship and the Hollywood blacklist. The Catholic Legion of Decency condemned the comedy The Moon Is Blue (1953) on the grounds of moral standards. The film was based on a Broadway play which had inspired mass protests for its use of the words "virgin" and "pregnant". Refusing to remove the offending words, Preminger had the film released without the Production Code Seal of Approval. Based on the novel by Nelson Algren, The Man with the Golden Arm (1955) was one of the first Hollywood films to deal with heroin addiction.

Later, Anatomy of a Murder (1959), with its frank courtroom discussions of rape and sexual intercourse led to the censors objecting to the use of words such as "rape", "sperm", "sexual climax" and "penetration". Preminger made but one concession (substituting "violation" for "penetration") and the picture was released with MPAA approval, marking the beginning of the end of the Production Code. With Exodus (1960) Preminger struck a first major blow against the Hollywood blacklist by acknowledging banned screenwriter Dalton Trumbo. The film is an adaptation of the Leon Uris bestseller about the founding of the state of Israel. Preminger also acted in a few movies including the World War II Luft-Stalag Commandant, Oberst von Scherbach of the German POW camp Stalag 17 (1953), directed by Billy Wilder.

From the mid-1950s, most of Preminger's films used animated titles designed by Saul Bass, and many had jazz scores. At the New York City Opera, in October 1953, Preminger directed the American premiere (in English translation) of Gottfried von Einem's opera Der Prozeß, based on Franz Kafka's novel The Trial. Soprano Phyllis Curtin headed the cast. Preminger also adapted two operas for the screen during the decade. Carmen Jones (1954) is a reworking of the Bizet opera Carmen to a wartime African-American setting while Porgy and Bess (1959) is based on the George Gershwin opera. In 1960 Preminger produced the play, Critic's Choice, written by Ira Levin and starring Henry Fonda. Ida Martucci, author of the book, Jive Jungle, was the production assistant. It opened on Broadway at the Ethel Barrymore Theatre on December 14, 1960, and closed on May 27, 1961. His two films of the early 1960s were Advise & Consent (1962), a political drama from the Allen Drury bestseller with a homosexual subtheme, and The Cardinal (1963), a drama set in the Vatican hierarchy for which Preminger received his second Best Director Academy Award nomination.

=== Later career ===
Beginning in 1965, Preminger made a string of films in which he attempted to make stories that were fresh and distinctive, but the films he made, including In Harm's Way (1965) and Tell Me That You Love Me, Junie Moon (1970), became both critical and financial flops. One exception was Such Good Friends (1971), which earned a Golden Globe nomination for its star Dyan Cannon.

Preminger made a guest appearance as "Mr. Freeze" on the Batman television series, succeeding George Sanders and preceding Eli Wallach in the role of the supervillain.

Preminger's Hurry Sundown (1967) is a lengthy drama set in the U.S. South and was partly intended to break cinematic racial and sexual taboos. However, the film was poorly received and ridiculed for a heavy-handed approach, and for the dubious casting of Michael Caine as an American Southerner. It was followed by several other films which were critical and commercial failures, including Skidoo (1968), a failed attempt at a hip sixties comedy (and Groucho Marx's last film), and Rosebud (1975), a terrorism thriller which was also widely ridiculed. Several publicized disputes with leading actors did further damage to Preminger's reputation. His last film, an adaptation of the Graham Greene espionage novel The Human Factor (1979), had financial problems and was barely released.

== Directing style and personality ==
As noted above, both as a director and (later in his career) as the producer of his own films, Preminger repeatedly broke new ground, by challenging long-established norms and taboos in Hollywood films. He was also known for his efficiency as a filmmaker—for most of his career he routinely completed his films on time and on budget. He frequently favoured long takes, often filmed dialogue in two-shots, rather than intercutting, and preferred minimal cuts. John Ford was also known for similar techniques, filming as few takes as possible, and "cutting in the camera", and it is likely that Preminger preferred these methods for the same reasons as Ford, who had learned from hard experience that shooting as little footage as possible reduced costs, while also minimising the ability of studio executives to recut their films against their wishes.

However, despite his liberal social outlook, Preminger became notorious for his domineering and abrasive personality, his explosive temper, and his dictatorial manner on set, which earned him nicknames like "Otto the Terrible" and "Otto the Ogre"—although it has been speculated that (like his contemporary John Ford) Preminger's tyrannical persona and abusive behaviour were to some extent a calculated pose, intended to garner publicity, keep his cast and crew under his control, and keep interfering studio executives at bay.

Preminger evidently had relatively few conflicts with the major stars with whom he worked, although there were notable exceptions. Lana Turner (originally cast in the role that subsequently went to Lee Remick) quit Anatomy of a Murder a month before filming was due to start, over a dispute about her wardrobe, with Turner telling the press that she couldn't deal with Preminger's domineering personality, and renowned British actor Paul Scofield reportedly quit Saint Joan after he got into a heated argument with Preminger during the first cast read-through of the script.

Laurence Olivier, who played a police inspector in the psychological thriller Bunny Lake Is Missing (1965), shot in England, recalled in his autobiography Confessions of an Actor that he found Preminger a "bully". Adam West, who portrayed the lead in the 1960s Batman television series, echoed Olivier's opinion. He remembered Preminger as being rude and unpleasant, especially when he disregarded the typical thespian etiquette of subtly cooperating when being helped to his feet, in a scene by West and Burt Ward.

Preminger became notorious for his abusive and bullying behaviour towards his crews, and he was especially intolerant of less experienced actors—he reputedly completely memorised every line of each script before shooting began, and would fly into a rage at any actor who struggled to remember their lines. He is said to have grabbed one nervous young actor by the shoulders and screamed in his face "Relax! Relax!" Composer Elmer Bernstein, who scored The Man with the Golden Arm recalled, "He was a scary character. I thought he was going to throw me out of the office when I told him that what I had in mind was to do a jazz-based score. But he said that that was what I had been hired for, and that was what I should go away and do."

Linda Darnell was another famous target of Preminger's temper—he reportedly screamed at her almost every day for two months during the filming of Forever Amber. She came to loathe him, and the combination of the long hours of filming, heavy dieting and Preminger's constant harangues caused Darnell to collapse twice on set, and she was ordered to take ten days off by a doctor. During rehearsals for the Herman Wouk play Modern Primitive, Preminger screamed so violently at an actor who struggled to remember his lines that the man allegedly suffered a nervous breakdown, and one witness later commented, "I had never seen such terrifying rage in anyone," describing the director as having "veins standing out on his forehead" and "literally foaming at the mouth".

One of the most infamous examples of his mistreatment of inexperienced actors was Jean Seberg, whom he plucked from obscurity and directed in Saint Joan and Bonjour Tristesse. Seberg later commented: "With him, I became a nervous wreck, crying and jumping when the phone started ringing, incapable of walking calmly across a room." Preminger imposed an intense, constant and minute level of control over Seberg throughout their association, and her co-star Richard Widmark later characterised Preminger's behaviour towards her as "sadistic". Tom Tryon, the star of Preminger's 1963 feature The Cardinal, received similar treatment—Preminger would scream at him, zoom in on his shaking hands, and repeatedly fired and rehired him, with the result that Tryon was hospitalised with a body rash and peeling skin, due to nerves. Interviewed some 30 years later, Tryon admitted that he still hated talking about the experience, and his brother Bill Tryon told the same interviewer: "I'll never watch that movie again the rest of my life, knowing what Tom went through."

== Preservation ==
The Academy Film Archive has preserved several of Otto Preminger's films, including The Man With the Golden Arm, The Moon is Blue, The Cardinal and Advise & Consent.

== Personal life ==
Preminger and his wife Marion became increasingly estranged. He lived like a bachelor, as was the case when he met the burlesque performer Gypsy Rose Lee and began an open relationship with her during the mid-1940s.

Lee had already attempted to break into movie roles, but she was not taken seriously as anything more than a stripper. She acted mainly in very small roles in B pictures. Preminger's liaison with Lee produced a child, Erik. Lee rejected the idea of Preminger's helping to support the child and instead elicited a vow of silence from Preminger: he was not to reveal Erik's paternity to anyone, including Erik himself. Lee called the boy Erik Kirkland after her husband, Alexander Kirkland, from whom she was separated at the time. It was not until 1966, when Preminger was 60 years old and Erik was 22, that father and son finally met.

In May 1946, Marion asked for a divorce, after meeting a wealthy (and married) Swedish financier, Axel Wenner-Gren. The Premingers' divorce ended smoothly and speedily. Marion did not seek alimony, only personal belongings. Axel's wife, however, was unwilling to grant a divorce. Marion returned to Otto and resumed appearances as his wife, and nothing more. Preminger had begun dating Natalie Draper, a niece of Marion Davies.

From 1951 to 1960, Preminger was married to model Mary Gardner. However, while filming Carmen Jones (1954), Preminger began an affair with the film's star, Dorothy Dandridge, which lasted four years. During that period he advised her on career matters, including an offer made to Dandridge for the featured role of Tuptim in The King and I (1956). Preminger advised her to turn it down, as he believed it unworthy of her. The role went to Rita Moreno and the film was a smash hit, and Dandridge later regretted taking Preminger's advice.

During the 1968 presidential election, Preminger was supportive of Democratic presidential candidate Robert F. Kennedy, before he was assassinated.

In 1970, Preminger was a subject of ridicule in Tom Wolfe's essay Radical Chic: That Party at Lenny's, where he was portrayed verbally dueling with Black Panther Field Marshal Donald Cox.

In 1971, he married Hope Bryce, a costume designer, who remained his spouse until his death. They had two children: twins Mark William and Victoria Elizabeth.

== Death ==
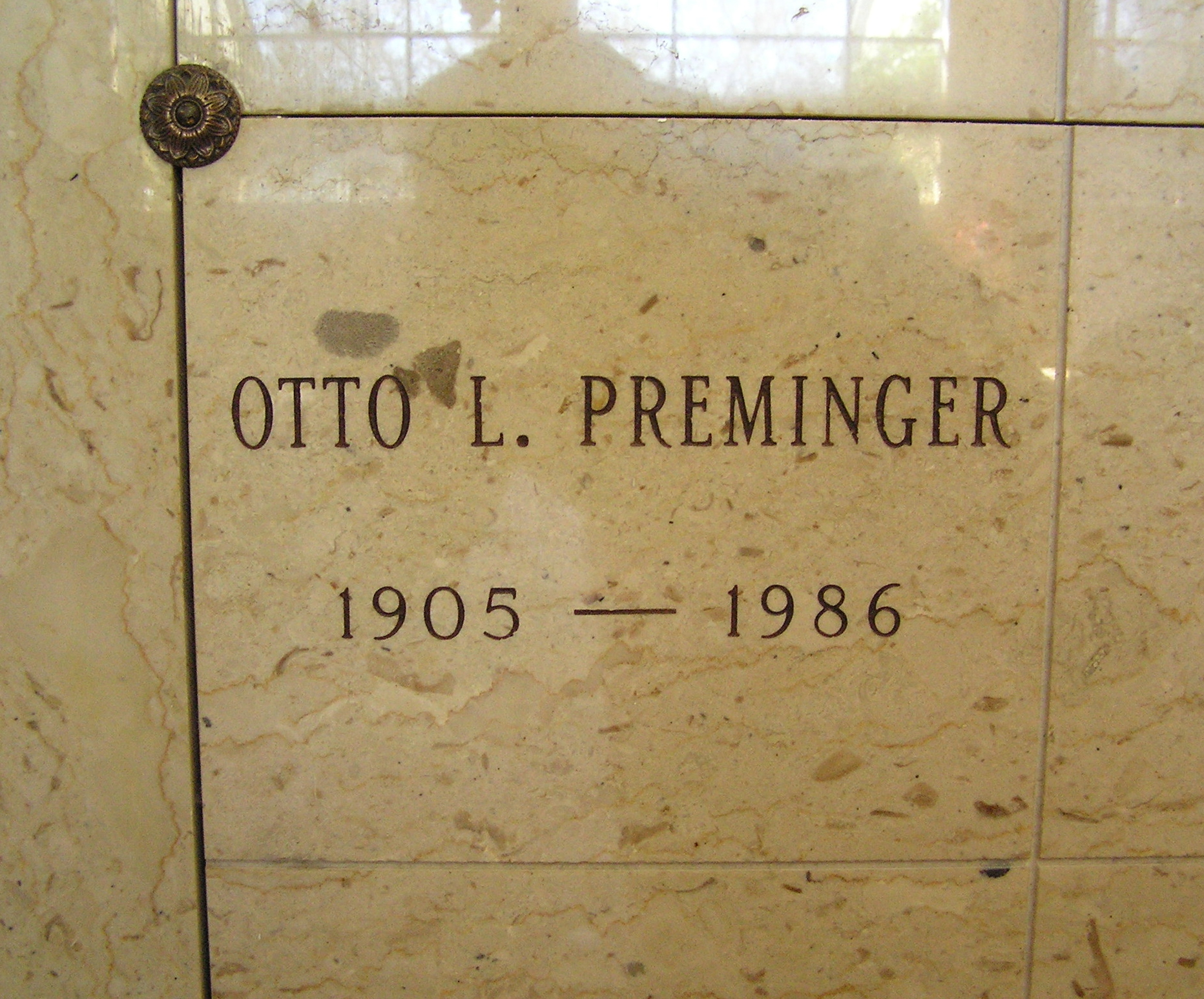
The niche of Otto Preminger in Woodlawn Cemetery (Bronx, New York)

Preminger died in his home on the Upper East Side of Manhattan in 1986, aged 80, from lung cancer. Some of Preminger's associates, including his son Erik, have said he suffered from Alzheimer's disease in his final years, though Hope Bryce denied that Preminger was ever diagnosed with Alzheimer's disease when interviewed by Foster Hirsch. He was survived by his wife, Hope, and three children: his son, Erik, and twins Mark William and Victoria Elizabeth. Preminger was cremated and his ashes are in a niche in the Azalea Room of the Velma B. Woolworth Memorial Chapel at Woodlawn Cemetery in the Bronx.

== Filmography ==
=== Films ===
Year	Title	Director	Producer
1931	Die große Liebe	Yes	No
1936	Under Your Spell	Yes	No
1937	Danger – Love at Work	Yes	No
1938	Kidnapped	Yes	No
1943	Margin for Error	Yes	No
1944	In the Meantime, Darling	Yes	Yes
1944	Laura	Yes	Yes
1945	A Royal Scandal	Yes	No
1945	Fallen Angel	Yes	Yes
1946	Centennial Summer	Yes	Yes
1947	Forever Amber	Yes	No
1947	Daisy Kenyon	Yes	Yes
1949	The Fan	Yes	Yes
1950	Whirlpool	Yes	Yes
1950	Where the Sidewalk Ends	Yes	Yes
1951	The 13th Letter	Yes	Yes
1953	Angel Face	Yes	Yes
1953	The Moon Is Blue	Yes	Yes
1953	Die Jungfrau auf dem Dach	Yes	Yes
1954	River of No Return	Yes	No
1954	Carmen Jones	Yes	Yes
1955	The Man with the Golden Arm	Yes	Yes
1955	The Court-Martial of Billy Mitchell	Yes	No
1957	Saint Joan	Yes	Yes
1958	Bonjour Tristesse	Yes	Yes
1959	Porgy and Bess	Yes	No
1959	Anatomy of a Murder	Yes	Yes
1960	Exodus	Yes	Yes
1962	Advise and Consent	Yes	Yes
1963	The Cardinal	Yes	Yes
1965	In Harm's Way	Yes	Yes
1965	Bunny Lake Is Missing	Yes	Yes
1967	Hurry Sundown	Yes	Yes
1968	Skidoo	Yes	Yes
1970	Tell Me That You Love Me, Junie Moon	Yes	Yes
1971	Such Good Friends	Yes	Yes
1975	Rosebud	Yes	Yes
1979	The Human Factor	Yes	Yes

=== Acting roles ===
Year	Title	Role	Note
1942	The Pied Piper	Major Diessen	
1943	Margin for Error	Karl Baumer	
1943	They Got Me Covered	Fauscheim	
1945	Where Do We Go from Here?	General Rahl	Uncredited
1953	Stalag 17	Oberst von Scherbach	
1953	Die Jungfrau auf dem Dach	Voice	
1954	Suspense	Captain von Weissenborn	Episode: "Operation: Barracuda"
1960	Exodus	Voice of opponent on the ship	Uncredited
1963	Jackie Gleason: American Scene Magazine	Himself/co-host	Episode: "The Many Worlds of Jackie Gleason"
1965	Bunny Lake Is Missing	On-screen trailer host and narrator	Uncredited
1966	Batman	Dr. Art Schivel / Mr. Freeze	2 episodes
1968	Skidoo	Voice	Uncredited
1968	Rowan & Martin's Laugh-In	Guest performer	4 episodes
1977	The Hobbit	Elvenking (voice)	Television film

== Awards ==
Preminger's Anatomy of a Murder was nominated for the Academy Award for Best Picture. As the producer of the film, he received the nomination. He was twice nominated for Best Director: for Laura and for The Cardinal. He won the Bronze Berlin Bear award for the film Carmen Jones at the 5th Berlin International Film Festival.

Accolades for Preminger's films
Year	Film	Academy Awards		BAFTA Awards		Golden Globe Awards	
Year	Film	Nominations	Wins	Nominations	Wins	Nominations	Wins
1944	Laura	5	1				
1946	Centennial Summer	2					
1947	Forever Amber	1					
1953	The Moon Is Blue	3		2		1	1
1954	Carmen Jones	2		2		2	2
1955	The Man with the Golden Arm	3		2			
1955	The Court-Martial of Billy Mitchell	1					
1958	Bonjour Tristesse			1			
1959	Porgy and Bess	4	1			3	1
1959	Anatomy of a Murder	7		3		4	
1960	Exodus	3	1			3	1
1962	Advise & Consent			1			
1963	The Cardinal	6				6	2
1965	In Harm's Way	1		1	1		
1965	Bunny Lake Is Missing			2			
1967	Hurry Sundown			1	1	1	
1971	Such Good Friends					1	
Total		38	3	15	2	21	7

Preceded by George Sanders	Mr. Freeze Actor; 1966	Succeeded by Eli Wallach
