= The Master of Thornfield =

Play written by Huntington Hartford

The Master of Thornfield is a 1954 play by Huntington Hartford, which is an adaptation of Charlotte Brontë's 1847 novel Jane Eyre. It was later rewritten by John F. Matthews.

The play marked Errol Flynn's return to the stage after many years.

== US Production ==
=== Errol Flynn ===
In 1957 it was announced Errol Flynn would star in a production in the US opposite Jan Brooks directed by Peter Ashmore.

Flynn had not appeared on stage since the 1930s. He was enticed to do so by a large salary, including free accommodation at one of Hartford's houses, and the writer's promise to produce a play that Flynn had written, an adaptation of the 1839 play Richelieu by Edward Bulwer-Lytton. Flynn was reportedly paid a flat fee of $100,000 plus $1,000 a week expenses.

The play opened in Detroit with a view of bringing it to New York. Variety reported response was "dismal".

Flynn struggled with the show, often forgetting lines. He quit the play in Cincinnati claiming that the play was "no more fit for Broadway than Jack and the Beanstalk... I can't do much with the way it's written." Hartford responded that, "In my defence, I'd like to say that I have as yet to hear my play, from Mr Flynn, as it was written." Flynn was replaced by John Emery and Demetrios Vilain replaced Ashmore as director.

Hedda Hopper later wrote that she heard Flynn "just wouldn't study" only rehearsing nine hours in four weeks, and thinking Flynn instead simply wanted to accept a role in The Roots of Heaven.

=== Post-Flynn ===
Eric Portman took over the role of Rochester and the production was renamed Jane Eyre. The production debut in New York on 1 May 1958 and ran for 52 performances.
