= A Fine Romance (film) =

1991 film directed by Gene Saks

- DVD Artwork
- Directed by: Gene Saks
- Written by: François Billetdoux (play Tchin-Tchin); Ronald Harwood
- Produced by: Arturo La Pegna; Massimiliano La Pegna
- Starring: Julie Andrews; Marcello Mastroianni
- Cinematography: Franco Di Giacomo
- Edited by: Richard Nord; Anna Poscetti
- Music by: Pino Donaggio
- Distributed by: CTV International (France); Castle Hill Productions (United States); Rank Film Distributors (United Kingdom)
- Release date: 1991
- Running time: 82 minutes
- Countries: Italy; France; United States
- Languages: Italian; English

A Fine Romance (Italian: Cin cin) is a 1991 comedy film directed by Gene Saks.

== Plot ==
An Italian gentleman, Cesareo, and a doctor's wife, Pamela, are living in Paris and he finds out that his wife is cheating with her husband at the same time that she finds out that her husband is cheating with his wife. They each follow their spouses and in the process meet each other. They plot to break up their spouses' tryst, and in the process get to know each other.

== Cast ==
- Julie Andrews as Mrs. Pamela Piquet
- Marcello Mastroianni as Mr. Cesareo Grimaldi
- Jean-Pierre Castaldi as Marcel
- Jonathan Cecil
- Ian Fitzgibbon
- Jean-Jacques Dulon as Dr. Noiret
- Maria Machado as Miss Knudson
- Denise Grey as Madame Legris
- Jean-Michel Cannone as Dr. Picquet
- Catherine Jarret as Marguerite (as Catherine Jarrett)
- Françoise Michaud as Madeleine
- Hervé Hiolle as Hospital Doctor
- Yvette Petit as 1st Concierge
- Michèle Amiel as 2nd Concierge
- Ronald Mills as Maitre
- Michele Buczynski as Sales Person Photo Shop
- Isidro Arruti as Waiter "Hotel particular"
