= Promise at Dawn (2017 film) =

2017 drama film

- Theatrical release poster
- French: La Promesse de l'aube
- Directed by: Éric Barbier
- Screenplay by: Éric Barbier; Marie Eynard
- Based on: Promise at Dawn by Romain Gary
- Produced by: Éric Jehelmann; Philippe Rousselet
- Starring: Pierre Niney; Charlotte Gainsbourg
- Cinematography: Glynn Speeckaert
- Edited by: Jennifer Augé
- Music by: Renaud Barbier
- Production companies: Jerico Films; Pathé Films; TF1 Films Production; Nexus Factory; Umedia; Lorette Cinéma
- Distributed by: Pathé Distribution; Alternative Films
- Release dates: 14 October 2017 (Busan); 20 December 2017 (France); 20 December 2017 (Belgium)
- Running time: 131 minutes
- Countries: France; Belgium
- Budget: €18–24.4 million
- Box office: $9.2 million

Promise at Dawn (French: La Promesse de l'aube) is a 2017 drama film directed by Éric Barbier, from a screenplay written by Barbier and Marie Eynard. It is the second screen adaptation of Romain Gary's 1960 autobiographical novel Promise at Dawn, following Jules Dassin's 1970 version. The film is a co-production between France and Belgium. It stars Pierre Niney and Charlotte Gainsbourg. It had its world premiere at the 22nd Busan International Film Festival on 14 October 2017. It was released in France and Belgium on 20 December 2017.

== Premise ==
Roman Kacew recounts his life, from his childhood through his service in World War II, and the story of his self-sacrificing mother Nina, who raised him alone.

== Cast ==
- Pierre Niney as Roman Kacew
  - Pawel Puchalski as Roman Kacew, ages 8–10
  - Nemo Schiffman as Roman Kacew, ages 14–16
- Charlotte Gainsbourg as Nina Kacew
- Didier Bourdon as Alex Gubernatis
- Jean-Pierre Darroussin as Zaremba
- Catherine McCormack as Lesley Blanch
- Finnegan Oldfield as Arnaud Langer
- Pascal Gruselle as Colonel Salon
- Alexandre Picot Sergeant Dufour
- Michel Schillaci as Intendant

== Production ==
The film was produced by Éric Jehelmann and Philippe Rousselet for Jerico Films, in co-production with Pathé Films, TF1 Films Production, Lorette Cinéma and Belgium's Nexus Factory and Umedia.

== Release ==
Promise at Dawn was first screened in a sneak preview at the Pathé cinema in Évreux, Normandy, in the presence of Éric Barbier. The film was selected to be screened in the World Cinema section at the 22nd Busan International Film Festival. It had its world premiere in Busan on 14 October 2017. It was theatrically released in France by Pathé Distribution on 20 December 2017. It was released the same day in Belgium by Alternative Films.

== Reception ==
=== Box office ===
On its first day, Promise at Dawn sold 46,358 admissions in France. At the end of its theatrical run in France, the film sold a total of 1,053,288 admissions, grossing a domestic total of $8.8 million and a worldwide total of $9.2 million.

=== Critical response ===
Promise at Dawn received an average rating of 3.3 out of 5 stars on the French website AlloCiné, based on 30 reviews. On Rotten Tomatoes, the film holds an approval rating of 64% based on 11 reviews, with an average rating of 6.4/10.

Ben Kenigsberg of The New York Times wrote, "The movie looks and sounds great, but greatness and depth elude it".

=== Accolades ===
Award	Date of ceremony	Category	Recipient(s)	Result	Ref.
César Awards	2 March 2018	Best Actress	Charlotte Gainsbourg	Nominated	
César Awards	2 March 2018	Best Adaptation	Éric Barbier and Marie Eynard	Nominated	
César Awards	2 March 2018	Best Production Design	Pierre Renson	Nominated	
César Awards	2 March 2018	Best Costume Design	Catherine Bouchard	Nominated	
Lumière Awards	5 February 2018	Best Actress	Charlotte Gainsbourg	Nominated	
Sarlat Film Festival	18 November 2017	Prix des lycéens	Promise at Dawn	Won	
Sarlat Film Festival	18 November 2017	Prix d'interprétation masculine	Pierre Niney	Won	
