= The Dance of Genghis Cohn =

Dance of Genghis Cohn
- Author: Romain Gary
- Original title: La Danse de Gengis Cohn
- Translator: Romain Gary assisted by Camilla Sykes
- Language: English
- Subject: Post Holocaust novel
- Publisher: New American Library
- Publication date: 1968
- Publication place: United States

The Dance of Genghis Cohn is a novel by Romain Gary originally published in French by Éditions Gallimard in 1967. It is the middle volume of his Brother Ocean trilogy.

== Plot summary ==
The soul of Moishe Cohn, alias Genghis Cohn, a Jewish comedian killed by the SS in 1944, is now a dybbuk inhabiting the mind of Commandant Schatz, the Nazi who ordered his execution.

The story takes place after World War II. Schatz has become police commissioner in Licht. He investigates a series of mysterious murders: all the victims are men found with their pants down and an extraordinary smile on their faces. During the investigation,he is harassed by interventions from Cohn, his former prisoner and victim from his time in the SS.

== Theme ==
Dark humor is a large part of this novel, which deals not only with the Holocaust but also with Jewish identity and humanity in general.

In 1993 A&E Network in partnership with the BBC produced a television adaptation of the novel directed by Elijah Moshinsky. Antony Sher stars as Cohn opposite Robert Lindsay playing the former Nazi Otto Schatz. Diana Rigg appears in a cameo and a very young Daniel Craig has a role as a zealous police officer.
