= Maria Machado (actress) =

French-German actress

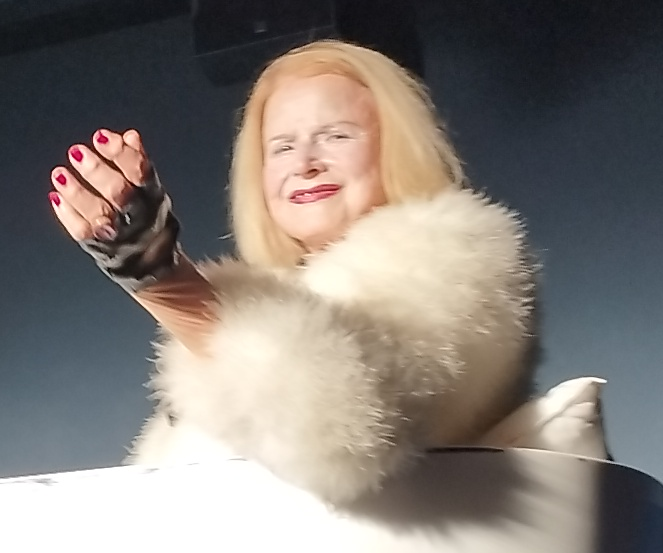
- Maria Machado in 2024
- Born: 16 October 1937 (age 87); Karlsruhe, Germany

Maria Machado (born 16 October 1937) is a German-born French actress and stage director.

== Biography ==
After some years of repertory theatre in Germany, Machado moved to Paris in 1965. There actress Tania Balachova introduced her to French theatre. She made her film debut in "Monsieur le président-directeur général" (1966).

== Personal life ==
On 26 February 1975, she married Roland Dubillard.

== Partial filmography ==
=== Movies ===
- Is Paris Burning? (1966) - Stella (uncredited)
- Promise at Dawn (1970) - Nathalie Lissenko
- Rosebud (1975) - Else
- Anthracite (1980)
- Charlotte (1980) - Frau Schwartz
- Derborence (1985) - Aline
- Natalia (1988) - Inge Schwarzwald
- A Fine Romance (1991) - Miss Knudson
- The Last Hammer Blow (2014)

=== Television ===
- Combat! (1962) (1 episode) - Denise
- The Gallant Men (1963) (1 episode) - Contessa Loren
- 77 Sunset Strip (1963) (1 episode) - Adrianne Monet
- Allô police (1967) (1 episode) - Nelly
- Face aux Lancaster (1971) (12 episodes) - Alma Lincoln
- Deux amies d'enfance (1983) (1 episode) - Anna
- Capitaine Marleau (2023) (1 episode) - Daniele Dulac
