= Lady L. (novel) =

1958 novel by Romain Gary

- First US edition
- Author: Romain Gary
- Language: English
- Publisher: Michael Joseph (UK); Simon & Schuster (US)
- Publication date: 1958
- Publication place: France
- Pages: 167

Lady L. is a 1958 novel by the French writer Romain Gary. Gary wrote the book in English and supervised Jean Rosenthal's translation into French published in 1963. Lady L. is in love with the anarchist Armand, who fathers her son, thereby founding a dynasty of illustrious grandchildren, while she marries Lord Glendale. When Armand and Lady L. rendezvous in the summerhouse, she realizes that the anarchist cause is Armand's true love. He will always use her; he will never be hers. She persuades him to hide from the approaching authorities in the Madras strongbox. Sixty years later, she unlocks the box before the horrified Poet Laureate, revealing Armand's skeleton.

== See also ==
- 1958 in literature
- 20th-century French literature
