= The Roots of Heaven (film) =

1958 film by John Huston

- Theatrical release poster
- Directed by: John Huston
- Screenplay by: Romain Gary; Patrick Leigh-Fermor
- Based on: The Roots of Heaven (1956 novel) by Romain Gary
- Produced by: Darryl F. Zanuck
- Starring: Errol Flynn; Juliette Gréco; Trevor Howard; Eddie Albert; Orson Welles; Paul Lukas; Herbert Lom
- Cinematography: Oswald Morris
- Edited by: Russell Lloyd
- Music by: Malcolm Arnold
- Production company: Darryl F. Zanuck Productions
- Distributed by: 20th Century-Fox
- Release dates: October 15, 1958 (New York); December 31, 1958 (Los Angeles)
- Running time: 126 minutes
- Country: United States
- Language: English
- Budget: $3.3 million
- Box office: $3 million

The Roots of Heaven is a 1958 American adventure film directed by John Huston and produced by Darryl F. Zanuck. The screenplay was written by Romain Gary and Patrick Leigh Fermor based on Romain Gary's 1956 novel of the same name. The film stars Errol Flynn, Juliette Gréco, Trevor Howard, Eddie Albert, Orson Welles, Paul Lukas, Herbert Lom, and Grégoire Aslan. The film was distributed by 20th Century-Fox.

== Plot ==
In French Equatorial Africa, crusading environmentalist Morel endeavors to preserve the elephants from extinction as a lasting symbol of freedom for all humanity. He is helped by Minna, a nightclub hostess, and Major Forsythe, a disgraced British military officer hoping to redeem himself.

== Cast ==
- Errol Flynn as Maj. Forsythe
- Juliette Gréco as Minna
- Trevor Howard as Morel
- Eddie Albert as Abe Fields
- Orson Welles as Cy Sedgewick
- Paul Lukas as Saint Denis
- Herbert Lom as Orsini
- Grégoire Aslan as Habib
- André Luguet as Governor
- Frederick Ledebur as Peer Qvist
- Edric Connor as Waitari
- Oliver Hussenot as The Baron
- Pierre Dudan as Maj. Scholscher
- Marc Doelnitz as De Vries
- Francis de Wolff as Father Fargue
- Dan Jackson as Madjumba
- Maurice Cannon as Haas
- Jacques Marin as Cerisot
- Alain Saury as A.D.C.

== Production ==
=== Development ===
20th Century-Fox bought the film rights the novel by Romain Gary in April 1957 for more than $100,000. The novel had sold over 300,000 copies in Europe, but had not yet been released in the U.S., where it would become a bestseller. In May, Darryl F. Zanuck announced that he would produce the film independently for Fox (he had a contract with the studio to make films), and wanted John Huston to direct. Zanuck said that the theme of the film was "simple ... A man comes to the conclusion that if we don't stop killing people we destroy ourselves.' And he says, 'Why not start with our biggest companions on earth, the elephants, whose only enemy is man?'" He later added:

This picture is really great for us – intellectually great. Whether it's commercially great, whether people will grab on to it, we must wait and see. If they grab on to a man in love with a bridge, then why shouldn't they grab on to a man in love with an elephant?

Huston said that he wanted to direct the novel before Zanuck approached him:

After my experience with Selznick [on A Farewell to Arms] – all those memorandum! – I'd sworn never to work with a producer again, but I did want very much to make this particular film. So we met several times and talked it through and finally agreed to try it.

Huston agreed to direct for a fee he described as "slightly higher" than $300,000. Regarding the irony of a big-game hunter like Huston making a film about a militant elephant conservationist, Huston said: "Contrary to prevailing opinion, I never found an elephant big enough to justify the sin of killing one." Zanuck visited the Belgian Congo in late 1957 to scout locations.

=== Casting ===
William Holden was mentioned as a possibility for the lead part of Morel, as was James Mason. Holden wanted to take the role but he was under contract to Paramount, which would not permit him to make the film unless he signed another contract, but he refused.

The lead role was taken by Trevor Howard. Errol Flynn signed to play a key support role but was given top billing. Flynn left the cast of the play The Master of Thornfield to appear in the film. Flynn and Huston had famously brawled at a Hollywood party more than a decade earlier.

Juliette Gréco, who had appeared in Zanuck's version of The Sun Also Rises and became his lover, was signed as the female lead Minna. Eddie Albert and Paul Lukas were also cast, and Orson Welles agreed to play a cameo role.

=== Shooting ===
Shooting took place mainly on location in French Equatorial Africa over five months in the Belgian Congo and Chad in the Northern Cameroons, where the elephants were located. The cast and crew suffered from heat, malaria and other tropical diseases. Temperatures would routinely reach 134 °F (57 °C) in the day and 95 °F (35 °C) degrees at night, and people would shower four or five times per night. Some days required a four-hour drive to the location and back, and all water was transported to the set by aircraft. Gréco contracted a serious illness and the company reported 900 sick calls from a cast and crew of 120. Flynn mentioned the challenges of the location with affection in his autobiography My Wicked, Wicked Ways (1959).

Zanuck said "I would never make a picture there again" but he was proud that "[t]here is not one dubbed line, transparency plate or process shot in the whole picture." The unit then moved to Paris for studio filming. While there, Gréco fell ill with a recurrence of her illness. Flynn also had a recurrence of malaria requiring hospitalization. Welles filmed his part over two days at a Paris studio. His rate was normally $15,000, but he was not paid because he wished to reciprocate Zanuck for helping Welles fund Othello (1952).

Huston later said: "I still don't want to have to work with a producer again but if I had to, I'd certainly choose Darryl. He's been very good, co-operative and decent throughout." He also said that he was "completely responsible... for the badness of The Roots of Heaven. I really wanted to make that one and Daryl Zanuck got me everything and everybody I wanted. But I had the screenplay done by someone who had never done one before, and it was bad. By then the cast, crew and me were in Africa; it was too late to turn back, we would have spent a fortune for nothing, so we went ahead and did the best we could." He also said that Roots of Heaven "could have been a very fine film. And largely owing to me was not a good film at all."

=== Post-production ===
The film was edited in London rather than Paris so that Zanuck could be near Gréco, who was making Whirlpool there.

== Release ==
The film opened at the Palace Theatre in New York City on October 15, 1958.

== Reception ==
=== Box office ===
The film earned rentals of $3 million in the United States and Canada and recorded admissions of 1,266,452 in France.

=== Critical ===
In a contemporary review for The New York Times, critic Bosley Crowther wrote: "After the intermission, the final third of the film goes down the drain. This is the more disappointing—and strangely surprising, indeed—because the elements, up to this point, have seemed so beautifully under control. ... The screen play just goes to pieces. ... And the performances, which are forceful in the first two-thirds of the film, run progressively to twaddle as the survivors stagger toward the end. ... The Roots of Heaven does not go deep in sandy soil."

Upon the film's Los Angeles-area release on December 31, 1958, critic Philip K. Scheuer of the Los Angeles Times wrote: "John Huston may have bitten off more than he could chew in The Roots of Heaven, but much of it makes for thoughtful mastication. ... it sometimes seems too strange to be real."

FilmInk called the film "possibly the first big budget studio film about an eco-terrorist (unless you count Tarzan movies)."

== Impact on popular culture ==
The sounds of the TIE fighter from Star Wars, and later Star Wars films, were created in part by reusing and altering the recordings of aggravated elephants vocalizing in later scenes in The Roots of Heaven. Star Wars sound director Ben Burtt described that because the film was produced by 20th Century Fox, he and his team had access to a vast array of old sound properties produced by the studio.

== Release ==
=== Home media ===
The film was first released on Blu-ray in 2011 by Twilight Time in a limited edition of 3,000 units. The only special feature on the disc is an isolated score track.

== See also ==
- List of American films of 1958

== Bibliography ==
- Flynn, E. My Wicked, Wicked Ways. G.P. Putnam's Sons 1959, Pan Books 1961 in association with William Heinemann Ltd, 5th Printing 1979.
- Norman, B. The Hollywood Greats. Arrow Books, 1988 edition.
- Solomon, Aubrey. Twentieth Century Fox: A Corporate and Financial History (The Scarecrow Filmmakers Series). Lanham, Maryland: Scarecrow Press, 1989. ISBN 978-0-8108-4244-1.
- Thomas, T. Behlmer, R. & McCarty, C. The Films of Errol Flynn. Citadel Press. 1969.
