= Promise at Dawn (novel) =

1960 novel by Romain Gary

- First UK edition (publ. Michael Joseph)
- Author: Romain Gary
- Original title: La promesse de l'aube
- Translator: John Markham Beach
- Language: French
- Publisher: Éditions Gallimard
- Publication date: 1960
- Publication place: France
- English publication date: 1961
- Pages: 374

Promise at Dawn (French: La promesse de l'aube) is a 1960 autobiographical novel by the French writer Romain Gary.

== Summary ==
Romain Gary tells the story of his childhood and youth with his mother, a Russian former actress carried by a love and unconditional faith in her son. The story, full of humor and tenderness, tells the story of her tireless battle against adversity, the extravagant energy she deploys so that he attain to a great destiny, and the efforts of Romain, who is willing to do all to make his life coincide "with the naive dream of the one he loves".

The first part begins with the reveries of a mature Romain, remembering how, out of love for his mother, he had decided to stand against the stupidity and meanness of the world. It then relates his childhood years in the city of Wilno (now Vilnius). Romain's mother instills in him his dreams of triumph: he will be a great man, admired and adulated, a great persuader, a great artist. They will go to France, a country she adorns with all virtues. During a brief period of prosperity, due to the success of a "Parisian haute couture" shop energetically run by his mother, he leads an extravagant lifestyle with a whole host of tutors. His mother pushes him, without success, into various artistic activities, and he does his best to discover his talents. He begins to write (or more precisely to look for pseudonyms evoking his future glory). He tells how he later become what his mother had predicted — a famous writer, a war hero while relating the penniless period that followed their arrival in Wilno. His mother, to his horror, would announce his ambitions to the neighbors, and was duly showered with jibes. The failure of the fashion house brings them back to hard times. They move to Warsaw, "temporarily", awaiting their move to what they consider their "real" country, France. A humiliation at school - he did not react whereas his mother was called "cocotte" - leads to the decision to move to Nice.

In the second part, the narrator refers to his adolescence in Nice. Romain's mother, despite her energy in the face of adversity, is forced to ask for help ~ we imagine that she turns to the father of Romain. Romain devotes himself to writing, in order to attain the expected fame. He also makes his first experiences as a man, making his mother proud. She at last finds stability by becoming manager of the Hotel-Pension Mermonts. Life becomes happy. And yet, Romain is plagued by the worry that he will not succeed in time to offer his victory to his mother, when he learns that she has diabetes, a fact she had been hiding from him for two years. Old and sick, she continues to fight forcefully and to convey to her son her certainty of a bright future for him. He moves to Aix-en-Provence, then to Paris to get a law degree, and in 1938 becomes an officer cadet at the air school of Salon-de-Provence. But he is not promoted, because he has only recently become a French citizen, and he invents a lie to avoid giving his mother too painful a disappointment. When the war breaks out, he goes as a simple corporal. He sees her again in 1940 on leave, and when he leaves her she is very unwell.

The third part covers the war years, during which he receives from his mother countless letters of encouragement and exhortations to valor. Having joined the Free French Air Forces, he fights in Great Britain and Africa and ends the war with the rank of captain. He is made Compagnon de la Libération and officer of the Legion d'Honneur. He publishes Éducation européenne in 1945 in England, which gets a favorable reception, and he is given the opportunity to enter the diplomatic service for "exceptional services". Returning to Nice at the end of the war, he discovers that his mother has died three and a half years earlier, having given a friend the task of sending her son hundreds of letters that she had written for him in the days preceding her death.

== Adaptations ==
Samuel Taylor adapted the novel into a three-act play named First Love (New York opening: 25 Dec 1961).

Two films based on the novel, and sharing the same title, have been released: Promise at Dawn (1970) directed by Jules Dassin, and Promise at Dawn (2017) directed by Éric Barbier.

== See also ==
- 1960 in literature
- 20th-century French literature
