= White Dog (1982 film) =

1982 film by Samuel Fuller

- Theatrical release poster
- Directed by: Samuel Fuller
- Screenplay by: Samuel Fuller; Curtis Hanson
- Based on: White Dog by Romain Gary
- Produced by: Jon Davison
- Starring: Kristy McNichol; Paul Winfield; Burl Ives; Jameson Parker; Parley Baer
- Cinematography: Bruce Surtees
- Edited by: Bernard Gribble
- Music by: Ennio Morricone
- Production company: Paramount Pictures
- Distributed by: Paramount Pictures
- Release dates: July 7, 1982 (France); November 12, 1982 (United States)
- Running time: 90 minutes
- Country: United States
- Language: English
- Budget: $7 million
- Box office: $46,509 (domestic)

White Dog is a 1982 American drama horror film directed by Samuel Fuller and written by Fuller and Curtis Hanson, based on Romain Gary's 1970 novel of the same title. Executive Producers were Edgar J. Scherick and Nick Vanoff. The film depicts the struggle of a dog trainer named Keys (Paul Winfield), who is black, trying to retrain a stray dog found by a young actress (Kristy McNichol), that is a "white dog"—a dog trained to make vicious attacks upon, and to kill, any black person. Fuller uses the film as a platform to deliver a message against racism as it examines the question of whether racism is a treatable problem or an incurable condition.

The film's theatrical release was suppressed for a week in the United States by Paramount Pictures out of concern over negative press after rumors began circulating that the film was racist. Prior to the date, it was released internationally in France in July 1982. Its first official American home video release came in December 2008 when The Criterion Collection released the original uncut film to DVD.

Critics praised the film's hard-line look at racism and Fuller's use of melodrama and metaphors to present his argument, and its somewhat disheartening ending that leaves the impression that once racism is learned, it cannot be cured. Reviewers consistently questioned the film's lack of wide release in the United States when it was completed and applauded its belated release by Criterion.

== Plot ==
While driving through the Los Angeles hills at night, white actress Julie Sawyer accidentally runs over a stray White Shepherd dog. After the veterinarian treats him, Julie takes him home while trying to find his owners. A rapist breaks into her house and tries to attack her, but the dog protects her. She decides to adopt him, against the wishes of her boyfriend Roland Graele. Unbeknownst to her, the dog was trained by a white racist to attack black people on sight. The dog sneaks out of the house and kills a black truck driver. Later, Julie takes the dog to work with her, and he mauls a black actress on the set.

Julie takes the dog to a trainer, Carruthers, who tells her to euthanize the dog. Another dog trainer, Keys, who is black, decides to try to retrain the dog. He dons protective gear and keeps the dog in a large enclosure, taking him out on a chain and exposing himself to the dog each day and making sure he is the only one to feed or care for the dog.

The dog escapes and kills an elderly black man in a church. Keys recovers him and opts not to turn him over to authorities to continue the training, over Julie's protests. He warns her that the training has reached a tipping point, where the dog might be cured or go insane. He believes that curing the dog will discourage white racists from training dogs like this.

Eventually, the dog becomes friendly towards Keys. Julie confronts the dog's original owner, who has come to claim him. She angrily tells him the dog has been cured by a black person in front of his grandchildren who knew the dog to be a loving pet. Just as Julie and Keys celebrate their victory, the dog, without warning, turns its attention to Carruthers and attacks him. To save his employer's life, Keys is forced to shoot and kill the dog.

== Cast ==
- Kristy McNichol as Julie Sawyer
- Paul Winfield as Keys
- Burl Ives as Carruthers
- Jameson Parker as Roland Grale
- Parley Baer as Wilber Hull
- Samuel Fuller as Charlie Felton
- Christa Lang as Nurse
- Helen J. Siff as Pound Operator
- Lynne Moody as Molly

== Production ==
White Dog's roots lie with a 1970 autobiographical novel written by Romain Gary of the same title. The story was purchased for use by Paramount in 1975, with Curtis Hanson selected to write the screenplay and Roman Polanski hired to direct. Before shooting commenced, Polanski was charged with rape and fled the country, leaving the production in limbo. Over a span of six years, the project was given to various writers and producers, who all focused on the stray dog story from Gary's original work. Gary's activist wife was replaced in the script with a young, unmarried actress because Paramount wanted to contrast the dog's random attacks with a loving relationship between the protagonist and the dog. Paramount executives noted that they wanted a "Jaws with paws" and indicated that they wanted any racial elements to be downplayed. In one memo, the company noted: "Given the organic elements of this story, it is imperative that we never overtly address through attitude or statement the issue of racism per se."

By 1981, both Gary's wife and, shortly after, Gary himself had committed suicide. At the same time, Hollywood was under threat of strikes by both the Writers' and Directors' Guilds. Needing enough films to carry the studio through in case the strikes happened, White Dog was one of 13 films considered to be far enough along to be completable in a short time frame. With a push from Michael Eisner, White Dog was one of seven that Paramount put on a fast track for production. Eisner pushed for the film to be one of the selected ones because of its social message that hate was learned. Producer Jon Davison was less certain and, early on, he questioned how the film was being marketed. Hanson, back on board as the film's screenwriter, suggested that Samuel Fuller be named the film's director as he felt Fuller was the only one available with the experience needed to complete the film on such a short schedule and with a low budget, while still doing so responsibly with regard to the sensitive material. Davison agreed after visiting Fuller and seeing Fuller act out how he would shoot the film.

Fuller readily agreed, having focused much of his own career on racial issues. Already familiar with the novel and with the concept of "white dogs", he was tasked with "reconceptualizing" the film to have the conflict depicted in the book occur within the dog rather than the people. In an earlier Variety magazine interview, Fuller stated that viewers would "see a dog slowly go insane and then come back to sanity." Before filming began, the National Association for the Advancement of Colored People (NAACP), the Black Anti-Defamation Coalition (BADC), and other civil-rights leaders began voicing concerns that the film would spur racial violence. In an editorial in the Los Angeles Times, Robert Price, executive director of the BADC, criticized the studio for producing the film based on a book by a white man and using a primarily white cast and crew, rather than producing the film with African Americans in key positions. He also considered Gary's work to be a "second-rate novel" and questioned its use when "bookshelves are laden with quality novels by black writers who explore the same social and psychological areas with far more subtlety?"

Fuller, however, was confident in his work and the idea that the film would be strongly anti-racist, particularly with the changes he had made to the original work. The original novel's hate-filled Muslim black trainer, who had deliberately retrained the dog to attack white people, was converted into the character of Keys, who genuinely wished to cure the animal. Fuller also changed the novel's original ending into a more pessimistic film ending. The film was shot in only forty-five days at a cost of US$7 million. Five white German Shepherd Dogs played the unnamed central character.

Shelve the film without letting anyone see it? I was dumbfounded. It's difficult to express the hurt of having a finished film locked away in a vault, never to be screened for an audience. It's like someone putting your newborn baby in a goddamned maximum-security prison forever ... Moving to France for a while would alleviate some of the pain and doubt that I had to live with because of White Dog.

— White Dog: Sam Fuller Unmuzzled, Samuel Fuller, as quoted by J. Hoberman, Criterion Collection

After filming commenced, Paramount Pictures brought in two African-American consultants to review and approve the depiction of the black characters: Willis Edwards, vice president of the local NAACP chapter, and David L. Crippens, the vice president and stage manager of the local PBS affiliate. In the end, they walked away with different views of the film. Crippens did not find the film to have any racist connotations, while Edwards found it inflammatory and felt it should not have been made, particularly not during that year, when a series of murders of black children was occurring in Atlanta. The two men provided a write-up of their views for the studio executives, which were passed to Davison along with warnings that the studio feared a film boycott. But Fuller was neither told of these discussions, nor given the notes, until two weeks before filming was slated to conclude. Known for being a staunch integrationist and for his regularly giving black actors non-stereotypical roles, Fuller was furious, finding the studio's actions insulting. He reportedly had both representatives banned from the set afterwards, though he did integrate some of the suggested changes into the film.

The film was completed in 1981, but Paramount was hesitant to release the film out of continuing concerns that the film would be misconstrued. Though no one from the organization had viewed the completed film, the NAACP threatened boycotts. In early 1982, the studio finally held a preview screening in Seattle and later, in August, in Denver, with mixed responses. It was finally released in the US at five Detroit theatres on November 12, 1982, for just one week, with no trailer, no poster and no promotion at all. It did no business and was shelved as uncommercial by Paramount. Dumbfounded and hurt by the film's shelving, Fuller moved to France and never directed another American film.

Later in April 1987, during an interview held in Milan, Fuller stated that Paramount shelved the film also because they feared negative reactions from the Ku Klux Klan.

Edgar Scherick was credited as executive producer but admits to having little to do with the film. He said Paramount gave him the movie after it cancelled another project the studio had with Scherick.

== Themes ==
White Dog is a "blunt, highly cinematic parable about race relations" that questions whether racism is a curable mental illness or learned behavior, or if it is an untreatable disease. The unnamed white German Shepherd is the metaphor of racism, with his radically contrasting moments of innocent, typical dog behavior when not around black persons, and his snarling viciousness when he sees a target. Paul Winfield's character Keys, who believes he can help the dog unlearn this behavior, represents the view that racism can be unlearned. Keys's attempts to reprogram the dog become a "bold literalization of the race war," and as the film progresses Keys becomes obsessed with the idea that he can cure the dog. Much like Captain Ahab, he declares that if he fails with this dog, he will find another and another until he succeeds. Keys's counterpart, Carruthers, a white trainer, believes the dog is irredeemable and should be killed, representing the view that racism cannot be cured.

The snarling dog, its white fur stained with bright red stage blood, becomes a typically imposing, outscale Fuller image – the embodiment of snarling, irrational and implacable hatred. Typical, too, is the way Fuller emphasizes the radical contrast between the dog in its innocent, unaroused state – big brown eyes staring up at McNichol – and its plunging, salivating attack mode.

— Dave Kehr, Chicago Tribune

Scenes showing Kristy McNichol innocently burying her hands in the dog's fur and his normal loving behavior when alone with her provides a stark image of "how hatred can be familiar, reassuringly close." J. Hoberman argues that the film "naturalizes racism in an unnatural way" in the contrasting depictions of white characters horrified by the dog's behavior, and black characters who grimly accept it as a fact of life. The film's ending has been argued to emphasize Fuller's own view that racism is something that is learned, but that once learned is a "poison" that can never truly "be banished from those it infects." But on the other hand, the dog is actually cured of attacking blacks, but not cured of his own hatred since the last thing he does is to attack a white man, and without being provoked into doing so at that. The ending implies therefore that it is hatred (and not racism) that cannot be banished from those it infects.

In Romain Gary's original novel, this was not the story that was told—the dog started to attack white people because a black man embittered by white racism deliberately retrained him to do so.

== Distribution ==
Paramount felt the film was too controversial for release, giving it only a few preview showings and a one-week run in Detroit before shelving it. The film's first theatrical release occurred in France on July 7, 1982. In the United Kingdom, it was part of the 37th Edinburgh International Film Festival and the 27th London Film Festival in 1983, and was released late that year by United International Pictures. It received positive reviews in both countries. Lisa Dombrowski of Film Comment notes, "In the end, Sam Fuller's White Dog was muzzled by a collision of historically specific economic and political interests, as support for freedom of expression took a back seat to Paramount's bottom line and the NAACP's ongoing battles with Hollywood over representation and employment. A Sam Fuller thriller was simply not the kind of antiracist picture that a major studio knew how to market in 1981 or that African-American organizations wanted Hollywood to make at the time."

In 1983, White Dog was edited for a direct-to-television broadcast and made available for purchase by cable channels. The following year, NBC bought broadcast rights for $2.5 million and slated the film to air during the February sweeps, then canceled the broadcast two days later due to pressure from the continuing NAACP campaign and concerns of a negative reaction by both viewers and advertisers. The film was eventually aired on other cable channels such as HBO, Showtime, and The Movie Channel sporadically and without fanfare. It was also infrequently screened at independent film houses and film festivals.

In 1991, Michael Schlesinger, then head of Paramount's repertory division, convinced his bosses to let him book the film as part of a complete Fuller retrospective at New York's Film Forum. He did not tell them that it would be a full one-week booking, instead of the usual single day, and billed as its New York premiere. The film received rave reviews and crowds packed the theatre; at year's end, The Village Voice called it the best film of the year. Demands to play the film increased. After some deliberation, Paramount said he could continue to accept dates provided that there would be no "racial" outcry; if there were, he would have to stop. He accepted the deal, and it successfully played revival houses in the rest of the country without incident.

Its first official American home video release came on December 2, 2008, when The Criterion Collection released the film to DVD. The DVD has the uncut version of the film, video interviews from the original producer and writer, an interview with the trainer of the dog used in the film, and a booklet of critical essays. The National Society of Film Critics bestowed the distributor with a special film heritage award for releasing the film.

== Reception ==
Because of its limited release, it only grossed $46,509. The film received critical acclaim upon its release, particularly for its treatment of racism and Fuller's directorial talents. On the review aggregator website Rotten Tomatoes, 94% of 18 critics' reviews are positive, with an average rating of 7.9/10. Dave Kehr, of the Chicago Tribune, praised Fuller for "pulling no punches" in the film and for his use of metaphors to present racism "as a mental disease, for which there may or may not be a cure." Kehr considered the film less melodramatic or bizarre than Fuller's earlier works, which was also positive since it left the film "clean and uncluttered with a single, concentrated line of development mounting toward a single, crushingly pessimistic moral insight." Entertainment Weekly's Kim Moran called it a "uncompromising, poignant examination of racism" and felt it was one of Fuller's most inspired films and a "gripping, meditative, and ultimately beautiful achievement." Video Business reviewer Cyril Pearl called it "bombastic, odd and quite chilling" and felt the film was an antiracist work that "deserve[d] an audience."

Full of startling close-ups and arresting visual contrasts (above all the stirring image of the ebony hand soothing the hound's snarling pale snout), it's a work that envisions racism not with a guttersnipe's shrill righteousness but with a scarred humanist's awareness of how ignorance and pain can be toxically ingrained into the fiber of society.

— White Dog, Fernando F. Croce, Slant Magazine

Charles Taylor, writing for The New York Times, lambasted the film's original suppression due to "the stupidity of pressure groups" that wrongly labeled the film as racist when it is, in his words, "a profoundly antiracist film, though a despairing one." He praised Winfield's tense performance and Fuller's use of melodrama to create one of his "most potent" films. Lisa Dombrowski, the author of The Films of Samuel Fuller: If You Die, I'll Kill You! and an associate professor of film studies at Wesleyan University, referred to the film as "an impassioned attack on racial hatred." Another New York Times reviewer, Janet Maslin, praised Fuller's "command of stark, spooky imagery," "B-style bluntness," and the way the cinematography, scene setting, and soundtrack combine to give the film "the blunt, unnerving power of a horror story." She also commended Paul Winfield's performance as Keys, feeling the actor turned what might have been a boring character into one audiences would find interesting. Slant Magazine's Fernando F. Croce felt the film was "part marauding-animal horror movie, part Afterschool Special, [and] part tragic-sardonic agitprop" B-movie that is "searing confrontation of the irrationality of prejudice."

In The Magic Hour: Film at Fin de Siècle, J. Hoberman referred to the film as an "unusually blunt and suggestive metaphoric account of American racism". Though he felt the film was a "sad waste" of Fuller's talent, he praised the director's treatment of the work, including the changes made to the source material, noting that "filmed in headlines, framed as allegory, White Dog combines hard-boiled sentimentality and hysterical violence." He praised the musical score used in the film for lending dignity to the "iconic visuals and cartoon dialogue."

== See also ==
- List of films about animals
