= Romain Gary =

French writer and diplomat (1914–1980)

- Gary in 1961
- Born: Roman Leibovich Kacew; 21 May 1914; Vilnius, Vilna Governorate, Russian Empire (present-day Lithuania)
- Died: 2 December 1980 (aged 66); Paris, France
- Citizenship: Russian Empire (until 1917); Republic of Poland; France (after 1935)
- Education: Faculté de droit d'Aix-en-Provence; Paris Law Faculty
- Occupations: Diplomat, pilot, writer
- Spouses: Lesley Blanch (m. 1944; div. 1961) Jean Seberg (m. 1962; div. 1970)
- Children: 1
- Writing career
- Pen name: Émile Ajar, Fosco Sinibaldi, Shatan Bogat
- Language: French, English, Polish, Russian, Yiddish
- Period: 1945–1979
- Genre: Novel
- Notable works: Les Racines du ciel La Vie devant soi
- Notable awards: Prix Goncourt (1956 and 1975)
- Military career
- Allegiance: France; Free France
- Branch: French Air Force; Free French Air Forces
- Service years: 1938-1940 (France); 1940-1945 (Free France)
- Rank: Captain
- Unit: Groupe de Bombardement n° 1/20 "Lorraine"

Romain Gary (Note: pronounced [ʁɔ.mɛ̃ ga.ʁi]) (born Roman Leibovich Kacew; (Note: pronounced [katsɛf]) 21 May [O.S. 8 May] 1914 – 2 December 1980), also known by the pen name Émile Ajar, was a Lithuanian-born French novelist, diplomat, film director, and military aviator. He is the only author to have won the Prix Goncourt twice (once under a pen name). He is considered a major writer of French literature of the second half of the 20th century.

== Early life ==
Gary was born Roman Leibovich Kacew (Yiddish: רומן קצב, romanized: Roman Katsev Russian: Рома́н Ле́йбович Ка́цев, romanized: Roman Leibovich Katsev) in Vilnius (at that time in the Russian Empire). In his books and interviews, he presented many different versions of his parents' origins, ancestry, occupation and his own childhood. His mother, Mina Owczyńska (1879–1941), was a Polish-Jewish actress from Švenčionys (Svintsyán, Święciany) and his father was a businessman named Arje-Lejb Kacew (1883–1942) from Trakai (Troki), also a Lithuanian Jew. The couple divorced in 1925 and Arieh-Leib remarried. Gary later claimed that his actual biological father was the celebrated actor and film star Ivan Mosjoukine, with whom his actress mother had worked and to whom he bore a striking resemblance. Mosjoukine appears in his memoir Promise at Dawn.

Deported to central Russia in 1915, they stayed in Moscow until 1920. In 1923, they returned to Vilnius, then in Poland, where his mother worked as tailor, and in 1926 they moved on to Warsaw. When Gary was fourteen, he and his mother immigrated illegally to Nice, France. Gary studied law, first in Aix-en-Provence and then in Paris. He became a naturalized French citizen in 1935.

== Military service ==
Gary joined the French Air Force in 1938. He learned to pilot an aircraft in Salon-de-Provence and in Avord Air Base, near Bourges. Despite completing all parts of his course successfully, Gary was the only one of almost 300 cadets in his class not to be commissioned as an officer. He believed the military establishment was distrustful of him because he was a foreigner and a Jew. Training on Potez 25 and Goëland Léo-20 aircraft, and with 250 hours flying time, only after three months' delay was he made a sergeant on 1 February 1940.

Lightly wounded on 13 June 1940 in a Bloch MB.210, he was disappointed with the armistice; after hearing General de Gaulle's radio appeal, he decided to go to England. After failed attempts, he flew to Algiers from Saint-Laurent-de-la-Salanque in a Potez. Made adjutant upon joining the Free French and serving on Bristol Blenheims, he saw action across Africa and was promoted to second lieutenant. He returned to England to train on Boston IIIs. On 25 January 1944, his pilot was temporarily blinded, and Gary talked him to the bombing target and back home, the third landing being successful. This and the subsequent BBC interview and Evening Standard newspaper article were an important part of his career. He finished the war as a captain in the London offices of the Free French Air Forces. As a bombardier-observer in the Groupe de bombardement Lorraine (No. 342 Squadron RAF), he took part in over 25 successful sorties, logging over 65 hours of air time. During this time, he changed his name to Romain Gary. He was decorated for his bravery in the war, receiving many medals and honours, including Compagnon de la Libération and commander of the Légion d'honneur.

== Writer ==
In 1945, he published his first novel, Éducation européenne. Immediately following his service in the war, he worked in the French diplomatic service in Bulgaria and Switzerland. In 1952 he became the secretary of the French Delegation to the United Nations. In 1956, he became Consul General in Los Angeles and became acquainted with Hollywood.

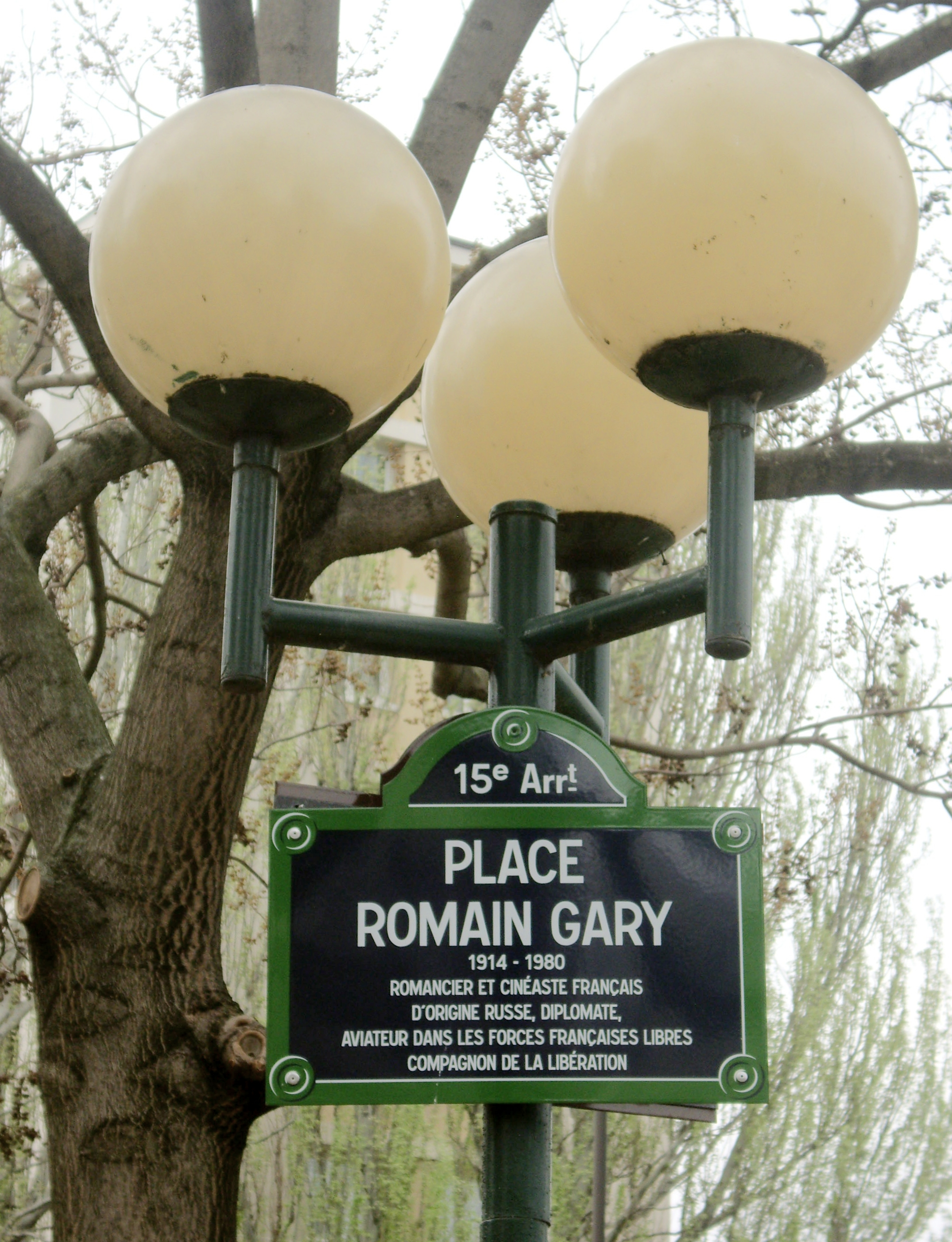
Place Romain-Gary, located in Paris' 15th arrondissement

Gary became one of France's most popular and prolific writers, writing more than 30 novels, essays and memoirs, some of which he wrote under a pseudonym.

He is the only person to win the Prix Goncourt twice. This prize for French language literature is awarded only once to an author. Gary, who had already received the prize in 1956 for Les racines du ciel, published La vie devant soi under the pseudonym Émile Ajar in 1975. The Académie Goncourt awarded the prize to the author of that book without knowing his identity. Gary's cousin's son Paul Pavlowitch posed as the author for a time. Gary later revealed the truth in his posthumous book Vie et mort d'Émile Ajar. Gary also published as Shatan Bogat, René Deville and Fosco Sinibaldi, as well under his birth name Roman Kacew.

In addition to his success as a novelist, he wrote the screenplay for the motion picture The Longest Day and co-wrote and directed the film Kill! Kill! Kill! Kill! (1971), which starred his wife at the time, Jean Seberg. In 1979, he was a member of the jury at the 29th Berlin International Film Festival.

=== As Émile Ajar ===
In a memoir published in 1981, Paul Pavlowitch claimed that Gary also produced several works under the pseudonym Émile Ajar. Gary recruited Pavlowitch – his cousin's son – to portray Ajar in public appearances, allowing Gary to remain unknown as the true producer of the Ajar works, and thus enabling him to win the 1975 Goncourt Prize (a second win in violation of the prize's rules).

Gary also published under the pseudonyms Shatan Bogat and Fosco Sinibaldi.

== Diplomat ==
After the end of the hostilities, Gary began a career as a diplomat in the service of France, in consideration of his contribution to the liberation of the country. In this capacity, he held positions in Bulgaria (1946–1947), Paris (1948–1949), Switzerland (1950–1951), New York (1951–1954) at the Permanent Mission of France to the United Nations. Here, he regularly rubbed shoulders with the Jesuit Teilhard de Chardin, whose personality deeply marked him and inspired him, particularly for the character of Father Tassin in Les Racines du ciel. He was positioned in London 1955, and as Consul General of France in Los Angeles 1956–1960. Back in Paris, he remained unassigned until he was laid off from the Ministry of Foreign Affairs (1961).

== Personal life and final years ==
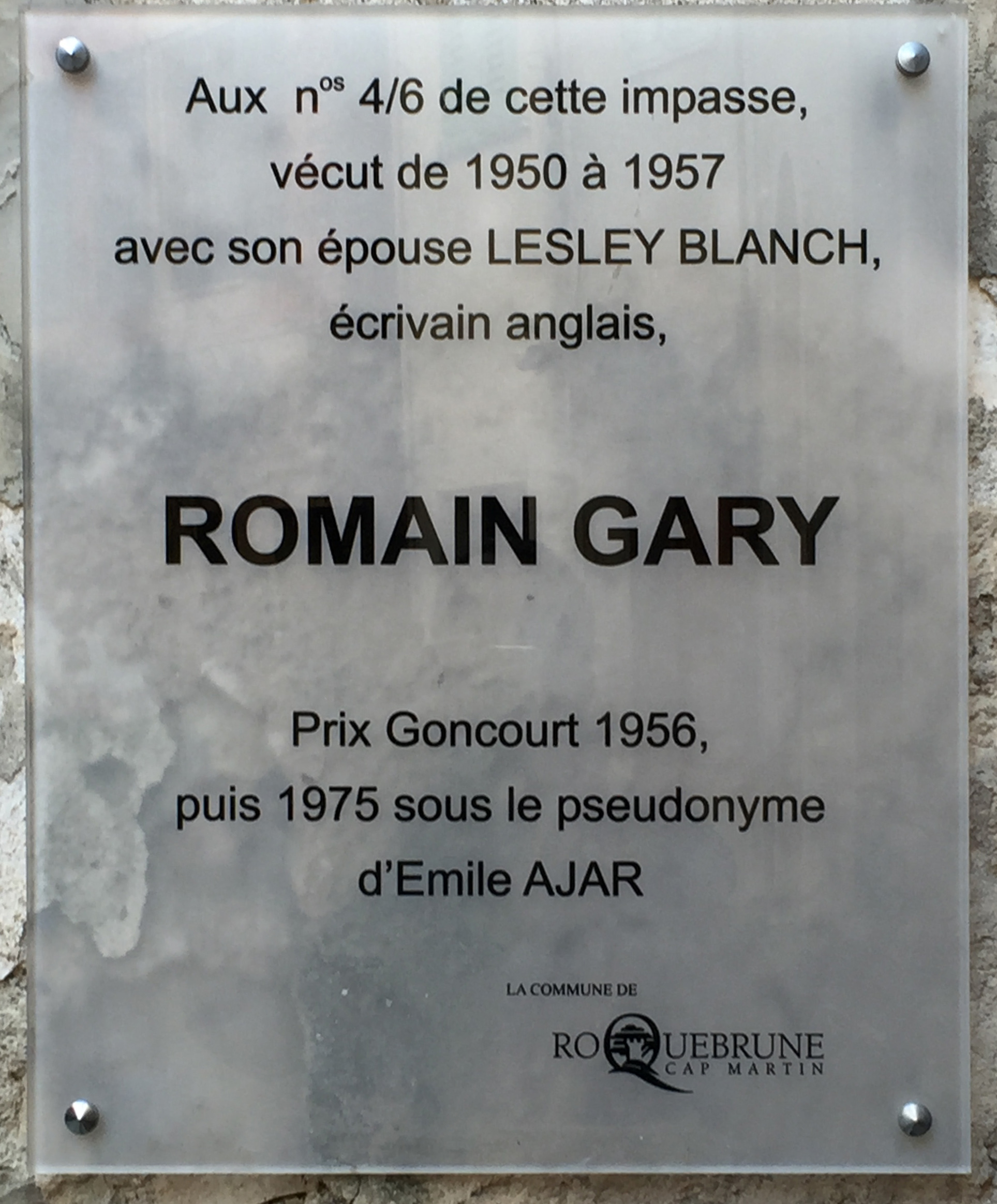
Plaque to Gary and his first wife Lesley Blanch in Roquebrune-Cap-Martin on the Côte d'Azur; they lived there in 1950–57.

Gary's first wife was the British writer, journalist, and Vogue editor Lesley Blanch, author of The Wilder Shores of Love. They married in 1944 and divorced in 1961. From 1962 to 1970, Gary was married to American actress Jean Seberg, with whom he had a son, Alexandre Diego Gary. According to Diego Gary, he was a distant presence as a father: "Even when he was around, my father wasn't there. Obsessed with his work, he used to greet me, but he was elsewhere."

After learning that Jean Seberg had had an affair with Clint Eastwood, Gary challenged him to a duel, but Eastwood declined.

Gary died of a self-inflicted gunshot wound on 2 December 1980 in Paris. He left a note which said that his death had no relation to Seberg's suicide the previous year. He also stated in his note that he was Émile Ajar.

Gary was cremated in Père Lachaise Cemetery and his ashes were scattered in the Mediterranean Sea near Roquebrune-Cap-Martin.

== Legacy ==
The name of Romain Gary was given to a promotion of the École nationale d'administration (2003–2005), the Institut d'études politiques de Lille (2013), the Institut régional d'administration de Lille (2021–2022) and the Institut d'études politiques de Strasbourg (2001–2002), in 2006 at Place Romain-Gary in the 15th arrondissement of Paris and at the Nice Heritage Library. The French Institute in Jerusalem also bears the name of Romain Gary.

On 16 May 2019, his work appeared in two volumes in the Bibliothèque de la Pléiade under the direction of Mireille Sacotte.

In 2007, a statue of Romualdas Kvintas, «The Boy with a Galoche», was unveiled, depicting the 9-year-old little hero of the Promise of Dawn, preparing to eat a shoe to seduce his little neighbor, Valentina. It is placed in Vilnius, in front of the Basanavičius, where the novelist lived.

A plaque to his name is affixed in the Pouillon building of the Faculty of Law and Political Science of Aix-Marseille where he studied.

== Media depictions ==
Gary is played by Yvan Attal in the 2019 American biographical film Seberg.

In 2022, Denis Ménochet portrayed Gary in White Dog (Chien blanc), a film adaptation by Anaïs Barbeau-Lavalette of Gary's 1970 book.

== Honors and awards ==
- Commander of the Order of Legion of Honour
- Order of Liberation
- Croix de guerre 1939-1945 (France)
- Colonial Medal
- Medal for the War Wounded

== Bibliography ==
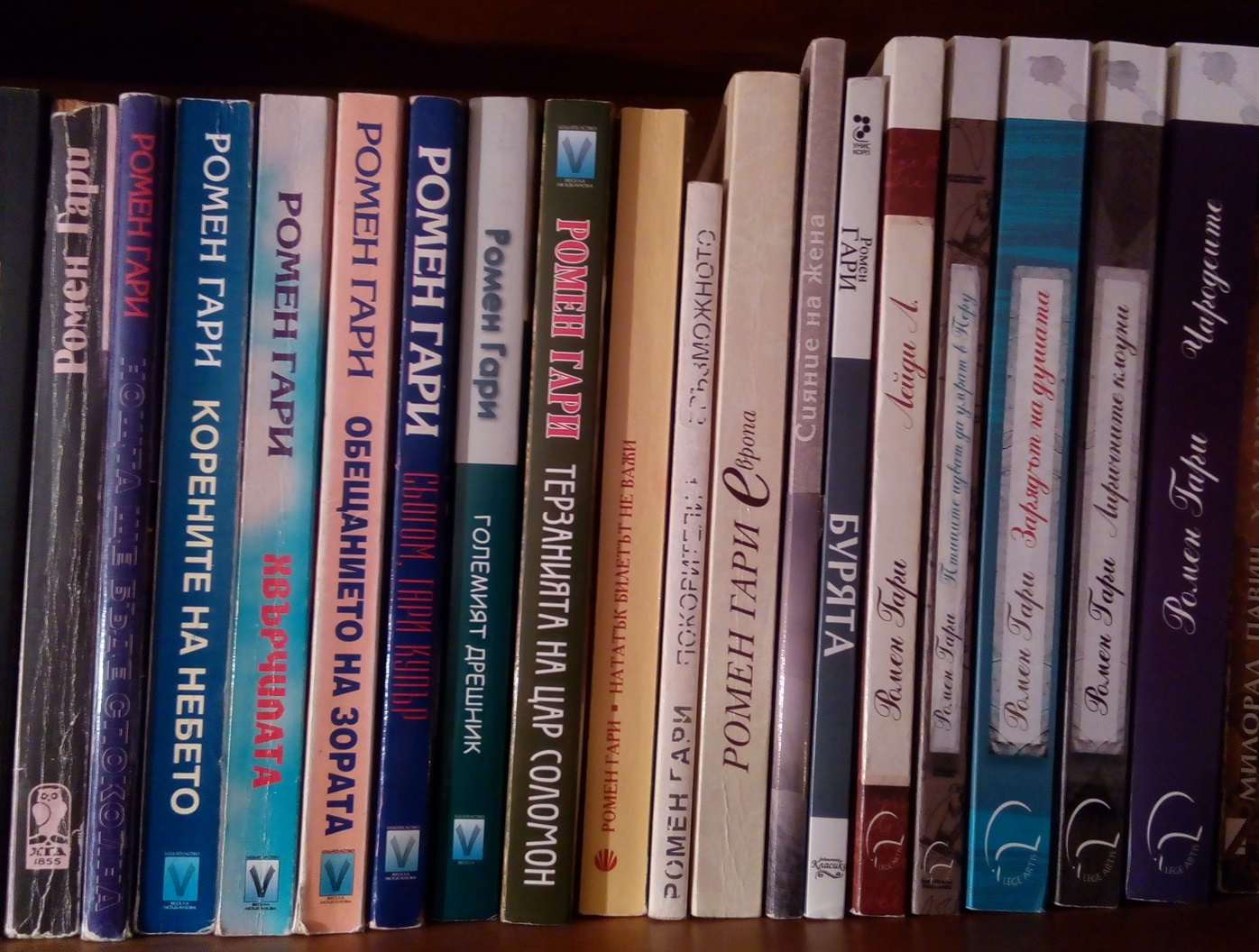
Several Romain Gary works in Bulgarian translations.

=== As Romain Gary ===
- French: Éducation européenne (1945); translated as Forest of Anger
- French: Tulipe (1946); republished and modified in 1970.
- Le Grand Vestiaire (1949); translated as The Company of Men (1950)
- Les Couleurs du jour (1952); translated as The Colors of the Day (1953); filmed as The Man Who Understood Women (1959)
- Les Racines du ciel — 1956 Prix Goncourt; translated as The Roots of Heaven (1957); filmed as The Roots of Heaven (1958)
- Lady L (1958); self-translated and published in French in 1963; filmed as Lady L (1965)
- La Promesse de l'aube (1960); translated as Promise at Dawn (1961); filmed as Promise at Dawn (1970) and Promise at Dawn (2017)
- Johnie Cœur (1961, a theatre adaptation of "L'homme à la colombe")
- Gloire à nos illustres pionniers (1962, short stories); translated as "Hissing Tales" (1964)
- The Ski Bum (1965); self-translated into French as Adieu Gary Cooper (1969)
- Pour Sganarelle (1965, literary essay)
- Les Mangeurs d'étoiles (1966); self-translated into French and first published (in English) as The Talent Scout (1961)
- La Danse de Gengis Cohn (1967); self-translated into English as The Dance of Genghis Cohn
- La Tête coupable (1968); translated as The Guilty Head (1969)
- Chien Blanc (1970); self-translated as White Dog (1970); filmed as White Dog (1982)
- Les Trésors de la mer Rouge (1971)
- Europa (1972); translated in English in 1978.
- The Gasp (1973); self-translated into French as Charge d'âme (1978)
- Les Enchanteurs (1973); translated as The Enchanters (1975)
- La nuit sera calme (1974, interview)
- Au-delà de cette limite votre ticket n'est plus valable (1975); translated as Your Ticket Is No Longer Valid (1977); filmed as Your Ticket Is No Longer Valid (1981)
- Clair de femme (1977); filmed as Womanlight (1979)
- La Bonne Moitié (1979, play)
- Les Clowns lyriques (1979); new version of the 1952 novel, Les Couleurs du jour (The Colors of the Day)
- Les Cerfs-volants (1980); translated as The Kites (2017)
- Vie et Mort d'Émile Ajar (1981, posthumous)
- L'Homme à la colombe (1984, definitive posthumous version)
- L'Affaire homme (2005, articles and interviews)
- L'Orage (2005, short stories and unfinished novels)
- Un humaniste, short story

=== As Émile Ajar ===
- Gros câlin (1974); illustrated by Jean-Michel Folon, filmed as Gros câlin (1979)
- La Vie devant soi — 1975 Prix Goncourt; filmed as Madame Rosa (1977); translated as "Momo" (1978); re-released as The Life Before Us (1986). Filmed as The Life Ahead (2020)
- Pseudo (1976)
- L'Angoisse du roi Salomon (1979); translated as King Solomon (1983).
- Gros câlin – new version including final chapter of the original and never published version.

=== As Fosco Sinibaldi ===
- L'homme à la colombe (1958)

=== As Shatan Bogat ===
- Les Têtes de Stéphanie (1974)

== Filmography ==
=== As screenwriter ===
- 1958: The Roots of Heaven
- 1962: The Longest Day
- 1978: La vie devant soi

=== As actor ===
- 1936: Nitchevo – Le jeune homme au bastingage
- 1967: The Road to Corinth – (uncredited) (final film role)

=== As director ===
- 1968: Birds in Peru (Birds in Peru) starring Jean Seberg
- 1971: Kill! Kill! Kill! Kill! also starring Jean Seberg
