= Promise at Dawn (1970 film) =

1970 American film by Jules Dassin

- Film poster
- Directed by: Jules Dassin
- Written by: Jules Dassin; Romain Gary (novel); Andrew Sarris; Samuel A. Taylor (play)
- Produced by: Jules Dassin
- Starring: Melina Mercouri; Assi Dayan
- Cinematography: Jean Badal
- Edited by: Robert Lawrence
- Music by: Georges Delerue
- Production company: Nathalie Productions
- Distributed by: AVCO Embassy Pictures
- Release dates: November 25, 1970 (Paris); December 16, 1970 (Los Angeles)
- Running time: 99 minutes
- Country: United States
- Language: English

Promise at Dawn (French: La Promesse de l'aube) is a 1970 American drama film directed by Jules Dassin and starring Melina Mercouri, Dassin's wife. It is based on the 1960 novel Promise at Dawn (French: La Promesse de l'aube) by Romain Gary and the subsequent play by Samuel A. Taylor.

== Plot ==
The film follows author Romain Gary as he recalls his growing up with his Lithuanian-born mother. The two leave Vilnius, Lithuania for France, where they settle in Paris. As twenty years pass, they encounter social change, age, different convictions, poverty and the slow approach of World War II.

== Cast ==
- Melina Mercouri as Nina Kacew
- Assi Dayan as Romain age 25
- Didier Haudepin as Romain age 15
- François Raffoul as Romain age 9
- Despo Diamantidou as Aniela (as Despo)
- Jean Martin as Igor Igorevitch
- Fernand Gravey as Jean-Michel Serusier
- Jacqueline Porel as Madame Mailer
- Elspeth March as Fat Woman
- Maria Machado as Nathalie Lissenko
- Julie Dassin as Romain's Friend
- René Clermont as Mr. Piekielny
- Carole Cole as Louison
- Marina Nestora as Mariette
- Audrey Berindey as Valentine Mailer
- Jacqueline Duc as Madame de Rare
- Muni as Angélique
- Thérèse Thoreaux as Silent Film Heroine
- Jules Dassin as Ivan Mosjukine
- Dennis Berry as Belle Gueule
- Rufus as The Violin Teacher
- Katia Tchenko as The actress

== Production ==
The film was shot in Nice, Paris and the USSR. Dassin broke both his legs after falling over in October 1969 after three days of filming in Nice.

Avco Embassy president Joseph E. Levine filmed a cameo for the film.
