= The Roots of Heaven (novel) =

1956 novel by Romain Gary

- 1956 French edition
- Author: Romain Gary
- Original title: Les Racines du ciel
- Translator: Jonathan Griffin
- Language: French
- Set in: French Equatorial Africa, 1955
- Publisher: Éditions Gallimard
- Publication date: 5 October 1956
- Publication place: France
- English publication date: 1958
- Pages: 510
- Dewey Decimal: 843.9

The Roots of Heaven (French: Les Racines du ciel) is a 1956 novel by the Lithuanian-born French writer and World War II aviator, Romain Gary (born Roman Kacew). It received the Prix Goncourt for fiction. It was translated into English in 1957.

== Synopsis ==
The book takes place in French Equatorial Africa. Morel, a crusading environmentalist, labors to preserve elephants from extinction. He is assisted in the task by Minna, a nightclub hostess, and Forsythe, a disgraced American military officer in search of redemption. The story is a metaphor for the quest for salvation for all humanity.

== Themes ==
The main character, Morel, wants to save the elephants: they are cumbersome, but if we eliminate them for that reason, we will end up eliminating everything that some might consider cumbersome, even freedom. He sees defending elephants as a way of saving what remains of humanity in man in the face of modern barbarism: that of hunting, profit, colonisation, and the destruction of ecosystems (e.g. coral reefs and agricultural soils). True emancipation comes through reconnecting with the ‘roots of heaven’, that is, with something higher, purer: a vision of man reconciled with nature, respectful of life, and imbued with authentic dignity.

Most, if not all, of the other characters in the novel are also alone. However, those who share Morel's ideal or follow him for whatever reason gather around him, come together around him, like branches growing from a tree or "roots of the sky".

Romain Gary's quest for dignity is an all-encompassing project spanning nature, politics, religion (the search for God, for some secondary characters), and science (against cancer; against weapons of mass destruction). There is a very strong connection to the Second World War and concentration camps. Morel was a member of the Resistance and was deported; Orsini experienced the camps; Minna was humiliated in Germany; the world still bears the scars of the Holocaust, racism, and mass cruelty. The central question of the novel is how can man remain dignified—and help others remain dignified—in a world that denies dignity. The episode of the fight for the beetles, when Morel is in a German camp, illustrates this question. By helping the beetles back on their feet, Morel and his friends make ‘a proclamation of dignity, unacceptable among men reduced to nothing’ in the eyes of the Germans.

At the same time, Waïtari is an African man who wants to free Africa, but he is too assimilated (he studied in France) and is cut off from his people and his roots. He is a nationalist, when the word ‘nation’ does not even exist in the local languages - Waïtari's conclusion is to insist on developing the use of French. He tells himself that ‘if we had to wait for the national aspirations of the Oulés, we might as well speak for posterity, that is to say, renounce any personal destiny’. He will only perpetuate the logic of domination in other forms, up to and including totalitarianism. He criticises Morel's idealism: in his mind, he contrasts universal ideals (the beauty of elephants and ivory in the eyes of Europeans) with respect for local realities (the hunger for meat). But Waïtari's "realism" merely masks (in his own eyes) the personal ambition of a man shaped by a European education that distances him from his cultural roots. His vision serves the power he seeks to embody, while Morel's idealism serves humanity.

Orsini is plagued by fear and feelings of powerlessness and inferiority. A former resistance fighter, he was broken by war and has lost his faith in humanity. Through hunting, he attempts to transform his internal anxiety into an external target that he can destroy. When he confronts the animals, his anxiety finally becomes something tangible that can be killed. However, his sense of relief is only temporary.

He is one of those people who reassure themselves by rejecting any lofty conception of human dignity : he develops a hatred for Morel and other idealists. "In order for him to reach the lowest common denominator of humanity, it had to be at his level — not too high. That is undoubtedly why he hated anything that could give a lofty or noble idea of the human condition." Orsini displays a 'wounded pettiness' and harbours a fierce hatred for stubborn people like Morel. He would rather lower the ideal than face his own moral failure.

== Adaptation ==
John Huston directed and Darryl Zanuck produced a 1958 Hollywood film of the same title.

== See also ==
- 1956 in literature
- 20th-century French literature
