= Moonstone =

Moonstone may refer to:

- Moonstone (gemstone), a sodium potassium aluminium silicate
- Moonstone as belomorite, one of the varieties of plagioclase
- Moon rock, a rock which was once part of the Moon

== Arts and entertainment ==
=== Fictional entities ===
- Moonstone, Colorado, a town in The Song of the Lark by Willa Cather
- Moonstone (comics), the name of two Marvel Comics universe characters
- Moonstone, a plot element in season 2 of The Vampire Diaries
- Moonstone Opal, a plot element in Tangled The Series
- Moonstone, a setting in Erin Hunter's Warriors story arc
- Moonstone, an artifact in the Lone Wolf gamebooks

=== Film and television ===
- The Moonstone (1909 film), by William Nicholas Selig, probably lost
- The Moonstone (1915 film), by Frank Hall Crane
- The Moonstone (1934 film), by Reginald Barker
- The Moonstone (1996 film), a TV film
- The Moonstone (1959 TV series), a British miniseries
- The Moonstone (1972 TV series), a British miniseries
- The Moonstone (2016 TV series), a British miniseries
- "Moonstone" (The Outer Limits), a 1964 episode

=== Other uses in arts and entertainment ===
- The Moonstone, an 1868 book by Wilkie Collins
- "Moonstone", a song by Cat Stevens from the 1967 album New Masters
- Moonstone: A Hard Days Knight, a 1991 computer game
- The Moonstones, a Sri Lankan band
- Moonstone Island, a 2023 video game by Studio Supersoft

== Businesses ==
- Moonstone (company), a Japanese visual novel studio
- Moonstone (imprint), an imprint of HarperCollins
- Moonstone Books, an American publisher

== Places ==
- Moonstone, Ontario, Canada
  - Mount St. Louis Moonstone, a ski resort
- Moonstone, California, U.S.
- Moonstone Beach, a former tourist attraction in Redondo Beach, California, U.S.
- Moonstone Beach, a beach in Cambria, California, U.S.

== Other uses ==
- Moonstone (horse), an Irish Thoroughbred racehorse and broodmare
- Lunar Society Moonstones, a set of sandstone memorials to members of the Lunar Society
- USS Moonstone (PYc-9), a WWII U.S. Navy patrol yacht
- HMS Moonstone (T90), a WWII British Royal Navy armed trawler
- Moonstone Records, a record label
- Pachyphytum oviferum, succulent plant known as moonstone
- Sandakada pahana or Moonstone, carved semi-circular stone slabs in Sri Lanka
- Moonstone, UK National Lottery number selection machine
- Moonstone, a 1991 Performing Arts Festival
- Moonstones, distinctively Latter Day Saint motifs in Nauvoo Temple
- La pietra lunare, a 1939 novel by the Italian writer Tommaso Landolfi, which means "The Moonstone" in Italian
