= Ezra Jennings =

Fictional character from novel The Moonstone

Ezra Jennings is a character, and part-narrator, in Wilkie Collins' 1868 novel The Moonstone. Ill-favoured, and of ill repute, he is ultimately responsible for solving the mystery of the Moonstone's theft, and so for reuniting the hero with the heroine, Rachel Verinder.

== Origins ==
Walking with Dickens in the Lake District, Collins sprained his ankle, and was much struck by the appearance of the doctor's assistant treating him: "a startling object to look at, with his colourless face, his sunken cheeks, his wild black eyes, and his long black hair". He used him as the basis for a series of characters, culminating in Ezra Jennings.

== Characteristics ==
Where the whiter-than-white Godfrey Ablewhite conceals an evil core, the ugly Jennings hides by contrast a heart of gold. A liminal figure, spanning East and West, male and female - "some men are born with female constitutions - and I am one of them" - Jennings is able to use his creative sensitivity to bring the unconscious theft of the stone back into social consciousness.

As an opium-user, and a cultural figure on the margins of Victorian respectability, Jennings is the figure in the novel who comes closest to the author himself. Jennings is very depressed, believing death will be an escape and that the complete oblivion of memory is the key to happiness; and the opium which used to be successful, along with the disease he has, are fast killing him.

A queer reading of the text provides the view that Ezra Jennings was intended as a homosexual character. In his journal, he recounts a possibly homoerotic interest in Franklin Blake: "What is the secret of the attraction that there is for me in this man?". As an example of the queer 'Other', he is given a unique position within the narrative as the only figure able to solve both the mystery of the Moonstone and the marriage problem between Rachel Verinder and Franklin Blake. He is also the only figure who is able to record events in his journal in real time, giving him the twin positions of both the external observer and also the voice of truth. It is because of his existence outside the typical Victorian heterosexual ideal that he is able to fulfil these roles.

== Portrayals ==
Although Ezra Jennings plays a crucial role in the denouement of the novel, his character is not present in the 1915 film version.

- He is played by Olaf Hytten in The Moonstone (1934). In this adaptation, his character is conflated with Dr Candy
- In the 1959 TV series he is played by Philip Latham
- He is played by Christopher Hancock in the 1972 TV series
- Anton Lesser plays the character in the 1996 film adaptation
- In the 2016 TV series The Moonstone, he is played by Trevor Fox

== See also ==
- Armadale
- Hybridity
- Psychological splitting
