= The Moonstone (1972 TV series) =

- Genre: Mystery
- Based on: The Moonstone by Wilkie Collins
- Written by: Hugh Leonard
- Directed by: Paddy Russell
- Starring: Vivien Heilbron; Robin Ellis; Basil Dignam; Martin Jarvis; Anna Cropper; Maureen Morris; Madhav Sharma; Kathleen Byron; Peter Sallis
- Country of origin: United Kingdom
- Original language: English
- No. of series: 1
- No. of episodes: 5

Production
- Producer: John McRae
- Running time: 70 minutes
- Production company: BBC

Original release
- Network: BBC One
- Release: 16 January – 13 February 1972

The Moonstone is a British mystery television series adapted from the 1868 novel The Moonstone by Wilkie Collins. It aired on BBC 1 in five episodes between 16 January and 13 February 1972. It subsequently aired in America on PBS-TV's Masterpiece Theatre between 10 December 1972 and 7 January 1973.

== Cast ==
- Vivien Heilbron as Rachel Verinder
- Robin Ellis as Franklin Blake
- Kathleen Byron as Lady Verinder
- Basil Dignam as Gabriel Betteredge
- Martin Jarvis as Godfrey Ablewhite
- Anna Cropper as Rosanna Spearman
- John Welsh as Sergeant Cuff
- Peter Sallis as Mr Bruff
- Christopher Hancock as Ezra Jennings
- Brian Murphy as Septimus Luker
- Maureen Morris as Penelope Betteredge
- Madhav Sharma as Indian
- Bell McCallum as Nancy
- Michael Gover as Superintendent Seegrave
- Philip Ray as Dr Candy
- Roy Macready as Tomlinson
- Tony Maiden as Conjuror's Boy
- Ali Baba as Indian Conjuror
- Azad Ali as Indian Conjuror
- Cynthia Etherington as Miss Clack
- Brian Badcoe as Mr Murthwaite
- Douglas Mann as Gooseberry
- Dona Martin as Lucy Yolland
- Sheila Keith as Mrs Yolland
- Norman Claridge as Dr Richardson
- Timothy Craven as Chemist
- Colin Baker as John Herncastle
- Reginald Jessup as Purser
- Norman Mitchell as Mr Ablewhite
- Mary Barclay as Mrs Ablewhite
- Billy Cornelius as Landlord
- Stephen Rea as Major Frayne
- Derek Chafer as Sergeant
- Julie May as Cuff's Housekeeper
- David Simeon as Mechanic
- Pat Gorman as Baker, Plain Clothes Man
- Albert Moses as Treasury Guard
- Marguerite Young as Mrs Threadgall
- Sherrie Hewson as Charity Ablewhite
- Georgina Simpson as Grace Ablewhite

== Reception ==
The series was well received by critics. In The New York Times, Howard Thompson called it "typically smooth, restrained, well-played, and in lovely, subdued colour".

== Bibliography ==
- Baskin, Ellen. Serials on British Television, 1950-1994. Scolar Press, 1996.
