= The Moonstone (2016 TV series) =

Daytime drama series

- Genre: Drama
- Based on: The Moonstone by Wilkie Collins
- Written by: Rachael Flowerday; Sasha Hails
- Starring: Josh Silver (author); John Thomson; Terenia Edwards
- Composer: Patrick Neil Doyle
- Country of origin: United Kingdom
- Original language: English
- No. of series: 1
- No. of episodes: 5

Production
- Executive producers: Jo Sargent; John Yorke; Dan McGolpin
- Producer: Joanna Hanley
- Cinematography: Stephen Murphy
- Running time: 45 minutes
- Production company: King Bert Productions

Original release
- Network: BBC One
- Release: 31 October – 4 November 2016

The Moonstone is a British five-part drama produced by King Bert Productions for BBC One. It is an adaptation of the Wilkie Collins 1868 novel of the same name described by T.S. Eliot as the first and greatest of English detective novels. It stars Josh Silver and John Thomson.

== Plot ==
Rachel Verinder, a young English woman, inherits a large Indian diamond on her eighteenth birthday. It is a legacy from her uncle, a corrupt British army officer who served in India. The diamond is of great religious significance as well as being extremely valuable, and three Hindu priests have dedicated their lives to recovering it. Rachel's eighteenth birthday is celebrated with a large party, at which the guests include her cousin Franklin Blake. She wears the Moonstone on her dress that evening for all to see, including some Indian jugglers who have called at the house. Later that night, the diamond is stolen from Rachel's bedroom, and a period of turmoil, unhappiness, misunderstandings and ill-luck ensues in a complex plot to explain the theft, identify the thief, trace the stone and recover it.

== Cast and characters ==
- David Calder as Mr Bruff
- Stewart Clarke as Godfrey Ablewhite
- Terenia Edwards as Rachel Verinder
- Sarah Hadland as Miss Clack
- Josh Silver as Franklin Blake
- John Thomson as Detective Sergeant Cuff
- Leo Wringer as Gabriel Betteredge
- Nisa Cole as Penelope Betteredge
- Sophie Ward as Lady Verinder
- Guy Henry as Mr Murthwaite
- Jane McGrath as Roseanna Spearman
- Sophie Stone as Lucy Yolland
- Flaminia Cinque as Italian Mother
- Jeremy Swift as Dr Candy
- Simon Schatzberger as Septimus Luker
- Trevor Fox as Dr Ezra Jennings
- Jag Sanghera as Guardian

== Episodes ==
No. in series	Title	Directed by	Written by	Original release date	UK viewers (millions)
1	"Episode 1"	Lisa Mulcahy	Rachel Flowerday and Sasha Hails	31 October 2016	N/A
Franklin Blake returns to England for his father's funeral and to solve the theft of The Moonstone stolen the year before on his cousin Rachel's 18th birthday. In love with Rachel she disowns her own feeling for him when his lies over his debts come to light. He seeks out the Verinder family butler, Gabriel Betteredge to relate the events up to the night the Moonstone went missing. A night Dr Candy gave him a sleeping draught.
2	"Episode 2"	Lisa Mulcahy	Rachel Flowerday and Sasha Hails	1 November 2016	N/A
Sergeant Cuff returns to relate his investigation to Blake. He reports on Rachael Verinder's unwillingness to co-operate with the police; her maid Roseanna Spearman known to him as a thief with access to a jewel broker in London. A clue of smeared paint on a nightgown. How his investigation falls apart as first Godfrey Ablewhite leaves for London followed by the uncooperative Rachel. Blake unable to placate Rachel leaves for the continent. How he and Gabriel search for Spearman near quicksands and fail to find her.
3	"Episode 3"	Lisa Mulcahy	Rachel Flowerday and Sasha Hails	2 November 2016	N/A
Miss Clack arrives in Yorkshire to relate events following the theft of the Moonstone. How Godfrey Ablewhite after meeting jewel broker Septimus Luker that they were both kidnapped by Indian men. How Rachel knew who stole the Moonstone and her regret on her mother's deathbed that she had kept the secret from her. How Rachel vindicated Godfrey and accepting his proposal of marriage despite not loving him. Franklin is told Godfrey, before his proposal had seen Rachel's mother's will and is determined to stop the marriage. A secret letter of Roseanna Spearman comes to light revealing the whereabouts of a casket hidden in the quicksands.
4	"Episode 4"	Lisa Mulcahy	Rachel Flowerday and Sasha Hails	3 November 2016	N/A
Recovering the casket the contents of which was Franklin's nightgown smeared with paint and a letter professing her love for him. Mr Bruff, Franklin's solicitor, informs Rachel of Godfrey Ablewhite's motives and she deceives Godfrey into breaking their engagement. Bruff engineers a meeting between Franklin and Rachel, at which she tells him she saw him enter her bedroom and take the Moonstone and only her love for him prevented her exposing him. Shocked at this revelation Franklin departs.
5	"Episode 5"	Lisa Mulcahy	Rachel Flowerday and Sasha Hails	4 November 2016	N/A
Accused of theft by the woman he loves, Franklin returns to Yorkshire to recreate the events of a year ago. Dr Candy is dead and his assistant Dr Ezra Jennings reveals he was given laudanum as a sleeping draught; a drug that he himself is addicted to. The re-enactment proved Franklin took the Moonstone but passed the diamond on. Returning to London a watch is kept on jewel broker Septimus Luker which leads to a number of suspects each of whom is followed. Godfrey Abelwhite is found dead smothered on the bed, the Moonstone gone.

== Production ==
In July 2016, a new adaptation of The Moonstone was announced, starring John Thomson as Sergeant Cuff and Sarah Hadland as Drusilla Clack. Billed as an afternoon drama, it was scheduled at an earlier time to appeal to a younger audience as part of the BBC's #LoveToRead initiative. The programme aired on five consecutive days between 31 October and 4 November 2016.

== Reception ==
Jasper Rees of The Daily Telegraph gave the show a positive review, highlighting the way in which each episode focused on a different character and complimenting Wringer and Hadland's performances. "This charming Moonstone should prove a great gateway drug for crime drama, costume drama and for Collins himself."
