= The Moonstone (1996 film) =

- Genre: Mystery, Period drama
- Based on: The Moonstone by Wilkie Collins
- Written by: Kevin Elyot
- Directed by: Robert Bierman
- Starring: Greg Wise; Keeley Hawes; Peter Vaughan; Antony Sher
- Music by: Rick Wentworth
- Countries of origin: United States; United Kingdom
- Original language: English
- No. of series: 1
- No. of episodes: 2

Production
- Executive producers: George Faber; Rebecca Eaton
- Producer: Chris Parr
- Cinematography: John Daly
- Running time: 120 minutes
- Production companies: BBC; WGBH Boston

Original release
- Network: BBC2
- Release: 29 December – 30 December 1996
- Network: PBS
- Release: 2 November 1997

The Moonstone is a television drama series based on the 1868 novel The Moonstone by Wilkie Collins. It was broadcast in two parts in 1996.

== Cast ==
- Greg Wise as Franklin Blake
- Keeley Hawes as Rachel Verinder
- Terrence Hardiman as Col. Sir John Hardcastle
- Peter Vaughan as Gabriel Betterege
- Patricia Hodge as Lady Julia Verinder
- Antony Sher as Sergeant Cuff
- Anton Lesser as Ezra Jennings
- Paul Brooke as Dr. Candy
- Scott Handy as Godfrey Ablewhite
- Lesley Sharp as Rosanna Spearman
- Kacey Ainsworth as Drusilla Clack
- Peter Jeffrey as Mr Bruff
