= The Moonstone (1934 film) =

- Theatrical release poster
- Directed by: Reginald Barker
- Written by: Adele Buffington
- Based on: The Moonstone by Wilkie Collins
- Produced by: Paul Malvern
- Starring: David Manners; Phyllis Barry
- Cinematography: Robert H. Planck
- Edited by: Jack Ogilvie; Carl Pierson
- Music by: Abe Meyer
- Production company: Monogram Pictures
- Distributed by: Monogram Pictures
- Release date: 1934
- Running time: 62 minutes
- Country: United States
- Language: English

The Moonstone is a 1934 American mystery film directed by Reginald Barker and starring David Manners, Phyllis Barry, Gustav von Seyffertitz and Jameson Thomas. It is an adaptation of the 1868 novel The Moonstone by Wilkie Collins. The film retains the book's British location, but uses a contemporary 1930s setting rather than the Victorian era of the original. It is one of three film versions of the novel, which include silent versions in 1915 and 1909, although a number of television and radio adaptations have been made.

== Plot summary ==
As with the book, the film is based around the Herncastle Moonstone, a valuable diamond from India. The plot differs from the original on several particulars, however. Inspector Cuff is commissioned by Scotland Yard to ensure that the Moonstone, which has just arrived in the country, is kept safe. The Moonstone is in the possession of Franklin Blake, who arrives at the Vandier Manor to deliver the jewel to his fiancée Ann Verinder. He is accompanied by his Hindu servant Yandoo, who is an original character for the film. Anne places the diamond under her pillow; as she sleeps, it is stolen.

Inspector Cuff arrives and begins to interrogate the various suspects. Differences from the book include changing the gender of Gabriel Betteredge and turning Godfrey Ablewhite into an antiquarian book collector. Sir John Verinder, an amalgamation of the book's Lady Verinder and Doctor Candy, eventually reveals that he had drugged Blake's drink on the night of the theft. When Cuff arranges to repeat this incident, Blake's sleepwalking reveals that he had been intercepted by Godfrey Ablewhite. Travelling to London, Cuff is able to arrest Ablewhite as he attempts to sell the diamond.

== Cast ==
- David Manners as Franklyn Blake
- Phyllis Barry as Ann Verinder
- Gustav von Seyffertitz as Carl Von Lucker
- Jameson Thomas as Godfrey Ablewhite
- Herbert Bunston as Sir John Verinder
- Charles Irwin as Inspector Cuff
- Elspeth Dudgeon as Betteredge, Housekeeper
- John Davidson as Yandoo
- Claude King as Sir Basil Wynard
- Olaf Hytten as Dr. Ezra Jennings
- Evalyn Bostock as Roseanna Spearman, Maid
- Fred Walton as Henry the Butler
- John Power as The Driver
- Harold Entwistle as Sutter
- A.C. Henderson as Robbin

Lobby card

== Production ==
The film was made by Monogram Studios, one of the smaller Hollywood outfits often known collectively as Poverty Row. The adaptation of a prestigious British Victorian novel marked a break from their usual films which were generally cheaply made American-set Westerns. To fit the story into a limited running time, large amounts of the original novel are dropped from the adaptation.

== Bibliography ==
- Reid, John H. B Movies, Bad Movies, Good Movies. Lulu Press, 2004.
