= Anton Lesser =

English actor (born 1952)

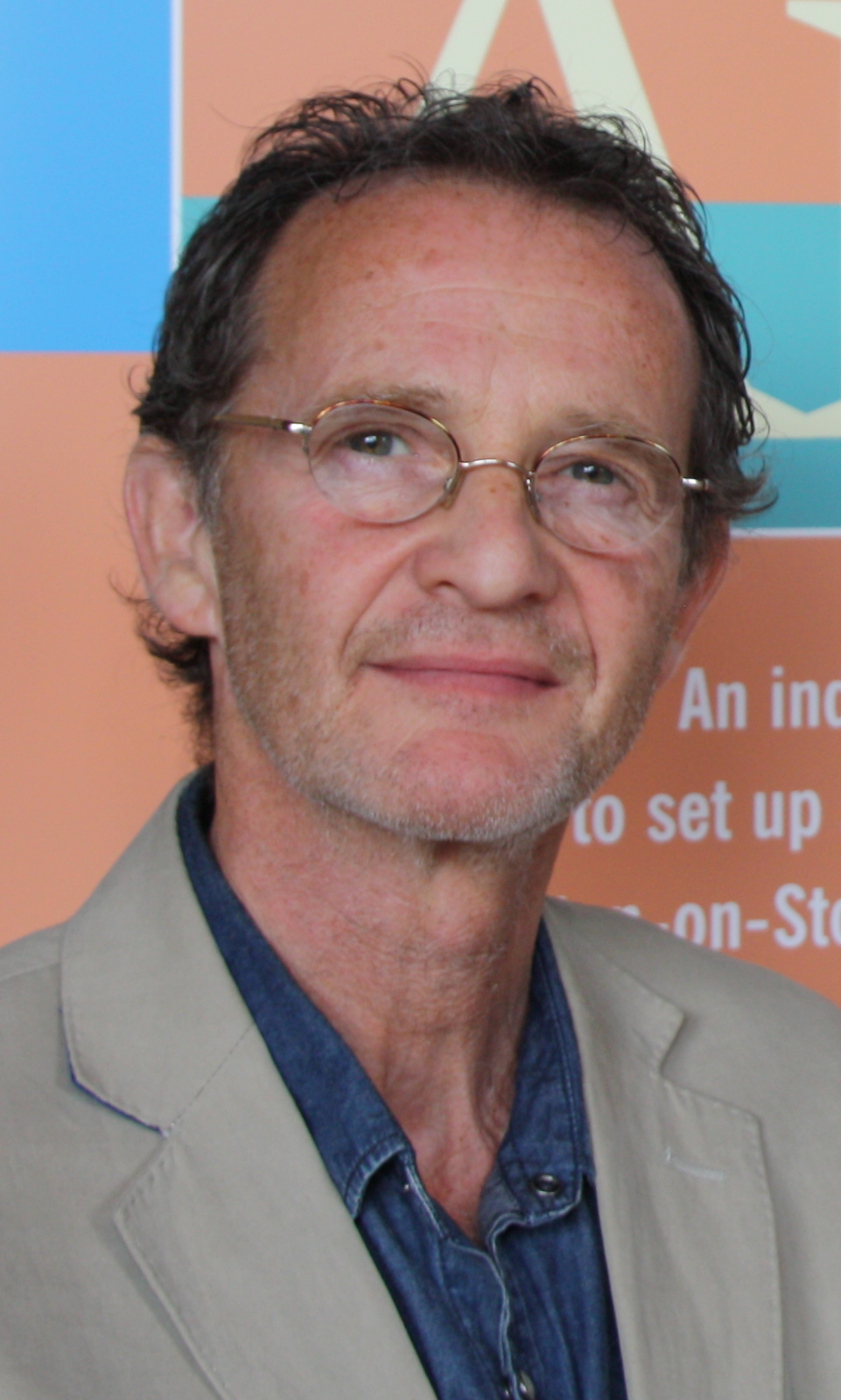
- Lesser in June 2011
- Born: 14 February 1952 (age 74); Birmingham, England, United Kingdom
- Education: University of Liverpool; Royal Academy of Dramatic Art
- Occupation: Actor
- Years active: 1979–present
- Spouse: Madeleine Lesser
- Children: 2

Anton Lesser (born 14 February 1952) is a British actor. He is known for his roles as Qyburn in the HBO series Game of Thrones, Harold Macmillan in The Crown, Clement Attlee in A United Kingdom, Chief Superintendent Bright in Endeavour, and Major Lio Partagaz in Andor. An associate of the Royal Shakespeare Company, he has performed numerous Shakespearean roles on stage and television.

== Early life ==
Anton Lesser was born in Birmingham on 14 February 1952, the son of David Lesser and his wife Amelia Cohen. He is from a Jewish background.

He was educated at Moseley Grammar School and at the University of Liverpool, where he earned a degree in architecture in 1973.

Lesser went to the Royal Academy of Dramatic Art from 1974 until 1976, and, upon graduation in 1977, was awarded the Bancroft Gold Medal as the most promising actor of his year. His final performance there was as Gethin Price in Comedians by Trevor Griffiths.

== Career ==
Lesser was spotted in Comedians and offered a contract by the casting director for the Royal Shakespeare Company (RSC).

As an associate artist with the RSC, Lesser played many of Shakespeare's great roles. In the BBC Television Shakespeare productions, he was Troilus (Troilus and Cressida), Edgar (King Lear), and Feste (Twelfth Night). On stage, he has portrayed Romeo (a titular character in his play), Prince Hamlet (the titular character of his play), Brutus (Julius Caesar), Petruchio (The Taming of the Shrew), Richard III (the titular character of his play), and others.

When he moved to London, the reviews were less flattering than he had become accustomed to at the RSC. However, he continued to win roles on stage, including as Stanley in Harold Pinter's The Birthday Party, Petruchio in The Taming of the Shrew, Rover in Wild Oats and Brutus in Deborah Warner's Julius Caesar in 2005.

Lesser is a frequent radio contributor and played the title role in the BBC Radio adaptations of the first five Marcus Didius Falco mysteries by Lindsey Davis. He has also recorded many audiobooks, including much of the work of Charles Dickens. Lesser's recording of Great Expectations won him a Talkie Award. Other books range from John Milton's Paradise Lost, Homer and Rumi to contemporary novels by Robert Harris (Fatherland) and Philip Pullman. For two months in 2013, Lesser was a regular cast member playing Robin Carrow in Ambridge Extra, a BBC Radio 4 Extra spin-off from the BBC Radio 4 drama The Archers.

In 2013, during the third season of the HBO Max series Game of Thrones, Lesser began playing the recurring role of Qyburn, an enigmatic mad scientist who served as part of the retinue of Cersei Lannister (Lena Headey). Qyburn, and Lesser's portrayal of him, were popular with fans, particularly as the series went on and the character appeared more frequently and had greater influence over the narrative. The Ringer described him as "the last curious man in Westeros" and noted that the character "refuses to seem like a MacGuffin, despite totally being one." The character returned across the remainder of the series run until the penultimate episode in 2019; Qyburn was one of the characters who perished in the episode, which led to many fans producing memes about his abrupt death.

From 2013, Lesser also played Chief Superintendent Bright in the TV series Endeavour.

Lesser portrayed Thomas More in the BBC mini-series Wolf Hall, and received a nomination for the British Academy Television Award for Best Supporting Actor for his performance.

In 2022, Lesser played Major Lio Partagaz, a supporting antagonist in the Star Wars spinoff Andor. His performance of Partagaz, a ranking member of the Empire's intelligence agency, the Imperial Security Bureau, was noted by critics. Digital Spy commented that Lesser delivered dialogue on Imperial bureaucracy with "powerful coolness."

In July 2025, it was announced that he would play the role of Garrick Ollivander in the upcoming Harry Potter TV series.

== Acting credits ==
=== Film ===
Filmography—sortable
Year	Title	Role	Notes
1982	The Missionary	Young Man	
1985	The Assam Garden	Mr Sutton	
1997	FairyTale: A True Story	Wounded Corporal	
2000	Esther Kahn	Sean	
2001	Charlotte Gray	Monsieur Renech	
2003	Imagining Argentina	General Guzmán	
2003	Y Mabinogi	Teyrnon	Voice role
2005	River Queen	Major Baine	
2006	Miss Potter	Harold Warne	
2011	Pirates of the Caribbean: On Stranger Tides	Lord John Carteret	
2011	The Lady	Professor Finnis	
2011	Flutter	Bruno	
2012	The Scapegoat	Father McReady	
2014	Closer to the Moon	Comrade Holban	
2016	A United Kingdom	Prime Minister Attlee	
2016	Allied	Emmanuel Lombard	
2016	The Exception	General Falkenberg	
2017	On Chesil Beach	Reverend Woollett	
2017	Disobedience	Rav Krushka	
2020	The Courier	Bertrand	
2020	Kindred	Dr Richards	
2021	Benediction	Stephen Tennant (Older)	
2025	The World Will Tremble	Rabbi Schulman	
TBA	Santo Subito!	Father Mattew	Post-production

=== Television ===
Television roles by year—sortable
Year	Title	Role	Notes
1981	The Cherry Orchard	Trofimov	Television film
1982	Crown Court	John Peat	3 episodes
1983	Good and Bad at Games	Cox	Television film
1984	Sakharov	Valery Chalidze	Television film
1984	Freud	Wilhelm Fliess	Miniseries, 5 episodes
1985	Anna of the Five Towns	Willie Price	Miniseries, 3 episodes
1987	Great Performances	Robber	Episode: "Monsignor Quixote"
1988	Twelfth Night, or What You Will	Feste	Television film
1988	Screen Two	Stanley Spencer	Episode: "Stanley"
1988	The Play on One	Vincenzo	Episode: "Airbase"
1989	Murderers Among Us: The Simon Wiesenthal Story	Karl	Television film
1990	ScreenPlay	Robert Cecil	Episode: "Traitors"
1991	The Strauss Dynasty	Gustav Levi	Miniseries, 8 episodes
1994	Guinevere	Envoy	Television film
1994	Shakespeare: The Animated Tales	Leontes	Voice role, 1 episode: "The Winter's Tale"
1995	The Politician's Wife	Mark Hollister	Miniseries, 3 episodes
1995	Bugs	Patrick Marcel	Episode: "Pulse"
1995	Moses	Eliav	Miniseries, 2 episodes
1996	Sharman	Galilee	Episode: "Pretend We're Dead"
1996	Testament: The Bible in Animation	Joseph	Voice role, 1 episode: "Joseph"
1996	The Moonstone	Ezra Jennings	Television film
1997	Bodyguards	Dusan Mesic	Episode: "A Choice of Evils"
1998	Invasion: Earth	Lt Charles Terrell	Miniseries, 4 episodes
1998	Vanity Fair	Mr Pitt Crawley	Miniseries, 5 episodes
2000	The Miracle Maker	King Herod	Voice role, television film
2000	The Scarlet Pimpernel	Antoine Picard	Episode: "Friends & Enemies"
2000	Lorna Doone	Counsellor Doone	Television film
2001	Perfect Strangers	Stephen	Miniseries, 3 episodes
2001	Murder Rooms: Mysteries of the Real Sherlock Holmes	Milburn	Miniseries, 1 episode: "The White Knight Stratagem"
2001	Uprising	Nathan Lensky	Television film
2001	Jack and the Beanstalk: The Real Story	Vidas Merlinis - Research Scientist	Miniseries, 2 episodes
2002	Animated Tales of the World	The Flower of Fern	Voice role, 1 episode: "Flower of Fern, a Tale from Poland"
2002	Dickens	Charles Dickens	Miniseries, 3 episodes
2002	Sir Gawain and the Green Knight	Bertilak - Green Knight	Voice role, television film
2002	Waking the Dead	Professor Ray Levin	Episode: "Special Relationship"
2002	The Project	Stanley Hall	Miniseries, 2 episodes
2002	Foyle's War	Austin Carmichael	Episode: "Eagle Day"
2003	Eroica	Sukowaty	Television film
2003	Midsomer Murders	Eddie Darwin	Episode: "Birds of Prey"
2003	Danielle Cable: Eyewitness	Henry Batten	Television film
2004	Silent Witness	Marcus Gwilym	Episode: "Death by Water"
2004	Dirty Filthy Love	Charles	Television film
2004	Spooks	Nicholas Ashworth	Episode: "A Prayer for My Daughter"
2005	Ahead of the Class	Graham Ranger	Television film
2005	The Girl in the Café	George	Television film
2005	Class of '76	Martin Gibson	Miniseries, 2 episodes
2005	Nova	Voltaire	Episode: "E=mc²: Einstein's Big Idea"
2006	Dalziel and Pascoe	Paul Goodman	Episode: "Guardian Angel"
2006	Vital Signs	Dr. Lindsay	4 episodes
2006	New Tricks	Pete Mackintyre	Episode: "Bank Robbery"
2006	A Touch of Frost	Dennis Prior	Episode: "Endangered Species"
2008	Midsomer Murders	Reverend Wallace Stone	Episode: "Talking to the Dead"
2008	The Palace	Archbishop of Canterbury	2 episodes
2008	Agatha Christie's Poirot	Inspector Kelsey	Episode: "Cat Among the Pigeons"
2008	Einstein and Eddington	Fritz Haber	Television film
2008	Little Dorrit	Mr. Merdle	9 episodes
2009	Casualty 1909	Dr. Henry Head	4 episodes
2010	Holby City	Sol Caplin	Episode: "Faith No More"
2010	Five Daughters	Dr. Nat Cary	Miniseries, 2 episodes
2010	Garrow's Law	John Farmer	4 episodes
2011	Primeval	Gideon	Recurring role, 6 episodes
2011	The Hour	Clarence Fendley	Main role, 5 episodes
2011	The Man Who Crossed Hitler	Rudolf Olden	Television film
2012	Secret State	Sir Michael Rix	Miniseries, 2 episodes
2012–2016	The Hollow Crown	Duke of Exeter	4 episodes
2013	Spies of Warsaw	Doctor Lapp	Miniseries, 4 episodes
2013	Mad Dogs	Alex	1 episode
2013	Ripper Street	Dr. Karl Crabbe	2 episodes
2013	The Escape Artist	Richard Mayfield, QC	Miniseries, 3 episodes
2013	Atlantis	Kyros	Episode: "Pandora's Box"
2013–2019	Game of Thrones	Qyburn	Recurring role, 22 episodes
2013–2023	Endeavour	Chief Superintendent / ACC Reginald Bright	Main role, 35 episodes
2014	Father Brown	Father Ignatius	Episode: "The Mysteries of the Rosary"
2014	The Musketeers	Émile De Mauvoisin	Episode: "The Homecoming"
2014	The Game	C	Miniseries, 1 episode
2015	Wolf Hall	Thomas More	Miniseries, 4 episodes
2015	Life in Squares	Dr. Hyslop	Miniseries, 2 episodes
2015–2016	Dickensian	Fagin	Main role, 15 episodes
2016	Hooten & the Lady	Hercules	Miniseries, 1 episode: "Moscow"
2017	Will	Walsingham	Episode: "The Play's the Thing"
2017	The Crown	Harold Macmillan	Main role (season 2), 8 episodes
2019–2020	The Trial of Christine Keeler	Michael Eddowes	Miniseries, 6 episodes
2021	A Discovery of Witches	Rabbi Loew	1 episode
2021 - Present	Dalgliesh	Father John	2 episodes
2022	Killing Eve	Robert	Episode: "Making Dead Things Look Nice"
2022	1899	Henry Singleton	8 episodes
2022–2025	Andor	Major Lio Partagaz	14 episodes
2023	Better	Vernon Marley	4 episodes
2024	Wolf Hall: The Mirror and the Light	Thomas More	2 episodes
2026–present	Harry Potter	Garrick Ollivander	Upcoming series

=== Video games ===
Video game roles by year—sortable
Year	Title	Role	Notes
2020	South of the Circle	Professor Hargreaves	Voice role

=== Audio ===
Audio roles by year—sortable
Year	Title	Role	Notes
2004	The Ruby in the Smoke	Narrator	
2008	The Shadow in the North	Narrator	
2008	The Tiger in the Well	Narrator	
2018	Falco: The Complete BBC Radio Collection	Marcus Didius Falco	
2020	The Sandman	Dr. John Hathaway	Voice role, 20 episodes

=== Theatre ===
- Romeo, Romeo and Juliet, 1980, RSC
- Hamlet, Hamlet, 1982, Donmar Warehouse, London
- Troilus, Troilus and Cressida, 1981, RSC
- Richard III, The Plantagenets (Henry VI, part 1–3 and Richard III), 1988, RSC
- Edwin Forrest, Two Shakespearean Actors, 1990, RSC
- Henry Bullingbrook, Richard II, 1990, RSC
- Petruchio, The Taming of the Shrew, 1992, RSC
- Frank Ford, The Merry Wives of Windsor, 1992, RSC
- Serge, 'Art', 1997, Wyndham's Theatre, London
- Elyot, Private Lives, 1999, Lyttelton Theatre, London
- Iachimo, Cymbeline, 2003, RSC
- Marcus Brutus, Julius Caesar, 2005, Barbican, London
- Leontes, The Winter's Tale, 2006, RSC
- Oliver Lucas, The Vertical Hour, 2008, Royal Court Theatre, London
- Dr. Rank, A Doll's House, 2009, Donmar Warehouse, London
- Laurie Lee, Red Sky at Sunrise: Laurie Lee in Words and Music, 2023–present, Hambletts Productions, Stratford-upon-Avon
- Thomas Hardy, A Beautiful Thread: Thomas Hardy in Words and Music, 2024–present, Hambletts Productions, Stratford-upon-Avon
- Ghost, Hamlet, 2025, Royal Shakespeare Company, Stratford-upon-Avon

== Awards and nominations ==
Awards and nominations by year—sortable
Year	Award	Category	Work	Result	Ref.
2016	BAFTA TV Awards	Best Supporting Actor	Wolf Hall	Nominated	
2018	Screen Actors Guild Awards	Outstanding Performance by an Ensemble in a Drama Series	The Crown	Nominated	
2018	Screen Actors Guild Awards	Outstanding Performance by an Ensemble in a Drama Series	Game of Thrones	Nominated	
