= Ayesha Gwilt =

English actress

- Born: Ayesha Dawn Gwilt
- Other name: Nisa Cole
- Occupation: Actress

Ayesha Dawn Gwilt, sometimes credited as Nisa Cole, is an English actress. She trained at the National Youth Theatre and has appeared in several theatre productions since. She also has a role in the BBC television series, All the Small Things as Grace Oudidja. The series also stars Sarah Lancashire, Neil Pearson and Richard Fleeshman.

== Early life ==
She has one sister named Rhian Gwilt (born 1992); both are the daughters of Richard and Joan Gwilt. Recent theatre credits include Seductive Shakespeare at Contact, Manchester; Meet the Mukherjees at The Octagon Theatre, Bolton; and Verbally Challenged at Contact, Manchester.

== Career ==
Gwilt is best known for portraying pupil Amy Porter in series five to seven of the award-winning BBC drama series Waterloo Road. She left Waterloo Road in series 7, episode 10. In 2011, Gwilt began to use the name Nisa Cole after she left Waterloo Road. In October 2016, she appeared as Penelope Betteredge in the BBC mini-series The Moonstone

== Filmography ==
Year	Film	Role	Notes
2009	All the Small Things	Grace Oudidja	Mini-series
2009-2011	Waterloo Road	Amy Porter	Series regular
2013	The Sparticle Mystery	Tiny	Episode: "The White Horse"
2013	Doctors	Nina Jethroe	Episode: "Young Love"
2013	Mount Pleasant	Lianne	1 episode
2016	Vera	Mia Haleford	Episode: "Tuesday's Child"
2016	Scott & Bailey	Jenna Mawson	3 episodes
2016	The Moonstone	Penelope Betteredge	Mini-series
2022	The Drowning of Arthur Braxton	Estelle Jarvis	Film
