= Eroica (2003 film) =

2003 British television film

- Directed by: Simon Cellan Jones
- Written by: Nick Dear
- Produced by: Liza Marshall
- Starring: Ian Hart; Tim Pigott-Smith; Anton Lesser; Frank Finlay
- Edited by: Joe Walker
- Music by: Wolfgang Amadeus Mozart and Ludwig van Beethoven
- Distributed by: BBC
- Release date: 4 October 2003
- Running time: 129 minutes
- Country: United Kingdom
- Language: English

Eroica is a BBC television film that dramatised the first performance of Beethoven's third symphony, the Eroica. It carried the tagline 'The day that changed music forever'.

The film was directed by Simon Cellan Jones and was written by Nick Dear. Ian Hart starred as the composer, with Tim Pigott-Smith, Anton Lesser, and Frank Finlay along with Jack Davenport and Claire Skinner leading the cast. The music was played by Orchestre Révolutionnaire et Romantique conducted by Sir John Eliot Gardiner. It won the Prix Italia for Performing Arts in 2004.

== Plot ==
The film is set in Vienna on 9 June 1804, the date of the private, first performance of Beethoven's third symphony, later to be known as the 'Eroica'. The performance, and most of the action in the film, takes place at the palace of one of Beethoven's patrons, Prince Franz Lobkowitz. Midway during the performance, Beethoven tries to persuade his lover, a widow named Josephine von Deym, to marry him, but she refuses because of the unfair laws regarding child custody — she is a member of the nobility, and cannot marry a commoner without losing custody of her children. Later, composer Joseph Haydn, now old and feeble, arrives just in time to hear the last movement of the symphony.

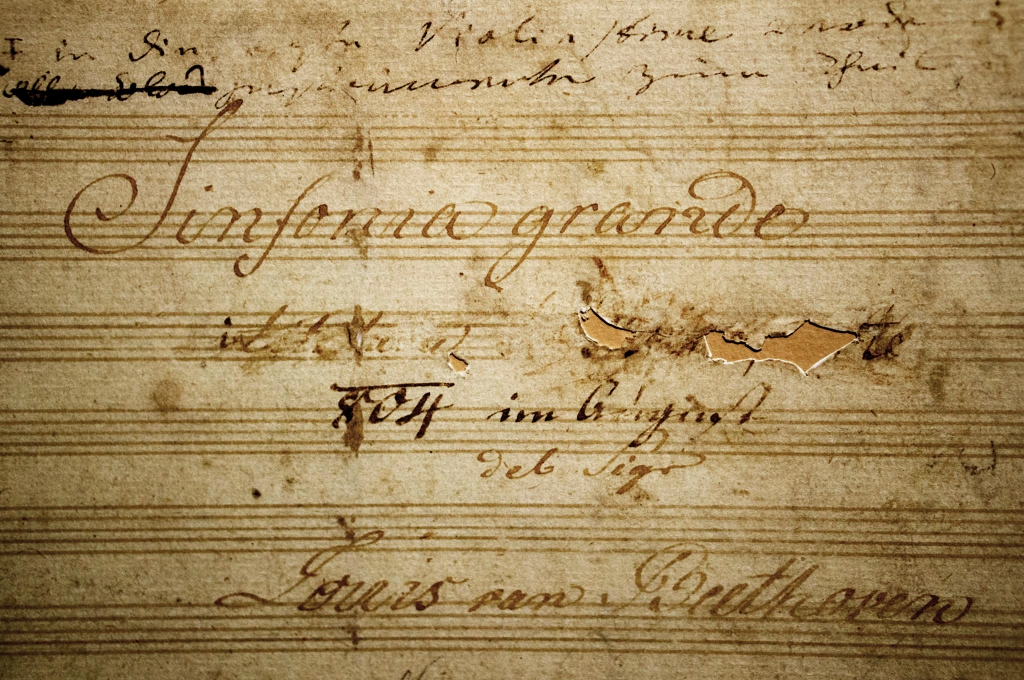
Beethoven's title page of Symphony No. 3 that shows his erasure of dedication of the work to Napoleon, to be renamed later "Eroica" instead.

During the last few minutes of the symphony, the film flashes forward, and we see Beethoven going to dinner with his pupil, Ferdinand Ries, where he is told that Napoleon has just declared himself Emperor of France, thereby completely betraying Beethoven's faith in his leadership of a republican nation. In a rage, he crumples up the title page of his symphony, which he originally intended to call the "Bonaparte". As he leaves the performance, Haydn is asked his opinion of the symphony, which he describes as "quite new", and then utters his now-famous and prophetic comment, "From this day forward, everything [in music] is changed". The film ends on a grim note; as the performance of the Eroica ends, Beethoven looks at his audience and is momentarily unable to hear any natural sounds – an ominous sign of his approaching deafness.

== Cast ==
- Ian Hart as Ludwig van Beethoven
- Tim Pigott-Smith as Count Dietrichstein
- Jack Davenport as Prince Franz Lobkowitz
- Fenella Woolgar as Princess Marie Lobkowitz
- Claire Skinner as Countess Josephine von Deym
- Lucy Akhurst as Countess Teresa von Brunswick (Josephine's sister)
- Frank Finlay as Joseph Haydn
- Leo Bill as Ferdinand Ries
- Peter Hanson as Wranitzky (violin leader of the orchestra in the film and of Orchestre Révolutionnaire et Romantique)
- Robert Glenister as Gerhardt (one of the prince's servants)
- Anton Lesser as Sukowaty (Beethoven's copyist).

== Soundtrack ==
- Eine Kleine Nachtmusik (excerpt) by Wolfgang Amadeus Mozart
- Symphony No. 3 "Eroica" by Ludwig van Beethoven
