= Orchestre Révolutionnaire et Romantique =

British orchestra

- Orchestra
- Founded: 1989
- Website: monteverdi.co.uk/about-us/orchestre-revolutionnaire-et-romantique

The Orchestre Révolutionnaire et Romantique, founded in 1989 by John Eliot Gardiner, performs Classical and Romantic music using the principles and original instruments of historically informed performance. The orchestra has recorded symphonies, operas, concertos, and other works of Beethoven, Berlioz, Brahms, Gluck, Mendelssohn, Schumann, Verdi, and Weber. The orchestra and the Monteverdi Choir performed a premiere recording (audio and TV) of the Berlioz Messe solennelle in Westminster Cathedral, London 1993. The orchestra performed in the BBC television film Eroica, a dramatisation of Beethoven's own performance of his third symphony.

== See also ==
- English Baroque Soloists
- John Eliot Gardiner
- Period Instruments
