= The Moonstone =

1868 novel by Wilkie Collins

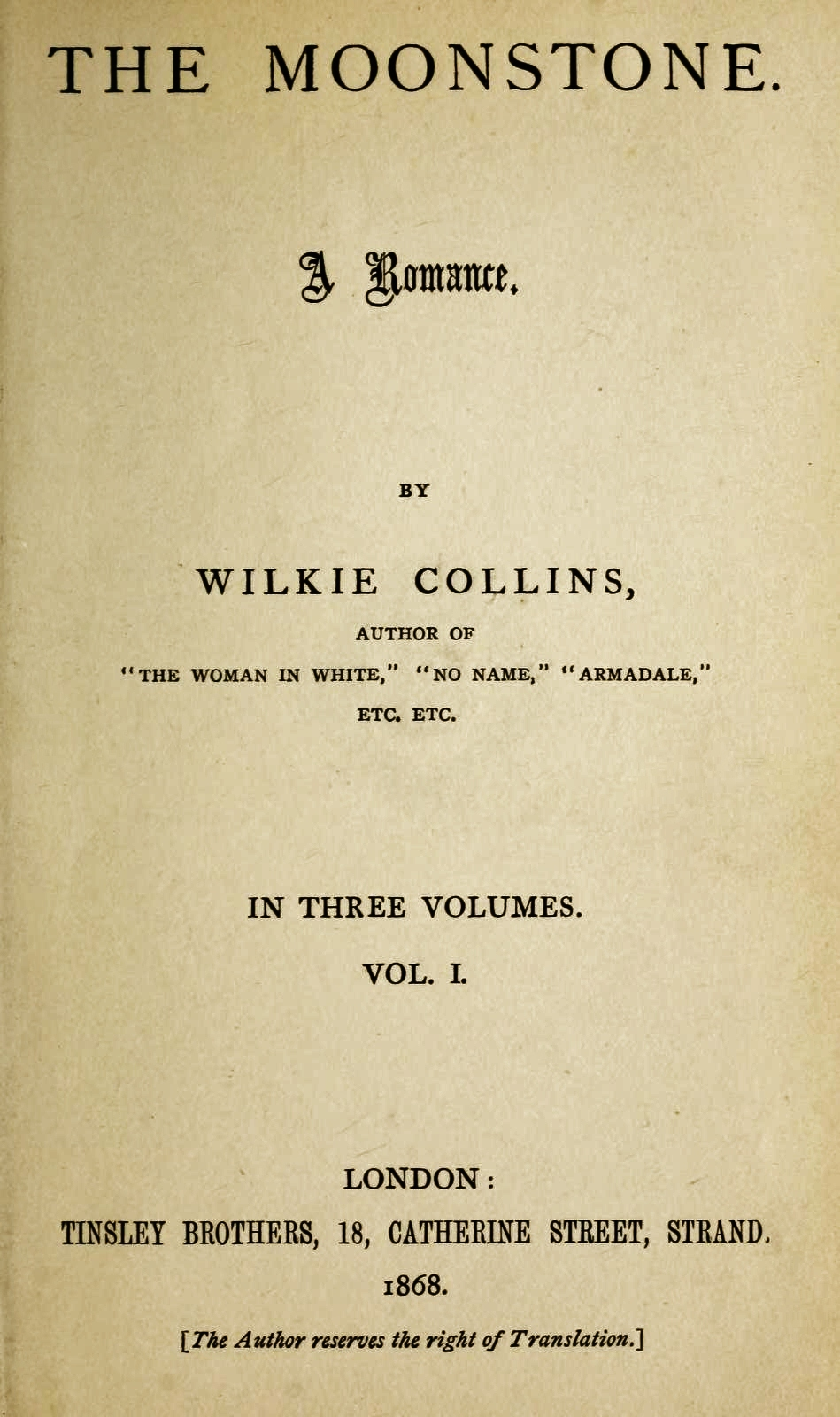
- First edition title page
- Author: Wilkie Collins
- Language: English
- Genre: Epistolary novel Detective novel
- Set in: Yorkshire and London, 1848–1850
- Published: 1868 (book form)
- Publisher: Tinsley Brothers
- Publication place: England
- Media type: Print
- Dewey Decimal: 823.89
- LC Class: PR4494.M62
- Text: The Moonstone at Wikisource

The Moonstone: A Romance by Wilkie Collins is an 1868 British epistolary novel. It is an early example of the modern detective novel, and established many of the ground rules of the modern genre. Its publication was started on 4 January 1868 and was completed on 8 August 1868. The story was serialised in Charles Dickens's magazine All the Year Round. Collins adapted The Moonstone for the stage in 1877.

== Etymology ==
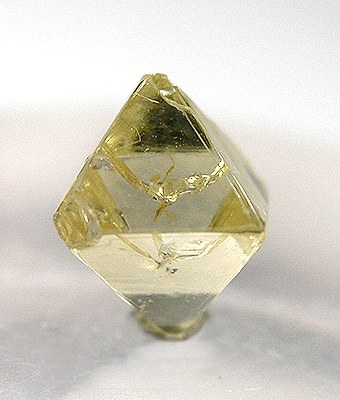
A yellow diamond with a flaw in the centre, similar to the "Moonstone" of the novel.

The Moonstone of the title is a diamond (not to be confused with the semi-precious moonstone gem). It has gained its name from its association with the Hindu god of the Moon, Chandra. It is protected by three hereditary guardians on the orders of Vishnu, and waxes and wanes in brilliance along with the light of the Moon.

== Plot outline ==
Rachel Verinder, a young English woman, inherits a large Indian diamond on her eighteenth birthday. It is a legacy from her uncle, a corrupt British army officer who served in India. The diamond is of great religious significance and extremely valuable, and three Hindu priests have dedicated their lives to recovering it. The story incorporates elements of the legendary origins of the Hope Diamond (or perhaps the Orloff Diamond or the Koh-i-Noor). Rachel's eighteenth birthday is celebrated with a large party at which the guests include her cousin Franklin Blake. She wears the Moonstone on her dress that evening for all to see, including some Indian jugglers who have called at the house. Later that night the diamond is stolen from Rachel's bedroom, and a period of turmoil, unhappiness, misunderstandings and ill luck ensues. Told by a series of narratives from some of the main characters, the complex plot traces the subsequent efforts to explain the theft, identify the thief, trace the stone and recover it.

== Plot summary ==
Colonel Herncastle, an unpleasant former soldier, brings the Moonstone back with him from India where he acquired it by theft and murder during the Siege of Seringapatam. Angry at his family, who shun him, he leaves it in his will as a birthday gift to his niece Rachel, thus exposing her to attack by the stone's hereditary guardians, who will stop at nothing to retrieve it.

Rachel wears the stone to her birthday party, but that night it disappears from her room. Suspicion falls on three Indian jugglers who have been near the house; on Rosanna Spearman, a maidservant who begins to act oddly and who then drowns herself in a local quicksand; and on Rachel herself, who also behaves suspiciously and is suddenly furious with Franklin Blake, with whom she has previously appeared to be enamoured, when he directs attempts to find it. Despite the efforts of Sergeant Cuff, a renowned Scotland Yard detective, the house party ends with the mystery unsolved, and the protagonists disperse.

During the ensuing year there are hints that the diamond was removed from the house and may be in a London bank vault, having been pledged as surety to a moneylender. The Indian jugglers are still nearby, watching and waiting. Rachel's grief and isolation increase, especially after her mother dies, and she first accepts and then rejects a marriage proposal from her cousin Godfrey Ablewhite, a philanthropist who was also present at the birthday dinner and whose father owns the bank near Rachel's old family home. Finally Franklin Blake returns from travelling abroad and determines to solve the mystery. He first discovers that Rosanna Spearman's behaviour was due to her having fallen in love with him. She found evidence (a paint smear on his nightclothes) that convinced her that he was the thief and concealed it to save him, confusing the trail of evidence and throwing suspicion on herself. In despair at her inability to make him acknowledge her despite all she had done for him, she killed herself, leaving behind the smeared gown and a letter he did not receive at the time because of his hasty departure abroad.

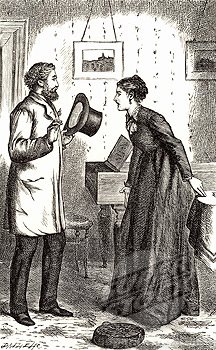
Rachel Verinder confronts Franklin Blake (1891 illustration)

Now believing that Rachel suspects him of the theft on Rosanna's evidence, Franklin engineers a meeting and asks her. To his astonishment she tells him she actually saw him steal the diamond and has been protecting his reputation at the cost of her own even though she believes him to be a thief and a hypocrite. With hope of redeeming himself he returns to Yorkshire to the scene of the crime and is befriended by Mr. Ezra Jennings, the assistant of Dr. Candy, the doctor. They join to continue the investigations and learn that Franklin was secretly given laudanum during the night of the party (by Mr. Candy, who wanted to exact vengeance on Franklin for criticising medicine); it appears that this, in addition to his anxiety about Rachel and the diamond and other nervous irritations, caused him to take the diamond in a narcotic trance, to move it to a safe place. A re-enactment of the evening's events confirms this, but how the stone ended up in a London bank remains a mystery solved only a year after the birthday party when the stone is redeemed.

Franklin and his allies trace the claimant to a seedy waterside inn, only to discover that the Indians have got there first: the claimant is dead and the stone is gone. Under the dead man's disguise is none other than Godfrey Ablewhite, who is found to have embezzled the contents of a trust fund in his care and to have been facing exposure soon after the birthday party. The mystery of what Blake did while in his drugged state is solved: he encountered Ablewhite in the passageway outside Rachel's room and gave the Moonstone to him to be put back in his father's bank, from which it had been withdrawn on the morning of the party to be given to Rachel. Seeing his salvation, Ablewhite pocketed the stone instead, and pledged it as surety for a loan to save himself temporarily from insolvency. When he was murdered, he was on his way to Amsterdam to have the stone cut; it would then have been sold to replenish the plundered trust fund before the beneficiary inherited. The mystery is solved, Rachel and Franklin marry, and in an epilogue from Mr. Murthwaite, a noted adventurer, the reader learns of the restoration of the Moonstone to the place where it should be, in the forehead of the idol of the god in India.

== Characters ==
- Rachel Verinder is the fiery and independent daughter of the Verinder family. Throughout much of the book, she believes that her lover Franklin Blake stole the diamond
- Julia, Lady Verinder (née Herncastle) is her mother, a wealthy widow. She is devoted to her daughter, and summons Sergeant Cuff to investigate the theft of the Moonstone
- Colonel John Herncastle is a professional soldier and the brother of Lady Verinder. He is suspected of foul deeds during the Siege of Seringapatem in India; he gained the Moonstone by unlawful means (namely murder and theft)
- Gabriel Betteredge is a venerable man and the Verinders' head servant. He bases his personal philosophy around the book Robinson Crusoe, and frequently uses quotes from it to apply to different situations. He narrates the first section of the novel, and assists Sergeant Cuff in his investigations
- Penelope Betteredge is the daughter of Gabriel, and is also a servant in the household
- Rosanna Spearman is the second housemaid of the Verinders. A lonely figure, she was once placed in a penitentiary for theft, and so suspected of the theft of the diamond. She is infatuated with Franklin Blake and attempts to protect him; she eventually commits suicide in the Shivering Sands
- Drusilla Clack is a poor cousin of Rachel Verinder and the second narrator of the novel. A comical character, she is an unpleasant, hypocritical meddler who attempts to distribute religious tracts that she does not actually believe in. She idolizes Godfrey Ablewhite
- Franklin Blake is an adventurer and amateur detective. He is also a cousin and suitor of Rachel. It is established that he stole the Moonstone unwittingly under the influence of opium. At the end of the novel, Rachel and Franklin are married
- Godfrey Ablewhite is a philanthropist and lay preacher. He is a cousin of Rachel Verinder who becomes engaged to her in order to steal her fortune; he is the true thief of the Moonstone, and is eventually murdered by Hindu priests anxious to recover it
- Mathew Bruff is the family solicitor and the third narrator of the book. He reveals Godfrey Ablewhite's true motives to Rachel Verinder
- Sergeant Cuff is a famous detective with a penchant for roses. He is commissioned by Lady Verinder to solve the theft of the diamond, and despite being later discharged he is able to find the true culprit. He is an early example of the police detective in English crime fiction
- Dr Thomas Candy is the family physician, who loses the ability to speak coherently after recovering from a fever. Offended by Franklin Blake's comments on the profession of medicine, he doses him with laudanum as a jest, setting the events of the plot in motion
- Ezra Jennings is Dr Candy's unpopular and odd-looking assistant. He suffers from an incurable illness and uses opium to control the pain. His knowledge of this allows him to use opium to reveal the memories of Franklin Blake, solving the mystery. He is the fourth narrator in the book
- Superintendent Seegrave is an ineffective police officer who accidentally insults several members of the Verinder household before Sergeant Cuff is able to take over
- Mr Murthwaite is a noted adventurer who has travelled frequently in India. He provides the epilogue to the story, in which he sees the Moonstone restored to its rightful place
- Septimus Luker is a moneylender. He has at one point possession of the Moonstone, before passing it on to Godfrey Ablewhite
- Lucy Yolland is a neighbour of the Verinders who is the confidential friend of Rosanna Spearman
- The Indian jugglers are three disguised Hindu Brahmins who are determined to recover the diamond.

== Background ==
In researching the novel, Collins primarily drew on texts such as Charles William King's The Natural History of Precious Stones and Gems and of the Precious Metals (1865), Sir David Baird's autobiography and James Talboys Wheeler's The History of India (1867). As well as this, he consulted various explorers to provide him first-hand information about Indian culture in order to increase the veracity of his book. At this early stage, the book's title was The Serpent's Eye.

The final novel was serialised in the periodical All the Year Round from 4 January to 8 August 1868, as well as simultaneously in the American publication Harper's Magazine. This period was affected by several difficulties in Collins' life. His mother, Harriet Collins, died on 19 March 1868, and his presence at her bedside caused the novel to fall behind schedule. He also began to suffer a painful attack of gout, which he described in a preface to the 1871 edition as "the bitterest affliction of my life and the severest illness from which I have ever suffered". To dull the pain, Collins took large amounts of laudanum, resulting in portions of the novel to be written in a drug-induced haze. He would later comment that he did not recall writing these passages. Considering the substantial role the memory-altering effects of opium have in the plot of the novel, this seems significant. The Moonstone was eventually published in book form by William Tinsley on 16 July 1868; it was dedicated to his mother.

== Themes ==
A major theme of the novel is the intrusion of imperialism on everyday English life. Lynn Pykett argues that "the main narrative of The Moonstone concerns the disruption of the tranquility and order of genteel English life by a colonial legacy." The events of the plot are set into motion by Colonel John Herncastle's unlawful theft of the Moonstone in India, and, in leaving the diamond to Rachel Verinder in his will, he is perpetuating his crime. It is only when the diamond is returned to its rightful owners that the 'curse' can be lifted. Pykett also comments that the contradictory forces of feminine passion and silence provide the conflict of the novel, "[Sergeant] Cuff is defeated by the silence of women (Rachel and Rosanna), by feminine reticence (Lady Verinder), and the failure of individual women to conform to dominant stereotypes of femininity".

== Literary significance ==
The book is regarded by some as the forerunner of the modern mystery novel and the suspense novel. T. S. Eliot called it "the first, the longest, and the best of modern English detective novels in a genre invented by Collins and not by Poe," and Dorothy L. Sayers praised it as "probably the very finest detective story ever written". G. K. Chesterton calls it "probably the best detective tale in the world". Graham Greene argues that The Sign of Four is derived "a little too closely" from it. It was published in 1868, later than Poe's short story mysteries "The Murders in the Rue Morgue" (1841) (which introduced the famous locked-room paradigm), "The Mystery of Marie Rogêt" (1842) and "The Purloined Letter" (1845). The plot also shows some parallels with The Hermitage (1839), an earlier murder mystery story by the English novelist Sarah Burney: for example, the return of a childhood companion, the sexual symbolism of defloration implied in the crime, and the almost catatonic reactions of the heroine to it. The Moonstone introduced a number of the elements that became classic attributes of the twentieth-century detective story in novel form, as opposed to Poe's short story form. These include:

- an English country house robbery
- an "inside job"
- red herrings
- a celebrated, skilled, professional investigator
- a bungling local constabulary
- detective enquiries
- a large number of false suspects
- the "least likely suspect"
- a reconstruction of the crime
- a final twist in the plot.

Franklin Blake, the gifted amateur, is an early example of the gentleman detective. The highly competent Sergeant Cuff, the policeman called in from Scotland Yard (whom Collins based on the real-life Inspector Jonathan Whicher who solved the murder committed by Constance Kent), is not a member of the gentry and is unable to break Rachel Verinder's reticence about what Cuff knows is an inside job. The Moonstone has also been posited as perhaps the earliest police procedural, due to the portrayal of Cuff. The social difference between Collins's two detectives is shown by their relationships with the Verinder family: Sergeant Cuff befriends Gabriel Betteredge, Lady Verinder's steward (chief servant), whereas Franklin Blake eventually marries her daughter Rachel.

A number of critics have suggested that Charles Felix (pseudonym for Charles Warren Adams), in his Notting Hill Mystery (1862–1863), first used techniques that came to define the genre.

The Moonstone represents Collins's only complete reprisal of the popular "multi-narration" method that he had previously used to great effect in The Woman in White. The sections by Gabriel Betteredge (steward to the Verinder household) and Miss Clack (a poor relative and religious crank) offer both humour and pathos through their contrast with the testimony of other narrators, at the same time constructing and advancing the novel's plot.

The novel was Collins's last great success, coming at the end of an extraordinarily productive period in which four successive novels became bestsellers. After The Moonstone Collins wrote novels containing more overt social commentary that did not achieve the same audience.

A fictionalised account of Collins's life while writing The Moonstone forms much of the plot of Dan Simmons's novel Drood (2009).

== Adaptations ==
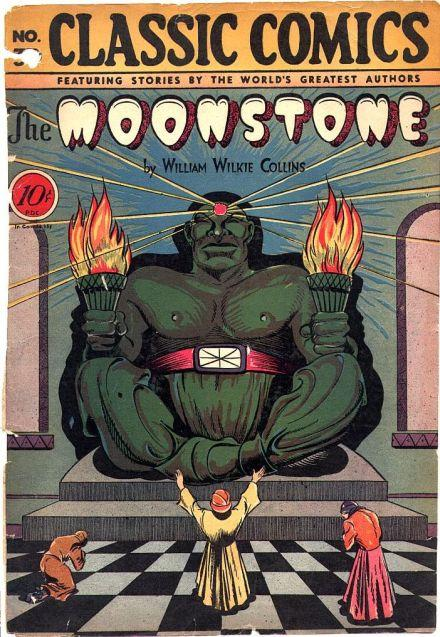
Cover of the Classic Comics edition

The Moonstone had a great influence on other authors of the time, and books inspired by Collins' work quickly began appearing. Charles Dickens' The Mystery of Edwin Drood (1870) also features the theme of opium addiction, as well as several Anglo-Indian characters. Anthony Trollope's The Eustace Diamonds (1873) was written to tap into the thread of popular interest that Collins' novel caused, with the central plot revolving around the investigation of stolen jewels. A later book inspired by Wilkie Collins is Philip Pullman's The Ruby in the Smoke (1985).

The novel was made into several silent films during the first few decades of the twentieth century. A 1909 film version, The Moonstone, was produced by William Nicholas Selig, although no copies have since survived. Another silent film, The Moonstone, was directed in 1915 by Frank Hall Crane.

In 1934, the book was made into a film, The Moonstone by Monogram Pictures Corporation. Adapted to the screen by Adele S. Buffington, it was directed by Reginald Barker, and starred David Manners as Franklin Blake, Charles Irwin as Inspector Cuff and Phyllis Barry as Anne Verinder.

On 11 March 1945, "The Moonstone" was episode number 67 of the U.S. radio series The Weird Circle.

In 1946, Classic Comics, the predecessor of Classics Illustrated, published in comic book format the novel in issue #30, with cover and artwork by Don Rico. The adaptation was re-published in 1960 with cover and artwork by L.B. Cole.

On 15 April 1947, an adaptation of "The Moonstone" was episode #47 of the NBC radio series Favorite Story hosted by Ronald Colman.

On 16 November and 23 November 1953, "The Moonstone", starring Peter Lawford, was broadcast as a two-part episode of the U.S. radio drama "Suspense".

In 1959, the BBC adapted the novel as a television serial starring James Hayter as Gabriel Betteredge, Patrick Cargill as Sergeant Cuff, James Sharkey as Franklin Blake and Mary Webster as Rachel Verinder.

In 1972, a further BBC adaptation was made, featuring Robin Ellis as Franklin Blake, Martin Jarvis as Godfrey Ablewhite, Vivien Heilbron as Rachel Verinder and John Welsh as Sergeant Cuff. This second version was aired in the United States on PBS's Masterpiece Theatre.

In 1972, an Italian TV version of the novel, entitled "La pietra di luna" was broadcast on the RAI, the Italian National Network. It was directed by Anton Giulio Majano, who had already directed adaptations from Dickens, Thackeray, and Stevenson.

In 1974, a German version, Der Monddiamant, was produced by Westdeutscher Rundfunk for television.

In November 1977, Marvel Comics released a comic-book adaptation of the book in issue #23 of the "Marvel Classics Comics" series.

A radio adaptation aired in seven thirty minute episodes on BBC Radio 4 in 1979, with John Telfer as Franklin Blake, John Franklyn-Robbins as Sergeant Cuff, Sally Baxter as Rachel Verinder and Geoffrey Beevers as Godfrey Ablewhite .

In 1996, The Moonstone was made for television by the BBC and Carlton Television in partnership with WGBH of Boston, Massachusetts, airing again on Masterpiece Theatre. It starred Greg Wise as Franklin Blake, Antony Sher as Sergeant Cuff and Keeley Hawes as Rachel Verinder.

In 1998, a fifteen-episode radio dramatization, with each episode lasting fifteen minutes, aired on the BBC World Service, adapted by Micheline Wandor.

In 2011, BBC Radio 4 serialised the story in four hour-long episodes in the Classic Serial slot with Eleanor Bron as Lady Verinder, Paul Rhys as Franklin Blake, Jasmine Hyde as Rachel Verinder and Kenneth Cranham as Sergeant Cuff.

In 2016, the BBC adapted the novel for a five-part afternoon TV series The Moonstone starting 31 October 2016, with Joshua Silver as Franklin Blake, Terenia Edwards as Rachel Verinder and John Thomson as Sergeant Cuff.

In December 2018, Screen14 Pictures, a team that produces fictional stories' adaption for the web, created a serialised web series of the novel on YouTube, Twitter, and Instagram.

In April 2020, the novel was read in serialized fashion by Phoebe Judge of Criminal on her Phoebe Reads a Mystery podcast.
