= The Moonstone (1909 film) =

1909 silent short film

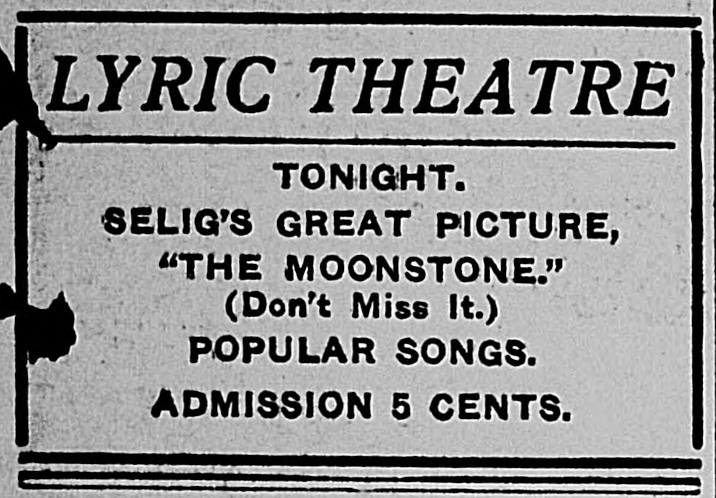
- Contemporary advertisement
- Based on: The Moonstone by Wilkie Collins
- Produced by: William Nicholas Selig
- Distributed by: Selig Polyscope Company
- Release date: June 10, 1909
- Country: United States
- Language: English

The Moonstone is a 1909 silent film produced by William Nicholas Selig and released by Selig Polyscope Company. This film has a great chance of being a lost film; no sources indicate if any copies have existed. It is also unknown who starred in this film or who directed it.

== Film background ==
This film was based on the British three volume novel (a standard of the time in Britain and England to separate a novel in three volumes) The Moonstone published in 1868 and which is highly regarded as one of the first English language detective crime novels. This film was remade in 1915; the oldest known version to exist. Other remakes were released in 1934, 1972, and 1997.
