= Wenzel Sukowaty =

Austrian music copyist

Wenzel Sukowaty (August 31, 1746 – July 9, 1810) was an Austrian music copyist. His shop was founded c.1784, but payment records show that he was the principal music copyist for the Viennese court theatres from 1778 to 1796. Scores he worked with include original performance scores for Die Entführung aus dem Serail, Il matrimonio segreto, Le nozze di Figaro, Don Giovanni and Così fan tutte. Sukowaty is a character in the film Eroica, as a copyist for Ludwig van Beethoven.
