= The Moonstone (1959 TV series) =

- Genre: Mystery
- Based on: The Moonstone by Wilkie Collins
- Written by: A.R. Rawlinson
- Starring: James Hayter; Mary Webster; James Sharkey
- Country of origin: United Kingdom
- Original language: English
- No. of series: 1
- No. of episodes: 7

Production
- Producer: Shaun Sutton
- Running time: 30 minutes (per episode)
- Production company: BBC

Original release
- Network: BBC
- Release: 23 August – 4 October 1959

The Moonstone is a 1959 British television serial adapted from the 1868 Wilkie Collins novel The Moonstone. The series was made by the BBC and ran in 1959 over seven episodes.

== Cast and characters ==
Actor/Actress	Role
James Hayter	Gabriel Betteredge
Annabelle Lee	Penelope Betteredge
Barry Letts	Colonel Herncastle
Rachel Gurney	Lady Verinder
Mary Webster	Rachel Verinder
Dorothy Gordon	Rosanna Spearman
James Sharkey	Franklin Blake
Anthony Sagar	Jame
Patrick Cargill	Inspector Cuff
Colin Douglas	Tom Yolland
