= The Moonstone (1915 film) =

1915 film by Frank Hall Crane

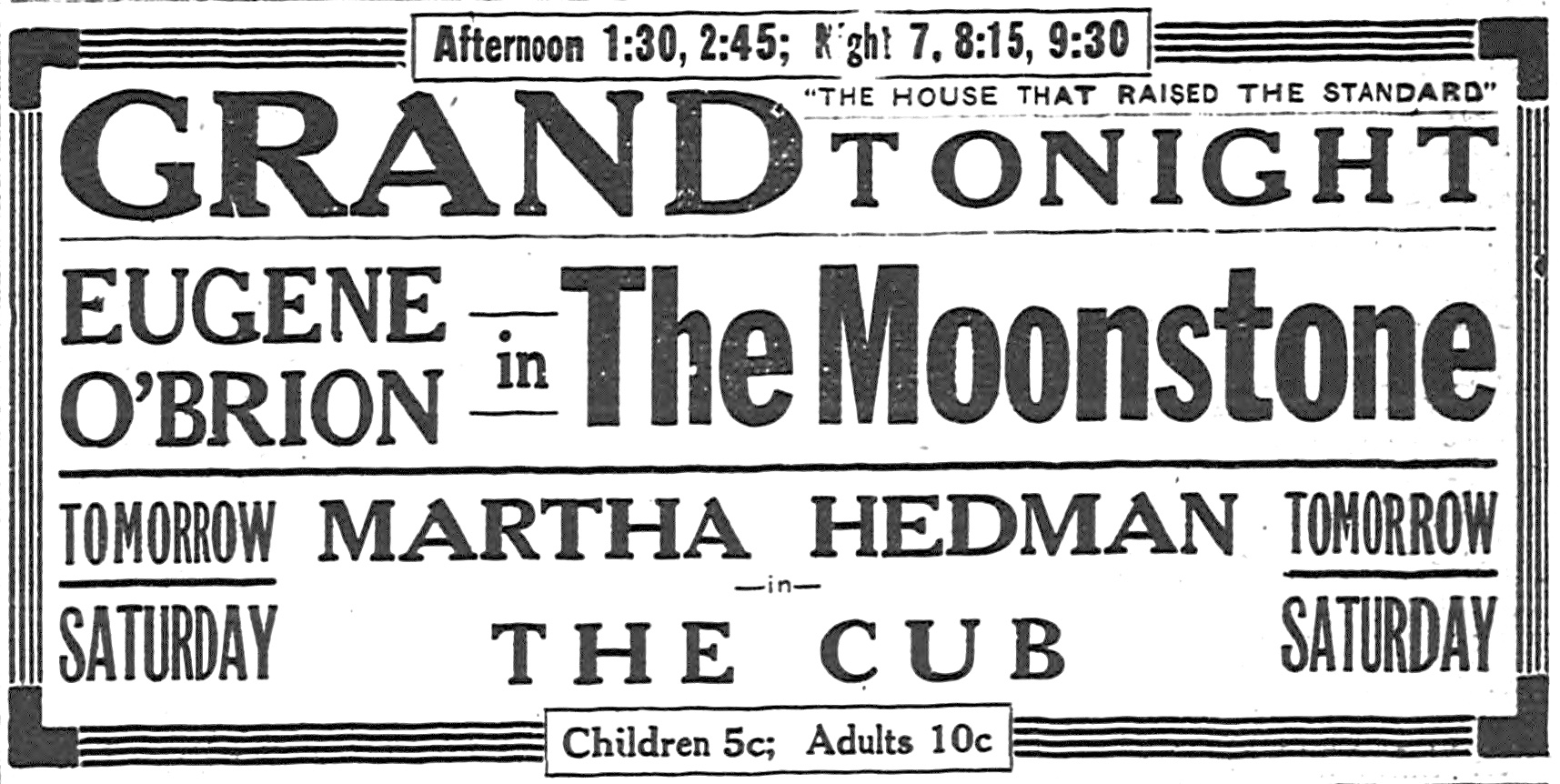
- Contemporary advertisement
- Directed by: Frank Hall Crane
- Written by: Wilkie Collins (novel) (play), E. Magnus Ingleton(scenario)
- Starring: Eugene O'Brien, Elaine Hammerstein and Ruth Findlay
- Distributed by: World Film
- Release date: June 21, 1915 (U.S.)
- Running time: 50 minutes
- Country: United States
- Language: Silent

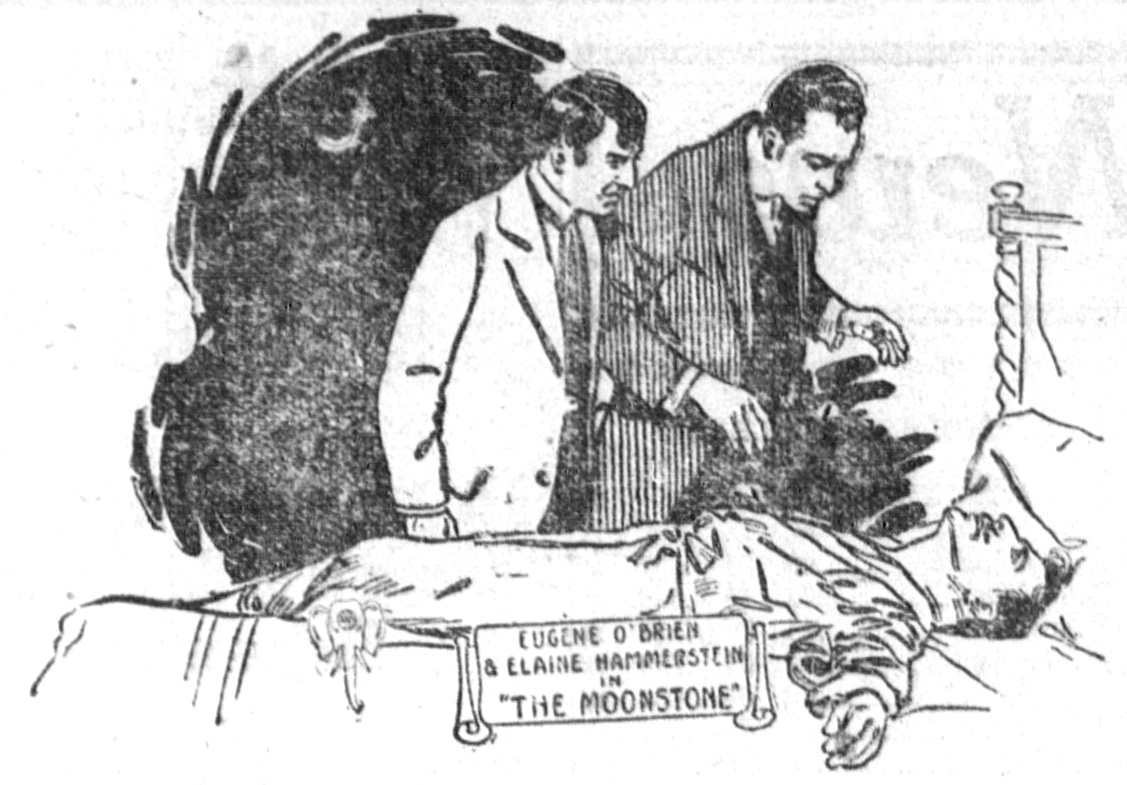
Contemporary drawn depiction of a scene from the film.

The Moonstone is a 1915 silent film directed by Frank Hall Crane. The film stars Eugene O'Brien as Franklin Blake, Elaine Hammerstein as Rachel Verinder, Ruth Findlay as Rosanna Spearman, among others.

A copy of this film survives.

== Film background ==
This film was based on the 1868 novel The Moonstone. A film was made in 1909, believed to be a lost film. Other film versions include 1934, 1972, and 1997.

== Plot ==
A priest at the Temple of the Moon in Delhi delivers a curse upon the diamond in the eye of the Temple's Buddha that will follow anyone bearing the stone if it is stolen. When Englishman John Herncastle steals the diamond, the three priests guarding it are stripped of their caste until it is returned. They pursue Herncastle to London, where the Englishman drowns in his bathtub. The jewel, having been willed to his niece, Rachel Verinder, is entrusted to Herncastle's executor, Franklin Blake, who loves Rachel. After it is stolen from Rachel's jewel case, her maid, who loves Franklin, commits suicide and leaves a note accusing Franklin of the theft, which causes a quarrel between Rachel and Franklin. While the Indian priests torment Franklin and Rachel using opiates, blow-guns and poison, Franklin finds the jewel with a money lender. A doctor discovers that Franklin took the jewel while sleepwalking. His friend, Godfrey White, then stole it and died. Franklin and Rachel are reunited, and the priests return the stone to the Buddha's eye.

== Reception ==
Lynde Denig of the Moving Picture World praised the plot for its complexity and twists, stating that "a tale of this description must be followed with close attention, and in either case the reward will be an ingeniously contrived, highly colored romance - a story pleasantly removed from the prosaic facts of everyday life". Denig also praised the scenery, as well as the cast's performance.
