= Rachel Verinder =

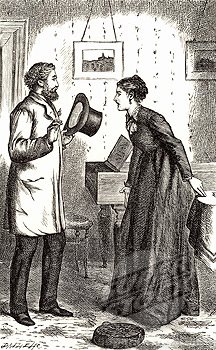
- Miss Verinder confronting Franklin Blake
- Created by: Wilkie Collins

In-universe information
- Gender: Female
- Family: Sir John Verinder (father); Lady Julia Verinder (mother)
- Spouse: Franklin Blake
- Relatives: Lord Herncastle (grandfather); Mrs Merridew (aunt); Arthur Herncastle (uncle); John Herncastle (uncle); Adelaide Blake (aunt); Caroline Ablewhite (aunt); Drusilla Clack (cousin); Franklin Blake (cousin/husband); two Blake children (cousins); Godfrey Ablewhite (cousin); the three Miss Ablewhites (cousins)
- Nationality: British

Rachel Verinder is a character in Wilkie Collins' 1868 novel The Moonstone. Despite her being the heroine, the story is never related from her viewpoint, as it is in turn from the other main protagonists, leaving her character always seen from the outside.

== Character ==
A somewhat spoilt and self-reliant girl, Rachel is in love with her cousin Franklin Blake. P. D. James saw her as one of the examples of Collins' rare (Victorian) ability to depict women capable of real desire: With her temper, insistence on making her own decisions, and readiness to grapple with the social implications of her passion for a man she thinks of as a thief, Rachel has been seen as a prototype of the New Woman, as anticipated in the sensation novel.

== Media treatments ==
The Moonstone has often been portrayed in film. In the 1934 adaptation, Phyllis Barry appears as Rachel (or Ann Verinder, as she was therein called).

- In the 1959 TV series she was played by Mary Webster.
- In the 1996 TV film she was played by Keeley Hawes.

== See also ==
- Paula Powers
- Protofeminism
