= Mary Webster (British actress) =

British actress (1935–2014)

Mary Veronica Webster (1935 in Evesham, Worcestershire – 3 October 2014 in Totland, Isle of Wight) was a British actress best known for her 45 appearances as Sarah Onedin in the BBC nautical drama The Onedin Line (1971–79).

Webster's first television appearance was in The Man from the South for Cameo Theatre (1955). She went on to appear in, among others, A Christmas Carol (1958), William Tell (1958), The Moonstone (1959), Dixon of Dock Green (1963), Dr Finlay's Casebook (1963), Redcap (1964), Danger Man (1965), The Troubleshooters (1966), Adam Adamant Lives! (1966), Jackanory (1968), Softly, Softly (1968), Z-Cars (1970), and The Onedin Line (1971–79).

Webster married William Slater at Marylebone in 1959; he directed several episodes of The Onedin Line.
