= Miss Clack =

Drusilla Clack
- Created by: Wilkie Collins

In-universe information
- Gender: Female
- Relatives: Lord John Verinder (uncle); Mrs Merridew (aunt); Rachel Verinder (cousin)
- Nationality: British

Miss Drusilla Clack is a character, and part-narrator, in Wilkie Collins' 1868 novel The Moonstone.

A poor relation of the Verinder family, Miss Clack is an ardent Evangelical, and has a habit of handing out improving tracts to strangers and family alike.

== Social and Historical Context ==
P. D. James suggests that, as "an evangelical busybody... Miss Clack occasionally gets close to being a caricature". A quasi-editorial footnote alerts us to the way her narrative is intended to have "unquestionable value as an instrument for the exhibition of Miss Clack's character"; and when she describes her eavesdropping as "A martyrdom was before me", or exclaims "Sorrow and sympathy! Oh, what Pagan emotions to expect from a Christian Englishwoman", her role as comic self-betrayer becomes very apparent.

However, there was another side to her presentation: Collins – like Dickens, aware of the power behind Victorian evangelicanism, and of how spite and aggression could be concealed under a philanthropic cloak – mingled the serious with the comic in his portrayal of Miss Clack. The issue comes to a head with regard to her apparently endless distribution of tracts – extracts in pamphlet form of evangelical literature – to the modern eye, a seemingly unique eccentricity. We first see her giving tracts to a servant and a cabbie in place of a tip; and then concealing no less than "twelve precious publications" around her dying aunt's house for the latter to find. This sort of activity would be characteristic of individuals associated with the Religious Tract Society, which published literally millions of tracts from 1799 onward of precisely the kind Collins describes; its members took pride in going to great lengths to disseminate their messages.

Thus it is only in the context of the strength of the evangelical mobilisation of public opinion behind the enforcement of Victorian morality, and the opposition to this influence in some quarters, that the significance of Miss Clack can be fully appreciated. Writers like Collins and G. M. Trevelyan opposed what they saw as "the peculiarly nauseous form of charity as a vehicle for tracts and enforced religion", judging that it was generally applied to social inferiors, with aggression masquerading as generosity.

== See also ==
- Godfrey Ablewhite
- Mrs Jellyby
- Political correctness
- Proclamation Society
- Social justice warrior
- Society for the Suppression of Vice
