= Sergeant Cuff =

Fictional detective

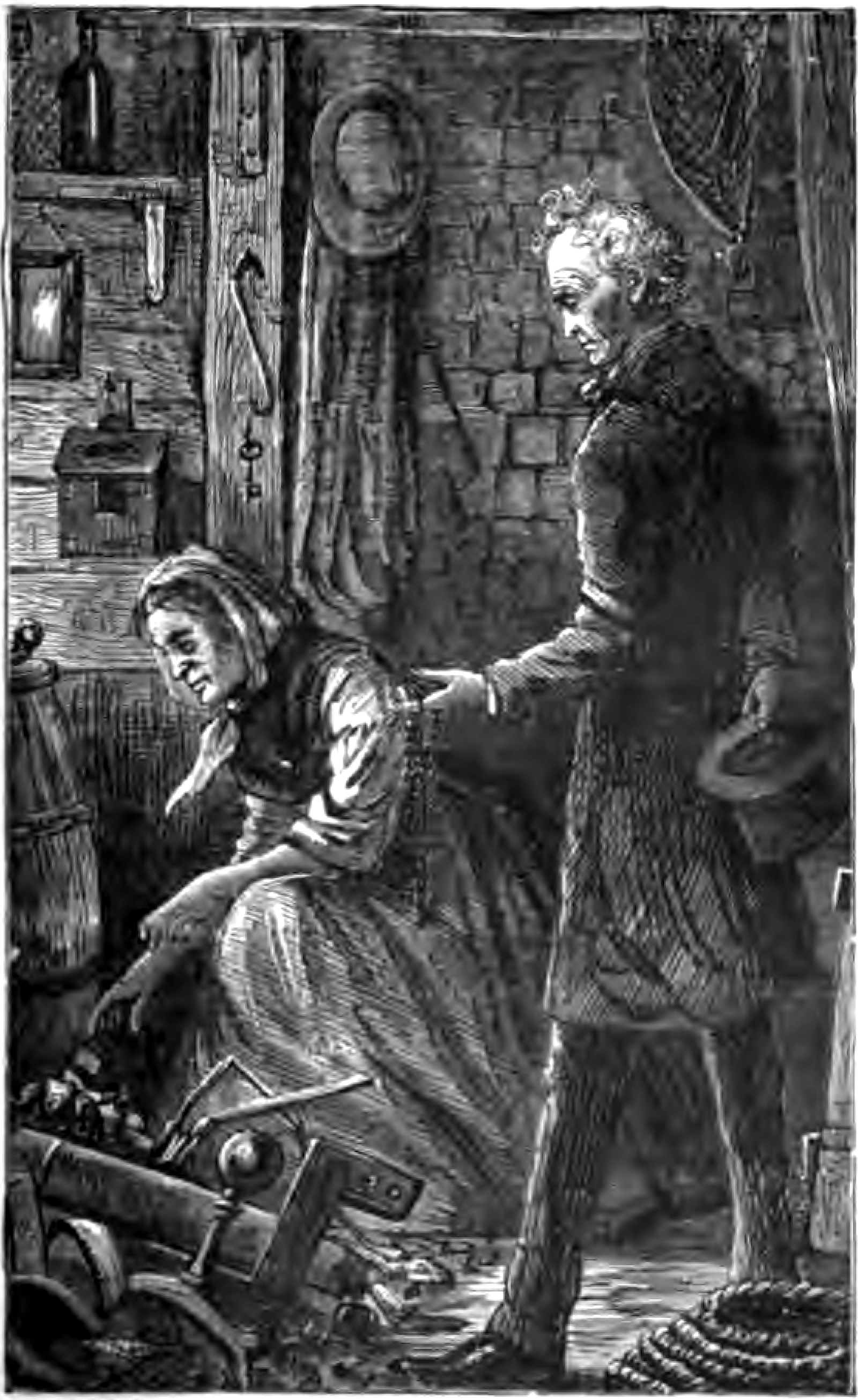
- Sergeant Cuff interviews Mrs Yolland about the crime.
- First appearance: The Moonstone; 1868
- Created by: Wilkie Collins
- Based on: Inspector Jack Whicher
- Portrayed by: Charles Irwin (1934); Patrick Cargill (1959); John Welsh (1972); Antony Sher (1996); Kenneth Cranham (2011); John Thomson (2016)

In-universe information
- Occupation: Police Detective

Sergeant Richard Cuff is a fictional character in Wilkie Collins' 1868 novel The Moonstone. He represents one of the earliest portrayals of a police detective in an English novel.

== Description ==
Cuff is described within the novel as confident and intelligent, with a piercing gaze and a self-possessed manner. Physically, he is "a grizzled, elderly man... his face was as sharp as a hatchet, and the skin of it was as yellow and dry and withered as an autumn leaf".

He is characterised as having a passionate interest for growing roses, and has the habit of whistling The Last Rose of Summer, a traditional Irish song, when investigating.

== Inspiration ==
Wilkie Collins worked alongside Charles Dickens on the weekly newspaper All the Year Round, and evidence suggests that both were individually inspired by police detective Charles Frederick Field. While Dickens used Field as the basis for the character as Inspector Bucket in Bleak House (1853), it is likely that Collins was also inspired by the "thief-taker".

Wilkie Collins was also inspired by Detective Inspector Jack Whicher in creating Cuff, particularly his investigation of the 1860 murder of Francis Saville Kent. Several plot details from The Moonstone derive from the Road Hill Case, including the missing nightdress stained with paint and the incriminating laundry book. Cuff's melancholic nature was also inspired by Whicher, as well as his role of a London detective investigating a rural household. The case was still in the public mind as Constance Kent confessed for the crime in 1865, three years before the publication of the novel. Inspector Cuff would undoubtedly have been recognised as a reflection of Whicher by the Victorian reading public.

The name 'Cuff' comes from contemporary Victorian slang, meaning 'to handcuff'.

== Influence ==
Cuff differs from later portrayals of the 'Great Detective' by not arriving at the correct solution, accusing Miss Rachel Verinder instead of the actual culprit, Godfrey Ablewhite. In examining the work in parallel with the Road Hill House case, Cuff arrived at the same conclusion that Whicher did, that the daughter of the house, Constance Kent, was the criminal. Collins ignored the official solution in favour of "the notions of somnambulism, unconscious deeds, double selves that the Road case had aroused, the dizzying whirl of perspectives that had been brought to bear upon the investigation."

An anonymous review in The Times, published on 3 October 1868, highlighted the role of Sergeant Cuff:

"Cuff is the inevitable detective, a character apparently so regularly retained on the establishment of sensational novelists that it would be convenient for a due appreciation of their new works to find appended to advertisements of them, along with extracts from critical journals, such remarks as 'Very true to life' and the like, dated from Scotland Yard. We cannot afford to love the police-court flavour these characters infuse into modern tales. But 'the great' Sergeant Cuff would almost reconcile one to the type."
