= Godfrey Ablewhite =

- Created by: Wilkie Collins

In-universe information
- Gender: Male
- Family: Mr Ablewhite, Senior (father); Caroline Ablewhite (mother); 3 sisters
- Relatives: Lord Herncastle (grandfather); Arthur Herncastle (uncle); John Herncastle (uncle); Adelaide Blake (aunt); Lady Julia Verinder (aunt); Franklin Blake (cousin); two Blake children (cousins); Rachel Verinder (cousin)
- Nationality: British

Godfrey Ablewhite is a character in Wilkie Collins' 1868 novel The Moonstone. A vocal philanthropist, he is one of the rival suitors of Rachel Verinder, to whom he is briefly engaged before his mercenary motives are revealed.

== Religiosity challenged? ==
Godfrey is explicitly and repeatedly linked to Exeter Hall, site of the most theatrical elements in evangelical preaching: "Exeter Hall again....the performance with the tongue". His unmasking as the villain of the piece has therefore been taken by some as a literal demonstration on the author's part of the hypocrisy inherent in sermonising - the gap between words preached and actual actions. Others, however, point out that Collins has softened his attack on Victorian morality in at least two ways: he changed his mind about making Ablewhite (initially) a member of the clergy; and, by making him an overt hypocrite, philanthropist by day, philanderer by night, he distracted attention from the inherent hypocrisy in the moralistic position.

The result is to leave Godfrey as a rather bland, externalised figure - though arguably one who serves the book's purposes as villain rather better than did the more flamboyant Count Fosco in The Woman in White.

== See also ==
- Alter ego
- Dr. Jekyll and Mr. Hyde
- Miss Clack
