= Tamanna (1942 film) =

- Directed by: Phani Majumdar
- Produced by: Chimanlal Trivedi
- Starring: Leela Desai; P. Jairaj; Karan Dewan; K. C. Dey
- Cinematography: Bibhuti Laha
- Music by: Manna Dey; K. C. Dey
- Production company: Laxmi Productions
- Distributed by: Supreme Film Distributors
- Release date: 20 June 1942
- Country: India
- Language: Hindi

Tamanna is a Bollywood film. It was released in 1942. The film was directed by Phani Majumdar, who also wrote the screenplay, for the Laxmi Productions Ltd. banner. This was the first film from the Laxmi banner, which had been started by Chimanlal Trivedi who earlier headed Circo Productions. Tamanna was also the renowned dancer, Leela Desai's, first film in Bombay. The main cast included Leela Desai, P. Jairaj, Karan Dewan, Jagdish Sethi and K. C. Dey, who besides acting, composed the music. S. K. Kalla wrote the dialogue and lyrics.

Leela Desai, had previously worked in films made in Calcutta, like Vidyapati (1937), President (1937), Kapal Kundala (1939), Nartaki (1940) and Jiban Maran (1940). Nargis and Suraiya appeared as the child actresses in the film and "charmed the audiences".

The story revolves around two people, Ramesh and Uma, who are in love with each other. Uma forgoes her love for Ramesh in order to help him fulfill his mission by marrying someone else.

== Plot ==
Ramesh (P. Jairaj) is a straightforward young man with a desire to help mankind. He works as an engineer in a mill, and is interested in inventive research. Half his income is spent on that, and the rest on the betterment of the villagers. Uma (Leela Desai), is a wealthy young girl and lives with her brother, who is a Professor. She can not avail of money entitled to her till she gets married. Uma and Ramesh meet when they share a taxi. They soon fall in love but Ramesh's ideals come in the way. Uma marries someone else in order to procure the money for Ramesh to fulfill his mission.

== Cast ==
=== Main Cast ===
- Leela Desai as Uma
- Jairaj as Ramesh
- Jagdish Shethi as Arabind
- K. C. Dey as Ramdas
- Shanta Kumari as Shanti
- Karan Dewan as Anupam
- Shankerlal as Mr. Mehta
- Majid as Chimanbhoy

=== Supporting cast ===
- Suraiya as Baby Suraiya
- Nargis as Baby Rani
- Kashinath as Kashinath

== Review ==
In his review of Tamanna, Baburao Patel, editor of the cine-magazine Filmindia of August 1948, commented, "The fundamental defect in the picture is the poor story, poorly presented". He put the blame of this on director Phani Majumdar. He praised Leela Desai, Jairaj, and Jagdish, with a special mention for K. C. Dey's acting "K. C. Dey attracts attention with his emotional work in certain tense moments".

== Soundtrack ==
The music was composed by Manna Dey and the background score composed by K. C. Dey with lyrics by S. K. Kalla.

=== Song list ===
#	Title
1	"Rani Meri Rani Hai"
2	"Jaago Aayi Usha"
3	"Hoshiyar Musafir Ab Na Chalega"
4	"Kaan Mere Kuch Sunte Hain"
5	"Bhabhi Bhool Kar Ke Dekh"
6	"Jo Teri Awaaz Pe Koi Na Aave"
7	"Hai Kaun Des Tumhara Musafir"
8	"Ri Mere Paar Nikas Gaya"
9	"Yun Yaad Mein Tumhari Dil"
10	"Aao Aao Door Se Aao"
