= Birendranath Sircar =

Indian film producer (1901–1980)

B. N. Sircar (Birendranath Sircar)
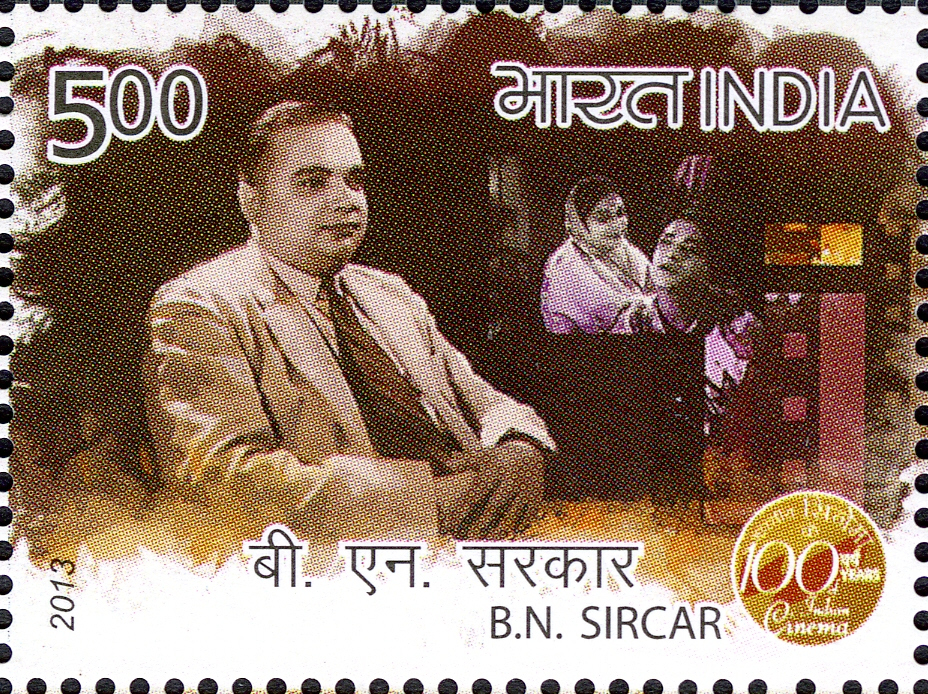
- Sircar on a 2013 stamp of India

President of Eastern India Motion Picture Association
- Incumbent
- Assumed office 1948
- Preceded by: Anadinath Bose
- Succeeded by: M D Chatterjee
- In office 1951–1952
- Preceded by: M D Chatterjee
- Succeeded by: M D Chatterjee
- Born: 5 July 1901; Bhagalpur, Bengal Presidency, British India
- Died: 28 November 1980 (aged 79); Calcutta, West Bengal, India
- Citizenship: India
- Education: University of London
- Occupation: film producer
- Parent: Nripendra Nath Sircar (father)
- Relatives: Peary Charan Sarkar (great-grandfather)
- Awards: Padma Bhushan (1972) Dada Saheb Phalke Award (1970)

Birendranath Sircar (also Sarkar; 5 July 1901 – 28 November 1980) was an Indian film producer and the founder of New Theatres Calcutta. He made Bengali-language films that were noted for introducing many film directors who later became famous. He was awarded the Dada Saheb Phalke Award in 1970 and the third highest civilian award in India, the Padma Bhushan, in 1972.

== Early life ==
B. N. Sircar was born in Bhagalpur to the then Advocate-General of Bengal, Sir Nripendra Nath Sircar. He was the grandson of Nagendra Nath Sircar, and great-grandson of Peary Charan Sarkar, the principal of Hare School, Calcutta. After completing his study at Hindu School, Kolkata, he studied engineering at the University of London was asked to build a cinema upon returning to India. The project caused him to develop a keen interest in film, and he proceeded to build a cinema for the screening of Bengali-language films. Dubbed "Chitra", the cinema was opened in Calcutta by Subhas Chandra Bose on 30 December 1930 and was followed by the construction of New Cinema, which showed Hindi films. Sircar then decided to involve himself in the making of two silent films.

== Career ==
On 10 February 1931, he founded New Theatres Calcutta. He was the president of the BMPA in the late 1940s

== Filmography ==
Sircar's films include:

- Dena Paona (Released 30 December 1931) – Directed by Premankur Atarthi
- Natir Puja (Released 22 March 1932)
- Punarjanma (Released 2 April 1932) – Directed by Premankur Atarthi
- Mohabbat Ke Ansu Urdu, (Released 1932) – Directed by Premankur Atarthi
- Zinda Lash Urdu, (Released 1932) – Directed by Premankur Atarthi
- Chirakumar Sabha (Released 28 May 1932) – Directed by Premankur Atarthi
- Pallisamaj (Released 1 July 1932) – Directed by Sisir Bhaduri
- Chandidas (Released 24 September 1932) – Directed by Debaki Bose
- Kapalkundala (Released 20 May 1933) – Directed by Premankur Atarthi
- Mastuto Bhai (short) (Released 20 May 1933) – Directed by Dhirendranath Gangopadhyay
- Sita (Released 26 October 1933) – Directed by Sisir Bhaduri
- Mirabai (Released 11 November 1933) – Directed by Debaki Bose
- Excuse Me Sir (short) (Released 30 March 1934) – Directed by Dhirendranath Gangopadhyay
- Ruplekha (Released 14 April 1934) – Directed by P.C. Barua
- P.Brothers (Cartoon) (Released 23 June 1934) – Directed by Raichand Boral
- Mahua (Released 31 August 1934) – Directed by Hiren Bose
- Devdas (Released 30 March 1935) – Directed by Nitin Bose
- Abaseshe (short) (Released 24 August 1935) – Directed by Dineshranjan Das
- Bhagyachakra (Released 3 October 1935) – Directed by Nitin Bose
- Grihadaha (Released 10 October 1936) – Directed by P.C. Barua
- Mando Ki (short) (Released 21 October 1936) – Directed by Tulsi Lahiri
- Maya (Released 23 December 1936) – Directed by P.C. Barua
- Didi (Released 3 April 1937) – Directed by Nitin Bose
- Mukti (Released 18 September 1937) – Directed by P.C. Barua
- Arghya (short) (Released 25 September 1937)
- Bidyapati (Released 2 April 1938) – Directed by Debaki Bose
- Abhignan (Released 11 June 1938) – Directed by Prafulla Ray
- Desher mati (Released 17 August 1938) – Directed by Nitin Bose
- Achinpriya (Released 29 October 1938) – Directed by Dhirendranath Gangopadhyay
- Sathi (Released 3 December 1938) – Directed by Phani Majumdar
- Adhikar (Released 12 January 1939) – Directed by P.C. Barua
- Baradidi (Released 7 April 1939) – Directed by Amar Mullik
- Sapure (Released 27 May 1939) – Directed by Debaki Bose
- Rajat Jayanti (Released 12 August 1939) – Directed by P.C. Barua
- Jiban Maran (Released 14 October 1939) – Directed by Nitin Bose
- Parajoy (Released 22 March 1940) – Directed by Hemchandra Chandra
- Daktar (Released 31 August 1940) – Directed by Phani Majumdar
- Abhinetri (Released 30 November 1940) – Directed by Amar Mullik
- Nartaki (Released 18 January 1941) – Directed by Debaki Bose
- Parichoy (Released 25 April 1941) – Directed by Nitin Bose
- Pratishruti (Released 14 August 1941) – Directed by Hemchandra Chandra
- Shodhbodh (Released 28 March 1942) – Directed by Soumen Mukhopadhyay
- Minakshi (Released 12 June 1942) – Directed by Madhu Bose
- Priyo Bandhabi (Released 23 January 1943) – Directed by Soumen Mukhopadhyay
- Kashinath (Released 2 April 1943) – Directed by Nitin Bose
- Dikshul (Released 12 June 1943) – Directed by Premankur Atarthi
- Udayer Pathey (Released 1 September 1944) – Directed by Bimal Roy
- Dui Purush (Released 30 August 1945) – Directed by Subodh Mitra
- Biraj Bou (Released 5 July 1946) – Directed by Amar Mullik
- Nurse Sisi (Released 27 April 1947) – Directed by Subodh Mitra
- Ramer Sumati (Released 24 December 1947) – Directed by Kartik Chattopadhyay
- Pratibad (Released 19 June 1948) – Directed by Hemchandra Chandra
- Anjangarh (Released 24 September 1948) – Directed by Bimal Roy
- Mantramugdha (Released 14 January 1949) – Directed by Bimal Roy
- Bishnupriya (Released 7 October 1949) – Directed by Hemchandra Chandra
- Rupkatha (Released 13 October 1950) – Directed by Soren Sen
- Aadur Prem, 2011 – Directed by Somnath Gupta

== See also ==
- Cinema of India
- B.N. Sircar : भारतीय सिनेमा के विकास की बुनियाद के एक सर्जक
