= Umasashi =

Indian film actress

Uma Sashi
- Born: 1915; Calcutta, Bengal Presidency, British India
- Died: 6 December 2000 (aged 84–85); Kolkata, West Bengal, India
- Occupations: Actor; singer; dancer
- Spouse: Mr Guru Prasad Dev
- Children: Gouranga Narayan, Soumendra Narayan, Sourendra Narayan, Kanaklata,
- Parents: Nilmani Chattopadhyay (father); Radharani Chattopadhyay (mother)

Uma Sashi (1915 – 6 December 2000) was an Indian Bengali film actress who appeared in many roles from 1929 to 1951. Her on-screen pairings with actors such as Durgadas Bannerjee, K. L. Saigal, Pahari Sanyal and Prithviraj Kapoor were popular in those days.

== Early life ==
Uma Sashi was born in 1915 in a poor Brahmin family of Calcutta. Her father, Nilmani Chattopadhyay, originally came from Dhaka, East Bengal, British India, but later settled in Calcutta. He was a Kirtan artist and sometimes acted as a Jatra artist in a local Jatra group. As a child, Uma received very little formal education in a local school due to poverty. She received dance and music training from the age of four. Miss Satkari Ganguly was her first music and dance teacher. As Satkari Ganguly was herself an actress, she introduced Uma Sashi to the stage and theatre, where she started work as a group dancer in theatrical plays like Minerva, Alfred and Russa. Soon after, she started playing minor roles and became a part of a touring Jatra group from Kolkata to different parts of undivided Bengal like Chittagong, Cox's Bazar etc. She was a perfectionist and received elocution lessons from several Hindi, Urdu and English tutors to perfect pronunciation of these languages. After her Debut in Bangabala a silent movie she had to quit the stage because the authorities would not allow their paid staff to work in films.

== Career ==
Uma Sashi started as an actor in the silent movie Bangabala. The other silent films she acted in are Bigraha (1930) and Abhishek (1931). During this time she started recording songs for Columbia Records (India) and then to Hindusthan Musical Products as Smt. Uma Devi. Uma Sashi appeared in many silent movies as an actor. In 1931, She appeared in the first Bengali language sound film, Dena Paona (1931),(Bengali: দেনা পাওনা) which was a major hit. In this movie she acted in a crowd scene of Gajan and also sang a song “ Baba Apan Bhola Moder Pagal Chhele “ along with Miss Abhavati. She received training in singing from the legendary music director Pankaj Kumar Mallick and recorded songs such as 'Duniya rang rangili baba' with him for the movie Dharti Mata. Uma Sashi 's first leading role was in Chandidas(1932) movie of New Theatres where she played the role of Rami.

== Personal life ==
Uma Sashi married Mr Guru Prasad Dev, an attorney by profession, and a member of the Shobhabazar Rajbari when she was at the top of her career. In those days it was not easy for a glamorous actress to become a member of such a conservative family. So she had to wait for quite some time to allowed into the ancestral house of Mr Guru Prasad Dev. Uma Sashi was Guru Prasad Dev's second wife and had to share the house of her husband with his first wife. Later she becomes a mother of three sons and a daughter. After her marriage she mostly remained outside the film industry. In her later years, Uma Sashi occasionally gave interviews in the print and electronic media and attended film functions, on rare occasions.

== Death ==
Uma Sashi died on 6 December 2000. The news of her death only came to light in the media a few days later.

== Awards and nominations ==
She attended BFJA award giving ceremony as a chief guest. She got the Hero Honda award as the living legend in 2000.

== Filmography ==
- Bangabala (1929)
- Abhishek (1931)
- Chandidas Bng (1932)
- Bhagya Laxmi (1932)
- Bishnu Maaya (1932)
- Bishnu Priya
- Dena Paona
- Puran Bhagat (1933)
- Kapalkundala (1933)
- Chandidas (1934)
- Mohabbat Ki Kasauti (Hindi) / Roop Lekha (Bengali) (1934)
- Daku Mansoor (1934)
- Dhoop Chhaon (1935)
- Bhagya Chakra (1935)
- Anath Ashram (1937)
- Lehari Lutera (1937)
- Dharti Mata (1938) (Hindi) / Desher Mati (Bengali) (1938)
- Leela (1947) (STORY WRITER) (screenwriter)
- Jai Bhim (as Uma) (1949)
- Deedar (1951)
