= Dadasaheb Phalke Award =

India's highest cinema award

- Anant Nag is the most recent winner
- Awarded for: "Outstanding contribution to the growth and development of Indian cinema"
- Sponsored by: Directorate of Film Festivals
- Rewards: Swarna Kamal (Golden Lotus); Shawl; ₹1,000,000 (US$11,000)
- Most recent winner: Anant Nag

Highlights
- Total awarded: 56
- First winner: Devika Rani
- Website: nfaindia.org

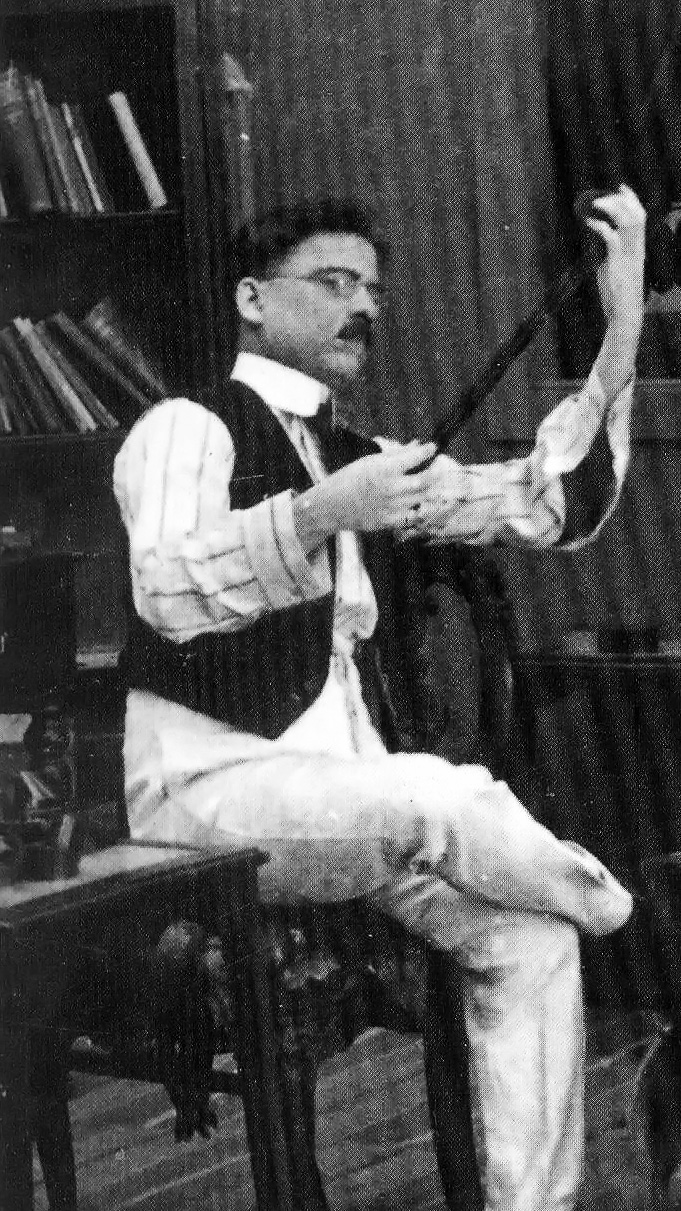
Dadasaheb Phalke, often credited as "The Father of Indian Cinema", made India's first full-length feature, Raja Harishchandra (1913).

The Dadasaheb Phalke Award is India's highest award in the field of cinema, given by the Government of India and presented annually at the National Film Awards. The recipient is honoured for their "outstanding contribution to the growth and development of Indian cinema", and is selected by a committee consisting of eminent personalities from the Indian film industry. The award comprises a Swarna Kamal (Golden Lotus) medallion, a shawl, and a cash prize of ₹15 lakh (US$16,000).

Presented first in 1969, the award was introduced by the Government of India to commemorate Dadasaheb Phalke's contribution to Indian cinema. Phalke (1870–1944), who is popularly known as and often regarded as "the father of Indian cinema", was an Indian filmmaker who directed India's first full-length feature film, Raja Harishchandra (1913).

The first recipient of the award was actress Devika Rani, who was honoured at the 17th National Film Awards. As of 2026, there have been 56 awardees. Among those, actors Prithviraj Kapoor (1971) and Vinod Khanna (2017) are the only posthumous recipients. Kapoor's actor-filmmaker son, Raj Kapoor, accepted the award on his behalf at the 19th National Film Awards in 1971 and was also himself a recipient in 1987 at the 35th National Film Awards ceremony. (Note: In 1972, Raj Kapoor received the posthumous award given to his father, Prithviraj Kapoor. However, on 1 May 1988, when he was being conferred the award by the then President of India, R. Venkataraman, Kapoor had an asthmatic attack and was rushed in the President's ambulance. Kapoor died a month later on 2 June 1988.)

Recipients include several pairs of siblings who received this award in different years, for example: B. N. Reddy (1974) and B. Nagi Reddy (1986); Raj Kapoor (1987) and Shashi Kapoor (2014); Lata Mangeshkar (1989) and Asha Bhosle (2000); B. R. Chopra (1998) and Yash Chopra (2001). The most recent recipient (2024) is actor Anant Nag, who was honoured at the 72nd National Film Awards ceremony on 22 September 2026 by the President of India, Droupadi Murmu.

== Recipients ==
List of award recipients by year
Year (Ceremony)	Image	Recipient	Film industry	Notes
1969 (17th NFA)		Devika Rani	Hindi	Widely acknowledged as "the first lady of Indian cinema", the actress debuted in Karma (1933), which was the first Indian English-language film and the first Indian film to feature an on-screen kiss. She also founded the first Indian public limited film company, Bombay Talkies, in 1934.
1970 (18th NFA )		Birendranath Sircar	Bengali	The founder of two production companies, International Filmcraft and New Theatres, Sircar is considered to be one of the pioneers of Indian cinema. He also built two cinema theatres in Calcutta, one for screening Bengali films and one for Hindi films.
1971 (19th NFA)		Prithviraj Kapoor (Note: Prithviraj Kapoor died on 29 May 1972, at the age of 65. He was posthumously awarded for the year 1971.)	Hindi	Kapoor began his acting career in theatres and starred in India's first sound film, Alam Ara (1931). He founded Prithvi Theatre, a travelling theatre company in 1944 "to promote Hindi stage productions".
1972 (20th NFA)		Pankaj Mullick	• Bengali • Hindi	A composer, singer and actor, Mullick began his career providing background music by conducting live orchestras during the screening of silent films. He is best known for Mahishasuramardini, a radio musical composed in 1931.
1973 (21st NFA)		Ruby Myers (Sulochana)	Hindi	One of the highest-paid actresses of her time, Sulochana made her debut with Veer Bala (1925) and is considered to be "the first sex symbol of Indian cinema".
1974 (22nd NFA)		B. N. Reddy	Telugu	The director of fifteen feature films in Telugu, Reddy was the first Indian film personality to be honoured with a Doctor of Letters and also the first to receive the Padma Bhushan, the third-highest civilian award in India.
1975 (23rd NFA)		Dhirendra Nath Ganguly	Bengali	Considered one of the founders of the Bengali film industry, Ganguly debuted as an actor in Bilat Ferat (1921). He established three production companies – Indo British Film Company (1918), Lotus Film Company (1922) and British Dominion Films Studio (1929) – to direct several Bengali films.
1976 (24th NFA)		Kanan Devi	Bengali	Acknowledged as "the first lady of Bengali cinema", Kanan Devi made her acting debut in silent films in the 1920s. She also sang songs written by Rabindranath Tagore and was a producer with her film company, Shrimati Pictures.
1977 (25th NFA)		Nitin Bose	• Bengali • Hindi	A cinematographer, director and screenwriter, Bose is noted for introducing playback singing to Indian cinema in 1935 through his Bengali film Bhagya Chakra and its Hindi remake Dhoop Chhaon.
1978 (26th NFA)		Raichand Boral	• Bengali • Hindi	Considered one of the pioneers of Indian film music, Boral was a music director who, in collaboration with director Nitin Bose, introduced the system of playback singing in Indian cinema.
1979 (27th NFA)		Sohrab Modi	Hindi	An actor and filmmaker, Modi is credited with bringing Shakespearean classics to Indian cinema and was noted for his delivery of Urdu dialogue.
1980 (28th NFA)		Paidi Jairaj	Hindi	Initially having worked as a body double, actor-director Jairaj is known for his portrayal of Indian historical characters and was involved in instituting the Filmfare Awards.
1981 (29th NFA)		Naushad	Hindi	Music director Naushad debuted with Prem Nagar (1940), and is credited with introducing the technique of sound mixing to Indian cinema.
1982 (30th NFA)		L. V. Prasad	• Telugu • Tamil • Hindi	Actor-director-producer L. V. Prasad has the distinction of acting in the first talkie films produced in three languages: the Hindi Alam Ara, Tamil Kalidas and Telugu Bhakta Prahlada, all released in 1931. He founded Prasad Studios in 1965 and the Colour Film Laboratory in 1976. Prasad Studios has produced over 150 films in various Indian languages.
1983 (31st NFA)		Durga Khote	• Hindi • Marathi	Having acted in the first Marathi-language talkie Ayodhyecha Raja (1932), Khote is considered a pioneer among women in Indian cinema. She set up two production companies, Fact Films and Durga Khote Productions, which produced short films and documentaries.
1984 (32nd NFA)		Satyajit Ray	Bengali	Having debuted as a director with Pather Panchali (1955), filmmaker Satyajit Ray is credited with bringing world recognition to Indian cinema.
1985 (33rd NFA)		V. Shantaram	• Hindi • Marathi	Actor and filmmaker V. Shantaram produced and directed India's first colour film, Sairandhri (1931). He also produced and directed the first Marathi-language talkie, Ayodhyecha Raja (1932), and was associated with nearly 100 films over 50 years.
1986 (34th NFA)		B. Nagi Reddy	Telugu	Reddy produced more than 50 films, beginning in the 1950s. He established Vijaya Vauhini Studios which was at the time the biggest film studio in Asia.
1987 (35th NFA)		Raj Kapoor	Hindi	Often revered as "The Show Man", actor and filmmaker Kapoor's performance in the Hindi film Awara (1951) was ranked as one of the top ten greatest performances of all time by Time magazine in 2010.
1988 (36th NFA)		Ashok Kumar	Hindi	Popularly known as "Dadamoni" (the grand old man), Kumar is noted for his roles in Achhut Kannya (1936), Bandhan (1940) and Kismet (1943), the first blockbuster in Indian cinema.
1989 (37th NFA)		Lata Mangeshkar	• Hindi • Marathi	Widely credited as the "Nightingale of India", playback singer Mangeshkar started her career in 1942 and sang songs in over 36 languages.
1990 (38th NFA)		Akkineni Nageswara Rao	Telugu	Having debuted in Dharma Patni (1941), Akkineni Nageswara Rao acted in more than 250 films, mostly in the Telugu language.
1991 (39th NFA)		Bhalji Pendharkar	Marathi	Filmmaker Bhalji Pendharkar started his career in the 1920s and produced more than 60 Marathi films and eight Hindi films. He has been widely recognised for the historical and social narratives depicted in these films.
1992 (40th NFA)		Bhupen Hazarika	Assamese	Popularly referred to as "the Bard of Brahmaputra", musician Hazarika is best known for his folk songs and ballads sung in the Assamese language.
1993 (41st NFA)		Majrooh Sultanpuri	Hindi	Lyricist Sultanpuri penned his first Hindi song for Shahjehan (1946) and wrote around 8000 songs for over 350 Hindi films.
1994 (42nd NFA)		Dilip Kumar	Hindi	Debuting in Jwar Bhata (1944), the "Tragedy King" Dilip Kumar acted in more than 60 Hindi films in a career that spanned over six decades.
1995 (43rd NFA)		Rajkumar	Kannada	In a career spanning over 45 years, Rajkumar acted in more than 200 Kannada-language films and also won a National Film Award for Best Male Playback Singer in 1992.
1996 (44th NFA)		Sivaji Ganesan	Tamil	Ganesan debuted as an actor in Parasakthi (1952) and went on to appear in more than 300 films. Known for his "expressive and resonant voice", Ganesan was the first Indian film actor to win a "Best Actor" award in an International film festival, the Afro-Asian Film Festival held in Cairo, Egypt in 1960. Upon his death, The Los Angeles Times described him as "the Marlon Brando of south India's film industry".
1997 (45th NFA)		Kavi Pradeep	Hindi	Best known for the patriotic song "Aye Mere Watan Ke Logo", lyricist Pradeep wrote around 1700 songs, hymns and fiery nationalistic poems, including the lyrics for more than 80 Hindi films.
1998 (46th NFA)		B. R. Chopra	Hindi	Filmmaker B. R. Chopra established his own production house, B. R. Films, in 1956, and is best known for the films such as Naya Daur (1957) and Hamraaz (1967), as well as the TV series Mahabharat based on the similarly titled epic of Hindu literature.
1999 (47th NFA)		Hrishikesh Mukherjee	Hindi	Having directed 45 Hindi films, filmmaker Mukherjee is credited with popularising "middle-of-the-road cinema" through films like Anuradha (1960), Anand (1971) and Gol Maal (1979).
2000 (48th NFA)		Asha Bhosle	• Hindi • Marathi	A playback singer of "extraordinary range and versatility", Bhosle began her singing career in 1943.
2001 (49th NFA)		Yash Chopra	Hindi	The founder of Yash Raj Films, Chopra debuted as a director with Dhool Ka Phool (1959). He directed 22 Hindi films.
2002 (50th NFA)		Dev Anand	Hindi	Widely revered as "evergreen star of Hindi cinema", actor and filmmaker Anand co-founded Navketan Films in 1949 and produced 35 films.
2003 (51st NFA)		Mrinal Sen	• Bengali • Hindi	Regarded as one of "India's most important filmmakers", Sen debuted as a director with Raat Bhore (1955) and made 27 films in 50 years.
2004 (52nd NFA)		Adoor Gopalakrishnan	Malayalam	Credited with pioneering the new wave cinema movement in Malayalam cinema, director Adoor Gopalakrishnan won the National Film Award for Best Direction for his debut film, Swayamvaram (1972). He has been acclaimed for his "ability to portray complex problems in a simplistic way".
2005 (53rd NFA)		Shyam Benegal	Hindi	Benegal started his career by making advertising films. He directed his first feature film, Ankur, in 1973. His films have focused on women and their rights.
2006 (54th NFA)	(the award being received by his son)	Tapan Sinha	• Bengali • Hindi	Filmmaker Tapan Sinha debuted as a director in 1954 and made more than 40 feature films in the Bengali, Hindi and Oriya languages. Most of the films addressed problems faced by ordinary people.
2007 (55th NFA)		Manna Dey	• Bengali • Hindi	In a career spanning over five decades, playback singer Dey sang over 3500 songs in various Indian languages. He is also credited with "pioneering a new genre by infusing Indian classical music in a pop framework".
2008 (56th NFA)		V. K. Murthy	Hindi	Best known for his collaboration with director Guru Dutt, cinematographer Murthy shot India's first cinemascope film, Kaagaz Ke Phool (1959). He is best remembered for his lighting techniques in Pyaasa (1957) and the "beam shot" in Kaagaz Ke Phool is considered a classic in celluloid history.
2009 (57th NFA)		D. Ramanaidu	Telugu	In a career spanning over 50 years, D. Ramanaidu produced more than 130 films in various Indian languages but mostly Telugu. He features in The Guinness Book of World Records for having produced films in nine languages.
2010 (58th NFA)		K. Balachander	Tamil	Filmmaker K. Balachander debuted as a director with Neerkumizhi (1965). In a career that spanned over forty years, he directed and produced (through his production house, Kavithalayaa Productions, established in 1981) over 100 films in various Indian languages.
2011 (59th NFA)		Soumitra Chatterjee	Bengali	Best known for his frequent collaboration with director Satyajit Ray, Chatterjee debuted as an actor in Apur Sansar (1959) and worked with other directors, such as Mrinal Sen and Tapan Sinha, in a career spanning over 60 years. In 1999, he became the first Indian film personality to be conferred with Commandeur at the Ordre des Arts et des Lettres, France's highest award for artists.
2012 (60th NFA)		Pran	Hindi	Known for his "compelling and highly stylized performances", actor Pran mainly played villainous characters in Hindi films during a career spanning over 50 years.
2013 (61st NFA)		Gulzar	Hindi	Gulzar began his career as a lyricist for Bandini (1963) and debuted as a director with Mere Apne (1971). Known for his successful collaboration with music directors like R. D. Burman and A. R. Rahman, Gulzar won several awards for his lyrics in a career spanning over 50 years.
2014 (62nd NFA)		Shashi Kapoor	Hindi	The winner of two National Film Awards including Best Actor for New Delhi Times in 1985, Kapoor debuted as a child actor at the age of four in plays directed by his father Prithviraj Kapoor and later as a leading man in the 1961 film Dharmputra. In 1978, Kapoor set up his production house "Film Valas" and played a major role in reviving the Prithvi Theatre group, set up by his father.
2015 (63rd NFA)		Manoj Kumar	Hindi	Known for his image as the patriotic hero, Kumar debuted as an actor with the 1957 Hindi film Fashion. An actor and director of patriotic theme based movies, Kumar is fondly called "Bharat Kumar".
2016 (64th NFA)		K. Viswanath	Telugu	Viswanath started his career as a sound recordist. In a film career spanning sixty years, Vishwanath directed fifty-three feature films in a variety of genres, including films based on performing arts, visual arts, and aesthetics. Viswanath garnered five National Film Awards and received international recognition for his works.
2017 (65th NFA)	(the award being received by his family)	Vinod Khanna (Note: Vinod Khanna died on 27 April 2017, at the age of 70. He was posthumously awarded for the year 2017.)	Hindi	Debuting in Man Ka Meet (1968), Khanna was primarily known for his work as an actor in Hindi films during the 1970s. He took a brief break from films (1982–1987) and entered politics in 1997.
2018 (66th NFA)		Amitabh Bachchan	Hindi	Debuted in Saat Hindustani, Bachchan is often primarily known for his unique baritone voice and for his excellency in the field of acting. Referred to as the Shahenshah of Bollywood, he has appeared in over 200 Indian films in a career spanning more than five decades. He is regarded as one of the greatest and most influential actors in the history of Indian cinema as well as world cinema, to an extent that French director François Truffaut called him a "one-man industry".
2019 (67th NFA)		Rajinikanth	Tamil	Debuted in Apoorva Raagangal (1975), Rajinikanth is an Indian actor who works primarily in Tamil cinema where he is fondly referred to as superstar. He was honored with the Padma Bhushan (2000) and the Padma Vibhushan (2016) by the Government of India. He was awarded for the year 2019 in 2021 due to the COVID-19 pandemic.
2020 (68th NFA)		Asha Parekh	Hindi	Debuted in Maa (1952) as a child artist, Asha Parekh is an Indian actress who works primarily in Hindi cinema where she is fondly called Jubilee Girl. In addition to acting, she has also directed various television series in the early ages of satellite television in India. She was honoured with the Padma Shri (1992) by the Government of India. She was awarded for the year 2020 in 2022 due to the COVID-19 pandemic.
2021 (69th NFA)		Waheeda Rehman	Hindi	Waheeda Rehman made her acting debut with the Telugu film Rojulu Marayi (1955). She has featured in the films CID (1956), Pyaasa (1957), Kaagaz Ke Phool (1959), Chaudhvin Ka Chand (1960), Guide (1965), Khamoshi (1969), Reshma Aur Shera (1971), Phagun (1973), Kabhi Kabhie (1976), Chandni (1989), Lamhe (1991), Rang De Basanti (2006), and Delhi 6 (2009). Waheeda Rehman was conferred with the Padma Shri in 1972 and Padma Bhushan in 2011 by the Government of India. Waheeda Rehman was last seen in Skater Girl (2021).
2022 (70th NFA)		Mithun Chakraborty	• Hindi • Bengali	Mithun Chakraborty started his film career in 1976 with Mrigayaa, which won him the National Award for Best Actor. The 1990s saw him winning two National awards and Filmfare Awards each, followed by another two Filmfare Awards in the 2020s. With several career fluctuations, Mithun Chakraborty has reinvented himself by successfully dabbling not only between cinema of different languages but also Hindi and Bengali television. He was last seen in the film Shastri which coincidentally released on the day he was awarded the Dadasaheb Phalke Award.
2023 (71st NFA)		Mohanlal	Malayalam	Mohanlal began his acting career in 1978 at age 18 with Thiranottam. Over the course of more than four decades, he has appeared in over 360 films, predominantly in Malayalam cinema. His artistry has been recognized with five National Film Awards, including two for Best Actor, a Special Jury Award, a Special Mention, and as a producer for Best Feature Film—and nine Kerala State Film Awards. In recognition of his contributions to Indian cinema, the Government of India conferred upon him the Padma Shri in 2001 and the Padma Bhushan in 2019. Beyond acting, Mohanlal has contributed as a producer, distributor, playback singer, and director.
2024 (72nd NFA)		Anant Nag	Kannada	Across five decades, Anant Nag has been one of Kannada cinema’s most versatile and enduring stars. From Ankur, Hamsageethe and Manthan to Minchina Ota, Naa Ninna Bidalaare, Ganeshana Maduve, Gauri Ganesha and Godhi Banna Sadharana Mykattu, he moved effortlessly between art cinema, romance, comedy and character roles. A four-time Karnataka State Best Actor, six-time Filmfare Kannada winner, and the recipient of the Padma Bhushan, Nag remains beloved across generations.

Dadasaheb Phalke Award
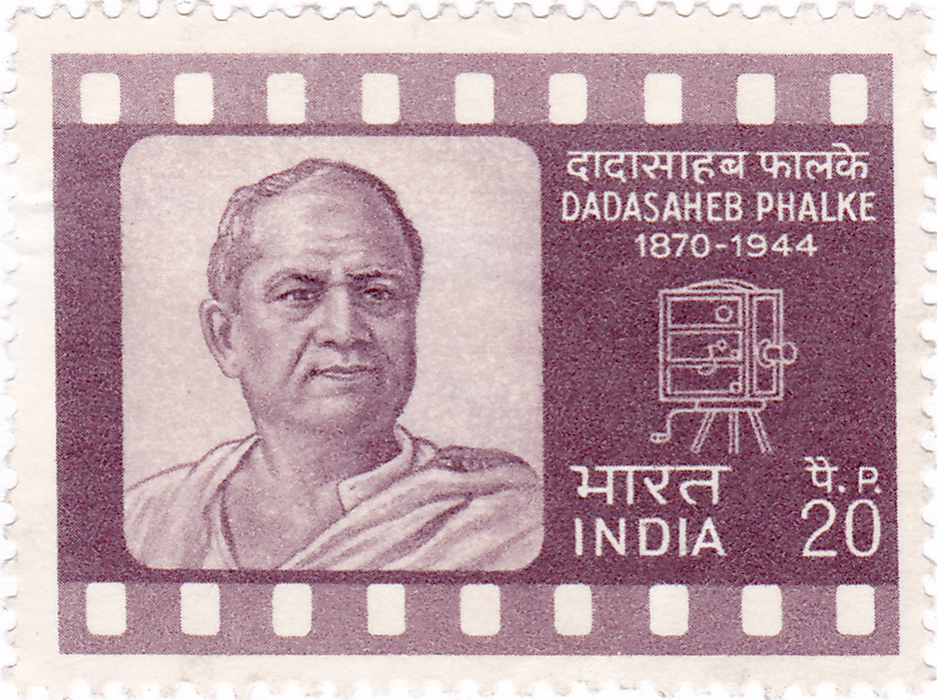
- A commemorative postage stamp on Dadasaheb Phalke 1870-1944
- Type: Commemorative
- Country of issue: India
- Date of issue: 30 April 1971
- Face value: 20 Paise

== Similarly named awards ==
Several other awards and film festivals have been named after Dadasaheb Phalke, sometimes leading to confusion. Such awards include the Dadasaheb Phalke International Film Festival, Dadasaheb Phalke Film Foundation Awards, Dadasaheb Phalke Excellence Awards, etc. which are unrelated to the award conferred by the Directorate of Film Festivals. Some prominent filmmakers, such as Shyam Benegal, have proposed the Government of India step in to prevent such use of the Dadasaheb Phalke name but the Information and Broadcasting ministry has said it could not do so since the names of the new awards are not an exact copy.

== Trivia ==
- Prithviraj Kapoor, Raj Kapoor and Shashi Kapoor are the only father and sons to have received the Dadasaheb Phalke Award.
- Oldest winner : Bhalji Pendharkar (aged 95)
- Youngest winner : Lata Mangeshkar (aged 60)

== Bibliography ==
- Gulzar; Nihalani, Govind; Chatterjee, Saibal, eds. (2003). Encyclopaedia of Hindi Cinema. Popular Prakashan. ISBN 978-81-7991-066-5. Archived from the original on 11 January 2023.
