= Nartaki (1940 film) =

1940 Hindi film directed by Debaki Bose

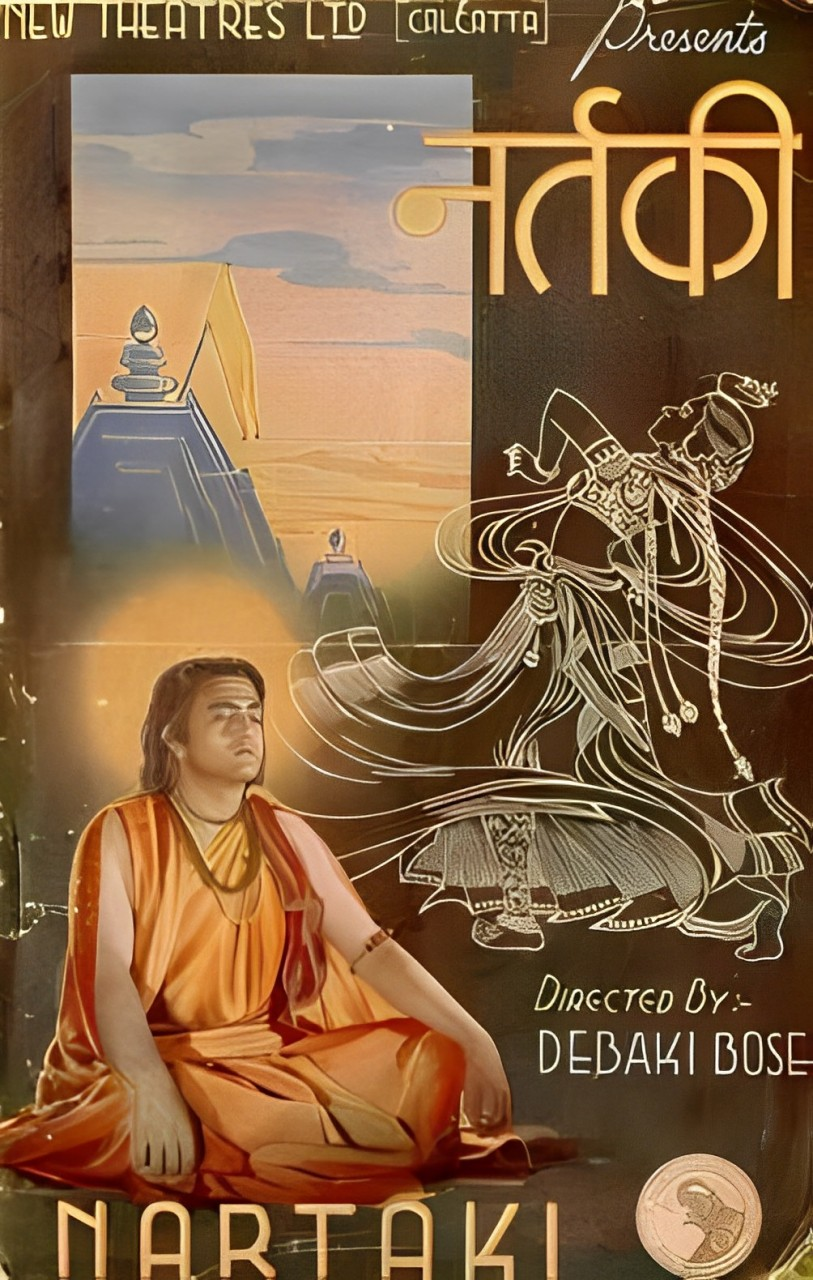
- Song synopsis booklet cover
- Directed by: Debaki Bose
- Written by: Debaki Bose
- Starring: Leela Desai; Najmul Hussain; Wasti; Jagdish Sethi
- Cinematography: Yusuf Mulji
- Music by: Pankaj Mullick
- Release date: 24 December 1940
- Running time: 150 minutes
- Country: India
- Languages: Hindi, Bengali
- Box office: ₹36 lakh

Nartaki (Dancer) is a 1940 film directed by Debaki Bose for New Theatres Ltd, Calcutta. A bilingual made in Hindi and in Bengali, it had story and screenplay written by Bose, with cinematography by Yusuf Mulji. Music was composed by Pankaj Mullick. The cast had actress Leela Desai playing the title role of Nartaki. Najam also called Najam-Ul-Hasain or Najmul Hussain had left Bombay Talkies following his affair and elopement with Devika Rani, had now joined New Theatres Ltd, where he was cast in films like Anath Ashram (1937), Dushman (1939), Kapal Kundala (1939), and Nartaki. The rest of the main cast included Jagdish Sethi, Wasti and Pankaj Mullick in the Hindi version.

The story was a sixteenth century period costume drama about a courtesan who with the help of the king tries to avenge her insult against the priest of a temple monastery.

== Plot ==
Roopkumari (Leela Desai) a famous court dancer is forbidden entry into a temple monastery run by a strict disciplinarian Priest, Gyananandji (Wasti), who demands celibacy from his monks. To avenge her insult she gets the help of the king but fails in her mission to enter the temple. She then tries to seduce the priest’s son, Satyasundar, who is set to take the main priest’s place as the chief priest. Roopkumari and Satyasundar fall in love and the priest turns his son out of the monastery. Roopkumari takes him to her house and nurses the now ill Satyasundar back to health. In the process she too undergoes a spiritual transformation, looking for a divine love. Satyasundar finally leaves Roopkumari and returns to the monastery.

== Cast ==
=== Hindi ===
Cast:

- Leela Desai as the dancer Roopkumari
- Najam as Satyasundar
- Jagdish Sethi as Seth Hiralal
- Wasti as Gyananandji
- Pankaj Mullick as Kaviraj
- R. P. Kapoor as Swamiji
- Nand Kishore as Bhootnath
- Rajani Rani as Ganga
- Kalabati as Jumna
- Bikram Kapoor
- Panna Kapoor
- Mohammed Siddique

=== Bengali ===
Cast:

- Leela Desai as Roopkumari the dancer
- Bhanu Bannerjee as Satyasundar
- Chhabi Biswas as Swamiji
- Sailen Chowdhury as Seth Hiralal
- Utpal Sen as Sage Gyananando
- Pankaj Mullick as Kabi
- Indu Mukherjee as Bhoothnath
- Naresh Bose as Kishore
- Jyoti as jamuna

== Reception ==
The film was released on 24 December 1940 at Minerva Cinema, Bombay. In the Bombay Calling column of Filmindia, January 1940, mention was made of a Gujarati journal being mishandled during the shooting of the film at the studios. Baburao Patel, editor of Filmindia commented on taking bodyguard of girls with him to protect him from Debaki Bose, who had newly arrived in Bombay from Calcutta.

The review of Nartaki by Baburao Patel titled, "Debaki Bose Runs Amok", described the story as "too poor in development and almost beggarly in intellectual conception". The cast was criticised for their disappointing performances except for Wasti, who played the master monk. Yusuf Mulji's camera-work was commended as was the music score by Pankaj Mullick.

The film went on to become a commercial success as the fifth highest-grossing film of the year, and was recommended as one of the top films of 1940. It is cited as the first "major cinematic-essay" on a dancer's life.

== Soundtrack ==
With music composed by Pankaj Mullick who also appeared as Kaviraj in the film, it had lyrics by Arzu Lucknawi. One of the classic notable song was "Yeh Kaun Aaj Aaya Savere Savere" sung by Mullick. The other popular song, which helped him achieve "mass-appeal" was "Madabhari Rut Jawan Hai". The songs were sung by Leela Desai, Pankaj Mullick, and Radha Rani.

=== Songlist ===
| # | Title | Singer |
|---|---|---|
| 1 | "Madabhari Rut Jawaan Hai " | Pankaj Mullick |
| 2 | "Prem Ka Naata Chhuta" | Pankaj Mullick |
| 3 | "Aankh Mund Kar Dhyaan Murakh" | Leela Desai, Radha Rani |
| 4 | "Yeh Kaun Aaj Aaya Savere Savere" | Pankaj Mullick |
| 5 | "Rat Shiv Naam Ki Mala" | |
| 6 | "Teri Daya Se Aaj Muraad Mil Gayi" | Pankaj Mullick |
| 7 | "Kaun Tujhe Samjhave Murakh" | Pankaj Mullick |
| 8 | "Kaun Tujhe Samjhave Murakh" | Leela Desai |
