= Jiban Maran =

- Jiban Maran
- Directed by: Nitin Bose
- Written by: Nitin Bose, Binoy Chatterjee, Sailajananda Mukhopadhyay
- Produced by: New Theatres
- Starring: K. L. Saigal, Leela Desai, Devbala, Manorama, Elias Chowla, Boken Chattopadhyay, Bhanu Bandypadhyay, Indu Mukherjee, Naresh Bose, Sailen Choudhury, Nibhanani Devi, Satya Mukherjee, Amar Mullick
- Cinematography: Nitin Bose
- Edited by: Subodh Mitra
- Music by: Composer: Pankaj Mullick Lyricist: Munshi Arzoo
- Production company: New Theatres
- Release date: 1939
- Running time: 144 min
- Country: India
- Language: Bengali

Jiban Maran (Bengali জীবন মরণ, Life and Death) is a social drama film directed by Nitin Bose, made in 1939 in Bengali language and was remade in Hindi as Dushman, and was produced by New Theatres.

== Cast ==
- K. L. Saigal as Mohan
- Leela Desai as Geeta
- Bhanu Bandopadhyay as Dr. Bijoy
- Amar Mullick as Radio Manager Mr Sen
- Shailen Chowdhury as Sanitorium Chief Doctor Dr.Choudhury
- Indu Mukhopadyay as Geeta's Father
- Nivanani as Geets's mother
- Boken Chattopadhyay
- Jagdish Sethi
- Satya Mukherjee as Manager's assistant
- Shyam Laha
