= Samaanta =

- Directed by: Nitin Bose
- Release date: 1972
- Country: India
- Language: Hindi

Samaanta is a 1972 Bollywood drama film directed by Nitin Bose.

== Cast ==
- Ashoo
- Dheeraj Kumar
- Snehlata
