= Aankh Ki Sharm =

- Directed by: Balwant Bhatt
- Starring: Prithviraj Kapoor; Trilok Kapoor
- Release date: 1943
- Country: India
- Language: Hindi

Aankh Ki Sharm (lit. 'Shame of the eyes') is a 1943 Bollywood film.

== Cast ==
- Prithviraj Kapoor
- Trilok Kapoor
