= Milap (1937 film) =

- Rampyari and Prithviraj Kapoor in Milap
- Directed by: Abdul Rashid Kardar
- Produced by: Moti Mahal Pictures
- Starring: Prithviraj Kapoor; Bimla Kumari; Rampyari; M. Ismail
- Music by: K. C. Dey
- Production company: Moti Mahal Pictures
- Release date: 1937
- Country: India
- Language: Hindi-Urdu

Milap (transl. the union is a 1937 Indian social drama film directed by A. R. Kardar. Produced under the Moti Mahal Pictures banner, it had music composed by K. C. Dey. Milap was a big success for the actress Rampyari.

The film was famous for being the first to show the prototype of a "vamp" in Indian cinema. Rampyari was shown wearing "an off-shoulder dress" and using a cigarette-holder, with the intent of seducing the hero Prithviraj Kapoor. The scene was later used by Raj Kapoor on Nadira in his film Shree 420 (1955) for the song "Mud Mud Ke Na Dekh".

The co-stars included M. Ismail, Yakub, Bimla Kumari, Dev Bala and Anees Khatoon.

== Cast ==
- Prithviraj Kapoor
- Rampyari
- Indira Devi
- Mazhar Khan
- M. Ismail
- Yakub
- Bimla Kumari
- Anees Khatoon
- Devbala

== Soundtrack ==
Akbar Khan (Durrani) Peshawri sang the popular number "Pila Raha Hai Toh Kuchh Lutf-e-Mai Badha Ke Pila". The music director was K. C. Dey.

=== Song list ===
#	Title
1	"Chhoti Jaan Ke Na Chhod Jaiyo Baalma"
2	"Jamna Ka Kinara Ho Har Mauj Ke Hothon Par Afsana Hamara"
3	"Kahun Ri Sakhi Ik Maze Ki Baat"
4	"Koyaliya Madhur Bain Bole"
5	"Pila Raha Hai Toh Kuchh Lutf-e-Mai Badha Ke Pila"
6	"Sunoji Balam Ab Na Banegi Mori Tori"
7	"Dil Paraye Bas Mein Beet Gaya Din"
8	"Jagat Ka Rakhwala Hai Ram"
9	"Aa Prem Nagar Mein Aa Dil Ke Mandir"
