= Natir Puja =

1932 film

- Directed by: Rabindranath Tagore
- Written by: Rabindranath Tagore
- Produced by: B. N. Sircar
- Cinematography: Nitin Bose
- Edited by: Subodh Mitra
- Music by: Dinendranath Tagore
- Production company: New Theatres
- Release date: 22 March 1932 (Kolkata)
- Country: India
- Language: Bengali

Natir Puja (English:the dancing girl's worship) is the only film where Rabindranath Tagore is credited as director. This film is a recording of Tagore's 1926 stage dance-drama of the same name.

== Background ==
The dramatized version of Tagore's Natir Puja was first staged at Rabindranath's own home Uttorayan, Konarak Rabindrabhaban, Santinikatan in 1933. At the end of 1931, Tagore came to Kolkata (then Calcutta) from Santiniketan to perform a stage production of his 1926 dance drama. Here, B. N. Sircar, an Indian film producer and the founder of New Theatres Calcutta invited Tagore to transform the play into cinema under his New Theatres banner. Tagore gave consent to film their stage production.

== Filming ==
The film was shot on NT Studio's Floor Number 1, and it was shot within 4 days. Other than writing and directing the film, Tagore also acted in the film. The music of the film composed by Dinendranath Tagore. The cinematographer of the film was Subodh Mitra. They did not follow conventional rules, and the film was shot like a stage drama.

== Release and reception ==
After completion of shooting and editing, the 10,577-foot-long film version was released on 22 March 1932 at Chitra, Calcutta. Because of Tagore's presence in the film, it was expected that the film would be well received by viewers. The producers of the film agreed to donate fifty per cent of the film's proceeds into Tagore's Santiniketan project. But, the film was a commercial failure. Later, the staginess of the film was blamed for this commercial failure. B. N. Sircar felt the short shooting schedule of the film was the reason of the commercial failure.

However, some Bengali critics applauded the film for its "aesthetic values" (or Tagorean qualities). The Bengalee newspaper wrote in their review:

As everyone knows, apart from the charm lent to it by the Poet, the story has an intense appeal of its own. And considering the fact that the artistes were all amateurs in their teens, it may be said without hesitation that the charm has not suffered and the interest of the play has been maintained throughout. The songs, under the direction of Mr Dinendra Nath Tagore, have been well sung and are sure to be appreciated by all, especially the swan song of the dancing girl.
But the most striking feature of the film is the interpretative dance of the artiste who played the role of Srimati. To Rabindranath belongs the credit for revival of this ancient Indian art and its inclusion in this film must give an opportunity to many who have not seen it danced by the poet and his pupils during the seasonal festivals he is in the habit of celebrating in Calcutta to see and admire these dances.

== Aftermath ==
This is the only film where Rabindranath Tagore is credited as director. The prints of the film were destroyed in a fire at the New Theatres. Though recently, attempts have been made to restore those films.

== Credits ==
Title card of the dance-drama

- Writer, director: Rabindranath Tagore
- Producer: B. N. Sircar
- Music composer: Dinendranath Tagore
- Studio: New Theatres
- Cinematographer: Nitin Bose
- Cast: Students of Santiniketan
