= Abhagin =

- Directed by: Prafulla Roy
- Written by: Upendra Ganguly
- Produced by: New Theatres Ltd., Calcutta
- Starring: Molina Devi; Prithviraj Kapoor; Vijay Kumar; Bikram Kapoor
- Cinematography: Bimal Roy
- Music by: R. C. Boral
- Distributed by: Supreme Film Distributors, Bombay
- Release date: 1938
- Running time: 151 minutes
- Country: India
- Language: Hindi

Abhagin (Ill-Fated Woman) is a 1938 Hindi film directed by Prafulla Roy for New Theatres Ltd., Calcutta. A bilingual, it was made in Bengali language as Abhigyan. The film was based on a story by Upendranath Ganguly, with dialogue by A. H. Shore. R. C. Boral provided the music composition with lyrics for the Hindi version by Munshi Arzu (Arzu Lucknawi), and by Ajoy Bhattacharya for the Bengali. The screenplay was by Phani Majumdar for whom it was his first independent film as a scriptwriter. Bimal Roy, who was to make a name for himself as a prominent Bengali and Hindi director, was the cinematographer for the film. The cast included Molina Devi, Prithviraj Kapoor, Vijay Kumar, Nemo and Bikram Kapoor.

A wife rejected by her in-laws following her abduction is given shelter by the husband's friend. The story line follows the wife's ambivalent feelings for her saviour when she's accepted back into the family.

== Plot ==
Sandhya (Molina Devi), married to Priyalal (Vijay Kumar), lives with him at his father's (Nemo) residence. The father, Jawaharlal Choudhary, is an over-bearing and ruthless landlord. When he throws one of the tenants out for not paying the rent, the tenant violently attacks Choudhary, hurting his son who comes to his defense. The tenant then kidnaps Sandhya, but she manages to escape. She initially finds shelter with a relative (Bikram Kapoor) of hers. When she reaches home, her father-in-law refuses to let her stay as she's spent time away from home in company of a man. Though her husband sides with her, he's unwilling to confront his father. Sandhya is then given shelter by a friend of her husband, Promod (Prithviraj Kapoor). Promod helps Sandhya find her way in life. A bond is formed between the two. The in-laws are cleared of their misunderstanding and urge Sandhya to return home. Torn between her feelings for Promod and tradition, she chooses tradition and returns to her husband.

== Cast ==
=== Hindi ===
- Prithviraj Kapoor as Promod
- Molina Devi as Sandhya
- Vijay Kumar as Priyalal
- Nemo as Jawaharlal Chowdhary, Priyala’s father
- Bikram Kapoor as Prakash
- Devbala
- Menaka Devi as Nazma
- Pankaj Mullick
- Rajlakshmi
- Chaman Puri

=== Bengali ===
- Molina Devi as Sandhya
- Jiban Ganguly as Pramatha
- Sailen Pal as Priyalal
- Sailen Choudhury as Prakash
- Bhanu Bannerjee as Suresh
- Manoranjan Bhattacharya as Jawaharlal Chowdhary
- Devbala as Sabita
- Manorama as Manada Mashi
- Pankaj Mullick as Club member
- Menaka Devi as Nazma

== Review ==
Baburao Patel, editor of the cine-magazine Filmindia found the story "rather far-fetched", claiming that it "stretches the imagination unsympathetically". Photography by Bimal Roy was commended with the "outdoors ...more satisfactory than the indoor work". According to Patel, several scenes were undeveloped with a weak direction being responsible for it. The performance of Prithviraj Kapoor was commended "Once again Prithviraj is easily the best, because he gives a natural performance. Mollina also gives a sympathetic portrayal, but she has not been directed well". Vijay Kumar's performance as Priyalal was found to be weak and uninteresting.

The film did not do well at the box office as reported by Filmindia: "Abhagin did not fair (sic) well at the Minerva Talkies in Bombay. It is a pity that New Theatres should have given a weak picture for the box offices".

== Soundtrack ==
The music direction was by R. C. Boral and the singers were Molina Devi, Vijay Kumar, Kamla Jharia and Akbar Khan Peshawri.

=== Song list ===
#	Title	Singer
1	"Ik Nek Tabiyat Raja Tha"	Molina Devi
2	"Jal Bin Kaise Bujhegi Pyas"	Vijay Kumar
3	"Jigar Ke Ghav Ko Upar Ka Marham Kab Mitata Hai"	Kamla Jhari
4	"Kaam Se Kab Chhutkara"	
5	"Kab Tak Bhag Ka Rona Moorakh"	
6	"Kaun Hai Kis Ka Meet"	Akbar Khan Peshawri
7	"Nainan Ke Aansuon Se"	Molina Devi
8	"Sajan Bin Na Aave Dheer"	
9	"Tumse Maangne Mein Laaj Aaye"	Kamla Jharia
10	"Bhari Bahar Hai Saqi"	
11	"Hai Daata Kartaar Bhigade Bhaag Sanwaar"	
