= Sitaron Se Aagey (1958 film) =

- Directed by: Satyen Bose
- Written by: Satyen Bose
- Produced by: V. L. Narasu
- Starring: Ashok Kumar; Vyjayanthimala; Johnny Walker
- Cinematography: K. H. Kapadia
- Edited by: Bimal Roy
- Music by: S. D. Burman
- Production company: Narasu Studio
- Release date: 1958
- Running time: 149 minutes
- Country: India
- Language: Hindi

Sitaron Se Aagey (transl. Ahead of the Stars) is a 1958 Hindi Black-and-white family film written and directed by Satyen Bose. The film starred Ashok Kumar and Vyjayanthimala, with Johnny Walker, Rajasulochana, Shammi, Jagdish Sethi, Manmohan Krishna and Leela Mishra in supporting roles. The film was produced by V. L. Narasu. The film's score was composed by S. D. Burman with lyrics provided by Majrooh Sultanpuri. Editing was done by Bimal Roy and it was filmed by K. H. Kapadia.

== Cast ==
- Ashok Kumar as Rajesh
- Vyjayanthimala as Kanta
- Johnny Walker as Lattu
- Rajasulochana as Rajni
- Shammi as Lattu's Girlfriend
- Leela Mishra as Kanta's Aunty
- Jagdish Sethi as Shyamlal
- Manmohan Krishna as Shambhulal
- Iftekhar as Mohan

== Soundtrack ==
The film's soundtrack was composed by S. D. Burman with the lyrics penned by Majrooh Sultanpuri. The album had singer Geeta Dutt singing a Spanish song, where she lent her voice for actress Vyjayanthimala.

In 1958, the song "Zara Ruk Ja Pyare" was listed at number 11 on the Binaca Geetmala annual top songs.

Song	Singer
"Zara Ruk Ja Pyare"	Mohammed Rafi
"Sambhalke, Yeh Duniya Hai"	Mohammed Rafi
"Mehfil Mein Aaye Woh"	Lata Mangeshkar
"Pag Thumak Chalat"	Lata Mangeshkar
"Aa Khilte Hai Gul"	Lata Mangeshkar
"Dil Le Gaya, Gham De Gaya"	Geeta Dutt
"Roye Jiya, Aan Milo"	Asha Bhosle
"Chanda Ki Chandni"	Asha Bhosle
"Aaj Kal Parson"	Asha Bhosle
