= President (1937 film) =

- Directed by: Nitin Bose
- Produced by: New Theatres
- Starring: Kamlesh Kumari; K. L. Saigal; Leela Desai; Prithviraj Kapoor
- Cinematography: Nitin Bose
- Music by: R. C. Boral; Pankaj Mullick
- Production company: New Theatres
- Release date: 1937
- Running time: 152 minutes
- Country: India
- Language: Hindi

President is a 1937 Hindi social romantic drama film from New Theatres. The Bengali version was called Didi. The direction, screenplay and cinematography were by Nitin Bose. The film starred K. L. Saigal, Leela Desai, Kamlesh Kumari, Jagdish Sethi, Prithviraj Kapoor and Bikram Nahar. The story according to the credit roll of the film is "A tale of love and greater love" developed on an idea by M. M. Begg. It was a love triangle with a social content that highlighted the conditions of the mill workers. It was also the first film to show a liberated educated woman managing her own factory.

== Plot ==
Prabhavati's parents died when she was very young and the onus of looking after the Prabhavati Cotton Mills Ltd. has come to her. Her entire focus is on the factory and she is a strict and hardworking proprietor. Her only close companion is Dr. Sethi but even here there is a reserve. Prakash works at one of the machines in the mill. He finds that the machines they are working on are old and dangerous. He designs a safer and more efficient one and takes the design to the President of the company. She gets angry at his suggestion that the machines in her factory are dangerous and fires him. Prakash is out of a job and looking desperately for any form of income. He meets a young girl Sheila outside a girl's hostel with whom he gets friendly. The girl unknown to him is Prabhavati's younger sister.

The day Prakash is sacked from his work, the man who took his place at the machine has an accident. This gets Prabhavati thinking and she goes to Prakash's home to accept his design and re-instate him as head of the design unit. Over a period of time Prabhavati finds herself getting attracted to Prakash, without realising he's in love with her sister Sheila. During a conversation Sheila learns that Prabha loves Prakash. Sheila is devoted to her sister and feels deeply indebted to her for single-mindedly taking care of her and the factory. She leaves home and her attitude towards Prakash changes. Prakash unable to understand her behaviour takes out his frustration at work becoming despotic with the workers. The workers revolt and there is a showdown at the factory. Prabhavati rushes to the factory; she manages to find what is troubling Prakash. Appalled at the situation she locks herself in her office and works herself into a state where she collapses.

== Cast ==
- Kamlesh Kumari as Prabhavati, The President
- K. L. Saigal as Prakash
- Leela Desai as Sheila, The President's younger sister
- Prithviraj Kapoor as Dewan Prithviraj
- Jagdish Sethi as Dr. Sethi
- Bikram Nahar as Bikram, Dr. Sethi's brother
- Devbala as Debbala, Prakash's elder sister
- Shabir Ali as Gopal, Prakash's nephew
- Nawab as Dinubhai
- Vikram Kapoor as Kakababu, the secretary

== K. L. Saigal and songs ==
K. L. Saigal was regarded as the first super star of Indian Cinema with films like President (Didi in Bengali), Devdas and Street Singer leaving an impact on Hindi film music. President is cited as one of Saigal's finest films in which he sang one of his most memorable songs "Ek Bangla Bane Nyara". The lyrics of the song written by Kidar Sharma became an allegorical representation of the common man's dream of owning their own house.

=== Songs ===
#	Title	Singer(s)
1	"Rahegi Na Badariya"	K. L. Saigal
2	"Ek Raje Ka Udane Wala Ghoda"	K. L. Saigal
3	"Ek Bangla Bane Nyara"	K. L. Saigal
4	"Na Koi Prem Ka Rog"	K. L. Saigal
5	"Chandramukhi Ki Shaadi"	Chorus
6	"Prem Ka Hai Is Jag Mein"	K. L. Saigal
