= Umedram Lalbhai Desai =

Medical doctor (1869–1930)

(Rao Sahib) Umedram Lalbhai Desai (1869–1930) was a medical doctor in India during the time of the British Raj.

His medical qualifications included LRCP and LRCS (Edinburgh), LM and LFPS (Glasgow) 1894, MD (Brussels) 1895, MB Chb (University College, London and Owens College) 1895, MD (Victoria) 1900. He was the inventor of Screw Bone Perforator and instruments for Wiring Fractured Bones (Patented). (1904 British Medical Directory, Practitioners Resident Abroad)

== Early years ==
Desai was born in Vyara, Valod in Surat district in the Indian state of Gujarat, India on 16 November 1869. He belonged to the caste of Gujarati Brahmins called (Palwada) Audichya Sahastra Brahmin (Udichta), from the province of Surat. He was the only son of Lalbhai Desai and Ankar Bai. Lalbhai Desai was a landowner (Zamindar) who owned vast amounts of land in Valod.

At the age of 17, Desai married Diwali Bai. Their marriage was arranged by their parents at an early age. He had two sons, elder son was Balvantrai and younger is champaklalcaeser

== Gaikavad Scholar ==
In 1887/188 Desai attended the Grant Medical College in Bombay. He is listed as a "Gaikavad Scholar" in the University Calendar 1887–1888.

== Member of the Theosophical Society ==
In his early 20s Desai became a member of the Theosophical Society founded by Madame Blavatsky. He wrote many publications for the society. Among them were the following:

- Vedantic Philosophy (1890) (An Index to Oriental Department Papers - USA Section 1891–1897)
- Mysteries of the Himalayas (1890) (An Index to Oriental Department Papers - USA Section 1891–1897)
- Key to the Machinery of Man (1890) (An Index to Oriental Department Papers - USA Section 1891–1897)
- Helena Petrovna Blavatsky; Mabel Collins; Annie Wood Besant; George Robert Stow Mead (1890). Theosophical Review. Theosophical Publishing Society. by Theosophical Publishing Society, London, England (March - August 1890)
- Races in Western India (1891)

Desai is mentioned in the article "Why I Became A Theosophist" by Dr. Henry Travers Edge published in Theosophia: A Living Philosophy For Humanity in Volume XVI No. 4 (82) - Spring 1960.

"Among members of what might be called the household staff, I recall, besides the two Keightleys, the Countess Wachtmeister, whose name occupies a notable place in the pages of early Theosophical history; Mr. George R.S. Mead, H.P.B.'s secretary; Mr. Claude Falls Wright; Mrs. Cooper-Oakley and her sister Laura Cooper; Miss Kislingbury; Charles Johnston, Sanskrit scholar, who married Vera Zhelihovsky, H.P. Blavatsky's niece; Mr. Richard Harte, an American. Other notable names not included among resident members, are Herbert Burrows, leading Socialist; Dr. Franz Harman, well-known writer on occult subjects; Mrs. Alice Gordon, long resident in India and mentioned in early Theosophical annals; William Kingsland, then a young electrical engineer; Colonel Olcott. Among Hindus may be mentioned U.L. Desai and Rai Baroda K. Laheri."

In the supplement to the book The Theosophist written by Madame Blatvatsky in June 1891, Dr Umedram Lalbhai is mentioned.

""Meanwhile, the papers of the Oriental Department were begun in January by an article from the pen of Swami Bhaskara Nand Saraswati, a Hindu friend now here; in February the second was furnished by Dr. Umedram Lalbhai Desai, who is now in London"

There is also a reference to the Races in Western India in the article called The Path

== Education in Britain ==
Desai was sent to England by Sir Sayaji Rao III Gaekwad, Maharaja of Baroda, to pursue his education in Medicine. In 1892, at the age of 23, he entered Victoria University Owens College in Manchester, England.

In 1894, at the age of 25, Desai attained his Triple Qualification which was the "most thorough basic qualification a British doctor could have". He obtained the following diplomas:

- Licentiate of the Faculty of Physicians and Surgeons (LFPS) of Glasgow
- Licentiate of the Royal College of Physicians diploma (LRCP) of Edinburgh
- Licentiate of the Royal College of Surgeons (LRCS) of Edinburgh

In 1895 he completed his Bachelor of Medicine and Bachelor of Surgery (MB Chb) degrees from Owens College and University College London.

In the Medical Chronicle by Owens College Medical Department, at a Degree Ceremony held on Monday, 29 July 1895, Dr. Umedram Lalbhai Desai was presented for the Degree of Bachelor of Medicine and Bachelor of Surgery. (The Medical Chronicle: A Monthly Record of the Progress of Medical Science – Page 397)

== Chief Medical Officer in Bansda State, Gujarat ==
In 1898, while he was still an associate of Owens College Manchester, Dr Desai returned to India for a short period and became the Chief Medical Officer in the princely state of Bansda, southeast of Surat in the state of Gujarat.

During this year, he wrote an article called the Plague of India. This article was for distribution among members of the British Parliament and Government officials concerned in the welfare of India. The original copy of the article is currently archived at the British Library in London.

== Hospital Experience/Medical Theses in South Africa ==
As part of his 3-5-year hospital experience required for his medical degree, Dr. Desai worked at the Welsh Military Hospital in Springfontein, South Africa. He was one of eight medical students who accompanied Professor Thomas Jones from Owens College, Manchester. (Report by the CBRCC, 1902; British Medical Journal, p 250)

In 1900, Desai completed his medical thesis "Antivenene as an efficacious remedy against the venom of poisonous snakes M.D. Thesis" in Cape Colony, Queenstown, South Africa.

Anne Digby from Britain wrote an article in 2005 in which Desai is mentioned. Details of the article are provided below:

"To the South African born should also be added the occasional immigrant medic such as the West Indian, A. C. Jackson, or the Indian doctor, Umedram Laibhai Desai, and black doctors were also present in neighbouring territories, such as Basutoland, where Drs Sebeta and Motebang practised".

E. B. van Heyningen has also written an article on Desai.

“"Two black immigrant doctors completed the tally. Umedram Lalbhai Desai was an

Indian with the triple diploma from Edinburgh and Glasgow but, although he retained his name on the Cape register, he appears never to have lived in the colony." AGENTS OF EMPIRE: THE MEDICAL PROFESSION IN THE CAPE COLONY, 1880-1910 by E. B. van HEYNINGEN * Medical History, 1989, 33: 450-471.

== Surgeon-in-Charge of His Highness’s Armies and Imperial Service Troops in South Africa ==
During this time, he also became a member of the Royal Army Medical Corp (RAMC) and the "Surgeon-in-Charge of His Highness’s Armies and Imperial Service Troops." On 8 April 1919, Umedram Lalbhai Desai relinquished his temporary rank as a captain in the Indian Medical Service. "The KING has approved the relinquishment of temp, rank in the Indian Medical Service by the following gentlemen: - Captain Umedram Lalbhai Desai, 8th April, 1919" The London Gazette, 31 October 1991

== Ex Officio in the Indian National Congress Party ==
Desai is mentioned in the Encyclopaedia of Political Parties as an Ex Officio member for Burmah in the Indian National Congress party created in 1885.

== Medical Practice in Fort Area and Mazagoan, Bombay ==
Desai returned to India as a doctor in 1901. His title was Mb B.Ch. Vict. Eng, M.D. Belge, LRCP, LRCS; L.M. Edinburgh, M.C.P.A.C.P. (London). Desai did not live long in Vyara with Diwali Bai. He left her and moved to Sagar Palace, Walkeshwar, Bombay to practice medicine. In Bombay he practiced medicine in the Fort area. His institution cum dispensary: 'Medico-Electric' was in the Fort area with a branch in Mazagaon near Byculla. He used to commute from his residence at Walkeshwar. See the article below for details of Medico-Electric equipment.

At the age of 36, he married Satyabala Devi (born 1892) – daughter of a Zamindar from Bihar and a child widow. She was only 13 years old. She was a fine veena and violin player and had learnt music since her childhood. She had also learned several languages, including English.

== Experiment With Music Therapy ==
In 1906 after the death of his father, Desai inherited a lot of property in Valod near Surat. He and his wife Satyabala Devi moved to Surat and settled there. He set up practice there and also opened a dispensary for the poor. He also started to experiment with music therapy as a treatment for his mental patients.

"Along with medical treatment, he began to experiment with the 'Music Therapy' with the help of his musician wife. Soon the news spread around and sent an invitation to the couple for the treatment. Reva Naresh was impressed with this novel therapy and he decided to send Dr. and Mrs. Desai to America. He sponsored the tour and also arranged for the recordings of Veena recitals. Satyabala Devi‘s veena recitals were wonderful and effective. ...Dr. Desai and Satyabala Devi stayed in America for three years [1910-13] and presented lecture/demonstrations."

== State Surgeon and Personal Physician ==
After he returned to India from the United States, Dr Desai became the State Surgeon for the states of Rampur, Rohilkund, Uttar Pradesh, Agra and Oudh. He was also the personal physician to His Highness the Nawab of Rampur, in Uttar Pradesh.

Desai lived in the Palace grounds with Satyabala Devi, his wife, and his five children. He hired a tutor, Guno Bati Mitter, to educate his children. Guno Bati's brother Ridhoyranjan Mitter, the sub-editor of the Statesman newspaper in Calcutta, arranged for Gunobati to work as a tutor in the Desai household. The circumstances of the marriage are not known except that Desai left Satyabala Devi to marry Gunobati. He was 45 and she was 27 years old. They got married at the Registry Office in Rampur. Gunobati was an educated Christian lady with very high moral values. She was very educated for a woman of her time. She had completed her Intermediate Arts (IA) from the Diocesan School in Calcutta, India.

Desai and Gunobati moved to Dehradun.

== Chief Medical Officer/Sanitary Commissioner/Jail Superintendent ==
He was appointed Chief Medical Officer, Sanitary Commissioner and Jail Superintendent of Sachin State in 1919. He lived in the grounds of the East India Company factory in Surat.

== Mental, Nervous, and Epilepsy Specialist in Umrath ==
In 1924, Desai moved from Surat to Umrath where the Maharaja of Baroda had several houses by the sea. He ran a mental asylum called the Sea-Side Home for Mental and Nervous cases. His title was Mental, Nervous, and Epilepsy Specialist. Umrath was a very isolated place on the Arabian sea.

While he was in Umrath, Desai had a room at the Taj Hotel in Bombay where he visited his patients once a month.

The Taj Mahal hotel was built in 1903 by Mr. Tata who wanted a hotel for the upper-class Indians. "From Maharajas and Princes to various kings, Presidents, CEOs and entertainers, the Taj played the perfect host, supportive of their needs".

== Medical Practice in Colaba, Bombay ==
In 1928, Desai and his family moved to Bombay, where they lived in Grants Building, Arthur Bunder Road, Colaba, Mumbai. The family lived in the back of the dispensary which was located in Navy Nagar across from the Afghan church.

== Final Days ==
In August 1930, Desai was hospitalized for about a month at the King Edward Memorial (K.E.M.) hospital in Acharya Donde Marg, Parel, Bombay. He had a carbuncle on his back. Dr. Jivraj Mehta was his attending doctor and he operated on Desai's carbuncle 4 times.

Desai died at home on Thursday, 30 September 1930 at 2:00 p.m. at the age of 59. He left behind the following family members:

- His first wife Diwali Bai and 2 sons - Ganda Bhai and Champak Lal
- His second wife Satyabala Devi and 5 children - Daulatrai, Shanti, Suprakash, Leela, and Monica
- His third wife Gunobati and 6 children - Kamala, Ramola, Victor, Dolly, Sarla (Noni) and Rajender (George)

His daughter Leela Desai became the famous Indian actress of the 1940s and 50s, Shanti married the nephew of Sir Rabindranath Tagore, Monica married Phani Majumdar and Ramola married the grandson of Nawab Sirajul Islam. Also, check out the website for Ramola Islam

Desai's great-grandson Dr. Dhiren Desai from his first wife diwalibaa family lives in bardoli at baben avadh lifestyle near bardoli Gujarat
