= Waris (1954 film) =

- Directed by: Nitin Bose
- Starring: Suraiya; Nadira; Talat Mahmood
- Music by: Anil Biswas
- Release date: 1954
- Country: India
- Language: Hindi

Waris is a 1954 Indian Hindi-language film directed by Nitin Bose. The film was produced under Sohrab Modi's company Minerva Movietone, and featured a soundtrack composed by Anil Biswas. The leading cast included Suraiya, Nadira, and Talat Mahmood.

Premiered in Bombay on 6 August 1954, Waris was described in a Times of India review as a "powerful poignant romantic drama". The newspaper also reported on the film's commercial success.

== Cast ==
- Suraiya
- Nadira
- Talat Mahmood
- Jagdish Sethi
- Sadat Ali
- Mehelli Modi
- Roopmala
- Yakub
- Achala Sachdev
