= Pankaj Mullick =

Indian music composer and singer (1905–1978)

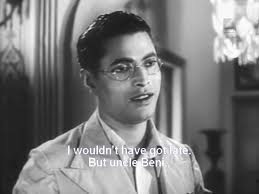
- Mullick in the film Doctor, 1940
- Born: 10 May 1905; Calcutta, Bengal Presidency, British India
- Died: 19 February 1978 (aged 72); Calcutta, West Bengal, India
- Occupations: musical composer, singer and actor
- Known for: singing, music direction, composition and acting

Pankaj Kumar Mullick (10 May 1905 – 19 February 1978) was an Indian music composer, playback singer and actor, who was a pioneer of film music in Bengali cinema and Hindi cinema at the advent of playback singing, as well as an early exponent of Rabindra Sangeet.

== Awards and recognition ==
Pankaj Mullick was awarded the Padma Shri award in 1970, followed by the Dadasaheb Phalke Award (India's highest award in cinema, given by the Government of India) in 1972 for lifetime contribution to Indian cinema.

== Early life and training ==
Pankaj Kumar Mullick was born on 10 May 1905 in Kolkata to Monimohan and Monomohini Mullick. His father Monimohan had a deep interest in traditional Bengali music. He developed an early interest in music, and used to practice on his neighbour's harmonium in secret. He started his early training in Indian classical music under the tutelage of Durgadas Bandyopadhyaya. Pankaj studied at the Scottish Church College of the University of Calcutta.

An important turning point in his life came when, after finishing his studies, he came in contact with Dinendranath Tagore, who was Rabindranath Tagore's grand-nephew. This led to Pankaj Mullick's lasting interest in Rabindra Sangeet. Rabindranath Tagore, in turn, grew fond of him, and soon Mullick became known as one of the leading exponents of Tagore's songs.

== Career ==
Pankaj Mullick became a popular musician in the 1930s and 1940s in the era of singer K. L. Saigal. Tagore's song Nemecche Aaj Prothom Badal became his first commercial recording, with the Kolkata-based Videophone Company in 1926, at the age of twenty one. This was the first of many albums which made him a household name in Rabindra sangeet.

He started his career with the Indian Broadcasting Corporation in Calcutta in 1927, the forerunner of All India Radio (AIR), along with composer R. C. Boral, where he contributed as a music director and artist for nearly fifty years. Apart from composing songs for movies, he also composed the programme called Mahishashur Mardini. This program was based on the triumph Maa Durga over the demon Mahishashur. The programme included Chandi Path by Birendra Krishna Bhadra and Agomoni songs by various singers. This programme gained such a huge popularity that till date, the recorded version of this programme is played by All India Radio on the day of Mahalaya at 4:00 am.

He contributed in various capacities to Bengali, Hindi, Urdu and Tamil language films for 38 years, starting in 1931. He worked as music director to artists like K.L. Saigal, S.D. Burman, Hemanta Mukherjee, Geeta Dutt and Asha Bhosle. He acted with famous film actors like K L Saigal, P.C. Barua and Kanan Devi. Along with Nitin Bose and his renowned sound engineer brother Mukul Bose, Mullick introduced playback singing in Indian cinema. He also composed his own tunes and set lyrics to music.

He worked with one of the early film studios, New Theatres Calcutta for 25 years. He became one of its two ace music directors.

== Death and legacy ==
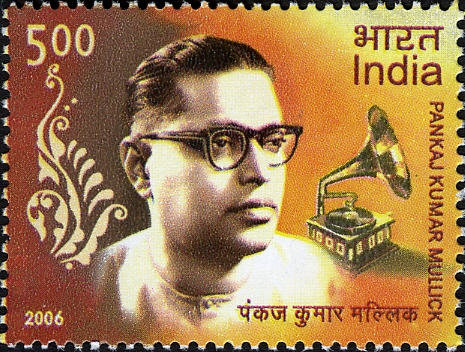
Mullick on a 2006 stamp of India

Pankaj Mullick died on 19 February 1978 in Calcutta, India. The Indian Postal Service released a postage stamp on his birth centenary in 2006 on 4 August, and on 10 May, Doordarshan, India's state television channel, telecast a special music programme to commemorate the occasion. Five decades earlier, it was he and Bharatanatyam dancer Vyjayanthimala who were lead performers at the nationwide launch of the channel in 1959.

== Filmography ==
Year	Film
1955	Raikamal
1954	Chitrangada
1952	Yatrik
1952	Mahaprasthaner Pathey
1952	Zalzala
1950	Rupkatha
1949	Manzoor
1948	Pratibad
1947	Ramer Sumati
1945	Dui Purush
1944	Meri Bahen
1943	Kashinath
1943	Dikshul
1942	Meenakshi
1940	Doctor
1940	Nartaki
1940	Zindagi
1939	Badi Didi
1939	Dushman
1939	Kapal Kundala
1938	Abhagin
1938	Abhigyan
1938	Desher Mati
1938	Dharti Mata
1938	Jiban Maran
1937	Badi Bahen
1937	Didi
1937	Mukti
1936	Devdas
1936	Grihadah
1936	Karodpati a.k.a. Millionaire with R. C. Boral
1936	Maya
1936	Manzil
1933	Yahudi Ki Ladki (His debut with the Hindi Film Industry)
1931	Chasher Meye

== Works ==
- Aamar Jug Aamar Gaan (Bengali). Firma KLM Pvt Ltd., Calcutta 1980.

== See also ==
- Indian film music directors
