= Prithviraj Kapoor =

Indian actor (1906–1972)

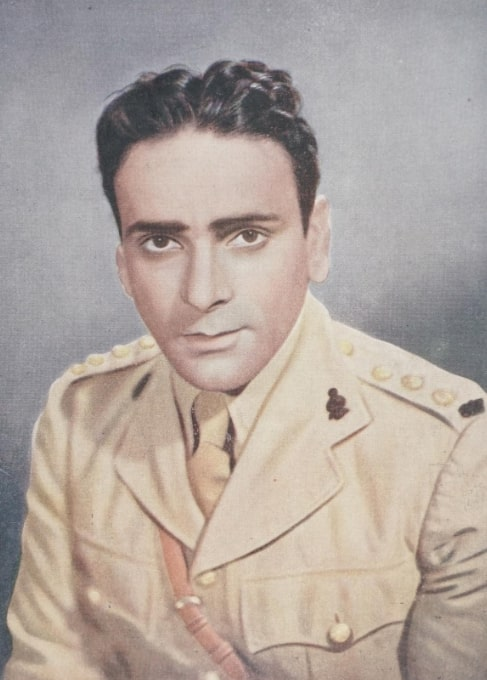
- Kapoor in the film Ek Raat (1942)
- Born: Prithvinath Kapoor; November 3, 1906; Samundri, Punjab, British India
- Died: 29 May 1972 (aged 65); Mumbai, Maharashtra, India
- Education: Lyallpur Khalsa College, Lyallpur; Edwardes College Peshawar (BA)
- Occupation: Actor
- Years active: 1927–1972
- Spouse: Ramsarni Mehra (m. 1923)
- Children: 6, including Raj, Shammi and Shashi
- Relatives: see Kapoor family
- Honours: Padma Bhushan (1969); Dadasaheb Phalke Award (1971)

Member of Parliament, Rajya Sabha
- In office 3 April 1952 – 2 April 1960
- Preceded by: office established
- Succeeded by: Tarasankar Bandyopadhyay
- Constituency: Nominated (Arts)

Prithviraj Kapoor (born Prithvinath Kapoor; 3 November 1906 – 29 May 1972) was an Indian actor who is also considered to be one of the founding figures of Hindi cinema. He was associated with IPTA as one of its founding members and established the Prithvi Theatres in 1944 as a travelling theatre company based in Mumbai.

He was the patriarch of the Kapoor family of Hindi films, four generations of which, beginning with him, have played active roles in the Hindi film industry, with the youngest generation still active in Bollywood. His father, Basheshwarnath Kapoor, also played a short role in his movie Awara. The Government of India honoured him with the Padma Bhushan in 1969 and the Dadasaheb Phalke Award in 1971 for his contributions towards Indian cinema.

== Early life and education ==
Prithviraj Kapoor was born as Prithvinath Kapoor on 3 November 1906 in Samundri, British India, into a Punjabi Hindu Khatri family. His father, Dewan Basheshwarnath Kapoor, was a police officer in the Indian Imperial Police. His grandfather, Dewan Keshavmal Kapoor, and his great-grandfather, Dewan Murli Mal Kapoor, were Tehsildars in Samundri near Lyallpur. Kapoor was the eldest of eight siblings; five boys (including actor Trilok Kapoor) and three girls. His cousin was film producer Surinder Kapoor, the father of Anil Kapoor, Boney Kapoor and Sanjay Kapoor.

Kapoor's childhood was largely spent in Lyallpur District, where his grandparents and extended family lived. A few years later the family shifted to Peshawar but retained their holdings in Lyallpur. Kapoor studied initially at Lyallpur Khalsa College, and later at Edwardes College in Peshawar, where he received his Bachelor of Arts. He also went on to study law for a year before deciding to become an actor.

== Career ==
Kapoor began his acting career in the theatres of Lyallpur and Peshawar. In 1928, he moved to Mumbai, with a loan from an aunt. There he joined the Imperial Films Company and started acting in minor roles in movies. In 1929, he made his acting debut as an extra in his first film, Be Dhari Talwar. He went on to earn a lead role in his third film, titled Cinema Girl, which released in 1930.

After featuring in nine silent films, including Be Dhari Talwar, Cinema Girl, Sher-e-Arab and Prince Vijaykumar, Kapoor did a supporting role in India's first film talkie, Alam Ara (1931). His performance in Vidyapati (1937) was much appreciated. His best-known performance is perhaps as Alexander the Great in Sohrab Modi's Sikandar (1941). He also joined the Grant Anderson Theater Company, an English theatrical company that remained in Mumbai for a year. Through all these years, Kapoor remained devoted to the theatre and performed on stage regularly. He developed a reputation as a very fine and versatile actor on both stage and screen.

=== Prithvi Theatres ===
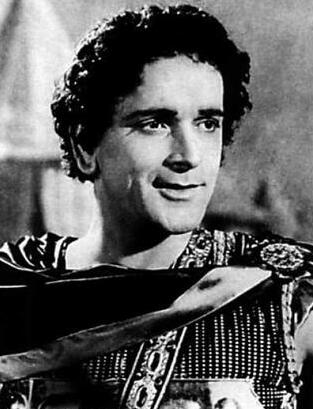
Kapoor in Sikandar (1941)

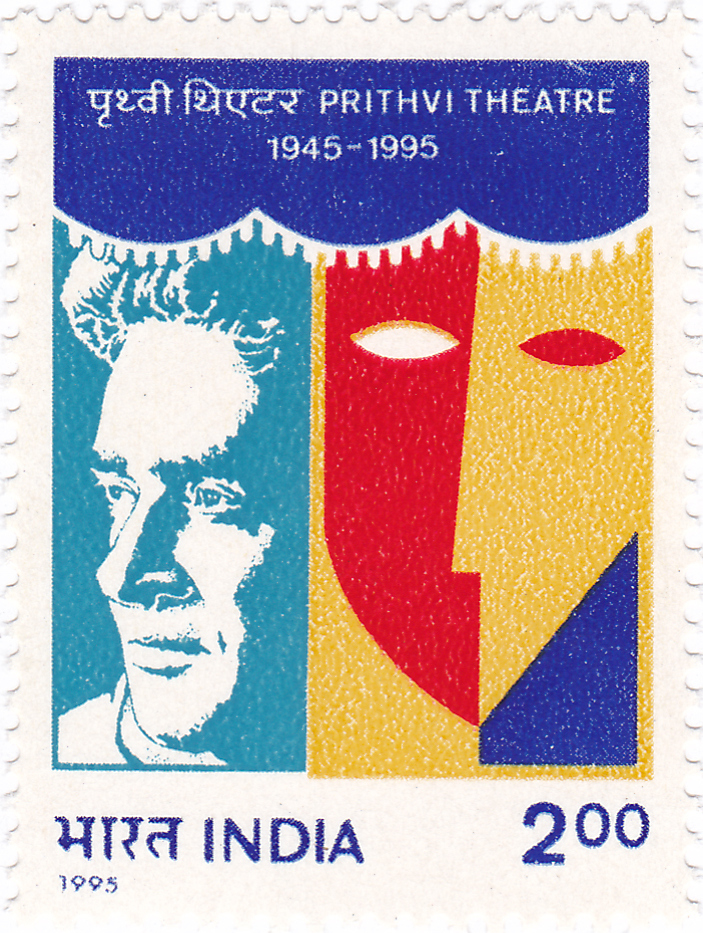
A 1995 Indian stamp dedicated to Prithvi Theatres and Prithviraj Kapoor

By 1944, Kapoor had the wherewithal and standing to found his own theatre group, Prithvi Theatres, whose première performance was Kalidasa's Abhijñānaśākuntalam in 1942. His eldest son, Raj Kapoor, by 1946, had struck out on his own; the films he produced had been successful and this was also an enabling factor. Prithviraj invested in Prithvi Theatres, which staged memorable productions across India. The plays were highly influential and inspired young people to participate in the Indian independence movement and the Quit India Movement. In over 16 years of existence, the theatre staged some 2,662 performances. Prithviraj starred as the lead actor in every single show. One of his popular plays was called Pathan (1947), which was performed on stage nearly 600 times in Mumbai. It opened on 13 April 1947, and is a story of a Muslim and his Hindu friend.

By the late 1950s, it was clear that the era of the travelling theatre had been irreversibly supplanted by the cinema and it was no longer financially feasible for a troupe of up to 80 people to travel the country for four to six months at a time along with their props and equipment and living in hotels and campsites. The financial returns, through ticket sales and the rapidly diminishing largesse of patrons from the erstwhile princely class of India, was not enough to support such an effort. Many of the fine actors and technicians that Prithvi Theatres nurtured had found their way to the movies. Indeed, this was the case with all of Prithviraj's own sons. As Kapoor progressed into his 50s, he gradually ceased theatre activities and accepted occasional offers from film-makers, including his own sons. He appeared with his son Raj in the 1951 film Awara as a stern judge who had thrown his own wife out of his house. Later, under his son, Shashi Kapoor, and daughter-in-law Jennifer Kendal, Prithvi Theatre merged with the Indian Shakespeare theatre company, "Shakespeareana", and the company got a permanent home, with the inauguration of the Prithvi Theatre in Mumbai on 5 November 1978.

==== Postage stamp ====
Prithviraj Kapoor
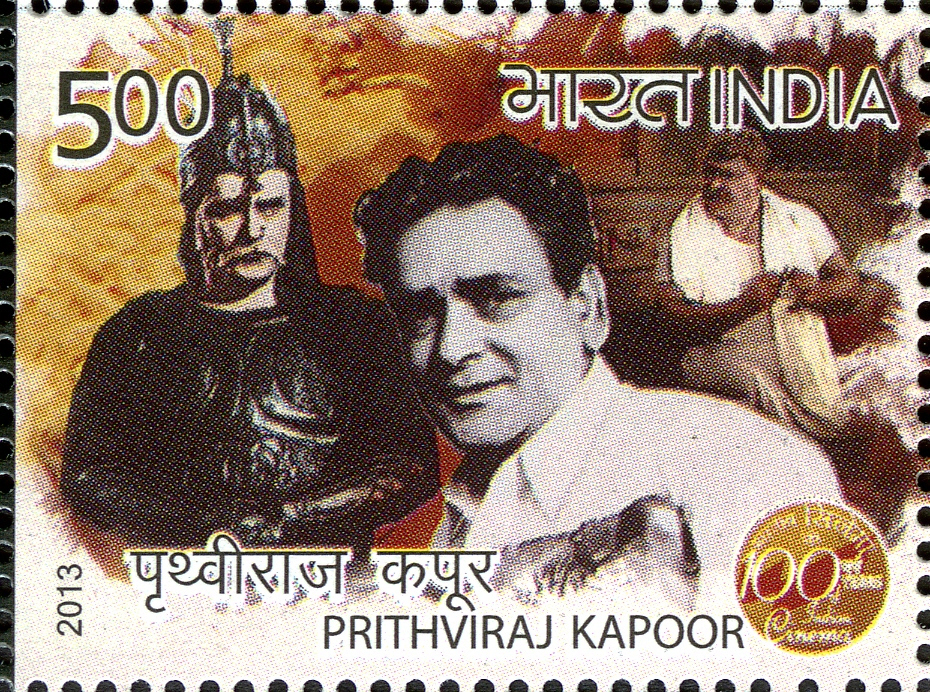
- Type: Commemorative Stamps
- Country of issue: India
- Date of issue: 03/05/2013
- Commemorates: celebrating 100 Years of Indian Cinema
- Face value: INR 5.00

In 1996, the Golden Jubilee year of the founding of Prithvi Theatre, India Post, issued a special two Rupee commemorative postage stamp. It featured the logo of the theatre, the dates 1945–1995, and an image of Kapoor. The first day cover, (stamped 15-1-95), showed an illustration of a performance of a travelling theatre in progress, on a stage that seems fit for a travelling theatre, as Prithvi theatre was for sixteen years, until 1960. On the occasion of 100 years of the Indian cinema, another postage stamp, bearing his likeness, was released by India Post on 3 May 2013.

=== Later years ===
His filmography of this period includes Mughal-e-Azam (1960), where he gave his most memorable performance as the Mughal emperor Akbar, which earned him a nomination for the Filmfare Award for Best Supporting Actor, Harishchandra Taramati (1963) in which he played the lead role, an unforgettable performance as Porus in Sikandar-e-Azam (1965), and the stentorian grandfather in Kal Aaj Aur Kal (1971), in which he appeared with his son Raj Kapoor and grandson Randhir Kapoor.

Kapoor starred in the legendary religious Punjabi film Nanak Nam Jahaz Hai (1969), a film so revered in Punjab that there were lines many kilometres long to purchase tickets.

He also starred in the Punjabi films Nanak Dukhiya Sub Sansar (1970) and Mele Mittran De (1972).

He also acted in the Kannada film Sakshatkara (1971), directed by Kannada director Puttanna Kanagal. He acted as Dr. Rajkumar's father in the film.

== Awards and honours ==
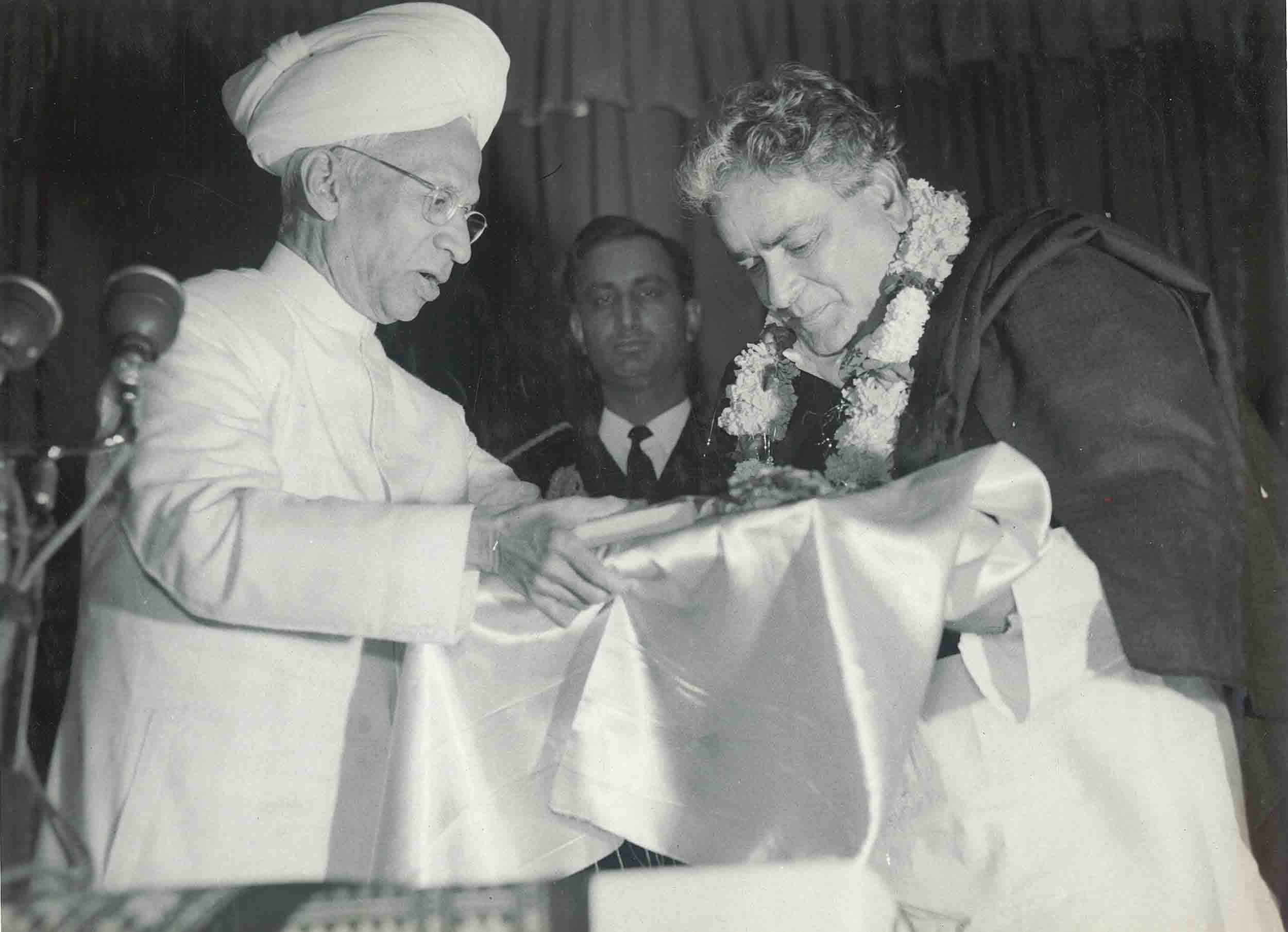
The President Dr. Radhakrishnan presenting Abhinandan Granth to Shri Prithivaj Kapoor

In 1954, he was awarded the Sangeet Natak Akademi Fellowship, and in 1969, the Padma Bhushan by the Government of India. He remained Nominated Rajya Sabha Member for eight years.

He was posthumously awarded the Dadasaheb Phalke Award for the year 1971. He was the third recipient of that award, the highest accolade in Indian cinema.

He was also inducted into the Bollywood Walk of Fame at Bandra Bandstand, where his autograph was preserved.

=== Awards ===
- 1954: Sangeet Natak Akademi Fellowship by the Sangeet Natak Akademi
- 1956: Sangeet Natak Akademi Award by the Sangeet Natak Akademi
- 1961: Nominated – Filmfare Award for Best Supporting Actor – Mughal-e-Azam
- 1969: Padma Bhushan by the Government of India
- 1972: Dadasaheb Phalke Award (Posthumous) for the year 1971, for his immense contribution to Indian theatre and cinema
- 1972: Filmfare Special Award (Special Commendation)

== Personal life ==
Kapoor was 17 when he was married to 15-year-old Ramsarni Mehra, who was from the same community, in an arranged marriage. The marriage was harmonious and conventional, and they remained married with each other till death. Some believe the marriage had actually been held earlier with the farewell ceremony only being held when Ramsarni was 15 years old. Ramsarni's brother, Jugal Kishore Mehra, would later enter the film industry.

The couple's eldest child, Raj Kapoor, was born the following year in Peshawar, North West Frontier Province, on 14 December 1924; making Prithviraj a father at the age of 18. By the time Prithviraj moved to Mumbai in 1927, he had fathered two more children with her. In 1930, Ramsarni joined Prithviraj in Mumbai. The following year, while she was pregnant for the fourth time, two of their sons died. Son Devinder died of pneumonia, while son Ravinder swallowed rat poison while playing in the garden.

The couple went on to have three more children: sons Shamsher Raj (Shammi) and Balbir Raj (Shashi) and daughter Urmila Sial.

After his retirement, Prithviraj took a lease of a cottage called Prithvi Jhonpra near Juhu Beach, West Mumbai. The property would later be bought by Shashi Kapoor, and later converted into a small theatre. Both Prithviraj and Ramsarni would be diagnosed of cancer, with them dying 16 days apart. Prithviraj died on 29 May 1972 and Ramsarni died on 14 June 1972.

A Samadhi (memorial) of Raj Kapoor at their 125 acre family farm "Rajbaugh", also houses Privthiraj Kapoor and his wife's memorial. Rajbaugh lies on the banks of Mula-Mutha River in Loni Kalbhor, 30 km east of Pune. The Kapoor family sold a part of the farm to MIT World Peace University (MIT WPU) which houses a memorial for the Kapoor family on its campus. He shared a deep friendship with celebrated Hindi poet Harivansh Rai Bachchan, the father of Amitabh Bachchan.

== Selected filmography ==
- Be Dhari Talwar (1929)
- Cinema Girl (1930)
- Sher-e-Arab (1930)
- Prince Vijaykumar (1930)
- Alam Ara (1931)
- Draupadi (1931) - Arjuna
- Golibar (1931)
- Toofan (1931)
- Blood Feuds (1931)
- Namak Haram Kon (1931)
- Dagabaz, Ashiq (1932)
- Rajrani Meera (1933) - Rana Kumbh, King of Chitor
- Ramayan (1933)
- Seeta (1934) - Ram
- Daku Mansoor (1934)
- Inquilab (1935)
- Manzil (1936) - Suresh
- Vidyapati (1937) - King Shiva Singha
- Anath Ashram (1937) - Ranjit
- Milap (1937)
- President (1937) - Dewan Prithviraj
- Abhagin (1938) - Promode
- Dharti Mata (1938)
- Dushman (1938)
- Adhuri Kahani (1939) - Somnath
- Sapera (1939)
- Pagal (1940) - Dr. Vasant
- Sajani (1940) - Nanda
- Dipak Mahal (1940)
- Deepak (1940)
- Chingari (1940)
- Aaj Ka Hindustan (1940)
- Raj Nartaki (1941) - Prince Chandrakriti (Hindi version)
- Sikandar (1941) - Alexander the Great
- Ujala (1942)
- Chauranghee (1942)
- Ek Raat (1942)
- Gauri (1943)
- Aankh Ki Sharm (1943)
- Ishara (1943)
- Bhalai (1943)
- Vish Kanya (1943)
- Maharathi Karna (1944) - Karna
- Phool (1945)
- Vikramaditya (1945) - Vikramaditya
- Devdasi (1945)
- Shri Krishn Arjun Yuddha (1945)
- Valmiki (1946)
- Prithviraj Samyogita (1946)
- Azadi Ki Raah Par (1948)
- Dahej (1950) - Thakur (Chanda's dad)
- Hindustan Hamara (1950) - Himself
- Awaara (1951) - Justice Raghunath
- Anand Math (1952) - Satyananda
- Insaan (1952)
- Aag Ka Dariya (1953)
- Chhatrapati Shivaji (1952)
- Ehsan (1954)
- Pardesi (1957) - Mehmud Gawan
- Paisa (1957)
- Lajwanti (1958)
- Jagga Daku (1959)
- Mughal-e-Azam (1960) - Emperor Akbar
- Senapati (1961) - Senapati
- Pyaar Kiya To Darna Kya (1963) - Kunwar Saheb
- Harishchandra Taramati (1963) - King Harishchandra
- Rajkumar (1964) - Maharaja
- Zindagi (1964) - Rai Bahadur Gangasaran
- Jahan Ara (1964) - Shah Jahan
- Gazal (1964) - Nawab Bakar Ali Khan
- Janwar (1965) - Mr. Srivastava
- Aasmaan Mahal (1965) - Asmaan
- Khakaan (1965)
- Sikandar-e-Azam (1965) - Porus
- Lootera (1965) - Shah Zaman
- Jahan Sati Wahan Bhagwan (1965) - Maharaja Karamdham
- Shri Ram Bharat Milap (1965) - Raja Dashrath
- Shankar Khan (1966) - Safdar Khan
- Sher E Afghan (1966)
- Yeh Raat Phir Na Aaygi (1966) - Professor
- Daku Mangal Singh (1966)
- Lal Bungla (1966) - Police Sub-Inspector then S.P.
- Love And Murder (1966) - Inspector
- Insaaf (1966) - Judge
- Shamsheer (1967)
- Rustom Sohrab (1967) - Rustom Zabuli
- Shamsher (1967)
- Teen Bahuraniyan (1968) - Dinanath
- Balram Shri Krishna (1968)
- Bambai Raat Ki Bahon Mein (1968) - Himself
- Nai Zindagi (1969)
- Nanak Naam Jahaz Hai (1969, Punjabi movie) - Gurmukh Singh
- Insaf Ka Mandir (1969) - Judge
- Bombay by Nite (1969) - Lalaji
- Sati Sulochana (1969) - Param Shivbhakt Lankeshwar Ravan
- Nanak Dukhiya Sub Sansar (1970, Punjabi movie) - Giani
- Heer Raanjha (1970) - The King
- Ek Nannhi Munni Ladki Thi (1970)
- Gunah Aur Kanoon (1970) - Jamnadas
- Sher E Watan (1971) - Baadshah Hanibaal
- Padosi (1971)
- Kal Aaj Aur Kal (1971) - Diwan Bahadur Kapoor
- Sakshatkara (1971, Kannada) - Bhoopalayya
- Baankelal (1972)
- Naag Panchami (1972) - Maharaj Chandradhar
- Mele Mitran De (1972, Punjabi movie)
- Naya Nasha (1973) - Rana
