= Bhagya Chakra =

- Directed by: Nitin Bose
- Screenplay by: Nitin Bose
- Story by: Sudarshan
- Starring: Biswanath Bhaduri; Durgadas Bannerjee; Krishnachandra Dey; Pahari Sanyal
- Music by: Rai Chand Boral
- Release date: 1935
- Running time: 125 minutes
- Country: India
- Language: Bengali

Bhagya Chakra (Wheel of Fate) is a 1935 Indian Bengali-language film directed by Nitin Bose. The film was remade in Hindi in the same year, titled Dhoop Chhaon.

== Cast ==
- Biswanath Bhadhuri as Shamlal
- Haricharan Bandyopadhyay as Hiralal
- K.C.Dey as Surdas
- Nivanani Debi as Paanchir Ma
- Amar Mullick as Theatre Manager
- Keshto Das as Assistant Manager
- Pahari Sanyal as Dipak
- Durgadas Bannerjee as Mr.Ray
- Umasashi as Mira
- Debabala as Mira's mother
- Indu Mukherjee as Detective
- Shyam Law as Detective
- Pramathesh Barua as guest at party
- Vikram Nahar as guest#2
- Nagendrabala as Nurse
- Sailen Pal as 'Stage'- Dipak
- Ahi Sanyal as bad singer
