= Kashinath (1943 film) =

- Directed by: Nitin Bose
- Story by: Sarat Chandra Chattopadhyay
- Starring: Asit Baran; Sunanda Devi
- Release date: 1943
- Country: India
- Language: Hindi

Kashinath is a 1943 Bollywood drama film, directed by Nitin Bose. It stars Bharati Devi, Sunanda Devi, Manorama, Asit Baren, Bijlee, Latika Malik, Nemo, Budhdev and more.

== Cast ==
- Asit Baran (Kashinath)
- Sunanda Devi (Kamala)
- Bharati Devi (Bindu)
- Nemo (Manager)
- Nawab (Pitambar Chakravarty)
- Dilip Bose (Binode)
