= Dushman (1939 film) =

- Directed by: Nitin Bose
- Written by: Nitin Bose
- Produced by: New Theatres
- Starring: K. L. Saigal; Leela Desai; Najmul Hassan; Prithviraj Kapoor
- Cinematography: Nitin Bose
- Edited by: Subodh Mitter
- Music by: Pankaj Mullick
- Production company: New Theatres
- Release date: 1939
- Running time: 144 min
- Country: India
- Language: Hindi

Dushman is a 1939 Hindi social romantic drama film. It was directed by Nitin Bose for New Theatres Calcutta Production. The film starred K. L. Saigal, Leela Desai, Najmul Hassan, Prithviraj Kapoor, Nemo and Jagdish Sethi. The music was composed by Pankaj Mullick and the lyrics were written by Arzu Lucknavi. Nitin Bose besides directing also wrote the story and wielded the camera for the film. The dialogue writer was Sudarshan. The story subject about tuberculosis was suggested as a propaganda film by Viceroy Lord Linlithgow and his wife, who were then the Chairman and Patron of King George’s Tuberculosis Fund.

The film is about two friends who want to marry the same girl unknowingly till one of them discovers he has tuberculosis. He decides to sacrifice his love but ends up in a sanatorium where he is treated.

== Story ==
Mohan (K. L. Saigal) and Gita (Leela Desai) are friends and discover they are in love. Gita visits Mohan at his house regularly and they also rendezvous at night by the lakeside where they listen to a tramp on his violin. Mohan is making plans on increasing his allowance while Gita is worried about his health. Mohan works at a radio station as a singer. His boss (Jagdish Sethi) at the radio station is rough and kind in turn. Mohan’s friend Dr. Kedar (Najmul Hassan) is also worried about his health and repeatedly suggests Mohan take a rest from work and the city for at least a year. He advises Mohan not to think of getting married till that time. Gita’s mother (Devbala) and Aunt (Manorama Sr.) have found a suitable boy Dr. Kedar, for Gita without her knowledge. They invite him for tea where he brings Mohan with him. Mohan realises the set-up and leaves the house asking Gita to meet him at their usual place. He tells Gita that it’s time for them to stop meeting and wait for some time. Gita is upset and refuses to let him complete his conversation.

Mohan starts developing daily evening fevers and he tells Dr. Kedar over the phone, Kedar insists on taking care of him but Mohan refuses. Dr. Kedar visits Gita as they have planned to see a film together. However, Gita takes him to the rendezvous place where they are seen by Mohan. A distraught Mohan rushes from there not caring whether he lives or dies. He meets a doctor who is an assistant (Bikram Kapoor) at a sanatorium run by an old doctor (Prithviraj Kapoor). The doctor forces Mohan to come with him to the sanatorium. At the sanatorium after initial hesitation Mohan becomes interested in the working and finances of the hospital. The Chief says that they can’t forcibly treat TB patients but maybe in the near future it may be rendered compulsory and then maybe they can get help. But first they have to make the people aware of the problem. A radio station comes to their help to set up a connection from the sanatorium.

Since Mohan was in the first stages of TB he starts improving and sings on the radio to make an appeal. The song is heard by Gita who has a nervous breakdown. Dr. Kedar sees this and understands about Gita and Mohan. He tells Gita’s mother that if she truly wants to help her daughter then she will try to understand her needs and see what it is that Gita really wants. On gaining consciousness Gita takes the car and speeds in it to the sanatorium. Kedar sees her and follows. Gita’s car meets with an accident outside the sanatorium. She is brought in unconscious and wounded. Mohan was planning to leave for a couple of days to attend what he thinks is the marriage of Kedar and Gita. The Chief who’s heard his story earlier stops him and takes him to where Gita is lying covered in bandages with Kedar by her side. Kedar happily points out Mohan to Gita. The Chief leaves them telling Mohan to make sure that Gita never drives rashly again. Mohan promises.

== Cast ==
- K. L. Saigal as Mohan
- Leela Desai as Gita
- Najmul Hassan as Dr. Kedar
- Prithviraj Kapoor as chief doctor at the sanatorium
- Jagdish Sethi as radio station manager
- Nemo as Raibahadur Hiralal, Gita’s father
- Devbala as Gita’s mother
- Manorama Sr. as Gita’s Aunt
- Bikram Kapoor as the assistant doctor at the sanatorium

== Production ==
The producers needed raw stock for their films, so they tried to please the authorities in making films with subject to their liking. Even Nitin Bose had to deal with this situation. When the idea about tuberculosis was proposed as a propaganda film by Viceroy Lord Linlithgow, Nitin Bose wrote the story and used Pankaj Mullick's music and Saigal's voice. Nitin Bose who had earlier shown no interest in casting Saigal for his films having once stated that he could not use Saigal as his camera lens would crack at the sight of the "uncouth youth" signed him for several films after the success of Devdas (1935).

== Soundtrack ==
Pankaj Mullick gave the music for this film and also sang his version of the K. L. Saigal song "Karun Kya Aas Niraas Bhayi". The lyrics were written by Arzu (Arzoo) Lucknavi. All songs in the film were by K. L. Saigal.

=== Songs ===
- "Karun Kya Aas Niraas Bhayi"
- "Pyaari Pyaari Surato Moh Bhari Murato"
- "Sitam Thay, Zulm Thay"
- "Man Darpan Hai Jaago"
- "Preet Main Hain Jeevan Jokhum"
