= Nitin Bose =

Indian film director (1897–1986)

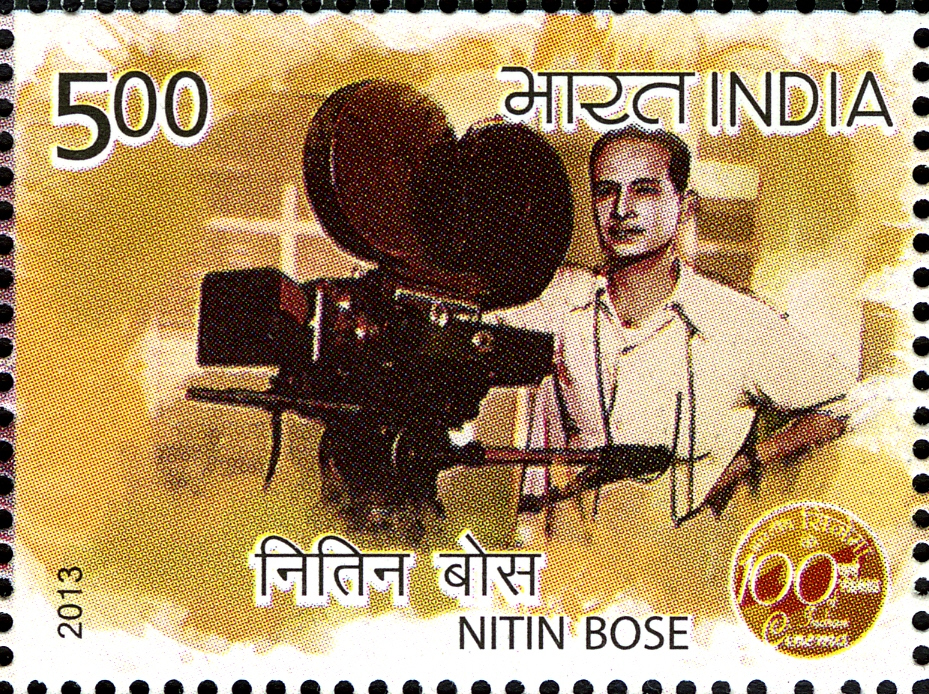
- Bose on a 2013 stamp of India
- Born: 26 April 1897; Dasnagar, Howrah, Bengal Presidency, British India (now West Bengal, India)
- Died: 14 April 1986 (aged 88); Calcutta, West Bengal, India
- Occupations: Film director, cinematographer, screenwriter
- Years active: 1930–1972

Nitin Bose (26 April 1897 – 14 April 1986) was an Indian film director, cinematographer and screenwriter of the nation's film industry. He was born in Calcutta and died in the same city. In the 1930s and early 40s, he worked with New Theatres, who made bilingual movies: in both Bengali and Hindi. Later, he moved to Bombay and directed under the banners of Bombay Talkies and Filmistan.

The first use of playback singing in Indian films occurred in films directed by Bose in 1935: first in Bhagya Chakra, a Bengali film, and later the same year in its Hindi remake, Dhoop Chhaon. His most well-known work is Ganga Jamuna.

== Early life ==
Nitin Bose was son of Bengali entrepreneur Hemendra Mohan Bose and Mrinalini Bose. Mrinalini was sister of writer Upendrakishore Raychowdhury, who was father of poet Sukumar Ray and grandfather of film director Satyajit Ray. Bose's another cousin was legendary children's author Leela Majumdar.

Bose had a great interest in photography from his childhood. His father, who was a keen photographer himself, nourished his son's interest in the same.

== Career ==
Bose's first venture in film direction was a documentary film on Belgian Emperor's visit to India (1921).

Bose started his film career as a cinematographer in 1926 in the movie Punarjanma. His debut as cinematographer under New Theatres banner was in the movie Devdas (1928). He was cinematographer of the only film directed by Rabindranath Tagore, Natir Puja (1932), which was based on a dance-drama composed by Tagore.

Bose worked closely with director Debaki Bose, but then Debaki Bose temporarily left New Theatres to Madan Theatres for making Seeta(1934). At this time, producer of New Theatres, B. N. Sircar asked Nitin Bose to venture into film direction. Bose started with remaking of Debaki Bose's Chandidas (1932) in Bengali to Chandidas in Hindi (1934).

His 1935 film Bhagya Chakra was the first Indian film to use playback singing. The singers were K C Dey, Parul Ghosh and Suprabha Sarkar. The movie was remade in Hindi with the title Dhoop Chhaon, which was the first Hindi film to use playback singing. It was Bose who came up with the idea of playback singing. He discussed with music director Raichand Boral and Bose's brother Mukul Bose, who was the sound recordist in New Theatres, implemented the idea.

During the making of Kashinath (1943), Bose had a misunderstanding with B N Sircar. After completion of the film, he did not go back to New Theatres, with which he was associated since it was established in 1931. Eventually, Bose moved to Bombay and Sircar closed New Theatres.

Bose's first movie under Bombay Talkies banner was Naukadubi (1947), based on Tagore's novel of the same name. Hindi version of this film was named Milan, in which Dilip Kumar acted in the lead role. His next film Drishtidan (1948) introduced Uttam Kumar, who later became superstar of Bengali Cinema.

In the 1960s, Bose directed a number of movies under the banner of Filmistan. Ganga Jamuna (1961), directed by Bose, is still considered one of the all-time blockbusters of Indian Cinema.

== Family ==
Bose was a son of Hemendra Mohan Bose, Bengali swadeshi entrepreneur and creator of the Kuntalin Puroshkar for literature. Satyajit Ray was a nephew of Bose and worked under him in the movie Mashaal (1950), which was produced by Bombay Talkies.

Among thirteen siblings of Bose, there was Rabindrasangeet singer (Malati Ghosal), one painter, sound recordist (Mukul Bose) and four cricketers (Kartik Bose et al.)

Bose's brother Mukul Bose was a pioneering and highly respected sound recordist who introduced many techniques in playback singing and voice dubbing. He leaves behind his wife Santi Bose, daughters Rina and Neeta and 6 grandchildren and 8 great-grandchildren.

== Awards ==
National Film Awards

- 1961: Certificate of Merit for Second Best Feature Film – Ganga Jamna
- Bose received Dadasaheb Phalke Award in 1977.

Filmfare Awards
Nominated

- Best Director – Ganga Jamna

== Filmography ==
=== Director ===
- Buker Bijha (1930)
- Daku Mansoor (1934)
- Chandidas (1934)
- Bhagya Chakra (1935)
- Dhoop Chhaon (1935) (Hindi remake of Bhagya Chakra)
- Didi (1937)
- President (1937) (Hindi remake of Didi; alternative title: Badi Bahen)
- Jiban Maran (1938)
- Desher Mati (1938)
- Dharti Mata (1938) (Hindi remake of Desher Mati)
- Dushman (1939) (Hindi remake of Jiban Maran)
- Kapal Kundala
- Parichay (1941)
- Lagan (1941) (Hindi remake of Parichay)
- Kashinath (1943)
- Bichar (1943) (Hindi title: Paraya Dhan)
- Mujrim (1944)
- Mazdoor (1945)
- Milan (1946)
- Noukadubi (1947 film) (Bengali remake of Milan)
- Drishtidan (1948)
- Mashaal (1950) (Bengali title: Samar)
- Deedar (1951)
- Dard-e-Dil (1953)
- Waris (1954)
- Amar Saigal (1955)
- Char Dost (1956)
- Madhabir Janye (1957)
- Kathputli (1957)
- Jogajog (1958)
- Gunga Jumna (1961) (alternative title: Ganga Jamuna, English title: The Confluence)
- Ummeed (1962)
- Nartaki (1963)
- Dooj Ka Chand (1964)
- Hum Kahan Ja Rahe Hain (1966)
- Samaanta (1972)

=== Documentary ===
- Belgian Emperor's Visit to India (1921)

=== Cinematographer ===
- Devdas (1928)
- Dena Paona (1931)
- Natir Puja (1932)
- Chirakumar Sabha (1932)
- Chandidas (1932)
- Yahudi Ki Ladki (1933)
- Rajrani Meera (1933)
- Puran Bhagat (1933)
- Meerabai (1933)
- Chandidas (1934)
- Bhagya Chakra (1935)
- Dhoop Chhaon (1935)
- Didi (1937)
- President a.k.a. Badi Bahen (1937)
- Jiban Maran (1938)
- Desher Mati (1938)
- Dharti Mata (1938)
- Dushman (1938)
- Parichay (1941)

=== Writer ===
- Dhoop Chhaon (1935) (screenplay)
- Bhagya Chakra (1935) (writer)
- Didi (1937) (writer)
- President a.k.a. Badi Bahen (1937) (writer)
- Jiban Maran (1938) (writer)
- Desher Mati (1938) (screenplay) (story)
- Dharti Mata (1938) (screenplay) (story)
- Dushman (1939) (writer)
- Parichay (1941) (writer)
- Kashinath (1943) (dialogue)
- Bichar (1943) (Hindi title: Paraya Dhan) (screenplay)

=== Camera and electrical department ===
- Mohabbat Ke Ansu (1932) (camera operator)
- Bichar (1943) (Hindi title: Paraya Dhan) (camera operator)

=== Miscellaneous crew ===
- Deedar (1951) (photographic treatment)
