= Vidyapati (1937 film) =

1937 Bengali language film

- Directed by: Debaki Bose
- Written by: Debaki Bose; Kazi Nazrul Islam
- Produced by: New Theatres
- Starring: Pahari Sanyal; Kanan Devi; Prithviraj Kapoor; Chhaya Devi; Leela Desai
- Cinematography: Yusuf Mulji
- Edited by: Subodh Mitter
- Music by: R. C. Boral
- Production company: New Theatres
- Distributed by: Kapurchand Ltd.
- Release date: 1937
- Running time: 141 min
- Country: India
- Languages: Bengali; Hindi

Bidyapati is a 1937 Bengali biopic film directed and co-written by Debaki Bose for New Theatres. It starred Pahari Sanyal as Vidyapati. His costars in the film were Kanan Devi, Prithviraj Kapoor, Chhaya Devi, Leela Desai, K. C. Dey and Kidar Sharma. The music was by R. C. Boral and lyrics by Kidar Sharma. Debaki Bose and Qazi Nazrul Islam wrote the story, screenplay and dialogues. The story is about the Maithili poet and Vaishnava saint Vidyapati. The songs of the film became popular and the lyrics though encapsulating Vidyapati's poetry were considered bold for its time. This ensured the film garnered crowds at the theatres making it a big success of 1937.

== Plot ==
King Shiva Singha (Prithviraj Kapoor) and his queen Lakshmi (Chhaya Devi) invite the poet Vidyapati (Pahari Sanyal) to their palace. He arrives with his constant companion Anuradha (Kanan Devi). The queen finds herself getting attracted to Vidyapati’s poetry and falls in love with him. This causes great anguish to the king who in his distress abandons his responsibilities and turns to Anuradha. The troubled queen decides to kill herself and when the Prime Minister gets to hear of it he encourages her as he feels that Vidyapati’s sensuous bold poetry has had a detrimental effect on the king. The king, in the end, sends for his queen through Anuradha. He notices that she is lying there in the same position and starts crying realizing the queen is dead. Anuradha and Shiva try getting Lakshmi to get up without success.

== Production ==
The film is thought to be Debaki Bose’s most adept directorial venture. The tight close-ups helped the narration of the story which focused on the poetry and songs. The films in those days tended to be heroine-centric and though the film was called Vidyapati the main star of the film was Kanan Devi. Her convincing performance became the main support of the film along with a strong script.

== Critical reception ==
Prithviraj Kapoor’s performance was rated high by Baburao Patel, the editor of Filmindia, while also appreciating the "newcomer" Mohammed Ishaq. He called Debaki Bose’s direction a "fine poem of art" and Bose "truly a great director".

The film was used by Guru Dutt in his film Kaagaz Ke Phool (1959) as a tribute to the Studio Era by showing the character Suresh in the balcony of the theatre where Vidyapati is being watched by a packed audience.

== Soundtrack ==
The music director R. C. Boral brought in western influences by making use of the organ and piano in his music direction. The impact was successful with popular as well as classic tunes being used and the songs were highly appreciated. The role of Anuradha which Kanan Devi enacted was created by Nazrul Islam. Her songs like "More Angana Mein Aaye Aali" and her duets with K. C. Dey made her the top female singing star on par with K. L. Saigal at New Theatres. Kidar Sharma left New Theatres following differences between him and Debaki Bose but not before making a tremendous name for himself following his lyrics in Devdas (1935) and Vidyapati.

=== Track listing ===
#	Title	Singer(s)
1	"Ambuvaa Ki Daali Daali Jhum Rahi Hai Aali"	Kanan Devi
2	"Darshan Hue Tihaare Saajan"	Pahari Sanyal
3	"Ek Din Raadhaa Ne Bansuriyaa, Ik Baans Ki Thi"	Pahari Sanyal
4	"Dole Hriday Ki Naiya"	Kanan Devi
5	"Madhu Ritu Aai Phaagun Ki Sakhi"	Pahadi Sanyal
6	"Panaghat Pe Kanhaiya Aata Hai"	K. C. Dey
7	"Anuradha O Anuradha, Gokul Se Gaye Giradhari"	K. C. Dey
8	"Rang"	Rampyari
