= Kapal Kundala (1939 film) =

- Directed by: Nitin Bose; Phani Majumdar
- Written by: Bankim Chandra Chattopadhyay
- Story by: Based on the novel Kapalkundala by Bankim Chandra Chattopadhyay
- Starring: Leela Desai; Sailen Choudhury; Najmul Hussain
- Music by: Pankaj Mullick
- Production company: New Theatres
- Release date: 1939
- Country: India
- Language: Hindi

Kapal Kundala is a Hindi romantic drama film jointly directed by Nitin Bose and Phani Majumdar based on the 1866 epic novel Kapalkundala by Bankim Chandra Chattopadhyay. The film was released in 1939 under the banner of New Theatres. The music composer was Pankaj Mullick. The film is well known for featuring Pankaj Mullick's celebrated song "Piya Milan Ko Jana", which became one of the best-known songs of early Indian cinema. Although the film is lost due to a fire accident at the New Theatres studio but the soundtrack survived.

== Plot ==
Kapal Kundala, a young woman raised in isolated jungle by a Tantric. She meets Nabakumar and rescues him. They fall in love and marry. After entering settled society, Kapal Kundala struggles to adapt to domestic life with Nabakumar, ultimately leading to a tragic conclusion.

== Cast ==
- Leela Desai as Kapal Kundala
- Najmul Hussain as Nabakumar
- Sailen Choudhury as Adhikari
- Kamlesh Kumari as Motibibi
- Panna Rani as Shyama
- Pankaj Mullick
- Jagdish Sethi
- Manorama
