= K. C. Dey =

Indian actor and singer (1893–1962)

Krishna Chandra Dey
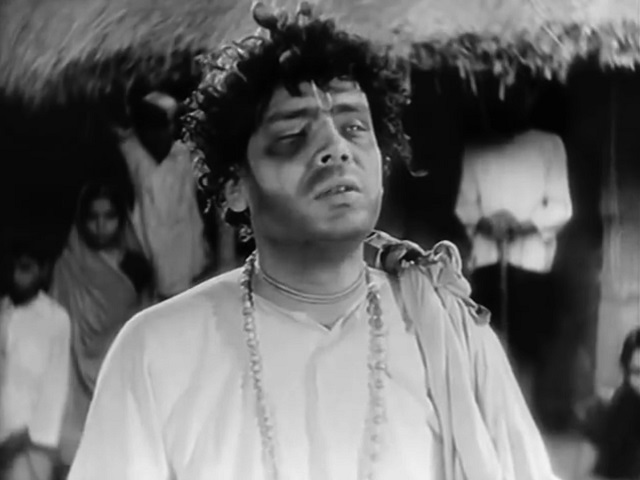
- Born: 24 August 1893; Calcutta, British India
- Died: 28 November 1962 (aged 69); Calcutta, West Bengal, India
- Occupations: Music director, musician, actor, singer and music teacher
- Relatives: Manna Dey (nephew)

Krishna Chandra Dey (24 August 1893 – 28 November 1962), better known as K. C. Dey, was an Indian music director, music composer, musician, singer, actor, and music teacher born in Calcutta (now Kolkata). He was S.D. Burman's first musical teacher and mentor. His father's name was Shibchandra Dey. In 1906, at the age of fourteen, he lost his eyesight and became completely blind. He worked for various theatre groups and finally went on to work for New Theatres in Kolkata until 1940. He is best remembered for his Kirtan songs. He was patronized by many elite families of Calcutta at that time. He often sang in Jalsa of Rajbari of Sovabazar, Mitra House of Beadon Street and many others. K. C. Dey recorded around 600 songs, mostly in Bengali, Hindi, Urdu, Gujarati and 8 Naats (Muslim religious songs).

Dey sang and composed music for movies from 1932 until 1946. He also acted in movies in the same period. Dey used to travel from Calcutta to Bombay (now Mumbai) to take part in movies. In 1942 he moved to Bombay. Dey quit movies in 1946 after the quality of both his music and singing started going down. The blind singer died in Kolkata on 28 November 1962. Playback singer Manna Dey was his nephew.

== Filmography ==
=== Actor ===
- Bhagaban Shrikrishna Chaitanya (1954)
- Prahlad (1952)
- Anirban (1948)
- Drishtidan (1948)
- Purabi (1948)
- Insaan (1944)... Blind singer
- Tamanna (1942)
- Chanakya (1939)... Beggar
- Sapera (1939)
- Sapurey (1939)... Ghantaburo ... a.k.a. The Snake-Charmer (India: English title)
- Desher Mati (1938)... Kunja... a.k.a. Mother Earth.. a.k.a. Motherland ... a.k.a. Soil of the Motherland
- Dharti Mata (1938)... Kunja
- Vidyapati (1937)... Madhusudan... a.k.a. Bidyapati
- Devdas (1936)
- Grihadaha (1936)
- Manzil (1936)
- Maya (1936/I)
- Maya (1936/II)
- Pujarin (1936)... Blind Beggar
- Bhagya Chakra (1935)... Surdas
- Devdas (1935)
- Dhoop Chhaon (1935)... Surdas
- Inquilab (1935)... Musafir
- Shaher Ka Jadoo (1934)... Baldev
- Nala Damayanti (1933)
- Puran Bhagat (1933)
- Sabitri (1933)... Dyumatsen
- Meera (1933)
- Chandidas (1932)... Sridam

=== Music department ===
- Bhagaban Shrikrishna Chaitanya (1954) (playback singer)
- Tamanna (1942)
- Sapurey (1939)
- Dharti Mata (1938)
- Vidyapati (1937)
- Bhagya Chakra (1935)
- Devdas (1935)
- Chandidas (1932)

=== Composer ===
- Purabi (1948)
- Shakuntala (1941)
- Milap (1937)
- Ambikapathy (1937) (Background music)
- Baghi Sipahi (1936)
- Sonar Sansar (1936)
- Sunehra Sansar (1936)
- Chandragupta (1934)
- Shaher Ka Jadoo (1934)
