= Dhoop Chhaon (1935 film) =

- Directed by: Nitin Bose
- Written by: Sudarshan (story); Nitin Bose (screenplay)
- Starring: Kapoor; Biswanath Bhadhuri; K.C.Dey; Sardar Aktar; Pahari Sanyal
- Release date: 1935
- Running time: 125 minutes
- Language: Hindi

Dhoop Chhaon or Bhagya Chakra (also Known as 'Sun and Shade' or 'Wheel of Fate') is a 1935 Hindi movie directed by Nitin Bose. It was a remake of the Bengali film Bhagya Chakra. Dhoop Chhaon was the first Hindi film to use playback singing. It was Bose who came up with the idea of playback singing. He discussed with music director Raichand Boral and Bose's brother Mukul Bose, who was the sound recordist in New Theatres, and who implemented the idea.

== Cast ==
- Kapoor as Hiralal
- Biswanath Bhadhuri as Shamlal
- K.C.Dey as Surdas
- Nawab as Manager
- Kedar as Asst. Manager
- Ajmat as Kallo-Ki-Ma
- Pahari Sanyal as Dipak
- Trilok Kapoor as Satyavan
- Uma Devi as Mira
- Babulal as Mr. Tewari
- Debbala as Mira's mother
- Indu Mukherjee as Detective
- Shyam Law as Detective
- Pramathesh Barua as guest at party (uncredited)
- K. L. Saigal as guest#2 (uncredited)
- Vikram Nahar as guest#3 (uncredited)
- Vaid as Client
- Nagendrabala as Nurse
- Wahab as Stage-Dipak
- Sardar Aktar as Stage Kallo-Ki-Ma
- Ahi Sanyal as Bad Singer
