= Jagdish Sethi =

Indian actor and director (1903–1969)

- Born: 15 January 1903; Bombay, Bombay Presidency, British India
- Died: 12 June 1969 (aged 66); Bombay, Maharashtra, India
- Occupations: Actor; director

Jagdish Sethi was an Indian actor and director.

== Filmography ==
=== Actor ===
Year	Film	Role
1971	Hum Tum Aur Woh	Board Member
1966	Mera Saaya	Judge
1965	Sikandar E Azam	Mentor of Greece
1964	Leader	
1964	Rahul	
1964	Awara Badal	Mann Singh / Makhan Singh
1962	Baat Ek Raat Ki	
1961	Batwara	Kishanchand
1960	Chaudhary Karnail Singh (Punjabi film)	Chaudhary Karnail Singh
1960	Kiklee	
1959	Kanhaiya	
1958	Phir Subha Hogi	Harbanslal
1958	Sitaron Se Aagey	Shyamlal
1958	Sahara	
1957	Baarish	Bihari / Boss
1957	Miss Mary	Rai Sahib
1957	Fashion	
1956	Shatranj	Pratapchand Chaudhary
1955	Sardar	
1954	Aar Paar	Lala
1954	Pensioner	
1954	Waris	Rana Himmat Singh
1954	Ilzam	
1952	Do Raha	
1952	Jaggu	
1952	Nau Bahar	
1950	Pardes	Lala Mangaldas "Manglu"
1949	Raat Ki Rani	
1948	Azadi Ki Raah Par	
1947	Zanjeer	
1946	Phir Bhi Apna Hai	
1946	Rangbhoomi	
1945	Amrapali	
1945	Chand Tara	Ratan's Father
1945	Neelam	
1944	Chal Chal Re Naujawan	Thakur Jaipal Singh
1944	Kadambari	
1944	Maa Baap	
1943	Abroo	Dharamdas
1943	Inkaar	
1943	Namaste	
1943	Bichar	
1942	Kirti	
1942	Return of Toofan Mail	
1942	Station Master	
1942	Tamanna	
1941	Ghar Ki Laaj	
1941	Kurmai	
1941	Sajjan	
1940	Chambe Di Kali	
1940	Nartaki	Seth Heeralal
1939	Badi Didi	
1939	Jawani Ki Reet	Jagabandhu
1939	Kapal Kundala	
1938	Adhikar	
1938	Dharti Mata	
1938	Dushman	
1938/I	Street Singer	(Hindi version) (as Jagdish)
1937	Anath Ashram	Jai Narain (as Jagdish)
1937	Badi Bahen	Dr. Shethy
1937/II	Mukti	Mr Mallick
1937	President	Dr. Jagdish Sethi
1936	Bhole Bhale	Swaroop's uncle (as Jagdish)
1936/I	Karodpati	
1936	Maya	
1936	Pujarin	
1935	Jahanara	(as Jagdish B.A.)
1935	Josh-E-Inteqam	(as Jagdish)
1934	Anokha Prem	(as Jagdish)
1932	Shikari	(as Jagdish)
1931	Anangsena	(as Jagdish)
1931	Draupadi	Duryodhana (as Jagdish)
1931	Alam Ara	

=== Director ===
Year	Film
1952	Insaan
1952	Jaggu
1947	Do Dil
