= Leela Desai =

American-Indian actress

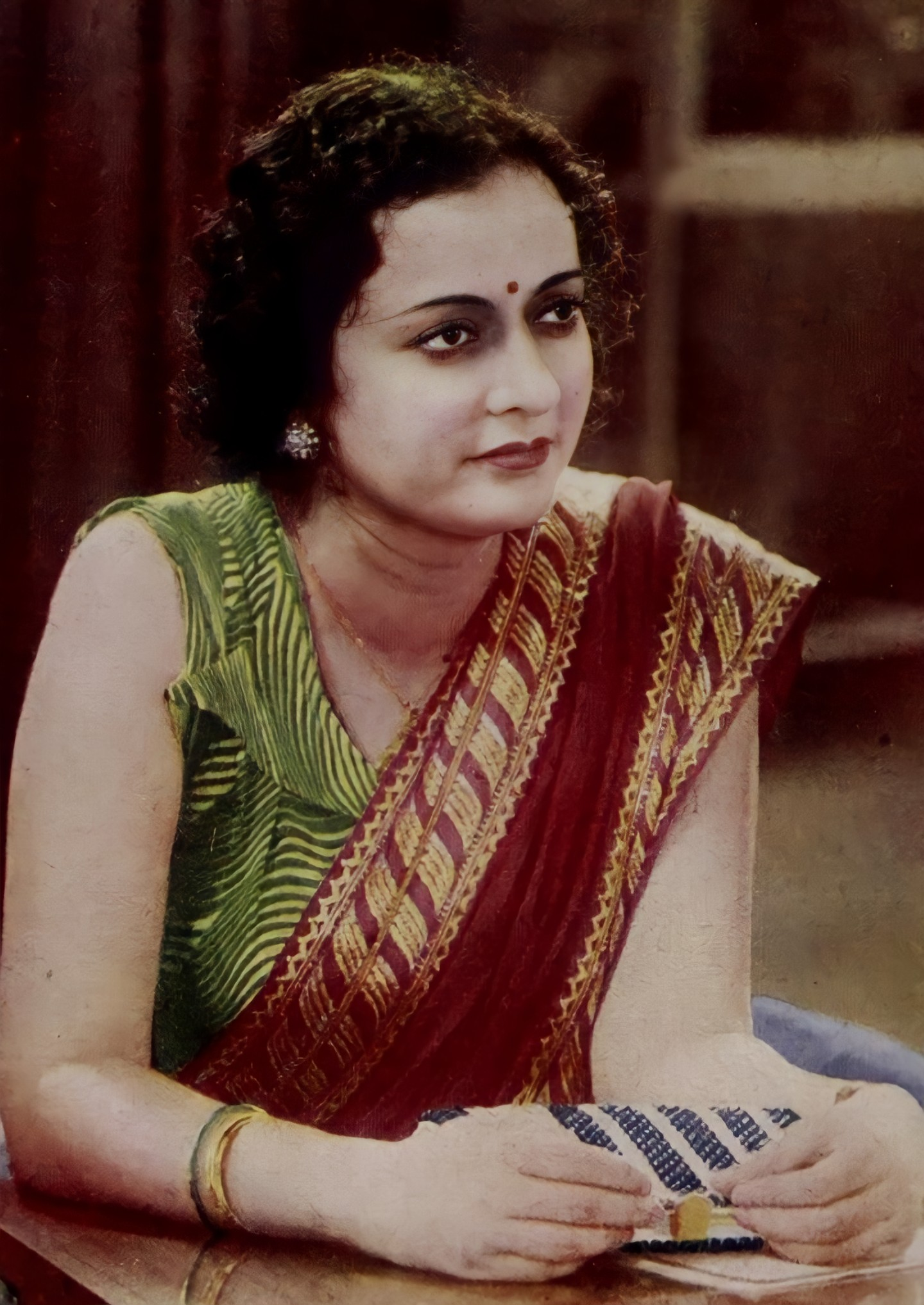
Leela Desai in Dushman (1939)

Leela Desai, aka Lila Desai, was an Indian actress in the 1930s and 1940s. She was the daughter of Umedram Lalbhai Desai and his second wife Satyabala Devi, a musician of the early 1900s.

== Early life ==
Desai was born in Newark, New Jersey when her parents were on a 3-year American tour. Her father was a Gujarati and her mother was from Bihar, India. She grew up in India. She acted in 11 Indian movies and was the associate producer of the movie Kabuliwala in 1961. In 1944, Leela also acted in the movie Kaliyan with her sister Ramola. Ramola also acted in the film Lalkar in the same year.

== Career ==
Desai had formal education in classical Hindustani dancing under Sohanlal and Lacchumaharaj, and Academic education in Music in Marris College of Music, Lucknow (now Bhatkhande Sanskriti Vishwavidyalaya). She acted in the movie Nagagnarayan, produced by Vishram Bedekar in 1943. "Leela Desai had been invited by the students of the Intermediate College in 1941. Bangalore had the distinction of holding festivals of films made by New Theatres' and Prabhat Film Co."

"B.N. Sircar's empire introduced personalities of the stature of P.C. Barua, Bimal Roy, Debaki Bose, Leela Desai, Phani Majumdar, Timir Baran, Umashashi, Nitin Bose, K.L. Saigal, Pankaj Mullick, Nemo, Sisir Kumar Bhaduri and Jamuna, all of whom later earned all India fame, under the banner of New Theatres. Among his technical achievements were the bringing of sound to Calcutta for Bengali films, and the introduction of the playback system. The elephant logo of New Theatres acted as a magnet to draw crowds throughout the country." More about B. N. Sircar

Desai was a dancer and a follower of Sohan Lal.

"The third Kapal Kundala (1939 film) released after a decade from the first Kapal Kundala in 1939. This time the movie was directed by both Nitin Bose and Phani Majumdar. Desai played the role of Kapal Kundala."

Phani Majumdar married Desai's sister Monica Desai.

Desai was trained in the Bhatkhande Music Institute established in Lucknow in 1926, which is known for its role in training generations of performing artists, gurus and composers. Lucknow has contributed music directors such as Naushad, Madan Mohan and Roshan, actors and actresses such as Kumar, Iftekar, Akhtari Bai, Bina Rai, Yashodhara Katju and Swaranlata, singers such as Talat Mahmud, Anup Jalota, Dilraj Kaur and Krishna Kalle), writers such as Amritlal Nagar, Bhagawati Sharan Varma and Achala Nagar), as well as lyricists and dancers. Lachhu Maharaj was a choreographer for many films. Pahadi Sanyal, Leela Desai and Kamlesh Kumari of New Theatres at Calcutta were all trained here.

Desai owned a house in Darjeeling called "Lily Cottage". Her mother Satyabala Devi lived there until her death. It is possible that Lila knew Manjula or Sumitra Sanyal in Darjeeling. Lila Desai is mentioned in Bollywood actress Sumitra Sanyal's site.

"What shall be said of Leela Desai, who acted the part of the President's sister, the mischievous school-girl, and who always took the active part in the love-making between her and Prakash Babu (Saigal)? I cannot find a single fault with her acting. She played up to Saigal splendidly. Even her eyes were most expressive. What naughtiness was in them? As a shameless hussy she could give points to any of your Hollywood actresses–and win. In the love-duet between her and Saigal it was she who always led. She was the personification of Mr. Barnard Shaw's pet notion that, in this eternal amorous game, it is the woman who leads the man on and not, as is commonly supposed, the other way about. From the moment she jumped down her school garden-wall and almost fell plump into the arms of Prakash Babu, who was sitting below chewing the end of his reflections anent his dismissal from his job, she never, in a manner of speaking, left him to himself. She would bring down the house with her: "Uske bad kya hua, Prakash Babu?" The poor man had to dance to her measure ever afterwards. When she found herself with him alone she gave us the impression of having fed on honey-dew and on the milk of paradise. Then, in addition to her sparkling dialogue and supremely "alive" acting, she was gorgeous in her dancing performance. Her whole face was a mirror in which her thoughts were reflected. She was an imp of mischief from commencement to conclusion."

== Sources ==
- https://web.archive.org/web/20090530020703/http://www.ultraindia.com/movies/awards/bnsin.htm
- Article Title
- https://web.archive.org/web/20080610143306/http://ccat.sas.upenn.edu/indiancinema/?browse=musicdirection&start=K
- http://calcuttatube.com/
- https://web.archive.org/web/20110722222919/http://www.nbc.gov.mv/app.php?action=films&do=detail&filmId=5141
- https://web.archive.org/web/20080610130205/http://www.tasleemlucknow.com/musicbottom.htm
