= Devi Chaudhurani (disambiguation) =

Devi Chaudhurani is an 1884 novel by Bankim Chandra Chatterjee.

Devi Chaudhurani or Devi Chowdhurani may also refer to:

- Debi Chowdhurani (1949 film), a Bengali historical drama film
- Devi Chowdhurani (1974 film), an Indian Bengali-language film adaptation
- Debi Chowdhurani (TV series), an Indian Bengali-language television series
- Devi Chowdhurani (2025 film), an Indian Bengali-language film
