= Bengal Film Journalists' Association – Best Actress Award =

Annual Indian film award

BFJA Award for Best Actress
- Awarded for: Best Performance by an Actress in a Leading Role
- Country: India
- Presented by: BFJA
- First award: 1942 (for performances in films released around 1941)
- Currently held by: Jaya Ahsan
- Website: BFJA award winners

The Bengal Film Journalists' Association Awards (also known as BFJA awards) is the oldest association of film critics in India, founded in 1937. Bengal Film Journalists' Association – Best Actress Award is given to recognize a female actor who has delivered an outstanding performance in a leading role. The award was first given in 1942 for the films released in 1941.

Frequent winners of this award are Aparna Sen (5 awards), Madhabi Mukherjee, Rituparna Sengupta (4 awards each), Suchitra Sen, Debashree Roy, Laboni Sarkar, and Sandhya Roy (3 awards each).

== Year-wise winners ==
Year	Image of the recipient	Recipient	Film	Ref.
1942		Kanan Devi	Parichay	
1943		Kanan Devi	Shesh Uttar	
1944				
1945		Sumitra Devi	Sandhi	
1946		Chandrabati Devi	Dui Purush	
1947		Sunanda Devi	Biraj Bou	
1948		Sumitra Devi	Pather Dabi	
1949				
1950		Sumitra Devi	Swami	
1951				
1952				
1953				
1954				
1955				
1956				
1957				
1958				
1959				
1960		Suchitra Sen	Deep Jwele Jai	
1961		Supriya Devi	Meghe Dhaka Tara	
1962		Suchitra Sen	Saptapadi	
1963		Arundhati Mukherjee	Bhagini Nibedita	
1964		Suchitra Sen	Uttar Phalguni	
1965		Madhabi Mukherjee	Charulata	
1966		Madhabi Mukherjee	Subarnarekha	
1967		Madhabi Mukherjee	Joradighir Chowdhury Paribar	
1968		Moushumi Chatterjee	Balika Badhu	
1969		Supriya Devi	Teen Adhyay	
1970		Aparna sen	Aparachito	
1971		Madhabi Mukherjee	Dibaratrir Kabya	
1972		Sandhya Roy	Nimantran	
1973		Suchitra Sen	Alo Amar Alo	
1974		Babita	Ashani Sanket	
1975		Aparna Sen	Sujata	
1976		Sandhya Roy	Sansar Seemantey	
1977				
1978				
1979		Gita Siddharth	Baarbadhu	
1980		Sandhya Roy	Ganadevata	
1981		Mahua Roy Choudhury	Dadar Kirti	
1982		Sumitra Mukherjee	Boishakhi Megh	
1983				
1984				
1985				
1986		Raakhee	Paroma	
1987		Sriparna Bandopadhay	Kony	
1988		Aparna Sen	Ekanto Apan	
1989		Alokananda Dutt	Phera	
1990				
1991				
1992		Debashree Roy	Thikana	
1993		Aparna Sen	Shwet Patharer Thala	
1994		Laboni Sarkar	Kancher Prithibi	
1995		Laboni Sarkar	Wheel Chair	
1996		Indrani Haldar	Charachar	
1996		Laboni Sarkar	Charachar	
1997		Debashree Roy	Unishe April	
1998		Indrani Dutta	Sedin Chaitramas	
1999		Rituparna Sengupta	Dahan	
2000		Debashree Roy	Asukh	
2001		Aparna Sen	Paromitar Ek Din	
2002		Konkona Sen Sharma	Ek Je Achhe Kanya	
2003		Indrani Haldar	Sajhbatir Rupkatha	
2004		Rituparna Sengupta	Aalo	
2005		Churni Ganguly	Waarish	
2006		Rituparna Sengupta	Dwitiya Basanta	
2007		Sreelekha Mitra	Kantataar	
2013		Koel Mallik	Hemlock Society	
2013		Rituparna Sengupta	Muktodhara	
2017		Rituparna Sengupta	Praktan	
2018		Jaya Ahsan	Bishorjan	

== See also ==
- Bengal Film Journalists' Association Awards
- Cinema of India

== Bibliography ==
- Chowdhury, Ashok (1982). Paribartan.
