= Hamrahi =

Hamrahi (lit. 'compatriot') may refer to:

- Hamrahi (1945 film), an Indian Hindi-language social drama film
- Hamrahi (1963 film), an Indian Hindi-language drama film starring Rajendra Kumar
- Hamrahi (1974 film), an Indian Hindi-language drama film starring Randhir Kapoor
