= Carey Saheber Munshi =

Bengali film

Carey Saheber Munshi is a Bengali historical drama film directed by Bikash Roy based on a novel of the same name by Pramathanath Bishi. This film was released on 20 January 1961 under the banner of Bikas Roy Productions Private Limited.

== Plot ==
The movie revolves around the historic story of British India. The protagonist of the film is Ramram Basu who is the manager (or munshi) of William Carey, a Churchman from England. Ramram, a man of modern thoughts faces serious problems to spread education among the Bengali people. But his fight is going on against cruel customs and rituals of Bengal.

== Cast ==
- Chhabi Biswas
- Manju Dey
- Pahari Sanyal
- Tulsi Chakraborty
- Bikash Roy
- Kali Banerjee
- Nitish Mukhopadhyay
- Tandra Burman
- Amit Dey
