= Devi Chaudhurani =

1884 novel by Bankim Chandra Chattopadhyay

- Cover of the book
- Author: Bankim Chandra Chatterjee
- Language: Bengali
- Genre: Novel (Nationalist)
- Publication date: 1884
- Publication place: India
- Media type: Print (Paperback)

Devi Chaudhurani is a Bengali novel written by Bankim Chandra Chatterjee and published in 1884. It was later translated into English by Subodh Chunder Mitter. Following closely after Anandamath, Bankim Chandra renewed his call for a resurgent India that would resist the oppression of the British Empire through the strength of the common people, drawing on traditional Indian values of austerity, dedication and selflessness. Considered a significant work in both Bengali and Indian literature, the novel was banned by the British for inspiring patriotic sentiment. The ban was lifted after India's independence. In the story, Bankim Chandra emphasises that armed resistance against the British Army was, in his view, the only way to achieve independence.

Notably, Bankim Chandra made the leader of the struggle a woman — the protagonist — at a time when most women remained behind purdah and rarely interacted with men outside their families. This portrayal inspired many women to join the independence movement in later decades.

== Plot summary ==
Prafulla is married but shunned by her wealthy father-in-law, Haraballabh, due to a dispute with her mother on the day of the wedding. By the custom of the time, a married woman could neither be divorced nor remarried. Heartbroken over her daughter's fate, Prafulla's mother dies a few years later.

Determined to seek her in-laws, whom she has never met, Prafulla runs away at night, carrying no money and knowing only the name of the village and her father-in-law. Along the way, strangers help her, in line with the then-prevailing custom of treating unknown women with the respect accorded to one's own mother. Haraballabh rejects her and advises her to steal to survive. After enduring many hardships, she meets the bandit leader Bhavani Thakur, who adopts her and educates her in mathematics, philosophy, science, literature, and even wrestling.

Eventually, she becomes queen of the dacoits, known as Devi Chaudhurani, a Robin Hood–like figure who takes from the rich to help the poor. She lives simply and remains humble. In the climax, Devi agrees to help her father-in-law (unaware of her identity), but he betrays her location to the British. The British Army surrounds her boat, but her disguised guards trap and capture the soldiers, including the commanding Major, without bloodshed. She secures her husband Braja and father-in-law's freedom on the condition that Braja remarries her. Upon returning, she is accepted into the family, and under her guidance, both the household and village prosper.

== Commentary ==
The novel shows Bankim Chandra at ease weaving a complex narrative combining humour, family drama, cultural detail, and political message. Unlike Anandamath, it depicts an alternate government led by an ideal leader rooted in Indian values and directly supported by the people. By portraying a female leader in a conservative society, he drew on the examples of historical warrior queens.

He envisioned defeating the British Army with honour and compassion, avoiding total destruction, recognising that many soldiers were Indian. In history, Mahatma Gandhi took a nonviolent approach, rejecting armed militancy and condemning the tactics of revolutionaries like Khudiram Bose and Surya Sen.

== Adaptations ==
- The novel was first adapted into the feature film Debi Chowdhurani, in 1949 starring Sumitra Devi in the title role.
- It was adapted into Debi Chowdhurani (1974), directed by Dinen Gupta and starring Suchitra Sen as the lead, with Ranjit Mallick as Brajeswar, Kali Banerjee as Haraballabh, and Basanta Chowdhury as Bhabani Pathak.
- In Satyajit Ray’s 1966 film Nayak, the plot features a scene where the protagonist plays Braja opposite a senior actor as Haraballabh in a stage adaptation of Devi Chaudhurani.
- A 13-episode Hindi radio play adaptation was broadcast on All India Radio in 1990, adapted by Keshav Pandey and directed by Suraj Purohit, with Manasi Upadhyay, Ratna Bhushan, Kishore Namit, Madhu Srivastava, and Krishna Sharma in the cast.
- A voice play adaptation was staged at 34/1 Elgin Road, Kolkata on 4 April 2014.
- The 2018 Bengali television series Debi Chowdhurani aired on Star Jalsha.
- It was adapted into the Amar Chitra Katha comic series in its 659th issue, written by Debrani Mitra.
- A 2025 film adaptation, Devi Chaudhurani: Bandit Queen of Bengal, was directed by Subhrajit Mitra and starred Srabanti Chatterjee in the title role.
