= Pather Dabi =

1926 novel by Sarat Chandra Chattopadhya

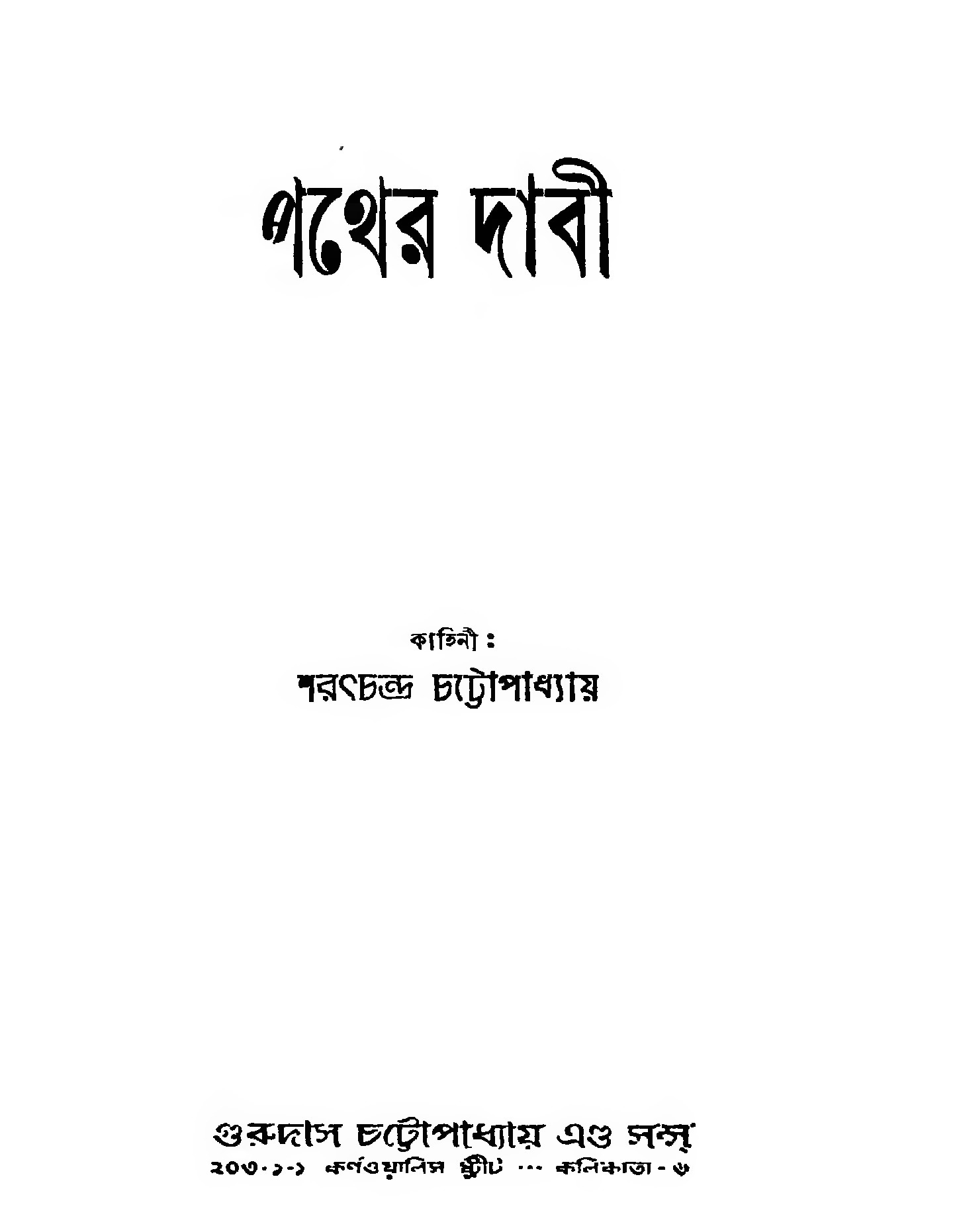
- The first page
- Author: Sarat Chandra Chattopadhyay
- Language: Bengali
- Publication date: 1926

Pather Dabi (The Right of Way; or Demands of the Road) is a Bengali novel written by Sarat Chandra Chattopadhyay. It was first published as a novel in 1926, after having been initially serialized in the journal Bangabani. The book is set in British-occupied India.

== Content ==
The book is about a secret society named Pather Dabi whose goal is to free India from British rule and Sarat Chandra Chattopadhyay played a great role for making a Revolutionary mind in young Indians, which gives an effort to the Indians to free from this torture by British. Sarat Chandra Chattopadhyay helped to create an independent consciousness among the Indians.And he also mentioned that independence is the only way to save Indians and also mentioned that proper relationship is not only family relations but also a relation with anyone who is struggling to save India from the British rule, through the words of his novel.The leader of the organization is Sabyasachi Mallick, who is described as being highly educated, having studied medicine, engineering, and law in Europe and America. Sabyasachi is also endowed with physical strength and courage which enable him to elude British intelligence. His physical feats include swimming across a torrential river, and traversing the Eastern Himalayas on foot.

Another major character, Apurba, a member of Pather Dabi, described as a contemptible figure. Emotional and impressionable, Apurba grieves at the colonial rule. He is, however, also weak, timid, and venal. A scene in the book depicts him being humiliated at a railway station by white youth. His obsession with caste purity even during illness and danger is depicted with contempt. Eventually, Apurba becomes a police informer. The main narrative in the book follows Apurba with Sabyasachi appearing unexpectedly, and disappearing as mysteriously.

Sabyasachi does not believe in the caste system, and towards the end of the book pleads for the destruction of "all that is eternal (sanatan), ancient, and decaying--[in] religion, society, tradition" on the ground that these are "enemies of the nation."

Other important characters in the novel are Sumitra and Bharati, who work alongside men in defiance of the traditional social conventions of the day. Sumitra is described as being beautiful and intelligent, besides being a nationalist. In the book, Sumitra makes an impassioned argument for why it is appropriate for a woman to leave a loveless marriage.

According to a review of the book in the Indian Express:

The story touches upon contemporary issues ranging from untouchability, orthodoxy and faith to rich-poor divide and the status of women in the society, criticising the British policies and also India's inherent customs of religion and social structure with the same intensity.

== Characters ==
- Apurba was a staunch Hindu but a fearful and feeble youth who hated Britishers. He loved his mother Karunamayi unconditionally but was mocked by his brother and sister- in law for his orthodox views. He got a job in Yangon, Myanmar, where he met with Bharti, a Hindu Bengali girl who was adopted by a Christian. One day, at the railway station he was thrashed for sitting on a bench meant for whites only. He also met with Savyasachi or 'Daktar', who was a nationalist and was influenced by him. Initially, he had a constant conflict with Bharti and her family but after the death of Bharti's parents they come close to each other. With the help of Bharti he become a member of Pather Dabi or Path Ke Davedar, a secret association who works for India's freedom and for the rights of laborers. The association had very harsh rule and they did not forgive betrayal. Apurba one day, was arrested by Police and he revealed all the secrets about his association. He was arrested by Pather Dabi, but due to Bharti and Savyasachi he was released but was boycotted by the association. He returned to India but came back after some days. His mother died shortly after, leaving him devastated. He reconciled with Bharati and Promised to Savyasachi that he will dedicate his life towards the welfare of the peasants of the country.
- Sabyasachi or Daktar was an educated and intelligent person who owned many degrees but was a revolutionary who worked for freedom of India. He was an important member of Pather Dabi. He was loved by Sumitra, the president of Pather Dabi. He considered Bharti as his sister. He was a good friend of Apurba and was much respected by him.
- Bharti was an important member of Pather Dabi. She considered Sumitra her sister and Doctor as her brother. She loved Apurba. She was an extroverted, intelligent, strong and caring girl.
- Talvalkar He was a Marathi man, Apurba's colleague and a good friend. He was married and had a little daughter. He had a revolutionary mind, and had served a prison sentence because of it. He joined Pather Dabi with the help of Apurba. He started revolt while addressing the people resulting in his arrest. He was beaten up by police harshly but was later released.
- Sumitra (original name - Roz Daud) was initially a drug dealer but later become the president of Pather Dabi when she was rescued by Doctor while smuggling. She loved Sabyasachi secretly. She was a daring and patriotic lady.
- Karunamayi was the loving and caring mother of Apurba. She was a staunch Hindu but was never supported by her husband, daughter- in laws and children except Apurba.
- Vinod was the brother of Apurba

== Reception ==
- The first edition of the book, comprising 5,000 copies, was sold out within a week. Subsequent to this, the book was banned on 4 January 1927 by British Government after due consultation of the then Advocate General of Bengal.
- Tanika Sarkar, while analyzing the character of Sabyasachi, has observed: "Capable, literally of everything, [Sabyasachi] is the first superman in serious Bengali fiction, always a million times larger than life.
- It has been suggested that Sabyasachi's usage of various disguises to escape police detection have conspicuous parallels with the modus operandi of Surya Sen.
- The Fazlul Huq ministry lifted the ban on March 1, 1939, a year after Sarat Chandra's death.

== Sarat Chandra and Tagore ==
A correspondence between Sarat Chandra and Rabindranath Tagore took place after the ban imposed on the book. Tagore justified the ban on the book, on the ground that it was a seditious book, while Sarat justified his book on the ground that "throughout India, large numbers of people are being imprisoned or externed by the government on flimsy grounds without trial or in flagrant miscarriage of justice." Sarat agreed with Tagore's assessment that the book caused the reader to become disenchanted with the British government, stating that this indeed was his intention in writing it.

== Screen adaptation ==
Year	Title	Language	Director	Cast			Ref.
Year	Title	Language	Director	Sabyasachi	Apurbo	Bharati	Ref.
1947	Pather Dabi	Bengali	Satish Dasgupta, Digambar Chatterjee	Devi Mukherjee	Mihir Bhattacharya	Sumitra Devi	
1948	Sabyasachi	Hindi	Agradoot	Kamal Mitra	Paresh Banerjee	Sandhyarani	
1977	Sabyasachi	Bengali	Pijush Basu	Uttam Kumar	Kiran Lahiri	Jayashree Kabir	
2026	Emperor vs Sarat Chandra	Bengali	Srijit Mukherji	Abir Chatterjee	Rik Chatterjee	Divyani Mondal	
