= Sonamoni Saha =

Indian actress

Sona Moni Saha
- Born: Sonarpur, West Bengal
- Occupation: Actress
- Years active: 2018–present
- Known for: Debi Choudhurani; Mohor; Shubho Bibaho

Sona Moni Saha is an Indian film and television actress. She is best known for her work on Bengali television soap operas such as Debi Choudhurani, Mohor and Shubho Bibaho.

== Television ==
=== Serials ===
Year	Serial	Role	Channel	Notes	Ref.
2018–2019	Debi Chowdhurani	Prafulla aka Debi Chowdhurani	Star Jalsha	Lead Role	Debut
2019–2022	Mohor	Mohor	Star Jalsha	Lead Role	
2023–2024	Ekka Dokka	Dr. Radhika	Star Jalsha	Lead Role	
2024–2026	Shubho Bibaho	Sudhamoyee aka Sudha	Star Jalsha	Lead Role	
2026	Bigg Boss Bangla season 3	Contestant	Star Jalsha	10th place	

=== Mahalaya ===
Year	Title	Role	Channel	Notes
2022	Ya Chandi	Devi Mahisasuramardini	Star Jalsha	

== Awards ==
Year	Award Name	Category	Role	Show
2021	Kolkata Glitz Awards	Best Juti - Popular Choice	Mohor-Sankha	Mohor
2022	West Bengal Tele Academy Awards	Best Actress	Mohor	Mohor
2022	Star Jalsha Parivaar Awards	Best Juti - Jury Choice	Mohor-Sankha	Mohor
2023	Kolkata Glitz Awards	Best Juti (Best Pair) - Popular Choice	Mohor-Sankha	Mohor
2025	Star Jalsha Parivaar Awards	Star Bouma	Sudhamoyee	Shubho Bibaho
2025	West Bengal Tele Academy Awards	Priyo Maa	Sudhamoyee	Shubho Bibaho
2025	West Bengal Tele Academy Awards	Best Actress	Sudhamoyee	Shubho Bibaho
2025	West Bengal Tele Academy Awards	Priyo Bou	Sudhamoyee	Shubho Bibaho
2026	Star Jalsha Parivaar Awards	Star Bouma	Sudhamoyee	Shubho Bibaho
2026	Star Jalsha Parivaar Awards	Priyo Boudi	Sudhamoyee	Shubho Bibaho
