= Ruma Guha Thakurta =

Indian actress and singer (1934–2019)

- Born: Ruma Ghosh; 21 November 1934; Calcutta, Bengal Presidency, British India
- Died: 3 June 2019 (aged 84); Kolkata, West Bengal, India
- Occupations: Actress; singer
- Spouse(s): Kishore Kumar (m. 1950; div. 1958) Arup Guha Thakurta (m. 1960, died 2004)
- Children: 3, including Amit Kumar
- Musical career
- Genre: Film music
- Instrument: Vocalist
- Years active: 1944–2019

Ruma Guha Thakurta (21 November 1934 – 3 June 2019) was an Indian actress and singer primarily associated with Bengali language films. She founded Calcutta Youth Choir in 1958.

== Early life ==
Ruma Guha Thakurta was born as Ruma Ghosh on 3 November 1934 to Satyen Ghosh (Monty Ghosh) and singer Sati Devi. Her family was culturally inclined to Brahmo Samaj, a societal component of Brahmoism. Her mother Sati was eldest sister of Bijoya Ray, the wife of Satyajit Ray.

Guha Thakurta was a trained vocalist and a dancer. She started training in music at Swarabitan in Kolkata, which had been established by her parents. In later years, she studied under Abdul Rehman Khan of Patiala gharana, the Ustad of Nirmla Devi and Lakshmi Shankar in Bombay. She also trained in dance at "Uday Shankar India Cultural Centre" at Almora.

She married Kishore Kumar in 1951 and had a son Amit Kumar by this marriage. The couple divorced in 1958 and she married Arup Guha Thakurta in 1960. The couple had two children, Ayan and Sromona. Sromona is also a singer.

== Career ==
Guha Thakurta made her acting debut in Amiya Chakravarty's Jwar Bhata (1944) at age ten. This was the debut film of Dilip Kumar. Her next film as Ruma Ghosh was Nitin Bose, whose first cousin was her aunt's father-in-law,'s Mashaal (1950) in Hindi, which had a Bengali version called Samar, adapted from Bankim Chandra Chattopadhyay's novel Rajani. She portrayed a blind girl, Sarla.

After her divorce, Ruma moved to Calcutta to act in Rajen Tarafdar’s Ganga based on Samaresh Bose’s eponymous cult novel. She acted as one of two leading ladies, with Sandhya Roy. Ganga won the National award for Best Feature Film that year and Ruma's portrayal of Himi received critical acclamation. In the same year, she acted in Personal Assistant opposite to Bhanu Bandopadhayay and in Khaniker Atithi by Tapan Sinha.

Her film career revived in 1962 with Benarasi, produced by her and directed by her husband. It was the tale of a courtesan who tries to lead a life of dignity and respect, when her childhood sweetheart, Ratan, takes her away from her terrible environment. It flopped, but won the BFJA Award for Best Feature Film the following year.

== Filmography ==
=== As an actress ===
Year	Title	Role	Director	Language	Notes
1944	Jwar Bhata		Amiya Chakrvarty	Hindi	
1950	Mashaal	Sarala Das	Nitin Bose	Hindi	
1950	Afsar		Chetan Anand	Hindi	
1952	Rag Rang	Digvijay	Ruma Devi	Hindi	
1959	Personal Assistant	Rumali Sen		Chitrakar Bengali	(as Ruma Devi)
1959	Khaniker Atithi	Mita	Tapan Sinha	Bengali	(as Ruma Ganguly)
1959	Ganga	Rajen Tarafdar	Himi	Bengali	
1960	Benarasi	Sona	Arup Guhathakurta	Bengali	
1962	Banarasi				
1962	Abhijan	Neeli	Satyajit Ray	Bengali	
1962	Benarasi				
1963	Polatak	Moyna	Tarun Majumder	Bengali	
1963	Nirjan Saikate	Chhoto Bou	Tapan Sinha	Bengali	
1964	Kinu Gowalar Gali	Theater Actress	O. C Ganguly	Bengali	
1964	Subha O Debatar Gras				
1964	Sindoore Megh				
1964	Prabhater Rang		Ajoy Kar	Bengali	
1966	Joradighir Chowdhury Paribar		Ajit Lahiri	Bengali	
1967	Antony Firingee	Jogweshwari	Sunil Bannerjee	Bengali	
1967	Balika Badhu		Tarun Majumdar	Bengali	
1967	Ashite Ashiona			Bengali	
1968	Hangsa Mithun			Bengali	
1968	Garh Nasimpur			Bengali	
1968	Panchashar		Arup Guhathakurta	Bengali	
1968	Baghini		Bijoy Bose	Bengali	
1969	Arogya Niketan	Pradyot's mother	Bijoy Bose	Bengali	
1973	Nishi Kanya				
1974	Jadi Jantem	Ranu Basu	Yatrik	Bengali	
1976	Bairaag	Pushpa	Asit Sen	Hindi	
1979	Dour				
1980	Dadar Kirti	Saraswati, Beena's Mother	Tarun Majumdar	Bengali	
1980	Bandhan				
1981	36 Chowringhee Lane	Nandita's Mother		English	
1981	Swami Stree			Bengali	
1981	Maa Bipat Tarini Chandi				
1982	Troyee			Bengali	
1982	Amrita Kumbher Sandhane			Bengali	
1983	Samarpita			Bengali	
1984	Paar				
1984	Didi				
1985	Bhalobasa Bhalobasa	Keya's Mother		Bengali	
1986	Anurager Chhonya			Bengali	
1987	Gayok		Shantanu Bhowmick		
1987	Amar Sangi	Jhilik's Mother	Sujit Guha	Bengali	
1987	Ekanto Apon	Ranajoy's Mother	Biresh Chattopadhyay	Bengali	
1988	Agun				
1988	Tumi Koto Sundar				
1988	Aagoon		Victor Banerjee	Bengali	
1989	Ganashatru	Maya Gupta	Satyajit Ray	Bengali	
1989	Asha O Bhalobasha	Roopa's Mother	Sujit Guha	Bengali	
1989	Aakrosh	Samrat's Foster Mother	Sujit Guha	Bengali	
1990	Anuraag				
1990	Garmil				
1990	Papi				
1990	Abhishkar				
1991	Path O Prasad			Bengali	
1991	Bidhilipi				
1992	Indrajit		Anjan Choudhury	Bengali	
1994	Wheel Chair	Sushmita's Mother	Tapan Sinha		
1995	Sangharsha		Haranath Chakraborty	Bengali	
1996	Himghar			Bengali	
1998	Choudhury Paribar				
2000	Malabadal		Raj Mukherjee	Bengali	
2006	The Namesake	Ashoke's Mother		English	(final film role)

=== As a playback singer ===
Year	Title
1958	Lukochuri
1963	Barnali
1963	Polatak
1961	Tin Konya
1966	Joradighir Chowdhury Paribar
1967	Antony Firingee
1968	Baghini
1970	Bakso Badal
1974	Jodi Jantem
1976	Mera Dharam Meri Maa
1982	Amrita Kumbher Sandhane

== Awards ==
- BFJA Awards (1964) for Best Actress in supporting role – Palatak
- IFFI Best Actor Award (Female) (1965) for "Nirjan Saikate" at 3rd IFFI

== See also ==
- List of notable Calcuttans
