= Mamta (1952 film) =

- Theatrical poster of the film
- Directed by: Gunjal
- Written by: Kabil Amrutsari
- Screenplay by: Gunjal
- Story by: Chaturbhuj Doshi
- Produced by: J. L. Sharma; R. B. Haldia
- Starring: Sumitra Devi; Paro Devi; Ulhas; Kamal Mehra; Rajen Haksar; Ramesh
- Cinematography: L. C. Kapoor
- Edited by: Baburao Barodekar
- Music by: Sonik; Hansraj Behl
- Release date: 1952
- Country: India
- Language: Hindi

Mamta is a 1952 Bollywood film directed by Dada Gunjal. It was produced by J. L. Sharma and R. D. Haldia. L. C. Kapoor was the cinematographer of the film. The story of the film was written by Chaturbhuj Doshi, while the dialogues were written by Kabil Amrutsari. It stars Sumitra Devi as the protagonist.

Most of the songs of the film were composed by Sonik, with lyrics penned by Shyam Hindi, Verma Malik, Shevan Rizvi and Moti B. A. The film created ripples in media due to its theme of single motherhood and failed to impress at the box office.

== Plot ==
Vanmala nourishes an unrequited love for Vinod who harbours an unspoken love for his friend Aruna, mistakenly believing that she feels the same about him, while Aruna is in love with Arvind, a poet who lives on the outskirts of the town.

The parents of Vinod and Aruna, unperceptive of the intricacies of their children's feelings, decide to settle their engagement which is announced at Aruna's birthday party, where Arvind is also present. The announcement hurts Arvind's feelings, leading him to walk out of the party. Aruna runs after him to convince him that she was unaware of the engagement. Unbeknownst to Aruna's parents, she marries him in a nearby temple. When Vinod discovers the marriage between Arvind and Aruna, he feels devastated. However, on Aruna's insistence he marries Vanmala, resulting in a dissatisfactory conjugal life.

Arvind's career takes off, and he is invited to the All India Maha Kavi-Sammelan in Delhi, where he wins the title of "Maha-Kavi." Unfortunately, on his way back home, Arvind dies in a train accident. Afterwards, Aruna gives birth to a baby boy, while Vanmala gives birth to a stillborn. Unbeknownst to them, Aruna's infant is swapped with Vanmala's stillborn, and the latter takes the baby to be her own son. When Aruna discovers the truth, it is too late to reclaim her child. However, she endeavours to win her child back.

== Cast ==
- Sumitra Devi as Aruna
- Ulhas
- Mirza Musharraf
- Rajan Haksar
- Kamal Mehra
- Chitralekha
- Bhagwandas
- Rajni
- Shantabai
- Sadiq
- Kaabil Amrutsari
- Baby Salma
- Master Raja
- G. P. Srivastava
- Paro Devi
- Ramesh
- Sheila

== Crew ==
| Designation | Name |
|---|---|
| Director | Gunjal |
| Producer | J. L. Sharma; R. B. Haldia |
| Writer | Chaturbhuj Doshi |
| Screenplay writer | Gunjal |
| Dialogue writer | Kabil Amrutsari |
| Music composer | Sonik; Hansraj Behl |
| Cinematographer | Reddy Brothers; L. C. Kapoor |
| Editor | Baburao Barodekar |
| Audiography | Shanti Swroop |
| Art director | Yusuf Dhala |

== Soundtrack ==
| Songs | Singers |
|---|---|
| "O Sitamgar Aasman Jau Kaha" | Mubarak Begum |
| "Sitaro Haso Na Meri Bebasi Par" | Geeta Dutt |
| "Ha Bhor Bhayi Ek Pari Gagan Se Utri" | Mukesh |
| "Sheeshe Me Do Tasvire" | Sulochana Kadam |
| "Tera Mera Mera Tera Pyar Ho Pyari" | Mohammad Rafi; Sulochana Kadam |
| "Teri Kali Kali Ankhiya Kanhaiya" | Geeta Dutt |
| "Mai Samajh Gayi" | Premlata; Mubarak Begum |
| "Roop Ki Rani Aaja" | Shyam Kumar |

== Reception ==
The film was critically applauded. Sumitra Devi was critically appreciated for her role. Filmzack wrote, "She manipulated all her magnificent characteristics to vivify her role; her calmness, her softness, pain and pang and all were infused into one." The film failed to achieve favour at the box office.
