= Sabyasachi (1977 film) =

1977 Bengali-language action thriller film by Pijush Basu

- Theatrical poster
- Directed by: Pijush Basu
- Written by: Sharatchandra Chattopadhyay
- Screenplay by: Pijush Bose
- Based on: Pather Dabi by Sharatchandra Chattopadhay
- Produced by: Asim Sarkar
- Starring: Uttam Kumar; Supriya Devi; Jayashree Kabir; Anil Chatterjee
- Cinematography: Bijoy Ghosh
- Edited by: Baidyanath Chatterjee
- Music by: Uttam Kumar, Nidan Bandhu Bannerjee
- Production company: Usha Films
- Distributed by: Chandimata Films Pvt Ltd
- Release date: 21 January 1977
- Running time: 145 minutes
- Country: India
- Language: Bengali

Sabyasachi is a 1977 Bengali language period political action thriller film directed by Pijush Basu. Based on the novel Pather Dabi written by Sarat Chandra Chattopadhyay, the film produced by Asim Sarkar under the banner of Usha Films. It stars Uttam Kumar in the titular role, alongside Supriya Devi, Bikash Roy, Kiran Lahiri and Tarun Kumar in lead roles. The soundtrack of the film was composed by Nidan Bandhu Banerjee and particularly Uttam Kumar himself, marking his second film as a composer after Kal Tumi Aleya (1966). Set in British India, it revolves around a freedom fighter as well as revolutionary Dr. Sabyasachi Mallick, arresting whom is very difficult for the police as he always escape through his presence of mind and jaw dropping disguises. When he comes to Burma to continue his foundation Pather Dabi against the British raj and the Burma police service hires DCP Nimai Roy from India to bring him down.

== Plot ==
The plot revolves around the activities of an absconding Bengali revolutionary Sabyasachi and India's freedom movement against the British rule. The protagonist Sabyasachi forms a secrete revolutionary organization Pather Dabi. He is extremely talented, highly educated, courageous and committed to his organisation. He meets Rose in a brothel and inspires her to come into the freedom struggle. Rose become Sumitra and takes active part to organise the movement. Several other revolutionaries join with them to lead an armed uprising. Sabyasachi also inspires Apuraba and Bharati, a Bengali couple. But there is a story of betrayal behind Sabyasachi to gain the leadership, love and power.

== Cast ==
- Uttam Kumar as Sabyasachi Mallick, founder of 'Pather Dabi'
- Supriya Devi as Sumitra / Rose
- Kiran Lahiri as Apurba
- Bikash Roy as Inspector Nimai Roy
- Anil Chatterjee as Brajendra
- Tarun Kumar as Kabi
- Sulata Chowdhury as Burmese servant
- Shambhu Bhattacharya as Police officer
- Nripati Chattopadhyay
- Haradhan Bandopadhyay
- Sujata Dutta as Nabatara
- Satya Bandyopadhyay
- Mantu Bandyopadhyay

== Music ==
Sabyasachi

Soundtrack album by Uttam Kumar, Nidan Bandhu Baneejee
- Released: 1977
- Recorded: 1976
- Studio: Usha Films
- Label: Angel Digital Pvt Ltd
- Producer: Ashim Sarkar

Uttam Kumar, Nidan Bandhu Baneejee chronology
Kal Tumi Aleya (1966)	Sabyasachi (1977)

All lyrics are written by Rabindranath Tagore, Kaji Najrul Islam, Dwijendralal Ray; all music is composed by Rabindranath Tagore, Kaji Najrul Islam, Dwijendralal Roy. Music scored and composed by Uttam Kumar and his childhood singing trainer Nidan Bannerjee.

Songs
No.	Title	Artist	Length
1.	"Jodi Tor Dak Sune"	Rabindranath Tagore
2.	"Karar Oi Louha Kopat"	Kaji Najrul Islam
3.	"Banga Amar Janoni Amar"	Dwijendralal Roy
