= Nader Nimai =

Nader Nemai
- Directed by: Bimal Roy
- Based on: Chaitanya Mahaprabhu
- Starring: Ashim Kumar; Jahar Ray; Chhabi Biswas; Gurudas Bannerjee; Sobha Sen; Nitish Mukherjee; Tulsi Chakraborty; Satya Bannerjee
- Music by: Rathin Ghosh
- Distributed by: Angel Video
- Release date: 1960
- Running time: 80 min
- Country: India
- Language: Bengali

Nader Nimai is an Indian film based on the life of Chaitanya Mahaprabhu. This film was directed by Sri Bimal Roy and was released in 1960 in Bengali language. This film is on the life of Chaitanya Mahaprabhu in Nabadwip.

The second film is Nilachale Mahaprabhu which is nader nimai 2 starring the same actor, ashim kumar.

== Cast ==
- Asim Kumar as Chaitanya Mahaprabhu
- Chhabi Biswas
- Jahar Roy
- Gurudas Banerjee
- Jahar Ganguly
- Shyam Laha
- Moni Shrimani
- Satya Banerjee
- Tulsi Chakraborty
- Renuka Roy
- Sabita Basu
- Shobha Sen
