= Debi Chowdhurani (1949 film) =

- Poster of the film
- Directed by: Satish Dasgupta
- Screenplay by: Prafulla Ray
- Based on: Devi Chaudhurani
- Starring: Sumitra Devi; Pradip Kumar; Chhabi Biswas; Tulsi Chakraborty
- Cinematography: Sailen Bose
- Edited by: Binoy Bandyopadhyay
- Music by: Kalipada Sen
- Production company: Rupayan Chitra Pratisthan
- Distributed by: Moviesthan Limited
- Release date: 29 April 1949
- Country: India
- Language: Bengali

Debi Chowdhurani is a Bengali historical drama film directed by Satish Dasgupta based on Bankim Chandra Chattopadhyay's 1884 novel Devi Chaudhurani. It is the first cinematic adaptation of the classic novel, which was later adapted into another Bengali film Devi Chowdhurani in 1974 directed by Dinen Gupta. The film was released on 29 April 1949 under the banner of Rupayan Chitra Pratisthan.

== Plot ==
Prafulla, a young woman who is abandoned by her in law's family, meets a revolutionary leader Bhabani Pathak. Under his guidance, she is transformed as Devi Chowdhurani, who leads resistance against oppressive landlords and British Government.

== Cast ==
- Sumitra Devi as Prafulla a.k.a. Debi Chowdhurani
- Pradeep Kumar as Brajeshwar
- Chhabi Biswas
- Tulsi Chakraborty
- Nripati Chattopadhyay
- Nitish Mukhopadhyay
- Utpal Sen
- Reba Bose
- Nibhanani Devi
- Phani Ray
- Swagata Chakraborty
- Manorama Devi
- Prabha Devi
