= Kinu Gowalar Gali =

1964 Indian Bengali film

- Directed by: O. C. Gangopadhyay
- Screenplay by: O. C. Gangopadhyay
- Based on: Kinu Gowalar Gali by Santosh Kumar Ghosh
- Produced by: K. G. Productions
- Starring: Sumitra Devi; Kali Banerjee; Sharmila Tagore; Soumitra Chatterjee; Pahari Sanyal; Jahor Roy
- Edited by: Ardhendu Chattopadhyay
- Production company: K. G. Productions
- Distributed by: Mega Pictures
- Release date: 15 May 1964
- Country: India
- Language: Bengali

Kinu Gowalar Gali is an Indian Bengali drama film directed by O. C. Gangopadhyay and produced by Kamal Ghosh. Based on the novel Kinu Gowalar Gali by Santosh Kumar Ghosh, the plot follows an obsessed dramatist who dramatises the alleged adultery of his prepossessing wife. It stars Sumitra Devi and Kali Banerjee in the lead, alongside Sharmila Tagore, Soumitra Chatterjee, Pahari Sanyal and Jahor Roy in pivotal roles. The film received critical favour. Sumitra Devi received rave review for her performance in the film.

== Plot ==
The film revolves with the life and struggles of the residents of a narrow lane in Kolkata.

== Cast ==
- Sumitra Devi as Shanti
- Kali Banerjee as Moni
- Soumitra Chatterjee as Indrajit
- Sharmila Tagore as Neela
- Pahari Sanyal as Shibabrata
- Jahor Roy as Pramath Poddar
- Gita Dey as Amita
- Ruma Guha Thakurta (Cameo) as Chameli
- Jiben Bose
- Rabin Majumdar
- Nani Majumdar
- Prasanta Kumar
