= Calcutta Youth Choir =

Indian performance group

Calcutta Youth Choir (Bengali: ক্যালকাটা ইয়ুথ কয়্যার) was founded in 1958 by Ruma Guha Thakurta with Salil Chowdhury and Satyajit Ray.

Calcutta Youth Choir is known for their performance of folk and mass songs. Several years ago, the choir broke out with the song 'Aaj joto juddhabaaj'. Shibdas Bandopadhyay wrote the words and V. Balsara composed the music. Under the direction of Ruma Guha Thakurta, the choir performed songs by Dwijendralal Ray, Rabindranath Tagore, Rajanikanta Sen, Nazrul Islam, Prem Dhawan, Sudhin Dasgupta, Salil Chowdhury and Sibdas Banerjee.

== History ==
In July 1974, a 20-member folk song and dance troupe of Calcutta Youth Choir, led by Ruma Guha Thakurta, won the first prize in the Copenhagen Youth Festival. In 1998, the choir took part in the 25th anniversary of Independence Day of India in Delhi. The opening song was sung by Calcutta Youth Choir to welcome Nelson Mandela to India in 1990. The choir honoured Amartya Sen for winning the Nobel prize in 1998. It also performed to celebrate the 30 years of the Communist Party of India (Marxist) in West Bengal. More than 5000 shows have been performed by the choir led by Ruma Guha Thakurta. There are more than 300 members in the choir involved in various activities, including singing, dancing, playing musical instruments, management, among others. On 3 December 1994, the Calcutta Youth Choir celebrated its 36th anniversary to celebrate 50 years of Ruma Guha Thakurta's association with music, dance and cinema where sitting chief minister of West Bengal Jyoti Basu, Bijoya Ray (wife of Late Satyajit Ray), Buddhadeb Bhattacharya, singer Usha Uthup, Amit Kumar and many others were present. In spite of her major heart attack in 2004, Ruma Guhathakurta is still regularly performing. This is the only leading choir troupe of Calcutta performing continuously for the last 55 years.

Former chief minister of West Bengal, Buddhadeb Bhattacharya, inaugurated the new building of the choir in South Calcutta on 29 December 2006.

On 2 May 2008, the birthday of Satyajit Ray, Calcutta Youth Choir celebrated its 50th anniversary at Rabindrasadan, Kolkata in the presence of Manna Dey, sitting speaker of Parliament Somnath Chatterjee, Sabita Chowdhury, Mayor of Kolkata Bikash Ranjan Bhattacharya, Suchitra Mitra, and others. Manna Dey and Sabita Chowdhury participated in the song Janeywaleey Sipahi under the direction of Ruma Guha Thakurta.

On 16 September 2010, the choir celebrated its 52nd anniversary where 6 members of Calcutta Youth Choir were honoured for performing regularly with the choir for more than 50 years by Ruma Guha Thakurta.

On 9 April 2012, the Calcutta Youth Choir, led by Ruma Guha Thakurta, celebrated its 54th anniversary. This was the last show Guha Thakurta was present and conducted the show.

On 11 June 2013, the choir celebrated the 55th anniversary of the Calcutta Youth Choir. For the first time Ruma Guha Thakurta was not present in the Annual Show due to her deteriorating health condition.

On 27 January 2013, the choir hosted a Dance and Music Festival held at the Uttarpara Jaikrishna Ground. This event showcased Bengali music, accompanied with folk dance. On 5 May 2013, the choir performed a collection of patriotic songs at the Gitanjali Stadium. On 23 January 2014, the choir made their next appearance at the Mother Teresa International Award Ceremony and performed various folk songs to keep the audience and dignitaries entertained. In May 2014, they also performed hit numbers at Pete Seeger's Tribute Concert at the Tollygunge Club. On 4 July and 17 October 2014, the choir performed in St. James’ School and on both the occasions and performed their trademark folk and mass songs. On 8 January 2015, the choir performed at Bhantala High School and entertained the crowd with their music. On 12 September 2015, the Calcutta Youth choir performed at the Golden Jubilee Celebration of Naragole Raj College in Midnapur. In July 2016, the choir performed at Rabindra Sadan to celebrate the birth anniversary of D.L. Roy, Atul Prasad Sen and Rajani Ratan Sen. On 30 December 2016, the Calcutta Youth Choir performed in a Sangeet Anusthan held in the district of Hedua. The Calcutta Youth Choir has performed at the Bangla Sangeet Mela organised by the Govt. of West Bengal on several occasions: 9 April 2013, the choir participated in the Bangla Sangeet Mela held at the Rabitirtha Hall in Newtown. In February 2014, 17 February 2015 and 18 December 2016 the choir yet again performed at the historic Bangla Sangeet Mela organised by the Govt. of West Bengal and held at Rabindra Sadan. On 19 July 2015, the choir performed to celebrate the birth anniversary of D.L. Roy and Atul Prasad Sen at Rabindra Sadan.

== Albums by Calcutta Youth Choir ==
1. Beje Uthlo Ki Somoyer Ghori, A collection of mass songs released by His Master's Voice in 1976
2. Waqt Ki Awaz (Hindi), A collection of modern songs released by His Master's Voice
3. Prarthna Sangeet, A collection of devotional songs released by CBS
4. All times Great Calcutta Youth Choir, A collection of selected track from His Master's Voice
5. Amra Tori Beye Jai, A collection of mass songs released by His Master's Voice in 1981
6. Manusher Gaan Gai, A collection of mass songs released by His Master's Voice in 1982
7. Pochis Bochor Dhore, Released by His Master's Voice in the year 1983 on 25th anniversary of the choir
8. Bharatbarsho Surger Ek Naam, A collection of Bengali modern songs released by His Master's Voice
9. Swadesi Juger Gaan, a collection of patriotic songs released by His Master's Voice
10. Chetonar Gaan, A collection of songs to welcome Nelson Mandela in India, released by CBS in 1988
11. Besh Sotoker Gaan, A collection of Bengali mass songs released by Hindustan Records in 1990 celebrating 300th birthday of Calcutta
12. Deshatobodok Gaan, A collection of patriotic songs released by Gathani in 1993
13. Din Agato Oi, A collection of modern songs released by Gathani in 1994 for the celebration of Bengali New Year (1400 SATABDI)
14. Kadam Kadam Badaye Ja (Hindi), A collection of INA (Azad Hind Fauj) songs by His Master's Voice for the 100th birth anniversary of Netaji Subhas Bose in 1996
15. Mile Sobe Bharat Santan, A collection of modern songs released by His Master's Voice in 1998
16. Sikol Bhangar Gaan, a collection of pre-independence patriotic songs, released in 2001
17. Amader Salilda, A collection of mass songs by Salil Chowdhury released by ASHA AUDIO in 2007
18. Ek Dor Mein, A collection of Hindi Translation Rabindra Sangeet released by Saregama (formerly His Master's Voice) in 2010
