= Joradighir Chowdhury Paribar =

1966 Indian Bengali film

- Directed by: Ajit Lahiri
- Screenplay by: Mrinal Sen
- Story by: Pramathanath Bishi
- Produced by: Sunil Ram
- Starring: Soumitra Chatterjee; Madhabi Mukherjee; Asit Baran; Bhanu Bandyopadhyay; Tarun Kumar; Bikash Roy; Kali Banerjee; Sabitri Chatterjee; Ruma Guha Thakurta
- Cinematography: Bijoy De
- Edited by: Govinda Chatterjee
- Music by: Kalipada Sen
- Distributed by: Shadow Productions
- Release date: 9 December 1966
- Country: India
- Language: Bengali

Joradighir Chowdhury Paribar is a 1966 Indian Bengali romance drama film directed by Ajit Lahiri and produced by Sunil Ram under the banner of Shadow Productions. It stars Soumitra Chatterjee, Madhabi Mukherjee, Asit Baran, Bhanu Bandyopadhyay, Tarun Kumar, and Bikash Roy in the lead roles.

== Plot ==
Chhote, a rich man from a family of landlords, is betrothed to Indrani but is forced to marry Banamala to save her from the clutches of Parantap. Soon after, Pranatap marries Indrani to exact revenge.

== Cast ==
- Soumitra Chatterjee
- Madhabi Mukherjee
- Asit Baran
- Bhanu Bandyopadhyay
- Tarun Kumar
- Bikash Roy
- Kali Banerjee
- Nirmal Ghosh
- Sabitri Chatterjee
- Ruma Guha Thakurta
- Shekhar Chattopadhyay
- Satya Bandyopadhyay
- Dilip Roy (Guest appearance)
- Kamal Mitra (Guest appearance)
- Tarun Ray
- Geetali Roy
- Deepika Das (Guest appearance)
- Bharati Ray
- Prasad Mukhopadhyay
- Khagen Pathak
- Arun Ray
- Sudheer Sarkar
- Tinu Ghosh
- Arup Bakshi
- Bhabtosh
- Sundarlal
- Joynarayan Mukhopadhyay
- Subrata Sen
- Ardhendu Bhattacharya (Guest appearance)

== Music ==
This film music composed by Kalipada Sen.

== Awards ==
BFJA Awards (1967):-

- Best Actress Madhabi Mukherjee
