= Nilachaley Mahaprabhu =

1957 film by Kartik Chattopadhyay

- Directed by: Kartik Chattopadhyay
- Screenplay by: Nripendrakrishna Chattopadhyay; Bimal Mitra
- Story by: Nripendrakrishna Chattopadhyay
- Based on: Chaitanya Mahaprabhu
- Starring: Asim Kumar; Dipti Roy; Sumitra Devi; Chhabi Biswas; Ahindra Choudhury; Bhanu Bandyopadhyay; Kanu Banerjee; Nripati Chattopadhyay
- Cinematography: Amulya Mukhopadhyay
- Edited by: Haridas Mahalanobis
- Music by: Rai Chand Boral; Pranab Ray (lyrics); Baishnab Mahalanabis (lyrics)
- Production company: Udoy Chitra Pratisthan
- Distributed by: Movie Maya Pvt. Ltd.
- Release date: 28 June 1957 (India)
- Country: India
- Language: Bengali

Nilachaley Mahaprabhu was a 1957 Indian Bengali biographical film directed by Kartik Chattopadhyay, based on the life of 15th-century mystic Chaitanya Mahaprabhu, who started his spiritual journey and Hindu reform movement, part of the Bhakti movement during his years at Nilachal, the shrine of Jagannath at Puri. It stars Asim Kumar in the title role with Dipti Roy, Sumitra Devi, Ahindra Choudhury, Bhanu Bandyopadhyay, Nripati Chattopadhyay and Chhabi Biswas in supporting roles.

At the beginning of his career, a 20-year-old Soumitra Chatterjee was rejected in his screen test for the film by director Kartik Chattopadhyay, he later made his debut with Apur Sansar (1959). The film continues to be a popular amongst Chaitanya and Krishna devotees and ISKCON followers. The first film of Chaitanya Mahaprabhu is Nader Nimai followed by this film.

== Cast ==
- Asim Kumar as Chaitanya
- Dipti Roy as Vishnupriya
- Ahindra Choudhury
- Dhiraj Bhattacharya
- Nitish Mukhapadhyay
- Kanu Banerjee
- Gurudas Bandyopadhyay
- Bhanu Bandopadhyay
- Nripati Chattopadhyay
- Chhabi Biswas
- Sumitra Devi
- Molina Devi
- Padma Devi
- Shikharani
- Sumita Bandha
- Gyanada Kakati
- Suruchi Sengupta
- Kumari Indrani
