= Sabyasachi (1948 film) =

1948 Indian film directed by Sarat Chandra Chattopadhyay

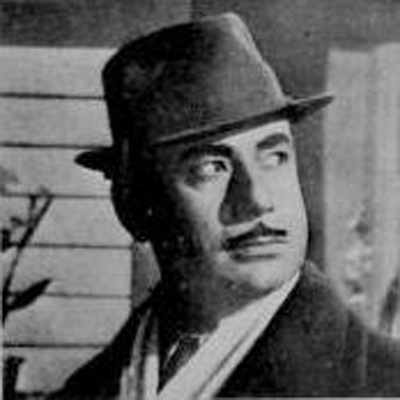
- Kamal Mitra as Sabyasachi
- Directed by: Agradoot
- Story by: Sarat Chandra Chattopadhyay
- Based on: Pather Dabi by Sarat Chandra Chattopadhyay
- Starring: Kamal Mitra; Sandhyarani; Bipin Gupta
- Cinematography: Bibhuti Laha
- Music by: Robin Chatterjee
- Production company: Associated Pictures
- Release date: 1948
- Country: India
- Language: Hindi

Sabyasachi is a Hindi action drama film directed by Agradoot based on Sarat Chandra Chattopadhyay's 1926 novel Pather Dabi. The film was released in 1948 under the banner of Associated Pictures. This film was released as the Hindi version of 1947 Bengali film Pather Dabi.

== Plot ==
The film is set against the backdrop of the Indian independence movement. Doctor Sabyasachi is a dauntless and charismatic revolutionary, whose dream is to create an armed uprising to overthrow British rule in India. He founded a secret revolutionary organization, Pather Dabi.

== Cast ==
- Kamal Mitra as Sabyasachi
- Sandhyarani as Bharati
- Bipin Gupta as Talwarkar
- Meera Mishra as Sumitra
- Paresh Banerjee as Apurba
- Manorama Devi
