= Bibriti Chatterjee =

Indian actress

- Born: 16 November; Kolkata, West Bengal, India
- Occupation: Actress
- Years active: 2016–present

Bibriti Chatterjee is an Indian actress and model who works predominantly in Bengali films.

== Early life ==
Bibriti Chatterjee was born in Kolkata, West Bengal. She did her primary education in Kolkata and then attended high school at a boarding school in Rajasthan.

== Career ==
She debuted in the Bengali cinema with the film Byomkesh Gotro (2018). This was followed by two seasons of the comedy webseries Oh! Mother (2018), where she played the role of Diya, which was well received. She then starred in the critically acclaimed Ebhabei Golpo Hok (2020). The film won the 2021 Dada Saheb Palke Award. Her next release Bhotbhoti (2022) received unfavourable reviews. However, her performance was applauded.

== Filmography ==
Year	Title	Role	Language	Ref
2018	Byomkesh Gotro	Meera	Bengali	
2020	Ebhabei Golpo Hok	Laboni	Bengali	
2022	Bhotbhoti	Rita Mahato	Bengali	
2025	Devi Chowdhurani: Bandit Queen of Bengal	Nishi	Bengali	
TBA	Miss Khan Ab toh Hans Do		Hindi	
TBA	Gaki		Bengali	
TBA	Golpe Mora Chupkotha		Bengali	

== Web series ==
Year	Title	Role	Platform	Language	Notes	Ref.
2018	Oh! Mother	Diya	Addatimes	Bengali	Season 1,2	
2021	Hai Tauba	Tania	ALTBalaji	Hindi	Season 2	
2022	Byadh	Mrinalini Gomes	Hoichoi	Bengali	Season 1	
TBA	Avni Sen's No. 7 Case					

== Television ==
Year	Title	Role	Channel	Language	Ref.
2015-2016	Bhule Jeo Na Please		Colors Bangla	Bengali	
2016	Goyenda Ginni	Deepa	Zee Bangla	Bengali	
2017	Prem Ya Paheli – Chandrakanta	Aiyyara Chapla	Life Ok	Hindi	
