= Mashaal (1950 film) =

Mashaal / Samar
- Directed by: Nitin Bose
- Based on: Rajni (1877) by Bankimchandra Chattopadhyay
- Produced by: Bombay Talkies
- Starring: Ashok Kumar; Sumitra Devi
- Music by: S. D. Burman; Manna Dey
- Release dates: 5 August 1950 (Hindi); 6 October 1950 (Bengali)
- Country: India
- Language: Hindi / Bengali

Mashaal / Samar is a 1950 Indian bilingual Hindi- / Bengali-language film directed by Nitin Bose. The film is based on Bankimchandra Chattopadhyay's novel Rajni (1877). It features Ashok Kumar and Sumitra Devi in lead roles. It is the first bilingual film, which was shot in Hindi and Bengali languages.

Mashaal established the careers of its music directors S. D. Burman and Manna Dey. A reviewer for Thought praised the film and commented, "If Bombay Talkies retrieved their fast fading reputation with Mahal, it might equally well be said that they have re-established it with Mashal."

== Plot ==
The film is a romance drama centered around property rights and personal vengeance. Childhood lovers Samar (Ashok Kumar) and Tarangini (Sumitra Devi) are separated when Tarangini obeys her father and marries a wealthy zamindar (landlord). After achieving success as a lawyer, a bitter Samar plots revenge. He marries a blind flower-girl, only to discover a massive twist—she is the actual legal owner of the property that funds the zamindar's fortune. The narrative thickens because the blind flower-girl is actually in love with Jatin, who happens to be the zamindar's son.

== Cast ==
- Ashok Kumar as Samar
- Sumitra Devi as Tarangini
- Ruma Ganguly
- Kanu Roy
- Moni Chatterjee
- Krishnakant
