= Kali Banerjee =

Indian actor

- Born: Kaliprasad Banerjee; 20 November 1921; Calcutta, Bengal Presidency, British India
- Died: 5 July 1993 (aged 71); Lucknow, Uttar Pradesh, India
- Occupation: Actor
- Years active: 1940–1993

Kaliprasad Banerjee (20 November 1921 – 5 July 1993), professionally known as Kali Banerjee was an Indian actor, who worked in the 1950s–1970s in Bengali cinema. He is best known for his work with film directors like Satyajit Ray in Parash Pathar (1958) and Ritwik Ghatak in Nagarik (1952) and Ajantrik (1958).

== Career ==
Starring in many commercial ventures in the 1960s, his association with the serious film-makers is what has given the actor an imperishable place in the history of Bengali cinema. He starred first in the movie named 'Tatinir Bichar' and 'Barmar Pathe.' Further he brought out a convincing portrayal of a young Chinese vendor Lu Wang in the street of Kolkata in time of India's freedom struggle in Mrinal Sen's Neel Akasher Neechey (1959).

He acted in Satyajit Ray's Parash Pathar (1958) and Teen Kanya (1961), but it was his association with Ritwik Ghatak, with whom he worked in Nagarik (1952), Ajantrik (1958) that the cinephiles mostly enjoy and want to commemorate.

He played a Bahurupi in Bari Theke Paliye. Then there was Ajantrik, where he was flawless in the portrayal of an idiosyncratic driver Bimal who is in love with his car. Besides these Arthouse films, he acted with aplomb in the films such as Kabuliwala (1957), Badsha, Kinu Gowalar Goli, Gurudakshina and the Hindi films such as Bawarchi (1972) directed by Hrishikesh Mukherjee.

He acted as the leading character 'Totla Ganesh' (stammering Ganesh) in Satyen Bose's popular hit comedy Barjatri (1951) (English title: The Marriage Procession). The Bengali movie-goer fondly remembers his understated comedy and excellent comic timing in the film. After that he worked in hundreds of Bengali commercial movies. Important side roles played by Banerjee in all those movies made him very popular in Tollywood (Bengali film industry).

== Selected filmography ==
- Tatinir Bichar (1940)
- Burmar Pathey (1947)
- Putul Nacher Itikatha (1949)
- Tathapi (1950)
- Barjatri (1951) - Gansha
- Ratnadip (1951)
- Nagarik (1952) - The Father
- Rani Bhabani (1952)
- Abu Hossain (1952)
- Anibarya (1952)
- Pathik (1953)
- Nabin Jatra (1953)
- Nababidhan (1954)
- Ankush (1954)
- Rickshaw-Wala (1955)
- Sabar Upare (1955) - Inspector Shushil
- Kalindi (1955)
- Debi Malini (1955)
- Raat Bhore (1955)
- Tonsil (1956)
- Aparajito (1956) - Kathak
- Shilpi (1956)
- Sinthir Sindur (1956)
- Khela Bhangar Khela (1957)
- Surer Parashey (1957)
- Kabuliwala (1957)
- Ogo Shunchho (1957)
- Ami Baro Habo (1957)
- Ratri Sheshe (1957)
- Raat Ekta (1957)
- Louhakapat (1958)
- Dakharkra (1958)
- Parash Pathar (1958) - Priyotosh Henry Biswas
- Ajantrik (1958) - Bimal
- Bari Theke Paliye (1958) - Haridas
- Nagini Kanyar Kahini (1958)
- Suryatoran (1958)
- Rajdhani Theke (1958)
- Janmantar (1959)
- Neel Akasher Neechey (1959) - Wang Lu
- Sonar Harin (1959)
- Agnisambhaba (1959)
- Dui Bechara (1960)
- Prabesh Nishedh (1960)
- Natun Fasal (1960)
- Shesh Paryanta (1960)
- Kshudha (1960)
- Teen Kanya (1961) - Phanibhushan Saha (segment "Monihara")
- Pankatilak (1961)
- Punashcha (1961)
- Carey Saheber Munshi (1961)
- Aamar Desh (1962)
- Hansuli Banker Upakatha (1962) - Banwari
- Shubho Drishti (1962)
- Ektukro Agun (1963)
- Akash Pradeep (1963)
- Tridhara (1963) - Chhoto-Bapi
- Badsha (1963 film) (1963)
- Saptarshi (1964)
- Kinu Gowalar Gali (1964) - Moni
- Kantatar (1964)
- Aarohi (1964) - Peasant Who Learns to Read
- Dui Parba (1964)
- Subha O Debatar Gras (1964)
- Surer Agun (1965)
- Dinanter Alo (1965)
- Joradighir Chowdhury Paribar (1966)
- Seba (1967)
- Hangsa Mithun (1968)
- Raktarekha (1968)
- Boudi (1968)
- Jiban Sangeet (1968)
- Kakhano Megh (1968)
- Pratidan (1969)
- Shasti (1970)
- Aleyar Alo (1970)
- Muktisnan (1970)
- Rupasi (1970) - Ekkari - Thakurda
- Janani (1971)
- Nimantran (1971)
- Atattar Din Pare (1971)
- Maa O Mati (1972)
- Ajker Nayak (1972)
- Bawarchi (1972) - Kashinath Sharma
- Andha Atit (1972)
- Bigalita Karuna Janhabi Jamuna (1972) - Dr. Sarkar
- Agnibhramar (1973)
- Aabirey Rangano (1973)
- Prantarekha (1974)
- Sangini (1974)
- Debi Chowdhurani (1974) - Haraballav
- Shanginee (1974)
- Umno O Jhumno (1975)
- Natun Surya (1975)
- Sansar Simante (1975)
- Swayamsiddha (1975)
- Khudha (1975)
- Swikarakti (1976)
- Harmonium (1976) - Harendra Kumar Chatterjee
- Hangsaraj (1976)
- Dampati (1976)
- Yugo Manab Kabir (1976)
- Sandhya Surya (1976)
- Ek Bindu Sukh (1977)
- Ek Je Chhilo Desh (1977)
- Behula Lakhindar (1977)
- Ei Prithibir Panthanibas (1977)
- Pratima (1977)
- Joy Maa Tara (1978) - Nabab
- Tushar Tirtha Amarnath (1978)
- Debdas (1979)
- Ghatkali (1979)
- Sunayani (1979)
- Nouka Dubi (1979)
- Nandan (1979)
- Shesh Bichar (1980)
- Batasi (1980)
- Bichar (1980)
- Dadar Kirti (1980) - Saraswati's father
- Meghmukti (1981)
- Manikchand (1981) - Barda
- Durga Durgatinashini (1982)
- Preyasi (1982)
- Rajbadhu (1982)
- Matir Swarga (1982)
- Maa Bhabani Maa Amar (1982)
- Chhoto Maa (1983)
- Nishibhor (1983)
- Jabanbondi (1983)
- Arpita (1983)
- Indira (1983 film)
- Agamikal (1983)
- Mouchor (1983)
- Dadamoni (1984)
- Simantarag (1984)
- Ahuti (1984)
- Pratigya (1985)
- Sonar Sansar (1985)
- Mutkapran (1986)
- Urbashi (1986)
- Parinati (1986)
- Subho Kamon Aachho? (1986)
- Bouma (1986)
- Prem Bandhan (1986)
- Lalan Fakir (1987)
- Debika (1987)
- Gurudakshina (1987)
- Chhoto Bou (1988)
- Debibaran (1988)
- Anjali (1988)
- Parashmoni (1988)
- Nayanmoni (1989)
- Mangaldeep (1989)
- Shatarupa (1989)
- Sati (1989)
- Kari Diye Kinlam (1989)
- Jaa Devi Sarva Bhuteshu (1989)
- Byabadhan (1990)
- Debata (1990)
- Mahajan (1990)
- Jibansangee (1990)
- Heerak Jayanti (1990)
- Ahankar (1991)
- Abhagini (1991)
- Sadharan Meye (1991)
- Bidhilipi (1991)
- Nyaychakra (1991)
- Purushottam (1992)
- Ananda (1992)
- Shaitan (1992)
- Shraddhanjali (1993)
- Arjun (1993)
- Phire Paoa (1993)
- Ami O Maa (1994)
- Salma Sundari (1994)
- Mejo Bou (1995)
- Abirbhab (1995)
- Boumoni (1995)
- Patibrata (1995)
- Hingsa (1998)
- Chhoto Saheb (2000)
- Tantrik (2002)
