= Suleh (film) =

- Directed by: Apurba Kumar Mitra
- Based on: Sandhi (1944)
- Produced by: Chitrarupa Ltd.
- Starring: Ahindra Choudhury; Biman Banerjee; Mrinal Kanti Ghosh; Manorama
- Release date: 1946
- Country: India
- Language: Hindi

Suleh is a 1946 Hindi film directed by Apurba Kumar Mitra.

== Plot ==
Dinanath, a blind village actor, wants his lawyer son Suresh to marry Vani, his friend Janardan’s daughter. Suresh initially refuses Roy Bahadur’s offer to marry his petulant daughter Rekha for money. After overhearing that his father’s property is mortgaged to Navin Chakraborty for Suresh’s education, Suresh marries Rekha to repay the debt. Dinanath, unaware of the reason, disowns him when he learns of the marriage. Janardan dies in an accident during their return home, increasing Dinanath’s anger. Later, Dinanath works to fund Vani’s marriage and fights fellow actor Prankesto, who files a false attempted-murder case against him. In court, Suresh defends and acquits his father, but Dinanath still rejects him. Rekha then intervenes and reconciles father and son, restoring family peace.

== Cast ==
- Ahindra Choudhury as Dinanath
- Biman Banerjee as Suresh
- Mrinal Kanti Ghosh
- Manorama as Vani
- Devbala
- Bipin Gupta
- Tulsi Chakraborty
- Hiralal
