= Byadh =

Bengali web series

Byadh (The Hunter) is a Bengali crime thriller streaming television series directed by Abhirup Ghosh and based on Rajarshi Das Bhowmick's story Chorai Hatya Rohoshya. It was released on Hoichoi OTT platform on 11 February 2022 under the banner of Zeoline Media production. It stars Anirban Chakraborty, Rajatava Dutta and Kharaj Mukherjee in pivotal roles.

== Plot ==
The series begins when an unnamed mysterious man is brutally killing sparrows in different villages of West Bengal. Police commissioner sends the case to the Department of unusual cases. This department deals with worthless issues which are considered to be unimportant by the police. Experienced officer Kanaicharan and newcomer Souvik are investigating the cases. Both get deeply involved in the matter and the cat and mouse game begins. It reveals that someone is killing sparrows following the ideology of Four Pests campaign.

== Cast ==
- Rajatava Dutta as Kanaicharan Das
- Anirban Chakraborty as Bishu
- Kharaj Mukherjee as Bhanu Samaddar
- Anashua Majumdar as Tanima Sen, Ornithologist
- Souman Bose as Souvik
- Bibriti Chatterjee as Mrinalini Gomes

== Episodes ==
Series	Episodes	Originally released
1	6	11 February 2022

=== Season 1 (2021) ===
No. overall	Episode	Directed by	Original release date
1	Department of Unusual Cases	Abhirup Ghosh	11 February 2022
2	Fall of a Sparrow	Abhirup Ghosh	11 February 2022
3	The Killing Ground	Abhirup Ghosh	11 February 2022
4	The Bait	Abhirup Ghosh	11 February 2022
5	The Hunter and the Hunted	Abhirup Ghosh	11 February 2022
6	The Revolution	Abhirup Ghosh	11 February 2022
