= Krishna Leela (1946 film) =

- Directed by: Debaki Kumar Bose
- Starring: Paresh Banerjee; Devi Mukherjee; Kanan Devi; Kamal Mitra
- Cinematography: Ajoy Kar
- Release date: 1946
- Country: India
- Language: Hindi

Krishna Leela is a 1946 Bollywood film directed by Debaki Kumar Bose. It stars Paresh Banerjee and Kanan Devi in the lead.
