= Manorama (Hindi actress) =

Indian actress (1926–2008)

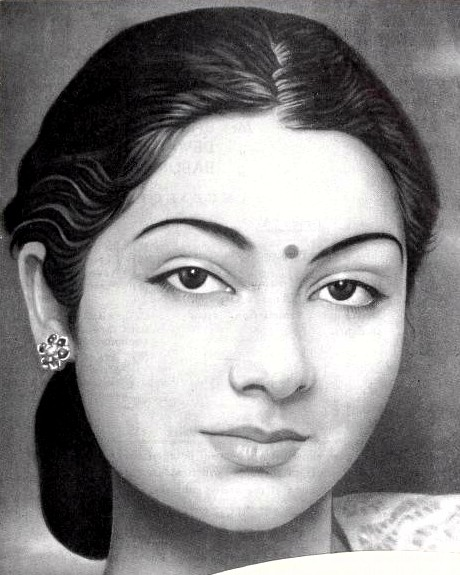
- Manorama in 1943
- Born: Erin Isaac Daniels; 16 August 1926; Lahore, Punjab, British India
- Died: 15 February 2008 (aged 81); Mumbai, Maharashtra, India
- Occupation: Actress
- Years active: 1936–2005
- Spouse: Rajan Haksar (divorced)
- Children: Rita Haksar

Manorama (born Erin Isaac Daniels; 16 August 1926 – 15 February 2008) was an Indian character actress in Bollywood known best for her role as the comical tyrant aunt in Seeta Aur Geeta (1972) and in films such as Ek Phool Do Maali (1969) and Do Kaliyaan (1968). She started her career as a child artiste in 1936 in Lahore, under the name Baby Iris. Thereafter, she made her debut as an adult in 1941, and had her final role in Water in 2005, her career extending over 60 years. Through her career she acted in over 160 films. After playing heroine roles in the early 1940s, she settled into playing villainous or comic roles. She played comic roles in superhit films such as Half Ticket appearing alongside Kishore Kumar and Madhubala. She gave memorable performances in Dus Lakh, Jhanak Jhanak Payal Baaje, Mujhe Jeene Do, Mehboob ki Menhdi, Caravan, Bombay to Goa and Lawaris.

== Biography ==
She acted in films since 1941 under her stage name Manorama. Her real name was Erin Issac Daniels. She had an Irish mother and an Indian Christian father, who was a professor in an engineering college. A trained classical singer and dancer, she used to do stage shows for the Red Cross in the 1940s in Lahore. At the age of nine, she was spotted by Roop K. Shorey in a school concert in Lahore. She started off as a child artist in Khazanchi (1941), under the screen name Manorama (given by Shorey), and grew into a very successful and high-paid actress of Lahore. After partition she shifted to Mumbai. Actor Chandramohan recommended her to producers. Although she acted in the superhit Punjabi film Lachchi, she was relegated to play Dilip Kumar's sister in Ghar ki Izzat (1948). After her marriage to actor Rajan Haksar, she was slotted into character roles and then to villainous or comedian roles. After several years of marriage, she got divorced. Her last Hindi movie was Akbar Khan's Haadsa (1983).

She switched to TV serials and shifted to Delhi for five years, where she worked in the series Dustak which also featured Shahrukh Khan. She shot for Mahesh Bhatt's Junoon (1992) too, but her role was snipped at the editing table. Around 2001, she worked with Balaji Telefilms for their serials Kashti and Kundali. She also played Hiten Tejwani's grandmother's role in the serial Kutumb.

Her last movie was Deepa Mehta's Water (2005), where she mesmerised Hollywood critics with her performance. According to her, she was the first and final choice to play Madhumati in the film. The production of the film was stopped in Varanasi, and five years later it was started again in Sri Lanka, the entire cast was changed except for her.

== Personal life ==
She was married to Rajan Haksar, also an actor. After the partition riots broke out in Lahore in 1947, she ran for safety to Mumbai. In Mumbai, actor Chander Mohan Wattal came to her help. Through Chander Mohan Wattal, she got introduced to Rajan Haksar. They fell in love and married. Rajan Haksar, who rose to popularity as character artist in Hindi cinema, belonged to a Kashmiri Pandit family from Gwalior.

Manorama suffered a stroke in 2007, though she recovered from it, she suffered from speech slurring and other complications. She died on 15 February 2008 in Charkop, Mumbai. She is survived by a daughter Rita Haksar. Rita did Suraj aur Chanda as heroine opposite Sanjeev Kumar, but later married an engineer and settled in the Dubai.

== Filmography ==
- Ik Musafir (1940) Punjabi Movie
- Khazanchi (1941)
- Sehti Murad on 24 January (1941) Punjabi Movie
- Mera Mahi (1941) punjabi movie
- Khandaan (1942)
- Koel (1944) as Taro in Punjabi Movie as a main heroine
- Sandhi (1944) as Vani
- Suleh (1946) as Vani
- Ghar Ki Izzat (1948) as Radhika
- Lachhi (1949) Punjabi movie
- Posti (1950) Punjabi movie
- Hanste Aansoo (1950)
- Jugni (1952) Punjabi Movie as Malti
- Parineeta (1953)
- Kundan (1955)
- Lajwanti (1958)
- Khazanchi (1958)
- Dulhan (1958)
- Santan (1959)
- Chacha Zindabad (1959)
- Fashionable Wife (1959)
- Gokul Ka Chor (1959)
- Patang (1960)
- Miya Bibi Razi (1960)
- Wanted (1961)
- Roop Ki Rani Choron Ka Raja (1961)
- Pyar Ki Pyas (1961)
- Shaadi (1962)
- Reporter Raju (1962)
- Ma Beta (1962)
- Half Ticket (1962)
- Mummy Daddy (1963)
- Mujhe Jeene Do (1963)
- Dil Hi To Hai (1963)
- Aap Ki Parchhaiyan (1964)
- Neela Aakash (1965)
- Namaste Ji (1965)
- Janwar (1965)
- Madras to Pondicherry (1966)
- Neend Hamari Khwab Tumhare (1966)
- Johar in Kashmir (1966)
- Dus Lakh (1966)
- Budtameez (1966)
- Mera Munna (1967)
- Baharon Ke Sapne (1967)
- Mere Huzoor (1968)
- Do Kaliyaan (1968)
- Ek Phool Do Maali (1969)
- Pavitra Paapi (1970)
- Mastana (1970)
- My Love (1970)
- Devi (1970)
- Mehboob Ki Mehndi (1971)
- Man Mandir (1971)
- Ladki Pasand Hai (1971)
- Johar Mehmood in Hong Kong (1971)
- Gambler (1971)
- Duniya Kya Jaane (1971)
- Caravan (1971)
- Bombay to Goa (1971)
- Gomti Ke Kinare (1972)
- Seeta Aur Geeta (1972)
- Shor (1972)
- Jeet (uncredited)(1972)
- Banarasi Babu (1972)
- Zehreela Insaan (1973)
- Naya Din Nai Raat (1974)
- International Crook (1974)
- Dulhan (1974)
- Sunehra Sansar (1975)
- Lafange (1975)
- Maha Chor (1976)
- Aadalat (1976)
- Gumrah (1976)
- Giddha (1976)
- Aaj Ka Mahaatma (1976)
- Hira Aur Patthar (1976)
- Saheb Bahadur (1977)
- Ladki Jawan Ho Gayi (1977)
- Charandas (1977)
- Laawaris (1981)
- Sahhas (1981)
- Katilon Ke Kaatil (1981)
- Meharbaani (1981)
- Dharam kaanta (1981)
- Dharam Kanta Munnibai (1982)
- Teri Maang Sitaron Se Bhar Doon (1982)
- Haadsa (1983)
- Main Awara Hoon (1983)
- Water (2005)
