= Sandhi (1944 film) =

1944 Indian film

- Poster of the film
- Directed by: Apurba Mitra
- Based on: Sandhi by Shailajananda Mukherjee
- Produced by: Chitrarupa Ltd.
- Starring: Ahindra Choudhury; Biman Banerjee; Sumitra Devi; Bipin Gupta
- Edited by: Rabin Das
- Music by: Anil Bagchi
- Release date: 26 October 1944
- Country: India
- Languages: Hindi; Bengali

Sandhi (transl. Reconciliation) is a 1944 Indian bilingual drama film directed by Apurba Mitra. Based on the Shailajananda Mukherjee's Bengali novel of the same name, the narrative follows Suresh, a young lawyer who marries Rekha, the ill-tempered daughter of a wealthy man, in exchange for a lump sum to repay his father Dinanath's debt. This infuriates Dinanath who disowns him. The film stars Ahindra Choudhury as Dinanath, Biman Banerjee as Suresh and Sumitra Devi as Rekha. The film marks the debut of Sumitra Devi, catapulting her to stardom. The film became a major financial success. The Bengali version received three BFJA Awards.

== Plot ==
Dinanath, a blind jatra actor, cherishes the wish that his son, Suresh, should marry Vani, the daughter of his neighbour and close friend, Janardan. Suresh, however, is a practising lawyer at the Calcutta High Court. One day, he inadvertently overhears a conversation between his father and Navin Chakraborty, and learns that Dinanath once borrowed a substantial sum of money to finance his college education—a debt that still remains unpaid. Motivated by a sense of obligation and ambition, Suresh agrees to a proposal from a wealthy gentleman, known as Roy Bahadur, to marry his beautiful yet ill-tempered daughter, Rekha, in exchange for a lump sum that he uses to pay his father's debt to Navin Chakraborty.

Consequently, he writes to Janardan, expressing his inability to marry Vani. This decision deeply disheartens Janardan and provokes Dinanath's intense anger. Determined to dissuade his son, Dinanath, accompanied by Janardan, travels to Calcutta. However, upon reaching Roy Bahadur's residence, they discover that Suresh has already married Rekha. Heartbroken and enraged, Dinanath renounces Suresh as his son and departs with Janardan. Tragically, on their journey home, Janardan dies in an accident, further intensifying Dinanath's resentment towards Suresh.

Thereafter, Dinanath resolves to arrange Vani's marriage into a respectable family and undertakes numerous acting assignments to accumulate the necessary funds. During this period, he becomes embroiled in a bitter feud with Prankesto, a fellow actor who harbours deep animosity towards him. In the course of a violent altercation, Prankesto strikes Dinanath, injuring his head. Subsequently, Prankesto files a formal complaint, alleging that Dinanath had attempted to murder him.

Dinanath is summoned to court, where he is astonished to find that Suresh is appearing as his legal counsel. Despite Suresh's successful defence and the favourable verdict, Dinanath steadfastly refuses to reconcile with him. However, on their way home, Dinanath and his wife, Rajlakshmi, are stopped by Rekha, who intervenes with sincerity and tact. Through her efforts, she succeeds in bringing about a reconciliation between father and son, restoring harmony within the family.

== Cast ==
- Ahindra Choudhury as Dinanath
- Biman Banerjee as Suresh
- Sumitra Devi as Rekha
- Manorama as Vani
- Devbala
- Ranjit Ray
- Phani Ray
- Sarat Chattopadhyay
- Bipin Gupta
- Pashupati Kundu
- Haridhan Mukhopadhyay
- Nripati Chattopadhyay

== Accolades ==
Year	Title	Category	Recipient	Result	Ref.
1944	BFJA Award	Best film		Won	
1944	BFJA Award	Best actress	Sumitra Devi	Won	
1944	BFJA Award	Best music director	Anil Bagchi	Won	

== Remake ==
Year	Title	Language	Director	Cast	Ref.
1946	Suleh	Hindi	Apurba Kumar Mitra	Ahindra Choudhury, Biman Banerjee	
1980	Sandhi	Bengali	Amal Dutta	Bikash Roy, Dipankar De, Mithu Mukherjee	

== Bibliography ==
- Rabi Basu (1996). Satrang (in Bengali). Vol. 1. Deep Prakashan.
