= Pather Dabi (film) =

1947 Indian film

- Poster of the film
- Directed by: Satish Dasgupta; Digambar Chatterjee
- Screenplay by: Satish Dasgupta; Digambar Chatterjee; Pranab Roy; Shaktipada Rajguru; Narayan Chowdhury; Govinda Gupta; Swadesh Ranjan Dash
- Based on: Pather Dabi by Sarat Chandra Chattopadhyay
- Starring: Mihir Bhattacharya; Sumitra Devi; Devi Mukherjee; Jahar Ganguly; Chandrabati Devi; Kamal Mitra
- Edited by: Santosh Ganguly
- Music by: Dakshina Mohan Tagore
- Release date: 7 March 1947
- Country: India
- Language: Bengali

Pather Dabi (transl. The Right of Way) is a 1947 Bengali film directed by Satish Dasgupta and Digambar Chattopadhyay. Based on the celebrated novel of the same name by Sarat Chandra Chattopadhyay, the narrative centers on a secret revolutionary secret society called Pather Dabi led by Sabyasachi aiming to overthrow British colonial rule. The film critiques the British Raj and internal Indian social orthodoxies like caste and religion.

The film stars Mihir Bhattacharya as Apurbo, a timid, orthodox Bengali Brahmin who becomes a part of the clandestine organization, Pather Dabi, led by Sabyasachi and is then expelled after he is arrested and forced to reveal the mission and whereabouts of the secret society while Sumitra Devi features in the role of Bharati, Apurbo's love interest. Devi Mukherjee portrays Sabyasachi, the enigmatic leader whose passion for freedom forces him to be cold and ruthless at times, yet he is dedicated to the betterment of the oppressed. It also stars Jahar Ganguly, Chandrabati Devi, Kamal Mitra, Tulsi Chakraborty and Krishnadhan Mukhopadhyay. The film became a major financial success. Despite success, the film did not propel Mihir Bhattacharya's career to the top tier of Bengali cinema as his performance was overshadowed by Devi Mukherjee and Kamal Mitra who received bigger critical acclaim for their performances. The film received BFJA Awards for best film, best actress, best supporting actor and best supporting actress. This film was remade in Hindi as Sabyasachi in 1948.

== Plot ==
In Rangoon, Burma, Apurbo, an orthodox Brahmin finds himself drawn to Bharati, a young schoolteacher who introduces him to Pather Dabi, a secret revolutionary society led by Sabyasachi, also known as "The Doctor." Apurba’s involvement is cut short when he is arrested by the police. Under pressure and fear, he inadvertently provides information to the authorities. This act of perceived betrayal leads to his expulsion from the secret society. Shamed and isolated, Apurba struggles with his conscience, while Bharati remains a bridge between his world and the revolutionaries, often challenging the Doctor’s cold, militant logic with her own humanitarian views. As the British police tighten their net around the rebels, Sabyasachi continues to evade capture, while Apurba and Bharati are left to navigate their future in the wake of the organization's shifting movements.

== Cast ==
- Devi Mukherjee as Sabyasachi
- Jahar Ganguly
- Chandrabati Devi as Sumitra
- Mihir Bhattacharya as Apurbo
- Sumitra Devi as Bharati
- Kamal Mitra
- Tulsi Chakraborty
- Krishnadhan Mukhopadhyay

== Accolades ==
Year	Title	Category	Recipient	Result	Ref.
1948	BFJA Award	Best film		Won	
1948	BFJA Award	Best actress	Sumitra Devi	Won	
1948	BFJA Award	Best actor in a supporting role	Kamal Mitra	Won	
1948	BFJA Award	Best actress in a supporting role	Chandrabati Devi	Won	

== Bibliography ==
- Gouranga Prasad Ghosh (1982). Sonar Dag (in Bengali). Vol. 1. Yogomaya Prakashani. ASIN B0B5RM7D37.
- Rabi Basu (1996). Satrang (in Bengali). Vol. 1. Deep Prakashan.
