= Devi Chowdhurani (2025 film) =

2025 Indian historical action film by Subhrajit Mitra

- Theatrical release poster
- Directed by: Subhrajit Mitra
- Written by: Bankim Chandra Chatterjee
- Screenplay by: Subhrajit Mitra
- Story by: Bankim Chandra Chatterjee
- Based on: Devi Chaudhurani
- Produced by: Aniruddha Dasgupta; Aparna Dasgupta; Hassan Choudhury
- Starring: Prosenjit Chatterjee; Srabanti Chatterjee; Sabyasachi Chakrabarty; Arjun Chakrabarty; Alexx O'Nell; Bibriti Chatterjee; Kinjal Nanda; Darshana Banik; Carl Harte; Dr. Priyadarshini G. Roy
- Cinematography: Anirban Chatterjee
- Edited by: Sujay Dutta Ray
- Music by: Bickram Ghosh
- Production companies: ADited Motion Pictures; LOK Studios; HC Films; Moringa Studios
- Distributed by: Reliance Entertainment; SSR Cinemas
- Release date: 26 September 2025
- Running time: 134 minutes
- Countries: India; United Kingdom; United States
- Language: Bengali

Devi Chowdhurani is a 2025 Indian Bengali-language epic period action-adventure film directed by Subhrajit Mitra. Based on Bankim Chandra Chatterjee's novel of Devi Chaudhurani, the film is produced by Aniruddha Dasgupta and Aparna Dasgupta under the banner of ADited Motion Pictures (USA) and co-produced by Hassan Choudhury under the banner of HC Films Limited (UK).

Devi Chaudhurani stars Srabanti Chatterjee in the titular role, alongside Prosenjit Chatterjee, Sabyasachi Chakrabarty, Alexx O'Nell, Arjun Chakrabarty, Bibriti Chatterjee, Kinjal Nanda, Darshana Banik, Carl Harte, and Dr. Priyadarshini G. Roy in other pivotal roles.

Principal photography commenced in January 2024, with filming taking place in Kolkata and Purulia, West Bengal. After being delayed multiple times, the film was released in the theatres on 26 September 2025.

== Premise ==
Set in the 18th century, the period drama follows Prafulla's transformation from an innocent young girl into Devi Chaudhurani, a powerful bandit queen.

== Cast ==
- Srabanti Chatterjee as Prafullamukhi / Devi Chowdhurani
- Prosenjit Chatterjee as Bhavani Charan Pathak
- Sabyasachi Chakrabarty as Haraballabh Ray
- Arjun Chakrabarty as Rangaraj
- Bibriti Chatterjee as Nishi
- Kinjal Nanda as Brojeswar
- Darshana Banik as Sagar
- Bharat Kaul
- Alexx O'Nell as Captain Munroe
- Carl Harte
- Dr. Priyadarshini G. Roy as Diba

== Production ==
=== Development ===
In August 2023, it was reported that filming would begin in March 2024. The film is produced by Aniruddha Dasgupta and Aparna Dasgupta under the banner of ADited Motion Pictures, with Hassan Choudhury as co-producer under Hc Films Limited. Devi Chaudhurani is one of the most expensive Indian Bengali films ever made, with a budget of ₹25 crore. Besides directing, Subhrajit Mitra wrote the screenplay based on the novel Devi Chaudhurani by Bankim Chandra Chatterjee, and also wrote the dialogues. Pradyumna Kumar Swain was hired as the action choreographer.

=== Casting ===
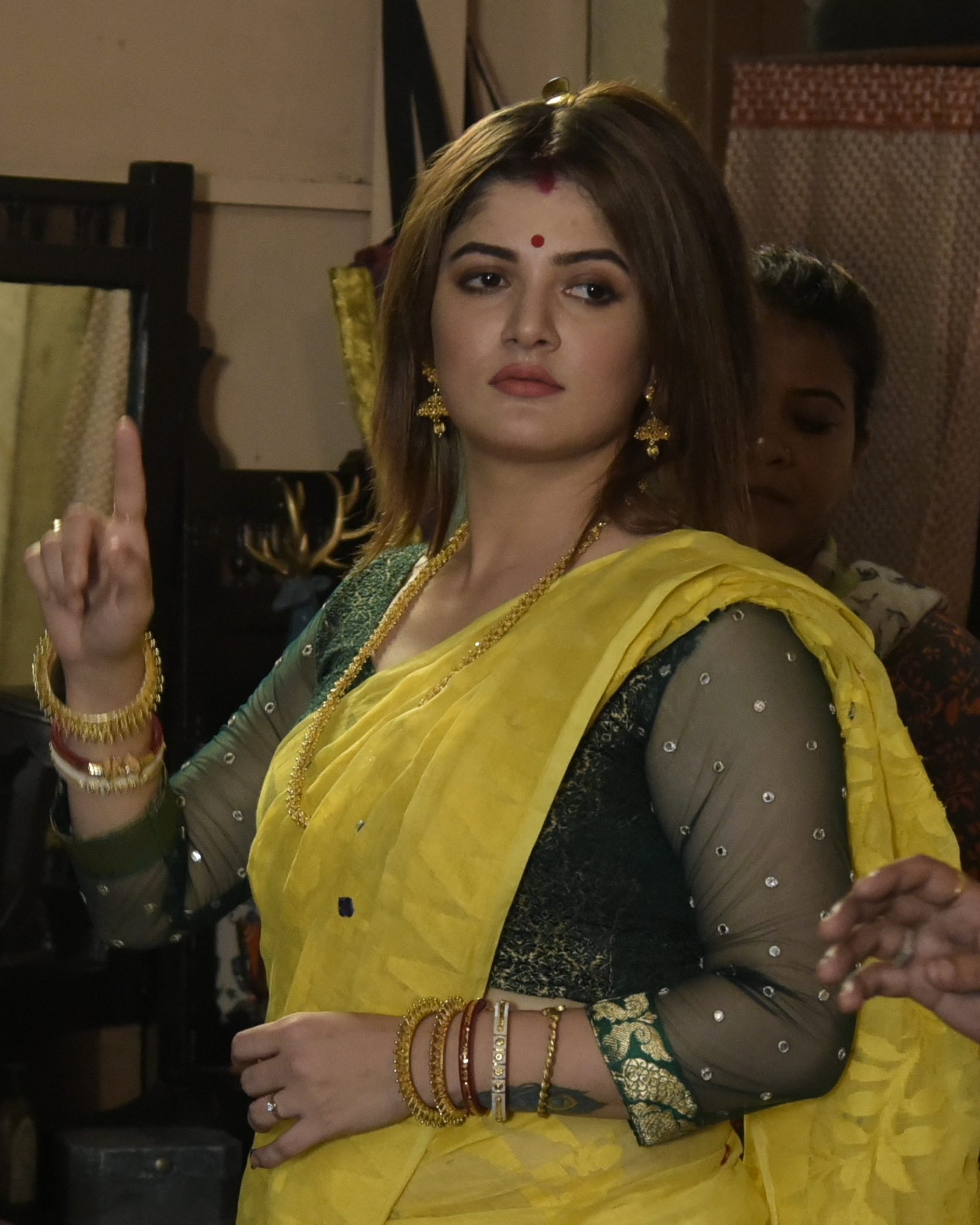
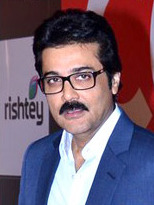
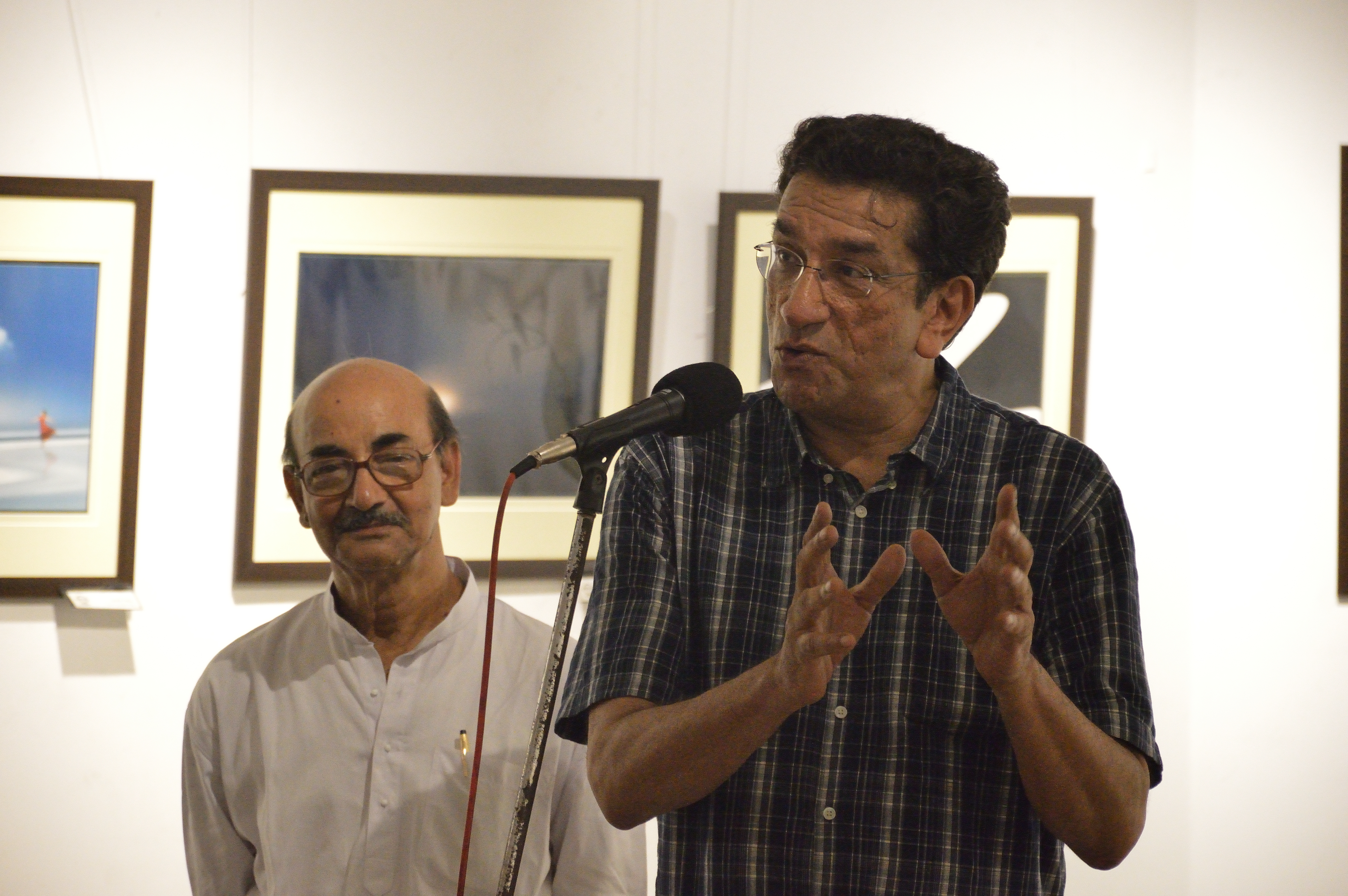
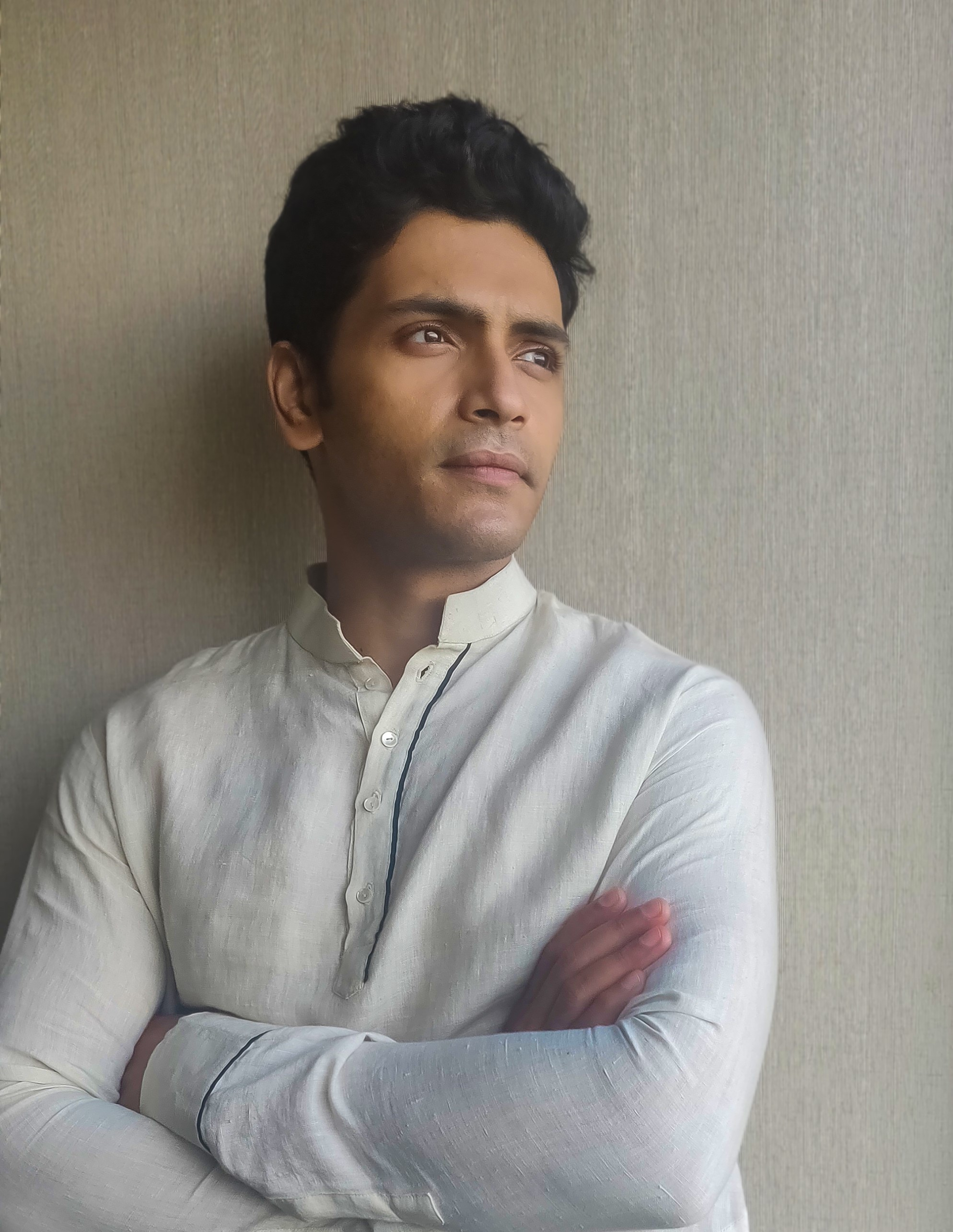
Srabanti, Prosenjit, Sabyasachi and Arjun (left to right)

The film marks Sabyasachi Chakraborty's comeback to films. In January 2023, Sabyasachi Chakraborty attended the 21st Dhaka International Film Festival in Bangladesh (East Bengal) as a special guest, where he told the media that he would be retiring from films for some time. However, Devi Choudhurani: Bandit Queen of Bengal's director Subhrajit Mitra chose Sabyasachi Chakrabarty to play the role of Zamindar Haravallav Ray in May 2023. Srabanti Chatterjee will play the role of Devi Chaudhurani, while Prosenjit Chatterjee will portray Bhavani Pathak, an important character in the film. Indraneil Sengupta was initially cast as Rangaraj, but actor Arjun Chakraborty was eventually roped in for the role. The film went to the floors on 27 January 2024.

=== Filming ===
The film was initially planned to begin shooting in November 2023 with around 250 crew members. However, delays pushed the start of filming to January 2024. Filming began on 27 January 2024 in North Kolkata, at Jimmy Laha's house. At that time, Srabanti Chatterjee, Sabyasachi Chakrabarty, Kinjal Nanda, and Darshana Banik took part in the shoot. On 28 January, the crew and production team arrived in Purulia district for the remaining shoot of the first phase. Srabanti was joined by Bibriti Chatterjee, Arjun Chakrabarty, and Dr. Priyadarshini G. Roy during filming. Various scenes were shot at the Ajodhya Hills and its foothills in Purulia, including sequences in the deep forest. Some fight scenes were filmed here, featuring talwar and bow and arrow combat. These scenes were shot between 28 January and the first week of February at various locations in Purulia district.

The second phase was filmed in Birbhum and Kolkata in West Bengal, as well as in the states of Jharkhand and Bihar. Prosenjit Chatterjee, who plays the character of Bhavani Charan Pathak, joined the shoot for this phase.

== Marketing ==
In late 2024, the makers unveiled the official pre-teaser, announcing that Devi Chaudhurani would be released in theatres on 1 May 2025. On 22 March 2025, the official teaser, starring Prosenjit Chatterjee and Srabanti Chatterjee, was released. On 8 May 2025, the film's teaser was showcased at the World Audio Visual & Entertainment Summit (WAVES) in Mumbai.

The makers announced "Bengal Tour" on 6 September 2025, to promote the film across several towns in West Bengal including Kolkata (Binodiini Theatre) on 7 September 2025, Raiganj (Surendranath College) on 9 September 2025, Malda (PRM Center Point Mall) on 9 September 2025, Barasat (Barasat Government College) on 11 September 2025, Howrah (Betai Jayanti Athletic Club) on 18 September 2025, Madhyamgram (Star Mall) on 19 September 2025, Durgapur (Chaturdanga City Center) on 22 September 2025, Tarapith (Tarapith Mandir) on 12 September 2025 and Burdwan (Sabuj Sangha) on 23 September 2025 in a Devi Chowdhurani themed bus, featuring the characters in giant posters all over the bus.

== Release ==
On 28 May 2025, the producers announced that Devi Chowdhurani would now be released in cinemas during Durga Puja 2025, shifting from its earlier May release window. It was released in the theatrical screens on 26 September 2025.

== Reception ==
=== Critical reception ===
Eshna Bhattacharya of The Times of India rated the film 3.5/5 stars and wrote "Despite these imperfections, Devi Chowdhurani is a landmark attempt - ambitious in scope, respectful to its literary roots, and unafraid to reinterpret when necessary. Its greatest triumph lies in how it revives Bankim’s heroine with dignity and fire, reminding audiences of her relevance as both history and myth." She applauded Srabanti and Prosenjit's peerformances, transition in Srabanti's character, cinematic arc of the novel, the supporting ensemble's performance, cinematography, background score and production design, the costumes and action choreography but bemoaned the visual effects in certain parts, few dragged stretches and weak narrative in certain scenes which unnecessarily delays the ending.

Ranjan Bandyopadhyay, in Sangbad Pratidin, gave the film high praise and appreciated the director for taking the story beyond the romantic cloudiness of Bankim's time and revealing the gory reality of the then history. According to him, this film showed the best performance of Prosenjit's career. Subhash K Jha, in a review for Bolly Spice, rated the film 3/5 stars and wrote "Devi Chowdhurani doesn’t quite capture the epic canvas of the novel. But it brings a wistful wisdom to the portrayal of the characters; even a British stooge like Haraballabh Ray is what he is on account of the historic forces that shaped Colonial India." He praised the emotional core of the film, the cinematography but bemoaned the action sequences for being diminished by budgetary constraints.

Shatakshi Ganguly of IWMBuzz rated the film 3.5/5 stars and opined "Subhrajit Mitra’s Devi Chowdhurani is not an attempt to retell a legend. It is a deliberate act of remembering — of giving space to a woman erased by time, relegated to folklore, and relegated to fiction. Here, she returns not as myth, but as a force." She praised Prosenjit's performance, termed Srabanti's performance as her career best, applauded the well written British characters, production design, dialogues, the script the background score but bemoaned the too slow pacing of the story.

Shubhajit Adhikari of Bartaman reviewed the film and noted "Devi Chaudhurani seems to have become more alive through the combination of literature, history and legends." He praised Srabanti in the action scenes, Prosenjit's portrayal as Bhabani Pathak, the fighting sequences, rooted Bengali culture throughout the film, the cinematography, editing and the background score but criticised the filming background mismatch from the original locations' background as written in the historical texts and the little awkward pure Bengali dialogues delivered the characters.
