= Gunanand Dangwal =

Indian freedom fighter

Gunanand Dangwal (1914 or 1915 – 2000), better known by his nom de plume Pathik was an Indian freedom fighter who played a leading role in the Tehri uprising.

He is known for his translation of Ramayana to Garhwali Ramayana (called Garh Bhasha Lila Ramayan), making it easier to be used in plays (Ramlila) in Garhwal region and compositions of folk and patriotic folk songs. Poet Manglesh Dabral has written in his poems about Pathik being a Marxist, who was present at Communist rallies and made some of his revolutionary songs on folk tunes.

Pathik died in 2000, at the age of 85 and is survived by his wife, Manorama, two sons and two daughters
