= Sumitra Devi (actress) =

Indian actress

- Sumitra Devi
- Born: Nilima Chatterjee; 22 July 1923; Suri, Birbhum, Bengal Presidency, British India
- Died: 28 August 1990 (aged 67); Mumbai, India
- Citizenship: Indian
- Occupation: Actress
- Years active: 1944–1964; 1974–1977
- Era: 1940s; 1950s
- Spouses: Devi Mukherjee (m. 1946; death 1947); J. L. Sharma (m. 1952)
- Children: 1
- Father: Muralidhar Chatterjee
- Relatives: Digambar Chatterjee (granduncle); Tarun Chatterjee (nephew) (Note: Sumitra Devi's grandfather Pitambar Chattterjee was the brother of Digambar Chatterjee who was the great grandfather of Tarun Chatterjee.)
- Awards: BFJA Awards

Sumitra Devi (22 July 1923 – 28 August 1990) was an Indian actress who is recognised for her work in Hindi as well as Bengali cinema during the 1940s and 1950s. Widely regarded as one of the greatest actresses of her time, she is best remembered for her role in the 1952 Hindi film Mamta directed by Dada Gunjal. She was the recipient of BFJA Award for Best Actress for three times. She was one of the exquisite beauties of her time and has been regarded as the most beautiful woman of her time by veterans such as Pradeep Kumar and Uttam Kumar.

In 1943 she was summoned for an interview and look test in the office of New Theatres and was finally cast opposite K. L. Saigal in Hemchander Chander's Meri Bahen (1944). During the making of this film she was offered to play the lead in Apurba Mitra's bilingual film Sandhi (1944) which happened to be her debut film and a major commercial success, earning her the BFJA Award for Best Actress in 1945. She turned down a host of substantial roles in both Bengali and Hindi cinema because of her marital allegiance to Devi Mukherjee, who reportedly insisted that she appear only in films starring him. Despite appearing only in six Bengali films — Abhijog (1947), Pather Dabi (1947), Pratibad (1948), Jayjatra (1948), Swami (1949) and Devi Chowdhurani (1949), she became a top-billed actress of Bengali cinema because of the commercial success of all the six films . Following the success in Nitin Bose's Mashaal (1950), she appeared in a string of Hindi films such as Mamta (1952), Deewana (1952), Ghungroo (1952), Mayurpankh (1954), Chor Bazar (1954), Raj Yogi Bharthari (1954) and Jagte Raho (1956). Dasyu Mohan (1955) marked her return to Bengali cinema. It was followed by a series of acclaimed performances in Shambhu Mitra's Ekdin Ratre (1956), Kartik Chattopadhyay's cult classics Saheb Bibi Golam (1956) and Nilachaley Mahaprabhu (1957), Haridas Bhattacharya's National Award winning Bengali film Aandhare Alo (1957), Ratan Chattopadhyay's Khela Bhangar Khela (1957), and Jibon Gangopadhyay's Joutuk (1958). After a hiatus of ten years, Sumitra Devi returned to the screen in Chandrakant Gaur's mythological film Har Har Mahadev (1974). In the late fifties, she was invited to the Asian Film Festival in China as a delegate from India.

== Early life ==
Sumitra Devi was born on 22 July 1923 in Suri, Birbhum, West Bengal. Her original name was Nilima Chatterjee. Her father Muralidhar Chatterjee was an advocate. Her grandfather Pitambar Chatterjee, the elder brother of Digambar Chatterjee, was an advocate at Patna High Court. Her brother Ranajit Chatterjee was also an advocate. She was brought up in Muzaffarpur, Bihar. In 1934, her family returned to their ancestral house in Maliara, after their house and estate in Muzaffarpur was demolished in the earthquake. She studied till the seventh grade. After her marriage, she settled in Bhagalpur, but then left her husband as he opposed her film career.

== Career ==
Sumitra Devi was highly influenced by the beauty and stature of Kanan Devi, Chandrabati Devi and Leela Desai, veteran actresses of 1930s, and aspired to be an actress.

She left her first husband in Bhagalpur and came to Kolkata to pursue a film career. She decided to send an application letter along with a photograph of her own to the office of New Theatres. As her father was conservative, she decided to do it secretly and to make her plan fruitful, she sought the help of her younger brother Ranajit, who agreed to cooperate with her. Her letter was answered and she was summoned for an interview and look test. At the office of New Theatres, she was asked to read lines from Tarasankar Bandyopadhyay's Ganadevata and she mesmerized everyone present there with her beauty as well as her lucid, euphonic voice. She was chosen for the leading role opposite K. L. Saigal in New Theatres's Meri Bahen (1944). Nilima adopted her screen name Sumitra Devi. Though Meri Bahen was supposed to be the debut film of Sumitra Devi, she finally made her debut with Apurba Mitra's bilingual film Sandhi (1944), which became a major financial success. There are different speculations regarding how she attained her role in Sandhi (1944). Anandalok wrote that she was stalled on her way to the shooting floor of Meri Bahen, by Apurba Mitra who offered her to act in his directorial venture. Cineplot claimed that it was actually Sumitra Devi herself who proposed Debaki Bose to act in his film and it was Bose who finally cast her in his nephew Apurba Mitra's directorial venture. According to the source, Bose wanted to enquire whether she had her father's consent to step into filmdom. She confessed that she did not have and her father was too conservative to provide his consent to this. As Bose was keen to cast her, he requested B. N. Sircar to persuade her father, Murali Chattopadhyay to give his consent. As B. N. Sircar was the son of Sir M. N. Sirkar, an eminent advocate and a close friend to Murali Chattopadhyay, he finally yielded to Sircar's imploration and reluctantly gave his consent. After the film released, she was applauded for her unlaboured acting skill as well as credited as having an "outstanding luminous screen presence". The film revolves around the oscillating relationship between a father and his son as the latter marries Rekha instead of marrying a girl whom his father chose for him. She portrays Rekha who takes initiative in the reunion of the father-son duo. The film won her the Bengal Film Journalists' Association - Best Actress Award in 1945. Meri Bahen (1944) achieved remarkable success upon release. It became the fourth highest-grossing film of the year.

Sumitra featured in Soumyen Mukhopadhyay's Hindi film Wasiyatnama (1945) which was originally an adaptation of veteran Bengali author Bamkim Chandra Chattopadhyay's famous novel Krishnakanter Will. In this film, she played Rohini the beautiful widow who seduces Govindlal to elope with him and ultimately gets killed by him. She earned rave reviews for her enticing as well as doleful performance in the film. Filmstaan wrote, "She had that melancholia which she manipulated together with her beauty to vitalize the character of Rohini."

Her next big turn was Satish Dasgupta and Digambar Chattopadhay's directorial venture Pather Dabi (1947) which was an adaptation of the renowned Bengali author Sarat Chandra Chattopadhyay's novel of the same name and also starred Debi Mukherjee in lead. She played Bharati. The film was a massive success at box office as its content dealt with the various aspects of contemporary Indian freedom movement. She attained positive review from critics for her performance in the film. She was again paired with Mukherjee in Sushil Majumdar's Abhijog (1947), which became another huge success at box office. Her next turn was Hemchandra Chandra's bilingual venture Oonch Neech (1948) whose Bengali version was released under the title Pratibad. The film achieved an enormous commercial success on both the national and regional front. She appeared in Niren Lahiri's bilingual film Vijay Yatra (1948) whose Bengali version was released under the title Joyjatra. Her next big turn was Satish Dasgupta's Debi Chowdhurani (1949 film) which was an adaptation of the renowned Bengali author Bankim Chandra Chattopadhyay's classic novel of the same name. She delineated the character of a Prafulla who is abandoned by her clink, gets kidnapped by some ruffians but manages to escape and hides herself in a lone forest where she meets a person who trains her as the leading figure of his gang of robbers. Indian columnist Rinki Bhattacharya appreciated her performance. The film was a major success at box office.

In 1950, she appeared in Nitin Bose's Hindi film Mashaal, which is based on Rajani, a famous Bengali novel by the veteran author Bankim Chandra Chottopadhyay. She played the character of Tarangini who is in love with the character of Samar, played by Ashok Kumar, but is compelled by her father to marry a wealthy landlord. The film achieved critical as well as commercial success. The year 1952 saw four of her Bollywood releases Deewana, Ghunghroo, Mamta, Raja Harischandra. Deewana and Ghunghroo received remarkable success at box office. Her other releases were Mayurpankh (1954), Chor Bazar (1954), Rajyogi Bharathi (1954), Jagte Raho (1956) and Delhi Darbar (1956), to name a few.

In 1955, she appeared in Ardhendu Mukhopadhyay's Bengali film Dasyu Mohan, which became a huge hit at the box office. In 1956, she appeared in Pinaki Mukhopadhyay's Bengali film Asabarna (1956) and Kartik Chattopadhyay's blockbuster Saheb Bibi Golam (1956), which is an adaptation of Bimal Mitra's classic novel of the same name. She plays the character of a beautiful, alcoholic wife of an aristocrat, who forms a loving yet platonic relationship with the protagonist Bhootnath. She has been most remembered for her role in this film. Director Kartik Chattopadhyay was keen to cast her in the role of the beautiful, eeyorish mistress of the junior landlord, but felt on edge at the same time as he thought that she might be repulsed by this role as it mirrored her conjugal life to some extent. He found his breath when Sumitra Devi gave her consent.

"Initially I was getting befogged whether she would love the script or reject it. I kept narrating on and she was there with those inert eyes, patiently sitting on her couch and listening to me. Once in a while she was enquiring into something but that was all. Overall she became reticent. As I went on, I saw her altering her posture with her elbow supported on the armrest of her couch and I envisioned the scenario at once, the scenario of Bhootnath sitting before a prepossessing Pateshwari boozing over her elbow rested on her lavish cushion."

— Kartik Chattopadhyay during an interview session with Ekaal

The film was released on 9 March 1956 and turned out as a massive hit at the box office. In 1957, she appeared in Kartik Chattopadhyay's another blockbuster Nilachaley Mahaprabhu. She was further adulated for her role as a nautch girl in Haridas Bhattacharya's National Award winning film Aandhare Alo (1957).

"I was certain that, with those transfixing attributes, she would be the best choice for the role of Bijali. I didn’t have to direct her at all. She herself figured it out how to render Bijali, how to interpret her journey from an enticing, playful coquette to an ardent devotee of love."

— Haridas Bhattacharya during on an interview session with Ekaal

In 1958, she was paired with Uttam Kumar in Jiban Gangopadhgay's ambitious venture Joutuk. Sumitra Devi's reign began to slow down in the sixties. In 1964, she rendered the character of Draupadi in Chandrakant Gor's Hindi film Veer Bhimsen. In O. C. Gangopadhyay's Kinu Gowalar Gali (1964), she enacted the role of Shanti who is desperate to win back her husband's love for her. Her performance in the film won critical favour.

== Personal life ==
Sumitra Devi left her first marriage in Bhagalpur as her in-laws opposed her aspiration to become an actress. She married actor Devi Mukherjee on 21 October 1946. On 1 December 1947, she gave birth to her son Bulbul and on 10 December 1947, Mukherjee passed away. Afterwards, she married J. L. Sharma, the producer of Mamta.

== Legacy ==
I think I would walk out of a lot of due compliments if I just use the term ‘beautiful’ to describe Sumitra Devi. She has the face that can arrest an unblinking gaze for long. She is marvellous. At the same time, I hold regards to the noble way she demonstrates herself. It is her etiquette and politeness that brighten up her beauty.

— Shammi Kapoor on Sumitra Devi

Sumitra Devi was known for her exquisite beauty and subtle administration of seduction. It was said that she often cast her spell on the actors, directors, producers and journalists of her time. Her Dasyu Mohan co-actor Pradeep Kumar, who described her as an "instance of the perfect harmonization of beauty and glory", used to come to the set of the film even when he had no schedule of shooting and spend his time sitting by and watching her raptly. Uttam Kumar too, was spellbound before her on the set of Kartik Chattopadhyay's Saheb Bibi Golam. Raj Kapoor said: "Sumitra Devi doesn't need any reference; she is beautiful than anything else." Shammi Kapoor said: "She has the face that can arrest an unblinking gaze for long."

== Accolades ==
Title	Year	Category	Work	Result	Ref.
BFJA Award	1945	Best actress	Sandhi	Won	
BFJA Award	1948	Best actress	Pather Dabi	Won	
BFJA Award	1950	Best actress	Swami	Won	

== Filmography ==
=== Hindi Films ===
Year	Title	Role	Director	Note	Ref.
1944	Sandhi	Rekha	Apurba Mitra		
1944	Meri Bahen	Krishna	Hemchander Chunder		
1945	Wasiyatnama	Rohini	Soumyen Mukherji		
1948	Oonch Neech	Madhvi	Hemchander Chunder		
1948	Vijay Yatra	Jayanti	Niren Lahiri		
1950	Mashaal		Nitin Bose		
1952	Diwana		Abdur Rashid Kardar		
1952	Mamta		Gunjal		
1952	Raja Harischandra		Raman B. Desai		
1952	Ghungroo		Hiren Bose	Double role	
1954	Mayurpankh		Kishore Sahu		
1954	Chor Bazar		P. N. Arora		
1954	Raj Yogi Bharthari		Raman B. Desai		
1955	Ganga Maiya		Chandrakant Gaur		
1955	Chirag-E-Chin		Chimanlal Trivedi		
1956	Jagte Raho		Amit Maitra		
1956	Sati Ansuya		Dhirubhai Desai		
1956	Delhi Darbar		Chandrakant Gaur		
1958	Hum Bhi Kuchh Kam Nahin		Raman B. Desai		
1962	Kailashpati		Dhirubhai Desai		
1963	Mere Arman Mere Sapne		Arabind Sen		
1964	Veer Bhimsen		Chandrakant Gaur		
1974	Har Har Mahadev		Chandrakant Gaur	Cameo	
1976	Bajrangbali		Chandrakant Gaur		
1977	Bolo He Chakradhari			Cameo	

=== Bengali films ===
Year	Title	Role	Director	Note	Ref.
1944	Sandhi	Rekha	Apurba Mitra		
1947	Pather Dabi	Bharati	Satish Dasgupta, Digambar Chattopadhyay		
1947	Abhijog	Basanti	Sushil Majumdar		
1948	Pratibad	Madhabi	Hemchandra Chandra		
1948	Joyjatra	Jayanti	Niren Lahiri		
1949	Debi Chowdhurani	Prafulla	Satish Dasgupta		
1949	Swami	Soudamini	Pashupati Chattopadhyay		
1950	Samar		Nitin Bose		
1951	Niyoti		Naresh Mitra		
1955	Dasyu Mohan		Ardhendu Mukhopadhyay		
1956	Asabarna		Pinaki Mukhopadhyay		
1956	Saheb Bibi Golam	Pateshwai	Kartik Chattopadhyay		
1956	Ekdin Ratre		Sambhu Mitra, Amit Maitra		
1957	Aandhare Alo		Haridas Bhattacharya		
1957	Garer Math		Aaj Productions Unit		
1957	Khela Bhangar Khela		Ratan Chattopadhyay		
1957	Nilachaley Mahaprabhu		Kartik Chattopadhyay		
1958	Joutuk		Jiban Gangopadhyay		
1959	Thakur Haridas	Lakshaheera	Gobinda Ray		
1964	Kinu Gowalar Gali		O. C. Gangopadhyay		

== Bibliography ==
- Neepa Majumdar. Wanted Cultured Ladies Only!. University of Illinois Press. ISBN 9780252091780.
- Rabi Basu (1996). Satrang (in Bengali). Vol. 1. Deep Prakashan.
- Tarun Majumder. Cinemapara Diye (in Bengali). Dey's Publishing.
- Sharmistha Gooptu. Bengali Cinema. Taylor and Francis. ISBN 9781136912177.
- Gouranga Prasad Ghosh (1982). Sonar Dag (in Bengali). Vol. 1. Yogomaya Prakashani. ASIN B0B5RM7D37.
- Sankalan, Anandabazar Patrika (2013). Anandasangi (in Bengali). Vol. 1. Ananda Publishers. ISBN 978-8172153793.
- Patel, Baburao (March 1949). Film India.
