= Debi Chowdhurani (TV series) =

Indian Bengali television series

- Based on: Devi Chaudhurani by Bankim Chandra Chattopadhyay
- Written by: Writam Ghosal
- Directed by: Amit Sengupta
- Starring: Sonamoni Saha; Rahul Mazumdar
- Opening theme: Debi Chaudhurani
- Composer: Upali
- Country of origin: India
- Original language: Bengali
- No. of episodes: 420

Production
- Executive producer: Pallabi Basu
- Producer: Subrata Roy
- Production locations: Kolkata, West Bengal, India
- Camera setup: Multi-camera setup
- Running time: 22 minutes
- Production company: Subrata Roy Productions

Original release
- Network: Star Jalsha
- Release: 16 July 2018 – 25 October 2019

Debi Chowdhurani was an Indian Bengali-language period drama television series that premiered on 16 July 2018 and aired daily on Star Jalsha. Based on Bankim Chandra Chatterjee's novel of Devi Chaudhurani, it was produced by Subrata Roy, Joydeb Mondal, and starred Sonamoni Saha and Rahul Mazumdar in the lead roles. Sujan Mukhopadhyay, Tanima Sen, and Rayati Bhattacharya, among others, appeared in supporting roles. Upon its launch, the series became one of the most-watched shows on Star Jalsha.

The series is an onscreen adaptation of Bankim Chandra Chattopadhyay’s novel of the same name. Bankim Chandra’s work called for a resurgent India that resisted the oppression of the British Empire through the strength of the common people, based on traditional Indian values of austerity, dedication, and selflessness. He placed a female protagonist at the centre of the struggle, fighting against the tyranny of oppressive zamindars and the British Raj.

== Synopsis ==
Based on the novel by Bankim Chandra Chattopadhyay, the series follows the journey of Prafulla, an innocent young woman who transforms into Devi Chaudhurani, a formidable bandit queen.

The show portrays Prafulla’s evolution from an ordinary village girl into an iconic leader and legendary warrior. As Debi Chaudhurani, she becomes the saviour of the poor, revered and respected by all. She wages battle against the British Empire and cruel zamindars, inspiring women to break purdah and join the struggle for independence. Prafulla’s transformation into a figure feared by the British and admired by her people has resonated with Bengali audiences across generations. Depicted as a revered leader, moral guide, and embodiment of austerity and selflessness, Debi Chaudhurani remains a powerful symbol of Bengali womanhood.

== Cast ==
- Sonamoni Saha as Prafullamukhi Rai ("Prafulla") / Debi Chaudhurani – Titular protagonist
- Rahul Mazumdar as Brojeswar Rai ("Brojo") – Prafulla’s husband
- Sujan Mukhopadhyay as Haraballabh Rai – Greedy zamindar; Brojo’s father and Prafulla’s father-in-law
- Awrkojyoti Roy as Kartiar Saheb – British officer
- Sanjib Dasgupta as Bhavani Pathak
- Biplab Chatterjee
- Sudip Sarkar as Sardar – A dacoit in Bhavani Pathak’s troop
- Subhra Sourav Das as East India Company officer
- Sritoma Bhattacharya as Diba – A dacoit in Bhavani Pathak’s troop
- Kanyakumari Mukherjee as Nishi – A dacoit in Bhavani Pathak’s troop
- Mahua Haldar
- Sagnik as Bishaai Dakat
- Subhamoy Chatterjee as a selfish and greedy purohit
- Adrija Mukherjee as young Prafulla
- Rayati Bhattacharya as Prafulla’s mother
- Tanima Sen as Brojeswar’s grandmother; Haraballabh’s paternal aunt
- Jack as a selfish zamindar
- Rupsha Guha
- Dipanjan Bhattacharya
- Anindya Banerjee
- Priyantika Karmakar as Sagar Bou
- Seenchita Sanyal as Nayan Bou

== See also ==
- Karunamoyee Rani Rashmoni
