= Hamrahi (1945 film) =

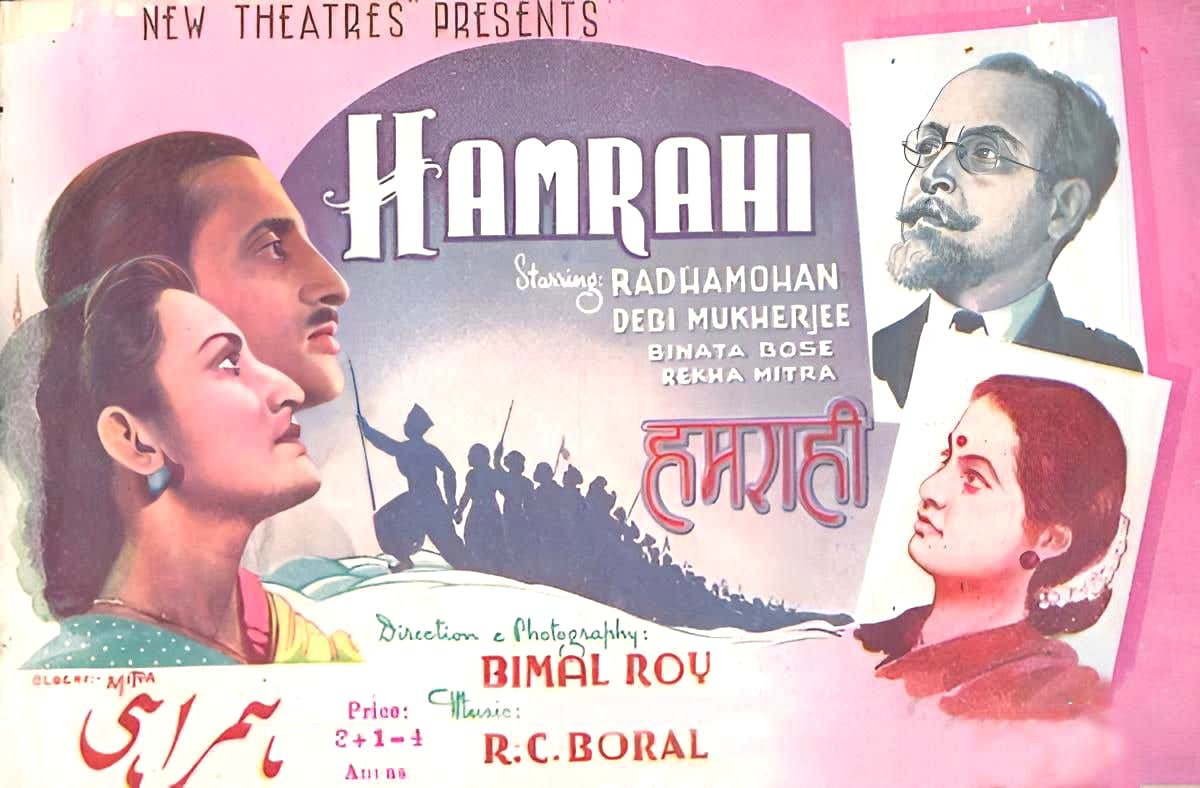
- Poster
- Directed by: Bimal Roy
- Written by: Jyotirmoy Roy; Mohanlal Bajpai (dial in Hindi)
- Produced by: New Theatres, Calcutta
- Starring: Radhamohan Bhattacharya; Binota Bose; Devi Mukherjee; Rekha Mitra
- Cinematography: Bimal Roy
- Music by: R. C. Boral
- Production companies: New Theatres, Calcutta
- Release date: 1945
- Running time: 121 minutes
- Country: India
- Language: Hindi

Hamrahi (transl. Companion/Partner), is a 1945 Hindi social drama film of Indian cinema. The bilingual film was a remake of its popular Bengali version called Udayer Pathey (1944). Bimal Roy, after working as a cinematographer with New Theatres, Calcutta, launched into feature film direction. Udayer Pathey was Roy's debut film as a director of Bengali films, while Hamrahi was his first directorial venture in Hindi cinema. The original story and dialogues for the Bengali version were written by Jyotirmoy Roy, with the dialogues in Hindi written by Mohanlal Bajpai. It was produced by New Theatres, Calcutta, and shot by Bimal Roy. The music was composed by Raichand Boral and the lyrics were by Zakir Husain. The film included Rabindranath Tagore's song, "Jana Gana Mana", even before it became the national anthem of India.

The story was similar in theme to those used frequently for screen, highlighting the disparity between the rich and poor. Radhamohan Bhattacharya as Anup, an idealistic man from the poor ranks of society takes on the exploiting capitalist group represented by Rajendra. Binota Roy plays the role of Gopa, Anup's love interest and companion, who belongs to a wealthy family.

== Plot ==
Anup (Radhamohan) lives with his mother and sister, Sumitra (Rekha Mitra/Mallick). He writes at a newspaper office to make a living. Sumitra is friends with a rich girl, Gopa (Binota Bose/Roy). Gopa is celebrating her birthday and invites Sumitra to the party. Gopa's sister-in-law Roopa, who alleges that Sumitra is a thief, humiliates Sumitra. Gopa repulsed at Roopa's blatant arrogance and show of wealth goes to Sumitra's house to apologise. She meets Anup there who refuses to accept her apology, equating the insult to all poor people.

Anup's boss sends him to Rajendra's office for some writing work. Rajendra is Gopa's brother and Roopa's husband. He needs a speech and commissions Anup to write it for him. The speech is well received at the function Rajendra attends, and he develops pretensions of being a writer. Rajendra manages to steal the manuscript of a novel Anup is working on, which has an idealistic theme on poverty. He has it published with his name as the author, getting critical acclaim for his intellectual abilities.

Rajendra's company workers go on a strike, dissatisfied with the pay and conditions of the factory. Anup and Gopa get involved in the factory workers' problem and join them in their agitation. Rajendra with the help of bribed workers and local goons disrupts the strike. Disillusioned by wealth and hypocrisy, Gopa sympathises with the workers. She leaves her home and comfort behind and joins Anup.

== Cast ==
- Radhamohan Bhattacharya as Anup
- Binota Roy as Gopa
- Devi Mukherjee as Sourin
- Rekha Mallick as Sumitra
- Tulsi Chakraborty
- Rajlashmi Devi
- Devbala

== Review and reception ==
Baburao Patel, editor of Filmindia called it "a picture for intellectuals" that fulfilled "the higher purpose for which the screen is intended". In his review in the October 1945 issue of Filmindia, Patel wrote that though it was not the best picture from New Theatres, it was one of the best in recent times (circa 1940s). Bimal Roy, an unknown director at the time, was lauded for using a new cast of characters for the film, who managed to leave "vivid impressions". Patel singled out the lead characters for their performances stating, "Radhamohan's stoic restraint, his unintrusive culture and his spiritual identification with the role that he plays, give his portrayal the requisite dramatic intensity needed for the theme. Radhamohan has given a remarkable performance", while "Binota is an artiste of very high calibre. All the while, she knows what she is doing and she acquits herself with suitable dignity and poise through numerous situations". The film was praised for its dialogues, "The most brilliant feature of the picture is its dialogue". Roy's direction was hailed as "The direction of Bimal Roy is an excellent beginning to his new profession". Patel continued with his positive critique by stating, "There is no pseudo-Russian technique about it nor any Hollywood glamour shots. And yet, not a single shot was badly taken throughout the picture". His negative comments about the film were that "it dragged in the first three reels", and that though ""Hamrahi" propagates its theme beautifully", it did so by focusing on just a handful of people to highlight the poor-rich situation thus losing "its universal appeal".

According to authors Vasudev and Lenglet, in their book "Indian Cinema Superbazaar", Hamrahi was "Technically, innovative and thematically bold, with the film giving every indication of the mark its maker was to leave on the Indian Cinema".

Hamrahi and its Bengali version Udayer Pathey received a positive response from the audiences, making both a success at the box-office. Nasreen Munni Kabir gives the reason for the film's popularity in her book, The Dialogues of Devdas, where she quotes director Ritwik Ghatak from the cine-mag, Filmfare, (4 March 1966), "People for the first time saw in them their everyday life – this revolutionised the concept of film as a social document of contemporary reality".

== Music ==
The music direction was by Raichand Boral and the lyrics were by Zakir Husain. The film included Rabindranath's "Jana Gana Mana", which became the national anthem of India following Independence. Most of the songs were sung by Binota Bose, with one duet by Hemant Kumar and two songs sung as chorus.

=== Soundtrack ===
Songlist:

#	Title	Singer
1	"Jana Gana Mana"	Chorus
2	"Badhte Chalo Jawano"	Chorus
3	"Gaye Ja Tu Apna Geet"	Rekha Mallick
4	"Madhu Gandhe Bhara"	Binota Bose, Hemant Kumar
5	"Hansi Chand Ki Aaj Nirali"	Binota Bose
6	"Din Hai Bahaar Ke Aaye"	Binota Bose
7	"Jigar Ke Daag"	Binota Bose
