= Devi Mukherjee =

Indian actor (born 1903)

- Devi Mukherjee in Joyjatra
- Born: January 27, 1903; Chhapra, Bihar, British India
- Died: December 10, 1947 (aged 44); Calcutta, West Bengal, India
- Occupation: Actor
- Years active: 1925–1947
- Spouses: Sumitra Devi (m. 1946) (Note: Second wife)
- Children: 2
- Father: Prabodh Chandra Mukherjee
- Relatives: Gautam Mukherjee (brother); Bhaswar Chatterjee (grand nephew)
- Awards: BFJA Award

Devi Mukherjee (also known as Devi Mukhopadhyay) was an Indian actor who is known for his work in Bengali and Hindi cinema and theatre . He received several awards including a BFJA Award. Renowned for his distinctively resonant and masculine tone, he was often likened to Clark Gable by Indian media. He consistently prioritised projecting charisma and masculinity over showcasing transformative acting range, and his contemporaries and audiences alike perceived him as the quintessential epitome of masculinity. He received critical acclaim for portraying both idealistic and antagonistic roles.

In 1925, Mukherjee began his career as a thespian actor with a small role in Minerva Theatre's stage adaptation of Atmadarshan, a Bengali play by Mahatap Chandra Ghosh. He rose to fame for his role as Souren in Hamrahi (1944) directed by Bimal Roy. Afterwards, he cemented his status as one of the bankable actors of Bengali cinema with his roles in films such as Bhabikal (1945), Abhijog (1947), Roy Chowdhury (1947), Shrinkhal (1947), Pather Dabi (1947), Pratibad (1948) and Joyjatra (1948).

== Early life ==
Devi Mukherjee was born in Chhapra, Bihar, on 27 January 1903. His father Prabodh Chandra Mukherjee was an advocate in Serampore.

== Career ==
In 1925, Devi Mukherjee began his career as a thespian actor with a small role in Minerva Theatre's stage adaptation of Atmadarshan, a Bengali play by Mahatap Chandra Ghosh. His portrayed Basudam in Phani Burma's Bengali film Prabhas Milan (1937). The screenplay of the film was written by poet Krishnadhan Dey. Mukherjee's performance as police officer Ghoshal in Nitin Bose's Bichar (1943) won him critical favour. He rose to fame for his role as Sourindranath in Udayer Pathe (1944) directed by Bimal Roy. Based on Jyotirmoy Roy's story, the narrative revolves around a writer who opposes class discrimination. Radhamohan Bhattacharya played the protagonist in the film. The film became a major critical and commercial success.

Mukherjee accumulated major critical acclaim portraying Shibnath Chowdhury in Bhabikal (1945) directed by Niren Lahiri. The film follows Somnath who is torn between his idealistic father Shibnath Chowdhury and his capitalist father-in-law Kedar Sanyal. Filmindia wrote that Mukherjee's performance was masterly and perfect. The film earned him BFJA Award for Best actor in 1946.

Mukherjee starred in Amar Mallik's social drama film Biraj Bou (1946) based on Sarat Chandra Chatterjee's story of the same name. The screenplay of the film was written by Nripendra Krishna Chatterjee. He portrayed Rajendra, a salacious, rich man who is illegitimately interested in Biraj, the protagonist portrayed by Sunanda Devi. According to Rabi Basu, Mukherjee was convincing and breathtaking as Rajendra.

Mukherjee starred alongside Mihir Bhattacharya, Sumitra Devi, Chandrabati Devi and Jahar Ganguly in Pather Dabi (1947) directed by Satish Dasgupta and Digambar Chatterjee. The film became a major box office success.

Mukherjee committed suicide when Gunomoy Banerjee's thriller Bish Bachchar Aage (1948) was on the floor.

== Accolades ==
Title	Year	Category	Work	Result	Ref.
BFJA Award	1946	Best actor	Bhabikal	Won	

== Filmography ==
Year	Title	Role	Note	Ref.
1935	Jawani Ki Hawa			
1937	Prabhas Milan	Basudam		
1940	Shuktara	Baren		
1941	Aasra	Ashok		
1941	Bahen			
1941	Kasauti			
1942	Fariyaad			
1942	Khilona	Vijay		
1943	Bichar	Ghoshal		
1944	Meri Bahen			
1944	Udayer Pathe	Sourin		
1945	Abhinoy Noy			
1945	Ban Phool			
1945	Bhabikal	Shibnath Chowdhury		
1945	Wasiyatnama			
1946	Arabian Nights			
1946	Biraj Bou	Rajendra		
1946	Krishna Leela			
1946	Natun Bou			
1946	Pratima			
1947	Abhijog	Subir		
1947	Dui Bandhu			
1947	Jagaran			
1947	Pather Dabi	Sabyasachi		
1947	Roy Chowdhury			
1947	Shrinkhal			
1948	Chalaar Pathe			
1948	Pratibad			
1948	Joyjatra	Jyotiprakash		
1948	Bish Bachhar Aage			
1951	Ganyer Meye			

== Bibliography ==
- Bhanu Banerjee (2018). Bhanu Samagra (in Bengali). Patrabharati. ISBN 9788183744751.
- Kalish Mukherjee (1951). Rupmancha (in Bengali).
- Rabi Basu (1996). Satrang (in Bengali). Vol. 1. Deep Prakashan.
- Sharmistha Gooptu. Bengali Cinema. Taylor and Francis. ISBN 9781136912177.
- Gouranga Prasad Ghosh (1982). Sonar Dag (in Bengali). Vol. 1. Yogomaya Prakashani. ASIN B0B5RM7D37.
- Sankalan, Anandabazar Patrika (2013). Anandasangi (in Bengali). Vol. 1. Ananda Publishers. ISBN 978-8172153793.
- Deshpande, Anirudh (2026). Critical Social Science Perspective on Indian Cinema. ISBN 9781041247401.
- Dashgupta, Biplab (1993). Nandan.
