= Devi Chowdhurani (1974 film) =

Indian Bengali-language epic period action-adventure film

- Directed by: Dinen Gupta
- Written by: Bankim Chandra Chattopadhyay
- Based on: Devi Chaudhurani by Bankim Chandra Chattopadhyay
- Produced by: Dinen Gupta
- Starring: Suchitra Sen; Ranjit Mallick; Kali Banerjee; Chhaya Devi; Sumitra Mukherjee; Haradhan Bandopadhyay; Jahor Roy; Premangshu Bose; Nripati Chatterjee; Satya Banerjee; Ajoy Bandyopadhyay
- Cinematography: Satyen Chattopadhyay
- Music by: Manabendra Mukhopadhyay
- Production companies: Angel Digital Private Limited; Sanchayita Films
- Release date: 6 September 1974
- Running time: 141 minutes
- Country: India
- Language: Bengali

Devi Chowdhurani is a 1974 Indian Bengali-language epic period action-adventure film produced, cinematographed and directed by Dinen Gupta under the banner of Sanchayita Films. Based on the 1884 novel of the same name by Bankim Chandra Chattopadhyay, the film stars Suchitra Sen in the titular role, alongside Ranjit Mallick, Basanta Choudhury and Sumitra Mukherjee in lead roles. It also features Kali Banerjee, Chhaya Devi, Haradhan Bandopadhyay and Jahor Roy in other supporting roles.

Set against the backdrop of Sanyashi rebellion (1763–1777), the film depicts on the life of an ordinary woman who transforms into an 18th century bandit, during colonial unrest in Bengal. It is the second screen adaptation of Devi Chowdhurani, and marks Gupta's first collaboration with Mallick. Music of the film is composed by Manabendra Mukhopadhyay, with lyrics penned by Pulak Bandyopadhyay and Shyamal Gupta.

== Plot ==
Prafullamukhi, a compassionate and righteous young woman, is mistreated by her in-laws due to her poverty. Through a twist of fate, she acquires a fortune and is guided by the nationalist leader Bhabani Pathak. Under his mentorship, she transforms into a trained bandit queen known as Devi Chaudhurani. She fights colonial British forces to protect villagers and ultimately brings her former oppressors into reconciliation.

== Cast ==
- Suchitra Sen as Prafullamukhi / Devi Chowdhurani
- Ranjit Mallick as Brajeshwar Rai, Prafulla's husband
- Kali Banerjee as Haraballav Rai, Brajeshwar's father
- Chhaya Devi
- Sumitra Mukherjee
- Haradhan Bandopadhyay
- Jahor Roy
- Premangshu Bose
- Nripati Chattopadhyay
- Satya Banerjee
- Ajoy Bandyopadhyay

== Crew ==
- Director: Dinen Gupta
- Producer: Dinen Gupta
- Story: Bankim Chandra Chattopadhyay
- Music: Pulak Bandyopadhyay, Shyamal Gupta
- Cinematography: Satyen Chattopadhyay

== Production ==
The film was produced under the banners of Angel Digital Private Limited and Sanchayita Films.

== Release ==
Devi Chaudhurani was released theatrically in India on 6 September 1974, with a runtime of approximately 141 minutes.

== Legacy ==
The film is remembered for Suchitra Sen’s portrayal of the title role. Decades later, actress Rituparna Sengupta was cast to reprise the role of Devi Chaudhurani in a new adaptation, drawing comparisons with Sen’s performance. Film scholars have also discussed Sen’s performance in the context of her screen pairings, notably alongside Ranjit Mallick in this film.
