= Pramathanath Bishi =

Indian writer and politician

- Born: 11 June 1901; Joyari Village, Natore District, British India
- Died: 10 May 1985 (aged 83); Kolkata, West Bengal, India
- Other name: Pra. Na. Bi (প্র.না.বি)
- Education: Rajshahi College; University of Calcutta
- Known for: Bengali Literature
- Awards: Rabindra Puraskar (1960), Padma Shri (1971), Vidyasagar Smrti Puraskar (1982), Jagattarini Puraskar (1983)

Member of Parliament, Rajya Sabha
- In office 3 April 1972 – 2 April 1978
- Constituency: Nominated

Pramatha Nath Bishi (11 June 1901 – 10 May 1985) was an Indian writer, educationist, and parliamentarian from West Bengal. He was a member of the West Bengal Legislative Council (1962–1968) and a nominated member of the Rajya Sabha from 1972 to 1978.

== Early life and education ==
Bishi was born on 11 June 1901 at Joari in Rajshahi, the son of Nalininath Bishi and Sarojbasini Devi. He studied for seventeen years at Brahma Vidyalaya in Santiniketan, where he became closely acquainted with Rabindranath Tagore. He passed the matriculation (1919) from Santiniketan and took a break of several years before going on to complete the IA (1927) and BA with honours in English from Rajshahi College (1929). He then took an MA in Bangla (1932) from Calcutta University, standing first class first. He carried on research on a Ramtanu Lahiri Research Fellowship (1933-1936). He married Suruchi Devi, daughter of a noted Advocate of Rajshahi named Sudarshan Chakravarty. They had two sons named Kanishka Bishi and Milinda Bishi and a daughter named Chirashree Bishi.

== Career ==
He joined Ripon College (1936–1946) and then Calcutta University (1950) as professor of Bangla. He was Rabindra Professor and Head of the Department of Bangla, Calcutta University (1963–66). He also worked as editor of the Santiniketan (1931) and assistant editor of Anandabazar Patrika (1946–1949). He retired in 1971. He was also a member of West Bengal Bidhan Sabha (1962). He died in Calcutta on 10 May 1985.

== Writing ==
Bishi was a prolific writer in several genres: poetry, satire, short story, novel, drama, essay and criticism. He wrote under various pseudonyms, such as Pranabi, Kamalakanta, Haturi, Bishnu Sharma, Amit Ray, Madhabya, Scot Thomson. Among his published novels are Desher Shatru (1924), Padma (1935), Jodadighir Chaudhuri Paribar (1938), Keshabati (1941), Nilmanir Svarga (1954), Sindhudesher Prahari (1955), Carey Saheber Munsi (1958), Lal Kella (1963), Ashvatther Abhishap, Chalan Beel, etc. His books of short stories include Shrikanter Pancham Parba (1944), Galper Mato Galpa (1945), Gali O Galpa (1945), Dakini (1945), Brahmar Hasi (1948), Nilbarna Shrgal (1956), Alaukik (1957), Bichitra Sanglap (1955), Svanirbachita Galpa (1960), etc. His books of poems are Dewali (1923), Basanta Sena O Anyanya Kavita (1927), Bidyasundar (1935), Juktabeni (1948), Shakuntala O Anyanya Kavita (1946), Hangha Mithun (1950), Uttar Megh (1953), Kingshuk Bahni (1959), Shrestha Kavita (1961), etc. His dramas are Rnang Krtta (1935), Ghrtang Pibet (1941), Mauchake Dhil (1945), Government Inspector (1944), Permit (1956), etc. His essays are included in Banglar Lekhak (1950), Jawharlal Nehru- Byakti O Byaktitva (1951), Bangla Sahityer Nara Nari (1953), Kamala Kanter Asar (1955), Nana Rakam (1958), Rabindra Kavya Prabaha, Rabindra Kavya Nirjhar, Rabindranath O Santiniketan, Rabindra Natya Prabaha, Rabindra Bichitra, Rabindra Sarani, etc. He also edited Bhudev Rachana Sambhar, Vidyasagar Rachana Sambhar, etc.

== Awards ==
- Rabindra Puraskar (1960)
- Padma Shri (1971)
- Vidyasagar Smrti Puraskar (1982)
- Jagattarini Puraskar (1983)
