= List of songs recorded by K. L. Saigal =

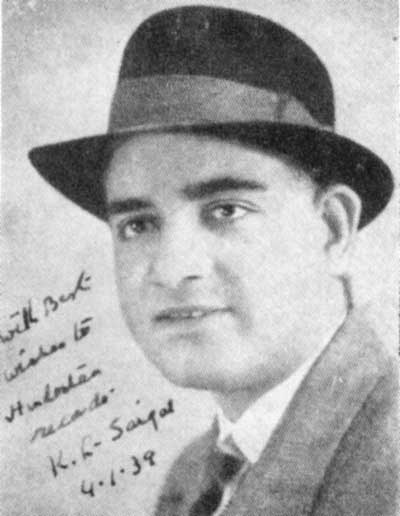
Publicity Photo of Kundan Lal Saigal

K. L. Saigal (11 April 1904 – 18 January 1947) was an Indian playback singer and actor who acted but also sang in Hindi and Bengali films and was active from 1932 to 1947. He is cited as the first "superstar" of Indian Cinema with films like President, Devdas and Street Singer leaving an impact on Hindi film music. He sang a total of 185 songs which included film, non-film, ghazals, Hindi/Urdu, Bengali, Punjabi, Tamil and Persian songs. However, only 170 songs still survive. Saigal was introduced to B. N. Sircar by R. C. Boral and Pankaj Mullick, who had met him at an impromptu evening singing session. Sircar cast Saigal in his debut role as the main lead in Mohabbat Ke Ansu (1932). The same year he acted in Zinda Lash (1932), and Subah Ka Sitara (1932), both films were produced by Sircar's New Theatres Ltd. Calcutta and directed by Premankur Atorthy.

Saigal's earliest recorded song is "Jhulana Jhulao Ri" in Dev Ghandharva Raga for Hindustan Records. In Yahudi Ki Ladki (1933) Saigal's singing of Ghalib's ghazal "Nuktacheen Hai Ghame Dil" composed by Pankaj Mullick in Raga Bhimpalasi, is considered a classic rendition. Chandidas (1934) was New Theatres first big success with the song "Prem Nagar Mein Banaoongi Ghar Main" becoming popular.

In 1935, Saigal acted in the Hindi version of P. C. Barua's Devdas (1935) in the title role. The film, with its songs "Baalam Aaye Baso Morey Man Mein" and "Dukh Ke Ab Din Beetat Nahin" sung by Saigal, is cited as a "milestone" in Indian cinema, and made Saigal, New Theatres first superstar. The song "Piye Ja Aur Piye Ja" from Pujarin (1936) was recorded without any rehearsal. Composed in Raga Khamaj with a mix of waltz and western orchestra, the song "enchanted listeners". "President" (1937), cited as Saigal's finest film had one of his "memorable" songs "Ik Bangla Bane Nyara". Songs like "Babul Mora Naihar Chhooto Hi Jaaye" from Street Singer (1938), "Karun Kya Aas Niras Bhai" from Dushman (1939), "Soja Rajkumari Soja from Zindagi (1940), "Diya Jalao" from Tansen (1943), "Gham Diye Mustakil" from ShahJahan (1946), and bhajans like "Madhukar Shyam hamare chor", "Sar Par Kadamb Ki Chhaiyan" (Raag Bhairavi), "Maiya Mori Main Nahi Maakhan Khayo" from Bhakta Surdas (1942), cited as "unforgettable bhajans" affirmed him as "an immortal singer".

== Hindi Film Songs ==
He is one of the best-known and most respected playback singers in India.

Key
†	Denotes films that have no record of K. L. Saigal songs

Film	Song	Composer	Lyricist	Director	ref
Mohabbat Ke Ansu (1932) †		R. C. Boral		Premankur Atorthy	
Zinda Lash (1932) †		R. C. Boral		Premankur Atorthy	
Subah Ka Sitara (1932) †		R. C. Boral		Premankur Atorthy	
Yahudi Ki Ladki (1933)	"Ye Tasarruf Allah Allah Tere Maikhane Mein Hai"	Pankaj Mullick	Agha Hashar Kashmiri	Premankur Atorthy	
Yahudi Ki Ladki (1933)	"Lag Gayi Chot Karejwa Mein"	Pankaj Mullick	Agha Hashar Kashmiri		
Yahudi Ki Ladki (1933)	"Lakh Sahi Hain Pi Ki Batiyan"	Pankaj Mullick	Agha Hashar Kashmiri		
Yahudi Ki Ladki (1933)	"Nuktacheen Hai Ghame-Dil"	Pankaj Mullick	Mirza Ghalib		
Puran Bhagat (1933)	"Din Neeke Beete Jaate Hain"	R. C. Boral		Debaki Bose	
Puran Bhagat (1933)	"Avsar Beeto Jaat Praani"	R. C. Boral			
Puran Bhagat (1933)	"Radhe Rani De Daaro Na Bansari Mori Re"	R. C. Boral			
Puran Bhagat (1933)	"Bhaju Main To Bhaav Se Shiri Giridhari"	R. C. Boral			
Rajrani Meera (1933) †		R. C. Boral		Debaki Bose	
Dulari Bibi (1933) †		R. C. Boral		Debaki Bose	
Chandidas (1934)	"Tadpat Beete Din Rain"	R. C. Boral	Agha Hashar Kashmiri	Nitin Bose	
Chandidas (1934)	"Prem Ki Ho Jai Jai" (with Pahari Sanyal, Uma Shashi)	R. C. Boral			
Chandidas (1934)	"Prem Ka Pujari"	R. C. Boral			
Daku Mansoor (1934) †		R. C. Boral		Nitin Bose	
Mohabbat Ki Kasauti (1934) †		R. C. Boral	Bani Kumar	P. C. Barua	
Karwan-E-Hayat (1934)	"Dil Se Teri Nigah"	R. C. Boral, Mihir Kiran Bhattacharya	Ahmad Shuja Pasha	Premankur Atorthy	
Karwan-E-Hayat (1934)	"Hairat -E- Nazar Aakhir"	R. C. Boral, M. K. Bhattacharya	Ahmad Shuja Pasha		
Karwan-E-Hayat (1934)	"Koi Preet Ki Reet Bata De" with Pahari Sanyal	R. C. Boral, M. K. Bhattacharya	Ahmad Shuja Pasha		
Karwan-E-Hayat (1934)	"Shehron Mein Wo Baat Kahaan"	R. C. Boral, M. K. Bhattacharya	Ahmad Shuja Pasha		
Devdas (1935)	"Baalam Aaye Baso Morey Man Mein"	R. C. Boral	Kidar Sharma	P. C. Barua	
Devdas (1935)	"Dukh Ke Ab Din Beetat Nahin"	R. C. Boral	Kidar Sharma		
Devdas (1935)	"Piya Bin Na Aawat Chain"	R. C. Boral	Kidar Sharma		
Pujarin (1936)	"Jo Beet Chuki So Beet Chuki"	Timir Baran	Kidar Sharma	Prafulla Roy	
Pujarin (1936)	"Piye Ja Aur piye Ja Akbat Ki Baatein Jaane Koi Kya"	Timir Baran	Kidar Sharma		
Karodpati (1936)	"O Dilruba Kahaan Tak Zulm-O-Sitam Sahenge" (with Pahari Sanyal)	R. C. Boral, Pankaj Mullick	Kidar Sharma	Hemchander Chunder	
Karodpati (1936)	"Jo Naukri Dila De B. A. Bananewale Bigdi Hui Bana De" with Sanyal	Boral, Mullick	Kidar Sharma		
Karodpati (1936)	"Jagat Mein Prem Hi Prem Bhara Hai" with Sanyal	Boral, Mullick	Kidar Sharma		
Karodpati (1936)	"Jagat Mein Prem Hi Prem Bhara Hai"	Boral, Mullick	Kidar Sharma		
Dushman (1939)	"Karoon Kya Aas Niraas Bhayi"	Pankaj Mullick	Arzu Lucknawi	Nitin Bose	
Dushman (1939)	"Preet Mein Hai Jeevan Jokhum"	Pankaj Mullick	Arzu Lucknawi		
Dushman (1939)	"Pyari Pyari Soorto"	Pankaj Mullick	Arzu Lucknawi		
Dushman (1939)	"Sitam Thay Zulm Thay Aafat Thay"	Pankaj Mullick	Arzu Lucknawi		
Zindagi (1940)	"Hey Diwana Hoon, Diwana Hoon"	Pankaj Mullick	Kidar Sharma	P. C. Barua	
Zindagi (1940)	"Jeevan Asha Ye Hai Meri"	Pankaj Mullick	Arzu Lucknawi		
Zindagi (1940)	"Main Kya Jaanu Kya Jaadu Hai"	Pankaj Mullick	Kidar Sharma		
Zindagi (1940)	"So Ja Rajkumari So Ja"	Pankaj Mullick	Kidar Sharma		
Lagan (1941)	"Kaise Katein Ratiyaan Balam"	R. C. Boral	Arzu Lucknawi	Nitin Bose	
Lagan (1941)	"Kaahe Ko Raad Machayi"	R. C. Boral	Arzu Lucknawi		
Lagan (1941)	"Koi Manushya Kitna Hi Bura Ho"	R. C. Boral	Arzu Lucknawi		
Lagan (1941)	"Main Sote Bhaag Jaga Doonga"	R. C. Boral	Arzu Lucknawi		
Lagan (1941)	"Ye Kaisa Anyaya Daata"	R. C. Boral	Arzu Lucknawi		
Lagan (1941)	"Hatt Gayi Lo Kaari Ghata"	R. C. Boral	Arzu Lucknawi		
Bhakta Surdas (1942)	"Madhukar Shyam Hamare Chor"	Gyan Dutt	D. N. Madhok	Chaturbhuj Doshi	
Bhakta Surdas (1942)	"Kadam Chale Aage, Mann Paachhe Bhaage"	Gyan Dutt	D. N. Madhok		
Bhakta Surdas (1942)	"Nisdin Barsat Nain Hamaare"	Gyan Dutt	D. N. Madhok		
Bhakta Surdas (1942)	"Nainheen Ko Raah Dikha Prabhu"	Gyan Dutt	D. N. Madhok		
Bhakta Surdas (1942)	"Manwa Krishna Naam Ratt Ga"	Gyan Dutt	D. N. Madhok		
Bhakta Surdas (1942)	"Rain Gayi Ab Huva Savera"	Gyan Dutt	D. N. Madhok		
Bhakta Surdas (1942)	"Maiya Mori Main Nahin Maakhan Khaayo"	Gyan Dutt	D. N. Madhok		
Bhakta Surdas (1942)	"Chandni Raat Aur Taare Khile Hon" (with Khursheed)	Gyan Dutt	D. N. Madhok		
Bhakta Surdas (1942)	"Din Se Dugni Ho Jaayein Ratiyan"	Gyan Dutt	D. N. Madhok		
Bhakta Surdas (1942)	"Jis Jogi Ka Jog Liya"	Gyan Dutt	D. N. Madhok		
Bhakta Surdas (1942)	"Sar Pe Kadamb Ki Chhaiya" (with Rajkumari)	Gyan Dutt	D. N. Madhok		
Tansen (1943)	"Kaahe Gumaan Kare Ri Gori"	Khemchand Prakash	Pandit Indra	Jayant Desai	
Tansen (1943)	"Baag Laga Doon Sajni"	Khemchand Prakash	Pandit Indra		
Tansen (1943)	"Sapt Suran Teen Graam Gaavo"	Khemchand Prakash	Pandit Indra		
Tansen (1943)	"Din Soona Deepak Bina"	Khemchand Prakash	Pandit Indra		
Tansen (1943)	"Bina Pankh Panchhi Hoon Main"	Khemchand Prakash	Pandit Indra		
Tansen (1943)	"More Baalapan Ke Sathi"	Khemchand Prakash	Pandit Indra		
Tansen (1943)	"Rumjhum Rumjhum Chaal Tihaari"	Khemchand Prakash	Pandit Indra		
Meri Bahen (My Sister) (1944)	"Chhupo Na Chhupo Na Pyari Sajaniya"	Pankaj Mullick	Pandit Bhushan	Hemchandra Chunder	
Meri Bahen (My Sister) (1944)	"Do Naina Matware Tihare"	Pankaj Mullick	Pandit Bhushan		
Meri Bahen (My Sister) (1944)	"Ae Qaatib-E-Taqdeer Mujhe"	Pankaj Mullick	Pandit Bhushan		
Meri Bahen (My Sister) (1944)	"Haaye Kis But Ki Mohabbat Mein"	Pankaj Mullick	Pandit Bhushan		
Bhanwara (1944)	"Kya Hamne Bigada Hai" (with Amirbai Karnataki)	Khemchand Prakash	Kidar Sharma	Kidar Sharma	
Bhanwara (1944)	"Diya Jisne Dil Lut Gaya Wo Bechara"	Khemchand Prakash	Kidar Sharma		
Bhanwara (1944)	"Ye Woh Jagah Hai Jahaan Ghar Lutaaye Jaate Hain"	Khemchand Prakash	Kidar Sharma		
Bhanwara (1944)	"Muskurate Huye Yun Aankh Churaya Na Karo"	Khemchand Prakash	Kidar Sharma		
Bhanwara (1944)	"Hum Apna Unhein Bana Na Sake"	Khemchand Prakash	Kidar Sharma		
Bhanwara (1944)	"Thukra Rahi Hai Duniya"	Khemchand Prakash	Kidar Sharma		
Kurukshetra (1945)	"Aayi Hai Tu Toh Kaise Dil Apna Dikhaun Main"	Ganpat Rao	Jameel Mazhari	Rameshwar Sharma	
Kurukshetra (1945)	"Tu Aa Gayi, Dil Ki Tamanna Jaag Uthi"	Ganpat Rao	Jameel Mazhari		
Kurukshetra (1945)	"Kidhar Hai Tu Ae Meri Tamanna"	Ganpat Rao	Jameel Mazhari		
Kurukshetra (1945)	"Mohabbat Ke Gul Hain Haaye Tar Goondhta Hoon"	Ganpat Rao	Jameel Mazhari		
Tadbir (1945)	"Chaahe Tu Mita De"	Lal Mohammed	Swami Ramanand Saraswati	Jayant Desai	
Tadbir (1945)	"Hasratein Khamosh Hain Aur Aah Batasir Hai"	Lal Mohammed	Swami Ramanand Saraswati		
Tadbir (1945)	"Main Qismat Ka Mara Bhagwan"	Lal Mohammed	Swami Ramanand Saraswati		
Tadbir (1945)	"Rani Khol De Apne Dwar" (with Suraiya)	Lal Mohammed	Swami Ramanand Saraswati		
Tadbir (1945)	"Main Panchhi Azad"	Lal Mohammed	Swami Ramanand Saraswati		
Tadbir (1945)	"Janam Janam Ka Dukhiya Prani"	Lal Mohammed	Swami Ramanand Saraswati		
Omar Khaiyyam (1946)	"Insaan, Kyun Rota Hai Insan"	Lal Mohammed	Safdar Aah Sitapuri	Mohan Sinha	
Omar Khaiyyam (1946)	"Hare Bhare Bagh Ke Phoolon Pe Rija Khayyam"	Lal Mohammed	Safdar Aah Sitapuri		
Omar Khaiyyam (1946)	"Allah Hu Allah Hu"	Lal Mohammed	Safdar Aah Sitapuri		
Shahjehan (1946)	"Mere Sapnon Ki Rani"	Naushad	Majrooh Sultanpuri	Abdul Rashid Kardar	
Shahjehan (1946)	"Kar Leejiye Chal Kar Meri Jannat Ke Nazare"	Naushad	Majrooh Sultanpuri		
Shahjehan (1946)	"Ae Dil-e-Beqarar Jhoom"	Naushad	Khumar Barabankvi		
Shahjehan (1946)	"Chaah Barbad Karegi Hamein Maaloom Na Tha"	Naushad	Khumar Barabankvi		
Shahjehan (1946)	"Gham Diye Mustaqil"	Naushad	Majrooh Sultanpuri		
Shahjehan (1946)	"Jab Dil Hi Toot Gaya"	Naushad	Majrooh Sultanpuri		
Parwana (1947)	"Us Mast Nazar Pe Padi Jo Nazar"	Khurshid Anwar	D. N. Madhok	J. K. Nanda	
Parwana (1947)	"Mohabbat Mein Kabhi Aisi Bhi Haalat Pai Jaati Hai"	Khurshid Anwar	D. N. Madhok, Naqshab		
Parwana (1947)	"Ae Phool Hanske Bagh Mein"	Khurshid Anwar	D. N. Madhok		
Parwana (1947)	"Toot Gaye Sab Sapne Mere"	Khurshid Anwar	D. N. Madhok, Naqshab and Tanvir Naqvi		
Parwana (1947)	"Jine Ka Dhang Sikhaaye Ja"	Khurshid Anwar	D. N. Madhok		

== Bengali Songs ==
Film	Song	Composer	Lyricist	Director	ref
Devdas (1935)	"Golap Hoye Uthuk Phutey"	Timir Baran, R. C. Boral, Pankaj Mullick		P. C. Barua	
Devdas (1935)	"Kaharey Je Joratey Chaye"				
Bijoya (1936)	"Mone-pabaner Dinga Baiya Bandhur Desey Ja"				
Didi (1937)	"Raajaar Kumaar Pakshiraaje"	R. C. Boral, Pankaj Mullick	Ajoy Bhattacharya	Nitin Bose	
Didi (1937)	"Swapan Dekhi Probaal Dwipe"	R. C. Boral, Pankaj Mullick	Ajoy Bhattacharya		
Didi (1937)	"Prem Nahe More Mridu"	R. C. Boral, Pankaj Mullick	Ajoy Bhattacharya		
Didi (1937)	"Premer Pujaaye Eyito Labhili Phal"	R. C. Boral, Pankaj Mullick	Ajoy Bhattacharya		
Desher Mati (1938)	"Baandhinu Michhe Ghar Bhulero"	Pankaj Mullick		Nitin Bose	
Sathi	"Jhumar Jhumar Nupur Baaje"	R. C. Boral	Ajoy Bhattacharya	Phani Majumdar	
Sathi	"Ae Gaan Tomaar Sheesh"	R. C. Boral	Ajoy Bhattacharya		
Jiban Maran	"Ami Tomay Jato Shuniyechhilem"	Pankaj Mullick	Rabindrasangeet	Nitin Bose	
Jiban Maran	"Yi Peyechhi Anala Jaalaa Taare Shudhu Chai"	Pankaj Mullick	Ajoy Bhattacharya		
Jiban Maran	"Paakhi Aaj Kon Katha Koy Shunish Kirey"	Pankaj Mullick	Ajoy Bhattacharya		
Jiban Maran	"Shuni Daakey Morey"	Pankaj Mullick	Ajoy Bhattacharya		
Jiban Maran	"Tomar Binaye Gaan Chhilo Aar Aamar"	Pankaj Mullick	Rabindrasangeet		
Non-film	Jakhan Rabona Ami Din Holey Aboshan				
Non-film	"Ek Tuku Chhoa Laage"		Rabindrasangeet		

== Non-film Songs ==
Type	Song	Lyricist	ref
Ghazal	"Aah Ko Chaahiye Ik Umr Asar Hone Tak"	Ghalib	
Ghazal	"Dil Se Teri Nigah Jigar Tak Utar Gayi"	Ghalib	
Ghazal	"Ishq Mujhko Nahin Wahshat Hi Sahi"	Ghalib	
Ghazal	"Har Ek Baat Pe Kehte Ho Tum Ke Tu Kya Hai"	Ghalib	
Ghazal	"Ibne Mariyam Hua Kare Koi"	Ghalib	
Ghazal	"Phir Mujhe Deeda-E-Tar Yaad Aaya"	Ghalib	
Ghazal	"Woh Aa Ke Kwab Mein Taskin-E-Iztaraab Toh De"	Ghalib	
Ghazal	"Shama Ka Jalna Hai Ya Sozshe-Parwana Hai"	Kidar Sharma	
Ghazal	"Ab Kya Bataun Main Tere Milne Se Kya Mila"	Seemab Akbarabadi	
Ghazal	"Ae Bekhabari Dil Ko Deewana Bana Dena"	Seemab Akbarabadi	
Ghazal	"Baqadr-E-Shauq Iqrar-E-Wafa Kya"	Seemab Akbarabadi	
Ghazal	"Duniya Mein Hoon Duniya Ka Talabgaar Nahin Hoon"	Seemab Akbarabadi	
Ghazal	"Ishq Khud Maile-Hijaab Hai Aaj"	Seemab Akbarabadi	
Ghazal	"Jaag Aur Dekh Zara Alam-E-Veeraan Mera"	Seemab Akbarabadi	
Ghazal	"Jalvagaah-E-Dil Men Marate Hi Andhera Ho Gaya"	Seemab Akbarabadi	
Ghazal	"Ghamza Paikan Hua Jaata Hai"	Bedam	
Ghazal	"Layi Hayaat Aaye Qaza Le Chali Chale"	Zauq	
Ghazal	"Apni Hasti Ka Asar Khushnamaya Ho Jaaye"	NA	
Ghazal	"Bahut Uss Gali Ke Kiye Hain Re Phere"	NA	
Ghazal	"Ghar Ye Tera Sada Na Mera Hai"	NA	
Ghazal	"Idhar Phir Bhi Aana Udhar Jaane Waale"	NA	
Ghazal	"Kaun Virane Mein Dekhega Bahar"		
Ghazal	"Rehmat Pe Teri Mere Gunahon Ko Naaz Hai"	NA	
Ghazal	"Shukriya Hasti Ka Lekin Tumne Ye Kya Kar Diya"	NA	
Ghazal	"Woh Aake Khwab Mein Taskeen-E-Iztiraab Toh De"	NA	
Bhajan	"Suno Suno Hey Krishna Kala		
Bhajan	"Hari Bin Koi Kaam Na Aayo"		
Bhajan	"Kaun Bujhave Ram Tapat More Mann Ki Ho Rama"		
Bhajan	"Jin Jao Ri Gori Paniya Bharan"		
Bhajan	"Main Jo Dinan Ki Thhori"		
Bhajan	"Hori O Brajraj Dulare"		
Bhajan	"Radhe Rani Daro Na Bansuri Bole"		
Bhajan	"Main To Dinan Ki Chhori"		
Geet/Song	"Main Baithi Thi Phulwari Mein"	K. L. Saigal	
Geet/Song	"Humjoliyon Ki Thi Toliyaan"	K. L. Saigal	
Geet/Song	"Jhulna Jhulao"		
Geet/Song	"Kete Din Aur Kete Din"		
Geet/Song	"Panchhi Kaahe Hot Udas"	D. N. Madhok	
Punjabi	Mahi Naal Je Akh Lad Di Kadi Na		
Punjabi	O Sohne Saqiya Meri Gali Vi Phera Paunda Ja		
Persian	"Mara Ba Ghamza"		
Persian	"Rangeen Tar Az Henhast"		
Tamil (film:Devdaasa 1936)	"Koodiye Paaduvai Komala Kiliye"		
Tamil (film:Devdaasa 1936)	"Madan Yevum Kanaiyal Maha Moham"		

== Notes ==
- Raghava R. Menon "The Pilgrim of the Swara" Clarion Books (1978)
- K. L. Saigal (29 January 2015). Hits of K. L. Saigal Vol 3 (CD). India: Induna.
- K. L. Saigal (30 January 2015). K.L. Saigal's Memorable Film Songs, Ghazals And Geets Vol 1-4 (CD). India: Times Music.
- All of the currently available 172 songs of K. L. Saigal, from films and others are here "All Saigal Songs by S. Madani"
