= Kumar (actor) =

Indian actor and filmmaker

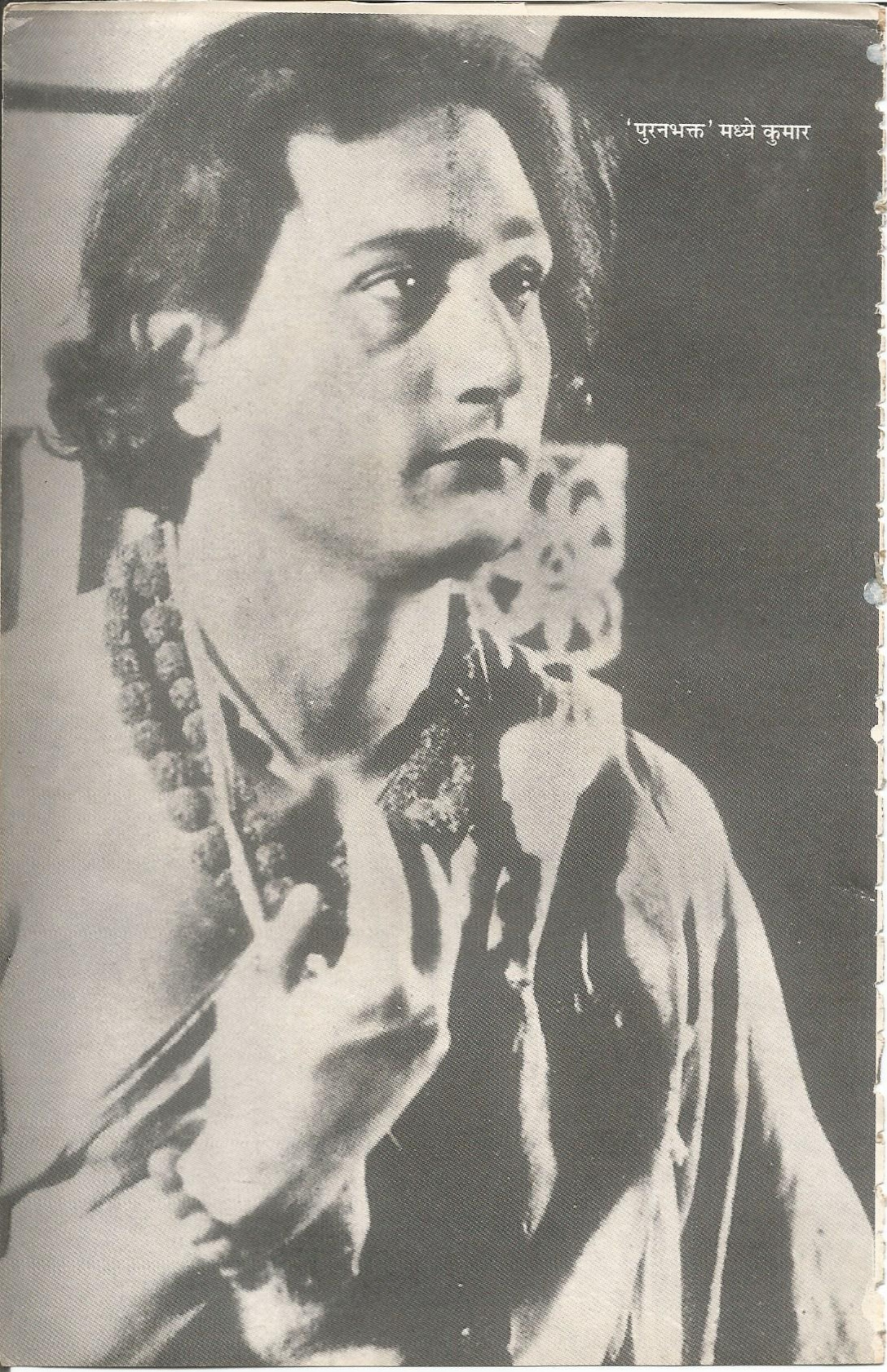
- Kumar in Puran Bhagat (1933)
- Born: Syed Ali Hasan Zaidi; 23 September 1906; Lucknow, United Provinces of Agra and Oudh, British India
- Died: 4 June 1982 (aged 75); Pakistan
- Other names: M. Kumar; Ali Meer; Mir Mujjin
- Occupations: Actor; Film producer
- Spouse: Pramila (m. 1939)
- Children: at least 6 (including Haidar Ali)

Kumar (born Syed Ali Hasan Zaidi; 23 September 1906 – 4 June 1982), alternatively known as M. Kumar, was an Indian film producer and actor, who played character roles in Hindi cinema from early 1930s to early 1960s. He migrated to Pakistan in 1963.

== Personal life ==
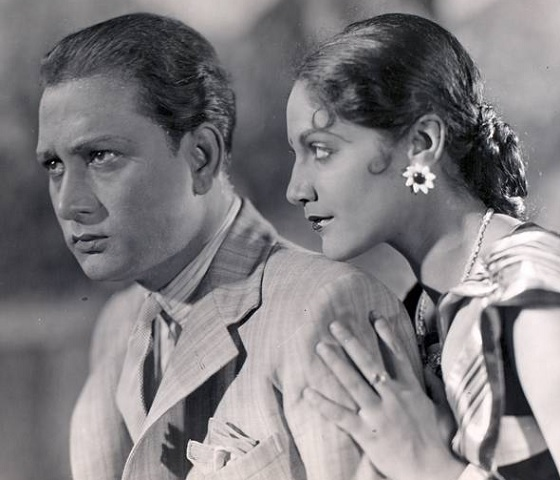
Kumar with his wife Pramila in Humari Betiyan (1936)

Kumar was born in an affluent family of Lucknow on 23 September 1906 and was fondly called "Mir Mujjan" at home. In 1939, Kumar married Jewish actress Esther Victoria Abraham popularly known as Pramila, who later went on to become the first Miss India in 1947. Before marrying her, Kumar already had a wife and children in Lucknow. In 1963, on the insistence of his extended family, Kumar left for Pakistan, much to the displeasure of his second wife, who decided to stay back in India. Like his wife, his daughter Naqi Jahan also became Miss India in 1967. Not much is known about the final decade of his life. Kumar died on 4 June 1982 aged 78.

== Career ==
Kumar began his acting career in the early 1930s. Until 1933, Kumar used the name "Ali Meer" for working in films. Some of his earliest works include Zinda Lash and Subah Ka Sitara both of which released in 1932 and starred K. L. Saigal in lead role. In 1933, director Debaki Bose of New Theatres made the film Puran Bhagat which starred Kumar as the leading man. The film was based on a popular Punjabi devotional story of Puran Bhagat. Following the riots of 1933 which was due to a dispute between Sikhs and Muslims at the Shaheed Ganj Mosque in Lahore, Bose rechristined Ali Meer as Kumar, as he feared of backlash the film might receive with the leading man, who's actually a Muslim, playing a Sikh character. Nevertheless, the film received critical and commercial success and established Kumar.

Kumar with Sitara in Watan (1938)

Throughout the 1930s and 1940s, Kumar continued to appear in a string of films which included Yahudi Ki Ladki (1933), Dharam Patni (1935), Al Hilal (1935), Humari Betiyan (1936), Watan (1938), Nadi Kinare (1939), Taj Mahal (1941), Sohagan (1942), Naseeb (1945), Duhai (1943), Dasi Aur Ma (1945), Dharma (1945), Bairam Khan (1945) and Nek Pervin (1946). While reviewing Nek Pervin editor Baburao Patel of Filmindia complimented Kumar's acting prowess and diction. Kumar also gave music for the film Hatimtai (1946).

In 1942, Kumar in partnership with Chandra Mohan founded his production house – Silver Films. Some of the films produced included Jhankar (1942), Bhalai (1943), Bade Nawab Saheb (1944), Naseeb (1945) and Devar (1946). In addition to that, he even directed a few films like Dhoon which starred Raj Kapoor and Nargis and Bahana (that he also produced) which starred Meena Kumari in lead roles.

Throughout the late 1940s to early 1960s, he continued having sporadic appearances in films like Mahal (1949), Tarana (1951), Shree 420 (1955), Sohni Mahiwal (1958), Dil Apna Aur Preet Parai (1960) and Jhumroo (1961). His most memorable performance came with Mughal-e-Azam (1960), in which he essayed the role of Sangtarash, a sculptor who acts as a catalyst in bringing Salim and Anarkali closer. The song "Ae Mohobbat Zindabad" from the film, was picturized on Kumar.

After migrating to Pakistan in 1963, Kumar continued his career with films like Tauba (1964), which became a grand success, Head Constable (1964), Azad, Shabnam, Naela, Saiqa, Sajda (his own film), Hum Dono, Nadya Ke Paar, Ik Musafir Ek Hasina, Baalam and Pakeeza (1968) before retiring from films.

== Selected filmography ==
- Zinda Lash
- Subah Ka Sitara
- Puran Bhagat
- Yahudi Ki Ladki
- Dharam Patni
- Al Hilal
- Humari Betiyan
- Watan
- Nadi Kinare
- Taj Mahal
- Sohagan
- Naseeb
- Duhai
- Dasi Aur Ma
- Dharma
- Bairam Khan
- Devar
- Nek Pervin
- Anokhi Mohabbat
- Shehar Ka Jadoo
- Sachcha Sapna
- Maan
- Suhaag
- Shree 420
- Dil Apna Aur Preet Parai
- Jhumroo
- Chhoti Chhoti Baatein
- Sarala
- Doosri Shaadi
- Devar
- Najma
- Thokar
- Abhilasha
- Gul Bahar
- Majboori
- Abidah
- Daaera
- Tarana
- Badal Aur Bijli
- Qaidi
- Malik
- Mehndi
- Hum Bhi Insaan Hain
- Kya Ye Bombai Hai
- Lal Quila
- Sohni Mahiwal
- Mughal-e-Azam
- Tauba
- Head Constable
- Azad
- Shabnam
- Naela
- Saiqa
- Sajda
- Hum Dono
- Nadya Ke Paar
- Ik Musafir Ek Hasina
- Baalam
- Pakeeza
- Dhoon
- Bahana
