= List of Hindi films of 1932 =

A list of films produced by the Hindi film industry based in Mumbai in 1932:

== A-B ==
| Title | Director | Cast | Genre | Notes |
|---|---|---|---|---|
| Alibaba And Forty Thieves | J. J. Madan | Jehanara Kajjan, Patience Cooper, Mohammed Nawab, Mukhtar Begum, Sorabji Kerawala | Fantasy | Madan Theatres Ltd. |
| Ankh Ka Tara | Jyotish Bannerjee | Jehanara Kajjan, Indubala, Narmada Shankar, Champalal, Chanda, Laxmi | Social | Madan Theatres Ltd. Music: Motilal Nayak |
| Ayodhya Ka Raja | | Durga Khote, Govindra Tembe, Master Vinayak, Baburao Pendharkar, Kumar Digambar, Buwa Saheb, Ebrahim, Shankar Rao Bhosle, Nimbalkar | Religious | Prabhat Film Company. Music: Govindrao Tembe |
| Bhakta Prahlad | Kanjibhai Rathod | Haidar Shah, Neelam, Chandrarao | Devotional | Vishnu Pictures. |
| Bharati Mata | Pesi Karani | Zohrajan, Khalil, Mushtari, Jilloobai, Dinkar, Hadi, Jamshedji | | Imperial Film Company Music: Pransukh Nayak; Lyrics: |
| Bhartruhari | A. P. Kapoor | Zebunissa, Tarabai, Ashraf Khan, Miss Iqbal, Chandera Rao, Zahiruddin, Kasim Ali | Legend | Saroj Movietone. Music: Sunderdas Bhatia, Damodardas; Lyrics: |
| Bhasmasur Mohini | Kanjibhai Rathod | Lakshmi | Mythology | Bharat Movietone. |
| Bhutia Mahal | Jayant Desai | E. Billimoria, Kamla Devi, Ishwarlal, Dixit, Shanta Devi, Ghory, Keki Adjania | Suspense | Ranjit Film Company. Music: Lyrics: |
| Bilwamangal | Fram Madan | Master Nissar, Jehanara Kajjan, Patience Cooper, Nawab, Sharifa, Mohamed Ishaq, A. R. Kabuli | Devotional Biopic | Madan Theatres Ltd. Music: Brijlal Varma |
| Bishnu Maya | Jyotish Banerjee | Ahindra Choudhury, Kanan Devi, Uma Sashi Dhiren Das, Bela Rani, Jaynarayan Mukhopadhyay, Renubala, Naresh Mitra, Shishubala | Religious | Madan Theatres Ltd. |
| Bulbul-E-Baghdad | Nanubhai Vakil | Yakub, Khatoon, Sudhir, Baburao, Dinkar, Master Bachchu, Sushila, Mehboob Khan | Fantasy | Sagar Movietone. |

== C-I ==
| Title | Director | Cast | Genre | Notes |
|---|---|---|---|---|
| Char Chakram | Jayant Desai | E. Billimoria, Shanta Kumari, Ishwarlal, Kamla Devi, Dixit, Ghory, Keki Adjania | Comedy | Ranjit Film Company. Music: Jhande Khan; Lyrics: |
| Chatra Bakavali | J.J. Madan | Master Nissar, Jehanara Kajjan, Patience Cooper, Valatoo, Mukhtar Begum, A. R. Kabuli, Shaihla | Fantasy | Madan Theatres Ltd., Bharat Laxmi. Music: Nagardas Nayak |
| Chira Kumari | Amar Choudhary | Amar Choudhary, Rani, Dundari, Radharani, Kshirgopal Mukhopadhyay | | Madan Theatres. |
| Dagabaz Ashiq | Pesi Karani | Prithviraj Kapoor, Zohrajan, Mushtari, Baldev Singh, Rustam Poonawala, Jamshedji Khansaheb | Costume | Imperial Film Company. Music: Firojshah Mistry; Lyrics: |
| Do Badmash | Jayant Desai | Shanta Kumari, Dixit, Ghory | Social | Ranjit Film Company. Music: Lyrics: Dhaniram Prem |
| Educated Wife | | Patience Cooper | Social | Madan Theatres Ltd. Music: Lyrics: |
| Gul Bakavali | A. P. Kapoor | Ashraf Khan, Zebunissa, Ranibala, Ghulam Moammed, Prabha Shankar, Najju Begum, Zahiruddin, Kasim Ali | Legend | Saroj Movietone |
| Gulru Zarina | J. J. Madan | Master Nissar, Jehanara Kajjan, A. R. Kabuli, Sorabji Kerawala | Fantasy | Madan Theatres Ltd. Music: Brijlal Varma; Lyrics: |
| Hathili Dulhan | J. J. Madan | Patience Cooper, Leela, Laxmi, Abbas, Shaila, Mukhtar Begum | Social | Madan Theatres Ltd. |
| Heer Ranjha | Abdul Rashid Kardar | Rafiq Ghaznavi, Shanta Kumari, Anwari, M. Esmail, Master Fakir | Legend Romance | Music: Rafiq Ghaznavi, B. R. Devdhar; Lyrics: |
| Hind Kesari | Homi Master | Padma, Sultan Alam, Inamdar | | Jayant Pictures. Silent Film |
| Hindustan | Sorabji Kerawala | Rose, Mukhtar Begum, Narbada Shankar | | Madan Theatres Ltd. Music: Nagar Das Nayak; Lyrics: Agha Hashar Kashmiri |
| Indrasabha | J. J. Madan | Master Nissar, Jehanara Kajjan, Mukhtar Begum, A. R. Kabuli, Violet Cooper, Sylvia Bell, Wilayat Hussain, Pearl, Bira Pahelwan | Fantasy | Madan Theatres Ltd. Music: Nagardas Nayak |

== J-M ==
| Title | Director | Cast | Genre | Notes |
|---|---|---|---|---|
| Jalim Jawani | B. P. Misra | Master Vithal, Ermeline, Jamshedji, Rustom Poonawala, Sakhu, Khansaheb, Hadi, | Costume | Imperial Film Company. |
| Jalti Nishani | V. Shantaram | Master Vinayak, Leela, Baburao Pendharkar, Kamla Devi, Shankarrao Bhosle, Gajanan Jagirdar, Nimbalkar, Budasaheb | Costume | Prabhat Film Company. Music: Govindrao Tembe |
| Khuda Dost | G. R. Sethi | Master Mohammed, Bibijan, Bala, Haridas | Costume | Bharat Movietone. Music: Master Mohammed; Lyrics: |
| Krishnavtar | K. Pritamlal, Maneklal Patel | Shanta Kumari, Haidar Shah, Das, Kashinath, Jyotsna, Bhole | Religious | Krishna Movies. Music: Keshavrao Bhole; Lyrics: |
| Laheri Lutaru a.k.a. Gay Bandit | R. N. Vaidya | Harishchandra Rao, Manjula, Sunita, Sardar Begum, Nirmala, Ghatwai, Ali Bahadur, H. More, Padma, K. Budhkar, Pawar, Manohar | Costume | Paramount Film Company. Silent Film. |
| Madhuri | R. S. Choudhary | Ghulam Mohammed, Sulochana (Ruby Myers), Hadi, Chandabai, Jamshedji, Khansaheb, Vinayakrao Patwardhan | Drama | Imperial Film Company. Music: Prasansukh Nayak |
| Maya Bazar | Nanubhai Vakil | Yakub, Khatoon, Sudhir Baburao, Dinkar, Master Bachchu | Mythological | Sagar Movietone. Music: S. P. Rane; Lyrics: |
| Maya Machhindra | V. Shantaram | Durga Khote, Master Vinayak, Baburao Pendharkar, Leela Chandragiri, Govindrao Tembe, Hirabai, Nimbalkar, Babu Purohit | Mythological | Prabhat Film Company. From the play Siddhasansar by Shankar Trivedi. Music: Govindrao Tembe |
| Meerabai | Ramnik Desai | Zubeida, Khatoon, Kamla, Sankatha Prasad, Jal | Devotional | Sagar Movietone. Music: S. P. Rane; Lyrics: |
| Mohabbat Ke Ansu | Premankur Atorthy | K. L. Saigal, Mahajabeen, Akthari Muradabadi, Ansari, Sadiq | Social | New Theatres. Music: R. C. Boral; Lyrics: |
| Muflis Ashiq | J. J. Madan | Vithaldas Panchotia, Mukhtar Begum, Shaila, Dhannubhai, Vilayat Hussain, Abbas | Social | Madan Theatres Ltd. Music: Nagar Das Nayak; Lyrics: |

== N-R ==
| Title | Director | Cast | Genre | Notes |
|---|---|---|---|---|
| Navachetan | G. R. Sethi | Kamla, Badri Prasad, Sushila, Haridas, Haidar Shah | Social | Krishna Music: Madhavlal Master; Lyrics: G. R. Sethi |
| Nek Abla | Rustom Poonawala | Mushtari, Ghulam Mohammed, Phirojshah Mistry, Jamshedji Khansaheb, Hadi | Social | Imperial Film Company. Music: Lyrics: |
| Niti Vijay | Moti Gidwani | Ghulam Mohammed, Zohrajan, Khalil, Mushtari, Jillobai, Hadi, Kamla | Costume | Imperial Film Company. |
| Pak Daman Raqasa | B. R. Oberoi | Mukhtar Ahmed, Najju Begum, Sajjad Sarwar | Social | Elephanta M Music: Lyrics: |
| Parwana | H. E. Khateeb | Padma, Nure Watan, Kamla Kumari, Ram Kunwar, Rahim, Allavally, Shubi, A. Isaq, Agha, Kesari Singh | | New Western India Film Company. Silent Film. |
| Pati Bhakti | | Patience Cooper, Master Mohan, Jahanara Kajjan, Rosy, Surajram, Narbada Shankar | Social | Madan Theatres Ltd. Music: Master Mohan |
| Pavitra Ganga | J. K. Nanda | Nalini Tarkhud, Nambiar, Hiralal, Inder | Social | Oriental Pictures. Music: Rafiq Ghaznavi |
| Prahlad | Priyanath Ganguly | Kanan Devi, Ahindra Choudhury, Niharbala, Jaynarayan Mukhopadhyay, Mrinalkanti Ghosh, Dhiren Das, Shanti Gupta, Kunjalal Chakraborty | Devotional | Madan Theatres Ltd. |
| Radha Rani | Chandulal Shah | E. Billimoria, Gohar Mamajiwala, Baburao Sansare, Keki Adjania, Bhagwandas | Costume | Ranjit Studios. Music: Jhande Khan; Lyrics: Narayan Prasad Betab |
| Radhe Shyam | A. P. Kapoor, R. L. Shorey | Master Mohan, Radha, Sunita Devi, D. N. Madhok, Gangaprasad Pathak, Phool Kumari, Jamuna, J. N. Dar | Religious | Kamla Movies. Music: Bannekhan, Nawabkhan; Lyrics:D. N. Madhok |
| Ras Vilas | Nagendra Majumdar | Gohar Karnataki, Mohini, Anant Damle, Panna, Athavale, Lallubhai, Hanumant Rao | Mythology | Sharda Movietone. Music: Lallubhai Nayak; Lyrics: |
| Roshanara | G. R. Sethi | Haidar Shah, Tarabai, Khan, Rafiq Ghaznavi | Costume | Bharat Movietone. Music: Master Mohammed |

== S-Z ==
| Title | Director | Cast | Genre | Notes |
|---|---|---|---|---|
| Sati Madalsa | B. P. Misra | D. Billimoria, Ermiline, Hadi | Mythology | Imperial Film Company. |
| Sati Savitri | Chandulal Shah | Gohar Mamajiwala, Tarabai, Kamla, Baburao Sansare, Zafar Khan, Keki Adjania, Ghory, Bhagwandas, Shanta | Mythology | Ranjit Studios. Music: Jhande Khan; Lyrics: Nrayan Prasad Betab |
| Sati Sone | Madanrai Vakil | Jamshedji, Mushtari, Boman Shah, Khansaheb, Jilloobai, Hadi, Mukunda | Mythology | Imperial Film Company. Music: Pransukh Nayak; Lyrics: |
| Sassi Punnu | S. R. Apte, Chimanlal Luhar | Baburao Apte, Shivrani Ghosh, Majid, Lobo, Nandram, Athavale, Majumdar, Bhagwandas, Himmatwala, Sushila | Legend Romance | Sharda Movietone. Music: B. R. Devdhar; Lyrics: Pandit Ugra |
| Sheil Bala | Chandulal Shah | Gohar Mamajiwala, Bhagwandas, Tarabai, Kamla, Baburao Sansare, Zafar Khan, Keki Adjania, Ghory, Shanta, Gangaprasad Pathak | Costume | Ranjit Studios. Music: Jhande Khan; Lyrics: |
| Shikari | Naval Gandhi | P. Jairaj, Sita Devi, Jagdish Sethi, Shahzadi, Jal Khambata, Lovji Lavangia, B. Khan, Udwadia | Social | Eastern Film Ltd. Music: B. R. Devdhar; Lyrics: Munshi Dil |
| Shravan Kumar | A. R. Kabuli | Yusuf Effendi, Panna, A. R. Kabuli, Mukhtar Begum | Mythology | Madan Theatres Ltd. Music: Nagar Das Nayak |
| Shyam Sunder | Bhal G. Pendharkar | Shahu Modak, Shanta Apte, Raja Sandow, [], Baburao Apte | Mythology | Music: Baburao Ketkar; Lyrics: Munshi Aziz |
| Subah Ka Sitara | Premankur Atorthy | K. L. Saigal, Rattanbai, Mazhar Khan, A. M. Shiraji, Sheela, Ansari, Siddiqui, Ali Mir | Costume | New Theatres. Music: R. C. Boral; Lyrics: Arzu Lucknavi |
| Subhadara Haran | Prafulla Ghosh | Zubeida, Master Bachchu, Yakub, Sankatha Prasad, Jal Merchant, Khatoon, Shivram | Mythological | Sagar Movietone. Music: Lyrics: |
| Toofan Mail | JBH Wadia | Yashwant Dave, Padma, Narayan Pai, Adi Patel, Manchi Thuthi, JBH Wadia | Action | Wadia Brothers. Silent film. |
| Vanarsena | Homi Master | Padma, Vasantrao Pahelwan, Inamdar | | Jayant Pictures. Silent film. |
| Vanraj Kesari | Harshadrai Mehta | Navinchandra, Padma, Vasant Bhandari, Baburao Apte, Bhim, Bhagwandas, Lobo | Action | Mehta Luhar Productions. Silent film. |
| Veer Kunal a.k.a. Son Of Ashoka | M. Bhavnani, G. Deware | Mubarak, Sunalini Devi, Mehtab, Ashraf Khan, Zahiruddin, Miss Iqbal, Zafar Khan | Historical Drama | Indian Art Production. Music: Lyrics: Munshi Abbas Ali |
| Zarina | Ezra Mir | Zubeida, Jal Merchant, Yakub, Baburao, Nayampally, Sanhatha Prasad, Charlie | Costume | Music: S. P. Rane; Lyrics: |
| Zinda Lash | Premankur Atorthy | K. L. Saigal, Mahajabeen, Rani, Bikram Kapoor, Ansari, Hafisji, Hamid, Siddiqui | Costume | New Theatres. Music: R. C. Boral; Lyrics: |
