= Subah Ka Sitara =

1932 Indian film by Premankur Atorthy

- Directed by: Premankur Atorthy
- Produced by: New Theatres
- Starring: K. L. Saigal; Rattan Bai; Mazhar Khan; Ali Mir Kumar
- Cinematography: Nitin Bose
- Music by: R. C. Boral
- Production company: New Theatres
- Release date: 1932
- Running time: 128 min
- Country: India
- Languages: Urdu; Hindi

Subah Ka Sitara is a 1932 Urdu/Hindi romantic costume film from India. It was directed by Premankur Atorthy for New Theatres Ltd. Calcutta. Subah Ka Sitara was the third of the three films with which K. L. Saigal started his acting career in 1932. The first was Mohabbat Ke Ansu and the second was Zinda Lash. Like the first two films, Saigal used the name Saigal Kashmiri in the credit roll of the film. The film starred K. L. Saigal, Rattanbai, Mazhar Khan, Ali Mir Kumar, Radhabai, and Siddiqui. The music was by R. C. Boral. This was also actor Kumar’s second film, the first being Zinda Lash with Saigal in the lead role. Kumar’s name appeared in the credit roll as Ali Mir and it was from his third film Puran Bhagat that he changed his screen name to "Kumar".

The story revolved around the son of a nobleman and a slave girl. Though the songs of K. L. Saigal and Rattanbai were well appreciated, the movie did not fare well at the box office.

== Cast ==
- K. L. Saigal
- Rattanbai
- Mazhar Khan
- Ali Mir Kumar,
- Radhabai
- A. M. Shiraji
- Sheela
- Ansari
- Siddiqui

== Songs ==
The music direction was by R. C. Boral.

=== Song list ===
- "Ab Dawa Dete Hain Woh Aur Na Dua Dete Hain"
- "Arzoo Itni Ha Ab mere Dil-e-nashaad Ki"
- "Iltaza khaalik Se yeh Hai"
- "Hat Jaiji Na Hamko Sataoji"
- "Asq Bahe Bahaa Kare"
- "Khuli Hain Botal Bhare Hain Sagar"
- "Khayal Kashh Woh Karte Apne Bismil Ka"
- "Na Saroor Hoon Na Khumar Hoon"
- "Na Hanste Hain Tere Qaidi"
