= 6th National Film Awards =

Indian ceremony celebrating cinema of 1958

- Awarded for: Best of Indian cinema in 1958
- Awarded by: Ministry of Information and Broadcasting
- Presented by: Rajendra Prasad (President of India)
- Presented on: 28 April 1959
- Site: Vigyan Bhavan, New Delhi
- Official website: dff.nic.in

Highlights
- Best Feature Film: Sagar Sangamey
- Most awards: • Jalsaghar • Sagar Sangamey • School Master (2)

The 6th National Film Awards, then known as State Awards for Films, presented by Ministry of Information and Broadcasting, India to felicitate the best of Indian Cinema released in the year 1958. Ceremony took place at Vigyan Bhavan, New Delhi on 28 April 1959 and awards were given by then President of India, Dr. Rajendra Prasad.

== Awards ==
Awards were divided into feature films and non-feature films.

President's Gold Medal for the All India Best Feature Film is now better known as National Film Award for Best Feature Film, whereas President's Gold Medal for the Best Documentary Film is analogous to today's National Film Award for Best Non-Feature Film. For children's films, Prime Minister's Gold Medal is now given as National Film Award for Best Children's Film. At the regional level, President's Silver Medal for Best Feature Film is now given as National Film Award for Best Feature Film in a particular language. Certificate of Merit in all the categories is discontinued over the years.

=== Feature films ===
Feature films were awarded at All India as well as regional level. For the 6th National Film Awards, in this category, two Bengali films Sagar Sangamey and Jalsaghar along with a Kannada film School Master won maximum number of awards (two), with Sagar Sangamey also winning the President's Gold Medal for the All India Best Feature Film. Following were the awards given:

==== All India Award ====
Following were the awards given in each category:

Award	Film	Language	Awardee(s)	Cash prize
President's Gold Medal for the All India Best Feature Film	Sagar Sangamey	Bengali	Producer: De Luxe Film Distributors	Gold Medal and ₹20,000
President's Gold Medal for the All India Best Feature Film	Sagar Sangamey	Bengali	Director: Debaki Bose	₹5,000
All India Certificate of Merit for the Second Best Feature Film	Jalsaghar	Bengali	Producer: Satyajit Ray	Certificate of Merit and ₹10,000
All India Certificate of Merit for the Second Best Feature Film	Jalsaghar	Bengali	Director: Satyajit Ray	₹2,500
All India Certificate of Merit for Third Best Feature film	School Master	Kannada	Producer: B. R. Panthulu	Certificate of Merit only
All India Certificate of Merit for Third Best Feature film	School Master	Kannada	Director: B. R. Panthulu	Certificate of Merit only
All India Certificate of Merit for Best Children's Film	Virsa and the Magic Doll	English	Producer: Little Cinema Pvt Ltd.	Certificate of Merit only
All India Certificate of Merit for Best Children's Film	Virsa and the Magic Doll	English	Director: Santi P. Chowdhury	Certificate of Merit only

==== Regional Award ====
The awards were given to the best films made in the regional languages of India. For 6th National Film Awards, President's Silver Medal for Best Feature Film was not given in Malayalam, Marathi and Tamil language; instead Certificate of Merit was awarded in each particular language.

Award	Film	Awardee(s)	
Award	Film	Producer	Director
Feature Films in Assamese
President's Silver Medal for Best Feature Film	Ronga Police	Kanak Ch. Sharma	Nip Barua
Feature Films in Bengali
President's Silver Medal for Best Feature Film in Bengali	Sagar Sangamey	De Luxe Film Distributors Ltd.	Debaki Bose
Certificate of Merit	Jalsaghar	Satyajit Ray	Satyajit Ray
Certificate of Merit	Daak Harkara	Agragami Productions	Agragami
Feature Films in Hindi
President's Silver Medal for Best Feature Film	Madhumati	Bimal Roy	Bimal Roy
Certificate of Merit	Lajwanti	Mohan Segal	Narendra Suri
Certificate of Merit	Karigar	Vasant Joglekar	Vasant Joglekar
Feature Films in Kannada
President's Silver Medal for Best Feature Film	School Master	B. R. Panthalu	B. R. Panthulu
Feature Films in Malayalam
Certificate of Merit	Nairu Pidicha Pulivalu	T. E. Vasudevan	P. Bhaskaran
Certificate of Merit	Randidangazhi	Neela Productions	P. Subramaniam
Feature Films in Marathi
Certificate of Merit	Dhakti Jaoo	Sarvashri Wamanrao Kulkarni	Anant Mane
Certificate of Merit	Dhakti Jaoo	Vishnupant Chavan	Anant Mane
Feature Films in Tamil
Certificate of Merit	Thanga Padhumai	Jupitor Pictures Pvt Ltd.	A. S. A. Samy
Certificate of Merit	Annaiyin Aanai	A. M. M. Ismayil	C. H. Narayana Moorthy
Feature Films in Telugu
President's Silver Medal for Best Feature Film	Pelli Naati Pramanalu	Jayanthi Pictures Pvt Ltd.	K. V. Reddy
Certificate of Merit	Mangalya Balam	Annapoorna Pictures	Adurthi Subba Rao

=== Non-Feature films ===
Non-feature film awards were given for the documentaries made in the country. Following were the awards given:

==== Documentaries ====
Award	Film	Language	Awardee(s)	Cash prize
President's Gold Medal for the Best Documentary Film	Radha Krishna	English	Producer: Films Division	Gold Medal and ₹4,000
President's Gold Medal for the Best Documentary Film	Radha Krishna	English	Director: J. S. Bhownagary	₹1,000
All India Certificate of Merit for the Second Best Documentary Film	The Story of Dr. Karve	English	Producer: Films Division	Certificate of Merit and ₹2,000
All India Certificate of Merit for the Second Best Documentary Film	The Story of Dr. Karve	English	Director: Neil Gokhale	₹500
All India Certificate of Merit for the Second Best Documentary Film	The Story of Dr. Karve	English	Director: Ram Gabale	₹500
All India Certificate of Merit for the Third Best Documentary Film	Call of the Mountains	Hindi	Producer: Films Division; Director: A. K. Chaudhuri	Certificate of Merit only

=== Awards not given ===
Following awards were not given as no film was found to be suitable for the award:

- Prime Minister's Gold Medal for the Best Children's Film
- President's Silver Medal for Best Feature Film in Marathi
- President's Silver Medal for Best Feature Film in Malayalam
- President's Silver Medal for Best Feature Film in Tamil
