= Dulari Bibi =

1933 film

- Directed by: Debaki Bose
- Produced by: New Theatres
- Starring: K. L. Saigal; Molina Devi; Mir Jan
- Cinematography: Nitin Bose
- Music by: R. C. Boral
- Production company: New Theatres
- Release date: 1933
- Country: India
- Language: Urdu

Dulari Bibi is a 1933 Hindi/Urdu comedy film. It was directed by Debaki Bose and produced by New Theatres Ltd. Calcutta. A short three-reel film, it centred on the story of Our Wives. The film starred K. L. Saigal, Molina Devi, Mir Jan and the music was composed by R. C. Boral. It was listening to K. L. Saigal in this film that Pahari Sanyal realised the uniqueness of Saigal's voice as heard through the microphone. He found it more effective, "sweeter", as compared to him singing live.

== Cast ==
- K. L. Saigal
- Molina Devi
- Mir Jan
