= Sagar Sangamey =

1959 Bengali film

- Directed by: Debaki Bose
- Written by: Debaki Bose; Premendra Mitra
- Starring: Bharti Debi, Manju Adhikary, Jahar Roy; Nitish Mukhopadhyay
- Cinematography: Bimal Mukherjee
- Edited by: Gobardhan Adhikari
- Music by: Rai Chand Boral, Shailen Roy (Lyrics)
- Release date: 15 April 1959
- Running time: 90 minutes
- Country: India
- Language: Bengali

Sagar Sangamey (Bengali: সাগর সঙ্গমে; English: The Holy Island) is a 1959 Bengali film directed by Debaki Bose. The film won the National Award for the Best Film and the Best Child Actress in 1959. The award was presented by the first President of India – Rajendra Prasad – and the then Prime Minister Jawaharlal Nehru. It was screened at the 9th Berlin International Film Festival.

== Cast ==
- Bharati Debi
- Manju Adhikary
- Jahar Roy
- Nitish Mukhopadhyay
- Sailen Gangopadhyay
- Tulsi Lahiri
- Manorama Debi
- Nibhanani Debi
- Master Bibhu
- Amar Pal
- Md. Israel

== Awards ==
National Film Awards

- 1959 – National Film Award for Best Feature Film
- 1959 – National Film Award for Best Feature Film in Bengali
- 1959 – National Award for Best Child Actress – Manju Adhikari

Berlin International Film Festival

- 1959 – Golden Bear – Nominated
