= Meri Bahen =

- Directed by: Hemchander Chunder
- Written by: Binoy Chatterjee
- Produced by: New Theatres
- Starring: K. L. Saigal; Sumitra Devi; Akhtar Jehan; Chandravati; Madan Puri
- Music by: Pankaj Mullick
- Release date: 1944
- Country: India
- Language: Hindi

Meri Bahen (also called My Sister) is a 1944 Hindi language film. It was the fourth highest-grossing Indian film of 1944. Produced by New Theatres, Ltd. Calcutta, and directed by Hemchander Chunder. It starred K. L. Saigal, Sumitra Devi, Akhtar Jehan, Chandrabati Devi, Nawab, and Tulsi Chakraborty. The music direction was by Pankaj Mullick with lyrics by Pandit Bhushan.

The film is cited as Saigal's best film at New Theatres technically. Set against the backdrop of World War II in Calcutta, it was the story of a schoolteacher and his young sister. The film followed his rise to fame as a singer and the changes in his relationships following a bomb-raid.

== Cast ==
- K. L. Saigal as Ramesh
- Sumitra Devi as Krishna
- Devi Mukherjee as Shankar, Ramesh's friend
- Akhtar Jehan as Bimala, Ramesh's sister
- Hiralal as a Naib, Munshi
- Chandravati Devi as Rekha, drama lead heroine
- Tulsi Chakraborty as Chaudhary
- Madan Puri as a doctor who treat Bimla in the hospital
- Nawab as drama company owner
- Devika Mukherjee as
- Tandon as
- Rajlaxmi Shorey as

== Soundtrack ==
The film had music composed by Pankaj Mullick, assisted by Biran Bal and Hiten Bannerji, with lyrics by Pandit Bhushan. The singers were K. L. Saigal, Pankaj, Rekha Mallick, Vimala, Ila Ghosh, and Utpala Sen. According to Vijay Ranchan, Pankaj had composed two versions of the song "Piya Milan Ko Jana" in Kapal Kundala (1939), directed by Phani Majumdar. Mullick used one version of the song in Meri Bahen in his and Ila Ghosh's voice.

=== Music ===
All music was composed by Pankaj Mullick.

#	Title	Singer(s)
1	"Main In Phoolon Ke Sang"	Vimala
2	"Do Naina Matware Tihare"	K. L. Saigal
3	"Chhupo Naa Chhupo Naa O Pyari Sajaniya"	K. L. Saigal
4	"Haay Kis But Ki Mohabbat Mein"	K. L. Saigal
5	"Ae Qatib-E-Taqdeer"	K. L. Saigal
6	"Suno Ek Hare Ped Ki Daali Par"	Rekha Mullick
7	"Jal Jaane Do Is Duniya Ko"	Utpala Sen
8	"Panchhi Kaahe Hota Udas"	K. L. Saigal
9	"Piya Milan Ko Jaana"	Pankaj Mullick, Ila Ghosh
