= Watan (film) =

- Sitara Devi and Kumar in Watan
- Directed by: Mehboob Khan
- Written by: Wajahat Mirza; Mehboob Khan
- Produced by: Sagar Movietone
- Starring: Kumar; Bibbo; Yakub; Sitara Devi
- Cinematography: Faredoon Irani
- Edited by: Shamsudin Qadri
- Music by: Anil Biswas
- Production company: Sagar Movietone
- Release date: 22 January 1938
- Running time: 168 minutes
- Country: India
- Language: Hindi-Urdu

Watan (transl. Homeland) is a 1938 Indian costume drama film directed by Mehboob Khan. Produced by Sagar Films (Sagar Movietone), the film had story by Mehboob Khan and Wajahat Mirza. The cast of the film included Kumar (Syed Ali Hasan Zaidi), Bibbo (Ishrat Sultana), Maya Banerjee, Yakub Lala, Sitara Devi and Kayam Ali. The story set in Central Asia, based on the De-Cossackization policy, involving the Bolsheviks and Cossacks with the Cossacks fight for independence which was a symbolic reference to the independence from British rule in India at that time. It also incorporated a romantic triangle involving Kumar, Bibbo and Sitara Devi.

The cinematographer, as for most Sagar films, was Faredoon Irani. Following the successful music of Manmohan (1936), Sagar Movietone retained Anil Biswas as the in-house music director, scoring music for Watan along with other releases of the time from the studio.

Sitara Devi, who started her career as a child actress with Sagar Movietone working with Mehboob, got her first role as a leading lady with Watan. She was adjudged, and received the best actress award, from the Gohar Gold Medal Committee, an award committee instituted by actress Gohar.

== Plot ==
In a fictionalised setting somewhere in Central Asia, the tyrannical Russian Tsar is committing atrocities against the Cossacks. General Murad is sympathetic towards the Cossacks and is arrested for his treachery. He manages to escape and meets Gulnar. Together with the help of princess Nigar who falls in love with Murad, they plan a coup and are successful in routing the Tsar and his men.

== Cast ==
- Kumar as General Murad
- Bibbo as Princess Nigar
- Sitara Devi as Gulnar
- Maya Banerjee
- Yakub Lala
- Kayam Ali as Jabir
- Sankatha Prasad
- H. Siddiqui as the Russian Tsar
- Pande
- Mirza
- Ramchandra
- Agashe

== Songs ==
#	Title	Singer
1	"Ham Dil Mein Soz-E-Ishq Ko Pinha Kiye Hue"	Sitara Devi
2	"Kyon Ham Ne Diya Dil"	Sitara Devi
3	"Jahan Tu Hai Wahin Mera Watan Hai"	Maya Banerjee
4	"Kis Liye Duniya Se Nafrat Ho Gayi"	Bibbo
5	"Main Taaron Ki Shahzadi Hun"	Maya Banerjee
6	"Phool Rahe Baki Na Chaman Mein"	
7	"Pyar Karne De Zara Aaj To Ji Bhar Ke Mujhe"	
8	"Ragge Jaan Se Khoon Uchhal Pade"	Bibbo, Anil Biswas
9	"Sab Jaaye Ko Saar Par Barsi"	Bibbo
10	"Saqiya, Saqiya Rang-e-Mehfil Kya Hua"	
