= Lagan (1941 film) =

- Directed by: Nitin Bose
- Written by: Binoy Chatterjee
- Produced by: New Theatres Ltd. Calcutta
- Starring: K. L. Saigal; Kanan Devi; Nawab
- Cinematography: Nitin Bose
- Edited by: Subodh Mitra
- Music by: R. C. Boral
- Release date: 1941
- Country: India
- Language: Hindi

Lagan is a 1941 Indian Hindi language film. It was the fifth highest grossing Indian film of 1941. The film was directed by Nitin Bose for New Theatres Ltd. Calcutta. The film was a bilingual with K. L. Saigal and Kanan Devi acting as the lead in its Bengali language version, Porichoy. The music for both versions was by R. C. Boral. This was the last film Saigal did for New Theatres, Calcutta, before his move to Bombay to make films for different studios there.

The film was a romantic triangle involving a poet, his beloved, and her wealthy husband. A theme, which was later followed by Guru Dutt, for his film, Pyaasa (1956).

== Plot ==
At the annual college event the main singer goes missing. To help matters, Kusum Kumari (Kanan Devi) plays a record. The lyrics of the song are by a young poet (K. L. Saigal) living in a village. The Principal of the college, impressed by the poet's work brings him to the city. The poet takes to training Kusum to sing for the next event and falls in love with her. One of the patrons (Nawab) is a wealthy businessman. He is enthralled by Kusum and after negotiations with her father, marries her in spite of the poet trying to intercede. The poet disappears, but after some time, the husband listens to Kusum and helps in furthering the poet's career. The gesture is misunderstood by the poet who thinks that the help was given to him because of Kusum's love for him. Finally Kusum has to let him know that for her the poet was a Guru she respected.

== Cast ==
- K. L. Saigal as Harish the Poet
- Kanan Devi as Kusum Kumari
- Nawab as Deendayal
- Nemo as Madholal
- Rehmat Khatoon as Poet's aunt
- Jagdish Sethi
- G. Vaid

== Reception ==
The film was a big hit at the box office. Kanan Devi won the Best Actress award from the Bengal Film Journalists Association's in 1942 for the Bengali version Parichaya.

== Music ==
The music director was R. C. Boral, with lyrics Arzu Lucknavi and Pandit Madhur. Boral made use of western influences in the music for this film like the use of a piano in "Kaaheko Raad Machayi". The major reason for the success of the film is cited as that the songs were sung by Kanan Devi (5) and Saigal (6).

=== Song list ===
#	Title	Singer
1	"Kaaheko Raad Machayi"	K. L. Saigal
2	"Hat Gayi Lo Kari Ghata"	K. L. Saigal
2	"Koi Manushya Kitna Hi Bura Ho"	K. L. Saigal
3	"Ye Kaisa Anyay Data"	K. L. Saigal
4	"Main Sote Bhag Jaga Dunga"	K. L. Saigal
5	"Kaise Kate Ratiyan Balam"	K. L. Saigal
6	"Hamari Laaz Nibhao Swami"	Kanan Devi
7	"Koi Samjhaye Ye Geet Sakhi Kya Hai"	Kanan Devi
8	"Tum Bin Kal Na Aave Mohe"	Kanan Devi
9	"Taakat Tu Haari"	Kanan Devi
10	"Madbhari Madbhari Matwari"	Kanan Devi
