= Karwan-E-Hayat =

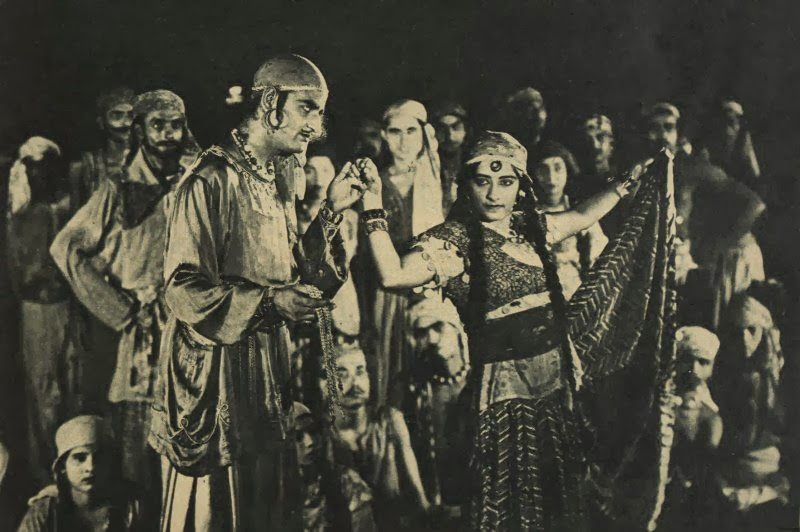
- Directed by: Premankur Atorthy; Hem Chandra Chunder
- Screenplay by: Hakim A. Shuja
- Produced by: New Theatres
- Starring: K. L. Saigal; Rattan Bai
- Cinematography: Krishna Gopal
- Edited by: Subodh Mitter
- Music by: Mihir Bhattacherji
- Production company: New Theatres Ltd
- Release date: 1935
- Running time: 122 min
- Country: India
- Language: Hindi

Karwan-E-Hayat is a 1935 Urdu/Hindi costume action-adventure film. The film is directed by Premankur Atorthy, with assistance by Hemchandra, for New Theatres Ltd. Calcutta; and it was produced by Lahore branch of New Theatres. The cast included K. L. Saigal, Rattan Bai, Pahari Sanyal, Rajkumari, Shyama Zutshi, Gul Hamid, Rajkumari, Molina, Shyama Zutshi, Siddiqi, Kapoor and Rana. The cinematographer was Krishna Gopal, with music composed by Mihir Kiran Bhattacharya and his brother Timir Baran Bhattacharya, with lyrics by Hakim Ahmad Shuja Pasha. The film, a costume drama, involved the Prince Pervez on the run from an arranged marriage to a princess, only to fall in love with her when they meet in unusual circumstances.

== Plot ==
Pervez, heir to the throne of Kascand flees from his kingdom when he finds that his mother along with the Wazir, has arranged his marriage with the princess of Bijapore. The villain Tikkim, wants to marry the princess and he has her kidnapped by the gypsies. Pervez during his escape meets some gypsies who have the kidnapped princess with them. He joins the gypsies and travels with them as a commoner. Zarina (Rattan Bai), one of the gypsy girls, falls in love with Pervez. Pervez and the princess find out the truth about each other and fall in love. Together, they defeat Tikkim.

== Cast ==
Cast according to the opening credits of the film

- Saigal as Parvez
- T. R. Rajakumari as Princess of Bijapore
- Nawab as Emir of Tikkim
- Hamid as Prime Minister
- Shyama Zutshi as Queen Mother
- Pahari Sanyal as Rahat
- Siddiqui as Ajaib
- Kapoor as Suhail
- Nemo as Gypsy Witch
- Ratan Bai as Zarina
- Malina as Sonia

== Music ==
The music of Karwan-E-Hayat has been credited to two music directors, Mihir Kiran Bhattacharya and Timir Baran Bhattacharya, with lyrics by Hakim Ahmad Shuja Pasha, the famous Urdu poet and writer from Lahore. Some sources credit R. C. Boral for the music as well, but there is no documentary basis for it. Three of the songs in the film were released on 78 rpm records, and all of them are credited to Timir Baran as a composer. The film's booklet mentions only the name of Mihir Kiran Bhattacharya as the composer, but no single song has been specifically attributed to him as such. The definitive information is available from a: Hindi Film Geet Kosh, compiled by Har Mandir Singh 'Hamraaz', b: photos of some labels of the film's 78 rpm records are available at www.kundanlalsaigal.com, c: a book on Saigal named JAB DIL HI TOOT GAYAA.

=== Songs ===
#	Title	Singer	Min
1	"Dil Se Teri Nigah"	K. L. Saigal	3.24
2	"Hairat -E- Nazar Aakhir"	K. L. Saigal	3.15
3	"Koi Preet Ki Reet Bata De"	K. L. Saigal, Pahari Sanyal	3.06
4	"Ye Kooch Ke Waqt Kaisii Awaaz"	Pahari Sanyal	3.21
5	"Shehron Mein Wo Baat Kahaan"	K. L. Saigal	
6	"Ab Kaise Chhupaaoon Main Dil Ki Baat"		
7	"Chal Ae Ri Sakhi Ab Aise Nagar"		
8	"Oye Hoye Ri Nindiya Mori"		
9	"Ishq Bina Kya Jeevan Hai"		
