= Mani Bardhan =

Indian-Bengali musician (1905–1976)

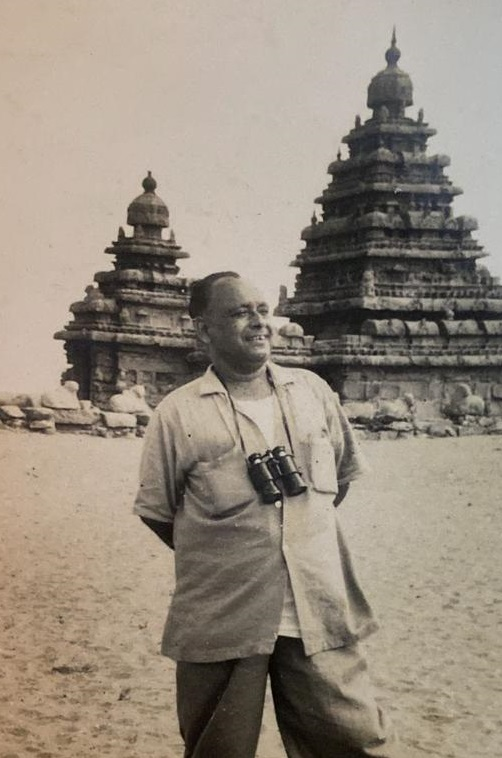
Mani Bardhan in South India, c. 1967

Mani Bardhan (Bengali: মণি বর্ধন) (13 December 1905 – 28 December 1976) was an Indian Bengali musician, dancer and choreographer specializing in Indian classical dance styles like Bharatnatyam, Kathakali, Odissi and Kathak.

== Early life and career ==
Mani was born in the village of Brahmanbaria in the erstwhile Colonial India, modern-day Bangladesh. He graduated from Victoria College, Comilla. A flautist in college, he formed a musical group with S. D. Burman and Ajoy Bhattacharya.

While in South India recuperating from an illness, he became interested in classical dance and trained in the South Indian styles of Bharatnatyam and Kathakali. He formed a dance troupe upon his return; later in life he also learned Manipuri dance, Kathak and Odissi. He was also familiar with the folk dances of Bengal, Bali, Java, Japan, Nepal and Tibet.

Bardhan became popular in the 1930s. His most well-known roles were those of Brihannala, Somadeva and Shiva. He also served as dance director at New Theatres for three years. During World War II he gave up dancing and dedicated himself to social service, rejecting offers from the colonial government to entertain troops.

== Writing and theoretical work ==
Bardhan published an encyclopedia on Bengali folk dance and music under the patronage of the government of West Bengal in 1961, called Banglar Lokonrityo O Geetiboichitro (বাঙলার লোকনৃত্য ও গীতিবৈচিত্র). It contained detailed descriptions of Bengali performance arts, including Baul and Chhau. His magnum opus Nabanga, on the nine aspects of dance, remains unpublished. He also gave lectures and presentations on Indian dance.
