= Sathi (1938 film) =

1938 film by Phani Majumdar

- Directed by: Phani Majumdar
- Produced by: New Theatres
- Starring: K. L. Saigal; Kanan Devi; Boken Chatto; Shyam Laha
- Cinematography: Dilip Gupta; Sudish Ghatak
- Music by: R. C. Boral
- Production company: New Theatres
- Release date: 1938
- Running time: 137 minutes
- Country: India
- Language: Bengali

Saathi (English: The Companion) is a 1938 Indian Bengali film directed by Phani Majumdar and produced by New Theatres. It was the Bengali version of Street Singer and the film was the debut of Phani Majumdar as a director. The film's cast includes K. L. Saigal, Kanan Devi, Boken Chatto, Amar Mullick, Sailen Chowdhury, and Shyam Laha. The story involves two young street children growing up together, singing in the streets and hoping to make it big in the show world. The film was one of Saigal's "most famous films" and a "classic" as far the music and songs of the films were concerned. The music was composed by R. C. Boral with lyrics by Ajoy Bhattacharya.

== Cast ==
- K. L. Saigal
- Kanan Devi
- Shyam Laha
- Boken Chatto
- Rekha
- Amar Mullick
- Sailen Chowdhury
- Bhanu Bannerjee
- Ahi Sanyal
- Khagen Pathak
- Sukumar Pal
- Binoy Goswami

== Music ==
The music was composed by R. C. Boral with lyrics by Ajoy Bhattacharya.

#	Title	Singer
1	"Raakhal Raja Re"	Kanan Devi
2	"Jhumar Jhumar Nupur Baaje"	K. L. Saigal
3	"Shonaar harin aaye re aaye"	Kanan Devi
4	"Ae Gaan Tomaar Sheesh"	K. L. Saigal
5	"Prem Bhikhaari Premer Jogi"	Kanan Devi
6	"Paaye Cholaar Pother Kathaa Ki Jaane Re Jogi"	Kanan Devi
7	"Ghor Je Aamaay Daak Diyechhe"	Kanan Devi
8	"Tomare Bhulte Paarina"	Kanan Devi
