= Daku Mansoor =

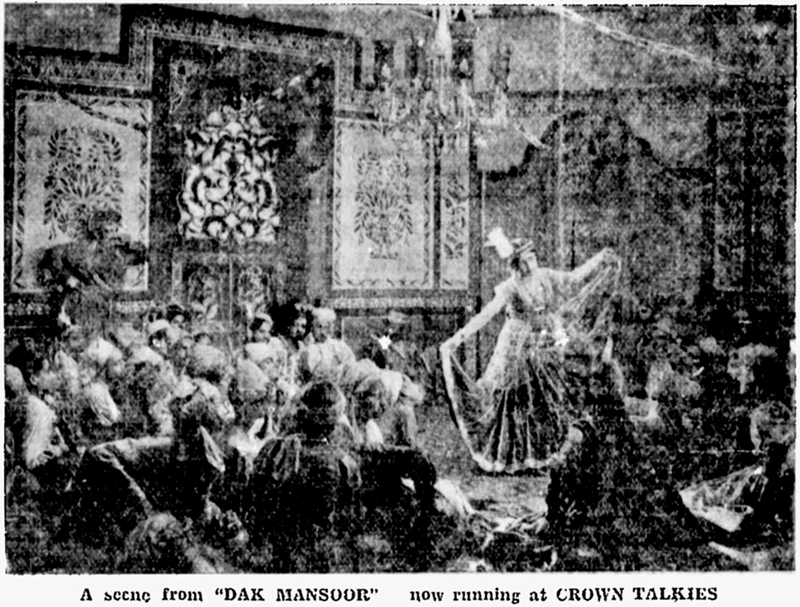
- Directed by: Nitin Bose
- Produced by: New Theatres
- Starring: K. L. Saigal; Uma Shashi; Prithviraj Kapoor; Pahari Sanyal
- Cinematography: Nitin Bose
- Music by: R. C. Boral
- Production company: New Theatres
- Release date: 1934
- Country: India
- Language: Hindi

Daku Mansoor (Mansoor the Dacoit) also called Karishma-E-Kudrat is a 1934 Hindi/Urdu costume action drama film directed by Nitin Bose. The film was produced by New Theatres Ltd. Calcutta and the music director was R. C. Boral. The cast included K. L. Saigal, Uma Shashi, Prithviraj Kapoor, Husn banu, Pahari Sanyal and Nemo. Daku Mansoor was the debut film of actress Husn Banu.

The film was based on a Bengali folktale and involves the dacoit Mansoor (K. L. Saigal) and his love first for Paribanu (Husn Banu), and then for Meher (Uma Sashi), and ultimately the rejection of his way of life.

== Plot ==
Mansoor (K. L. Saigal) is a dacoit who falls in love with Husn Pari (Husn Banu), the sister of the evil caliph. His escapades bring him notoriety and Mansoor moves to a new place where he stays as a guest at the merchant Ali's house. Ali and his family do not know Mansoor's past. Ali's daughter, Meher (Uma Sashi), starts loving Mansoor but he rebuffs her as he is still in love with Husn Pari. On learning that Husn Pari is to be married off by her brother, Mansoor becomes enraged. There follows a fight where Mansoor is badly beaten and in which Husn Pari gets stabbed by the dagger meant to kill Mansoor. Deeply affected, Mansoor gives up his dacoity and gets together with Meher.

== Cast ==
- K. L. Saigal
- Umasashi
- Prithviraj Kapoor
- Husn Bano
- Pahari Sanyal
- Nemo

== Review ==
T. M. Ramachandran called it "essentially a cameraman's (Nitin Bose) film" whose visuals evoked "more telling effects" than words could.

== Songs ==
Songlist:

| # | Title |
|---|---|
| 1 | "Aaya Ghir Ke Aaya Kaise Baadal Chhaya" |
| 2 | "Badhate Chalo Haan Jawani Manzil Hai Ab Thodi Door" |
| 3 | "Dhala Suraj Sham Hui" |
| 4 | "Gul Pe Nikhar Hai Taaja Khabar Bahar Hai" |
| 5 | "Ishrat Kya Hai Kuchh Bhi Nahin Sirf Ek Nazr Ka Dhokha Hai" |
| 6 | "Kaaya Ki Nahin Maya Bhed Kuchh Na Paya" |
| 7 | "Kaisi Sharm Hai Sar Kyun Jhukaya" |
| 8 | "Pa Gaye Tumhe Pa Gaye Hum Ab Usko Pa Gaye" |
| 9 | "Kaisi Aayi Jawani Duhai Hai" |
| 10 | "Woh Mujhse Dur Bhi Hai Laapata Bhi Hai" |
| 11 | "Shikwa Nahin Hai Mujhko Yaarab Na Kuchh Gila Hai" |
