= Mohabbat Ke Ansu =

1932 Indian film by Premankur Atorthy

- Directed by: Premankur Atorthy
- Produced by: New Theatres
- Starring: K. L. Saigal; Akhtari Muradabadi; Mahajabin
- Cinematography: Nitin Bose
- Music by: R. C. Boral
- Production company: New Theatres
- Release date: 1932
- Running time: 128 min
- Country: India
- Language: Hindi

Mohabbat Ke Ansu (transl. tears of love) is a 1932 Indian Urdu-language social romantic film. It was directed by Premankur Atorthy for New Theatres Ltd. Calcutta. The music for the film was directed by R. C. Boral. The film starred K. L. Saigal in his debut role with Akthari Muradabadi, Mahajabeen, Ansari, and Sadiq. According to reports the film was not successful however Nevile claims that the "debut was successful beyond expectations" as it led to Saigal acting in several New Theatres films.

== K. L. Saigal ==
K. L. Saigal had worked earlier as a railway timekeeper and typewriter salesman. He had done some amateur singing which was more in the form of Bhajans and ghazals which he had mastered on his own. On the basis of an impromptu amateur evening he was finally noticed by Pankaj Mullick and R. C. Boral who took the 26-year-old Saigal to New Theatres. He was introduced to B. N. Sircar who contracted him to star with Akhtari Muradabadi in New Theatres first Urdu talkie Mohabbat Ke Ansu. Saigal used the name Saigal Kashmiri for this and the subsequent two films Zinda Lash (1932) and Subah Ka Sitara (1932) as he didn't want his relatives to find out about his profession. Though the film did not do well he made an enormous impact with Chandidas (1934) and went on to become an idol and first superstar through his singing and acting.

== Music ==
- "Beqarar Itna To Kar De"
- "Ek Bimar Bhi Ghar Tujhse"
- "Buri Ghadi Thi"
- "Ham IzatrabeKalb Ka"
- "Koi Baanka Nukila Sajila Tumse Milega"
- "Nawaazish Chaahiye"
- "Piyarav Ko Seene Se Apne Lagao"
- "Sitam Ijaad Ho Koi"
- "Kya Aap Mere Marz Ko Achha Na Karenge"
