= Pujarin =

- Directed by: Prafulla Roy
- Produced by: International Film Craft
- Starring: K. L. Saigal; Chandrabati Debi; Pahari Sanyal; K. C. Dey
- Cinematography: Nitin Bose
- Music by: Timir Baran
- Production company: International Film Craft
- Release date: 1936
- Running time: 137 min
- Country: India
- Language: Hindi

Pujarin is a 1936 Hindi social film. It was directed by Prafulla Roy for International Film Craft. The film was based on a story by writer Sarat Chandra Chattopadhyay from his story "Dena Paona". The film was the remake of the Bengali film Dena Paona directed by Premankur Atorthy. The music direction was by Timir Baran with lyrics by Pandit Bhushan and Kidar Sharma.The film starred K. L. Saigal, Chandrabati Devi, K. C. Dey, Pahari Sanyal and Rajkumari. The story is about a reckless immoral youth who marries for money then deserts his wife due to circumstances, only to return as an aristocrat and reform through the love of his wife.

== Plot ==
Jibananda (K. L. Saigal) a selfish young criminally-minded man marries the rich Alaknanda (Chandra) for her money. With her help he changes and starts loving her. But his criminal activities catch up with him and he has to escape from the police leaving his wife behind. Several years pass and he returns as a rich aristocrat. The Pujarin (priestess) of the local temple, who unbeknownst to Jibananda, is his wife, gets into a conflict with him as she does not approve of his high-handed ways with the local people. He realises who the priestess is and reforms his ways, finally reuniting with his wife.

== Cast ==
- K. L. Saigal As Jibananda
- Chandrabti Devi As Alaka
- Pahari Sanyal
- K. C. Dey
- Shyam Laha
- Rajkumari As Hemavati
- Nawab
- Babulal
- Kailash
- Jagdish
- Kidar Sharma

== Soundtrack ==
The music direction was by Timir Baran and lyrics by Kidar Sharma. The popular K. L. song from this film Piye Ja Aur Piye Ja is said to have been recorded without any rehearsal. The composition for the music was a mix of Western orchestra with waltz and use of Raag Khamaj. The song seemed a foreshadowing of Saigal's life and "enchanted listeners".

=== Song list ===
#	Title	Singer
1	"Jo Beet Chuki So Beet Chuki"	K. L. Saigal
2	"Piye Ja Aur piye Ja Akbat Ki Baatein Jaane Koi Kya"	K. L. Saigal
3	"Kis Kaaran Bhar Aaye Aansoo"	Chandrabati Devi
4	"Phal Karmon Ka Ham Na Bhoge"	
5	"Jeevan Ke Aadhar Jagat Mein Tum Hi Ho"	
6	"Le Chal Le Chal Prem Ke Tat Par"	
7	"Manwa Re Preet Ki Reet Nibhana"	
8	"Moorakh Kaun Tujhe Samjhaye"	
9	"Nindariya Kahe Ko Jagai Sovat Rahi Such Chain"	
10	"Nirmohi Saiyan Jabse Gaye Pardes"	
11	"Sangh Na Sathi Bujhi Hai Baati"	
