= Kurukshetra (1945 film) =

1945 Indian Hindi-language film

- Theatrical poster
- Directed by: Rameshwar Sharma
- Produced by: Unity Pictures
- Starring: K. L. Saigal; Radharani; Nawab; Shanti; Ajit Khan
- Music by: Ganpat Rao
- Production company: Unity Pictures
- Release date: 1945
- Running time: 135 min
- Country: India
- Language: Hindi

Kurukshetra is a 1945 Indian Hindi-language film directed by Rameshwar Sharma. Produced Under the banner of Unity Pictures it starred K. L. Saigal as Karna, P. V. Narasimha Bharathi as Krishna, Radharani, Nawab, Shanti, Biman Bannerji and Shamli and had music composed by Ganpatrao. The film was cited as an offbeat film of K. L. Saigal, directed by a relatively unknown director; it's stated to be a "forerunner" to later Art Cinema. It was also the on-screen debut for actor Ajit Khan.

== Cast ==
- K. L. Saigal as Karna
- Nawab Kashmiri as Yudhisthira
- P. V. Narasimha Bharathi as Krishna
- D. Balasubramaniam as Duryodhanan
- Kashmiri as Draupadi
- Shamli as Padmavati
- Udwadia as Bhanumati
- Shanti as Kunti
- Radharani
- Ajit Khan

== Soundtrack ==
The lyrics were written by Jameel Mazhari while the singers were Saigal, Radharani, Satya Choudhary and Kalyani Das.

The music director was Pandit Ganpat Rao who was a classical musician and had trained under Abdul Karim Khan; the only other film he composed music for was Bebus (1950) where he was co-credited with S. K. Pal. The lyrics were written by Jameel Mazhari while the singers were Saigal, Radharani, Satya Choudhary and Kalyani Das.

=== Song list ===
#	Title	Singer(s)
1	"Aaj Kirnon Ka Karke Singaar Chali"	Chorus
2	"Aayi Hai Tu Toh, Kaise Dil Apna Dikhaoon Main"	K. L. Saigal
3	"Kidhar Hai Tu Ae Meri Tamanna"	K. L. Saigal
4	"Tu Aa Gayi Dil Ki Tamanna Jaag Uthi"	K. L. Saigal
5	"Mohabbat Ke Gul Hain"	K. L. Saigal
6	"Mere Sapno Ke Baasi"	Kalyani Das
7	"Ae Dukhi Mann"	Radharani
8	"Dil Bekaraar So Ja"	Radharani
9	"Kya Karna Hai Pooch Rahe"	Satya Choudhary
10	"Bin Kaaj Aaj Maharaj Laaj Gayi Mer"	Radharani
11	"Ae Baavle Man Kya Karoon"	
12	"Gaj Vadan Gun Sadan"	Chorus
