= K. L. Saigal =

Indian singer and actor (1904–1947)

K.L. Saigal
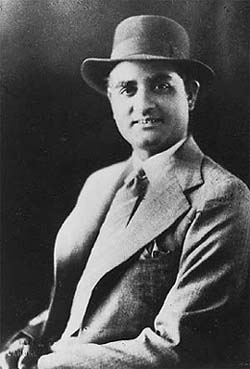
- Born: Kundanlal Saigal; 11 April 1904; Jammu, Jammu and Kashmir, British India (present-day Jammu and Kashmir, India)
- Died: 18 January 1947 (aged 42); Jalandhar, Punjab, British India (present-day Punjab, India)
- Occupations: Playback singer; actor
- Years active: 1932–1947

Kundan Lal Saigal, often abbreviated as K. L. Saigal (11 April 1904 – 18 January 1947), was an Indian singer and actor who worked in Hindi cinema, which was centred in Calcutta (Kolkata) during his time, but is currently based in Bombay (Mumbai). Saigal's unique voice, a blend of baritone and soft tenor, set the benchmark for many singers who followed him. Even today, it remains the gold standard, shining through despite the limitations of early and relatively primitive recording technology. Unlike other singers, he did not record songs for actors to lip-sync on screen. It was only in the final years of his career, from 1945 to 1947, that he recorded songs for studio release; these recordings were for his own performances as an on-screen actor. Thus, while most singers in Hindi cinema became playback singers, Saigal was not.

== Early life ==
Saigal was born on 11 April 1904 in Jammu to a Punjabi family. His father Amarchand Saigal was a tehsildar at the court of the Maharaja Pratap Singh of Jammu and Kashmir, while his mother, Kesarbai Saigal, was a deeply religious Hindu lady who was very fond of music. She used to take her young son to religious functions where bhajan, kirtan, and shabad were sung in traditional styles based on classical Indian music. Saigal was the fourth-born child of five, following two elder brothers and an elder sister, and preceding a younger brother. He was the first cousin of famous character actors Chaman Puri, Madan Puri, and Amrish Puri.

As a child, Saigal occasionally played the sitar in the Ramlila of Jammu. His formal schooling was brief and uneventful; he dropped out of school and started earning money by working as a railway timekeeper. Later, he worked as a typewriter salesman for the Remington Typewriter Company in Simla (now Shimla) which allowed him to tour several parts of India. His travels brought him to Lahore, where he became friends with Mehrchand Jain (who later went on to start the Assam Soap Factory in Shillong) at the Anarkali Bazaar. Mehrchand and Kundan remained friends when they both moved to Calcutta and had many a mehfil-e-mushaira. In those days Saigal was a budding singer and Mehrchand encouraged him to pursue his talent. Saigal often remarked that he was what he was because of Mehrchand's encouragement and early support. He also briefly worked as a hotel manager. Meanwhile, his passion for singing continued and became more intense with the passage of time.

== Career at New Theatres ==
Kundan Lal Saigal and Jamuna in Devdas, Barua's 1936 Hindi version.

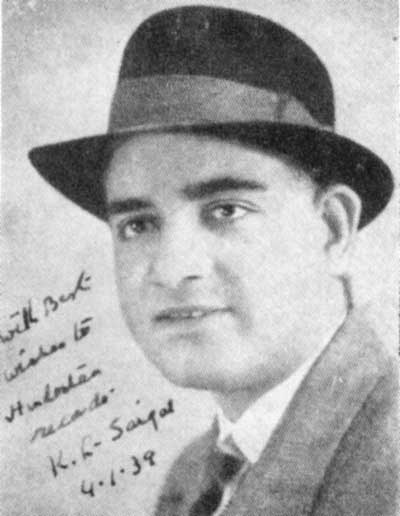
Publicity Photo of Kundan Lal Saigal

In the early 1930s, classical musician and music director Harishchandra Bali brought K.L. Saigal to Calcutta and introduced him to R. C. Boral. R.C. Boral took an instant liking to his talents. Saigal was hired by B. N. Sircar's Calcutta-based film studio New Theatres on a contract of Rs. 200 per month. There he came into contact with contemporaries like Pankaj Mullick, K. C. Dey and Pahari Sanyal.

Meanwhile, Indian Gramophone Company had released Saigal's record containing a couple of Punjabi songs, composed by Harishchandra Bali. In this way, Bali became Saigal's first music director. The first film in which Saigal had a role was the film Mohabbat Ke Ansu, followed by Subah Ka Sitara and Zinda Lash, all released in 1932. However, these films did not do very well. Saigal used the name Saigal Kashmiri for his first three films and used his own name Kundan Lal Saigal (K. L. Saigal) from Yahudi Ki Ladki (1933). In 1933, four bhajans sung by Saigal for the film Puran Bhagat created a sensation throughout India. Other films that followed were Yahudi Ki Ladki, Chandidas, Rooplekha and Karwan-E-Hayat. As a youngster, Lata Mangeshkar is alleged to have said that she wanted to marry K.L. Saigal after seeing his performance in Chandidas (1934). In 1935, Saigal played the role that would come to define his acting career: that of the drunken title character in Devdas, based on Sarat Chandra Chattopadhyay's novel of the same name and directed by P.C. Barua. His songs in the film Devdas (1935), "Balam Aaye Baso Moray Man Mein" and "Dukh Ke Ab Din Beetat Naahi", became popular throughout the country.

Saigal picked up Bengali very well and acted in seven Bengali films, produced by New Theatres. Rabindranath Tagore first heard Saigal before giving consent for the first time to a non-Bengali singing his songs. Saigal endeared himself to the whole of Bengal through his 30 Bengali songs.

Saigal's association with New Theatres continued to bear fruit in the successful films Didi (Bengali), President (Hindi) in 1937, Desher Mati (Bengali), Dharti Mata (Hindi) in 1938, Saathi (Bengali), Street Singer (Hindi) in 1938, Dushman (1939), Jiban Maran (1939) and Zindagi in 1940, with Saigal in the lead. There are a number of songs of this era which form the rich heritage of film music in India. Also, in Street Singer, Saigal rendered the song "Babul Mora Naihar Chhooto Jaye" live in front of the camera, even though playback was becoming the preferred method of singing songs in films.

== Move to Bombay and death ==
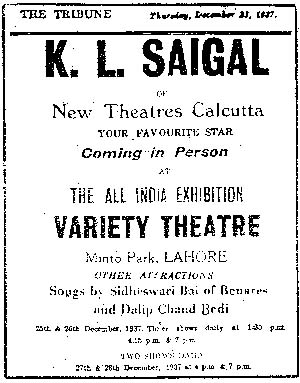
Advertisement for Saigal program published in The Tribune in 1937.

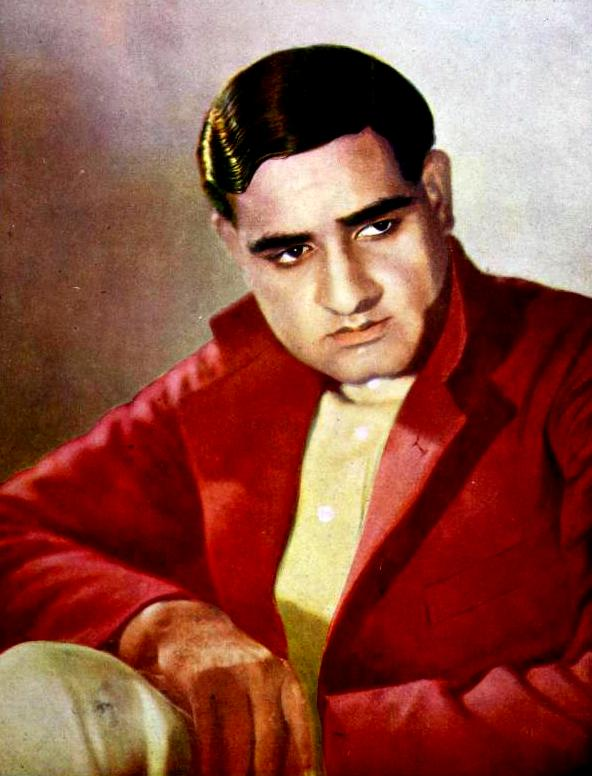
Portrait of Saigal in 1938

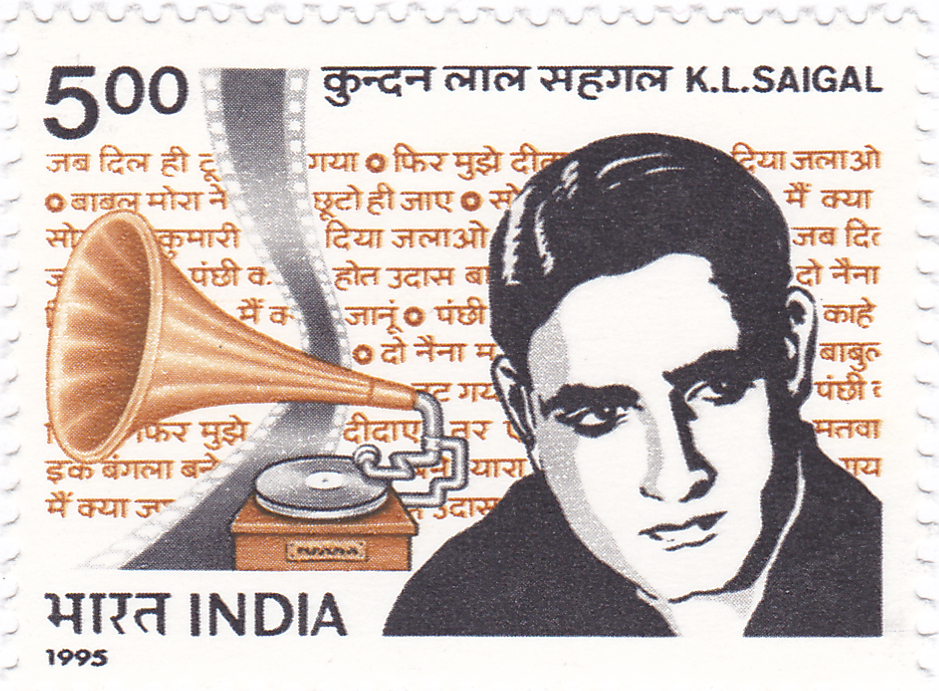
KL Saigal 1995 stamp of India

In December 1941, Saigal moved to Bombay to work with Ranjit Movietone. Here he acted and sang in a number of successful films. Bhakta Surdas (1942) and Tansen (1943) were hits during this period. The latter film is still remembered for Saigal's performance of the song "Diya Jalao" in Raga Deepak; in the same movie, he also sang "Sapta Suran," "Tin .. Gaa-o Saba Guni Jan" and "Room Jhoom Room Jhoom Chaal tihari". In 1944, he returned to New Theatres to complete My Sister. This film contained the songs "Do Naina Matware" and "Ae Katib-e-Taqdeer Mujhe Itna Bata De".

By this time, alcohol had become a predominant factor in Saigal's life. His dependence on alcohol had begun affecting his work and his health. It was said that he could only record a song after being fortified with liquor. He survived ten years of drinking; however, his alcoholism was too advanced for even a single attempt at abstinence, and Saigal died in his ancestral city of Jullundur (now Jalandhar) on 18 January 1947, at the age of 42. However, before his death, he was able to churn out three more hits under the baton of Naushad Ali for the film Shahjehan (1946). These are "Mere Sapnon Ki Rani", "Ae Dil-e-Beqaraar Jhoom" and "Jab Dil Hi Toot Gaya". Parwana (1947) was his last film, released after his death, in which he sang under the baton of Khawaja Khurshid Anwar. The four songs which Saigal sang in Parwana are: "Toot gaye sab sapne mere", "Mohabbat mein kabhi aisi bhi haalat", "Jeene ka dhang sikhaae ja", and "Kahin ulajh na jaana". Saigal was survived by his wife Asha Rani (whom he married in 1935); three children, a son and two daughters: Madan Mohan, Nina (born 1937) and Bina (born 1941); and an adopted child, his late elder brother's daughter, Durgesh Nandani, whom he adopted when he was still single.

In a career of fifteen years, Saigal acted in 36 feature films – 28 in Hindi, seven in Bengali, and one in Tamil. In addition, he acted in a short comedy Hindi film, Dulari Bibi (three reels), released in 1933. In 1955, B.N. Sircar released a documentary film based on the life of K.L. Saigal, Amar Saigal. In the film, G. Mungheri performed the title role of Saigal. The film contained 19 songs lifted from Saigal's films. In all, Saigal rendered 185 songs which includes 142 film songs and 43 non-film songs. Of the film songs, there are 110 in Hindi, 30 in Bengali and two in Tamil. There are 37 non-film songs in Hindi, and two each in Bengali, Pashto, Punjabi and Persian. His non-film songs comprise bhajans, ghazals and Lhori. He has rendered the creations of poets such as Ghalib, Zauq, and Seemab.

Saigal's distinctive singing was revered and idolised by the first generation of post-independence Hindi Film playback singers, including Kishore Kumar, Mohammad Rafi, Lata Mangeshkar and Mukesh have even gone on record in an interview that they consider Kundan Lal Saigal to be their musical Guru.

== Filmography ==
Year	Title	Role	Notes
1932	Mohabbat Ke Ansu		Debut film
1932	Zinda Lash		
1932	Subah Ka Sitara		
1933	Yahudi Ki Ladki	Prince Marcus	
1933	Rajrani Meera		
1933	Puran Bhagat a.k.a. The Devotee	Puran	
1933	Dulari Bibi		
1934	Daku Mansoor		
1934	Mohabbat Ki Kasauti	Arup	In Hindi version.
1934	Chandidas	Chandidas	
1935	Karwan-E-Hayat	Pervez	
1935	Devdas (Bengali)	Guest at Chandramukhi's House	Bengali
1935	Devdas (Hindi)	Devdas	
1936	Pujarin	Jibananda	
1936	Karodpati a.k.a. Millionaire		
1937	Didi (Bengali)	Prakash	as Kundan Lal Saigal, Bengali
1937	President a.k.a. Badi Bahen	Prakash	Hindi version of Didi
1938	Street Singer	Bhalwa	
1938	Sathi	Bhulwa	Bengali version of Street Singer
1938	Jiban Maran	Mohan	Bengali version of Dushman
1938	Dharti Mata	Ashok	
1938	Deshar Mati	Ashok	Bengali
1939	Dushman	Mohan	
1940	Zindagi	Ratan	
1941	Parichay	Composer	Bengali version of Lagan
1941	Lagan	Composer	
1942	Bhakta Surdas	as K.L.Saigal	Debut in Bombay
1943	Tansen	Tansen	as Saigal
1944	My Sister	Ramesh	
1944	Bhanwara		
1945	Tadbir	Kanhaiyalal	
1945	Kurukshetra		
1946	Shahjehan	Sohail	
1946	Omar Khaiyyam		
1947	Parwana	Inder	

== In popular culture ==
- The song "Saigal Blues" from the Bollywood film Delhi Belly (2011) pays tribute to him.
- On 11 April 2018, on the occasion of his 114th birthday, Google paid homage to Saigal with a doodle.

== See also ==
- Bollywood songs
