= Chandidas (film) =

- Chandidas
- Directed by: Nitin Bose
- Produced by: New Theatres
- Starring: K. L. Saigal; Umasashi; Pahari Sanyal; Nawab
- Cinematography: Nitin Bose
- Music by: R. C. Boral
- Production company: New Theatres
- Release date: 1934
- Running time: 128 min
- Country: India
- Language: Hindi

Chandidas is a 1934 Hindi social drama film directed by Nitin Bose. The film was produced by New Theatres, Calcutta, and became the studio's first major success. It was a remake of the 1932 Bengali film of the same name directed by Debaki Bose. This 1934 Hindi version starred K. L. Saigal, Uma Sashi, Pahari Sanyal, Nawab and H. Siddiqui. The music was composed by R. C. Boral, with the lyrics written by Agha Hashar Kashmiri. The film's credit roll states that the film is "Based on the life problems of the poet Chandidas –A problem India has not been able to solve", which involved the caste schism in India. The story revolves around the 15th-century poet-saint Chandidas, who stands up against the deep-rooted bigotry against caste, untouchability, and the hypocrisy of society, and a washerwoman with whom he falls in love.

== Plot ==
Chandidas (K. L. Saigal), a lover of truth and humanity is the disciple of Acharya (M. Ansari), a priest in the temple. Baiju (Pahari Sanyal), a washer-man lives with his wife and sister Rami (Uma Sashi) in the village where the Zamindar (landowner) Gopinath (Nawab) though outwardly religious and respecting the Brahmins is an evil man. Gopinath has a henchman Sarju (H. Siddiqui) who carries out his dirty work. Rami sweeps the compound of the temple where Chandidas sees her while he carries on his duties in the temple. They fall in love which causes resentment in Gopichand who has been eyeing Rami, but when she spurns his advances he has her kidnapped. His wife comes to the rescue of Rami and helps her escape. The Zamindar goons go after her and assault her. Gopichand convinces the priest that Chandidas should be punished and made to repent for associating with a lower caste woman. Chandidas agrees to this but then sees Rami’s injuries and realises the duplicity of the so-called pious men. He renounces his life in the village and leaves it accompanied by Baiju, his wife and Rami.

== Cast ==
- K.L. Saigal as Chandidas
- Umasashi as Rami
- Pahari Sanyal as Baiju
- Nawab as Gopinath
- M. Ansari as Acharya
- H. Siddiqi as Sarju
- Anwaribai
- Parvati as Kusum

== Music ==
The music was by R. C. Boral and lyrics by Agha Hashar Kahmiri with the songs sung by K. L. Saigal, Pahari Sanyal and Uma Shashi. The use of a "full-fledged orchestra" was attempted successfully for the first time for this film. The memorable song sung by K. L. Saigal and Uma Shashi, "Prem Nagar Mein Banaoongi Ghar Main" became extremely popular and "won K. L. Saigal nationwide fame".

=== Songs ===
#	Title	Singer	Min
1	"Tadpat Beete Din Rain"	K. L. Saigal	2.28
2	"Prem Nagar Mein Banaooingi Ghar Main"	Saigal, Uma Sashi	2.25
3	"Prem Ki Ho Jai Jai"	Saigal, Pahadi Sanyal, Uma Shashi	3.07
4	"Prem Ka Pujaari"	K. L. Saigal	2.39
5	"Basant Ritu Aayi Aali"	Uma Sashi	3.17
