= Zinda Lash =

- Directed by: Premankur Atorthy
- Produced by: New Theatres
- Starring: K. L. Saigal; Rattan Bai; Pahari Sanyal; Mahajabin
- Cinematography: Nitin Bose
- Music by: R. C. Boral
- Production company: New Theatres
- Release date: 1932
- Running time: 128 min
- Country: India
- Language: Hindi

Zinda Lash (The Living Corpse) is a 1932 Indian costume drama directed by Premankur Atorthy. The film was produced by New Theatres Ltd. Calcutta. The cast of the film included K. L. Saigal, Rattan Bai, Pahari Sanyal, Mahajabin, Nawab, Kumar and Radharani. The music direction was by R. C. Boral. B. N. Sircar started New Theatres Ltd. Calcutta in 1930 and produced his first film in Bengali, Dena Paona in 1931. In 1932 he produced films in Hindi where he introduced K. L. Saigal to Indian Cinema. The first was Mohabbat Ke Ansu and the second was Zinda Lash both directed by Premankur Atorthy. K. L. Saigal changed his name for his first three films and was billed as Saigal Kashmiri to prevent his family from finding out his profession. This film like his earlier Mohabbat Ke Ansu was not successful at the box office.

== Plot And Genre ==
According to Jess Nevins, the film Zinda Lash (Resolute Laash) set several centuries earlier, is about a prince who gets possessed by an evil spirit and sets out to terrify the people of his land. Laash, a warrior overcomes and finally kills him. In some books the film is cited as a comedy while others have labelled it under the costume or oriental genre.

== Cast ==
- K. L. Saigal
- Rattan Bai
- Pahari Sanyal
- Nawab,
- Kumar
- Mahajabin
- Radharani
- Ansari
- Hafisji
- Siddiqui

== Songs ==
The music was by R. C. Boral, and one of the popular songs from the film was "Laagi Karejwa Mein Chot", sung by K. L. Saigal.

=== Song list ===
- "Aankhon Mein Sar Rahta Hai Kyun"
- "Gujre Gujre Haan Yuhin Kate Din Rain"
- "Kaisi Duniya Hai Yeh"
- "Lagi Karejwa Mein Chot"
- "Saara Aalam Dhokha Hai"
- "Jaante Ho Tum Mohabbat Kis Kadar"
- "Kuchh Tum Hame Satao"
- "Pehle To Shauk Mein"
- "Sazaa Mili Hai Mujhe"
- "Tu Khaalik Hai Maalik Hai"
