= Debaki Bose =

Indian actor (1898–1971)

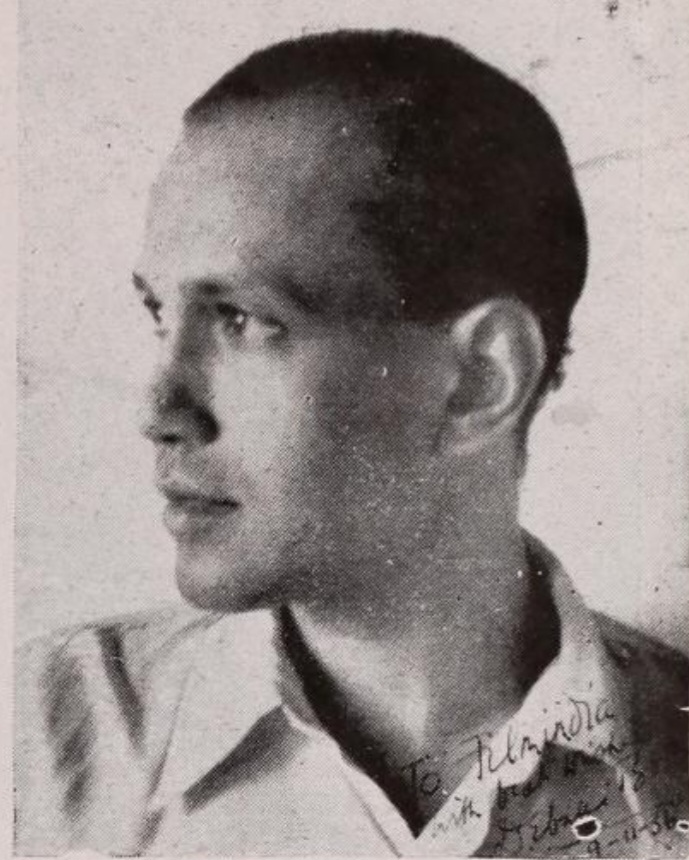
- Born: Debaki Kumar Bose; 1898; Burdwan
- Died: 1971 (aged 72–73); Calcutta
- Education: Vidyasagar College
- Awards: Padma Shri

Debaki Bose (1898–1971), also known as Debaki Kumar Bose, was an Indian director, writer, and actor who is recognized for his contribution to Hindi and Bengali cinema. He was born on 25 November 1898 in Akalposh, (now East Burdwan), Burdwan, Bengal Presidency, British India. He died on 17 November 1971 in Calcutta, West Bengal, India. He is known for his innovative use of sound and music in Indian Cinema. He worked first under the banner of British Dominion Films of Dhiren Ganguly and later with Pramathesh Barua's Barua Pictures and finally joined the New Theatres banner in 1932. He started his own production company, Debaki Productions, in 1945.

== Early life ==
Debaki Bose was the son of a successful advocate in Burdwan. He graduated from Vidyasagar College but left the university. Inspired by Mahatma Gandhi's call for non-co-operation movement, he walked out of an examination and started living on his own. He opened a shop in local market selling towels and was also the editor of a local weekly named Shakti. Dhiren Ganguly, better known as DG, an established film director from Calcutta, was visiting Burdwan at that time. DG met Debaki and as he came know about Debaki's writing skill, he invited Debaki to come to Calcutta and write film scripts for him. This culminated into the first film made by British Dominion Films named Kamonar Agun (lit. Flames of Flesh).

== Career highlights ==
- Debaki Bose was a top Indian film director in his time. During this period, many of the Bengali films made by him were also released in Hindi and even in Marathi and Tamil.
- Chandidas (1932), directed by him, contained background music for the first time in Indian Cinema. Raichand Boral, also known as R.C. Boral was the music director.
- Seeta (1934), made under the banner of East India Film Company, was the first Indian talkie shown in any international film festival. It was shown in Venice Film Festival, where it won an Honorary Diploma. He was the 1st Indian director to receive any international award.
- Sagar Sangamey (1959) was nominated for Golden Bear at the 9th Berlin International Film Festival (1959). This film got National Film Award for Best Feature Film at the 6th National Film Awards ceremony in 1959.
- Arghya (1961) was a very special documentary film, produced by the Government of West Bengal on the occasion of Rabindranath Tagore's birth centennial. It was based on four poems of Tagore: Pujarini, Puratan Bhritya, Abhisar and Dui Bigha Jami.
- He received Sangeet Natak Akademi Award for Film Direction in 1957.
- He received Padma Shri in Arts in 1958.

== Filmography ==
=== Director ===
- Panchasar (1930)
- Shadows of the Dead (1931)
- Aparadhi (1931) (Hindi Title: Aparadhi Abla, English Title: The Culprit)
- Nishir Dak (1932)
- Chandidas (1932)
- Puran Bhagat (1933) (English title: The Devoted)
- Meerabai (1933)
- Rajrani Meera (1933)
- Dulari Bibi (1933)
- Seeta (1934)
- Jeevan Natak (1935)
- Inquilab (1935)
- Sonar Sansar (1936) (Hindi Title: Sunhera Sansar)
- Bidyapati (1937) (Hindi Title: Vidyapati)
- Sapera (1939) (English Title: The Snake-Charmer, Bengali Title: Sapurey)
- Nartaki (1940) (Hindi Title: Nartaki)
- Abhinava (1940)
- Apna Ghar (1942) (Marathi Title: Apule Ghar)
- Shri Ramanuja (1943)
- Swarg Se Sundar Desh Hamara (1945)
- Meghdoot (1945)
- Krishna Leela (1946)
- Alakananda (1947)
- Chandrashekhar (1947)
- Sir Sankarnath (1948)
- Kavi (1949 film)
- Ratnadeep (1951) (Tamil title: Ratnadeepam)
- Pathik (1953)
- Bhagaban Shrikrishna Chaitanya (1953) (Hindi Title: Bhagaban Shrikrishna Chaitanya or Chaitanya Mahaprabhu)
- Kavi (1954)
- Bhalobasa (1955)
- Nabajanma (1956)
- Chirakumar Sabha (1956)
- Sonar Kathi (1958)
- Sagar Sangamey (1959) (English Title: Holy Island)
- Arghya (1961)

=== Writer ===
- Flames of Flesh (1930) (screenplay) (Bengali title: Kamonar Agun)
- Aparadhi/Aparadhi Abla/The Culprit (1931) (story)
- Chandidas (1932) (writer)
- Meerabai/Rajrani Meera (1933) (screenplay) (story)
- Jeevan Natak (1935) (screenplay) (story)
- Inquilab (1935) (screenplay) (story)
- Sonar Sansar /Sunehra Sansar (1936) (writer)
- Bidyapati (1937) (writer + screenplay)
- Sapurey/Sapera (1939) (writer)
- Nartaki (1940) (story + screenplay)
- Chandrashekhar (1947) (screenplay)
- Sagar Sangamey (1959) (English Title: Holy Island)

=== Actor ===
- Flames of Flesh (1930) (Bengali title: Kamonar Agun)
- Panchasar (1930)
- Charitraheen (1931)

== Awards ==
- 2nd Venice International Film Festival :

Won an honorary diploma for Bengali movie Seeta (1934 film)

- 9th Berlin International Film Festival(1959) :

Nominated at Golden Bear for Bangali movie Sagar Sangamey

National Film Awards

- 1953: All India Certificate of Merit for Best Feature Film – Bhagavan Sri Krishna Chaitanya
