= Raichand Boral =

Indian composer (1903–1981)

- রাইচাঁদ বড়াল
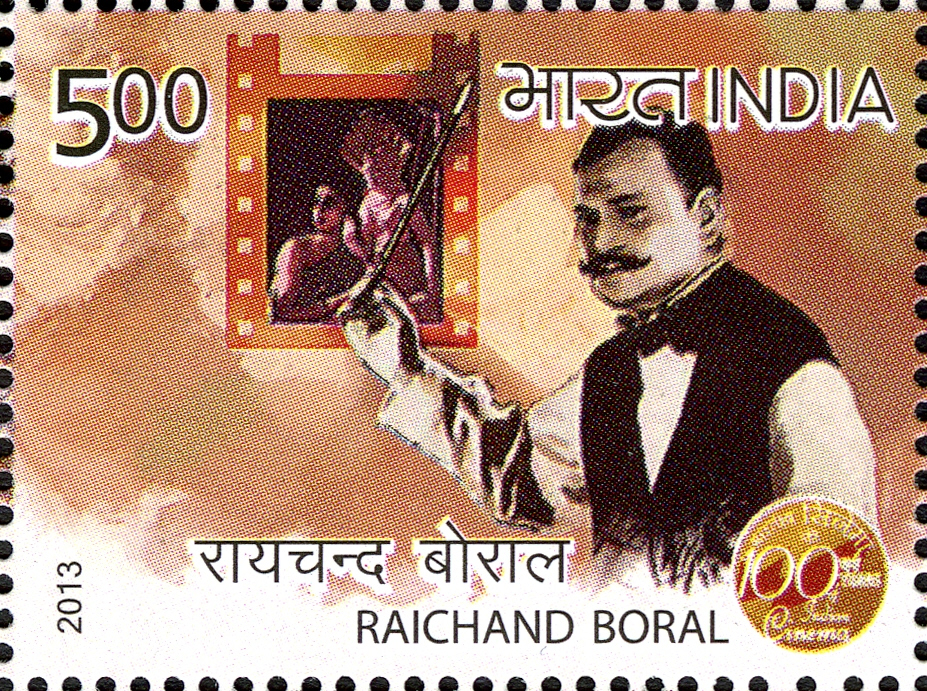
- Boral on a 2013 stamp of India
- Born: Rai Chand Boral; 19 October 1903; Calcutta, Bengal Presidency, British India (present-day West Bengal, India)
- Died: 25 November 1981 (aged 78); Kolkata, West Bengal, India
- Occupation: Music director

Rai Chand Boral (19 October 1903 – 25 November 1981) was an Indian composer, considered by music connoisseurs as the Bhishma Pitamah, the father of film music in India.

He was awarded the Dadasaheb Phalke Award, the highest award in Indian cinema, by Government of India, in 1978, and also in the same year, the Sangeet Natak Akademi award, by the Sangeet Natak Akademi, India's National Academy for Music, Dance and Drama.

== Early life and training ==
(Bengali: রায চন্দ্র বরাল) Boral was born in Calcutta. His father, Lal Chand Boral, was a classical musician (expert of Dhrupad). He was a grandson of Nobin Chand Boral, one of the early attorneys of the Calcutta High Court. Nobin Chand was married to the youngest daughter of millionaire and philanthropist of Hooghly-Calcutta, Sagarlal Dutta. Lal Chand had three sons, and Rai Chand was the youngest. Musicians from Rampur and Gwalior were invited for lessons. These include Ustad Mushtaq Hussain Khan of Rampur-Sahaswan gharana, Masit Khan (tabla player), and Ustad Hafiz Ali Khan (sarod player). Rai Chand learnt "Sath Sangat" on the tabla and attended music conferences in Lucknow, Allahabad, and Benares.

== Career ==
Raichand Boral is often credited to be the pioneer of Indian film music. Along with Pankaj Mullick, he was in charge of New Theatres' music department. New Theatres set standards in film music which have rarely been approached since. They also shaped film music in its early days and their format was followed for the most part for first 20–30 years in Hindi film music. He was also responsible for shaping Saigal's budding career. Anil Biswas called Boral 'Bhishma Pitamah of film music'.

Boral joined the Indian Broadcasting Company in the year of its inception, 1927. In 1931, he shifted to the New Theatres in the silent era for supporting the stage with live music. He dissolved the Ghazal style of singing from Northern India into the 19th Century Bengali tunes with string instrument medium. In 1935, he introduced playback singing for the first time in the Hindi feature film Dhoop Chhaon (1935). The song, "Main Khush Hona Chahun", had an all women chorus led by Parul Ghosh with Suprabha Sarkar and Harimati picturised in a dance sequence. After arriving in Bombay in 1953, Boral composed music for Dard-e-Dil (1953) with Lata's songs. Music for some basic records were composed by him. Anjangarh (1948) was his last famous film with New Theatres. He is correctly complimented by late Anil Biswas as the Father of Indian Cinema Music. He had directed the music of 70–75 (?) films (excluding live scores of silent movies) including Hindi and Bengali films.

He received the Dadasaheb Phalke Award the highest award in Indian cinema, given by Government of India, in 1978 at the age of 75. Also in the same year he received the Sangeet Natak Akademi award in the Creative and Experimental music category, the highest award for a performing artist, conferred by the Sangeet Natak Akademi, India's National Academy for Music, Dance and Drama.

He died in 1981 at the age of 78.

== Hindi filmography ==
- Mohabbat Ke Ansu (1932)
- Zinda Lash (1932)
- Subah Ka Sitara (1932)
- Puran Bhagat
- Rajrani Meera (1933) (Hindi)
- Meerabai (1933) (Bengali)
- Dulari Bibi (1933)
- Chandidas (1934)
- Daku Mansoor (1934)
- Mohabbat Ki Kasauti (1934)
- After the Earthquake (1935)?
- Karwan-E-Hayat (1935) (with Mihirkiron Bhattacharya)
- Dhoop Chhaon (1935) (with Pankaj Mullick)
- Inquilab (1935)
- Manzil (1936) (with Pankaj Mullick)
- Karodpati a.k.a. Millionaire (1936) (with Pankaj Mullick)
- Anath Aashram 1937
- Vidyapati 1937
- President 1937 (with Pankaj Mullick)
- Abhagin 1938
- Street Singer 1938
- Sathi 1938 Bengali version of Street Singer
- Jawani Ki Reet 1939
- Sapera 1939
- Haar Jeet 1940
- Lagan 1941
- Nari 1942 (not sure Bengali or Hindi)
- Saugand 1942
- Waapas 1943
- Hamrahi (1945)
- Wasiatnaama 1945
- Anjangarh 1948
- Pahela Admi 1950
- Swami Vivekanand 1950 (1955?)
- Dard-e-Dil 1953
- Shri Chaitanya Mahaprabhu 1953
- Amar Saigal 1955 (with Pankaj Mullick and Timir Baran)
- Nilachale Mahaprabhu (1957)

== Bengali filmography ==
- Dena Paona (1931)
- Punarjanma 1932
- Chirakumar Sabha 1932
- Palli Samaj 1932
- Chandidas 1932
- Rajrani Meera 1932
- Mastuto Bhai 1933
- Kapalkundala 1933
- Meerabai 1933
- Ruplekha 1934
- Excuse Me Sir 1934
- Debdas 1935 (with Pankaj Mullick)
- Bhagyachakra 1935
- Grihadaha 1936 (with Pankaj Mullick)
- Maya 1936 (with Pankaj Mullick)
- Barababu 1937
- Didi 1937 (with Pankaj Mullick)
- Bidypati 1937
- Abhigyan 1938
- Sathi 1938
- Sapudey 1939
- Rajat Jayani 1939
- Parajay 1939
- Abhinetri 1940
- Parichay 1941
- Prastisruti 1941
- Udayer Pathey 1944
- Biraj Bou 1946
- Anjangarh 1948
- Mantramugda 1949
- Bishnupriya 1949
- Mantramugdha 1949
- Bara Bou 1950
- Sparshamani 1951
- Paritran 1952
- Maa 1952
- Neelachaley Mohaprabhu 1957
- Sagar Sangame 1959
- Natun Fasal 1960
