= Pahari Sanyal =

Indian actor

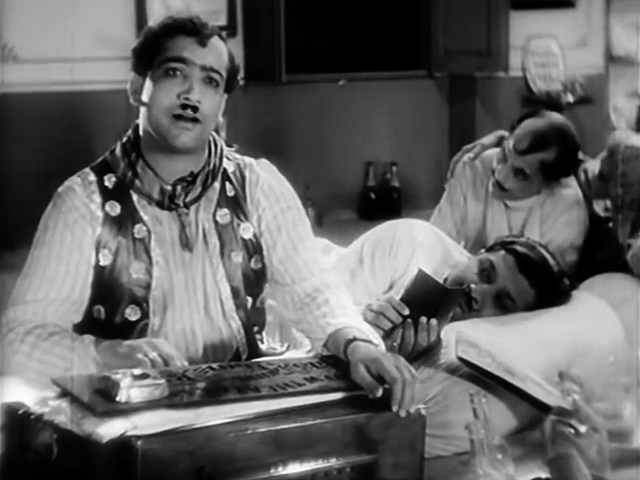
- Sanyal (extreme left), in Devdas, c. 1936
- Born: Nagendranath Sanyal; 22 February 1906; Darjeeling, Bengal Presidency, British India
- Died: 10 February 1974 (aged 67); Calcutta, West Bengal, India
- Education: Bhatkhande Music Institute
- Occupation: Actor
- Years active: 1933–1974 (till death)
- Spouse: Meera Devi

Signature
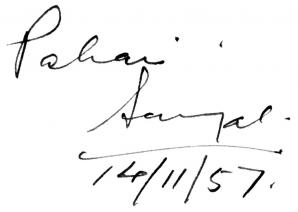

Pahari Sanyal (22 February 1906 – 10 February 1974) was an Indian actor and singer who is known for his work in Bengali cinema and Hindi cinema. He belonged to Lucknow and was one of the greatest Bengali actors from Uttar Pradesh.

== Early life and education ==
Born in Darjeeling as Nagendranath, but the nickname Pahari, one from hills stuck to him, throughout his career. After completing his schooling in Lucknow, he joined Banaras Hindu University to pursue engineering degree, however left it to study Hindustani classical music at Marris College of Music, Lucknow (later known as Bhatkhande Music Institute). Here he trained under Ustad Md. Hussain, Chote Munna Khan, Nasir Khan and Ahmed Khan and learn tabla from Rashbehari Sil and Abid Khan.

== Career ==
After serving as private secretary to Maharaja of Dewar for one year, he shifted to Kolkata in 1932, where he was PC Barua, and Debaki Bose. This led to him joining New Theatres as an singer-actor at a monthly salary of Rs 150 and debuting with Meerabai (1933) as Chand Bhatta, a role he reprised in the Hindi version, Rajrani Meera (1933), a biographical film on mystic Meerabai. By late 1930s, playback singing to getting established so he started focussing solely in acting. He received the Best Actor Award at the Bengal Film Journalists' Association Awards (BFJA) for film Pratisruti (1941) directed by Hemchandra Chunder.

After a bried stint in Hindi cinema in 1940s, in films like Milan (1946) directed by Nitin Bose , Sanyal returned to Kolkata and acted in many Bengali films, such as Harano Sur, Bhanu Goenda Jahar Assistant, and Shilpi. Besides being a supporting character actor, Sanyal has also played lead roles in his portrayal of Bengali reformer Vidyasagar and the poet, playwright and actor Girishchandra Ghosh in "Mahakabi Girishchandra". He played the small role of an ornithologist in Satyajit Ray's Kanchenjungha and later a character role in Aranyer Din Ratri. He has also acted in some Hindi films like the Raj Kapoor vehicle Jagte Raho (1956), Suchitra Sen starrer Mamta (1966), the dual version of "Aradhana" (1969) directed by Shakti Samanta and English films such as the Merchant Ivory Productions venture The Householder (1963).

== Selected filmography ==
Year	Film	Role	Language
1933	Yahudi Ki Ladki		Hindi/Urdu
1933	Rajrani Meera		Hindi
1933	Meerabai		
1934	Chandidas	Baiju	Bengali
1934	Daku Mansoor		Hindi/Urdu
1934	Mohabbat Ki Kasauti		Hindi
1934	Rooplekha		Bengali
1935	Dhoop Chhaon	Dipak	Hindi
1936	Karodpati		Hindi
1936	Bijaya		Bengali
1936	Manzil	Mahim	Hindi
1936	Pujarin		Hindi
1937	Vidyapati	Vidyapati	Bengali
1938	Abhagin		
1939	Adhikar	Ratan	Hindi/Bengali
1939	Rajat Jayanti	Bishu	Bengali
1939	Bari Didi	Surendra	Hindi
1939	Bardidi	Suren	Bengali
1939	Sapurey	Hindi	
1939	Sapera		Bengali
1940	Har-Jeet		
1940	Abhinetri		Bengali
1940	Zindagi		Hindi
1941	Pratishruti	Kumar	Bengali
1942	Saugandh	Kumar	Hindi
1945	Ramayani		Hindi
1946	Milan	Akshay	Hindi
1947	Naukadubi		Bengali
1947	Shravan Kumar	Shravan	
1948	Priyatama		Bengali
1949	Ultorath		Bengali
1950	Maryada		Bengali
1950	Panchayet		
1950	Vidyasagar	Vidyasagar	Bengali
1951	Ratnadeep		Bengali
1952	Basu Paribaar	Father	Bengali
1952	Bindur Chheley		Bengali
1953	Ratna Deepam		Tamil
1953	Bou Thakuranir Haat		
1954	Griha Prabesh		
1954	Sadanander Mela	Dhakkhinaranjan Chowdhury	Bengali
1955	Sabar Upare	Rita's brother, a journalist	Bengali
1955	Shap Mochan		Bengali
1955	Paresh		Bengali
1955	Bir Hambir		Bengali
1956	Shilpi		Bengali
1956	Jagte Raho	Shashan, Meenu's husband	Hindi
1956	Ek Din Raatre		Bengali
1956	Ekti Raat	Digbijoy	Bengali
1956	Chalachal	Doctor	Bengali
1956	Mahakabi Girishchandra		Bengali
1957	Harano Sur	Roma's father	Bengali
1957	Jiban Trishna	Dr. Shamonto	Bengali
1957	Prithibi Amare Chaye	Bengali	
1957	Dakharkara		
1958	Jamalaye Jibanta Manush	Narod	Bengali
1959	Deep Jele Jai		Bengali
1959	Sasibabur Sansar		Bengali
1960	Haath Baraley Bandhu		Bengali
1961	Manik		Bengali
1962	Kanchenjungha	Jagadish	Bengali
1962	Agnishikha		Bengali
1962	Kancher Swargo		Bengali
1962	Bipasha		Bengali
1962	Jaya		Bengali
1963	Deya Neya	Sucharita's Uncle	Bengali
1963	Shesh Anka	Sir Haraprasad	Bengali
1963	Uttarayan	Mr. Sen, Arati's father	Bengali
1965	Tapasi		Bengali
1965	Alor Pipasa	Doctor	Bengali
1966	Notun Jiban	Aruna & Nirmal's Father	Bengali
1967	Nayika Sangbad	Lahiri da	Bengali
1967	Grihadaha		Bengali
1967	Nai Roshni	Judge Kailash Nath	Hindi
1968	Saathi	Kaku	Hindi
1969	Sabarmati	Mahadeb Shankar's uncle	
1969	Aradhana	Gopal Tripathi	Hindi
1970	Aranyer Din Ratri	Sadashiv Tripathi	Bengali
1970	Dharti (1970 film)	King of Vasantpur	Hindi
1970	Rajkumari	Manju's maternal uncle	Hindi
1971	Bhanu Goenda Jahar Assistant		Bengali
1971	Shesh Parba		Bengali
1974	Rodan Bhara Basanta		Bengali

== Awards ==
- 1941: Best Actor Award: Bengal Film Journalists' Association Awards: Pratisruti (1941)
- 1965: Best Supporting Actor Award: Bengal Film Journalists' Association Awards: Jaya (1965)
