= New Theatres =

Indian film studio

New Theatres Limited
- Company type: Private
- Founded: 10 February 1931; 95 years ago
- Headquarters: Calcutta, West Bengal, India
- Key people: Birendranath Sircar (Founder)
- Owner: Birendranath Sircar

New Theatres is an Indian film studio. It was formed in Calcutta by producer B. N. Sircar (Birendranath Sircar, the recipient of Dadasaheb Phalke Award of 1970 And Padma Bhushan in 1972). It was formed on February 10, 1931. The company motto was "Jivatang Jyotiretu Chhayam," meaning, "Light infusing shadows with life." Sircar preferred to function roughly analogous to an executive producer. He built a processing laboratory, and acquired staff. Once a film subject was selected and a team assembled to create the picture, Sicar ensured that adequate funds were provided, while refraining from interfering with its execution. He made New Theatres a symbol of Bengali cinema's artistic good taste and technical excellence.

== History ==
Dena Paona, a Bengali talkie, was produced by New Theatres and released in 1931. It was directed by Premankur Atarthi, with music composed by Raichand Boral.

According to Kironmoy Raha, "New Theatres made its reputation secure with Chandidas directed by Debaki Bose in 1932," after the studio produced five talkies.

In 1935, P.C. Barua directed and acted in Devdas, based on Saratchandra Chatterjee's novel Devdas, and this film became successful in the industry.

In 1935, playback singing was first used in India in the Bengali film Bhagya Chakra by Nitin Bose. The singers were K C Dey, Parul Ghosh and Suprabha Sarkar. Dhoop Chhaon, a Hindi remake of this film, was the first Hindi film to use playback singing.

Kanan Devi was the first popular actress, who appeared in many films produced by New Theatres. There was also a group of actors working with New Theatres like K.L. Saigal, K. C. Dey, Prithviraj Kapoor, Trilok Kapoor, Chhabi Biswas, Bikash Roy, Pahari Sanyal, Basanta Choudhury.

Directors like Premankur Atarthi, P.C. Barua, Debaki Bose, Phani Majumdar and Nitin Bose worked in New Theatres films. Musicians who worked there included R. C. Boral, Pankaj Mullick, Timir Baran and Mani Bardhan.

== Filmography ==
New Theatres produced films in its studios at Tollygunge in Kolkata, founded on February 10, 1931. From 1931 to 1955, 150 films were shot in these studios. New Theatres made a comeback with the 2011 film Aadur Prem. Films produced by New Theatres include:

- Dena Paona (Released 30 December 1931) - Directed by Premankur Atarthi
- Natir Puja (Released 22 March 1932)
- Punarjanma (Released 2 April 1932) - Directed by Premankur Atarthi
- Chirakumar Sabha (Released 28 May 1932) - Directed by Premankur Atarthi
- Pallisamaj (Released 1 July 1932) - Directed by Sisir Bhaduri
- Chandidas (Released 24 September 1932) - Directed by Debaki Bose
- Mohabbat Ke Ansu (Released 1932) - Directed by Premankur Atorthy
- Zinda Lash (Released 1932) - Directed by Premankur Atorthy
- Subah Ka Sitara (Released 1932) - Directed by Premankur Atorthy
- Kapalkundala (Released 20 May 1933) - Directed by Premankur Atarthi
- Mastuto Bhai (short) (Released 20 May 1933) - Directed by Dhirendranath Gangopadhyay
- Dulari Bibi (short comedy) (Released 1933) - Directed by Debaki Bose
- Puran Bhagat (Released 1933) - Directed by Debaki Bose
- Sita (Released 26 October 1933) - Directed by Sisir Bhaduri
- Rajrani Meera (Released 1933) - Directed by Debaki Bose
- Mirabai (Released 11 November 1933) - Directed by Debaki Bose
- Daku Mansoor (Released 1934) - Directed by Nitin Bose
- Excuse Me Sir (short) (Released 30 March 1934) - Directed by Dhirendranath Gangopadhyay
- Ruplekha (Released 14 April 1934) - Directed by P.C. Barua
- P.Brothers (Cartoon) (Released 23 June 1934) - Directed by Raichand Boral
- Mahua (Released 31 August 1934) - Directed by Hiren Bose
- Chandidas (Released 1934) - Directed by Nitin Bose
- Devdas (Released 30 March 1935) - Directed by P.C. Barua
- Abaseshe (short) (Released 24 August 1935) - Directed by Dineshranjan Das
- Bhagyachakra (Released 3 October 1935) - Directed by Nitin Bose
- Manzil (1936) - Directed by P.C. Barua
- Grihadaha (Released 10 October 1936) - Directed by P.C. Barua
- Karodpati a.k.a. Millionaire (Released 1936) - Directed by Hemchander Chunder
- Mando Ki (short) (Released 21 October 1936) - Directed by Tulsi Lahiri
- Maya (Released 23 December 1936) - Directed by P.C. Barua
- President (Released 1 Jan 1937) - Directed by Nitin Bose
- Didi (Released 3 April 1937) - Directed by Nitin Bose
- Mukti (Released 18 September 1937) - Directed by P.C. Barua
- Arghya (short) (Released 25 September 1937)
- Vidyapati (Hindi) (Released 1937) - Directed by Debaki Bose
- Abhagin (Released 11 June 1938) - Directed by Praflla Roy
- Bidyapati (Released 2 April 1938) - Directed by Debaki Bose
- Abhignan (Released 11 June 1938) - Directed by Prafulla Ray
- Desher mati (Released 17 August 1938) - Directed by Nitin Bose
- Achinpriya (Released 29 October 1938) - Directed by Dhirendranath Gangopadhyay
- Sathi (Released 3 December 1938) - Directed by Phani Majumdar
- Street Singer (Released 1938) -Directed by Phani Majumdar
- Adhikar (Released 12 January 1939) - Directed by P.C. Barua
- Dushman (Released 1 Jan 1939) - Directed by Nitin Bose
- Baradidi (Released 7 April 1939) - Directed by Amar Mullik
- Sapure (Released 27 May 1939) - Directed by Debaki Bose
- Rajat Jayanti (Released 12 August 1939) - Directed by P.C. Barua
- Jiban Maran (Released 14 October 1939) - Directed by Nitin Bose
- Parajoy (Released 22 March 1940) - Directed by Hemchandra Chandra
- Daktar (Released 31 August 1940) - Directed by Phani Majumdar
- Abhinetri (Released 30 November 1940) - Directed by Amar Mullik
- Nartaki (Hindi) (Released 24 December 1940) - Directed by Debaki Bose
- Nartaki (Bengali) (Released 18 January 1941) - Directed by Debaki Bose
- Parichoy (Released 25 April 1941) - Directed by Nitin Bose
- Pratishruti (Released 14 August 1941) - Directed by Hemchandra Chandra
- Shodhbodh (Released 28 March 1942) - Directed by Soumen Mukhopadhyay
- Minakshi (Released 12 June 1942) - Directed by Madhu Bose
- Priyo Bandhabi (Released 23 January 1943) - Directed by Soumen Mukhopadhyay
- Kashinath (Released 2 April 1943) - Directed by Nitin Bose
- Dikshul (Released 12 June 1943) - Directed by Premankur Atarthi
- Udayer Pathey (Released 1 September 1944) - Directed by Bimal Roy
- Hamrahi (1945) - Directed by Bimal Roy
- Dui Purush (Released 30 August 1945) - Directed by Subodh Mitra
- Biraj Bou (Released 5 July 1946) - Directed by Amar Mullik
- Nurse Sisi (Released 27 April 1947) - Directed by Subodh Mitra
- Ramer Sumati (Released 24 December 1947) - Directed by Kartik Chattopadhyay
- Pratibad (Released 19 June 1948) - Directed by Hemchandra Chandra
- Anjangarh (Released 24 September 1948) - Directed by Bimal Roy
- Mantramugdha (Released 14 January 1949) - Directed by Bimal Roy
- Bishnupriya (Released 7 October 1949) - Directed by Hemchandra Chandra
- Rupkatha (Released 13 October 1950) - Directed by Soren Sen
- Yatrik (Released 1952) - Directed by Kartick Chatterjee
- Bhagaban Shree Shree Ramkrishna (1955) - Directed by Prafulla Chakravarty
- Aadur Prem, 2011 - Directed by Somnath Gupta

== See more ==
- New Theatres films
