= Cinema of Bihar =

Filmmaking industry in Bihar

- The emblem of Bihar
- No. of screens: 269

Produced feature films (2019)
- Total: 150

The cinema of Bihar, a state in eastern India, primarily consists of films in the Bhojpuri language. Bihar also has smaller Maithili- and Magahi-language film industries. Cinema in the state began during the early 20th century.

== History ==
Bihar's film industry began during the early years of the 20th century, when Jamshedji Framji Madan acquired the Elphinstone Theatre Company of Bombay in 1902 and converted it into the Elphinstone Bioscope Company. The Elphinstone Theatre in Patna (Bihar's capital) became the Elphinstone Cinema, screening short silent films until the advent of sound. The cinema exists under different ownership after the Madan family's economic collapse during the 1930s. Another silent-film cinema in Patna closed in 1931, early in the sound era. The city's first sound theatre, in the southwestern Babu Bazar, opened with Veer Abhimanyu in 1933 or 1934. The theatre was destroyed by a fire caused by flammable nitrate film, and was never rebuilt.

The first Bihari film was the silent Punarjanma (Life Divine) with Arati Devi, A. K. Prosad, Pratima Devi, and N. G. Bhattacharya. It was produced by Raja Rana Jagarnnath Prasad Singh. Arati Devi, who was Jewish, was 19 years old when she made the film. Born Rachel Sofaer in Rangoon in 1912, she moved with her family to Calcutta c. 1923. Devi had made only one other film a year before (1930's A Man Condemned), and her career ended when she married Sassoon Jonah in 1933. She died in childbirth in April 1948.

Prakash Jha made his feature-film debut with 1984's Hip Hip Hurray, a Hindi film shot in Jharkhand (then part of Bihar) and produced in Bombay. Patang was directed by Goutam Ghose. By May 2012, more than 150 completed films were awaiting release.

Bhaiyaa, the first film of Bihar with sound was a Magahi-language film, was released in 1961 directed by Phani Majumdar. The first Bhojpuri-language film, Ganga Maiya Tohe Piyari Chhadhaibo, was made in 1962 and released the following year. Bhojpuri and Maghi were spoken in earlier films such as Gunga Jumna and Nadiya Ke Paar, however. Films such as Laagi Nahi Chhute Ram and Bideshiya were popular in Bhojpur district.

Bollywood's Nadiya Ke Paar is one of the best-known Bhojpuri-language films. The first Maithili-language film was 1965's Kanyadan, directed by Phani Majumdar. The film, about a man who decides to learn Maithili because it is his wife's only language, is based on Harimohan Jha's novel Kanyadaan. Bhauji Maay and Mamta Gaave Geet (directed by C. Parmanand) were also popular; the latter is noted for its music and plot. Sasta Jingi Mahag Senur (directed by Muarli Dhar and released in 1999) was a successful Maithili film, with songs by Md. Aziz, Sadhana Sargam, Udit Narayan and Deepa Narayan.

Another successful Maithili film, Kakhan Harab Dukh Mor, was based on the life of the Maithil poet Vidyapati. Phool Singh played the lead role, with music by Gyaneshwar Dubey. Other Maithili films include Senurak Laaj and Dularua Babu. Ashu-Priya Productions' unsuccessful Aau Piya Hamar Nagari was released in 2000. Murli Dhar directed 90 percent of the film, and Manikant Mishra completed it.

The Maithili film Sindurdan was released in November 2007, but was withdrawn from theatres due to sound problems. Senuriya, directed by B.D. Prasad Chaudhary with music by Gyaneshwar Dubey, is dubbed from Tamil into Maithili. Surya and Diva Shree starred, and Rami Reddy played the antagonist.

Banner Dev Kala Arts and A. Y. Movies' 2005 Garibak Beti, directed by Manoj Jha and produced by Ajay Yash, was a low-budget Maithili success; Jha's next film was 2010's Mayak Karz, for the same producers. Two successful Maithili films were released in 2011: Sajana Ke Anagana Me Solah Singaar (directed by Murli Dhar) and Mukhiya Jee (directed by Vikash Jha). Another successful Maithili film, An Ideal Lady - Ramaulwali (directed by Niraj Yadav and Randhir Singh), was released in November 2014.

The Maithili film Gamak Ghar premiered at the Jio MAMI Mumbai Film Festival in October 2019, the first Maithili film selected for the festival. Cited as the region's first art film from the region, it had a positive reception at the festival and on the streaming service Mubi.

== Film festivals ==
The Patna Film Festival is an international film festival with participants from Iran, Canada, China, Japan, Sweden, Germany, Russia, the U.S. and India. Since 2006, it has been organized by of Union Ministry of Information and Broadcasting, the National Film Development Corporation (NFDC), the National Film Archive of India, the Federation of Film Societies of India and the state government.

Mini-film festivals were organized by Patna's Cine-Society during the summer and winter from 1973 to 1989; the last festival featured Charlie Chaplin films to celebrate his centenary. Cine-Society aided the government of India and cultural organizations such as the Bihar Art Theater. Facing competition from video, broadcast and satellite television, the society screens about twelve feature and four documentary films from around the world each month, organizes film-appreciation workshops and discussions, publishes a monthly newsletter and continues assisting governmental and non-governmental groups in organizing one or two mini-film festivals annually.

== Film cities ==
Two film cities were proposed in 2014: Rajgir Film City and a second film city in Valmikinagar. In 2017, Rajgir project was still in development.

Hyder Kazmi Film City Jehanabad Bihar

== Languages ==
Languages
2021 Indian feature films certified by the Central Board of Film Certification; Note: The actual number of films produced may be less.
Language	No. of films
Bhojpuri	104
Maithili	2
Total	106

=== Bhojpuri ===
Bhojpuri language films, targeting residents of western Bihar and eastern Uttar Pradesh, also have a large audience in Delhi and Mumbai due to the migration of Bhojpuri speakers to these cities. In addition to India, markets for these films developed among the Bhojpuri-speaking populations of the West Indies, Oceania and South America.

Bhojpuri cinema began in 1962 with Ganga Maiyya Tohe Piyari Chadhaibo (Mother Ganges, I Will Offer You a Yellow Sari), directed by Kundan Kumar. Although few films were produced over the next two decades, Bidesiya (Foreigner, 1963, directed by S. N. Tripathi) and Ganga (Ganges, 1965, directed by Kumar) were successful.

The 2001 film Saiyyan Hamar (My Sweetheart, directed by Mohan Prasad), made Ravi Kissan a star. This was followed by several other successes, including 2005's Panditji Batai Na Biyah Kab Hoi (Priest, Tell Me When I Will Marry, directed by Prasad) and Sasura Bada Paisa Wala (My Father-in-Law, the Rich Guy). Both did better in Uttar Pradesh and Bihar than mainstream Bollywood hits, and earned more than ten times their production costs. Although smaller than other Indian film industries, the success of Bhojpuri cinema spawned an awards show and the trade magazine Bhojpuri City.

=== Maithili ===
Kanyadan released in 1965, was the first full-length Maithili-language film. A number of Maithili-language films have been made, and Mithila Makhaan received a Best Maithili Film award in the language section of the 2017 National Film Awards.

== Awards ==
Sabrang Film Awards is held annually recognising films made in Bhojpuri language.

== Notable Directors ==
- Prakash Jha
- Neeraj Pandey
- Kabeer Kaushik
- Naveen Bhardwaj
- Manoj K. Jha
- Ritesh S Kumar
- Achal Mishra

== See also ==
- List of Bhojpuri actors
- List of Bhojpuri actresses
- List of Bhojpuri singers
- List of Bhojpuri people
