= Griha Pravesh (1979 film) =

- Directed by: Basu Bhattacharya
- Starring: Sanjeev Kumar; Sharmila Tagore; Sarika
- Cinematography: Adeep Tandon
- Edited by: Om Prakash Makkar
- Music by: Kanu Roy
- Release date: 28 July 1979
- Country: India
- Language: Hindi

Griha Pravesh (transl. Home entry) is a 1979 Indian Hindi-language drama film directed by Basu Bhattacharya. The film stars Sanjeev Kumar, Sharmila Tagore and Sarika. The film, about adultery, was the last of Basu Battacharya's introspective trilogy on marital discord and decay in an urban setting, which included Anubhav (1971), Avishkaar (1973).

== Plot ==
On one fine morning, Amar tells his wife Mansi that at one point of their relationship, the love in their marriage will gradually wane and only "togetherness" will remain. Mansi then proposes to go together on honeymoon, but this proposal is rejected by Amar who asserts that it will merely be a waste of money, which they have been saving for a long time to build a nice abode to live together with their son Babla. They currently live in a shabby home and is very keen to saving money for their dream house.

In Amar's office, a new typist named Sapna is appointed. Every co-worker gazes at her with a lustful desire, which she ignores. Her presence makes her co-workers forgetful of their works, negatively affecting the performances of the employees. The head of the Office initially contemplates terminating Sapna, but then arranges for her to seat at Amar's Cabin. He asks Amar whether he has any problem in sharing his cabin with Sapna. Amar reluctantly agrees to this arrangement.

Sapna is generally accustomed to getting everyone's attention. But Amar ignores her. This ignorance gradually draws Sapna to Amar. She gradually seduces him. Amar initially resists Sapna's seduction, but gradually gives in and launches a courtship. Amar feels that his and Mansi's relation has lost the color of love and their marriage is nothing but social obligation. He feels stressed and bored in the marriage while Sapna's company gives him the feeling of love he yearns for. He becomes stressed and shows sign of unnatural behavior at home. Even the coffee-loving nature of Amar is gone, and Sapna's persuasions have made him take interest in taking tea. These behaviors arouse surprise in Mansi.

As their relation grows closer, Sapna puts pressure on Amar to inform Mansi of everything and divorce her. Amar then falls into a moral dilemma but eventually admits their courtship to Mansi. Mansi pledges to leave Amar but wants to invite Sapna to her house. She says that Sapna has seen the accountant avatar of Amar, but to truly know him as an individual, Sapna must see the family man side of him. She says that during her stay in the house, Sapna must not know of the admittance of Amar and her courtship to Mansi. Amar agrees to invite Sapna and Sapna accepts the invitation.

Meanwhile, Mansi gets the house painted. She goes to a beauty saloon and coming to home, dons a nice saree. She sends Babla to his friend Kedar's house. Amar comes to the house with Sapna and is surprised to see the transformation of Mansi and the house. Mansi behaves very gently with Sapna. When Sapna decides to leave, Mansi tells Amar to see her off. Amar accordingly leaves with Sapna while Mansi weeps.

Amar leaves Sapna halfway and bids her adieu. Sapna, understanding that Amar has refound the lost color in his life, gives a grin. Amar returns to home and have a cup of coffee with Mansi and Babla.

== Cast ==
- Sanjeev Kumar ... Amar
- Sharmila Tagore ... Mansi
- Sarika ... Sapna
- Master Bittoo ... Babla (child)
- Dinesh Thakur ... Shashi
- Priyadarshini ... Meena
- Sudha Chopra ... Quarrelsome Neighbor
- Kanu Roy
- Gulzar ... Guest Appearance in song
- Manik Dutt
- Vimal Joshi
- Raj Verma
- Nandlal Sharma
- R.S. Chopra
- Satya Banerjee
- Shashi Jain
- Tarun Mukherjee
- Nilesh
- Khokha Mukherji

== Soundtrack ==
The film features numerous songs, some of whom had been used in Bhattacharjee's old films. The songs used in the film are "Boliye Surili Boliyaan”, a duet by Bhupinder Singh and Sulakshana Pandit, Zindagi Phoolon Ki Nahi” by Bhupinder, Pehchaan To Thi Pehchana Nahi” by Chandrani Mukherjee, Logon Ke Ghar Mein Rehta Hai” and “Machal Ke Jab Bhi Aankhon Mein by Bhupender and "Aap Agar Aap Na Hote" by Sulakshana. The music was composed by Kanu Roy and lyrics were written by Gulzar.

The song "Boliye Surili Boliyaan" is set in raga Bihag.

== Reception ==
Sumit Mitra of India Today said, "Normally, for a good director, the story comes first and the style follows. The craft is determined by the characters and the attitudes inherent in the script. But it is the other way round with Basu".
