= Khamosh Nigahen =

Khamosh Nigahen (lit. 'Silent Eyes') may refer to:

- Khamosh Nigahen (1946 film), an Indian film by Moti B. Gidwani, starring Manorama, Zahoor Shah and Pran
- Khamosh Nigahen (1971 film), a Pakistani film
- Khamosh Nigahen (1986 film), an Indian film by Ajay Sharma, starring Iftekhar, Shashikala and Deepti Naval

== See also ==
- Khamoshi (disambiguation)
