= PIFF =

PIFF may refer to:

- Busan International Film Festival, previously Pusan International Film Festival, South Korea
- Pyongyang International Film Festival, North Korea
- Pearl International Film Festival, Kampala, Uganda
- Pondicherry International Film Festival, Union Territory of Puducherry, India
- Prague Independent Film Festival, Czech Republic
- Pride International Film Festival, Manila, Philippines
- Provincetown International Film Festival, Provincetown, Massachusetts
- Pune International Film Festival, Maharashtra, India
- Patna Film Festival, formerly Patna International Film Festival, Bihar, India
