= Babul (Hindi word) =

Babul (Hindi: बाबुल, Pronounced: bəˈbo͞ol) is an old Hindi term for father indicating a daughter's affection and used in Indian literature at the separations of fathers and daughters. The term is now mainly used in Bollywood songs in the context of a newly married daughter leaving her father's home.

In India, the conclusion of a daughter's marriage, marked by the bidaai (farewell) ceremony, is a profoundly sad occasion, because after this she leaves her father's house and permanently relocates to her husband's family. The moment thus marks the end of her past life and the beginning of a new one. The expression of this sentiment varies, but is usually in the formed of hushed sobs, while maintaining sober calmness and composure. This sentiment is often reflected in Bollywood and regional films.

== Famous examples ==
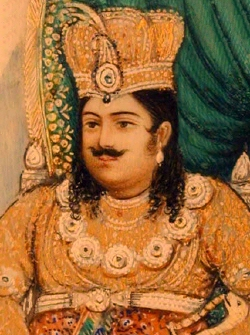
Wajid Ali Shah

Wajid Ali Shah (1822–1887), the last nawab of Awadh, wrote a popular bhairavi thumri "Babul Mora Naihar Chhooto Jaye", where he likens bidai to death, and his own banishment for his beloved Lucknow (video search for Saigal's 1938 rendition):

बाबुल मोरा, नैहर छूटो ही जाए
चार कहार मिल, मोरी डोलिया उठायें ...
मोरा अपना बेगाना छूटो जाए |...
आँगना तो पर्बत भयो और देहरी भयी बिदेश ...
जाए बाबुल घर आपनो मैं चली पीया के देश | बाबुल मोरा ...

Translation:

My father! I'm leaving home.
The four bearers lift my doli (palanquin) (here it can also mean the four coffin bearers). I'm leaving those who were my own.
Your courtyard is now like a mountain, and the threshold, a foreign country.
I leave your house, father, I am going to my beloved.

The expression is found in the Sanskrit texts also. In Abhijñānaśākuntalam the sage Kanva, who had adopted Shakuntala, mourns:

यास्यत्यद्य शकुन्तलेति हृदयं संस्पृष्टमुत्कण्ठया ..
ऐक्लव्यं मम तावदीदृशमिदं स्नेहादरण्यौकसः
पीड्यन्ते गृहिणः कथं नु तनयाविश्लेषदुःखैर्नवैः||६||

Shakuntala must go to-day, I miss her now at heart ..
What must a father feel, when come
The pangs of parting from his child at home?

== Gurbani ==
This word Babul has been used in Gurbani, the Sikh scripture few times. Babul means father. God has been referred to as Babul in Gurbani.

ਬਾਬੁਲੁ ਮੇਰਾ ਵਡ ਸਮਰਥਾ ਕਰਣ ਕਾਰਣ ਪ੍ਰਭੁ ਹਾਰਾ ॥

My father (Babul, God) is all powerful and capable. He is the doer and cause of everything.

== Farewell from father ==
Many Bollywood movies have songs on the babul theme. There have been several movies that use the term "babul" in the title: Babul (1950 film), Baabul (2006 film), Babul Ka Aangann Chootey Na (it is hard to leave father's courtyard) and Babul Ki Galiyaan (father's streets).

A song by punjabi singer Amrinder Gill from his album Judaa 2 is also titled Babul.

A song by Sahir Ludhiyanvi from 1968 film Neel Kamal is often played in Indian weddings is

"Baabul ki duaaen leti ja, ja tujh ko sukhi sansaar mile"

बाबुल की दुआएं लेती जा, जा तुझ को सुखी संसार मिले

नाज़ों से तुझे पाला मैनें, कलियों की तरह, फूलों की तरह
बचपन में झुलाया है तुझ को, बाँहों ने मेरी झूलों कि तरह
मेरे बाग़ की ऐ नाज़ुक डाली, तुझे हर पल नई बहार मिले |

Take your father's blessing! May you find a happy world.

I raised you tenderly with love, like a flower,
I used to swing you in my own arms like a swing.
O delicate branch of my garden, may you always find spring.

It is said that the singer Mohammad Rafi sang this song just before his own daughter's marriage.

Shakeel Badayuni wrote this song for the 1957 classic Mother India:

"Pee ke ghar aaj pyaari dulhaniya chali"

पी के घर आज प्यारी दुल्हनिया चली
रोएं माता पिता उनकी दुनिया चली

मेरी क़िस्मत में जाता था परदेस रे
छोड़ कर अपने बाबुल का आँगन चली

The bride leaves today for her beloved's house.
The father and mother cry, their world is going away.
It was my fate to go to a distant land,
I leave, leaving behind my father's courtyard.

== Returning to father's home in Savan ==
In the month of Savan (Shravana), the bride is supposed to return to her father home, now as an outsider. A song by Shailendra (movie Bandini) expresses this (video search):

अब के बरस भेज भैयाको बाबुल
सावन में लीजो बुलाय रे
लौटेंगी जब मेरे बचपन की सखियाँ
दीजो संदेशा भिजाय रे

This year, father, send my brother,
to come and get me during Savan,
when my childhood friends will also return,
do send a message asking me to come.

This song forms the title of a 2002 film Ab Ke Baras.

== See also ==
- Wajid Ali Shah
- Weddings in India
- Hindi film music
- Hindi wedding songs
- Hindi dance music
