= Street Singer (film) =

- Directed by: Phani Majumdar
- Produced by: New Theatres
- Starring: K. L. Saigal; Kanan Devi; Jagdish Sethi; Bikram Kapoor
- Cinematography: Dilip Gupta; Sudish Ghatak
- Music by: R. C. Boral
- Production company: New Theatres
- Release date: 24 November 1938
- Running time: 135 min
- Country: India
- Language: Hindi

Street Singer is a 1938 Indian film directed by Phani Majumdar. It was produced by New Theatres of Calcutta and was Phani Majumdar's first Hindi film as a director. The film was made in Bengali as Sathi in the same year. It stars K. L. Saigal, Kanan Devi, Jagdish Sethi and Bikram Kapoor. The music was composed by R. C. Boral with lyrics written by Arzu (Arzoo) Lucknavi. Two street urchins dream of singing and making it big in the glamorous world of theatre in Calcutta. They grow up with the girl being employed while the boy is not. The story follows them through first their enchantment and then the disillusionment with the theatre. Finally both choose to return to their roots in the village.

== Plot ==
Bhulwa helps Manju escape from a burning orphanage and from the care of the tyrannical manager of the orphanage. The two street urchins go from village to village, singing and making money. Bhulwa’s big dream is to someday sing in a theatre in Calcutta. Several years later both are singing on the streets in Calcutta and Manju is employed by a theatre to sing. Bhulwa encourages her through her nervousness and she becomes a popular singer. However her attitude towards servants and other people changes and Bhulwa is disappointed and tells her off. Bhulwa is still struggling but manages to get a chance to sing on the radio.

Manju learns of his singing assignment when she listens to him sing on the radio. Feeling slighted she decides to sing Bhulwa’s song in a new style, the way the actor-manager Kailash wants. She leaves a message with the servant asking him to send Bhulwa to the theatre. Bhulwa gets drenched in the rain and is feverish but he goes to listen to Manju. On hearing the new tune given to his favourite song he gets aggressive on the stage and then leaves from there. Manju by now is repentant and decides to search for him. She asks the manager-actor Kailash to drive her and searches the roads by which both had travelled to come to the city. She spies Bhulwa in a boat which is being tossed around due to the wind and storm. The boat crashes against the banks. Manju rushes to Bhulwa and cradles his head on her lap. Kailash leaves them, while both look towards the road leading to the village.

== Cast ==
- K. L. Saigal
- Kanan Devi
- Jagdish
- Chaman Puri as Munshi also writer in theatre
- Bikram Kapoor
- Shabir
- A. H. Shore
- Shyam Laha

== Production ==
Street Singer was Phani Majumdar's first and most famous Hindi film. Saigal and Kanan Devi were a sensation nationwide following this film. The film helped establish Kanan Devi’s popularity and her ‘melody queen’ status. It is also ranked as one of Saigal’s greatest hits, where his rendition of Wajid Ali Shah’s Bhairavi thumri "Babul Mora Naihar Chhooto Jaye" is considered a classic. Majumdar considered Saigal an exceptional artist. He felt he could pan the camera on his face irrespective of who was giving the dialogues. When Saigal sang "Babul Mora', he requested Majumdar not to use recording and playback (his own song) on him, but to let him sing live on the sets. He sang the song pacing the streets with the harmonium.

== Soundtrack ==
The songs became popular making K. L. Saigal and Kanan Devi a craze in India. Saigal's song "Babul Mora Naihar Chhooto Hi Jaaye" is associated with him as "an immortal singer". The music was by R. C. Boral and lyrics by Arzu Lucknavi. The bhairavi thumri "Babul Mora" is by Wajid Ali Shah.

=== Track listing ===
#	Title	Singer(s)	Raga
1	"Babul Mora Naihar Chhooto Hi Jaaye"	K. L. Saigal	Bhairavi
2	"Suqun Dil Ko Mayassar"	K. L. Saigal, Kanan Devi	
3	"Lachhami Murat Daras Dikhaaye "	K. L. Saigal, Kanan Devi	
4	"Jeevan Been Madhur Na Baaje"	K. L. Saigal	
5	"Sanwariya Prem Ki Bansi Suna "	K. L. Saigal, Kanan Devi	
6	"Khalo Madam Khana"	Khemchand Prakash	
