= Lalka Paag =

- Directed by: Prashant Nagendra
- Screenplay by: Prashant Nagendra
- Produced by: Ratnesh N Shah
- Starring: Sweta Verma, Meena Gautam
- Cinematography: Anirudha Singh
- Music by: Sitaram Singh
- Release date: 2015
- Country: India
- Language: Maithili

Lalka Paag is a 2015 Maithili-language film directed by Prashant Nagendra and produced by Ratesh N. Shah. It depicts the story of Tiru, a simple, chaste village girl, and Radhakant, a modern-day man with high educational qualification.

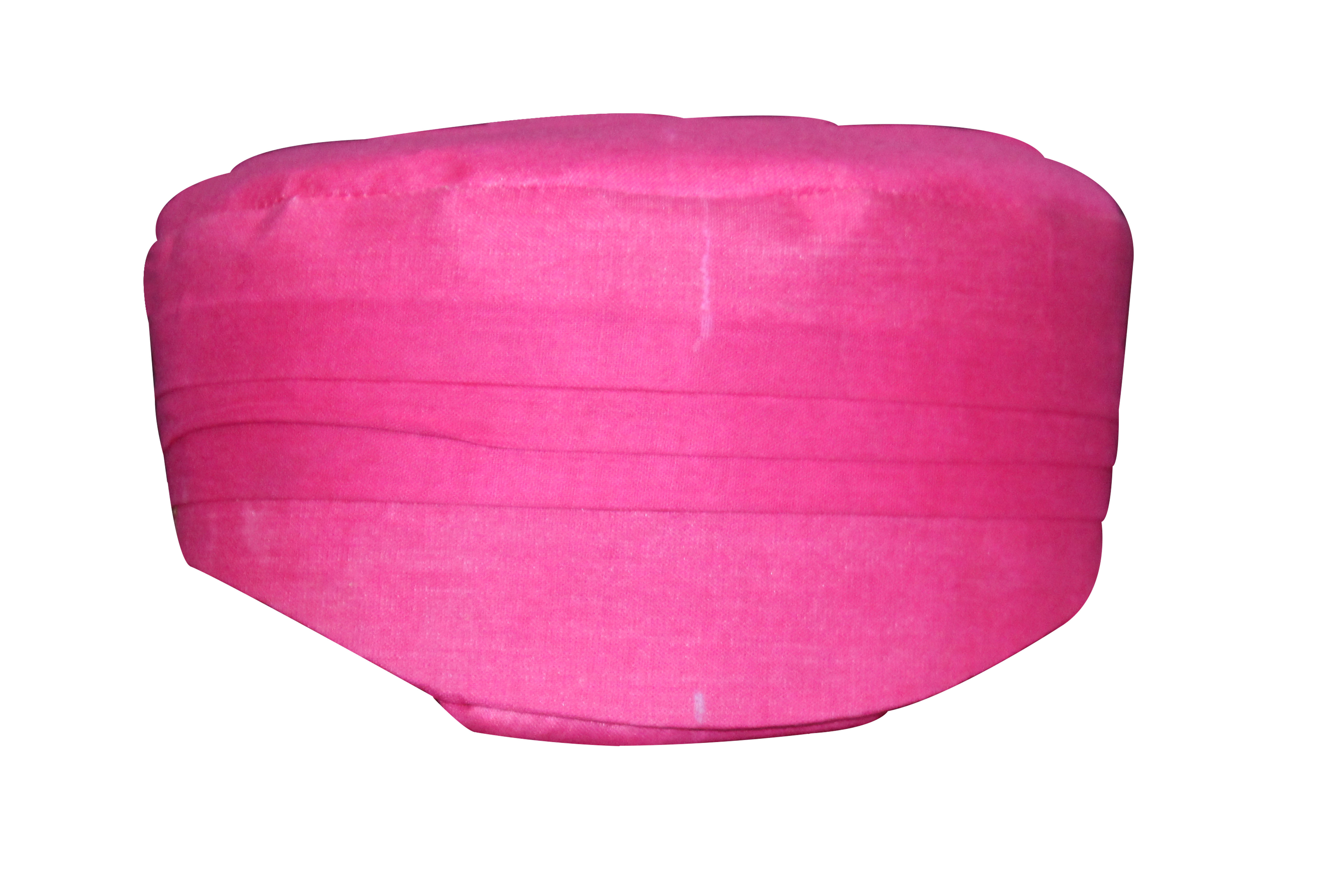
A traditional paag headwear from Mithila

== Synopsis ==
Radhakant gets forcefully married to Tiru instead of his college love-Kamakhya. Tiru is a reflection as well as a representation of the ideal Maithili women, an epitome of sacrifice. She is well-aware of all the rituals and societal prescribed duties of her life. Tiru was aware that Radha would never full-heartedly accept her as his wife. The suppressing silence of Tiru soon became her enemy. This perennial silence made her spouse and in-laws even stronger and negligent towards her emotions. So much that Radhakant started contemplating on getting married with Kamakhya. Radhakant confesses his intention to marry Kamakhya in front of Tiru. She declares she has no objection. Now, Tiru becomes like puzzle to Radhakant, an unsolved and inviting puzzle. During marriage ceremony, the priest requests Radha to put up red turban on his head, as this has been the costume of Maithili marriage for centuries. Tiru gives him Lalka Paag, the same which was used in her marriage with Radha. Beholding this sacrifice of Tiru, Radha bursts into tears. Radha is mesmerized by the beauty of Tiru, pure and untouched by modernization. Radha now is in a dilemma, one side there is Tiru in all her innocence and purity and on the other is Kamakhya, the love of his life.
