= Maithili cinema =

Maithili film industry

Maithili cinema is the film industry of the Maithili language mainly active in the Mithila region of Bihar and Nepal. It is a small scale film industry based in the Mithila region. In recent years the Maithili film industry is gradually increasing its horizon. Apart from the native land, Maithili movies are being shot in countries like USA and Canada. The industry has also received recognition at the National Film Awards. As of 2026, four Maithili language films have won National Film Awards across the feature and non-feature film categories, reflecting the growing critical acclaim of Maithili-language cinema. In 2016, the Maithili movie "Mithila Makhaan" won national film award in the category of "Best Maithili Films". In recent years, author and filmmaker Kislay Krishna wrote a book on the history of Maithili cinema with title Maithili Cinemak Itihaas. The book was selected as the best book on regional cinema by the jury of the 4th Sincine Film Festival 2023 held in Mumbai. The author Kislay Krishna was awarded by the Sincine Film Festival Award for his literary work on the history of Maithili cinema.

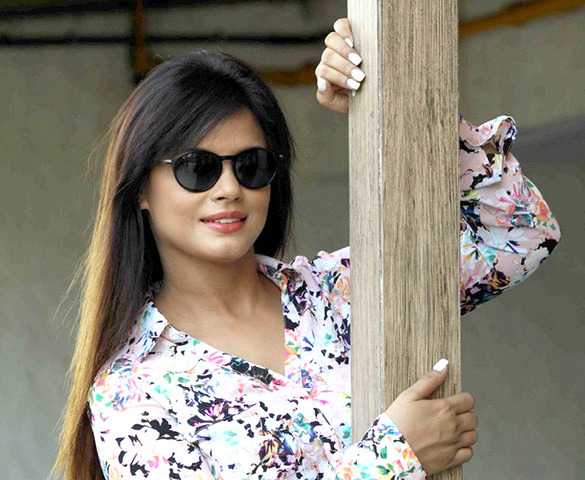
Maithili film producer Neetu Chandra poses post the National Award win for Mithila Makhaan in the category of Best Maithili Film (Credit for Image - Bollywood Hungama)

== History ==
The journey of Maithili cinema can be traced since 1965. The first Maithili film was Kanyadan which was produced in the year 1965 but released in the year 1971. The movie was based on the novel Kanyadan (English translation - The Bride) written in the Maithili language by the author Harimohan Jha in 1930. It was directed by Phani Majumdar. The second Maithili film was Mamta Gabe Geet. Its shooting started from the year 1962-1963 and continued parallel with the movie Kanyadan but due to some ups and downs in the production of the movie, it was released in the year 1982. During the shooting period its name was Naehar Bhel Mor Saasur. The movie was produced by the litterateur Kedar Nath Chaudhary and directed by Shree C Parmanand. The movie Mamta Gabe Geet is also considered as the first complete Maithili film because in the movie Kanyadan there was mixture of some Hindi language dialogues too but the movie Mamta Gabe Geet was made completely in Maithili language. The third Maithili film was Sasta Jinagi Mahag Sinoor. It was a superhit movie and became very popular among the Maithil audiences. It was released in the year 1999. In 2004, a movie named Garibak Beti was released. In the same year another movie Senurak Laaj was also released. Similarly in the year 2005, a Maithili movie with title Kakhan Harab Dukh Mor was released on the screens of some cinema theatres in the Mithila region. It was a superhit Maithili film and became popular among the audiences in the region. It was directed by Santosh Badal. It was based on the popular story of the Maithili poet Vidyapati and Ugna Mahadev. According to the statistics, this Maithili movie did a business of 39 crores and more than 1 crore DVDs have been sold till 2024.

Hindustan Times newspaper ( 25 February 2015) article about the news of the release of Maithili movie Lalka Paag on screens of theatres in Bihar on 27 February 2015.

== Recent developments ==
In 2016, the Bollywood actress Neetu Chandra and her director brother Nitin Chandra took an initiative to revive the Maithili film industry with the production of the Maithili movie Mithila Makhan. It was first movie in the history of Maithili cinema to win National Film Award. It was promoted by the famous Bollywood stars Hrithik Roshan, Nawazuddin Siddiqui, Manoj Vajpayee, Vidya Balan, Sonu Sood and Jackie Shroff. On 2 November 2018, author and director Rupak Sharar released a Maithili movie Premak Basat on screens of different cinema theatres in the Mithila region. It was also released in Dubai, Qatar and Kuwait. It was a superhit Maithili film. It is said that the movie was the most expensive movie in the history of Maithili cinema. The budget of the movie was of 1 crore Indian rupees. The movie was produced in Mumbai. In the movie, international standard sound and visual technology were used. The songs of the movie became popular among audiences.

Similarly the Maithili movie Jackson Halt was another superhit movie produced by Neetu Chandra in the year 2023 which was screened at the 55th edition of the International Film Festival of India (IFFI) 2024 held in Goa. It was a crime thriller movie in Maithili language. The Maithili film producer Neetu Chandra established her production house Champaran Talkies as well as created her own OTT platform Bejod to release regional Maithili movies.

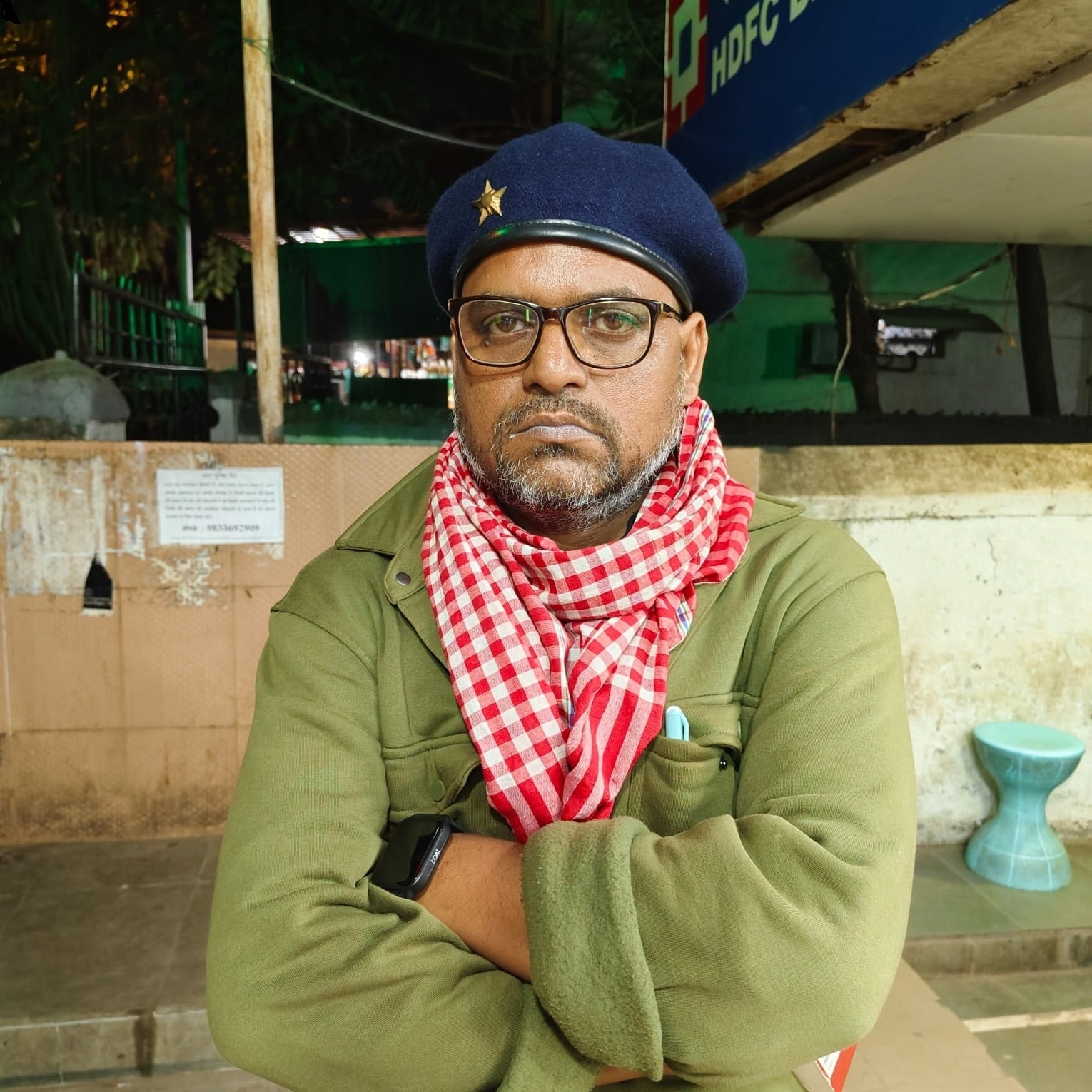
Image of the actor Durgesh Kumar in the Maithili movie Jackson Halt.

The Maithili film director Santosh Badal after the success of movie Kakhan Harab Dukh Mor, released another Maithili movie Raja Salhesh on the screens of theatres in the Mithila region in the year 2024. The movie was a superhit Maithili film of that year. A large numbers of audiences flocked to watch the movie in cinema theatres of the region. Apart from the Mithila region, the movie was also released on the screens of some multiplexes in the metropolitan cities of Mumbai and Delhi.

In the year 2024, the first two-days Maithili International Film Festival was organised on 25–26 June at the Girija Hall in Janakpur city of the Mithila region in Nepal. It was held to promote the development of the Maithili film industry, Maithili language, literature and its culture. It was jointly organised by the Janakpurdham Sub-Metropolitan City and the Lok Sanchar Janakpurdham. It was inaugurated by the chief minister Satish Kumar Singh of Madhesh Pradesh in Nepal.

== Awards ==
Maithili cinema has received increasing recognition at the National Film Awards. As of 2026, four Maithili films have won National Film Awards across the feature and non-feature film categories.

Film	Year	Category	Award
Dui Paatan Ke Beech Mein	2000	Non-Feature	Best Non-Feature Film
Naina Jogin	2007	Non-Feature	Best Arts / Cultural Film
Mithila Makhaan	2016	Feature	Best Feature Film in Maithili
Samanantar	2023	Feature	Best Feature Film in Maithili

== International recognition and contemporary cinema ==
Since the late 2010s, Maithili cinema has gained recognition at international film festivals through independent and realist productions. Unlike mainstream commercial regional cinema, many contemporary Maithili films focus on migration, unemployment, family relationships and social change in the Mithila region.

Achal Mishra's film Gamak Ghar (2019) premiered at the Mumbai Film Festival (MAMI), where it won the inaugural Manish Acharya Award for New Voices in Indian Cinema, and was later screened at several international film festivals.

Mishra's subsequent Maithili-language film Dhuin (2022) was screened at the 75th Cannes Film Festival and was later shown at the Museum of Modern Art (MoMA) in New York, the Dharamshala International Film Festival and other international venues.

Other contemporary Maithili films include Prateek Sharma's Lotus Blooms, which received critical appreciation for its realistic portrayal of migration, motherhood and rural life in Mithila. The film was selected for the Indian Panorama section at the 53rd International Film Festival of India (IFFI) in 2022. Samanantar won the 69th National Film Award for Best Maithili Film, reflecting the growing national recognition and diversity of themes within contemporary Maithili cinema.

== Major challenges ==
One of the major challenges for the Maithili cinema is the lack of proper platforms to release the Maithili movies. Maithili movies are not getting distributors, theater screens, multiplex cinema screens and even online OTT platforms. The other major challenge is lack of active audiences to watch the Maithili movies even having the population of Maithils people around 7 - 8 crores. According to the famous Maithili filmmaker Nitin Chandra, the Maithili cinema is still struggling to get some time on television or theatrical release.
