= Bhaiyaa =

1961 film

Bhaiyaa is the first film with sound in the cinema of Bihar which was a Magahi language film released in 1961 directed by Phani Majumdar.

== Synopsis ==
Parmanand lives a poor lifestyle in a village along with his widowed stepmother, Maya, and her two children, a son, Murli, who is studying in a Bombay college, and daughter, Kamla. Parmanand is in love with beautiful Bindu and hopes to marry her someday. When Murli returns home after obtaining a degree in arts, Parmanand notices that he loves Bindu, so he steps aside and permits him to marry her much to Maya's displeasure. Shortly after the marriage, Parmanand finds out that Murli has been spending a lot of time with Chandra, the daughter of Hariram Prasad. When he counsels Murli, he gets abused, and beats Murli up. Upset at this treatment, Murli and Bindu move out. Shortly thereafter Bindu gets pregnant much to Chandra's displeasure. Chandra confronts Bindu in a bid to make her hate her child and force her to abort while Murli files a claim in Court contesting his late father's Will as a forgery. Watch what impact this has on the rest of the family.

== Cast ==
- Tarun Bose as Parmanand
- Vijaya Choudhury as Bindu
- Helen as Dancer / Singer at Murli's son's birthday
- Padma Khanna as Chandra Hariram Prasad
- Shubha Khote as Pretty village girl
- Achala Sachdev as Maya
- Ramayan Tiwari as Gulati
- Gopal as Murli
- Lata Sinha as Kamla
- Bhagwan Sinha

== See also ==
- Cinema of Bihar
