= Bapi–Tutul =

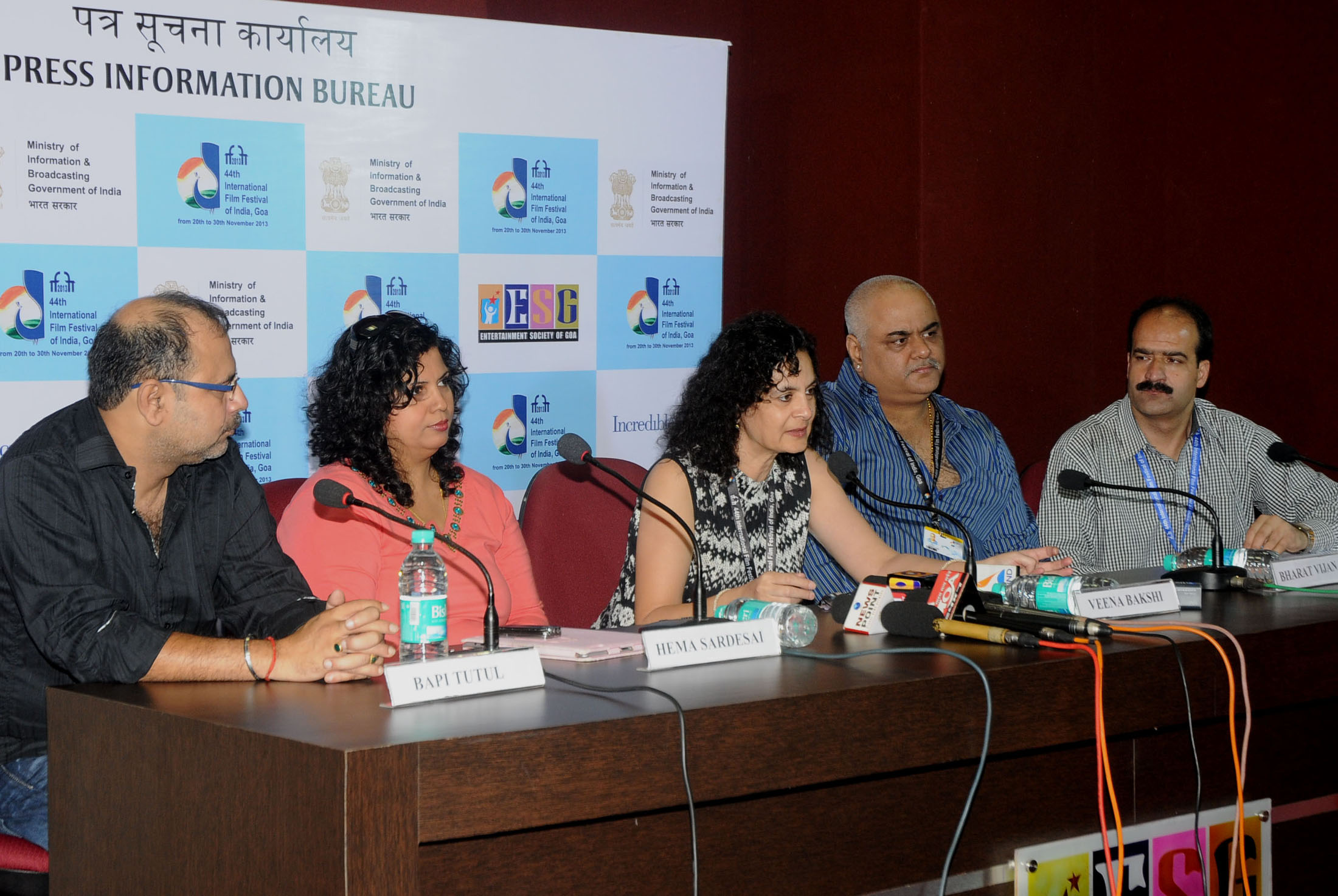
- Bapi (left) at IFFI 2013

Background information
- Also known as: Bapi Tutul
- Born: Bapi Tutul; Muzaffarpur, Bihar
- Occupations: singer-songwriter, film composer

Bapi Tutul are a Hindi film singer-songwriter duo consisting of Bapi and his younger brother Tutul.

== Film career ==
It was only after meeting Bollywood actress Manisha Koirala and Filmmaker Ram Gopal Varma that they got their first break as Music Composers in RGV's 2003 release Bhoot and Ek Hasina Thi. And from then on, they have worked on several movies like Paisa Vasool, Chal Pichchur Banate Hain, Khosla Ka Ghosla, Sarkar and Sarkar Raj

== Discography ==
- Jackson Halt (2023)
- Pihu (2018)
- Bhor (2016)
- Main Khudiram Bose Hun (2016)
- The Coffin Maker (2014)
- Kathputli (Documentary) (2014)
- Daughters of Mother India (Documentary) (2014)
- Dhobi Ki Dulhan Pyari Hai (Post-Production) (2014)
- Chowky (2014)
- Chal Pichchur Banate Hain (2012)
- Bubblegum (2011)
- Rakta Charitra (2010)
- Stations (Short) (2009)
- Zor Lagaa Ke...Haiya! (2009)
- Agyaat (2009)
- Oh, My God (2009)
- Veer Yodha Prithviraj Chauhan (2008)
- Sarkar Raj (2008).
- Phoonk (2008)
- Antardwand (2008)
- Khosla Ka Ghosla (2006)
- James (2005)
- Paisa Vasool (2004)
- Ek Hasina Thi (2004)
- Bhoot (2003 )
- Companion of the Evenings (Film) (2026)

== Marathi movies ==
- Sangharsh (Upcoming) (2014)
- Zapatlela 2 (Background Music Score) (2013)
- Ved Lavi Jeeva – (music director)(2012)
- Dubhang – (music director)(2011)

== Awards and recognition ==
Bapi–Tutul were nominated in the Best Background Score Category for 15th Annual Star Screen Awards. This nomination was for 2008 release Phoonk. In 2011, they were awarded with MATA Sanman Awards. The Best Title Track award was given for their composition in Marathi TV Series – Anorakhi Disha. Recently, they won Golden Pegasus at 4th Peloponnesian International Film Festival for The Coffin Maker.

== See also ==
- List of composers
