= Babul Mora Naihar Chhooto Hi Jaaye =

"Babul Mora Naihar Chhooto Jaye"

Song
- A-side: "t"
- Recorded: qq
- Genre: Hindustani
- Length: 10:23
- Songwriter: Nawab Wajid Ali Shah

Babul Mora Naihar Chhooto Jaye is a popular Hindustani classical music song (thumri) in Raag Bhairavi, written by Nawab Wajid Ali Shah, the 19th-century Nawab of Awadh.

== History ==
The song was written by Nawab Wajid Ali Shah, the 19th-century Nawab of Awadh, as a lament when he was exiled from his beloved Lucknow by the British Raj before the failed Rebellion of 1857. He uses the bidaai (bride's farewell) of a bride from her father's (babul) home as a metaphor for his own banishment from his beloved Lucknow to far away Calcutta, where he spent the rest of his years.

It was also popularised by the classical vocalist, Pandit Bhimsen Joshi.

== Bollywood version ==
The most remembered version of the song is by actor-singer Kundan Lal Saigal for the Hindi movie Street Singer (1938) directed by Phani Majumdar, live on camera, under the music direction of Rai Chand Boral, just as playback singing was becoming popular. Jagjit and Chitra Singh also sang a version of the song in film Avishkaar (1973), set to music by Kanu Roy. Recently Arijit Singh has also sung a version of the song in a 2017 movie Poorna: Courage Has No Limit.

== Text and translation ==
बाबुल मोरा, नैहर छूटो ही जाए बाबुल मोरा, नैहर छूटो ही जाए

चार कहार मिल, मोरी डोलिया सजावें (उठायें) मोरा अपना बेगाना छूटो जाए | बाबुल मोरा ...

आँगना तो पर्बत भयो और देहरी भयी बिदेश जाए बाबुल घर आपनो मैं चली पीया के देश | बाबुल मोरा ...

Translation:

بابُل مورا، نیہر چھُوٹو ہی جائے بابُل مورا، نیہر چھُوٹو ہی جائے

(چار کہار مِل، موری ڈولِیا سجاویں (اُٹھایّں مورا اَپنا بیگانا چھُوٹو جائے ، بابُل مورا۔۔۔

آںگنا تو پربت بھیو اؤر دیہری بھیی بِدیش جائے بابُل گھر آپنو میں چلی پیّا کے دیش ، بابُل مورا ۔۔۔

O My father! I'm leaving home.
O My father! I'm leaving home.

The four (palanquin) bearers lift my palanquin.
I'm leaving those who were my own.

Your courtyard is now like a mountain, and the threshold, a foreign country.
I leave your house, father, I am going to my beloved's country.
