= Khamoshi =

Khamoshi (transl. Silence) may refer to:

- Khamoshi (1970 film), an Indian romantic drama film by Asit Sen, starring Waheeda Rehman and Rajesh Khanna
- Khamoshi: The Musical, a 1996 Indian romance film by Sanjay Leela Bhansali, starring Manisha Koirala and Salman Khan
- Khamoshi (2019 film), an Indian horror film by Chakri Toleti, starring Tamannaah Bhatia and Prabhu Deva
- Khamoshi (TV series), a 2017 Pakistani TV series

== See also ==
- Khamosh Nigahen (disambiguation)
- Khamosh, 1985 Indian thriller film by Vidhu Vinod Chopra
- Khamoshiyan, 2015 Indian horror film by Karan Darra
