= Kanu Roy =

Indian actor (1912–1981)

- Born: 9 December 1912
- Died: 20 December 1981 (aged 69); Calcutta, West Bengal, India
- Occupation: music director
- Years active: 1943–1983

Kanu Roy (1912 – 1981) was an Indian actor and music composer in Hindi and Bengali films. He gave music for most of Basu Bhattacharya's films.

His most famous compositions are for Geeta Dutt, such as Aaj ki kaali ghata in Uski Kahani (1966), Lyrics: Kaifi Azmi, and the songs of Geeta Dutt's last film as a singer, Anubhav (1971) – "Koi Chupke Se Aake", "Mera Dil Jo Mera Hota" and "Meri Jaan Mujhe Jaan Na Kaho". He also gave two hits to Manna Dey in Anubhav – "Phir Koi Phool Khila" and in Avishkaar – "Hansne Ki Chaah Ne Kitna Mujhe Rulaya Hai" and "Machal Ke Jab Bhi Aankhon Mein" by Bhupinder Singh in Griha Pravesh (1979). In his early struggling years in Mumbai, he did small film roles, and gave film music whenever he got a chance.

The Jagjit and Chitra Singh rendition of "Babul Mora Naihar Chhooto Jaye" in Avishkaar (1973) is also fairly well known. His other films were not so successful, however.

== Filmography ==
- Kismet (1943) – Actor
- Safar (1946) – Actor
- Mahal (1949) – Actor
- Jagriti (1954) – Actor
- Munimji (1955) – Actor
- Ham Sab Chor Hain (1956) – Actor
- Tumsa Nahin Dekha (1957) – Actor
- Pyar KI Rahen (1959)
- Naughty Boy (1962) – Actor
- Bandini (1963) – Actor
- Uski Kahani (1966) – Music
- Anubhav (1971) – Music
- Avishkaar (1973) – Music
- Tumhara Kalloo (1975) – Music
- Griha Pravesh (1979) – Music
- Sparsh (1980) – Music
- Shyamla (1980) – Music
- Kissi Se Na Kehna (1983) – Actor
