= Nando Bhattacharya =

Indian cinematographer

- Occupation: Cinematographer

Nando Bhattacharya, also sometimes spelled Nandu Bhattacharya, was an Indian cinematographer and director of Indian cinema whose career spanned from 1969 to 2005. For his work on Anubhav (1971), he won the National Film Award for Best Cinematography (Black and White) at the 19th National Film Awards.

== Filmography ==
As cinematographer or director of photography
Year	Film	Director	Ref
1969	Aradhana	Shakti Samanta	
1971	Anubhav	Basu Bhattacharya	
1974	Avishkaar	Basu Bhattacharya	
1974	Badhti Ka Naam Dadhi	Kishore Kumar	
1976	Balika Badhu	Tarun Majumdar	
1978	Aankhen Dehki	Rajinder Singh Bedi	
1978	Ghar	Manik Chatterjee	
1978	Devata	S. Ramanathan	
1981	Shakka	Kailash Chopra	
1982	Aamne Samne	Ashim Samanta	
1982	Chalti Ka Naam Zindagi	Kishore Kumar	
1985	Aar Paar	Shakti Samanta	
1985	Lover Boy	Shomu Mukherjee	
1986	Khamosh Nigahen	Ajay Sharma	
1990	Rajnartaki	Narayan Chakraborty	
1992	Ghazab Tamasha	Ranjeet	
1992	Jhoothi Shaan	Ranjan Bose	
1994	Ajana Path	Srinibas Chakraborty	
1996	Lathi	Prabhat Roy	
1977	Chakkar Pe Chakkar	Ashok Roy	
1998	Ami Je Tomari	Milan Bhowmick	
2004	Annaye Atyachar	Swapan Saha	
2005	Diragaman	Nando Bhattacharya	
