= Jackson Halt =

2023 Indian Maithili-language film

- Directed by: Nitin Chandra
- Starring: Abhishek Nishchal; Rambahadur Renu; Durgesh Kumar
- Cinematography: Vikash Sinha
- Music by: Bapi Bhattacharya
- Production company: Champaran Talkies
- Release date: 5 May 2023
- Country: India
- Language: Maithili

Jackson Halt is an Indian movie of the Maithili cinema released in 2023. It is a Maithili language crime thriller movie directed by Nitin Chandra. It was produced under the banner of Nitu Chandra's Champaran Talkies. The stars in the movie are Abhishek Nishchal, Rambahadur Renu and Durgesh Kumar in lead roles. The movie released on 5 May 2023 on Champaran Talkies homegrown OTT Bejod.

== Cast ==
- Nischal Abhishek as Rishi
- Ram Bahadur Renu as Station Master
- Durgesh Kumar as Gangman
