= Baabul (2006 film) =

2006 Indian film by Ravi Chopra

- Theatrical release poster
- Directed by: Ravi Chopra
- Written by: Achala Nagar
- Story by: Ravi Chopra
- Produced by: B. R. Chopra
- Starring: Amitabh Bachchan; Hema Malini; Salman Khan; Rani Mukerji; John Abraham; Om Puri
- Cinematography: Barun Mukherjee
- Edited by: Godfrey Gonsalves
- Music by: Aadesh Shrivastava
- Production company: B. R. Films
- Release date: 8 December 2006
- Running time: 169 minutes
- Country: India
- Language: Hindi
- Budget: ₹26 crore
- Box office: ₹39 crore

Baabul (transl. Father's affection to daughter) is a 2006 Indian Hindi-language drama film directed by Ravi Chopra and produced by B. R. Chopra. The film stars Amitabh Bachchan, Hema Malini, Salman Khan, Rani Mukerji, and John Abraham. It focuses on a father's efforts to rebuild his widowed daughter-in-law's life by encouraging her to find love again.

Principal photography took place across Mumbai and London. The film's music was composed by Aadesh Shrivastava, with lyrics written by Sameer.

Baabul was released theatrically on 8 December 2006, and received mixed reviews from critics. Despite its high-profile ensemble cast, the film underperformed at the box-office, grossing approximately ₹27.75 crore (US$6.2 million).

== Plot ==
Balraj Kapoor, a wealthy and respected businessman, lives a content life with his wife, Shobhna, while eagerly awaiting the return of their only son, Avinash, from the United States after completing his studies. Upon his return, Avinash joins the family business and soon falls in love with Malvika, affectionately called Millie, an independent and spirited artist. Although her childhood friend Rajat harbors unspoken feelings for her, he gracefully steps aside when Millie confesses her love for Avinash.

Avinash and Millie marry and are soon blessed with a son, Ansh. The family lives in bliss until tragedy strikes: on Ansh's birthday, while returning from a business trip in London, Avinash dies in a road accident. The loss devastates Millie and shatters the family's peace.

Determined to restore joy in Millie's life, Balraj reaches out to Rajat, who now lives in London, and proposes the idea of marriage between him and Millie. Rajat returns to India and gradually develops a bond with Ansh, rekindling his affection for Millie. However, Balraj's progressive vision faces resistance from Shobhna, who fears losing her grandson, and Balraj's conservative elder brother, Balwant, who deems widow remarriage unacceptable.

Despite familial opposition, Balraj remains steadfast. He persuades the family to embrace change and prioritizes Millie's happiness and future. Eventually, Rajat and Millie marry with the family's blessings. Towards the end, Avinash's spirit appears, offering his father gratitude and blessing the new union.

== Cast ==
- Amitabh Bachchan as Balraj Kapoor
- Salman Khan as Avinash Avi Kapoor, Balraj and Shobhna's son
- Hema Malini as Shobhna Kapoor, Balraj wife and Avinash's mother
- Rani Mukerji as Malvika Milli Kapoor, Avinash's widow
- John Abraham as Rajat Verma, Milli's childhood friend
- Om Puri as Balwant Kapoor, Balraj's elder brother
- Sarika as Pushpa Kapoor, Balraj and Balwant's widowed sister
- Parmeet Sethi as Khushi, Balwant's son
- Aman Verma as Shobhna's brother
- Rajpal Yadav as Paanchi
- Sharat Saxena as Jeet Talwar, Milli's father
- Smita Jaykar as Suman Talwar, Milli's mother
- Beena Banerjee as Balwant's wife
- Avtaar Gill as Avinash's advocate
- Master Dhairya as Ansh Kapoor, Avinash and Milli's son
- Vijay Patkar as Peon
- Shriya Saran as a bride in the opening credits (uncredited cameo appearance)

== Soundtrack ==
Baabul

Soundtrack album by Aadesh Shrivastava
- Released: 4 November 2006
- Genre: Feature film soundtrack
- Label: T-Series

The film's soundtrack was composed by Aadesh Shrivastava, with lyrics written by Sameer. It features a total of eleven tracks. The song "Baabul Bidaai Hai" sung by Richa Sharma was the longest track in a Hindi film with a length of 15 minutes (a 2-3 trimmed version was used in the film).

All lyrics are written by Sameer.

No.	Title	Singer(s)	Length
1.	"Gaa Re Maan"	Kavita Krishnamurthy, Alka Yagnik, Sudesh Bhosle, Kailash Kher	5:54
2.	"Come On Come On"	Amitabh Bachchan, Sonu Nigam, Vishal Dadlani, Aadesh Shrivastava, Ranjit Barot	4:37
3.	"Har Manzar"	Kunal Ganjawala	4:38
4.	"Baawri Piya Ki"	Sonu Nigam	7:25
5.	"Berbasi Dard Ke Alam"	Kunal Ganjawala	5:15
6.	"Keh Raha Hai Dil Deewana"	Sonu Nigam, Shreya Ghoshal	5:19
7.	"Kehta Hai Baabul" (Film version sung by Amitabh Bachchan)	Jagjit Singh	2:47
8.	"Baabul Bidaai"	Richa Sharma	2:07
9.	"Vaada Raha Hai"	Sonu Nigam	3:10

== Reception ==
=== Box office ===
Baabul opened to approximately 75% occupancy in Mumbai, a figure considered low for a Salman Khan-led film, and collections declined rapidly due to negative word-of-mouth. In other regions of India, the film opened poorly and failed to gain momentum, ultimately being declared a commercial failure in the domestic market. While performance in smaller centers remained weak, it was categorized as an above-average grosser overall in India. Internationally, the film fared significantly better, debuting at the eighth position on the UK box office chart in its first week and performing strongly in overseas markets.

=== Critical response ===
The film received mixed reviews from critics. The Times Of India rated it 3 out of 5 stars, noting that the "first half [was] completely dead and totally listless." Samrat Sharma of Full Hyderabad described it as "a film made for the more traditional generation or social class," adding that while it may not be highly effective, it remained "sufficiently well-crafted." Namrata Joshi of Outlook India awarded it two out of four stars, writing, "Despite the failings in his character, Big B Amitabh Bachchan lends it gravitas and dignity," though she criticized his "self-conscious cute couple act with Hema Malini" as tiresome, suggesting "it's time to get over Baghban (2003)."

== Accolades ==
Award	Date of the ceremony	Category	Recipients	Result	Ref.
Screen Awards	6 January 2007	Jodi No. 1	Rani Mukerji and Salman Khan	Nominated	
Filmfare Awards	17 February 2007	Best Supporting Actor	John Abraham	Nominated	
Bollywood Movie Awards	26 May 2007	Best Supporting Actor	John Abraham	Nominated	

== See also ==
- Babul (Hindi word)
