= Avishkaar =

- Lobby card
- Directed by: Basu Bhattacharya
- Written by: Gyandev Agnihotri; Basu Bhattacharya
- Produced by: Basu Bhattacharya
- Starring: Rajesh Khanna; Sharmila Tagore
- Cinematography: Nando Bhattacharya
- Edited by: S. Chakravarty
- Music by: Kanu Roy
- Distributed by: Aarohi Film Maker; Shermaroo Video Pvt. Ltd.
- Release date: 26 September 1974
- Running time: 108 mins
- Country: India
- Language: Hindi

Avishkaar (English: Invention) is a 1974 Indian Hindi-language film. Produced and directed by Basu Bhattacharya, the film stars Rajesh Khanna and Sharmila Tagore. The film was the part of Basu Battacharya's introspective trilogy on marital discord in an urban setting, which included Anubhav (1971) and Griha Pravesh (1979). Khanna had waived 70% of his remuneration to star in this project. The film was a success at box office.

It has been critically acclaimed, with Khanna receiving the Filmfare Award for Best Actor. The Bollywood guide Collections gave it five out of five stars. The Hindu reviewed "Here you can see Khanna inhabiting a disillusioned husband with all the details. There is nothing trademark 'Kaka' here as you only see Amar with all his frailties come alive on the screen. It must have being challenging for the raging star to pick a role where he was not the hero in the conventional sense." Scroll.in states, "Tagore’s eyes, at first glazed with wonder and trust, widen with bewilderment and then anger as she grapples with frustrations fathoms deep. In a seminal scene in which she asks for Amar to explain what it is that he really wants of her, she is simply outstanding. Meanwhile Khanna is the show stealer here. Through a fog of cigarette smoke, Amar's fixed gaze communicates the dullness of fatigue after the shattering of his inner world. When he speaks, his voice is low, and in two confrontational flashbacks with his hostile father-in-law, Khanna's performance peaks. The superstar's superb performance in Basu Bhattacharya's domestic drama proves his unexplored talent at stasis."

Avishkaar is also featured in Avijit Ghosh's book, 40 Retakes: Bollywood Classics You May Have Missed.

== Cast ==
- Rajesh Khanna ...as Amar
- Sharmila Tagore ...as Mansi
- Dina Pathak ...as taxi driver's wife
- Dennis Clement ... Dennis Clement
- Monika Jashnani ... Child artist
- Devendra Khandelwal...as Sunil
- Mahesh Sharma
- Minna Johar ... as Rita
- Satyen Kappu ...as Taxi driver

== Synopsis ==
Amar and Mansi are in love, and decide to get married. They do so, and still continue to be in love. They get to their first wedding anniversary, and decide to hire a taxi-cab for a day, just to drive around and have fun. Thereafter, to their joy they are blessed with a child. But then their bliss is cut short, when Amar starts work with his advertising agency, which grooms beautiful young women, to further their careers as models, and both cannot stand each other anymore.

== Plot ==
Amar (Rajesh Khanna) works in an ad agency. One night, when he is alone in his office, Rita one of the staff walks in and invites him to join her for a movie. Back home, Mansi (Sharmila Tagore) is at home with her child and Margarette, the maid. Sunil, Amar's childhood friend comes home with flowers and wishes her a happy anniversary. It's Amar's and Mansi's wedding anniversary and they don't remember it themselves.

They often looked back on their carefree early days, a time when they were deeply in love and nothing seemed impossible. Their marriage began beautifully, creating a small, joyful world that was entirely their own. Even a year later, that happiness endured. By their second anniversary, they felt ready to expand their circle and began planning for a child.

Amar starts finding fault in everything that Mansi does even suspecting that there's something going on between Mansi and Sunil. Mansi also knows about Rita. Amar wishes Mansi was as understanding as Rita. But though there are problems they sort them out.

Mansi gets up the following morning when the milkman comes. And when she goes out she sees the flowers that Amar had left outside the previous night. Amar comes from behind and sees her pick them up, he hugs her and they walk in together.

== Soundtrack ==
All songs were composed by Kanu Roy, while lyrics were penned by Kapil Kumar & Gyandev Agnihotri.

| Song | Singer |
|---|---|
| "Mere Lal Tum To Hamesha" | Manna Dey |
| "Hansne Ki Chah Ne Kitna" | Manna Dey |
| "Naina Hai Pyase Mere" | Asha Bhosle |
| "Babul Mora Naihar Chhooto Hi Jaaye" | Jagjit Singh, Chitra Singh |

== Awards ==
- Filmfare Best Actor Award: Rajesh Khanna
