= Anubhav (1971 film) =

- Poster
- Directed by: Basu Bhattacharya
- Screenplay by: Basu Bhattacharya
- Produced by: Basu Bhattacharya
- Starring: Sanjeev Kumar; Tanuja; Dinesh Thakur; A. K. Hangal
- Cinematography: Nando Bhattacharya
- Edited by: S. Chakravarty
- Music by: Kanu Roy
- Release date: 12 November 1971
- Running time: 139 minutes
- Country: India
- Language: Hindi

Anubhav (transl. Experience) is a 1971 Hindi-language film by noted director Basu Bhattacharya, which stars Sanjeev Kumar, Tanuja and Dinesh Thakur. The film was the first part of Basu Battacharya's introspective trilogy on marital discord in an urban setting, which included Avishkaar (1973) and Griha Pravesh (1979); and went on to win the 1972 National Film Award for Second Best Feature Film and started a trend later picked up even by the mainstream cinema. The film is also remembered for playback singer Geeta Dutt's finest songs composed by music director Kanu Roy with lyrics from Gulzar, like "Meri Jaan Mujhe Jaan Na Kaho", "Koi Chupke Se Aake" and "Mera Dil Jo Mera Hota".

== Plot ==
Amar Sen and Meeta Sen have been married for several years. Due to Amar's hectic work schedule, the couple did not have children, as there was no time for intimacy. Meeta decides to take matters into her own hands, gets rid of the servants, save for Hari, and decides to run the household on her own. This gets the couple to be closer, and eventually they have sex. Later, Meeta's old flame Shashi Bhushan not only re-enters Meeta's life, but also gets employed in the same organization as Amar, throwing their marriage again in jeopardy. One day while at home, Amar and Shashi discuss their work and Amar says that he'll join the office from tomorrow because he's recovered now from his flu. While Shashi leaves, Amar sees him talking with his wife. The next day, he asks Meeta to call for Shashi in an intimidating and arrogant tone, after Shashi leaves, Amar confronts Meeta and she explains their past relationship to him. Amar leaves the house without saying anything and asks Shashi to resign, though Shashi already has written his resignation letter because he sees himself as a reason of upheaval in their lives. Knowing this, Amar says that "the past comes between us only when we aren't able to live the present completely". After reaching home, Amar tries to tell Meeta, but she circumlocutes in an amusing manner and says that she has understood and tells him that she has understood that he has understood and they embrace each other.

== Cast ==
- Sanjeev - Amar Sen
- Tanuja - Meeta Sen
- Dinesh - Shashi Bhushan
- A. K. Hangal - Hari
- Paresh Nanda
- O. P. Kohli - Dr. Kohli
- Subir Sen - Himself
- Rainer F. Brusten - Moshe Andre (Guest Appearance)
- Dhumketu - (Guest Appearance)
- Lalit - (Guest Appearance)
- Atul - (Guest Appearance)
- N. K. Mukherjee - (Guest Appearance)
- Kinkar Sinha - (Guest Appearance)
- Meena Sinha - (Guest Appearance)
- Subhash Chowdhari - (Guest Appearance)

== Soundtrack ==
The film is remembered for its memorable songs sung by Geeta Dutt, Manna Dey and Subir Sen as guest appearance with music by Kanu Roy and evocative lyrics by Gulzar, while one song Koi Chupke Se Aake was written by Kapil Kumar, who also co-wrote film's dialogues.

Song title	Singers	Raga
"Koi Chupke Se Aake"	Geeta Dutt	
"Mera Dil Jo Mera Hota"	Geeta Dutt	
"Mujhe Jaan Na Kaho, Meri Jaan"	Geeta Dutt	
"Phir Kahin Koi Phool Khila"	Manna Dey	Desh
"Sedin Dujone Dulechhinu Bone (Rabindra Sangeet)"	Subir Sen	

== Awards and nominations ==
- 1972 National Film Award for Second Best Feature Film
