= Kanyadan (film) =

- Directed by: Phani Majumdar
- Based on: Kanyadaan by Hari Mohan Jha
- Release date: 1965
- Country: India
- Language: Maithili

Kanyadan is a 1965 Indian Maithili-language film directed by Phani Majumdar. It was the first feature film in the Maithili language. This film was based on the novel Kanyadaan, written by Hari Mohan Jha. The dialogues for the film were written by Hindi writer Phanishwar Nath 'Renu'.

== See also ==
- Cinema of Bihar
- Maithili Cinema
