= Nilesh =

Nilesh (sometimes also spelled as Neelesh) is an Indian name based on one of two deities, Vishnu or Shiva, in Hinduism, depending on which of its two Hindi pronunciations are used. 'Nilesh' means 'the Blue God', and is one of the alternate names for Vishnu, "The Preserver." Later, the name was also used to refer to Shiva, "The Destroyer of Evil", "The King." The name is a combination (sandhi) of two words: Neel ("blue") and Ish ("Lord" or "God"). Ish or Esh is also a Sanskrit word for head. Hence, the name can also be interpreted as 'Blue Head,' which refers to Vishnu or Shiva.

Nilesh also refers to a third deity: Krishna. Krishna is also referred to as the Blue God because of the darker skin which is always displayed in pictures and statues in the colour blue.

Notable persons with this name include:

- Nilesh Cabral, Indian politician
- Nilesh Chaudhary (born 1983), Indian cricketer
- Nilesh Girkar, Indian scriptwriter
- Nilesh Gupta (born 1973/74), Indian businessman, managing director of Lupin Limited
- Nilesh Kulkarni (born 1973), Indian cricketer
- Nilesh Limaye (born 1972), Indian chef
- Nilesh Moharir, Indian music director
- Nilesh Narayan Rane (born 1981), Indian politician
- Nilesh Parmar (born 1987), Omani cricketer
- Nilesh Prabhudesai, Indian politician
- Nilesh Sable (born 1986), Indian television show host and actor
- Nilesh Sahay (born 1983), Indian actor
- Nilesh Samani (born 1956), British medical doctor
