= Phani Majumdar =

Indian film director

- Born: 28 December 1911; Faridpur, Bengal Presidency, British India
- Died: 16 May 1994 (aged 82); Mumbai, Maharashtra, India
- Occupations: film director, screenwriter
- Years active: 1938–1986

Phani Majumdar was a pioneering Indian film director, who worked in Bengali and Hindi cinema, most known for his film Street Singer (1938) starring K.L. Saigal noted for its song, Babul Mora Naihar Chhooto Jaye, Meena Kumari classic Aarti (1962) and Oonche Log (1965). He also worked in Singapore, where he notably made Hang Tuah (1955) in Malay, which was nominated for the Golden Bear at the 7th Berlin International Film Festival.

== Career ==
Starting in 1930s, with leading film director P.C. Barua at New Theatres Studio of Calcutta founded by B. N. Sircar, who during this period made classics like Devdas (1935). He moved to Bombay in 1941 and worked with Bombay Talkies studio, he made Tamanna (1942) with Suraiya and Mohabbat (1943) with Shanta Apte and Andolan (1951). He made films in Punjabi, Magahi (Bhaiya, 1961) and Maithili (Kanyadaan, 1965). His Oonch Log was actor Feroz Khan's first hit and won the National Film Award for Second Best Feature Film.

Noted film director-producer Shakti Samanta assisted Majumdar in Tamasha, Baadbaan and Dhobi Doctor at Bombay Talkies before working independently.

He was married to Monica Desai, sister of actress, Leela Desai.

== Filmography ==
| Year | Film | Director | Writer | Notes |
|---|---|---|---|---|
| 1938 | Street Singer | Yes | No | K.L. Saigal, Hindi |
| 1938 | Sathi | Yes | No | K. L. Saigal, Bengali version of Street Singer |
| 1943 | Mohabbat | Yes | No | |
| 1948 | Hum Bhi Insaan Hain | Yes | No | |
| 1952 | Tamasha | Yes | Yes (screenplay) | Dev Anand, Meena Kumari, Ashok Kumar, Kaushalya |
| 1952 | Goonj | Yes | No | Suraiya (Heroine), Suresh(Hero), Producer: H.S Kwatra, Story & Lyrics: D. N. Madhok, Sardul Kwatra |
| 1954 | Baadbaan | Yes | Yes (story) | |
| 1956 | Hang Tuah | Yes | No | Malay language |
| 1956 | Anak-ku Sazali | Yes | No | Malay language |
| 1957 | Kaseh Sayang | Yes | No | Malay language |
| 1958 | Doktor | Yes | Yes (story) | Malay language |
| 1958 | Sri Menanti | Yes | No | Malay language |
| 1961 | Bhaiyaa | Yes | Yes (story) | Magahi |
| 1962 | Aarti | Yes | No | Meena Kumari, Ashok Kumar |
| 1965 | Kanyadan | Yes | No | Maithili language |
| 1965 | Akashdeep | Yes | No | |
| 1965 | Kaajal | No | Yes | |
| 1965 | Oonche Log | Yes | Yes | National Film Award for Second Best Feature Film in Hindi; Feroz Khan's first hit |
| 1978 | Badalte Rishtey | No | Yes | |
| 1986 | Ek Chadar Maili Si | No | Yes | |

Note:Films in Hindi-language unless mentioned otherwise.

== Awards ==
National Film Awards

- 1961: All India Certificate of Merit for the Second Best Children's Film - Savitri
- 1965: Second Best Feature Film: Oonch Log
