= Raj Verma =

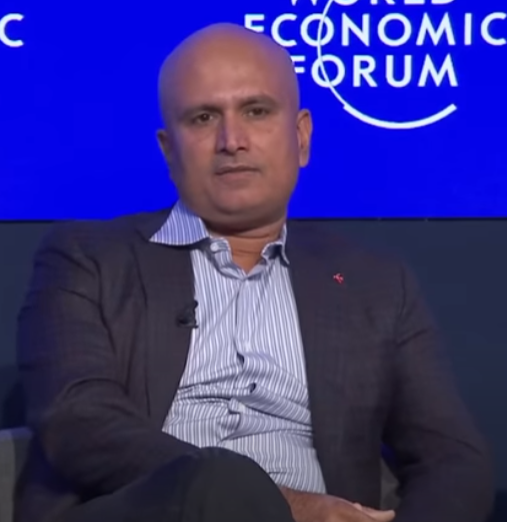
Image of Raj Verma

Raj Verma is the chief executive officer of SingleStore, a data technology company that allows users to transact, analyze, and search data in real time.

== Biography ==
He began his career at Wipro, an Indian tech giant. He started his career in computer sales at WIPRO before moving to Parametric Technology Corporation (PTC), a software company based in Massachusetts. At PTC, Verma became the top seller in India by 1997 and was promoted to Director of Sales Development for the Asia-Pacific (APAC) region, requiring a move to Hong Kong.

In 2001, Verma joined Staffware, a business process management (BPM) technology provider, to help expand its presence in the APAC region. Staffware was acquired by TIBCO in 2004. At TIBCO, he gained insights into real-time data processing, a concept championed by the company's founder, Vivek Ranadivé.

He joined TIBCO as sales director for Asia and in 2006 was later transferred to the company's Silicon Valley headquarters to drive sales of BPM software. He rose through the ranks, becoming chief marketing officer (CMO), Executive Vice President of Global Sales, and chief operating officer (COO). During his tenure, Verma helped in growing TIBCO's revenue to over $1 billion. He remained with the company until 2011, leaving shortly after Ranadivé stepped down as CEO.

After his time at TIBCO, Verma held executive roles at Apttus Software as chief revenue officer (CRO) and COO, and at Hortonworks as president and COO.

=== SingleStore ===
In 2019, he was approached by MemSQL, a software database company, to take on the role of CEO. In 2020, MemSQL, a startup with about 60 customers, was rebranded as SingleStore under Verma's leadership to highlight its key technology, the ability to transact and analyze data in a single database location (a single store).

Since becoming CEO of SingleStore, Verma led the company in growing its annual recurring revenue from $10 million in 2019 to over $100 million by 2023. The rise of generative AI boosted SingleStore's visibility due to its ability to provide real-time data for AI systems. The company also developed AI-related products like vector and text search capabilities and integration with Snowflake to enhance data retrieval.

In 2023, Raj Verma was named one of the Top 50 Business Leaders of San Francisco.

== Publications and media presence ==
Raj Verma is the author of Time is Now: A Journey into Demystifying AI, published in April 2024. The book aims to make AI accessible to a broader audience by combining insights from Verma's career with practical advice on using AI ethically.

He also hosts the podcast Into the Singleverse, where he discusses the impact of real-time data on various aspects of life with leaders from different fields, including business, academia, sports, and philanthropy. Podcast guests have included Nick Thompson, Pádraig Harrington, Vinod Khosla, Ashton Kutcher, and Van Jones.

Raj has been published on AI in outlets like Fast Company, and the World Economic Forum, and has been interviewed on major broadcasting outlets like Yahoo Finance (Julie Hyman), Bloomberg (Francine Lacqua), Nasdaq (Kristina Ayanian), and CNBC Asia (Tanvir Gill).
