= Patna Film Festival =

Indian film festival

Patna Film Festival is an international film festival in Patna, India. Participant countries include Iran, Canada, China, Japan, Sweden, Germany, Russia, the United States, and India. Patna Film Festival started in 2006. It was jointly organised by the Ministry of Information and Broadcasting, National Film Development Corporation (NFDC), directorate of the film festival, National Film Archive of India, Federation of Film Societies of India, and the state government.

== History ==
=== 2000s ===
The first Patna Film Festival was held the week of February 11, 2006, at Mona Cinema hall, Patna.

The second event was held in February 2007. The foreign segment of the festival had one movie each in French, German, Italian, Japanese, and Swedish languages.

The third festival was held the week of April 5, 2008, at Regent Theater. Participant countries were Japan, Sweden, Germany, Russia, the United States, and India. Taare Zameen Par was the inaugural film. Bhojpuri, Kannada, Marathi and Telugu language films were also part of the festival.

=== Patna Film Festival ===
Patna Film Festival (PFF) launched a pre-festival campaign on March 22, 2015. The campaign started in Patna with a screening of Children of War, based on the 1971 Bangladesh war.

Sri Lanka was granted a special guest status with a festival country (utsav desh) tag. Bihar and Sri Lanka share a common bond, especially because of Buddhism, which spread from Bihar to the island. Sri Lankans visit Bodh Gaya, the seat of Buddha's enlightenment. The festival logo included the Sri Lankan flag, says Raviraj Patel.

Guest film makers in PIFF : Vimukte Jay sundare from Sri Lanka, Dhanushka from Sri Lanka, Bijaya Jena, Sanjivan Lal, Karan Baali, Shubhadra Chaudhary, Sudhir Palsane, Dilip Patnayak, Joshi Joshef, Kapilash Bhuinyan and Susant Misra.

The festival was organized by Bihar state film development and finance corporation limited under the Art, Culture and Youth Department government of Bihar. Guest film personalities included Seema Kapoor, Lenin Rajendran, Uthara Unni, Pawan Malhotra, Sandeep Sawant, Paresh Mokashi, Nandu Madhav, Sabyasachi Mohapatra, Atal Bihari Panda, Susant Misra, Dilip Patnayak, Ramkumar Singh and Gajendra Sarotriya. The festival was coordinated and curated by Raviraj Patel, a youth filmmaker, and writer from Bihar.

== See also ==
- Cinema of Bihar
