= Durgesh Kumar =

Indian actor

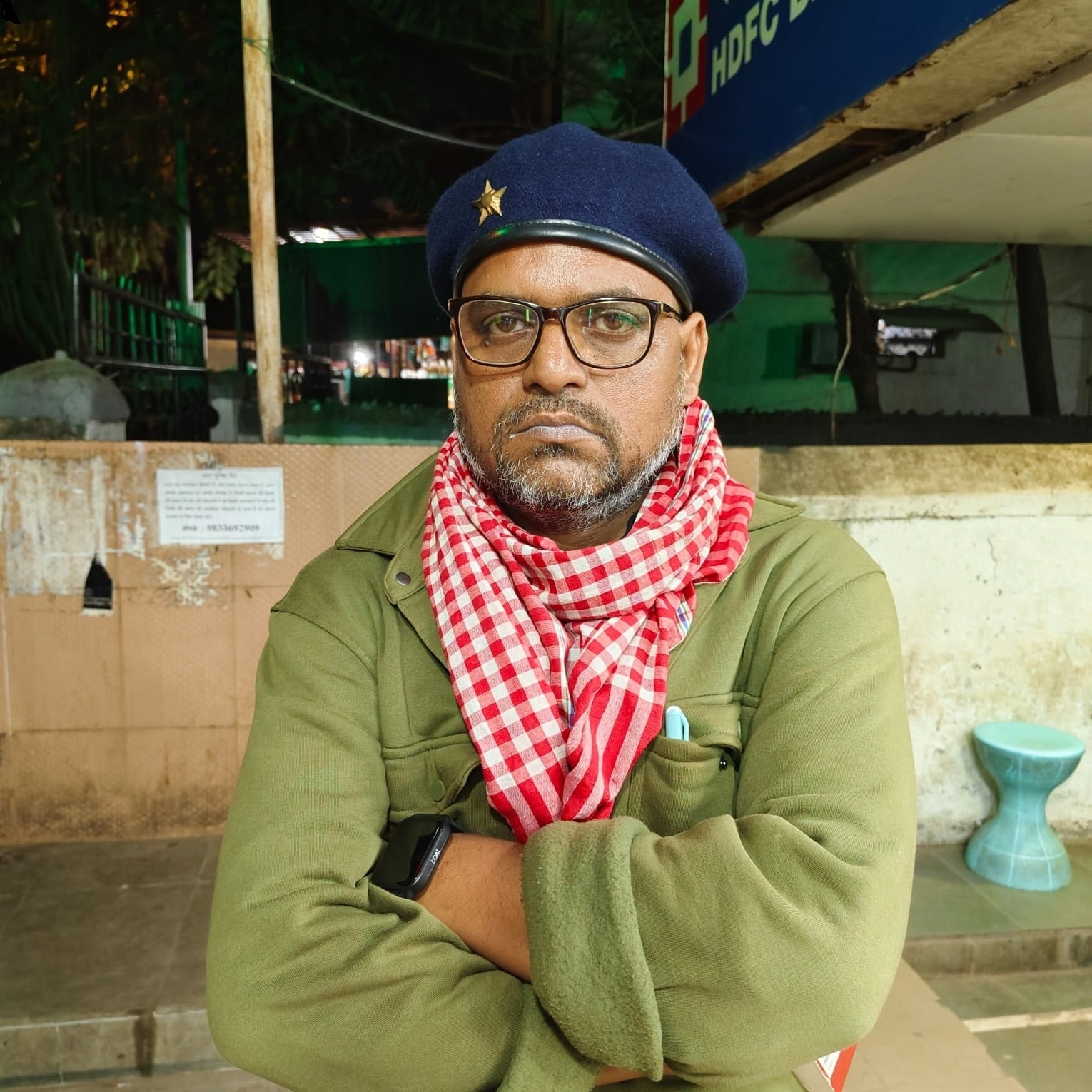
- Durgesh Kumar
- Born: 21 October 1984 (age 41); Motipur, Block Benipur, Darbhanga, Bihar
- Education: National School of Drama
- Occupation: Actor
- Known for: Bicchoo Ka Khel, Panchayat, Jackson Halt, Laapataa Ladies, Dedh Bigha Zameen, Nishaanchi

Durgesh Kumar is an Indian actor from Bihar. He has had roles in Hindi cinema and web series.

== Early life and education ==
Kumar pursued engineering upon arriving in Delhi in 2001. However, after facing challenges with entrance exam, he redirected his focus towards theatre. He participated in approximately 35 plays during this time. He concurrently pursued his bachelor of Art Honours degree from Ignou between 2004 and 2007, alongside completing a certificate course in acting at the Shri Ram Centre Performing Arts from 2004 to 2006.

Kumar was accepted into the National School of Drama (NSD), where he attained a postgraduate diploma in acting.

Durgesh Kumar disclosed to a member of the media that his family played a pivotal role as his greatest support during his days of struggle. It was his elder brother who suggested Durgesh pursue theatre after he faced setbacks in the engineering entrance test. Durgesh Kumar regards actor Nawazuddin Siddiqui as his primary source of inspiration in the acting industry.

== Career ==
He made his Bollywood debut with the role of Aadoo in the film Highway, followed by supporting roles in movies like Sultan, Freaky Ali, Sanju and Dhadak. His breakthrough came with his portrayal of Bhushan in the acclaimed web series Panchayat. Durgesh expressed surprise at the character's success, crediting the show's creators for crafting the role of Banrakas. He also starred in the 2023 film Laapataa Ladies.

== Filmography ==
Year	Movie	Role	References
2014	Highway	Aadoo	
2014	Shuruaat Ka Interval	Taxi Driver	
2016	Sultan	Commentator (uncredited)	
2016	Freaky Ali	Babu	
2017	The Suspect	Abdul Rahim Ansari	
2017	Behen Hogi Teri	Inspector	
2017	The Dream Job	Gopal	
2017	Love The First Sight	Durgesh	
2018	Rangamanch	Manju	
2018	Sanju	Postman	
2018	Dhadak	Bheema	
2018	Inner City	Lokesh	
2018	Bhaag Bawre Aandhi Aayi	Raghu	
2018	Janpath Kiss	Hawaldar	
2019	Bombairiya	Yadav	
2020	Bicchoo Ka Khel	Goli bhaiya	Web Series
2020–present	Panchayat	Bhushan aka Banrakas	Web Series
2020	A Simple Murder	Shankar	Web Series
2020	Bahut Hua Samman	Pradeep aka Pablo Yadav	
2023	Jackson Halt	Gangman	
2024	Laapataa Ladies	Dubey Ji	
2024	Bhakshak	Guptaji	
2024	Dedh Bigha Zameen	Avdhesh Gupta	
2025	Tumko Meri Kasam	Duryodhana Bajaj / Yashwant Bajaj double roles	
2025	The Networker	Lallan	
2025	Nishaanchi	Bank Security Guard	
2026	Pati Patni Aur Woh Do	Mahinder	
2026	Kartavya	Amar	
2026	The Vvaan: Force of the Forrest	Patrakaar	
