= Khamosh Nigahen (1986 film) =

- Directed by: Ajay Sharma
- Produced by: Ajay Sharma
- Starring: Rakesh Roshan; Deepti Naval
- Cinematography: Nando Bhattacharya
- Edited by: Sudhir Verma
- Music by: Ravi
- Production company: Ajay Films
- Release date: 6 April 1986
- Country: India
- Language: Hindi

Khamosh Nigahen is a 1986 Bollywood film. It stars Rakesh Roshan and Deepti Naval in lead roles.

== Music ==
Lyricist: Ravi

Song	Singer
"Dard-E-Dil Tune Diya"	Ravi
"Chalo Aaj Chalen"	Kishore Kumar
"Maine Tumse Muskurake Baat Ki, Yeh To Meri Adat Hai"	Kishore Kumar, Asha Bhosle
"Ab Tak Na Aaye Sanwariya"	Lata Mangeshkar
"So Ja Re So Ja Raja"	Asha Bhosle
"Khamosh Nigahen" – 1	Asha Bhosle
"Khamosh Nigahen" – 2	Asha Bhosle
"Khamosh Nigahen" – 3	Asha Bhosle
